= List of Greek Cup finals =

The Greek Cup final, commonly referred to in Greece as just the Cup final is the last match in the Greek Cup.

== List of finals ==
List of Greek Cup finals
Season	Winner	Score	Runner-up	Venue	Attendance
1931–32	AEK Athens	5–3	Aris	Leoforos Alexandras Stadium, Athens	10,000
1932–33	Ethnikos Piraeus	2–2	Aris	Aris Stadium, Thessaloniki	7,000
1932–33	Ethnikos Piraeus	2–1 (R)	Aris	Leoforos Alexandras Stadium, Athens	
1933–34	Not held				
1934–35	Not held				
1935–36	Not held				
1936–37	Not held				
1937–38	Not held				
1938–39	AEK Athens	2–1	PAOK	Leoforos Alexandras Stadium, Athens	
1939–40	Panathinaikos	3–1	Aris	Leoforos Alexandras Stadium, Athens	
1940–41	Abandoned after the first round				
1941–42	Not held due to World War II				
1942–43	Not held due to World War II				
1943–44	Not held due to World War II				
1944–45	Not held due to World War II				
1945–46	Not held due to World War II				
1946–47	Olympiacos	5–0	Iraklis	Leoforos Alexandras Stadium, Athens	12,000
1947–48	Panathinaikos	2–1	AEK Athens	Leoforos Alexandras Stadium, Athens	12,000
1948–49	AEK Athens	0–0	Panathinaikos	Leoforos Alexandras Stadium, Athens	15,000
1948–49	AEK Athens	2–1 (R)	Panathinaikos	Leoforos Alexandras Stadium, Athens	15,000
1949–50	AEK Athens	4–0	Aris	Leoforos Alexandras Stadium, Athens	5,500
1950–51	Olympiacos	4–0	PAOK	Leoforos Alexandras Stadium, Athens	15,000
1951–52	Olympiacos	2–2	Panionios	Leoforos Alexandras Stadium, Athens	15,000
1951–52	Olympiacos	2–0 (R)	Panionios	Leoforos Alexandras Stadium, Athens	15,000
1952–53	Olympiacos	3–2	AEK Athens	Leoforos Alexandras Stadium, Athens	25,000
1953–54	Olympiacos	2–0	Doxa Drama	Leoforos Alexandras Stadium, Athens	
1954–55	Panathinaikos	2–0	PAOK	Leoforos Alexandras Stadium, Athens	6,729
1955–56	AEK Athens	2–1	Olympiacos	Leoforos Alexandras Stadium, Athens	25,000
1956–57	Olympiacos	2–0	Iraklis	Karaiskakis Stadium, Piraeus	
1957–58	Olympiacos	5–1	Doxa Drama	Karaiskakis Stadium, Piraeus	22,000
1958–59	Olympiacos	2–1	Doxa Drama	Leoforos Alexandras Stadium, Athens	25,000
1959–60	Olympiacos	1–1	Panathinaikos	Leoforos Alexandras Stadium, Athens	25,000
1959–60	Olympiacos	3–0 (R)	Panathinaikos	Karaiskakis Stadium, Piraeus	
1960–61	Olympiacos	3–0	Panionios	Leoforos Alexandras Stadium, Athens	25,000
1961–62	Olympiacos–Panathinaikos (0–0) (Note: The match between Olympiacos and Panathinaikos was abandoned in the 97th minute with the score at 0–0 due to darkness. No replay was scheduled, so there was no Cup winner.)			Nikos Goumas Stadium, Athens	28,155
1962–63	Olympiacos	3–0	Pierikos	Leoforos Alexandras Stadium, Athens	25,000
1963–64	AEK Athens	(w/o) (Note: The final was scratched and AEK Athens were awarded the cup after the semi-final between Panathinaikos and Olympiacos was abandoned due to riots from the supporters of both clubs and both teams were ejected from the competition.)	—	—	—
1964–65	Olympiacos	1–0	Panathinaikos	Karaiskakis Stadium, Piraeus	45,000
1965–66	AEK Athens	2–0 (w/o) (Note: The final was scratched and AEK Athens were awarded the Cup, as Olympiacos were unable to show up for the final.)	Olympiacos	—	—
1966–67	Panathinaikos	1–0	Panionios	Nikos Goumas Stadium, Athens	28,000
1967–68	Olympiacos	1–0	Panathinaikos	Leoforos Alexandras Stadium, Athens	22,318
1968–69	Panathinaikos	1–1 (Note: Panathinaikos won the cup on the toss of a coin.)	Olympiacos	Karaiskakis Stadium, Piraeus	39,000
1969–70	Aris	1–0	PAOK	Kaftanzoglio Stadium, Thessaloniki	46,695
1970–71	Olympiacos	3–1	PAOK	Karaiskakis Stadium, Piraeus	38,000
1971–72	PAOK	2–1	Panathinaikos	Karaiskakis Stadium, Piraeus	34,831
1972–73	Olympiacos	1–0	PAOK	Karaiskakis Stadium, Piraeus	40,070
1973–74	PAOK	2–2 (Note: Score was 2–2 after extra time. PAOK won the penalty shoot-out 4–3.)	Olympiacos	Nikos Goumas Stadium, Athens	28,000
1974–75	Olympiacos	1–0	Panathinaikos	Karaiskakis Stadium, Piraeus	34,430
1975–76	Iraklis	4–4 (Note: Score was 4–4 after extra time. Iraklis won the penalty shoot-out 6–5.)	Olympiacos	Nikos Goumas Stadium, Athens	24,871
1976–77	Panathinaikos	2–1	PAOK	Karaiskakis Stadium, Piraeus	28,490
1977–78	AEK Athens	2–0	PAOK	Karaiskakis Stadium, Piraeus	23,483
1978–79	Panionios	3–1	AEK Athens	Karaiskakis Stadium, Piraeus	20,299
1979–80	Kastoria	5–2	Iraklis	Nikos Goumas Stadium, Athens	9,471
1980–81	Olympiacos	3–1	PAOK	Nikos Goumas Stadium, Athens	30,512
1981–82	Panathinaikos	1–0	AEL	Nikos Goumas Stadium, Athens	22,560
1982–83	AEK Athens	2–0	PAOK	Olympic Stadium, Athens	72,240
1983–84	Panathinaikos	2–0	AEL	Olympic Stadium, Athens	73,829
1984–85	AEL	4–1	PAOK	Olympic Stadium, Athens	24,994
1985–86	Panathinaikos	4–0	Olympiacos	Olympic Stadium, Athens	72,948
1986–87	OFI	1–1 (Note: Score was 1–1 after extra time. OFI won the penalty shoot-out 3–1.)	Iraklis	Olympic Stadium, Athens	23,587
1987–88	Panathinaikos	2–2 (Note: Score was 2–2 after extra time. Panathinaikos won the penalty shoot-out 4–3.)	Olympiacos	Olympic Stadium, Athens	73,375
1988–89	Panathinaikos	3–1	Panionios	Olympic Stadium, Athens	54,183
1989–90	Olympiacos	4–2	OFI	Olympic Stadium, Athens	47,627
1990–91	Panathinaikos	3–0	Athinaikos	Leoforos Alexandras Stadium, Athens	12,737
1990–91	Panathinaikos	2–1	Athinaikos	Olympic Stadium, Athens	19,375
1990–91	Panathinaikos won 5–1 on aggregate				
1991–92	Olympiacos	1–1	PAOK	Toumba Stadium, Thessaloniki	25,744
1991–92	Olympiacos	2–0	PAOK	Karaiskakis Stadium, Piraeus	29,831
1991–92	Olympiacos won 3–1 on aggregate				
1992–93	Panathinaikos	1–0	Olympiacos	Olympic Stadium, Athens	64,532
1993–94	Panathinaikos	3–3 (Note: Score was 3–3 after extra time. Panathinaikos won the penalty shoot-out 4–2.)	AEK Athens	Olympic Stadium, Athens	61,232
1994–95	Panathinaikos	1–0	AEK Athens	Olympic Stadium, Athens	60,777
1995–96	AEK Athens	7–1	Apollon Athens	Olympic Stadium, Athens	31,563
1996–97	AEK Athens	0–0 (Note: Score was 0–0 after extra time. AEK Athens won the penalty shoot-out 5–3.)	Panathinaikos	Karaiskakis Stadium, Piraeus	21,926
1997–98	Panionios	1–0	Panathinaikos	Karaiskakis Stadium, Piraeus	21,436
1998–99	Olympiacos	2–0	Panathinaikos	Olympic Stadium, Athens	57,783
1999–2000	AEK Athens	3–0	Ionikos	Olympic Stadium, Athens	25,471
2000–01	PAOK	4–2	Olympiacos	Nikos Goumas Stadium, Athens	13,300
2001–02	AEK Athens	2–1	Olympiacos	Olympic Stadium, Athens	45,258
2002–03	PAOK	1–0	Aris	Toumba Stadium, Thessaloniki	18,703
2003–04	Panathinaikos	3–1	Olympiacos	Nea Smyrni Stadium, Athens	7,500
2004–05	Olympiacos	3–0	Aris	Pampeloponnisiako Stadium, Patras	15,550
2005–06	Olympiacos	3–0	AEK Athens	Pankritio Stadium, Heraklion	22,079
2006–07	AEL	2–1	Panathinaikos	Panthessaliko Stadium, Volos	18,111
2007–08	Olympiacos	2–0	Aris	Kaftanzoglio Stadium, Thessaloniki	19,199
2008–09	Olympiacos	4–4 (Note: Score was 4–4 after extra time. Olympiacos won the penalty shoot-out 15–14.)	AEK Athens	Olympic Stadium, Athens	48,594
2009–10	Panathinaikos	1–0	Aris	Olympic Stadium, Athens	48,926
2010–11	AEK Athens	3–0	Atromitos	Olympic Stadium, Athens	50,912
2011–12	Olympiacos	2–1	Atromitos	Olympic Stadium, Athens	41,500
2012–13	Olympiacos	3–1	Asteras Tripolis	Olympic Stadium, Athens	28,980
2013–14	Panathinaikos	4–1	PAOK	Olympic Stadium, Athens	44,356
2014–15	Olympiacos	3–1	Xanthi	Olympic Stadium, Athens	26,300
2015–16	AEK Athens	2–1	Olympiacos	Olympic Stadium, Athens	Behind closed doors
2016–17	PAOK	2–1	AEK Athens	Panthessaliko Stadium, Volos	19,236
2017–18	PAOK	2–0	AEK Athens	Olympic Stadium, Athens	35,545
2018–19	PAOK	1–0	AEK Athens	Olympic Stadium, Athens	1,040
2019–20	Olympiacos	1–0	AEK Athens	Panthessaliko Stadium, Volos	Behind closed doors
2020–21	PAOK	2–1	Olympiacos	Olympic Stadium, Athens	Behind closed doors
2021–22	Panathinaikos	1–0	PAOK	Olympic Stadium, Athens	45,409
2022–23	AEK Athens	2–0	PAOK	Panthessaliko Stadium, Volos	Behind closed doors
2023–24	Panathinaikos	1–0	Aris	Panthessaliko Stadium, Volos	Behind closed doors
2024–25	Olympiacos	2–0	OFI	Olympic Stadium, Athens	55,000
2025–26	OFI	3–2	PAOK	Panthessaliko Stadium, Volos	20,108

Key to list of winners
(R)	Replay
	Match went to extra time
	Match decided by a penalty shoot-out after extra time
	Winning team won the double (League title and Greek Cup)

== Results by club ==
Greek Cup winners by club
Club	Winners	Runners-up	Years won	Years runner-up
Olympiacos	29	13 (Note: The 1962 final between Olympiacos and Panathinaikos was abandoned and was not replayed, so neither of them was declared a cup winner, as well as a runner-up. Both teams are considered finalists.)	1947, 1951, 1952, 1953, 1954, 1957, 1958, 1959, 1960, 1961, 1963, 1965, 1968, 1971, 1973, 1975, 1981, 1990, 1992, 1999, 2005, 2006, 2008, 2009, 2012, 2013, 2015, 2020, 2025	1956, 1966, 1969, 1974, 1976, 1986, 1988, 1993, 2001, 2002, 2004, 2016, 2021
Panathinaikos	20	10	1940, 1948, 1955, 1967, 1969, 1977, 1982, 1984, 1986, 1988, 1989, 1991, 1993, 1994, 1995, 2004, 2010, 2014, 2022, 2024	1949, 1960, 1965, 1968, 1972, 1975, 1997, 1998, 1999, 2007
AEK Athens	16	11	1932, 1939, 1949, 1950, 1956, 1964, 1966, 1978, 1983, 1996, 1997, 2000, 2002, 2011, 2016, 2023	1948, 1953, 1979, 1994, 1995, 2006, 2009, 2017, 2018, 2019, 2020
PAOK	8	16	1972, 1974, 2001, 2003, 2017, 2018, 2019, 2021	1939, 1951, 1955, 1970, 1971, 1973, 1977, 1978, 1981, 1983, 1985, 1992, 2014, 2022, 2023, 2026
Panionios	2	4	1979, 1998	1952, 1961, 1967, 1989
AEL	2	2	1985, 2007	1982, 1984
OFI	2	2	1987, 2026	1990, 2025
Aris	1	9	1970	1932, 1933, 1940, 1950, 2003, 2005, 2008, 2010, 2024
Iraklis	1	4	1976	1947, 1957, 1980, 1987
Ethnikos Piraeus	1	0	1933	—
Kastoria	1	0	1980	—
Doxa Drama	0	3	—	1954, 1958, 1959
Atromitos	0	2	—	2011, 2012
Pierikos	0	1	—	1963
Athinaikos	0	1	—	1991
Apollon Smyrnis	0	1	—	1996
Ionikos	0	1	—	2000
Asteras Tripolis	0	1	—	2013
Xanthi	0	1	—	2015

== See also ==
- Greek Football Cup
- Hellenic Football Federation
