= 1950 Greek Football Cup final =

1950 Greek Cup final
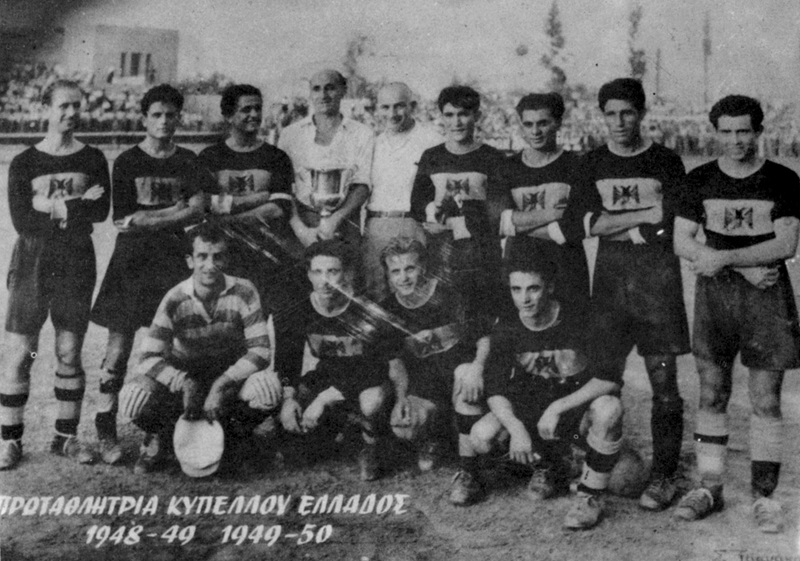
- AEK Athens with the Cup
- Event: 1949–50 Greek Football Cup
AEK Athens	Aris
4	0
- Date: 28 May 1950
- Venue: Leoforos Alexandras Stadium, Ampelokipoi, Athens
- Referee: Sotiris Asprogerakas (Athens)
- Attendance: 5,500

The 1950 Greek Cup final was the 8th final of the Greek Cup. The match took place on 28 May 1950 at Leoforos Alexandras Stadium. The contesting teams were AEK Athens and Aris. It was AEK Athens' fifth Greek Cup final and third consecutive in their 26 years of existence and Aris' fourth Greek Cup final in their 36-year history.

== Venue ==
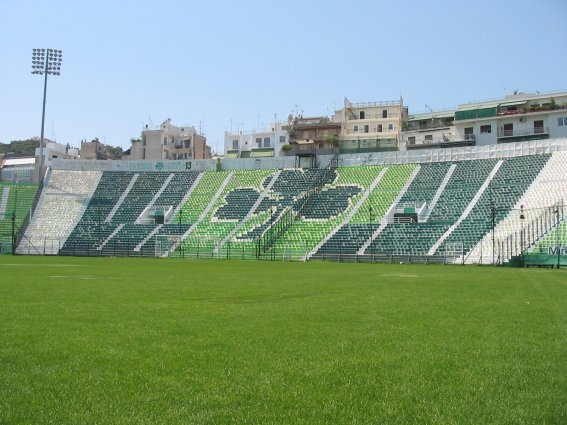
Leoforos Alexandras Stadium.

This was the seventh Greek Cup final held at Leoforos Alexandras Stadium, after the 1932, 1939, 1940, 1947, 1948 and 1949 finals. (Leoforos also hosted the replay match of the 1933 final between Ethnikos Piraeus and Aris and the replay match of the 1949 final between AEK Athens and Panathinaikos).

Leoforos Alexandras Stadium was built in 1922. The stadium is used as a venue for Panathinaikos and Greece. Its current capacity is 30,000.

== Background ==
AEK Athens had reached the Greek Cup final four times, winning three of them. The last time that they played in a final was in 1949, where they had won Panathinaikos by 2–1 in a replay match, after the 0–0 of the initial match.

Aris had reached the Greek Cup final three times. The last time that had played in a final was in 1940, where they had lost to Panathinaikos by 3–1.

The two teams had met each other in a Cup final one time in the 1932 final.

== Route to the final ==
AEK Athens				Round	Aris			
Opponent	Agg.	1st leg	2nd leg		Opponent	Agg.	1st leg	2nd leg
Niki Ampelokipoi	12–0 (H)			First round	Bye			
Sparta	9–1 (H)			Second round	Bye			
Bye				Third round	Bye			
Bye				Fourth round	Bye			
AE Pangrati	2–0 (H)			Fifth round	Bye			
Bye				Sixth round	Bye			
Olympiacos	2–0	0–0 (a.e.t.) (A)	2–0 (H)	Round of 16	Elpida Drama	3–1 (A)		
Apollon Athens	2–0 (c)	2–2 (a.e.t.) (H)	0–0 (a.e.t.) (A)	Quarter-finals	PAOK	6–4	3–3 (a.e.t.) (H)	3–1 (A)
Panathinaikos	4–2	1–1 (a.e.t.) (H)	3–1 (a.e.t.) (A)	Semi-finals	Ethnikos Piraeus	2–1 (H)		

== Match ==
=== Details ===
28 May 1950
17:15 EET

AEK Athens	4–0	Aris
Maropoulos 6'; Arvanitis 45'; Kountouris 63', 67'	Report (page 2)

Leoforos Alexandras Stadium, Ampelokipoi
Attendance: 5,500
Referee: Sotiris Asprogerakas (Athens)

GK	1	(Greece) Michalis Delavinias
DF	2	(Greece) Antonis Parayios
DF	3	(Greece) Youlielmos Arvanitis
MF	4	(Greece) Michalis Papatheodorou
MF	5	(Greece) Tryfon Tzanetis
MF	6	(Greece) Kostas Poulis
FW	7	(Greece) Stathis Lazaridis
FW	8	(Greece) Pavlos Emmanouilidis
FW	9	(Greece) Kleanthis Maropoulos (c)
FW	10	(Greece) Panagiotis Patakas
FW	11	(Greece) Manolis Kountouris
Manager:
(England) Jack Beby

GK	1	(Greece) Kostas Velliadis
DF	2	(Greece) Vachak Abrachamian (c)
DF	3	(Greece) Takis Nikolaidis
MF	4	(Greece) Simos Kaftantzis
MF	5	(Greece) Giannis Grigoriadis
MF	6	(Greece) Leonidas Pozanis
FW	7	(Greece) Stelios Papoutsopoulos
FW	8	(Greece) Giannis Liakopoulos
FW	9	(Greece) Dimitris Kazantzis
FW	10	(Greece) Dimitris Kaltekis
FW	11	(Greece) Lefteris Chalyvopoulos
Manager:
(Greece) Iakovos Giakoumis

Assistant referees:
Tzilos (Piraeus)
Diamantopoulos (Athens)

Match rules

- 90 minutes
- 30 minutes of extra time if necessary
- Replay match if scores still level

== See also ==
- 1949–50 Greek Football Cup
