= 1949 Greek Football Cup final =

1949 Greek Cup final
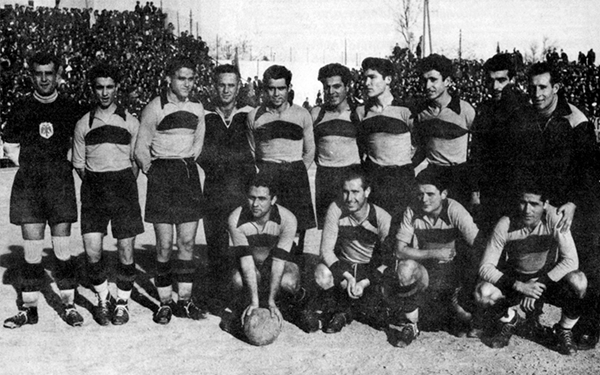
- AEK Athens' squad in the final
- Event: 1948–49 Greek Football Cup
| AEK Athens | Panathinaikos |
- AEK Athens won after a replay
| AEK Athens | Panathinaikos |
| 0 | 0 |
- After extra time
- Date: 19 June 1949
- Venue: Leoforos Alexandras Stadium, Ampelokipoi, Athens
- Referee: Aristidis Ioannidis (Thessaloniki)
- Attendance: 15,000

Replay
| Panathinaikos | AEK Athens |
| 1 | 2 |
- After extra time
- Date: 3 July 1949
- Venue: Leoforos Alexandras Stadium, Ampelokipoi, Athens
- Referee: Giannis Daskalakis (Piraeus)
- Attendance: 15,000

The 1949 Greek Cup final was the 7th final of the Greek Cup. The initial match took place on 19 June 1949 and the replay match took place on 3 July 1949 at Leoforos Alexandras Stadium. The contesting teams were AEK Athens and Panathinaikos for a second time in a row. It was AEK Athens' fourth Greek Cup final and second consecutive in their 25 years of existence and Panathinaikos' third Greek Cup final and second consecutive in their 41-year history. The initial match was abandoned at the 19th minute of extra time due to darkness, as the HFF had set the kick-off at 18:00, without foreseeing the possibility of extra time, a fact that of course provoked criticism against them.

== Venue ==
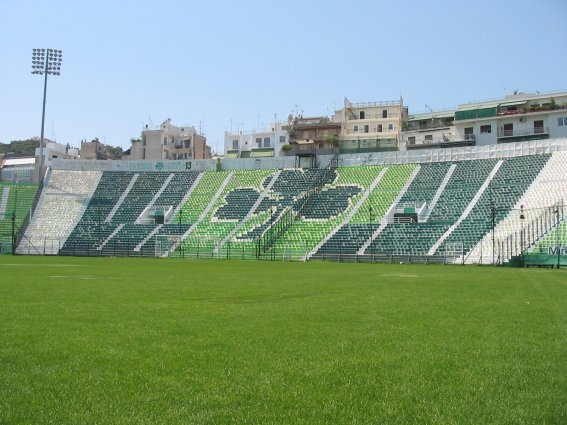
Leoforos Alexandras Stadium.

This was the sixth Greek Cup final held at Leoforos Alexandras Stadium, after the 1932, 1939, 1940, 1947 and 1948 finals. (Leoforos also hosted the replay match of the 1933 final between Ethnikos Piraeus and Aris).

Leoforos Alexandras Stadium was built in 1922. The stadium is used as a venue for Panathinaikos and Greece. Its current capacity is 30,000.

== Background ==
AEK Athens had reached the Greek Cup final three times, winning two of them. The last time that they had won the Cup was in 1939 (2–1 against PAOK). The last time that had played in a final was in 1948, where they had lost to Panathinaikos by 2–1.

Panathinaikos had reached the Greek Cup final two times winning all of them. The last time that had played in a final was in 1948, where they had won AEK Athens by 2–1.

The two teams had met each other in a Cup final one time in the 1948 final.

== Route to the final ==
| AEK Athens | | Round | Panathinaikos | |
|---|---|---|---|---|
| Opponent | Result | | Opponent | Result |
| Ergotelis | 9–1 (A) | Round of 16 | Ethnikos Piraeus | 2–0 (H) |
| Iraklis Kavala | 4–1 (A) | Quarter-finals | Apollon Athens | 4–1 (H) |
| Olympiacos | 2–1 (H) | Semi-finals | PAOK | 1–0 (A) |

== Match ==
=== Details ===
19 June 1949
18:00 EET

| AEK Athens | 0–0 (a.e.t.) | Panathinaikos |
|---|---|---|
| | Report |

Leoforos Alexandras Stadium, Athens
Attendance: 15,000
Referee: Aristidis Ioannidis (Thessaloniki)

The match was abandoned at the 109 minute.

| GK | 1 | (Greece) Napoleon Tavlas |
| DF | 2 | (Greece) Antonis Parayios |
| DF | 3 | (Greece) Youlielmos Arvanitis |
| MF | 4 | (Greece) Michalis Papatheodorou |
| MF | 5 | (Greece) Tryfon Tzanetis |
| MF | 6 | (Greece) Kostas Poulis |
| FW | 7 | (Greece) Stathis Lazaridis |
| FW | 8 | (Greece) Xenofon Markopoulos |
| FW | 9 | (Greece) Pavlos Emmanouilidis |
| FW | 10 | (Greece) Kleanthis Maropoulos (c) |
| FW | 11 | (Greece) Manolis Kountouris |
Manager:
(England) Jack Beby

| GK | (Greece) Mathios Vitalis |
| DF | (Greece) Ilias Stafylidis |
| DF | (Greece) Michalis Kyriazopoulos |
| MF | (Greece) Alekos Chionidis |
| MF | (Greece) Vangelis Nikolopoulos |
| MF | (Greece) Christos Nikolaidis |
| FW | (Greece) Stefanos Dialetis |
| FW | (Greece) Nikos Simos (c) |
| FW | (Greece) Giannis Petsanas |
| FW | (Greece) Kostas Tsitouris |
| FW | (Greece) Babis Fylaktos |
Manager:
(Austria) Johann Strnad

Assistant referees:
Giannis Daskalakis (Piraeus)
Achilleas Gramatikopoulos (Athens)

Match rules

- 90 minutes
- 30 minutes of extra time if necessary
- Replay match if scores still level

== Replay ==
=== Details ===
3 July 1949
17:30 EET

| AEK Athens | 2–1 (a.e.t.) | Panathinaikos |
|---|---|---|
| Patakas 10', 105' | Report | Fylaktos 69' |

Leoforos Alexandras Stadium, Athens
Attendance: 15,000
Referee: Giannis Daskalakis (Piraeus)

| GK | 1 | (Greece) Napoleon Tavlas |
| DF | 2 | (Greece) Antonis Parayios |
| DF | 3 | (Greece) Youlielmos Arvanitis |
| MF | 4 | (Greece) Michalis Papatheodorou |
| MF | 5 | (Greece) Tryfon Tzanetis |
| MF | 6 | (Greece) Kostas Poulis |
| FW | 7 | (Greece) Stathis Lazaridis |
| FW | 8 | (Greece) Xenofon Markopoulos |
| FW | 9 | (Greece) Pavlos Emmanouilidis |
| FW | 10 | (Greece) Kleanthis Maropoulos (c) |
| FW | 11 | (Greece) Panagiotis Patakas |
Manager:
(England) Jack Beby

| GK | (Greece) Mathios Vitalis |
| DF | (Greece) Ilias Stafylidis |
| DF | (Greece) Michalis Kyriazopoulos |
| MF | (Greece) Alekos Chionidis |
| MF | (Greece) Vangelis Nikolopoulos |
| MF | (Greece) Christos Nikolaidis |
| FW | (Greece) Stefanos Dialetis |
| FW | (Greece) Nikos Simos (c) |
| FW | (Greece) Giannis Petsanas |
| FW | (Greece) Kostas Tsitouris |
| FW | (Greece) Babis Fylaktos |
Manager:
(Austria) Johann Strnad

Assistant referees:
Mexis
Kleidourakis

Match rules

- 90 minutes
- 30 minutes of extra time if necessary
- Coin toss if scores still level

== See also ==
- 1948–49 Greek Football Cup
