= 1948 Greek Football Cup final =

1948 Greek Cup final
- Event: 1947–48 Greek Football Cup
Panathinaikos	AEK Athens
2	1
- Date: 20 June 1948
- Venue: Leoforos Alexandras Stadium, Ampelokipoi, Athens
- Referee: Kostas Tzitzis (Athens)
- Attendance: 12,000

The 1948 Greek Cup final was the 6th final of the Greek Cup. The match took place on 20 June 1948 at Leoforos Alexandras Stadium. The contesting teams were Panathinaikos and AEK Athens. It was Panathinaikos' second Greek Cup final in their 40 years of existence and AEK Athens' third Greek Cup final in their 24-year history.

== Venue ==
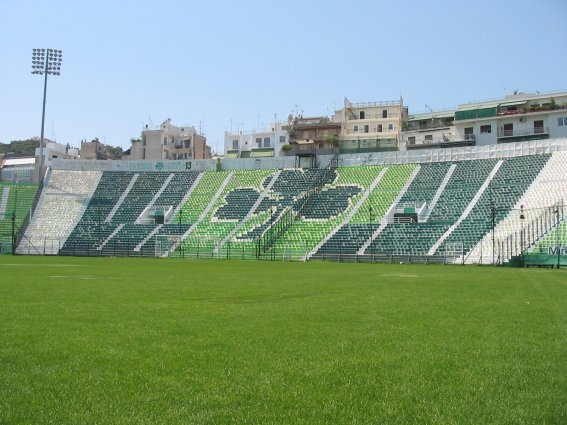
Leoforos Alexandras Stadium.

This was the fifth Greek Cup final held at Leoforos Alexandras Stadium, after the 1932, 1939, 1940 and 1947 finals. (Leoforos also hosted the replay match of the 1933 final between Ethnikos Piraeus and Aris).

Leoforos Alexandras Stadium was built in 1922. The stadium is used as a venue for Panathinaikos and Greece. Its current capacity is 30,000.

== Background ==
Panathinaikos had reached the Greek Cup final one time in 1940, where they had won Aris by 3–1.

AEK Athens had reached the Greek Cup final two times, winning all of them. The last time that had played in a final was in 1939, where they had won PAOK by 2–1.

The two teams had never met each other in a Cup final.

== Route to the final ==
Panathinaikos		Round	AEK Athens	
Opponent	Result		Opponent	Result
Olympiacos Patras	4–0 (A)	Twelfth round	Bye	
Elpida Drama	7–1 (H)	Quarter-finals	Atromitos Piraeus	4–3 (H)
Asteras Athens	3–1 (H)	Semi-finals	Olympiacos	1–0 (H)

== Match ==
=== Details ===
20 June 1948
17:30 EET

Panathinaikos	2–1	AEK Athens
Simos 16', 49'	Report (page 1)	Maropoulos 20'

Leoforos Alexandras Stadium, Athens
Attendance: 12,000
Referee: Kostas Tzitzis (Athens)

GK	1	(Greece) Mathios Vitalis
DF	2	(Greece) Anastasios Kritikos
DF	3	(Greece) Spyros Bogdanos
MF	4	(Greece) Gavrilos Gazis
MF	5	(Greece) Vangelis Nikolopoulos
MF	6	(Greece) Alekos Chionidis
FW	7	(Greece) Babis Fylaktos
FW	8	(Greece) Nikos Simos (c)
FW	9	(Greece) Giannis Petsanas
FW	10	(Greece) Antonis Papantoniou
FW	11	(Greece) Stefanos Dialetis
Manager:
(Greece) Antonis Migiakis

GK	1	(Greece) Michalis Delavinias
DF	2	(Greece) Giorgos Gasparis
DF	3	(Greece) Youlielmos Arvanitis
MF	4	(Greece) Giannis Vlantis
MF	5	(Greece) Tryfon Tzanetis
MF	6	(Greece) Georgios Magiras
FW	7	(Greece) Giannis Papantoniou
FW	8	(Greece) Kleanthis Maropoulos (c)
FW	9	(Greece) Xenofon Markopoulos
FW	10	(Greece) Pavlos Emmanouilidis
FW	11	(Greece) Lelos Adamidis
Manager:
(Greece) Kostas Negrepontis

Assistant referees:
Manolis Zapardas (Piraeus)
Vrachas

Match rules

- 90 minutes
- 30 minutes of extra time if necessary
- Replay match if scores still level

== See also ==
- 1947–48 Greek Football Cup
