= 1953 Greek Football Cup final =

1953 Greek Cup final
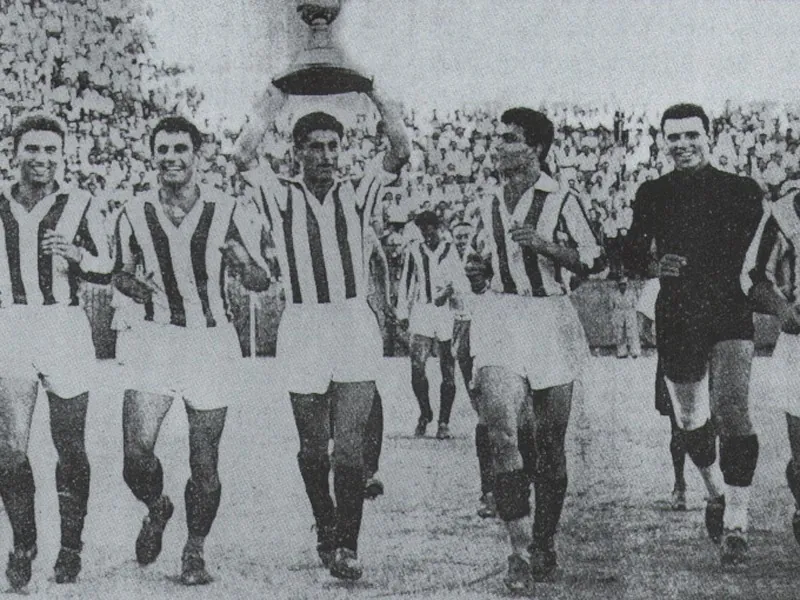
- Olympiacos after the final
- Event: 1952–53 Greek Football Cup
Olympiacos	AEK Athens
3	2
- Date: 17 May 1953
- Venue: Leoforos Alexandras Stadium, Ampelokipoi, Athens
- Referee: Manolis Zapardas (Piraeus)
- Attendance: 25,000

The 1953 Greek Cup final was the 11th final of the Greek Cup. The match took place on 17 May 1953 at Leoforos Alexandras Stadium. The contesting teams were Olympiacos and AEK Athens. It was Olympiacos' fourth Greek Cup final and third consecutive in their 28 years of existence and AEK Athens' sixth Greek Cup final in their 29-year history.

== Venue ==
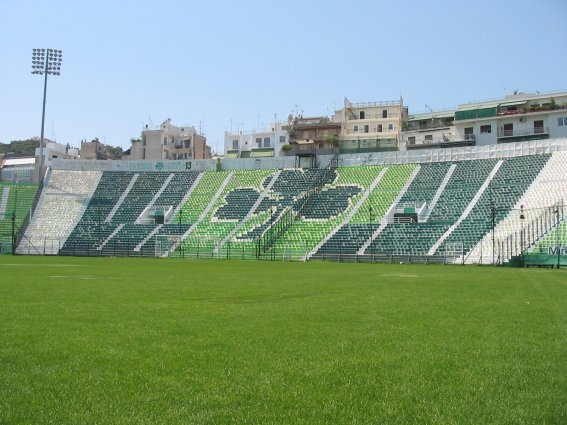
Leoforos Alexandras Stadium.

This was the tenth Greek Cup final held at Leoforos Alexandras Stadium, after the 1932, 1939, 1940, 1947, 1948, 1949, 1950, 1951 and 1952 finals. (Leoforos also hosted the replay match of the 1933 final between Ethnikos Piraeus and Aris, the replay match of the 1949 final between AEK Athens and Panathinaikos and the replay match of the 1952 final between Olympiacos and Panionios).

Leoforos Alexandras Stadium was built in 1922. The stadium is used as a venue for Panathinaikos and Greece. Its current capacity is 30,000.

== Background ==
Olympiacos had reached the Greek Cup final three times, winning all of them. The last time that they played in a final was in 1952, where they had won Panionios by 2–0 in a replay match, after the 2–2 of the initial match.

AEK Athens had reached the Greek Cup final five times, winning four of them. The last time that they played in a final was in 1950, where they had won Aris by 4–0.

The two teams had never met each other in a Cup final.

== Route to the final ==
Olympiacos		Round	AEK Athens	
Opponent	Result		Opponent	Result
AE Chalandri	4–1 (H)	Round of 16	Panelefsiniakos	4–1 (H)
Fostiras	3–1 (A)	Quarter-finals	Aris	1–0 (A)
Panathinaikos	2–1 (A)	Semi-finals	Panionios	2–1 (A)

== Match ==
=== Details ===
17 May 1953
17:00 EET

Olympiacos	3–2	AEK Athens
Kansos 21', 37'; Darivas 79'	Report	Serafidis 83'; Kanakis 88'

Leoforos Alexandras Stadium, Ampelokipoi
Attendance: 25,000
Referee: Manolis Zapardas (Piraeus)

GK	1	(Greece) Kostas Karapatis
DF	2	(Greece) Ilias Rosidis
DF	3	(Greece) Thanasis Kingley
DF	4	(Greece) Andreas Mouratis (c)
MF	5	(Greece) Vasilis Xanthopoulos
MF	6	(Greece) Thanasis Bebis
FW	7	(Greece) Giorgos Kansos
FW	8	(Greece) Dimitrios Kokkinakis
FW	9	(Greece) Giorgos Kopanidis
FW	10	(Greece) Georgios Darivas
FW	11	(Greece) Babis Drosos
Manager:
(Greece) Giannis Chelmis, (Greece) Vangelis Chelmis

GK	1	(Greece) Michalis Delavinias
DF	2	(Greece) Antonis Parayios
DF	3	(Greece) Youlielmos Arvanitis (c)
DF	4	(Greece) Christos Darakis
MF	5	(Greece) Manesis
MF	6	(Greece) Michalis Papatheodorou
FW	7	(Greece) Pavlos Emmanouilidis
FW	8	(Greece) Giannis Kanakis
FW	9	(Greece) Ilias Papageorgiou
FW	10	(Greece) Andreas Stamatiadis
FW	11	(Greece) Lambis Serafidis
Manager:
(Italy) Mario Magnozzi

Assistant referees:
Vangelis Damalitis (Piraeus)
Anagnostopoulos

Match rules

- 90 minutes
- 30 minutes of extra time if necessary
- Replay match if scores still level

== See also ==
- 1952–53 Greek Football Cup
