= Xenofon Markopoulos =

Greek footballer (born 1921)

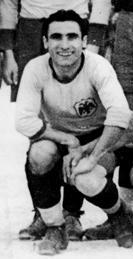
- Xenofon Markopoulos with AEK Athens

Personal information
- Full name: Xenofontas Markopoulos
- Date of birth: 1 January 1921
- Place of birth: Constantinople, Ottoman Empire
- Date of death: 1992 (aged 71)
- Place of death: Greece
- Height: 1.63 m (5 ft 4 in)
- Position: Forward

Youth career
- –1938: Panvyzantinos Kalogreza
- 1938: AEK Athens

Senior career*
Years	Team	Apps	(Gls)
1938–1951	AEK Athens	12	(3)
1952–1955	Eleftheroupoli		
Total		12	(3)

International career
1948–1949	Greece	5	(2)
- * Club domestic league appearances and goals

Xenofon Markopoulos (Greek: Ξενοφών Μαρκόπουλος; 1 January 1921 – 1992), also known as "Xenos" in short, was a Greek footballer who played as a forward.

== Club career ==
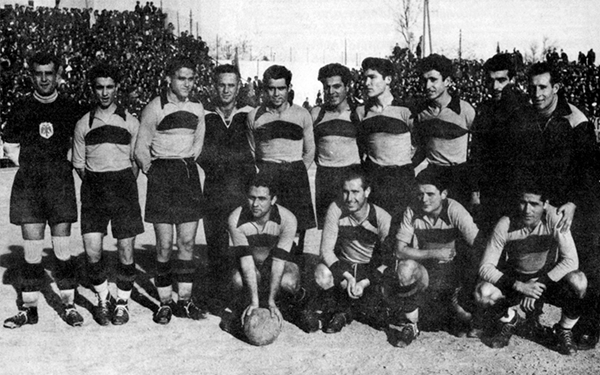
Markopoulos with AEK in 1949

In the aftermath of the Asia Minor Disaster and after his family’s relocation to Kalogreza in 1922, Markopoulos began his football career with Pamvyzantinos Kalogreza. In August 1938, he moved to AEK Athens, where he didn't take him long to make his debut with the senior squad. On 3 July 1949, he participated in the Greek Cup final at Leoforos Alexandras Stadium, where AEK achieved victory over Panathinaikos, securing the coveted title. Over the course of his career, he gained recognition as a proficient authority in the skill of heading the ball into the net. Throughout his time at AEK Athens, he won 2 consecutive Panhellenic Championships, 3 Cups and 4 Athens FCA Championships, including the first domestic double achieved by a Greek club in 1939. On 17 May 1951, AEK played a friendly match against First Vienna at Nea Filadelfeia Stadium, losing 3–0. After the match, the board of AEK announced a six-month suspension for Markopoulos, stating that he had refused to compete in the second half and had left the stadium. Markopoulos denied the allegations, claiming that he had not initially been included in the squad and only appeared at the dressing room shortly before kick-off. According to the player, he was asked to play due to injury problems affecting Kanakis and Tzavaras, while he requested to be substituted at half-time because of severe stomach pain.

In 1952, Markopoulos joined Eleftheroupoli, where he played until 1955, when he ended his football career.

== International career ==
Markopoulos played in five games with Greece and scored two goals, between 1948 and 1949. His debut took place on 23 April 1948 in Greece's first post-war match, a home friendly against Turkey.

== Personal life ==
Markopoulos had a son named Thodoris, who also followed the career of a footballer.

== Honours ==
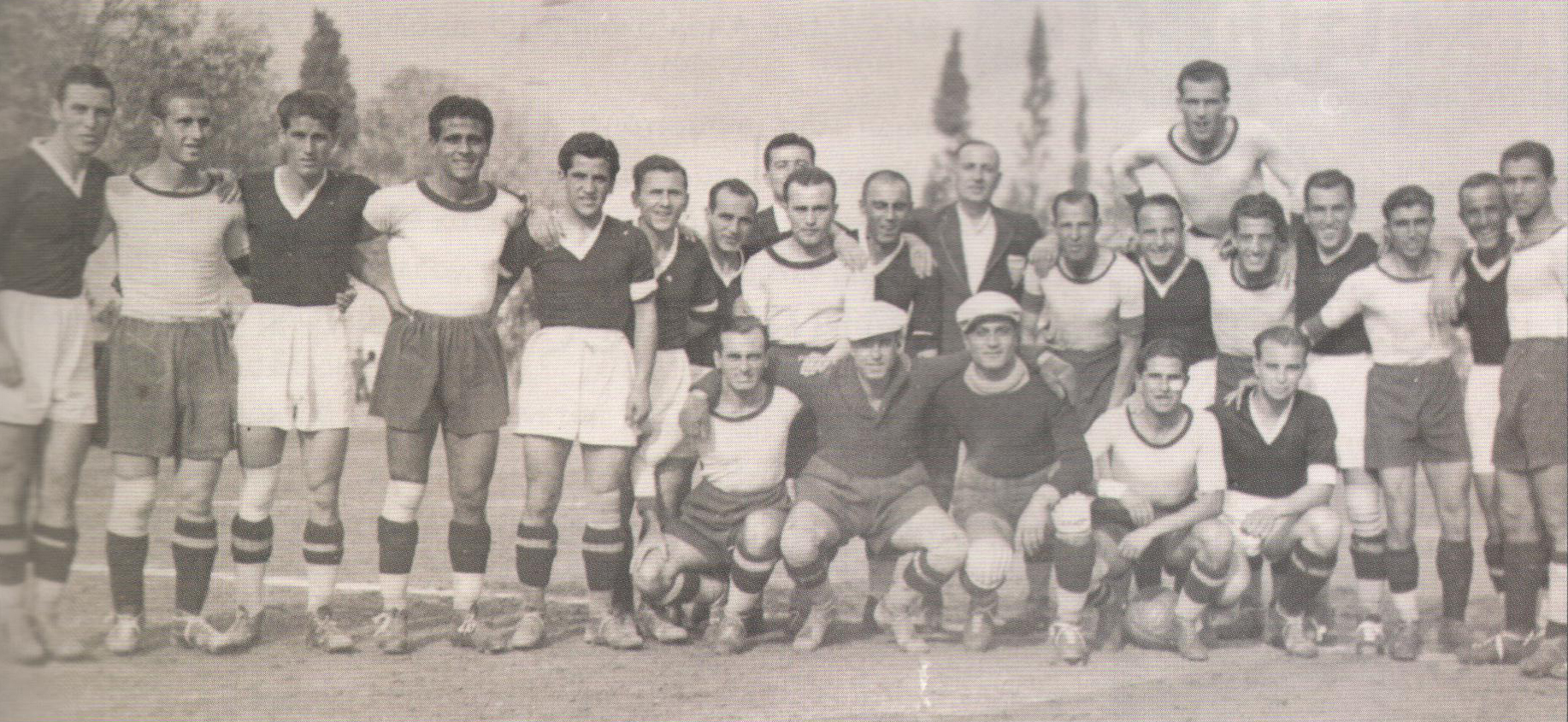
Players of AEK Athens and PAOK before the 1939 Cup final

AEK Athens

- Panhellenic Championship: 1938–39, 1939–40
- Greek Cup: 1938–39, 1948–49, 1949–50
- Athens FCA League: 1940, 1946, 1947, 1950

Individual

- Greek Cup top scorer: 1948–49
