= 1947–48 Greek Football Cup =

1947–48 Greek Cup
Tournament details
- Country: Greece
- Teams: 127

Final positions
- Champions: Panathinaikos (2nd title)
- Runners-up: AEK Athens

Tournament statistics
- Matches played: 128
- Goals scored: 443 (3.46 per match)

The 1947–48 Greek Football Cup was the sixth edition of the Greek Football Cup. The competition culminated with the Greek Cup final, held at Leoforos Alexandras Stadium, on 20 June 1948. The match was contested by Panathinaikos and AEK Athens, with Panathinaikos winning by 2–1.

== Calendar ==
Round	Date(s)	Fixtures	Clubs	New entries
First Round	5 October 1947	23	127 → 102	52
Second Round	12 October 1947	6	102 → 96	8
Third Round	19 October 1947	19	96 → 75	17
Fourth Round	26 October 1947	10	75 → 68	13
Fifth Round	2, 6 November 1947	6	68 → 63	1
Sixth Round	16, 19 November 1947	21	63 → 43	23
Seventh Round	23, 26 November 1947	6	43 → 38	6
Eighth Round	30 November 1947	2	38 → 35	none
Ninth Round	7, 8, 21 December 1947	8	35 → 28	1
Tenth Round	11, 18, 25, 28 January 1948	8	28 → 21	none
Eleventh Round	8, 15, 18 February, 3 March 1948	6	21 → 13	3
Twelfth Round		5	13 → 8	5
Quarter-finals	21 May 1948	5	8 → 4	none
Semi-finals	30 May 1948	2	4 → 2	none
Final	20 June 1948	1	2 → 1	none

== Qualification round ==
=== First round ===
Team 1	Score	Team 2
Central Greece/Islands Football Clubs Association
Yperochi	2–6	Attikos
Viktoria	9–3	Archimidis Piraeus
Ionikos Nea Filadelfeia	2–0 (w/o)	Arion Athens
AE Nea Ionia	2–0 (w/o)	Pantzitzifiakos
Armeniki	1–5	Ilisiakos
Kallithaikos	5–4	Faliriki
Piraikos	1–5	AE Ampelokipoi
Filathloi Piraeus	6–3	Ampelakiakos Salamina
AE Karava	2–4	Mikrasiatiki
Aiolikos Faliro	2–0	Niki Plaka
Panerythraikos	2–3	Niki Ampelokipoi
Atromitos	2–1	Falirikos
AE Chalandri	2–1	Agios Dimitrios
Egaleo	1–2	AE Nea Elvetia
Achilleus Korinthos	6–0	Aris Korinthos
Patras/Western Greece Football Clubs Association
AEK Aigio	1–3	Asteras Patras
Proodeftiki Patras	4–1	Aris Patras
Panachaiki	4–0	Ethnikos Aigio
Olympiakos Patras	4–1	Achaiki
Patreus	1–2	AEK Patras
AE Messolonghi	1–2	Achilleus Patras
Panetolikos	0–2^{1} (w/o)	Apollon Patras
Euboea/Boeotia/Lamia Football Clubs Association
Propontis Chalkida	5–1	AEK Chalkida
Orchomenos	1–1	Pallevadiaki
Thessaloniki Football Clubs Association
Meliteus	8–0	Olympiacos Terpsithea
PO Xirokrini	2–0 (w/o)	Thermaikos

^{1} The match was suspended at the 84th minute in expense of Panetolikos while they were 3–1 in front.

=== Second round ===
Team 1	Score/Agg.	Team 2	Match	Replay
Central Greece/Islands Football Clubs Association
Esperos Kallitheas	4–1	Achilleus Piraeus		
AE Pangrati	2–0	Argonaftis Piraeus		
AE Nea Ionia	3–0	Ionikos Nea Filadelfeia		
Crete Football Clubs Association
OFI	1–3	Ergotelis		
Euboea/Boeotia/Lamia Football Clubs Association
Orchomenos	2–1	Pallevadiaki	?	2–1
Aris Thiva	2–1	Enosis Chalkida		

=== Third round ===
Team 1	Score	Team 2
Central Greece/Islands Football Clubs Association
Filathloi Piraeus	5–4	Kronos
AE Nea Ionia	1–2	Attikos
Ilisiakos	1–0	AE Ampelokipoi
Viktoria	2–0	Aiolikos Faliro
Mikrasiatiki	3–2	AE Nea Elvetia
Atromitos	2–1	Kallithaikos
AE Pangrati	2–1	Esperos Kallitheas
Niki Ampelokipoi	2–1	AE Chalandri
Olympiacos Loutraki	4–3	Olympiacos Korinthos
Patras/Western Greece Football Clubs Association
Asteras Patras	2–1	AEK Patras
Apollon Patras	2–0	Achilleus Patras
Olympiakos Patras	3–1	Proodeftiki Patras
Panegialios	2–3	Thyella Patras
Iraklis Pyrgos	1–2	Ethnikos Pyrgos
Crete Football Clubs Association
EGOH	?	Ermis
Euboea/Boeotia/Lamia Football Clubs Association
Propontis Chalkida	(w/o)^{2}	Olympiacos Chalkida
Orchomenos	?	Panthivaikos
Thessaloniki Football Clubs Association
MENT	2–4	PO Xirokrini
Thrace/Central-Eastern Macedonia Football Clubs Association
Aspida Xanthi	?	Tourkiki Enosis
Apollon Serres	3–0	Orfeas Serres

^{2} Both clubs didn't show up and they were disqualified.

=== Fourth round ===
Team 1	Score/Agg.	Team 2	Match	Replay
Central Greece/Islands Football Clubs Association
A.O. Kifisia	4–3	Ethnikos Asteras	?	4–3
Mikrasiatiki	4–4 (a.e.t.)	Atromitos		
Viktoria	2–4	Niki Ampelokipoi		
AE Pangrati	1–2	Attikos		
Ilisiakos	3–1	Filathloi Piraeus		
Patras/Western Greece Football Clubs Association
Apollon Kalamata	3–0	Ethnikos Pyrgos		
Euboea/Boeotia/Lamia Football Clubs Association
Olympiacos Lamia	2–0 (w/o)	Pallamiaki		
Thrace/Central-Eastern Macedonia Football Clubs Association
AEK Kavala	?	Iraklis Kavala		
Doxa Drama	?	Vyron Drama		
Orfeas Xanthi	?	Doxa Xanthi		
Iraklis Serres	?	Filoproodos Neolea Pentapolis		

=== Fifth round ===
Team 1	Score/Agg.	Team 2	Match	Replay
Central Greece/Islands Football Clubs Association
Achilleus Korinthos	1–2	Pelops Kiatou		
Mikrasiatiki	?	Atromitos	?	?
Patras/Western Greece Football Clubs Association
Panachaiki	4–1	Asteras Patras		
Olympiacos Patras	1–0	Thyella Patras	0–0 (a.e.t.)	1–0 (a.e.t.)
Thrace/Central-Eastern Macedonia Football Clubs Association
Iraklis Serres	4–2	Filoproodos Neolea Pentapolis	?	4–2

=== Sixth round ===
Team 1	Score/Agg.	Team 2	Match	Replay
Central Greece/Islands Football Clubs Association
Apollon Athens	1–0	Ilisiakos		
Athinaikos	0–3	Asteras Athens		
Daphni Athens	1–0	Neapolis		
Panelefsiniakos	5–1	Aris Piraeus		
Ethnikos Piraeus	3–2	Amyna Piraeus		
Pallesviakos	0–3	Proodeftiki		
Attikos	0–2	Mikrasiatiki		
Hellas Syros	1–4	Fostiras		
Olympiacos Loutraki	0–2	A.O. Kifisia		
Pelops Kiatou	1–2	Niki Ampelokipoi		
Patras/Western Greece Football Clubs Association
Olympiacos Patras	2–1	Panachaiki		
Apollon Kalamata	2–0 (w/o)^{3}	Apollon Patras		
Crete Football Clubs Association
Ergotelis	6–2	EGOH		
Euboea/Boeotia/Lamia Football Clubs Association
Aris Thiva	1–2	Orchomenos		
Thessaly Football Clubs Association
Pagasitikos Volos	3–0^{4}	Olympiacos Volos		
Niki Volos	5–4^{5}	Kentavros Volos		
Thessaloniki Football Clubs Association
PAOK	4–2	Meliteus		
PO Xirokrini	4–2	Apollon Kalamarias		
Thrace/Central-Eastern Macedonia Football Clubs Association
AEK Kavala	3–2	Iraklis Kavala	?	3–2
Orfeas Eleftheroupoli	2–2	Elpis Drama		
Orfeas Komotini	?	Aspida Xanthi		

^{3} The match ended 0–1, but Apollon Patras were zeroed for illegal usage of football players.

^{4} Suspended at the 85th minute at the expense of Olympiacos Volos.

^{5} Suspended at the 80th minute at the expense of Kentavros Volos.

=== Seventh round ===
Team 1	Score/Agg.	Team 2	Match	Replay
Thessaly Football Clubs Association
Toxotis Larissa	1–0	Aris Larissa		
Iraklis Larissa	3–2	Larisaikos		
Anagennisis Volos	?	Niki Volos	0–0 (a.e.t.)	?
Thrace/Central-Eastern Macedonia Football Clubs Association
Orfeas Eleftheroupoli	?	Elpis Drama	?	?
Iraklis Serres	2–0 (w/o)^{6}	Ethnikos Sidirokastro		

^{6}The match ended 0–1, but Ethnikos Sidirokastro were zeroed for illegal usage of football players.

=== Eighth round ===
Team 1	Score	Team 2
Central Greece/Islands Football Clubs Association
Proodeftiki	2–0 (w/o)	A.O. Kifisia
Thessaly Football Clubs Association
Pagasitikos Volos	1–3	Niki Volos
Iraklis Larissa	2–0	Toxotis Larissa

=== Ninth round ===
Team 1	Score	Team 2
Central Greece/Islands Football Clubs Association
Mikrasiatiki	0–1	Niki Ampelokipoi
Central Greece/Islands Football Clubs Association
Olympiakos Patras	4–0^{7}	Apollon Kalamata
Euboea/Boeotia/Lamia Football Clubs Association
Olympiacos Lamia	?	Orchomenos
Thessaly Football Clubs Association
Niki Volos	1–2	Iraklis Larissa
Thessaloniki Football Clubs Association
Aris	2–0	PO Xirokrini
Thrace/Central-Eastern Macedonia Football Clubs Association
Filipoi Kavala	?	AEK Kavala
Doxa Drama	?	?
Apollon Serres	2–2^{8}	Iraklis Serres

^{7} Suspended at the 54th minute due to rainfall while the score was 2–0. The match was replayed on the following day.

^{8} Abandoned due to departure of the referee.

=== Tenth round ===
Team 1	Score/Agg.	Team 2	Match	Replay
Central Greece/Islands Football Clubs Association
Apollon Athens	0–1	Fostiras		
Ethnikos Piraeus	4–1	Daphni Athens		
Panelefsiniakos	2–1	Proodeftiki		
Asteras Athens	4–1	Niki Ampelokipoi		
Thessaloniki Football Clubs Association
PAOK	2–5	Aris		
Thrace/Central-Eastern Macedonia Football Clubs Association
Aspida Xanthi	?	Orfeas Neolea Xanthi		
Apollon Serres	1–3	Iraklis Serres	1–1 (a.e.t.)^{9}	0–2^{10}

^{9} The initial match that was abandoned while the score was 2–2, due to the departure of the referee and it was replayed.

^{10} The match ended 2–0, but Apollon Serres were zeroed for illegal usage of football players.

=== Eleventh round ===
Team 1	Score	Team 2
Central Greece/Islands Football Clubs Association
Fostiras	0–1	Asteras Athens
Ethnikos Piraeus	2–4	Panelefsiniakos
Thessaloniki Football Clubs Association
Aris	0–2	Megas Alexandros
Iraklis^{11}	3–1 (a.e.t.)	Makedonikos
Thrace/Central-Eastern Macedonia Football Clubs Association
AEK Kavala	2–0 (w/o)	Aspida Xanthi
Elpis Drama	1–0	AEK Kavala
Iraklis Serres	0–6	Elpis Drama

^{11} Iraklis were disqualified as punishment of their footballers' incidents in a previous match.

== Knockout phase ==
In the knockout phase, teams play against each other over a single match. If the match ends up as a draw, extra time will be played and if the match remains a draw a replay match is set at the home of the guest team which the extra time rule stands as well. That procedure will be repeated until a winner occurs.
The mechanism of the draws for each round is as follows:

- In the draw for the twelfth, the five top teams of each association are seeded and the eight clubs that passed the qualification round are unseeded.
  Three of the seeded teams are drawn against three of the unseeded teams. The rest three of the seeded times proceed to the quarter-finals while the remaining four of the unseeded teams are drawn against each other.
- In the draws for the quarter-finals onwards, there are no seedings, and teams from the same group can be drawn against each other.

== Bracket ==
Twelfth round
Olympiacos Patras	0
Panathinaikos	4
Megas Alexandros	0
Elpis Drama	1
Panelefsiniakos	0
Asteras Athens	3
Ergotelis	1
Panionios	6
AEK Athens (bye)
Atromitos Piraeus (bye)
Iraklis Larissa (w/o)	2
Olympiacos Lamia	0
Olympiacos (bye)

Quarter-finals
Panathinaikos	7
Elpis Drama	1
Asteras Athens	1	2
Panionios	1	0
AEK Athens	4
Atromitos Piraeus	3
Iraklis Larissa	0
Olympiacos	6

Semi-finals
Panathinaikos	1
Asteras Athens	0
AEK Athens	1
Olympiacos	0

Final
Panathinaikos	2
AEK Athens	1

== Twelfth round ==
Team 1	Score	Team 2
Olympiacos Patras	0–4	Panathinaikos
Megas Alexandros	0–1	Elpis Drama
Ergotelis	1–6	Panionios
Panelefsiniakos	0–3	Asteras Athens
Iraklis Larissa	2–0 (w/o)	Olympiacos Lamia
Olympiacos	bye	
AEK Athens	bye	
Atromitos Piraeus	bye	

== Quarter-finals ==
Team 1	Score/Agg.	Team 2	Match	Replay
Panathinaikos	7–1	Elpida Drama		
AEK Athens	4–3	Atromitos Piraeus		
Iraklis Larissa	0–6	Olympiacos		
Asteras Athens	3–1	Panionios	1–1	2–0

== Semi-finals ==
Team 1	Score	Team 2
AEK Athens	1–0	Olympiacos
Panathinaikos	3–1	Asteras Athens

== Final ==
20 June 1948
17:30 EET

Panathinaikos	2–1	AEK Athens
Simos 16', 49'	Report (page 1)	Maropoulos 20'

Leoforos Alexandras Stadium, Athens
Attendance: 12,000
Referee: Kostas Tzitzis (Athens)
