= Panagiotis Patakas =

Greek footballer

Personal information
- Full name: Panagiotis Patakas
- Date of birth: 1926 (age 99–100)
- Place of birth: Thessaloniki, Greece
- Place of death: Greece
- Position: Forward

Senior career*
Years	Team	Apps	(Gls)
1944–1948	Megas Alexandros Thessaloniki		
1948–1951	AEK Athens		
1951–1952	Megas Alexandros Thessaloniki		
1952–1955	AEK Athens	8	(3)

International career
1952	Greece Olympic	1	(0)
- * Club domestic league appearances and goals

Panagiotis Patakas (Greek: Παναγιώτης Πατάκας; born 1926) was a Greek professional footballer who played as a forward.

== Club career ==
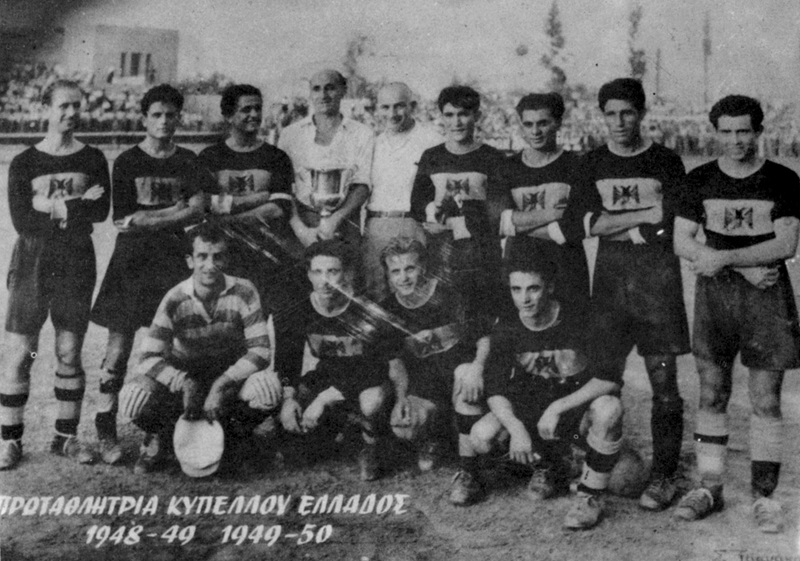
Patakas with AEK in 1950

Patakas started football in 1944 at Megas Alexandros Thessaloniki and in 1948 he was transferred to AEK Athens. With his two goals in the replay match of the final, AEK won the Greek Cup against Panathinaikos, on 3 July 1949. During his spell at AEK he won 2 consecutive Cups and a Athens FCA Championship. On 9 February 1951 he briefly returned to Megas Alexandros, where he played for a year. Afterwards he returned to AEK, where he ended his career in 1955.

== International career ==
Patakas was part of Greece Olympic squad for the 1952 Summer Olympics, but he did not play in any matches. He played once on 25 July 1952 in a 4–2 win over the Great Britain Olympic Team in a friendly match at Hämeenlinna as both teams had recently been eliminated during the preliminary round of the Summer Olympics. He is the only footballer of Megas Alexandros to be named international at men's level.

== Honours ==
AEK Athens

- Greek Cup: 1948–49, 1949–50
- Athens FCA Championship: 1950
