= Antonis Parayios =

Greek footballer (1929–2023)

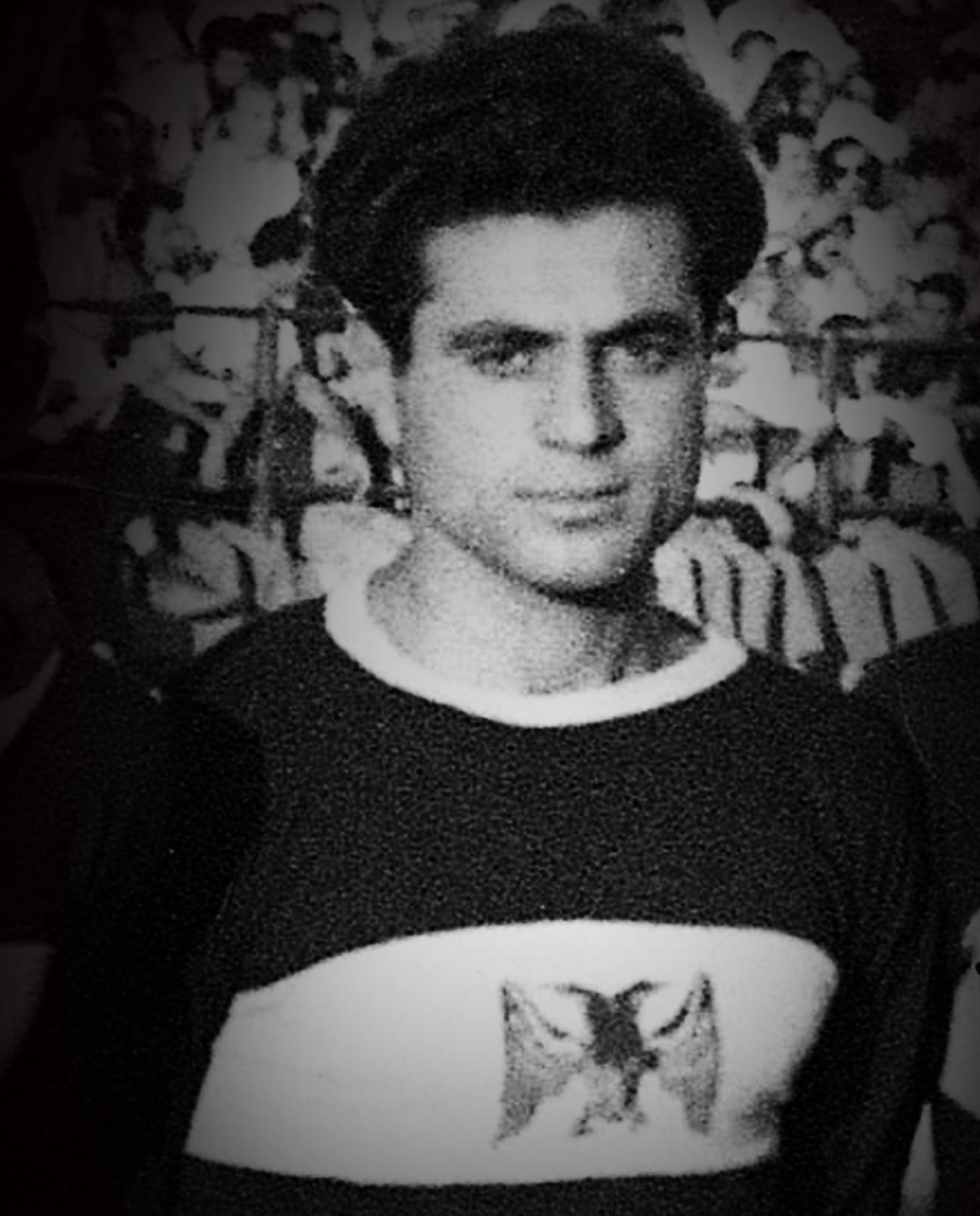
- Antonis Parayios with AEK Athens

Personal information
- Full name: Antonios Parayios
- Date of birth: 15 August 1929
- Place of birth: Menetes, Karpathos, Greece
- Date of death: 28 November 2023 (aged 94)
- Place of death: Athens, Greece
- Position: Defender

Youth career
- 1943–1948: Posidon Glyfada

Senior career*
Years	Team	Apps	(Gls)
1948–1957	AEK Athens	8	(0)
Total		8	(0)

International career
1950–1951	Greece	2	(0)
- * Club domestic league appearances and goals

Antonis Parayios (Greek: Αντώνης Παραγυιός; 15 August 1929 – 28 November 2023) was a Greek professional footballer who played as a defender.

== Club career ==
Parayios started his football career in 1943 at Posidon Glyfada. In 1948, at the age of 19 he was signed by AEK Athens. Under the management of Jack Beby, AEK built a strong team that emerged as a title contender. In his first season he won the Greek Cup, playing in the final 2–1 win at the extra time against Panathinaikos at Leoforos Alexandras Stadium. On 28 May 1950, Parayios won a consecutive Cup against Aris in a 4–0 win at the same stadium. He won a third the cup of his career on 24 June 1956 in a 2–1 victory over Olympiacos. Parayios reached 125 appearances in official matches with the double-headed eagle on his chest: 90 in the Athens Championship, 8 in the Panhellenic Championship and 27 in the Cup. With AEK he won three Cups and an Athens FCA League in 1950. In 1957, when Parayios competed in a friendly match and in a clash with Lukas Aurednik he suffered serious knee injury that forced him to end his career, at the age of only 28.

== International career ==
Parayios became an international with Greece, making two appearances in 1950 and 1951. He made his debut on 13 December 1950 in a 1–0 defeat against France B at Leoforos Alexandras Stadium. His last international appearance was on 14 October 1951 in the friendly match against the same opponent at the Stade Vélodrome, where Greece lost again with the same score.

== Personal life ==
Parayios was married to Kyriaki, whose origin is from Asia Minor. He was one of the 23 veteran football players of AEK who were honored at the opening of the Agia Sophia Stadium. He died on the morning of 28 November 2023, at the age of 94. Prior to his death he was the oldest living veteran footballer of AEK Athens.

== Honours ==
AEK Athens

- Greek Cup: 1948–49, 1949–50, 1955–56
- Athens FCA League: 1950
