= Michalis Papatheodorou =

Greek footballer and a manager (1928–1992)

Personal information
- Full name: Michail Papatheodorou
- Date of birth: 1928
- Place of birth: Peristeri, Greece
- Date of death: 1992 (aged 63–64)
- Place of death: Greece
- Position: Midfielder

Youth career
- 1943–1944: Keravnos Peristeri
- 1944–1947: AEK Athens

Senior career*
| Years | Team | Apps | (Gls) |
| 1944–1956 | AEK Athens | 3 | (0) |
| Total | | 3 | (0) |

International career
| 1950–1951 | Greece | 2 | (0) |

Managerial career
- 1964–1965: Atromitos
- 1965: Proodeftiki
- 1968–1972: Greece military
- 1969–1970: Atromitos
- 1975: Greece military
- * Club domestic league appearances and goals

Michalis Papatheodorou (Greek: Μιχάλης Παπαθεοδώρου; 1928–1992) was a Greek professional footballer who played as a midfielder for AEK Athens and a later manager.

== Club career ==
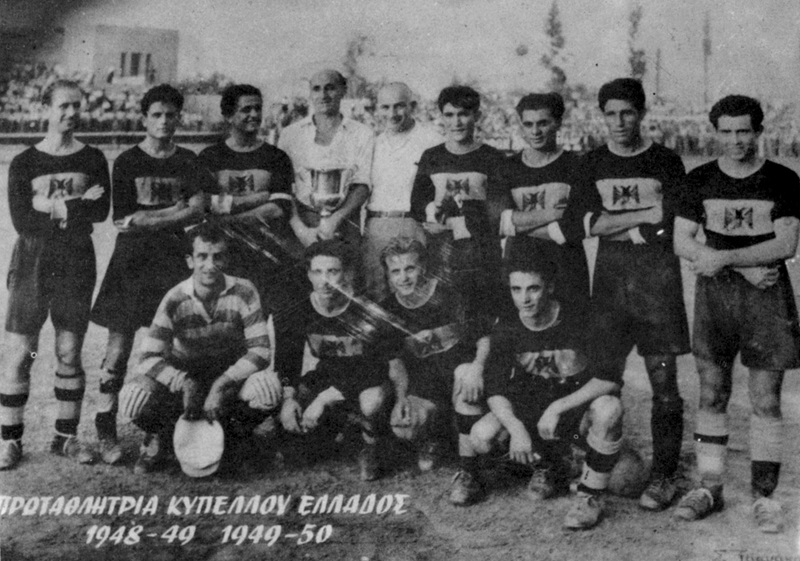
Papatheodorou with AEK in 1950

Papatheodorou started football in 1943 from Keravnos Peristeri and in 1944 he was transferred to AEK Athens, initially competing in the club's academy for three years before being promoted to the men's team. On 3 July 1949, he won the Cup playing in both finals against Panathinaikos at Leoforos Alexandras Stadium. On 28 May 1950, he played in the Cup final against Aris, where AEK prevailed with 4–0 and won their second consecutive title. With AEK he won three cups and a Athens FCA League in 1950. In 1956 a serious injury forced him to end his career at the age of only 28.

== International career ==
Papatheodorou became an international with Greece in 1950 and 1951, earning two caps. He made his debut on 13 December 1950 in the 1–0 defeat against France B at Leoforos Alexandras Stadium. He made his last international appearance on 14 October 1951 in the friendly match against the same opponent at the Stade Vélodrome, where Greece lost again with the same score.

== Managerial career ==
Papatheodorou was the manager of the military team of Greece, winning the 1968 World Military Cup in Baghdad. On 11 December 1969 he was hired at Atromitos.

== Personal life ==
His son, Takis was also a footballer, who played in the reserve team of AEK Athens and made a league appearance with the first team on 26 December 1977, when the professional footballers where on strike.

== Honours ==
=== Player ===
AEK Athens

- Greek Cup: 1948–49, 1949–50, 1955–56
- Athens FCA League: 1950

=== Manager ===
Greece military

- World Military Cup: 1968
