= Jack Beby =

English footballer (1907–1976)

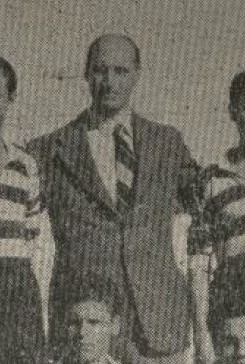
- Jack Beby with AEK Athens in 1949

Personal information
- Full name: John Victor Beby
- Date of birth: 23 August 1907
- Place of birth: Gillingham, Kent, England
- Date of death: June 1976 (aged 68)
- Place of death: Chatham, Kent, England
- Height: 6 ft 2 in (1.88 m)
- Position: Goalkeeper

Senior career*
Years	Team	Apps	(Gls)
- Cuxton
1924–1925	Charlton Athletic	0	(0)
- Grenadier Guards
1929–1930	Gillingham	20	(0)
1930–1932	Leicester City	29	(0)
1932	Ashford Town (Kent)		
1932–1933	Bristol Rovers	24	(0)
1933–1934	Crystal Palace	0	(0)
1934–1936	Darlington	74	(0)
1936	Exeter City	10	(0)
- Ashington
- Vickers Aviation
- Shorts Sports
Total		157	(0)

Managerial career
- 1948–1951: AEK Athens
- * Club domestic league appearances and goals

John Victor Beby (23 August 1907 – 1976) was an English footballer who made 157 appearances in the Football League playing as a goalkeeper for Gillingham, Leicester City, Bristol Rovers, Darlington and Exeter City in the 1920s and 1930s. After his playing career ended, he took up coaching. As well as coaching amateur clubs in England, he was manager of Greek club AEK Athens for three years.

== Personal life ==
Beby was born in Gillingham, Kent, in 1907. As a youngster, he played football for local team Cuxton, and was on the books of Charlton Athletic, before enlisting in the Grenadier Guards. Apart from his military duties, Beby represented his regiment in the shot put, and played cricket, primarily as a bowler, for his regiment and for the Household Brigade.

By early 1931, Beby was married with a child. He died in Chatham, Kent, in 1976 at the age of 68.

== Playing career ==
Beby returned to football with Third Division South club Gillingham in 1929. He made his debut in the Third Division South on 26 December 1929, against Bournemouth & Boscombe Athletic, and the following April, after he had played just 20 league games, First Division club Leicester City paid a "substantial" transfer fee for his services.

Beby began his Leicester career in their reserve team, but impressed when he came into the first team at the start of the new season. Against Birmingham, "it was only the fine work of Beby, the Leicester reserve goalkeeper, that kept them from making a draw, if not, indeed, even forcing a win", and at Manchester City, "it may be conceded that perhaps never again during the season will so many remarkable saves be made in one afternoon as were brought off by this reserve keeper", and when "a merciless assault was sustained on the Leicester goal. With the crowd behind him roaring and swaying like human breakers, one saw Beby leaping up, fisting out, diving down, most amazingly keeping the ball out of the net, most cleverly getting it away when surrounded by blue shirts." Despite such a successful start to his Leicester career, he asked for a transfer after less than a year with the club; according to the Daily Express, "Beby [said] the Leicester air [did] not suit himself, his wife or his child". He remained a Leicester player until the 1932 close season, perhaps because the asking price was too high; in August, in response to an application by the player, the Football League reduced the fee, and Beby left the club.

After a few weeks playing for Kent-based club Ashford Town, Beeby returned to the Football League in October with Bristol Rovers. After one season and 24 league matches, he moved on to Crystal Palace, also of the Third Division South. His only senior game for that club came in the Southern Section Cup. Palace were drawn to play away to Exeter City on 24 January 1934, but were due to face Arsenal in the fourth round of the FA Cup three days later. While the first team had a week's training at Brighton in preparation for their FA Cup tie, Palace fielded their reserve team at Exeter, as was permitted by the competition rules, and lost by the unusual score of eleven goals to six. In March, after less than a year with Palace, Beby joined Third Division North club Darlington. He spent just short of two years at Darlington, playing regular first-team football, before finishing the 1935–36 season, and his Football League career, with Exeter City. His playing career wound down in non-league football with Ashington, Vickers Aviation and Shorts Sports.

== Managerial career ==
From 1948 to 1951, Beby was manager of Greek club AEK Athens. During his tenure he attempted to impose an element of professionalism on the team's approach to its work. He introduced shirt numbering, which had not previously been used in Greece, and set the team up to play in the WM formation, the system then generally used in Britain. He led the team to consecutive victories in the Greek Cup, in 1949 and 1950, before leaving the club suddenly in 1951. He later told the Daily Express that AEK provided him with a furnished house and paid him £31 a week tax free.

In August 1951, he was appointed coach of amateur club Ilford, then playing in the Isthmian League; he was the first professional to hold the position. By the start of the 1954–55 season, he was working as trainer and coach of Faversham Town; it was reported that "although his time at Salters Lane was relatively short, it was noted there were already signs of better football."
