= 1954–55 Greek Football Cup =

1954–55 Greek Cup
Tournament details
- Country: Greece

Final positions
- Champions: Panathinaikos (3rd title)
- Runners-up: PAOK

The 1954–55 Greek Football Cup was the 13th edition of the Greek Football Cup. The competition culminated with the Greek Cup final, held at Leoforos Alexandras Stadium, on 12 June 1955. The match was contested by Panathinaikos and PAOK, with Panathinaikos winning by 2–0.

== Calendar ==
From Round of 32 onwards:

Round	Date(s)	Fixtures	Clubs	New entries
Round of 32	27 February 1955	16	32 → 16	none
Round of 16	10, 27 April 1955	10	16 → 8	8
Quarter-finals		4	8 → 4	none
Semi-finals		2	4 → 2	none
Final	12 June 1955	1	2 → 1	none

== Knockout phase ==
In the knockout phase, teams play against each other over a single match. If the match ends up as a draw, extra time will be played and if the match remains a draw a replay match is set at the home of the guest team which the extra time rule stands as well. If a winner doesn't occur after the replay match the winner emerges by a flip of a coin.
The mechanism of the draws for each round is as follows:

- In the draw for the round of 16, the eight top teams of each association are seeded and the eight clubs that passed the qualification round are unseeded.
  The seeded teams are drawn against the unseeded teams.
- In the draws for the quarter-finals onwards, there are no seedings, and teams from the same group can be drawn against each other.

== Bracket ==
Round of 32
OFI	1
Ergotelis	0
Panathinaikos	1
Asteras Athens	0
Aris	8
PO Xirokrini	2
Niki Volos	2
Iraklis	1
Apollon Athens	2
Spartiatikos	1
Atromitos Ioannina	1	0
Egaleo	1	4
Panachaiki	1
Olympiacos Patras	4
Olympiacos	5
Atromitos Piraeus	1
Panionios	4
Pallevadiaki	0
Esperos Kallitheas	0
Ethnikos Piraeus (w/o)	2
PAOK	2
Makedonikos	0
Iraklis Kavala	2
Elpida Drama	3
Doxa Drama	3
Aspida Xanthi	0
Makedonikos Kozani	1
Apollon Kalamarias	2
Olympiacos Volos	3
Pagasitikos Volos	2
Aris Korinthos	2
AEK Athens	4

Round of 16
OFI	1
Panathinaikos	2
Aris	2
Niki Volos	1
Apollon Athens	3
Egaleo	1
Olympiacos Patras	0
Olympiacos	1
Panionios	2
Ethnikos Piraeus	0
PAOK (a.e.t.)	3
Elpida Drama	2
Doxa Drama	1	2
Apollon Kalamarias	1	1
Olympiacos Volos	1	1
AEK Athens	1	0

Quarter-finals
Panathinaikos	1
Aris	0
Apollon Athens	3
Olympiacos	1
Panionios	2
PAOK	4
Doxa Drama	5
Olympiacos Volos	3

Semi-finals
Panathinaikos	2
Apollon Athens	1
PAOK	1
Doxa Drama	0

Final
Panathinaikos	2
PAOK	0

== Round of 32 ==
Team 1	Score/Agg.	Team 2	Match	Replay
Doxa Drama	3–0	Aspida Xanthi		
Aris Korinthos	2–4	AEK Athens		
Panachaiki	1–4	Olympiacos Patras		
Aris	8–2	PO Xirokrini		
Niki Volos	2–1	Iraklis		
Atromitos Ioannina	1–5	Egaleo	1–1 (a.e.t.)	0–4
Esperos Kallitheas	0–2 (w/o)	Ethnikos Piraeus		
Apollon Athens	2–1	Spartiatikos		
Panionios	4–0	Pallevadiaki		
OFI	1–0	Ergotelis		
PAOK	2–0	Makedonikos		
Iraklis Kavala	2–3	Elpida Drama		
Olympiacos Volos	3–2	Pagasitikos Volos		
Panathinaikos	1–0	Asteras Athens		
Makedonikos Kozani	1–2	Apollon Kalamarias		
Olympiacos	5–1	Atromitos Piraeus		

== Round of 16 ==
Team 1	Score/Agg.	Team 2	Match	Replay
Panionios	2–0	Ethnikos Piraeus		
Apollon Athens	3–1	Egaleo		
Olympiacos Volos	2–1	AEK Athens	1–1 (a.e.t.)	1–0
OFI	1–2	Panathinaikos		
Olympiacos Patras	0–1^{*}	Olympiacos		
PAOK	3–2 (a.e.t.)	Elpida Drama		
Doxa Drama	3–2	Apollon Kalamarias	1–1	2–1
Aris	2–1	Niki Volos		

^{*} Match suspended at 69th minute. Olympiacos scored and Olympiacos Patras players questioned goal's validity and left from the pitch.

== Quarter-finals ==
Team 1	Score	Team 2
Panionios	2–4	PAOK
Olympiacos Volos	3–5 (a.e.t.)	Doxa Drama
Panathinaikos	1–0	Aris
Apollon Athens	3–1	Olympiacos

== Semi-finals ==
Team 1	Score	Team 2
Panathinaikos	2–1	Apollon Athens
PAOK	1–0	Doxa Drama

== Final ==
12 June 1955
17:00 EET

Panathinaikos	2–0	PAOK
Kourtzidis 24'; Panakis 31'	Report

Leoforos Alexandras Stadium, Ampelokipoi
Attendance: 6,729
Referee: Vasilis Diamandopoulos (Athens)
