= 1940–41 Greek Football Cup =

1940–41 Greek Cup
Tournament details
- Country: Greece
- Teams: 79

Final positions
- Champions: None
- Runners-up: None

Tournament statistics
- Matches played: 18
- Goals scored: 94 (5.22 per match)

The 1940–41 Greek Football Cup was never completed, due to the invasion of Greece by Italy. Only the first round was carried out.

== First round ==
Team 1	Score/Agg.	Team 2	Match	Replay
Athens Football Clubs Association
Olympiada	3–2	Atlas Thymarakia		
AO Nea Ionia	4–2 (a.e.t.)	Ierapoli		
A.O. Kifisia	4–1	Panerythraikos		
Mikrasiatiki Athens	3–5	Ellinorosikos		
Olympiacos Athens	2–0	Attikos		
Piraeus Football Clubs Association
Argonaftis Piraeus	1–5	Neapoli Piraeus		
Ifestos Kokkinia	1–2	Philathloi		
Panelefsiniakos	2–0 (w/o)	Faliriki Enosis		
Thessaly Football Clubs Association
Elpida Drama	5–1	Aris Drama		
Anagennisi Karditsa		PO Trikala		
Iraklis Larissa	3–0	Iraklis Volos		
Kentavros Volos	4–1	Odysseas Volos		
Niki Volos	1–2	Keravnos Volos		
Macedonia Football Clubs Association
Apollon Kalamarias	3–3	Ethnikos Thessaloniki		
Apollon Serres	2–4	Megas Alexandros		
Olympiacos Naousa		Thermaikos		
Eastern Macedonia/Thrace Football Clubs Association
AE Komotini		AE Alexandroupoli		
Doxa Drama	10–0	Enosis Armenion Kavala		
Elpida Drama	5–0	Aris Drama		
Aspida Xanthi		Orfeas Xanthi		
Patras Football Clubs Association
Ethnikos Patra	Postponed	Iraklis Patra		
Panegialios	3–1	Patreus		
Achileas Patra	6–1	Thyella Patras		
Panetolikos	2–0 (w/o)	Asteras Patra		
Ethnikos Pyrgos	2–0 (w/o)	Apollon Patras		
