= Kamenikia (Serres, Greece) =

Neighborhood of Serres, Greece

Kamenikia (Greek: Καμενίκια, Bulgarian: Каменица - Kamenitsa) is the name of a neighborhood in the city of Serres, Greece today.

During the antiquity in the place of Kamenikia was flourishing a settlement depended administratively on the nearby ancient city of Serres. The settlement was located on the hill named "Besik-tepe" on the eastern bank of the stream of St. Barbara (known as "Tsai"), in which there was a little below a bridge (rather wooden). From this bridge was passing a Roman road (branch of via Egnatia) connecting the ancient city of Serres with Skotoussa and Heraclea Sintica.

In the Byzantine years there was in the same place the monastery of Agios Nikolaos (the so-called "Kamenikaias") (Greek: Μονή Αγίου Νικολάου Καμενικαίας), which was property of the monastery of Hilandar of Mount Athos.

The neighborhood is well known today because in its church of Evangelistria was killed (14 July 1907) the hero of Macedonian struggle Kapetan Mitrousis, also known as Dimitrios Gogolakis, born in the nearby village of Homondos (Kato Mitrousi today).
