= Pavlos Emmanouilidis =

Greek footballer

Personal information
- Full name: Pavlakis Emmanouilidis
- Date of birth: 15 October 1929
- Place of birth: Thiseio, Athens, Greece
- Positions: Right midfielder; striker

Youth career
- –1947: AEK Athens

Senior career*
Years	Team	Apps	(Gls)
1947–1961	AEK Athens	202	(43)
1961–1965	Panachaiki		

International career
1950–1958	Greece	12	(3)
1952	Greece Olympic	1	(1)

Managerial career
- 1970: Panargiakos
- 1976–1977: Paniliakos
- * Club domestic league appearances and goals

Pavlos "Lakis" Emmanouilidis (Greek: Παύλος "Λάκης" Εμμανουηλίδης; born 15 October 1929) is a Greek former professional footballer who played as forward, mostly for AEK Athens. He was an agile right midfielder who wrote his own story in AEK Athens and the Greek stadiums.

== Club career ==
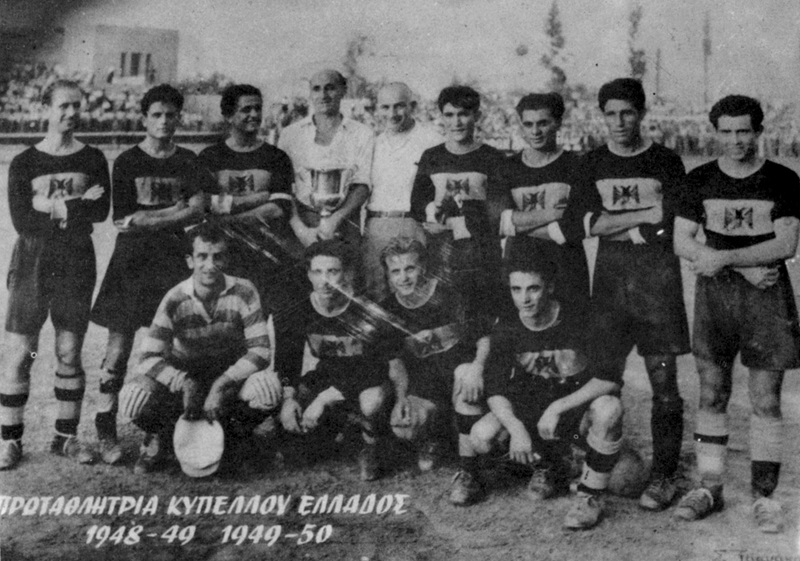
Emmanouilidis with AEK in 1950

Emmanouilidis was born in 1929 at Thiseio and grew up in Patissia. There, he was scouted by Georgios Daispangos and joined the academy of AEK Athens, where he was promoted to the senior team in 1947.

He was considered among the fastest players of his generation, while he also was capable of powerful shots. He started his career as a center-forward, but eventually was converted to a right midfielder. Simple and spontaneous as a person, with the courage of express opinion, he did not accept to be wronged and was quite impulsive as a result to be punished throughout his career, the most characteristic of which was a four-year exclusion from the national team. An irreplaceable player at AEK, despite the harsh competition for a place in the starting lineup, he presented stable performances and used to upset the opposing defenses, while he could shoot well with both feet. In 1958 he was seriously injured, underwent surgery and was absent from action for a long time. When he returned, he played in some matches. During his spell at AEK he won three Cups. In 1961 Emmanouilidis moved to Panachaiki, where he played for four seasons, before his retirement in 1965.

== International career ==
Emmanouilidis was called up to the national team for the first time in 1950 and played a total of 12 times and scored 3 goals until 1958. He made his debut on 13 December 1950 in the home match against the France B, in the Mediterranean Cup, under the instructions of Kostas Negrepontis. He also competed in the men's tournament at the 1952 Summer Olympics in Helsinki. He scored the only goal for Greece in the tournament, in a 2–1 loss against Denmark at Tampere.

== Managerial career ==
On 9 August 1976 Emmanouilidis was hired as the manager of Paniliakos.

== Personal life ==
During his time as a footballer, Emmanouilidis also worked as an employee of PPC. Since his retirement he lives away from the public eye and has a son named Giannis, known from playing bouzouki in the band "Opisthodromiki Kompania".

== Honours ==
AEK Athens

- Greek Cup: 1948–49, 1949–50, 1955–56
- Athens FCA Championship: 1950
