= Youlielmos Arvanitis =

Greek footballer and manager (1920–1987)

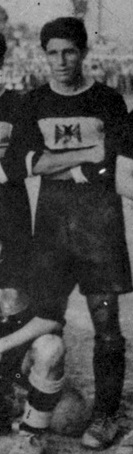
- Youlielmos Arvanitis in 1950

Personal information
- Full name: Youlielmos Arvanitis
- Date of birth: 1920
- Place of birth: Thessaloniki, Greece
- Date of death: 1987 (aged 66–67)
- Positions: Midfielder; defender

Youth career
- 1936–1938: Ethnikos Kamaras

Senior career*
Years	Team	Apps	(Gls)
1938–1946	PAOK		
1946–1954	AEK Athens	11	(0)

International career
1952	Greece Military		
1948–1952	Greece	5	(0)
1952	Greece Olympic	1	(0)

Managerial career
- 1954–1958: Atromitos
- 1963: Panegialios
- 1966: Atromitos
- 1968: Ethnikos Asteras
- 1973–1974: Ionikos
- 1974–1975: Pannafpliakos
- * Club domestic league appearances and goals

Youlielmos Arvanitis (Greek: Γουλιέλμος Αρβανίτης; 1920 – 1987), also known as "Youlios" (Greek: "Γούλιος") was a Greek footballer who played as a midfielder and a manager.

== Club career ==
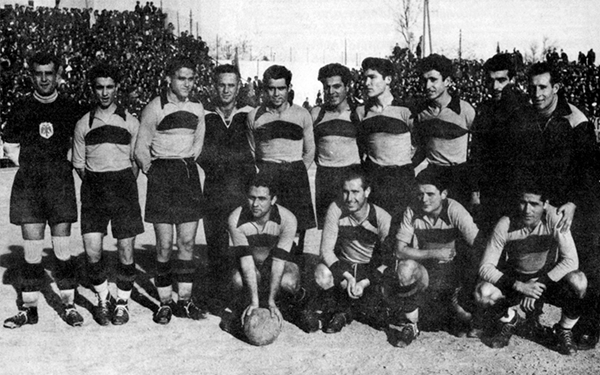
Arvanitis with AEK in 1949

Arvanitis started football at Ethnikos Kamaras in 1936. 2 years later moved to PAOK, where he remained after the end of World War II. In 1946 he transferred to AEK Athens. The fans called him "Youlios", a nickname that the press of the time often used in place of his first name. The original position of Arvanitis was the left back, to be converted to that of central midfielder or centre-half when the role acquired more defensive duties in the football of the time and before he definitively became a centre-back. Due to his timely placements against opposing forwards and his education, he was also known as "the Wise One". He played for 8 years, before retiring as a footballer in 1954. Arvanitis participated in 5 finals of the Greek Cup. With PAOK in 1939 in the 1–2 defeat by AEK and with the latter in 1948, 1949, 1950 and 1953. He won the trophy twice and scored the second goal in a 4–0 win over Aris in 1950.

== International career ==
Arvanitis was called to play for Greece, with only 5 appearances, being in that generation of players who lost the opportunity for more because of World War II. He made his debut on 23 April 1948 in Greece's first post-war match after ten years, a 1–3 loss to Turkey at Leoforos Alexandras Stadium and 3.5 years later, he played as the captain in a friendly match against France B at Marseille, in a 0–1 defeat.

He was selected in the squad for the 1952 Olympic Games, where he played in a 1–2 defeat by Denmark in Tampere that was also his last international appearance. He also played with the military team and won the World Military Cup in 1952.

== After football ==
Arvanitis was one of the few athletes of the first post-war period with a high educational level. After his retirement as a football player, he enacted with coaching. He worked in several clubs, including Atromitos, Ionikos and Pannafpliakos.

== Persomal life ==
Arvanitis died in 1987. On 19 December 2022 his son, Konstantinos donated his golden medal from the 1949 Greek Cup final to the History Museum of AEK Athens.

== Honours ==
AEK Athens

- Greek Cup: 1948–49, 1949–50
- Athens FCA Championship: 1947, 1950

Greece military

- World Military Cup: 1952
