= 1940 Greek Football Cup final =

1940 Greek Cup final
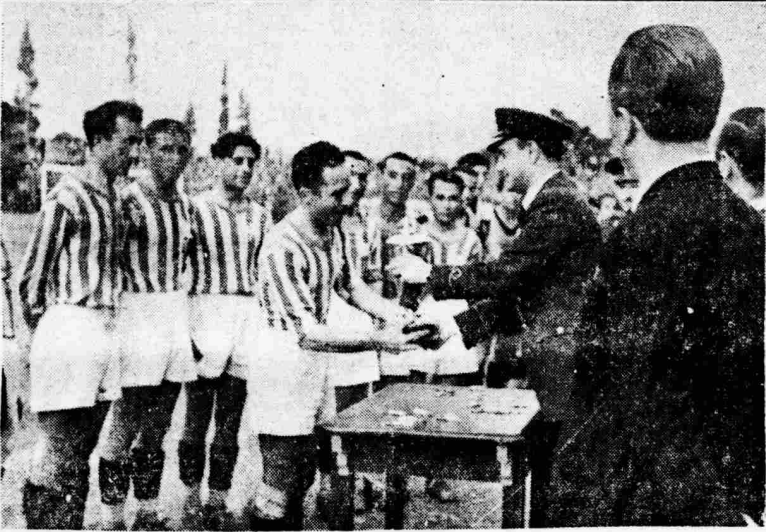
- Τhe awarding of the Cup to Panathinaikos
- Event: 1939–40 Greek Football Cup
Panathinaikos	Aris
3	1
- Date: 2 June 1940
- Venue: Leoforos Alexandras Stadium, Ampelokipoi, Athens
- Referee: Vasilis Diamantopoulos (Athens)

The 1940 Greek Cup final was the 4th final of the Greek Cup. The match took place on 2 June 1940 at Leoforos Alexandras Stadium. The contesting teams were Panathinaikos and Aris. It was Panathinaikos' first ever Greek Cup final in their 32 years of existence and Aris' third Greek Cup final in their 26-year history.

== Venue ==
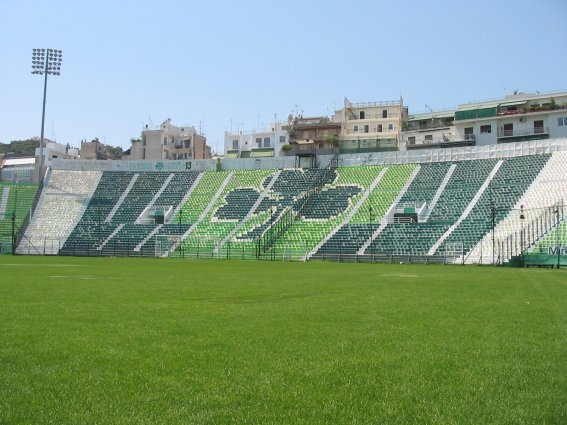
Leoforos Alexandras Stadium.

This was the third Greek Cup final held at Leoforos Alexandras Stadium, after the 1932 and 1939 finals. (Leoforos also hosted the replay match of the 1933 final between Ethnikos Piraeus and Aris).

Leoforos Alexandras Stadium was built in 1922. The stadium is used as a venue for Panathinaikos and Greece. Its current capacity is 30,000.

== Background ==
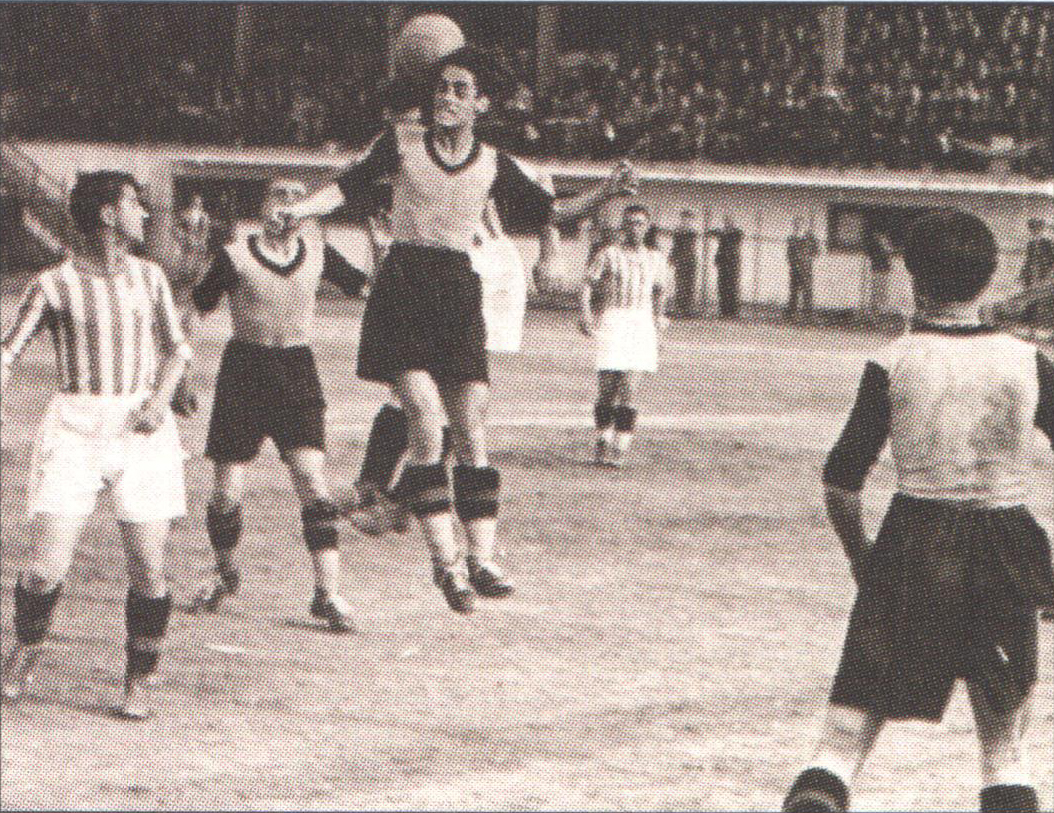
A highlight of the match

Panathinaikos had never competed in a Cup final.

Aris had reached the Greek Cup final two times. The last time that had played in a final was in 1933, where they had lost to Ethnikos Piraeus by 2–1 in a replay match, after the 2–2 of the initial match.

The two teams had never met each other in a Cup final.

== Route to the final ==
Panathinaikos				Round	Aris			
Opponent	Agg.	1st leg	2nd leg		Opponent	Agg.	1st leg	2nd leg
Iraklis Serres	6–1 (H)			Round of 16	Doxa Drama	5–3	1–1 (a.e.t.) (A)	4–2 (H)
Apollon Athens	5–2	1–1 (a.e.t.) (H)	4–1 (A)	Quarter-finals	PAOK	3–2	1–1 (a.e.t.) (A)	2–1 (H)
Ethnikos Piraeus	1–0 (H)			Semi-finals	AEK Athens	5–2	2–2 (a.e.t.) (H)	3–0 (H)

== Match ==
=== Details ===
2 June 1940
17:00 EET

Panathinaikos	3–1	Aris
Baltasis 9' (pen.); Triantafyllis 10'; Migiakis 13'	Report	Chatzinikolaou 61'

Leoforos Alexandras Stadium, Athens
Referee: Vasilis Diamantopoulos (Athens)

GK	(Greece) Vasilis Chantzos
DF	(Greece) Spyros Syrkos
DF	(Greece) Anastasios Kritikos
MF	(Greece) Takis Strouboulis
MF	(Greece) Vasilis Kaberos
MF	(Greece) Vasilis Svolopoulos
FW	(Greece) Antonis Migiakis (c)
FW	(Greece) Dimitris Baltasis
FW	(Greece) Grigoris Symeonidis
FW	(Greece) Takis Triantafyllis
FW	(Greece) Olysseas Tsoutsos
Manager:
(Greece) Dimitris Dimitriadis

GK	(Greece) Kostas Gotsis
DF	(Greece) Achileas Magras
DF	(Greece) Vahakn Abrahamyan
MF	(Greece) Dimitris Stavrakbeis
MF	(Greece) Alekos Siotis
MF	(Greece) Kostas Nikolaidis
FW	(Greece) Dimosthenis Chatzinikolaou
FW	(Greece) Miltiadis Sidiropoulos
FW	(Greece) Kleanthis Vikelidis
FW	(Greece) Nikos Rammos
FW	(Greece) Michalis Koloniaris
Manager:
(Greece) Kostas Vikelidis

Assistant referees:
Sakoulas
Vasilis Dimopoulos

Match rules

- 90 minutes
- 30 minutes of extra time if necessary
- Replay match if scores still level

== See also ==
- 1939–40 Greek Football Cup
