= 1952–53 Greek Football Cup =

1952–53 Greek Cup
Tournament details
- Country: Greece

Final positions
- Champions: Olympiacos (4th title)
- Runners-up: AEK Athens

The 1952–53 Greek Football Cup was the 11th edition of the Greek Football Cup. The competition culminated with the Greek Cup final, held at Leoforos Alexandras Stadium, on 17 May 1953. The match was contested by Olympiacos and AEK Athens, with Olympiacos winning by 3–2.

== Calendar ==
From Last qualifying round onwards:

Round	Date(s)	Fixtures	Clubs	New entries
Last qualifying round	25 January 1953		→ 16	
Round of 16	8 February 1953	8	16 → 8	8
Quarter-finals	29 March 1953	4	8 → 4	none
Semi-finals	3 May 1953	2	4 → 2	none
Final	17 May 1953	1	2 → 1	none

== Last qualifying round ==
Team 1	Score	Team 2
AE Chalandri	1–0	Asteras Athens
Fostiras	2–0 (a.e.t.)	Esperos Kallitheas
Apollon Kalamarias	4–0	PAOK

== Knockout phase ==
In the knockout phase, teams play against each other over a single match. If the match ends up as a draw, extra time will be played and if the match remains a draw a replay match is set at the home of the guest team which the extra time rule stands as well. If a winner doesn't occur after the replay match the winner emerges by a flip of a coin.
The mechanism of the draws for each round is as follows:

- In the draw for the round of 16, the eight top teams of each association are seeded and the eight clubs that passed the qualification round are unseeded.
  The seeded teams are drawn against the unseeded teams.
- In the draws for the quarter-finals onwards, there are no seedings, and teams from the same group can be drawn against each other.

== Bracket ==
Round of 16
OFI	0
Panathinaikos	9
Orfeas Xanthi	0
Makedonikos	3
Fostiras	2
Ethnikos Piraeus	0
Olympiacos	4
AE Chalandri	1
Aris	5
Iraklis	1
AEK Athens	4
Panelefsiniakos	1
Thyella Patras	1
Panionios	2
Olympiacos Volos	0
Apollon Kalamarias	1

Quarter-finals
Panathinaikos	3
Makedonikos	0
Fostiras	1
Olympiacos	3
Aris	0
AEK Athens	1
Panionios	2
Apollon Kalamarias	1

Semi-finals
Panathinaikos	1
Olympiacos	2
AEK Athens	2
Panionios	1

Final
Olympiacos	3
AEK Athens	2

== Round of 16 ==
Team 1	Score	Team 2
OFI	0–9	Panathinaikos
Olympiacos Volos	0–1	Apollon Kalamarias
Olympiacos	4–1	AE Chalandri
Fostiras	2–0	Ethnikos Piraeus
Thyella Patras	1–2	Panionios
AEK Athens	4–1	Panelefsiniakos
Orfeas Xanthi	0–3	Makedonikos
Aris	5–1	Iraklis

== Quarter-finals ==
Team 1	Score	Team 2
Panathinaikos	3–0	Makedonikos
Aris	0–1	AEK Athens
Panionios	2–1	Apollon Kalamarias
Fostiras	1–3	Olympiacos

== Semi-finals ==
Team 1	Score	Team 2
Panathinaikos	1–2	Olympiacos
AEK Athens	2–1	Panionios

== Final ==
17 May 1953
17:00 EET

Olympiacos	3–2	AEK Athens
Kansos 21', 37'; Darivas 79'	Report	Serafidis 83'; Kanakis 88'

Leoforos Alexandras Stadium, Ampelokipoi
Attendance: 25,000
Referee: Manolis Zapardas (Piraeus)
