= Orchomenos F.C. =

A.E. Orchomenos
- Full name: Athlitiki Enosi Orchomenou
- Founded: 1945; 81 years ago
- Ground: Municipal Stadium of Orchomenos
- Capacity: 2,000
- League: Boeotia FCA

A.E. Orchomenos (Greek: Α.Ε. Ορχομενού) is a Greek football club, based on Orchomenos, Beotia. It was founded in 1945.

The club spent five seasons in the Greek Second Division between 1965 and 1972.
