= G.S. Megas Alexandros Thessaloniki =

- Full name: Gymnastikos Syllogos Megas Alexandros (Gymnastic Club Alexander the Great)
- Nicknames: Μέγας (The big); Καμινίκια (Kaminikia)
- Founded: 1923; 103 years ago
- Ground: Megas Alexandros Ground
- Capacity: 1,000
- Owner: Vasilios Gountziouris
- Manager: Ilias Galanopoulos
- League: Macedonia FCA Second Division
- 2025–26: Macedonia FCA Third Division (Group 3), 1st (promoted)
- Website: Official website
Home colours

G.S. Megas Alexandros Thessaloniki (Greek: Γ.Σ. Μέγας Αλέξανδρος) is a multi-sport club that is located in the district of Dépôt, in the city of Thessaloniki, Greece. The club's full name is Gymnastikos Syllogos Megas Alexandros (Γυμναστικός Σύλλογος Μέγας Αλέξανδρος). It retains sporting departments in basketball, fencing, football, volleyball, and olympic weightlifting. The club's colours are red and black, and its emblem is an image of Alexander the Great.

== History ==
The multi-sport club of G.S. Megas Alexandros Thessaloniki was founded in 1923. The club's men's football team participated in the Panhellenic Championships of 1932–33, 1933–34, and 1934–35. In those seasons, it failed to win any titles.The basketball and volleyball divisions of the club became its primary focuses in the ensuing decades, particularly their respective sports academies.
