= 1949–50 Greek Football Cup =

1949–50 Greek Cup
Tournament details
- Country: Greece
- Teams: 157

Final positions
- Champions: AEK Athens (4th title)
- Runners-up: Aris

Tournament statistics
- Matches played: 161
- Goals scored: 502 (3.12 per match)

The 1949–50 Greek Football Cup was the eighth edition of the Greek Football Cup. The competition culminated with the Greek Cup final, held at Leoforos Alexandras Stadium, Athens on 28 May 1950. The match was contested by AEK Athens and Aris, with AEK Athens winning by 4–0.

== Calendar ==
Round	Date(s)	Fixtures	Clubs	New entries
First Round	6, 16, 23, 26, 30 October, 11 November 1949	68	157 → 89	134
Second Round	30, 31 October, 2, 9, 13 November 1949	28	89 → 64	12
Third Round	13, 20, 23, 24, 27 November, 7 December 1949	16	64 → 49	2
Fourth Round	20, 22, 27–29 November, 18 December 1949	15	49 → 32	1
Fifth Round	27 November, 4, 14, 15, 18 December 1949 & 8 January 1950	11	32 → 21	none
Sixth Round	25 December 1949 & 1, 6, 8 January 1950	5	21 → 16	none
Round of 16	29 January, 8 March 1950	8	16 → 8	8
Quarter-finals	19, 29 March 1950	6	8 → 4	none
Semi-finals	30 April, 11 May 1950	3	4 → 2	none
Final	28 May 1950	1	2 → 1	none

== Qualification round ==
=== First round ===
Team 1	Score/Agg.	Team 2	Match	Replay
Central Greece/Islands Football Clubs Association
Ilisiakos	1–0	AO Zografou		
Asteras Athens	2–1	AE Ampelokipoi		
Ionikos Nea Filadelfeia	1–4	Olympias Athens		
AE Nea Ionia	6–1	Kronos		
AEK Athens	12–0	Niki Ampelokipoi		
Apollon Athens	8–0	Yperochi		
Eleftheroupoli	4–2	Athinaikos		
Kallithaikos	2–3	Armeniki		
Iraklis Kallithea	4–3	Pantzitzifiakos		
Agios Dimitrios	2–0	Niki Plaka		
AE Nea Elvetia	2–3	AE Pangrati		
Ethnikos Asteras	1–2	Daphni Athens		
Panerythraikos	5–1	Doxa Athens		
Aris Athens	2–1	Panexarchiakos		
Attikos	2–0	Ermis Piraeus		
Argonaftis Piraeus	2–1	Archimidis Piraeus		
Atromitos Piraeus	2–1 (a.e.t.)	APO P. Kokkinia		
AE Nikaia	0–1	AE Karava		
Aris Piraeus	5–3	Doxa Piraeus		
Victoria	4–5	Filathloi Piraeus	3–3 (a.e.t.)	1–2^{1}
A.O. Kifisia	0–1	Proodos Patisia		
AE Chalandri	2–0	PO Psichiko		
Keramikos	1–6	Sparta		
Aias Salamina	1–2	Ampelakiakos		
Panelefsiniakos	8–1	Aiolikos Tzitzifies		
Proodeftiki	2–1	Neapolis		
Hellas Syros	0–2	Esperos Kallitheas		
Asteras Chios	?	Mikrasiatiki Chios		
Lelapa Chios	?	Aetos Chios		
Diagoras	?	Dorieus^{2}		
Patras/Western Greece Football Clubs Association
Apollon Patras	3–2	AEK Patras		
Asteras Patras	1–0	Iraklis Patras		
Olympiakos Patras	4–1	Aetos Rio		
Achaiki	5–3	Patreus		
Proodeftiki Patras	2–1	Armeniki Patras		
Achilleus Patras	3–1	Aetos Patras		
Panachaiki	2–1^{3}	Aris Patras		
Lefkos Asteras Amaliadas	2–0 (w/o)^{4}	AEK Pyrgos		
Panetolikos	0–2	Thyella Patras		
Proskopoi Kalamatas	2–3	Prasina Poulia		
Apollon Kalamata	4–1	AEK Kalamata		
Crete Football Clubs Association
OFI	2–3	Iraklis Heraklion		
EGOH	2–3	Ermis Heraklion		
Keravnos Rethymno	1–0	Asteras Rethymno		
Ergotelis	6–0	Olympiacos Heraklion		
Thessaly Football Clubs Association
Niki Volos	2–1	Pagasitikos Volos		
Olympiacos Volos	6–1	Kentavros Volos		
Toxotis Larissa	?	Larisaikos		
Achilleus Trikala	3–2	POA Karditsa		
Iraklis Larissa	5–0	Aris Larissa		
Olympiacos Chalkida	?	AEK Chalkida		
Aris Thiva	4–1	Ionikos Thiva		
Pallevadiaki	2–1	Panthivaikos		
Orchomenos	?	Propontis Chalkida		
Macedonia Football Clubs Association
Meliteus	1–2	PAE Dioikitirio		
Apollon Kalamarias	1–0	AE Ampelokipoi Thessaloniki		
Megas Alexandros	3–2	Thermaikos		
PO Xirokrini	1–2	Akrites Sykies		
Iraklis	6–0	MENT		
Eastern Macedonia Football Clubs Association
Vyron Kavala	?	Aris Zygos		
AE Kavala	?	Iraklis Kavala		
Orfeas Eleftheroupoli	?	Filippoi Kavala		
Elpida Drama	?	Vyron Drama		
Doxa Drama	?	Aris Drama		
Iraklis Serres	?	Apollon Serres		
Aspida Xanthi	?	Orfeas Xanthi		
Orfeas Komotini	?	Ethnikos Alexandroupoli		

^{1} Victoria withdrew at the 33rd minute. That remained as the final score.

^{2} Dorieus qualified for the next phase, where he would face a team from Central Greece, but resigned due to inability to cover the travel expenses of the Athenian team.

^{3} Aris Patras withdrew at the 70th minute. That remained as the final score.

^{4}AEK Pyrgos withdrew at the 54th minute while the score was 1–1. Awarded to Lefkos Asteras Amaliadas.

=== Second round ===
Team 1	Score/Agg.	Team 2	Match	Replay
Central Greece/Islands Football Clubs Association
Asteras Athens	0–2	Ilisiakos		
Aris Piraeus	1–0	AE Karava		
Panelefsiniakos	2–0	Eleftheroupoli		
Armeniki	3–3^{5}	Iraklis Kallithea	2–2 (a.e.t.)	1–1 (a.e.t.)
AE Pangrati	4–3	AE Chalandri	2–2 (a.e.t.)	2–1 (a.e.t.)
Olympias Athens	0–1	Attikos		
Agios Dimitrios	3–2	Argonaftis Piraeus		
Ampelakiakos	2–6	Proodeftiki		
Aris Athens	2–0	Proodos Patisia		
Atromitos Piraeus	1–0 (a.e.t.)	Panerythraikos		
Daphni Athens	6–0	Filathloi Piraeus		
AEK Athens	9–1	Sparta		
Apollon Athens	1–0	AE Nea Ionia		
Achilleus Corinth	2–1	Olympiacos Loutraki	0–0 (a.e.t.)	2–1
Pelops Kiatou	9–3	Aris Corinth		
Iraklis Xilokastro	2–1	Aris Vochaikos		
Panargiakos	?	Olympiacos Corinth		
Aetos Chios	?	Mikrasiatiki Chios		
Pallesviakos	?	Achilleus Mitilini		
Crete Football Clubs Association
Atromitos Rethymno	?	Keravnos Rethymno		
Macedonia Football Clubs Association
Apollon Kalamarias	4–2	Akrites Sykies		
Megas Alexandros	4–1	PAE Dioikitirio		
Eastern Macedonia Football Clubs Association
Filippoi Kavala	?	Vyron Kavala		
Elpida Drama	?	AE Kavala		
Iraklis Serres	?	Ethnikos Sidirokastro		

^{5} Iraklis Kallithea withdrew after the second draw.

=== Third round ===
Team 1	Score/Agg.	Team 2	Match	Replay
Central Greece/Islands Football Clubs Association
Agios Dimitrios	3–0	Armeniki		
Ilisiakos	0–1	AE Pangrati		
Proodeftiki	3–0	Daphni Athens		
Panelefsiniakos	2–1	Attikos		
Atromitos Piraeus	2–0 (a.e.t.)	Aris Piraeus		
Patras/Western Greece Football Clubs Association
Aris Kerkyra	4–3	Achilleus Patras		
Achaiki	3–0	Proodeftiki Patras		
Lefkos Asteras Amaliadas	0–4	Panachaiki		
Thyella Patras	2–1 (a.e.t.)	Apollon Patras		
Olympiakos Patras	4–2	Asteras Patras	1–1 (a.e.t.)	3–1
Apollon Kalamata	3–3^{6}	Prasina Poulia		
Thessaly Football Clubs Association
Iraklis Larissa	3–2	Toxotis Larissa		
Niki Volos	1–2	Olympiacos Volos		
Macedonia Football Clubs Association
Apollon Kalamarias	1–0	Megas Alexandros		
Olympiacos Naousa	1–5	Iraklis		

^{6} Prasina Poulia withdrew at the 70th minute.

=== Fourth round ===
Team 1	Score	Team 2
Central Greece/Islands Football Clubs Association
Esperos Kallitheas	2–4	Proodeftiki
Panelefsiniakos	1–0	Aris Athens
Apollon Athens	7–1	Agios Dimitrios
Aris Thiva	0–2 (w/o)	AE Pangrati
Achilleus Corinth	2–0	Panargiakos
Pelops Kiatou	5–2	Iraklis Xilokastro
Patras/Western Greece Football Clubs Association
Thyella Patras	2–0	Aris Kerkyra
Crete Football Clubs Association
Iraklis Heraklion	1–0	Ermis Heraklion
Ergotelis	1–0	Keravnos Rethymno
Thessaly Football Clubs Association
Iraklis Larissa	2–0	Achilleus Trikala
Olympiacos Chalkida	1–2	Enosis Chalkida
Orchomenos	Sus.^{7}	Pallevadiaki
Macedonia Football Clubs Association
Iraklis	1–0	Apollon Kalamarias
Eastern Macedonia Football Clubs Association
Iraklis Serres	0–7	Doxa Drama
Filippoi Kavala	0–2 (w/o)^{8}	Elpida Drama
Aspida Xanthi	2–1	Orfeas Komotini

^{7} Suspended due to incidents. Both teams were zeroed.

^{8} Filippoi Kavala won 3–2 but were zeroed due to illeagal usage of a football player.

=== Fifth round ===
Team 1	Score/Agg.	Team 2	Match	Replay
Central Greece/Islands Football Clubs Association
Panelefsiniakos	2–0	Atromitos Piraeus		
Apollon Athens	3–2	Proodeftiki		
AEK Athens	2–0	AE Pangrati		
Achilleus Corinth	3–0	Pelops Kiatou		
Pallesviakos^{9}	2–0	Aetos Chios	0–0^{10}	2–0
Patras/Western Greece Football Clubs Association
Panachaiki	2–0	Achaiki		
Olympiakos Patras	0–2	Thyella Patras		
Crete Football Clubs Association
Ergotelis	?	Iraklis Heraklion		
Thessaly Football Clubs Association
Olympiacos Volos	2–0^{11}	Iraklis Larissa		
Eastern Macedonia Football Clubs Association
Elpida Drama	2–0	Doxa Drama		

^{9} Pallesviakos qualified for the next phase, where he would face a team from Central Greece, but resigned due to inability to cover the travel expenses of the Athenian club.

^{10} Suspended due to rainfall.

^{11} Suspended at the 43rd minute due to the withdrawal of Iraklis Heraklion.

=== Sixth round ===
Team 1	Score	Team 2
Central Greece/Islands Football Clubs Association
Achilleus Corinth	1–2	Panelefsiniakos
AEK Athens	bye	
Apollon Athens	bye	
Patras/Western Greece Football Clubs Association
Panachaiki	2–1	Thyella Patras
Apollon Kalamata	0–2	Panachaiki
Thessaly Football Clubs Association
Olympiacos Volos	7–0	Enosis Chalkida
Eastern Macedonia Football Clubs Association
Aspida Xanthi	1–3	Elpida Drama

== Knockout phase ==
In the knockout phase, teams play against each other over a single match. If the match ends up as a draw, extra time will be played and if the match remains a draw a replay match is set at the home of the guest team which the extra time rule stands as well. That procedure will be repeated until a winner occurs.
The mechanism of the draws for each round is as follows:

- The round of 16 is contested by the eight top teams of each association and the eight clubs that passed the qualification round.
  There are no seedings, and teams from the same group can be drawn against each other.

== Bracket ==
Round of 16
Olympiacos	0	0
AEK Athens	0	2
Ergotelis	0
Apollon Athens	2
Panathinaikos	2
Panelefsiniakos	0
Olympiacos Volos	1	1
Iraklis	1	2
Elpida Drama	1
Aris	3
PAOK	2
Makedonikos	1
Panachaiki	0
Ethnikos Piraeus (w/o)	2
Panionios	2
Fostiras	1

Quarter-finals
AEK Athens (a.e.t.)	2	0
Apollon Athens	2	0
Panathinaikos	1
Iraklis	0
Aris	3	3
PAOK	3	1
Ethnikos Piraeus	2
Panionios	1

Semi-finals
AEK Athens (a.e.t.)	1	3
Panathinaikos	1	1
Aris	2
Ethnikos Piraeus	1

Final
AEK Athens	4
Aris	0

== Round of 16 ==
Team 1	Score/Agg.	Team 2	Match	Replay
Panathinaikos	2–0	Panelefsiniakos		
Panionios	2–1	Fostiras		
PAOK	2–1	Makedonikos		
Ergotelis	0–2	Apollon Athens		
Elpida Drama	1–3	Aris		
Olympiacos Volos	1–2 (a.e.t.)	Iraklis		
Olympiacos	0–2	AEK Athens	0–0 (a.e.t.)	0–2
Panachaiki	0–2 (w/o)	Ethnikos Piraeus		

== Quarter-finals ==
Team 1	Score/Agg.	Team 2	Match	Replay
Panathinaikos	1–0 (a.e.t.)	Iraklis		
AEK Athens	2–2	Apollon Athens	2–2 (a.e.t.)	0–0^{12} (a.e.t.)
Ethnikos Piraeus	2–1 (a.e.t.)	Panionios		
Aris	6–4	PAOK	3–3 (a.e.t.)	3–1

^{12} AEK Athens won by draw.

== Semi-finals ==
Team 1	Score/Agg.	Team 2	Match	Replay
Aris	2–1	Ethnikos Piraeus		
AEK Athens	4–2	Panathinaikos	1–1 (a.e.t.)	3–1 (a.e.t.)

== Final ==
28 May 1950
17:15 EET

AEK Athens	4–0	Aris
Maropoulos 6'; Arvanitis 45'; Kountouris 63', 67'	Report (page 2)

Leoforos Alexandras Stadium, Ampelokipoi
Attendance: 5,500
Referee: Sotiris Asprogerakas (Athens)
