= 1948–49 Greek Football Cup =

1948–49 Greek Cup
Tournament details
- Country: Greece
- Teams: 139

Final positions
- Champions: AEK Athens (3rd title)
- Runners-up: Panathinaikos

Tournament statistics
- Matches played: 145
- Goals scored: 518 (3.57 per match)

The 1948–49 Greek Football Cup was the seventh edition of the Greek Football Cup. The competition culminated with the Greek Cup final, replayed at Leoforos Alexandras Stadium, on 3 July 1949, because of the previous match (19 June) draw. The match was contested by AEK Athens and Panathinaikos, with AEK Athens winning by 2–1 after extra time.

== Calendar ==
| Round | Date(s) | Fixtures | Clubs | New entries |
|---|---|---|---|---|
| First Round | 3, 6, 13 October 1948 | 24 | 139 → 116 | 46 |
| Second Round | 17, 20, 21 October 1948 | 33 | 116 → 84 | 41 |
| Third Round | 23, 24 October 1948 | 19 | 84 → 67 | 33 |
| Additional Round | 30, 31 October 3, 7, 10, November 1948 | 10 | 67 → 58 | 7 |
| Fourth Round | 14, 17, 18 November 1948 | 13 | 58 → 46 | 4 |
| Fifth Round | 21, 28 November, 2 December 1948 | 12 | 46 → 34 | none |
| Sixth Round | 5 December 1948 | 7 | 34 → 26 | none |
| Seventh Round | 12, 14, 19, 25, 26 December 1948 | 6 | 26 → 19 | none |
| Eighth Round | 6, 16, 20, 23 January 1949 | 4 | 19 → 16 | none |
| Round of 16 | 30 January 1949 | 9 | 16 → 8 | 8 |
| Quarter-finals | 20 February 1949 | 4 | 8 → 4 | none |
| Semi-finals | 10 April 1949 | 2 | 4 → 2 | none |
| Final | 19 June, 3 July 1949 | 2 | 2 → 1 | none |

== Qualification round ==
=== First round ===
| Team 1 | Score/Agg. | Team 2 | Match | Replay |
|---|---|---|---|---|
Central Greece/Islands Football Clubs Association
| Niki Ampelokipoi | 2–0 | Aiolikos Tzitzifies | | |
| Asteras Athens | 3–0 | Proodeftiki | | |
| Eleftheroupoli | 1–2 | Archimidis Piraeus | | |
| Daphni Athens | 1–3 | Aris Piraeus | | |
| Ageleousiakos Kallithea | ? | Piraikos | | |
| Niki Plakas | 3–2 | Pantzitzifiakos | | |
| Ethnikos Asteras | 6–0 | Achilleus Piraeus | | |
| Kallithaikos | 1–2 | Doxa Athens | | |
| Keramikos Lachanagora | 2–4 | Ampelakiakos Salamina | | |
| Fostiras | 3–0 | Argonaftis Piraeus | | |
| Doxa Piraeus | 0–1 | Agios Dimitrios | | |
| AE Chalandri | 6–0 | Panerythraikos | | |
| A.O. Kifisia | 3–4 | AE Ampelokipoi | 2–2 (a.e.t.) | 1–2 |
| Olympias Athens | 0–1 | Chalkidona | | |
| Egaleo | 5–2 | Hellas Moschato | | |
| AE Nea Elvetia | ? | Armeniki | | |
| AE Karava | 1–3 | Victoria | | |
| Neapolis | 7–0 | Panexarchiakos | | |
| AE Nikaia | 0–1 | Esperos Kallitheas | | |
| Panelefsiniakos | 1–3 | Attikos | | |
| Panionios | 6–0 | Filalthloi Piraeus | | |
| AE Nea Ionia | 3–2 | Proodos Patisia | | |
| Ethnikos Piraeus | 5–3 | Aris Athens | | |

=== Second round ===
| Team 1 | Score/Agg. | Team 2 | Match | Replay |
|---|---|---|---|---|
Central Greece/Islands Football Clubs Association
| Fostiras | 5–0 | Niki Ampelokipoi | | |
| AE Nea Ionia | 1–4 | Attikos | | |
| Esperos Kallitheas | 3–1 | Ageleousiakos Kallithea | | |
| AE Chalandri | 3–2 | Niki Plakas | | |
| Ethnikos Asteras | 1–6 | Neapolis | 1–1 (a.e.t.) | 0–5 |
| Egaleo | 2–1 | Victoria | | |
| AE Nea Elvetia | 7–1 | Chalkidona | | |
| Ampelakiakos Salamina | 1–2 | Agios Dimitrios | | |
| Aris Piraeus | 11–2 | Doxa Athens | | |
| Hellas Syros | 0–6 | Asteras Athens | | |
| Panionios | 7–4 | AE Ampelokipoi | 1–1 (a.e.t.) | 6–1 |
| Ethnikos Piraeus | 6–0 | Archimidis Piraeus | | |
| Olympiacos Korinthos | 2–1 | Olympiacos Loutraki | | |
| Dorieus | 3–1 | Ialysos | | |
Crete Football Clubs Association
| Ergotelis | 6–1 | Ermis Heraklion | | |
| Keravnos Rethymno | 7–0 | Atromitos Rethymno | | |
Patras/Western Greece Football Clubs Association
| Panachaiki | 2–0 | Ethnikos Patras | | |
| Olympiakos Patras | 3–2 | Patreus | | |
| A.E. Messolonghi | 0–1 | Apollon Patras | | |
| Iraklis Pyrgos | 3–0 | Apollon Pyrgos | | |
| Apollon Kalamata | 1–0 | AEK Kalamon | | |
Thessaly Football Clubs Association
| Toxotis Larissa | 2–0 | Aris Larissa | | |
| Ethnikos Thiva | 0–2 (w/o)^{1} | Ionikos Asteras Thiva | | |
| Pallevadiaki | 1–3 | Olympiacos Lamia | | |
Thessaloniki Football Clubs Association
| Meliteus | 4–1^{2} | Marathon | | |
| Megas Alexandros | 6–1 | Thermaikos | | |
| AE Ampelokipoi Thessaloniki | 0–2 | PO Profitis Ilias | | |
| Apollon Kalamarias | 0–2 | Akritas Sykeon | | |
| MENT | 1–2 | PO Xirokrini | | |
| Apollon Serres | 4–1 | Iraklis Serres | | |
Eastern Macedonia Football Clubs Association
| Aris Drama | ? | Elpis Drama | | |
| Filippoi Kavala | ? | Vyron Kavala | | |

^{1} Ethnikos Thiva were zeroed due to late arrival in the match. A friendly match against Ionikos Asteras Thiva took place instead that ended 3–7.

^{2} Accoarding to some reports the final score was 4–3.

=== Third round ===
| Team 1 | Score/Agg. | Team 2 | Match | Replay |
|---|---|---|---|---|
Central Greece/Islands Football Clubs Association
| Achilleus Corinth | 2–0 | Aris Corinth | | |
| Pelops Kiato | 2–0 (w/o)^{3} | Olympiacos Korinthos | | |
Crete Football Clubs Association
| OFI | 3–0 | Iraklis Heraklion | | |
Patras/Western Greece Football Clubs Association
| AEK Patras | 1–3 | Thyella Patras | | |
| Achilleus Patras | 4–0 | Iraklis Patras | | |
| Achaiki | 2–6 | Proodeftiki Patras | 2–2 (a.e.t.) | 0–4 |
| Panetolikos | 3–0 | Asteras Patras | | |
| Prasina Poulia | 1–3 | Proskopoi Kalamon | | |
Thessaly Football Clubs Association
| Iraklis Larissa | 4–0 | Larisaikos | | |
| Niki Volos | 3–1 | Kentavros Volos | | |
| Olympiacos Volos | 8–0 | Anagennisi Volos | | |
| Propontis Chalkida | ? | AEK Chalkida | | |
| Panthivaikos | 2–2^{4} | Ionikos Asteras Thiva | | |
Eastern Macedonia Football Clubs Association
| Doxa Drama | ? | Vyron Drama | | |
| Iraklis Kavala | 5–2 (a.e.t.) | AE Kavala | | |
| Aspida Xanthi | 4–2 | Orfeas Xanthi | 1–1 (a.e.t.) | 3–1 |
| Orfeas Komotini | ? | AE Komotini | | |

^{3} Olympiacos Korinthos won the match by 2–3, but were zeroed due to illegal usage of football players.

^{4} Suspended due to the withdrawal of Ionikos Astaras Thiva.

=== Additional round ===
| Team 1 | Score/Agg. | Team 2 | Match | Replay |
|---|---|---|---|---|
Central Greece/Islands Football Clubs Association
| Pelops Kiatou | 2–3 | Achilleus Corinth | | |
Crete Football Clubs Association
| EGOH | 2–1 | Olympiacos Heraklion | | |
Patras/Western Greece Football Clubs Association
| Apollon Kalamata | 2–1 | Proskopoi Kalamon | | |
Thessaly Football Clubs Association
| AE Chalkida | ? | Olympiacos Chalkida | | |
| Orchomenos | 2–2 (w/o)^{5} | Aris Thiva | 1–1 (a.e.t.) | 1–1 |
Thessaloniki Football Clubs Association
| Makedonikos | 3–1 | Megas Alexandros | | |
| PO Xirokrini | 3–1 | PO Profitis Ilias | | |
| Meliteus | 1–2 | Akritas Sykeon | | |
| Orfeas Serres | ? | Apollon Serres | | |

^{5} Aris Thiva resigned.

=== Fourth round ===
| Team 1 | Score/Agg. | Team 2 | Match | Replay |
|---|---|---|---|---|
Central Greece/Islands Football Clubs Association
| Panionios | 5–0 | Neapolis | | |
| Diagoras | 2–1 | Dorieus | ? | 2–1 |
Crete Football Clubs Association
| Ergotelis | 2–1 | EGOH | | |
| Keravnos Rethymno | 2–1 | OFI | | |
Patras/Western Greece Football Clubs Association
| Aris Kerkyra | 0–2 (w/o) | Thyella Patras | | |
Thessaly Football Clubs Association
| Toxotis Larissa | 3–0 | Iraklis Larissa | | |
| Niki Volos | 3–1 | Pagasitikos Volos | | |
| AEK Chalkida | 1–4 | Olympiacos Chalkida | 1–1 | 0–3 |
Thessaloniki Football Clubs Association
| PO Xirokrini | 4–0 | Akritas Sykeon | | |
Eastern Macedonia Football Clubs Association
| Elpis Drama | 2–1 | Doxa Drama | | |
| Orfeas Eleftheroupoli | 2–3 | Iraklis Kavala | | |
| Aspida Xanthi | 5–0 | Orfeas Komotini | | |

=== Fifth round ===
| Team 1 | Score/Agg. | Team 2 | Match | Replay |
|---|---|---|---|---|
Central Greece/Islands Football Clubs Association
| Asteras Athens | 4–2 | AE Chalandri | | |
| Esperos Kallitheas | 1–0 | Agios Dimitrios | | |
| Ethnikos Piraeus | 3–1 | AE Nea Elvetia | | |
| Aris Piraeus | 0–2 | Egaleo | | |
Patras/Western Greece Football Clubs Association
| Olympiakos Patras | 2–0 | Apollon Patras | | |
| Panachaiki | 2–0 (w/o) | Proodeftiki Patras | | |
| Panetolikos | 1–3 | Achilleus Patras | 1–1 (a.e.t.) | 0–2 |
| Apollon Kalamata | 2–0 (w/o) | Iraklis Pyrgos | | |
Thessaly Football Clubs Association
| Toxotis Larissa | 1–3 | Olympiacos Volos | | |
| Panthivaikos | 0–2 | Orchomenos | ? | 0–2^{6} |
Eastern Macedonia Football Clubs Association
| Aspida Xanthi | 1–2 | Iraklis Kavala | | |
| Filippoi Kavala | 2–3 | Elpis Drama | | |

^{6} Panthivaikos left the match at the 85th minute, after they conceided the second goal.

=== Sixth round ===
| Team 1 | Score | Team 2 |
|---|---|---|
Central Greece/Islands Football Clubs Association
| Fostiras | 6–3 | Attikos |
| Ethnikos Piraeus | 3–0 | Egaleo |
| Achilleus Corinth | 0–2 | Esperos Kallitheas |
Patras/Western Greece Football Clubs Association
| Panachaiki | 3–1 | Olympiakos Patras |
| Apollon Kalamata | 2–0 (w/o) | Thyella Patras |
Thessaly Football Clubs Association
| Olympiacos Volos | 3–1 | Niki Volos |
| Olympiacos Chalkida | 5–3 (a.e.t.) | Orchomenos |
Thessaloniki Football Clubs Association
| Makedonikos | 2–1 | PO Xirokrini |

=== Seventh round ===
| Team 1 | Score | Team 2 |
|---|---|---|
Central Greece/Islands Football Clubs Association
| Asteras Athens | 0–4 | Fostiras |
| Panionios | 0–2 | Esperos Kallitheas |
| Diagoras | 0–2 (w/o) | Ethnikos Piraeus |
Crete Greece Football Clubs Association
| Ergotelis | 2–1 | Keravnos Rethymno |
Thessaly Football Clubs Association
| Olympiacos Lamia | ? | Olympiacos Chalkida |
Thessaloniki Football Clubs Association
| Makedonikos | ? | Orfeas Serres |
Eastern Macedonia Football Clubs Association
| Filippoi Kavala | ? | Iraklis Kavala |

=== Eighth round ===
| Team 1 | Score/Agg. | Team 2 | Match | Replay |
|---|---|---|---|---|
Patras Football Clubs Association
| Panachaiki | 4–3 | Achilleus Patras | 0–0 (a.e.t.) | 4–3 (a.e.t.) |
| Panachaiki | 3–1 (a.e.t.) | Apollon Kalamata | | |
Thessaly Football Clubs Association
| Olympiacos Volos | 6–0 | Olympiacos Lamia | | |

== Knockout phase ==
In the knockout phase, teams play against each other over a single match. If the match ends up as a draw, extra time will be played and if the match remains a draw a replay match is set at the home of the guest team which the extra time rule stands as well. That procedure will be repeated until a winner occurs.
The mechanism of the draws for each round is as follows:

- In the draw for the round of 16, the eight top teams of each association are seeded and the eight clubs that passed the qualification round are unseeded.
  The seeded teams are drawn against the unseeded teams with the exception of 2 draws.
- In the draws for the quarter-finals onwards, there are no seedings, and teams from the same group can be drawn against each other.

== Bracket ==
Round of 16
Iraklis Kavala | 2
Makedonikos | 1
Ergotelis | 1
AEK Athens | 9
Olympiacos | 3
Esperos Kallitheas | 1
Fostiras (a.e.t.) | 2
Atromitos Piraeus | 0
Olympiacos Volos | 1
PAOK | 2
Iraklis | 1 | 2
Aris | 1 | 0
Panathinaikos | 2
Ethnikos Piraeus | 0
Panachaiki | 1
Apollon Athens | 2

Quarter-finals
Iraklis Kavala | 1
AEK Athens | 4
Olympiacos | 3 | 4
Fostiras | 3 | 1
PAOK | 2
Iraklis | 1
Panathinaikos | 4
Apollon Athens | 1

Semi-finals
AEK Athens | 2
Olympiacos | 1
PAOK | 0
Panathinaikos | 1

Final
AEK Athens (a.e.t.) | 0 | 2
Panathinaikos | 0 | 1

== Round of 16 ==
| Team 1 | Score/Agg. | Team 2 | Match | Replay |
|---|---|---|---|---|
| Olympiacos | 3–1 | Esperos Kallitheas | | |
| Panachaiki | 1–2 | Apollon Athens | | |
| Olympiacos Volos | 0–2 | PAOK | | |
| Ergotelis | 1–9 | AEK Athens | | |
| Panathinaikos | 2–0 | Ethnikos Piraeus | | |
| Iraklis Kavala | 2–1 | Makedonikos | | |
| Fostiras | 2–0 (a.e.t.) | Atromitos Piraeus | | |
| Iraklis | 3–1 | Aris | 1–1 (a.e.t.) | 2–0 |

== Quarter-finals ==
| Team 1 | Score/Agg. | Team 2 | Match | Replay |
|---|---|---|---|---|
| PAOK | 2–1 | Iraklis | | |
| Panathinaikos | 4–1 | Apollon Athens | | |
| Iraklis Kavala | 1–4 | AEK Athens | | |
| Olympiacos | 7–4 | Fostiras | 3–3 (a.e.t.) | 4–1 |

== Semi-finals ==
| Team 1 | Score | Team 2 |
|---|---|---|
| AEK Athens | 2–1 | Olympiacos |
| PAOK | 0–1 | Panathinaikos |

== Final ==
19 June 1949
18:00 EET

| AEK Athens | 0–0 (a.e.t.) | Panathinaikos |
|---|---|---|
| | Report |

Leoforos Alexandras Stadium, Athens
Attendance: 15,000
Referee: Aristidis Ioannidis (Thessaloniki)

The match was abandoned at the 109 minute.

=== Replay match ===
3 July 1949
17:30 EET

| AEK Athens | 2–1 (a.e.t.) | Panathinaikos |
|---|---|---|
| Patakas 10', 105' | Report | Fylaktos 69' |

Leoforos Alexandras Stadium, Athens
Attendance: 15,000
Referee: Giannis Daskalakis (Piraeus)
