= Pandramaikos F.C. =

Pandramaikos
- Full name: Pandramaikos Athletic Club
- Founded: 1969; 57 years ago
- Ground: Municipal Stadium of Drama
- Capacity: 4,500
- Chairman: Tasos Koulaouzidis
- Manager: Ilias Pantzaridis
- League: Drama FCA First Division
- 2025–26: Drama FCA First Division, 4th
Home colours

Pandramaikos Football Club (Greek: Πανδραμαϊκός Αθλητικός Όμιλος) is a Greek football club based in Drama, Greece.

== History ==
The club was established in 1969 after a merger of two local teams - Aris (established in 1926) and Elpida (established in 1922).

Pandramaikos have previously played at the Second Division, spending a total of ten seasons at that level.

== Stadium ==
The club plays its home games at the Municipal Stadium of Drama, which has a capacity of 4,500.

== Crest and colours ==
The club colours are red and white.

== Honours ==
=== Domestic ===
- Fourth Division: 2
  - 1990–91, 2003–04
- Drama FCA Champions: 5
  - 1969–70, 2001–02, 2006–07, 2009–10, 2018–19
- Drama FCA Cup Winners: 12
  - 1969–70, 1978–79, 1981–82, 1982–83, 1983–84, 1985–86, 1995–96, 1996–97, 1998–99, 2006–07, 2009–10, 2018–19
- Drama FCA Super Cup Winners: 3
  - 2004, 2010, 2019
- Greek Football Amateur Cup Winners: 1
  - 1986
