= Greek Football Cup =

Men's association football cup in Greece

Greek Cup
- Organiser(s): Hellenic Football Federation
- Founded: 1931; 95 years ago
- Region: Greece
- Teams: 28 (from 2026–27)
- Qualifier for: UEFA Europa League; Greek Super Cup
- Related competitions: Super League 1; Super League 2
- Current champions: OFI (2nd title)
- Most championships: Olympiacos (29 titles)
- Broadcaster: SKAI TV Channel
- Website: www.epo.gr
- 2026–27 Greek Cup

The Greek Football Cup (Greek: Κύπελλο Ελλάδας), officially known as Greek Cup Betsson (Greek: Κύπελλο Ελλάδας Superbet) for sponsorship reasons is a Greek association football competition, run by the Hellenic Football Federation.

The Greek Cup is the second-most important domestic men's football event in Greece, after the championship of Super League. Since its inception in 1931 it has been held 83 times, with a cup winner being crowned on 82 occasions, the final in 1962 being the only occasion when no champion was crowned.

Olympiacos is the most successful club, having earned 29 trophies. In the most recent season, OFI was crowned the winner for the second time in its history.

== History ==
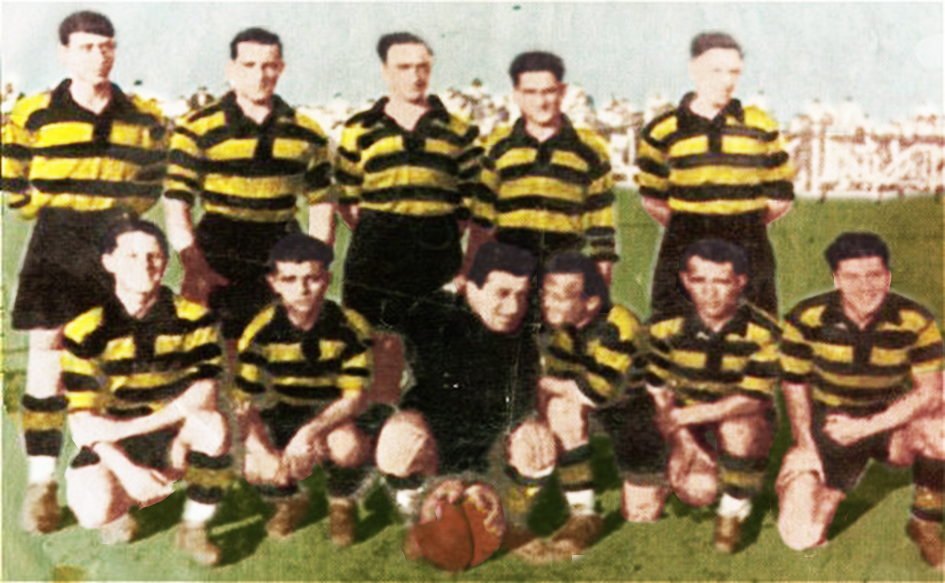
AEK Athens' team which won the first Greek Cup in 1932.

The Greek Cup under HFF began in 1931. In its early years, entry was optional. Teams were paired against each other by the football associations, without a draw taking place. Later on, for many years, a proper draw took place and also two-legged matches were added.

The participation of Olympiacos and Panathinaikos in the 1962 final is counted for both as the presence of a finalist, since the match was stopped due to darkness in overtime (0-0). Due to the incidents between the players of the two teams, the incidents in the stands, the excessive delays and the suspicion that all this was intentional for the match to be repeated and for the teams to make bigger profits, the GGA council decided to punish the EPO with a reprimand and banned the replay of the match as a penalty for both teams

Until 1964, if the final score was a draw (including extra time), the two teams played a replay match, while penalties didn't exist. That year, in the semi-final between Panathinaikos and Olympiacos (1–1 at the time), fans of both teams stormed the pitch, damaged the football field and virtually stopped the game, believing that it was fixed to end in a draw, in order to be replayed for financial reasons. Both teams were ejected from the competition and therefore, in 1964 AEK won the title but the final match was not held. AEK also won in similar fashion in 1966 when Olympiacos did not show up in the final.

In 1965, a new rule was applied, to determine that, if the game was undecided even after extra time, the winner would be determined by the toss of a coin. Panathinaikos won this way in the 1969 final against Olympiacos . Afterwards the penalty shootout was applied. Until 1971, teams from all over the country, professional and amateur, had been taking part. Each team first played against clubs from its own association and the winners continued in a nationwide competition. Due to this, strong professional sides met amateur neighbourhood teams, sometimes beating them with high scores; a 23–0 win in an Apollon Athens vs. PAO Neas Melandias match on 23 September 1959 remains a record win for the Greek Cup until today. Since 1971, only teams from professional divisions are allowed to participate, while amateur clubs take part in the Amateur Cup.

In 1991 and 1992 the finals were two-legged matches.

One important match in the history of the competition was the 2009 final between Olympiacos and AEK (3–3 full time, 4–4 after extra time and 15–14 on penalties).

The Greek cup was completely reformed from the 2025-26 season onwards. The new form of the competition includes qualifying rounds, a league phase and single (not two-legged) quarterfinals. Teams that win the local FCA cups also no longer participate, with participation limited to teams from Super League 1 and Super League 2.

== Cup Winners ==
11 clubs have won the Greek Cup.

- 1931–32: AEK Athens (1)
- 1932–33: Ethnikos Piraeus (1)
- 1938–39: AEK Athens (2)
- 1939–40: Panathinaikos (1)
- 1946–47: Olympiacos (1)
- 1947–48: Panathinaikos (2)
- 1948–49: AEK Athens (3)
- 1949–50: AEK Athens (4)
- 1950–51: Olympiacos (2)
- 1951–52: Olympiacos (3)
- 1952–53: Olympiacos (4)
- 1953–54: Olympiacos (5)
- 1954–55: Panathinaikos (3)
- 1955–56: AEK Athens (5)
- 1956–57: Olympiacos (6)
- 1957–58: Olympiacos (7)
- 1958–59: Olympiacos (8)
- 1959–60: Olympiacos (9)
- 1960–61: Olympiacos (10)
- 1961–62: –
- 1962–63: Olympiacos (11)
- 1963–64: AEK Athens (6)
- 1964–65: Olympiacos (12)
- 1965–66: AEK Athens (7)
- 1966–67: Panathinaikos (4)
- 1967–68: Olympiacos (13)
- 1968–69: Panathinaikos (5)
- 1969–70: Aris (1)
- 1970–71: Olympiacos (14)
- 1971–72: PAOK (1)
- 1972–73: Olympiacos (15)
- 1973–74: PAOK (2)
- 1974–75: Olympiacos (16)
- 1975–76: Iraklis (1)
- 1976–77: Panathinaikos (6)
- 1977–78: AEK Athens (8)
- 1978–79: Panionios (1)
- 1979–80: Kastoria (1)
- 1980–81: Olympiacos (17)
- 1981–82: Panathinaikos (7)
- 1982–83: AEK Athens (9)
- 1983–84: Panathinaikos (8)
- 1984–85: AEL (1)
- 1985–86: Panathinaikos (9)
- 1986–87: OFI (1)
- 1987–88: Panathinaikos (10)
- 1988–89: Panathinaikos (11)
- 1989–90: Olympiacos (18)
- 1990–91: Panathinaikos (12)
- 1991–92: Olympiacos (19)
- 1992–93: Panathinaikos (13)
- 1993–94: Panathinaikos (14)
- 1994–95: Panathinaikos (15)
- 1995–96: AEK Athens (10)
- 1996–97: AEK Athens (11)
- 1997–98: Panionios (2)
- 1998–99: Olympiacos (20)
- 1999–00: AEK Athens (12)
- 2000–01: PAOK (3)
- 2001–02: AEK Athens (13)
- 2002–03: PAOK (4)
- 2003–04: Panathinaikos (16)
- 2004–05: Olympiacos (21)
- 2005–06: Olympiacos (22)
- 2006–07: AEL (2)
- 2007–08: Olympiacos (23)
- 2008–09: Olympiacos (24)
- 2009–10: Panathinaikos (17)
- 2010–11: AEK Athens (14)
- 2011–12: Olympiacos (25)
- 2012–13: Olympiacos (26)
- 2013–14: Panathinaikos (18)
- 2014–15: Olympiacos (27)
- 2015–16: AEK Athens (15)
- 2016–17: PAOK (5)
- 2017–18: PAOK (6)
- 2018–19: PAOK (7)
- 2019–20: Olympiacos (28)
- 2020–21: PAOK (8)
- 2021–22: Panathinaikos (19)
- 2022–23: AEK Athens (16)
- 2023–24: Panathinaikos (20)
- 2024–25: Olympiacos (29)
- 2025–26: OFI (2)

Notes:

- In 1933–38 and 1940–46, the competition was not held (in 1940–41, only the first round was played).
- In 1961–62, the final match between Olympiacos and Panathinaikos was abandoned and the Cup withheld.
- In 1963–64 and 1965–66, the Final was scratched.
- In 84 editions of the competition, 83 have concluded with a Cup winner, and 82 finals have been played (one was abandoned).

== Performance by club ==
Nineteen clubs have reached the Greek Cup final and eleven of them have won it.

Club	Winners	Runners-up	Winning years	Runners-up years
Olympiacos	29	13 (Note: In addition to this total, the 1962 final between Olympiacos and Panathinaikos was interrupted in overtime. The match was not replayed and no team was declared a cup winner. Both teams are considered finalists.)	1947, 1951, 1952, 1953, 1954, 1957, 1958, 1959, 1960, 1961, 1963, 1965, 1968, 1971, 1973, 1975, 1981, 1990, 1992, 1999, 2005, 2006, 2008, 2009, 2012, 2013, 2015, 2020, 2025	1956, 1966 (Note: Qualified for the final but did not take part, with opponents AEK awarded the trophy.), 1969, 1974, 1976, 1986, 1988, 1993, 2001, 2002, 2004, 2016, 2021
Panathinaikos	20	10	1940, 1948, 1955, 1967, 1969, 1977, 1982, 1984, 1986, 1988, 1989, 1991, 1993, 1994, 1995, 2004, 2010, 2014, 2022, 2024	1949, 1960, 1965, 1968, 1972, 1975, 1997, 1998, 1999, 2007
AEK Athens	16	11	1932, 1939, 1949, 1950, 1956, 1964 (Note: Awarded trophy with no final played.), 1966, 1978, 1983, 1996, 1997, 2000, 2002, 2011, 2016, 2023	1948, 1953, 1979, 1994, 1995, 2006, 2009, 2017, 2018, 2019, 2020
PAOK	8	16	1972, 1974, 2001, 2003, 2017, 2018, 2019, 2021	1939, 1951, 1955, 1970, 1971, 1973, 1977, 1978, 1981, 1983, 1985, 1992, 2014, 2022, 2023, 2026
Panionios	2	4	1979, 1998	1952, 1961, 1967, 1989
AEL	2	2	1985, 2007	1982, 1984
OFI	2	2	1987, 2026	1990, 2025
Aris	1	9	1970	1932, 1933, 1940, 1950, 2003, 2005, 2008, 2010, 2024
Iraklis	1	4	1976	1947, 1957, 1980, 1987
Ethnikos	1	0	1933	
Kastoria	1	0	1980	
Doxa Drama	0	3		1954, 1958, 1959
Atromitos	0	2		2011, 2012
Pierikos	0	1		1963
Athinaikos	0	1		1991
Apollon Smyrnis	0	1		1996
Ionikos	0	1		2000
Asteras Tripolis	0	1		2013
Xanthi	0	1		2015

== Total titles won by city ==
11 clubs have won the Greek Football Cup, from a total of 6 cities.

City	Number of Titles	Clubs
Athens	38	Panathinaikos (20), AEK Athens (16), Panionios (2)
Piraeus	30	Olympiacos (29), Ethnikos Piraeus (1)
Thessaloniki	10	PAOK (8), Aris (1), Iraklis (1)
Larissa	2	AEL (2)
Heraklion	2	OFI (2)
Kastoria	1	Kastoria (1)

== See also ==
- Greek Football Amateur Cup
- Super League Greece
- Super League Greece 2
- Greek Super Cup
- Greek League Cup
