= 1960 Greek Football Cup final =

1960 Greek Cup final
- Event: 1959–60 Greek Football Cup
Panathinaikos	Olympiacos
- Olympiacos won after a replay
Panathinaikos	Olympiacos
1	1
- After extra time
- Date: 7 August 1960
- Venue: Leoforos Alexandras Stadium, Ampelokipoi, Athens
- Referee: José Blanco Pérez (Spain)
- Attendance: 25,000

Replay
Olympiacos	Panathinaikos
3	0
- Date: 11 September 1960
- Venue: Karaiskakis Stadium, Piraeus
- Referee: José Blanco Pérez (Spain)

The 1960 Greek Cup final was the 18th final of the Greek Cup. The initial match took place on 7 August 1960 at Leoforos Alexandras Stadium. The replay match took place on 11 September 1960 at Karaiskakis Stadium. The contesting teams were Panathinaikos and Olympiacos. It was Panathinaikos' fifth Greek Cup final in their 52 years of existence and Olympiacos' tenth Greek Cup final and fifth consecutive in their 35-year history.

== Venue ==
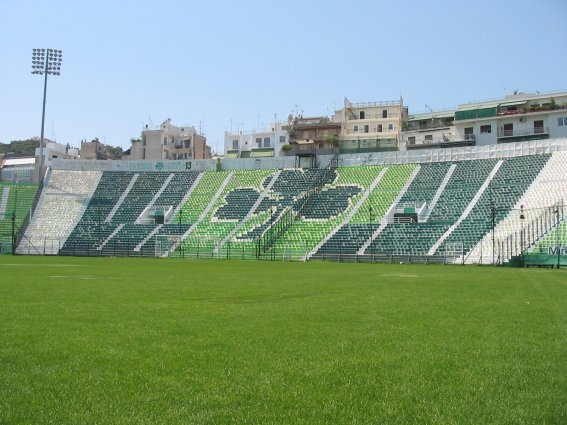
Leoforos Alexandras Stadium.

This was the fifteenth Greek Cup final held at Leoforos Alexandras Stadium, after the 1932, 1939, 1940, 1947, 1948, 1949, 1950, 1951, 1952, 1953, 1954, 1955, 1956 and 1959 finals. (Leoforos also hosted the replay match of the 1933 final between Ethnikos Piraeus and Aris, the replay match of the 1949 final between AEK Athens and Panathinaikos and the replay match of the 1952 final between Olympiacos and Panionios).

Leoforos Alexandras Stadium was built in 1922. The stadium is used as a venue for Panathinaikos and Greece. Its current capacity is 30,000.

== Background ==
Panathinaikos had reached the Greek Cup final four times, winning three of them. The last time that they had played in a final was in 1955, where they won PAOK by 1–0.

Olympiacos had reached the Greek Cup final nine times, winning eight of them. The last time that they had played in a final was in 1959, where they won Doxa Drama by 2–1.

The two teams had never met each other in a Cup final.

== Route to the final ==
Panathinaikos				Round	Olympiacos			
Opponent	Agg.	1st leg	2nd leg		Opponent	Agg.	1st leg	2nd leg
Apollon Kalamata	8–0 (H)			Round of 32	Diagoras	3–1 (H)		
Iraklis	1–0 (A)			Round of 16	ΑΕ Komotini	6–0 (H)		
Niki Volos	4–0 (H)			Quarter-finals	Olympiacos Chalkida	4–0 (H)		
Proodeftiki	4–4 (c)	1–1 (a.e.t.) (H)	3–3 (A)	Semi-finals	Panegialios	3–1 (H)		

== Match ==
=== Details ===
7 August 1960

Panathinaikos	1–1	Olympiacos
Papaemmanouil 16'	Report (page 5)	Bebis 50'

Leoforos Alexandras Stadium, Ampelokipoi
Attendance: 25,000
Referee: José Blanco Pérez (Spain)

GK	(Greece) Michalis Voutsaras
DF	(Greece) Nikos Tzounakos
DF	(Greece) Kostas Linoxilakis (c)
DF	(Greece) Dimitris Mantarakis
MF	(Greece) Giorgos Andreou
MF	(Greece) Ioannis Nembidis
MF	(Greece) Mimis Domazos
FW	(Greece) Dimitris Theofanis
FW	(Greece) Andreas Papaemmanouil
FW	(Greece) Mimis Bernardos
FW	(Greece) Vangelis Panakis
Manager:
(Greece) Antonis Migiakis

GK	(Greece) Savvas Theodoridis
DF	(Greece) Ilias Rosidis (c)
DF	(Greece) Giorgos Laimos
DF	(Greece) Dimitrios Stefanakos
MF	(Greece) Kostas Polychroniou
MF	(Greece) Babis Kotridis
MF	(Greece) Thanasis Bebis
FW	(Greece) Sotiris Gavetsos
FW	(Greece) Giorgos Sideris
FW	(Greece) Elias Yfantis
FW	(Greece) Kostas Papazoglou
Manager:
(Italy) Bruno Vale

Match rules

- 90 minutes
- 30 minutes of extra time if necessary
- Replay match if scores still level

== Replay ==
=== Details ===
11 September 1960

Olympiacos	3–0	Panathinaikos
Polychroniou 25', 35'; Sideris 82'	Report (page 5)

Karaiskakis Stadium, Piraeus
Referee: José Blanco Pérez (Spain)

GK	(Greece) Savvas Theodoridis
DF	(Greece) Ilias Rosidis (c)
DF	(Greece) Dimitrios Stefanakos
DF	(Greece) Giorgos Laimos
MF	(Greece) Kostas Polychroniou
MF	(Greece) Babis Kotridis
MF	(Greece) Stelios Psychos
FW	(Greece) Giorgos Sideris
FW	(Greece) Elias Yfantis
FW	(Greece) Aris Papazoglou
FW	(Greece) Thanasis Bebis
Manager:
(Italy) Bruno Vale

GK	(Greece) Michalis Voutsaras
DF	(Greece) Nikos Tzounakos
DF	(Greece) Kostas Linoxilakis (c)
DF	(Greece) Dimitris Mantarakis
MF	(Greece) Ioannis Nembidis
MF	(Greece) Giorgos Andreou
MF	(Greece) Mimis Domazos
FW	(Greece) Dimitris Theofanis
FW	(Greece) Andreas Papaemmanouil
FW	(Greece) Mimis Bernardos
FW	(Greece) Vangelis Panakis
Manager:
(Greece) Antonis Migiakis

Match rules

- 90 minutes
- 30 minutes of extra time if necessary
- Coin toss if scores still level

== See also ==
- 1959–60 Greek Football Cup
