= 1957 Greek Football Cup final =

1957 Greek Cup final
- Event: 1956–57 Greek Football Cup
Olympiacos	Iraklis
2	0
- Date: 29 July 1957^{*}
- Venue: Karaiskakis Stadium, Piraeus
- Referee: Leo Horn (Netherlands)

The 1957 Greek Cup final was the 15th final of the Greek Cup. The match took place on 29 July 1957^{*} at Karaiskakis Stadium. The contesting teams were Olympiacos and Iraklis. It was Olympiacos' seventh Greek Cup final and second consecutive in their 32 years of existence and Iraklis' second Greek Cup final in their 49-year history.

== Venue ==
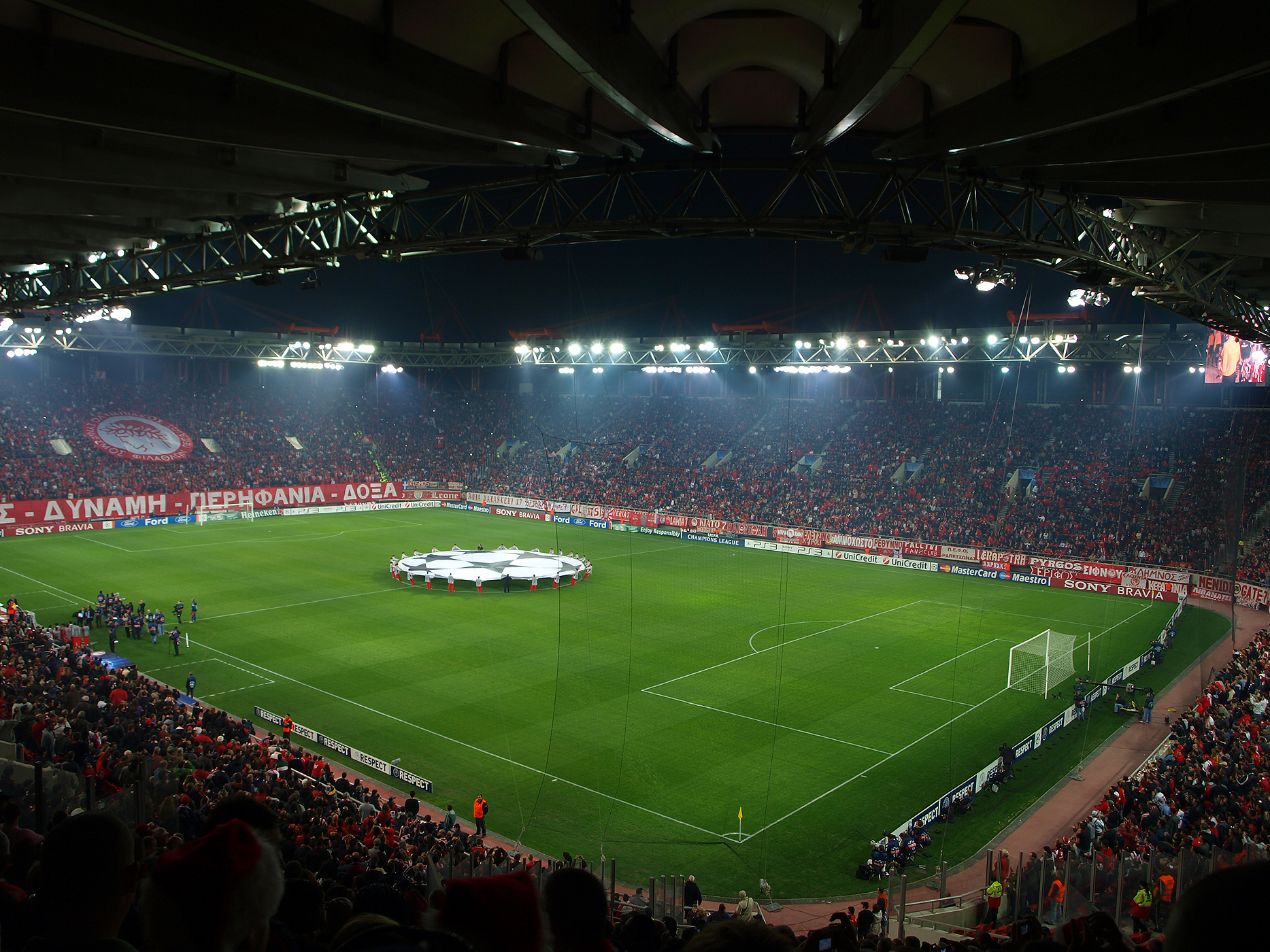
Karaiskakis Stadium.

This was the first Greek Cup final held at Karaiskakis Stadium.

Karaiskakis Stadium was built in 1895. The stadium is used as a venue for Olympiacos and Ethnikos Piraeus and was used for Greece on various occasions. Its current capacity is 42,000.

== Background ==
Olympiacos had reached the Greek Cup final six times, winning five of them. The last time that they had won the Cup was in 1954 (2–0 against Doxa Drama). The last time that had played in a final was in 1956, where they had lost to AEK Athens by 2–1.

Iraklis had reached the Greek Cup final one time in 1947, where they lost to Olympiacos by 5–0.

The two teams had met each other in a Cup final one time in the 1947 final.

== Route to the final ==
Olympiacos		Round	Iraklis	
Opponent	Result		Opponent	Result
Panargiakos	7–1 (A)	Round of 32	Ethnikos Piraeus	2–0 (w/o) (H)
Panionios	3–1 (H)	Round of 16	Doxa Drama	5–2 (H)
AEK Athens	1–0 (A)	Quarter-finals	Aspida Xanthi	3–0 (H)
Panathinaikos	2–1 (H)	Semi-finals	Apollon Athens	2–1 (H)

== Match ==
=== Details ===
29 July 1957^{*}

Olympiacos	2–0	Iraklis
Kotridis 38'; Yfantis 73'	Report (page 3)

Karaiskakis Stadium, Piraeus
Referee: Leo Horn (Netherlands)

*According to the Greek FA's official site, the match was played on 30 July.

GK	(Greece) Savvas Theodoridis
DF	(Greece) Ilias Rosidis (c)
DF	(Greece) Thanasis Kingley
DF	(Greece) Vasilis Xanthopoulos
MF	(Greece) Thanasis Bebis
MF	(Greece) Babis Kotridis
MF	(Greece) Antonis Poseidon
FW	(Greece) Themis Moustaklis
FW	(Greece) Elias Yfantis
FW	(Greece) Kostas Polychroniou
FW	(Greece) Sotiris Gavezos
Manager:
(Socialist Federal Republic of Yugoslavia) Prvoslav Dragićević

GK	(Greece) Ptolemaios
DF	(Greece) Lemonis
DF	(Greece) Peredimas
DF	(Greece) Liaros
MF	(Greece) Papadopoulos
MF	(Greece) Rammos
MF	(Greece) Pitsoudis
FW	(Greece) Chatzigiannidis
FW	(Greece) Stathis Chasekidis
FW	(Greece) Toumbelis
FW	(Greece) Lelos Chasekidis
Manager:

Match rules

- 90 minutes
- 30 minutes of extra time if necessary
- Replay match if scores still level

== See also ==
- 1956–57 Greek Football Cup
