= 1958 Greek Football Cup final =

1958 Greek Cup final
- Event: 1957–58 Greek Football Cup
Olympiacos	Doxa Drama
5	1
- Date: 30 July 1958
- Venue: Karaiskakis Stadium, Piraeus
- Referee: Zivko Bajić (Yugoslavia)
- Attendance: 22,000

The 1958 Greek Cup final was the 16th final of the Greek Cup. The match took place on 30 July 1958 at Karaiskakis Stadium. The contesting teams were Olympiacos and Doxa Drama. It was Olympiacos' eighth Greek Cup final and third consecutive in their 33 years of existence and Doxa Drama's second Greek Cup final in their 40-year history.

== Venue ==
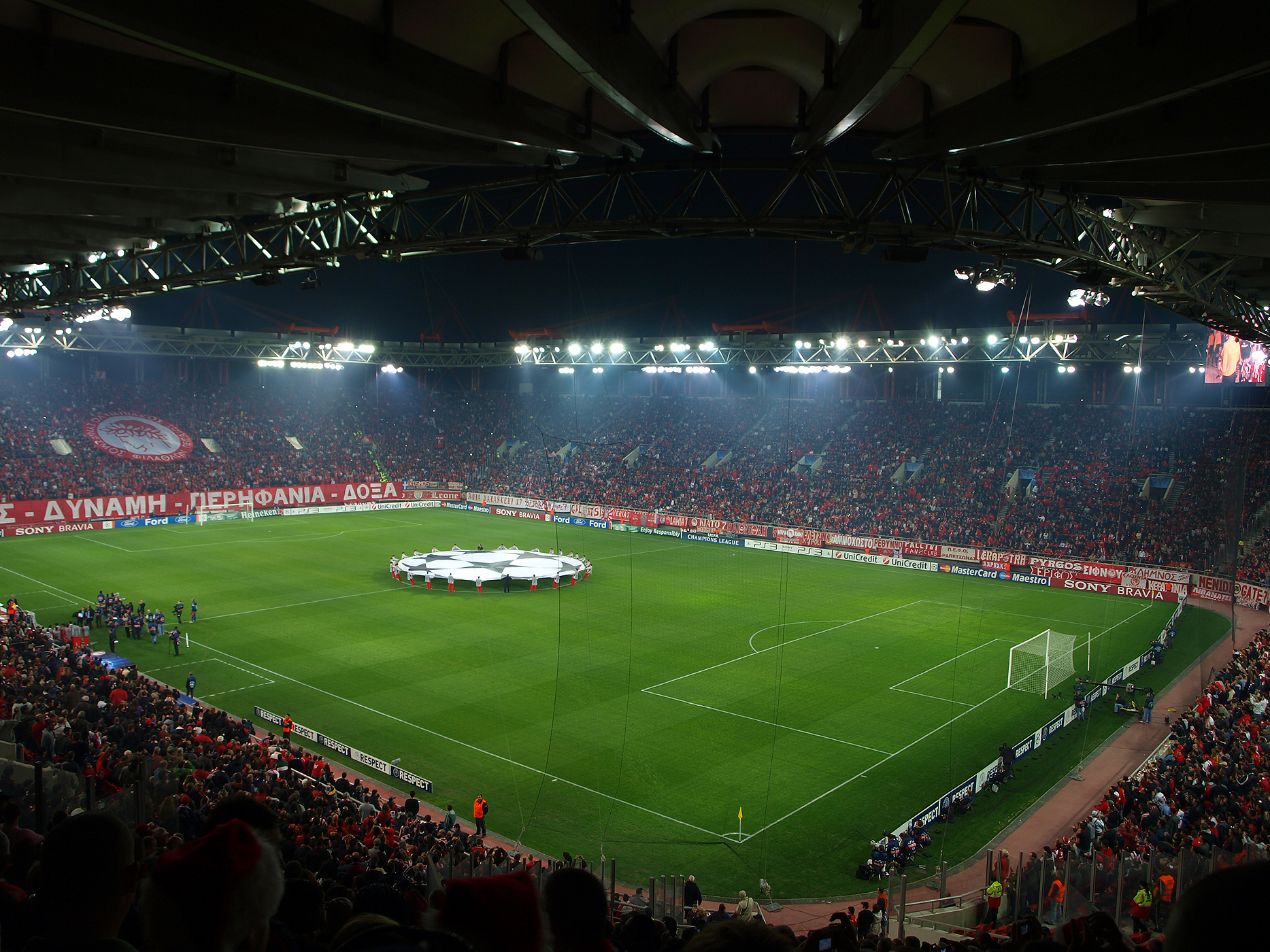
Karaiskakis Stadium.

This was the second Greek Cup final held at Karaiskakis Stadium, after the 1957 final.

Karaiskakis Stadium was built in 1895. The stadium is used as a venue for Olympiacos and Ethnikos Piraeus and was used for Greece on various occasions. Its current capacity is 42,000.

== Background ==
Olympiacos had reached the Greek Cup final seven times, winning six of them. The last time that they had played in a final was in 1957, where they won Iraklis by 2–0.

Doxa Drama had reached the Greek Cup final one time in 1954, where they lost to Olympiacos by 2–0.

The two teams had met each other in a Cup final one time in the 1954 final.

== Route to the final ==
Olympiacos				Round	Doxa Drama			
Opponent	Agg.	1st leg	2nd leg		Opponent	Agg.	1st leg	2nd leg
Olympiacos Chalkida	9–0 (H)			Round of 32	AE Kavala	2–0 (A)		
OFI	2–0 (A)			Round of 16	Apollon Kalamarias	1–0 (H)		
AEK Athens	2–1 (H)			Quarter-finals	Fostiras	3–1 (H)		
Panathinaikos	3–0 (H)			Semi-finals	Iraklis	2–1	1–1 (a.e.t.) (A)	1–0 (H)

== Match ==
=== Details ===
30 July 1958
17:15 EET

Olympiacos	5–1	Doxa Drama
Gavezos 22'; Bebis 43'; Polychroniou 63', 87'; Yfantis 89'	Report (page 4)	Nalbantis 52'

Karaiskakis Stadium, Piraeus
Attendance: 22,000
Referee: Zivko Bajić (Yugoslavia)

GK	(Greece) Savvas Theodoridis
DF	(Greece) Nikos Kambolis
DF	(Greece) Thanasis Kingley
DF	(Greece) Dimitrios Stefanakos
MF	(Greece) Filippos Tsantakis
MF	(Greece) Babis Kotridis (c)
MF	(Greece) Sotiris Gavezos
FW	(Greece) Elias Yfantis
FW	(Greece) Kostas Polychroniou
FW	(Greece) Thanasis Bebis
FW	(Greece) Stelios Psychos (red card) 88'
Manager:
(Hungary) Tibor Kemény

GK	(Greece) Samlidis
DF	(Greece) Giorgos Kotridis
DF	(Greece) Fanis Ignatiou (c)
DF	(Greece) Vasilis Similiotis
MF	(Greece) Pistikos
MF	(Greece) Takis Loukanidis
MF	(Greece) Pavlos Grigoriadis
FW	(Greece) Alekos Nalbantis
FW	(Greece) Antonis Georgiadis
FW	(Greece) Thanasis Loukanidis
FW	(Greece) Chatzimichail
Manager:
(Greece) Nikos Pangalos

Match rules

- 90 minutes
- 30 minutes of extra time if necessary
- Replay match if scores still level

== See also ==
- 1957–58 Greek Football Cup
