= 1959 Greek Football Cup final =

1959 Greek Cup final
- Event: 1958–59 Greek Football Cup
| Olympiacos | Doxa Drama |
| 2 | 1 |
- Date: 5 July 1959
- Venue: Leoforos Alexandras Stadium, Ampelokipoi, Athens
- Referee: Dimosthenis Stathatos (Athens)
- Attendance: 25,000

The 1959 Greek Cup final was the 17th final of the Greek Cup. The match took place on 5 July 1959 at Leoforos Alexandras Stadium. The contesting teams were Olympiacos and Doxa Drama for a second time in row. It was Olympiacos' ninth Greek Cup final and fourth consecutive in their 34 years of existence and Doxa Drama's third Greek Cup final and second consecutive in their 41-year history. The Prime Minister, Konstantinos Karamanlis attended the match and also awarded the trophy to the winners. With their conquest of the Cup, Olympiacos became the only team to win the double three seasons in a row.

== Venue ==
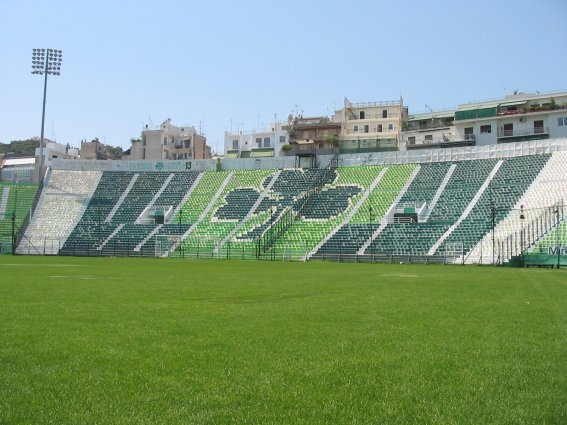
Leoforos Alexandras Stadium.

This was the fourteenth Greek Cup final held at Leoforos Alexandras Stadium, after the 1932, 1939, 1940, 1947, 1948, 1949, 1950, 1951, 1952, 1953, 1954, 1955 and 1956 finals. (Leoforos also hosted the replay match of the 1933 final between Ethnikos Piraeus and Aris, the replay match of the 1949 final between AEK Athens and Panathinaikos and the replay match of the 1952 final between Olympiacos and Panionios).

Leoforos Alexandras Stadium was built in 1922. The stadium is used as a venue for Panathinaikos and Greece. Its current capacity is 30,000.

== Background ==
Olympiacos had reached the Greek Cup final eight times, winning seven of them. The last time that they had played in a final was in 1958, where they won Doxa Drama by 5–1.

Doxa Drama had reached the Greek Cup final two times. The last time that they had played in a final was in 1958, where they lost to Olympiacos by 5–1.

The two teams had met each other in a Cup final two times in the 1954 and 1958 finals.

== Route to the final ==
| Olympiacos | | | | Round | Doxa Drama | | | |
|---|---|---|---|---|---|---|---|---|
| Opponent | Agg. | 1st leg | 2nd leg | | Opponent | Agg. | 1st leg | 2nd leg |
| Diagoras | 5–0 (A) | | | Round of 32 | Apollon Serres | 5–3 (A) | | |
| Ergotelis | 2–0 (A) | | | Round of 16 | Megas Alexandros Katerini | 1–0 (H) | | |
| AEK Athens | 5–3 | 2–2 (a.e.t.) (A) | 3–1 (A) | Quarter-finals | PAOK | 1–0 (H) | | |
| Apollon Athens | 3–1 | 1–1 (a.e.t.) (A) | 2–0 (H) | Semi-finals | Panionios | 2–1 (H) | | |

== Match ==
=== Details ===
5 July 1959
17:30 EET

| Olympiacos | 2–1 | Doxa Drama |
|---|---|---|
| Christoforidis 52'; Bebis* 59' | Report | Georgiadis 47' |

Leoforos Alexandras Stadium, Ampelokipoi
Attendance: 25,000
Referee: Dimosthenis Stathatos (Athens)

^{*}Greek FA's official site mention Yfantis as the scorer.

| GK | (Greece) Savvas Theodoridis |
| DF | (Greece) Vasilis Xanthopoulos |
| DF | (Greece) Thanasis Kingley (c) |
| DF | (Greece) Dimitrios Stefanakos |
| MF | (Greece) Giannis Ioannou |
| MF | (Greece) Kostas Polychroniou |
| MF | (Greece) Kostas Papazoglou |
| FW | (Greece) Petros Christoforidis |
| FW | (Greece) Elias Yfantis |
| FW | (Greece) Thanasis Bebis |
| FW | (Greece) Stelios Psychos |
Manager:
(Italy) Bruno Vale

| GK | (Greece) Pavlos Boitaris |
| DF | (Greece) Giorgos Kotridis |
| DF | (Greece) Fanis Ignatiou (c) |
| DF | (Greece) Nikos Nikolaidis |
| MF | (Greece) Takis Loukanidis |
| MF | (Greece) Nikos Tzaferis |
| FW | (Greece) Alekos Nalbantis |
| FW | (Greece) Pavlos Grigoriadis |
| FW | (Greece) Thanasis Loukanidis |
| FW | (Greece) Antonis Georgiadis |
| FW | (Greece) Vasilis Ioannou |
Manager:
(Greece) Nikos Pangalos

Assistant referees:
Dimitrakopoulos
Nikos Giannopoulos (Athens)

Match rules

- 90 minutes
- 30 minutes of extra time if necessary
- Replay match if scores still level

== See also ==
- 1958–59 Greek Football Cup
