= 1956 Greek Football Cup final =

1956 Greek Cup final
- Event: 1955–56 Greek Football Cup
AEK Athens	Olympiacos
2	1
- Date: 24 June 1956
- Venue: Leoforos Alexandras Stadium, Ampelokipoi, Athens
- Referee: Gino Rigato (Italy)
- Attendance: 25,000

The 1956 Greek Cup final was the 14th final of the Greek Cup. The match took place on 24 June 1956 at Leoforos Alexandras Stadium. The contesting teams were AEK Athens and Olympiacos. It was AEK Athens' seventh Greek Cup final in their 32 years of existence and Olympiacos' sixth Greek Cup final in their 31-year history.

== Venue ==
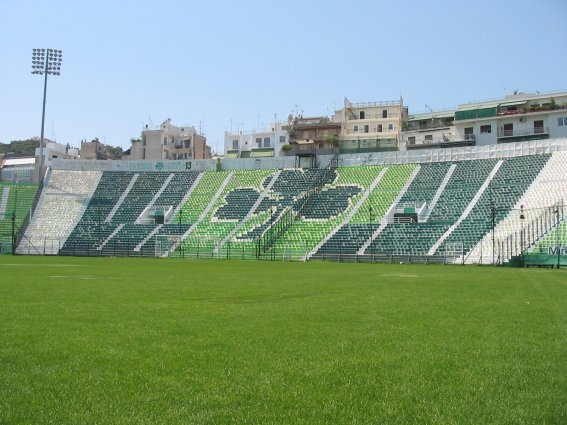
Leoforos Alexandras Stadium.

This was the thirteenth Greek Cup final held at Leoforos Alexandras Stadium, after the 1932, 1939, 1940, 1947, 1948, 1949, 1950, 1951, 1952, 1953, 1954 and 1955 finals. (Leoforos also hosted the replay match of the 1933 final between Ethnikos Piraeus and Aris, the replay match of the 1949 final between AEK Athens and Panathinaikos and the replay match of the 1952 final between Olympiacos and Panionios).

Leoforos Alexandras Stadium was built in 1922. The stadium is used as a venue for Panathinaikos and Greece. Its current capacity is 30,000.

== Background ==
AEK Athens had reached the Greek Cup final six times, winning four of them. The last time that they had won the Cup was in 1950 (4–0 against Aris). The last time that had played in a final was in 1953, where they had lost to Olympiacos by 3–2.

Olympiacos had reached the Greek Cup final five times, winning all of them. The last time that they played in a final was in 1954, where they had won Doxa Drama by 2–0.

The two teams had met each other in a Cup final one time in the 1953 final.

== Route to the final ==
AEK Athens		Round	Olympiacos	
Opponent	Result		Opponent	Result
Achilleas Korinthos	8–2 (A)	Round of 32	Fostiras	1–0 (A)
Averoff Ioannina	4–1 (H)	Round of 16	Pallevadiaki	7–0 (H)
Panionios	2–1 (H)	Quarter-finals	Niki Volos	4–0 (H)
Panathinaikos	2–1 (H)	Semi-finals	Aris	3–0 (A)

== Match ==
=== Details ===
24 June 1956

AEK Athens	2–1	Olympiacos
Chaniotis 22'; Kanakis 67'	Report	Darivas 26'

Leoforos Alexandras Stadium, Ampelokipoi
Attendance: 25,000
Referee: Gino Rigato (Italy)

GK	1	(Greece) Stelios Serafidis
DF	2	(Greece) Antonis Parayios
DF	3	(Greece) Antonis Karakatsanis
DF	4	(Greece) Thanasis Tsangaris
MF	5	(Greece) Kostas Poulis (c)
MF	6	(Greece) Kostas Zografos
FW	7	(Greece) Pavlos Emmanouilidis
FW	8	(Greece) Andreas Stamatiadis
FW	9	(Greece) Giannis Chaniotis
FW	10	(Greece) Giannis Kanakis
FW	11	(Greece) Panagiotis Kourtidis
Manager:
(Greece) Kostas Negrepontis

GK	1	(Greece) Savvas Theodoridis
DF	2	(Greece) Ilias Rosidis (c)
DF	3	(Greece) Thanasis Kingley
MF	4	(Greece) Vasilis Xanthopoulos
MF	5	(Greece) Thanasis Bebis
MF	6	(Greece) Babis Kotridis
FW	7	(Greece) Themis Moustaklis
FW	8	(Greece) Giannis Ioannou
FW	9	(Greece) Elias Yfantis
FW	10	(Greece) Kostas Polychroniou
FW	11	(Greece) Georgios Darivas
Manager:
(Greece) Giannis Chelmis, (Greece) Vangelis Chelmis

Match rules

- 90 minutes
- 30 minutes of extra time if necessary
- Replay match if scores still level

== See also ==
- 1955–56 Greek Football Cup
