= 1954 Greek Football Cup final =

1954 Greek Cup final
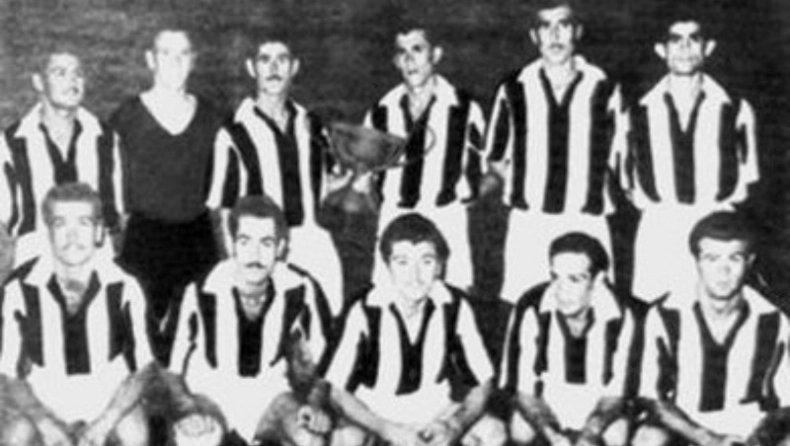
- Olympiacos after the final
- Event: 1953–54 Greek Football Cup
Olympiacos	Doxa Drama
2	0
- Date: 23 May 1954
- Venue: Leoforos Alexandras Stadium, Ampelokipoi, Athens
- Referee: Kostas Tzitzis (Athens)

The 1954 Greek Cup final was the 12th final of the Greek Cup. The match took place on 23 May 1954 at Leoforos Alexandras Stadium. The contesting teams were Olympiacos and Doxa Drama. It was Olympiacos' fifth Greek Cup final and fourth consecutive in their 29 years of existence and Doxa Drama's first ever Greek Cup final in their 36-year history.

== Venue ==
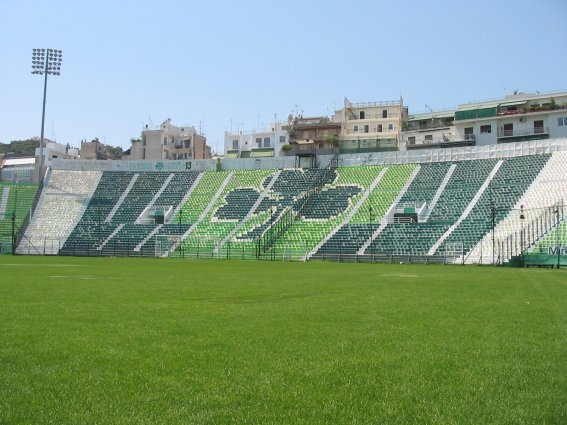
Leoforos Alexandras Stadium.

This was the eleventh Greek Cup final held at Leoforos Alexandras Stadium, after the 1932, 1939, 1940, 1947, 1948, 1949, 1950, 1951, 1952 and 1953 finals. (Leoforos also hosted the replay match of the 1933 final between Ethnikos Piraeus and Aris, the replay match of the 1949 final between AEK Athens and Panathinaikos and the replay match of the 1952 final between Olympiacos and Panionios).

Leoforos Alexandras Stadium was built in 1922. The stadium is used as a venue for Panathinaikos and Greece. Its current capacity is 30,000.

== Background ==
Olympiacos had reached the Greek Cup final four times, winning all of them. The last time that they played in a final was in 1953, where they had won AEK Athens by 3–2.

Doxa Drama had never competed in a Cup final.

The two teams had never met each other in a Cup final.

== Route to the final ==
Olympiacos				Round	Doxa Drama			
Opponent	Agg.	1st leg	2nd leg		Opponent	Agg.	1st leg	2nd leg
Bye				First round	Doxa Sitargon	6–0 (H)		
Bye				Second round	Megas Alexandros Drama	5–2 (H)		
Bye				Third round	Unknown			
Bye				Fourth round	Unknown			
Bye				Fifth round	Unknown			
Bye				Sixth round	Unknown			
Bye				Seventh round	Filippi Kavala	2–1 (H)		
Bye				Eighth round	Elpida Drama	7–0 (H)		
Bye				Ninth round	Unknown			
Bye				Tenth round	Doxa Alexandroupoli	Unknown		
Atromitos Piraeus	2–0 (A)			Round of 16	PAOK	3–2 (H)		
Asteras Athens	4–0 (A)			Quarter-finals	Aris	2–1 (A)		
Apollon Athens	2–1	1–1 (A)	1–0 (H)	Semi-finals	Iraklis	2–0 (w/o) (H)		

== Match ==
=== Details ===
23 May 1954
17:00 EET

Olympiacos	2–0	Doxa Drama
Drosos 31'; Darivas 38'	Report

Leoforos Alexandras Stadium, Ampelokipoi
Referee: Kostas Tzitzis (Athens)

GK	(Greece) Kostas Karapatis
DF	(Greece) Ilias Rosidis (c)
DF	(Greece) Vasilis Xanthopoulos
DF	(Greece) Babis Kotridis
DF	(Greece) Thanasis Kingley
MF	(Greece) Giannis Ioannou
MF	(Greece) Dimitrios Kokkinakis
FW	(Greece) Themis Moustaklis
FW	(Greece) Kostas Karpathakis
FW	(Greece) Georgios Darivas
FW	(Greece) Babis Drosos
Manager:
(Greece) Giannis Chelmis, (Greece) Vangelis Chelmis

GK	(Greece) Pavlos Boitaris
DF	(Greece) Giorgos Kotridis
DF	(Greece) Vasilis Similiotis
DF	(Greece) Thanasis Loukanidis
MF	(Greece) Tolios
MF	(Greece) Pistikos
MF	(Greece) Fanis Ignatiou
FW	(Greece) Karalazos
FW	(Greece) Antonis Georgiadis
FW	(Greece) Tokmakidis
FW	(Greece) Vasilis Ioannou
Manager:
(Greece) Panos Markovic

Assistant referees:
Stefanidis
Dimosthenis Stathatos (Athens)

Match rules

- 90 minutes
- 30 minutes of extra time if necessary
- Replay match if scores still level

== See also ==
- 1953–54 Greek Football Cup
