= 1954 FIFA World Cup qualification Group 10 =

Football tournament qualification stage

The three teams in this group played against each other on a home-and-away basis. The group winner Yugoslavia qualified for the 1954 FIFA World Cup held in Switzerland.

== Group 10 ==
Pos	Team	Pld	HW	HD	HL	HGF	HGA	AW	AD	AL	AGF	AGA	GD	Pts	Yugoslavia national football team	Greece national football team	Israel national football team
1	Yugoslavia	4	2	0	0	2	0	2	0	0	2	0	+4	8	—	1–0	1–0
2	Greece	4	1	0	1	1	1	1	0	1	2	1	+1	4	0–1	—	1–0
3	Israel	4	0	0	2	0	3	0	0	2	0	2	−5	0	0–1	0–2	—

== Results ==
9 May 1953	Yugoslavia	1 – 0	Greece	Belgrade, Yugoslavia
	Matošić 71'	Report		Referee: Steiner (Austria)

1 November 1953	Greece	1 – 0	Israel	Athens, Greece
	Bembis	Report		Referee: Massai (Italy)

8 November 1953	Yugoslavia	1 – 0	Israel	Skopje, Yugoslavia
	Milutinović	Report		Referee: Alsteen (Belgium)

8 March 1954	Israel	0 – 2	Greece	Tel Aviv, Israel
		Report	Kokkinakis; Kamaras	Referee: Buchmüller (Switzerland)

21 March 1954	Israel	0 – 1	Yugoslavia	Tel Aviv, Israel
		Report	Zebec	Referee: Leafe (England)

28 March 1954	Greece	0 – 1	Yugoslavia	Athens, Greece
		Report	Veselinović	Referee: Rufli (Switzerland)

== Team stats ==
=== Yugoslavia ===
Head coach: (Socialist Federal Republic of Yugoslavia) Milorad Arsenijević, (Socialist Federal Republic of Yugoslavia) Aleksandar Tirnanić, (Socialist Federal Republic of Yugoslavia) Leo Lemešić (together)

Pos.	Player	DoB	Games played	Goals	Minutes played	Sub off	Sub on	(Greece)	(Israel)	(Israel)	(Greece)	Club
GK	Vladimir Beara	November 2, 1928	2	0	180	0	0	90	90	-	-	(Socialist Federal Republic of Yugoslavia) Hajduk Split
DF	Bruno Belin	January 16, 1929	1	0	90	0	0	-	90	-	-	(Socialist Federal Republic of Yugoslavia) Partizan Belgrade
FW	Stjepan Bobek	December 3, 1923	2	0	180	0	0	-	90	90	-	(Socialist Federal Republic of Yugoslavia) Partizan Belgrade
MF	Vujadin Boškov	May 16, 1931	4	0	360	0	0	90	90	90	90	(Socialist Federal Republic of Yugoslavia) Vojvodina Novi Sad
MF	Zlatko Čajkovski	November 24, 1923	4	0	360	0	0	90	90	90	90	(Socialist Federal Republic of Yugoslavia) Partizan Belgrade
DF	Tomislav Crnković	June 17, 1929	2	0	180	0	0	90	-	90	-	(Socialist Federal Republic of Yugoslavia) Dinamo Zagreb
DF	Ivan Horvat	July 16, 1926	3	0	270	0	0	90	-	90	90	(Socialist Federal Republic of Yugoslavia) Dinamo Zagreb
FW	Frane Matošić	November 25, 1918	1	1	90	0	0	90	-	-	-	(Socialist Federal Republic of Yugoslavia) Hajduk Split
MF	Sima Milovanov	April 10, 1923	1	0	90	0	0	-	90	-	-	(Socialist Federal Republic of Yugoslavia) Vojvodina Novi Sad
FW	Miloš Milutinović	February 5, 1933	3	1	218	1	0	-	90	38	90	(Socialist Federal Republic of Yugoslavia) Partizan Belgrade
MF	Rajko Mitić	November 6, 1922	3	0	270	0	0	90	-	90	90	(Socialist Federal Republic of Yugoslavia) Red Star Belgrade
DF	Tihomir Ognjanov	March 2, 1927	1	0	52	0	1	-	-	52	-	(Socialist Federal Republic of Yugoslavia) Red Star Belgrade
MF	Zdravko Rajkov	December 5, 1927	4	0	360	0	0	90	90	90	90	(Socialist Federal Republic of Yugoslavia) Vojvodina Novi Sad
DF	Branko Stanković	October 31, 1921	3	0	270	0	0	90	-	90	90	(Socialist Federal Republic of Yugoslavia) Red Star Belgrade
GK	Slavko Stojanović	June 1, 1930	2	0	180	0	0	-	-	90	90	(Socialist Federal Republic of Yugoslavia) Partizan Belgrade
FW	Todor Veselinović	October 22, 1930	1	1	90	0	0	-	-	-	90	(Socialist Federal Republic of Yugoslavia) Vojvodina Novi Sad
FW	Bernard Vukas	May 1, 1927	2	0	180	0	0	90	90	-	-	(Socialist Federal Republic of Yugoslavia) Hajduk Split
MF	Branko Zebec	May 17, 1929	4	1	360	0	0	90	90	90	90	(Socialist Federal Republic of Yugoslavia) Partizan Belgrade
DF	Milan Zeković	November 15, 1925	2	0	180	0	0	-	90	-	90	(Socialist Federal Republic of Yugoslavia) Red Star Belgrade

=== Greece ===
Head coach: (Greece) Kostas Negrepontis (first and second match), (Greece) Ioannis Chelmis (third and fourth match)

Pos.	Player	DoB	Games played	Goals	Minutes played	Sub off	Sub on	(Socialist Federal Republic of Yugoslavia)	(Israel)	(Israel)	(Socialist Federal Republic of Yugoslavia)	Club
DF	Theodoros Aloupis	December 14, 1929	1	0	90	0	0	90	-	-	-	(Greece) Panathinaikos
MF	Thanasis Bebis	June 26, 1928	2	1	180	0	0	90	90	-	-	(Greece) Olympiacos
FW	Georgios Darivas	March 12, 1926	1	0	41	1	0	-	41	-	-	(Greece) Olympiacos
MF	Babis Drosos	1928	2	0	180	0	0	90	90	-	-	(Greece) Olympiacos
MF	Pavlos Emmanouilidis	1929	2	0	180	0	0	90	90	-	-	(Greece) AEK Athens
MF	Ioannis Ioannou	1931	1	0	90	0	0	90	-	-	-	(Greece) Olympiacos
FW	Georgios Kamaras	1931	2	1	180	0	0	-	-	90	90	(Greece) Apollon Smyrnis F.C.
MF	Dimitris Kokkinakis	1930	2	1	180	0	0	-	-	90	90	(Greece) Olympiacos
MF	Babis Kotridis	1928	2	0	180	0	0	-	-	90	90	(Greece) Olympiacos
DF	Georgios Kourtzidis	1931	2	0	180	0	0	-	-	90	90	(Greece) Panathinaikos
DF	Kostas Linoxilakis	March 5, 1933	2	0	180	0	0	-	-	90	90	(Greece) Panathinaikos
GK	Stathis Mantalozis		2	0	180	0	0	90	90	-	-	(Greece) Ethnikos Piraeus
DF	Giorgos Mouratidis	1927	1	0	50	0	1	-	-	-	50	(Greece) AEK Athens
DF	Andreas Mouratis	November 29, 1926	1	0	90	0	0	-	90	-	-	(Greece) Olympiacos
FW	Ioannis Nembidis	March 10, 1928	2	0	180	0	0	90	90	-	-	(Greece) Panathinaikos
FW	Vangelis Panakis	June 8, 1933	2	0	180	0	0	-	-	90	90	(Greece) Panathinaikos
FW	Giannis Papantoniou		2	0	180	0	0	-	-	90	90	(Greece) Panathinaikos
MF	Ilias Papageorgiou	1925	1	0	90	0	0	90	-	-	-	(Greece) AEK Athens
MF	Lakis Petropoulos	August 29, 1932	1	0	90	0	0	-	90	-	-	(Greece) Panathinaikos
DF	Kostas Poulis	1928	1	0	90	0	0	-	90	-	-	(Greece) AEK Athens
DF	Ilias Rosidis	February 3, 1927	4	0	360	0	0	90	90	90	90	(Greece) Olympiacos
MF	Lambis Serafeidis		2	0	139	0	1	90	49	-	-	(Greece) Apollon Athens
DF	Thanasis Kingley		2	0	180	0	0	90	90	-	-	(Greece) Olympiacos
MF	Andreas Stamatiadis	August 16, 1935	2	0	180	0	0	-	-	90	90	(Greece) AEK Athens
GK	Babis Taouxis	1930	2	0	180	0	0	-	-	90	90	(Greece) Apollon Athens
DF	Vasilis Xanthopoulos	1929	2	0	130	1	0	-	-	90	40	(Greece) Olympiacos F.C.
