= Antonis Papantoniou =

Greek footballer

Personal information
- Date of birth: 1924
- Position: Forward

Senior career*
Years	Team	Apps	(Gls)
1946–1950	Panathinaikos		

International career
1949	Greece	1	(3)
- * Club domestic league appearances and goals

Antonis Papantoniou (Greek: Αντώνης Παπαντωνίου; 1924 – unknown) was a Greek footballer who played for Panathinaikos between 1946 and 1950. He featured once for the Greece national football team in 1949, scoring a hat-trick against Syria. He was the brother of fellow Greek international footballer Giannis Papantoniou.

== Career statistics ==
=== International ===
Appearances and goals by national team and year
National team	Year	Apps	Goals
Greece	1949	1	3
Total		1	3

=== International goals ===
Scores and results list Greece's goal tally first, score column indicates score after each Greece goal.

List of international goals scored by Antonis Papantoniou
No.	Date	Venue	Opponent	Score	Result	Competition
1	25 November 1949	Leoforos Alexandras Stadium, Athens, Greece	Syria	1–0	8–0	Friendly
2	25 November 1949	Leoforos Alexandras Stadium, Athens, Greece	Syria	2–0	8–0	Friendly
3	25 November 1949	Leoforos Alexandras Stadium, Athens, Greece	Syria	5–0	8–0	Friendly
