= Thanasis Bebis =

Greek footballer (1928–2017)

Personal information
- Full name: Athanasios Bebis
- Date of birth: 26 June 1928
- Place of birth: Votanikos, Greece
- Date of death: 23 July 2017 (aged 89)
- Height: 1.65 m (5 ft 5 in)
- Position: Midfielder

Youth career
- 1943–1945: Prasina Poulia
- 1945: Enosi Agiou Andrea
- 1945–1947: Akratitos

Senior career*
Years	Team	Apps	(Gls)
1947–1948	Fostiras		
1948–1953	Olympiacos		
1953–1954	Akratitos		
1954–1963	Olympiacos		
1963–1965	Vyzas Megara		
1965–1966	Argonaftis Piraeus		

International career
1950–1959	Greece	17	(1)
1952–1960	Greece Olympic	2	(0)

Managerial career
- 1959: Vyzas Megara
- 1968–1969: Vyzas Megara
- 1969: Olympiacos (caretaker)
- 1969–1970: Vyzas Megara
- 1970: Koropi
- 1983: Olympiacos (caretaker)
- 1984: Olympiacos (caretaker)
- 1985: Olympiacos (caretaker)
- 1987: Korinthos
- * Club domestic league appearances and goals

Thanasis Bebis (Greek: Θανάσης Μπέμπης; 26 June 1928 – 23 July 2017) was a Greek professional footballer who played as a midfielder. He is deeply connected to Olympiacos, where he spent most of his career and won 24 titles. He made 17 appearances for the Greece national team scoring one goal. He was given the nickname "Pinocchio" as he deceived the opposite defences with his dribbling skills and moves with the ball.

== Club career ==
Bebis was born on 26 June 1928 in Votanikos, and during the German occupation he started playing football in Prasina Poulia of Petralona. After a move to the neighboring teams Enosi Agiou Andrea and Akratitos, the young Athenian joined the roster of Fostiras at the age of 19. On 12 July 1948, he signed a letter stating: "I declare that I will be a loyal follower of him and I will never leave my favorite club Fostiras". Later, however, he accused the management of his team of forgery, revoked his declaration of allegiance and the case ended up in the courts without any outcome.

In 1948 he transferred to Olympiacos, but he had to wait 2 years to take part in official obligations, his previous club had not agreed to the transfer, thus imposing the usual exclusion for the time. His unofficial debut was recorded on 10 August 1949 and specifically in the evening friendly match with French Nice in a 1–1 draw at Leoforos Alexandras Stadium. The 1949-50 season took more games, as he played in 19 friendly matches and scored 9 goals, the first of which on 30 November 1949 against Daphni Metaxourgiou. Bebis, in fact, was the successor of Giannis Vazos, in the sense that he started recording participations with Olympiacos jersey the year that the later retired. Of course, the two club legends played in different positions. The young ace of the "red and whites" opened his scoring account in a derby with AEK for the Christmas Cup on 27 December 1949 at Leoforos Alexandras Stadium, scoring the only goal in the 90th minute winning the game. His official debut took place against Panionios and he scored the goal that gave the victory to his team with 1-0. "Pinocchio" celebrated 6 Championships, 9 Cups and 8 Piraeus' Championships. In combination with the Balkans Cup of 1963, Bebis recorded 24 titles, which only Rosidis, Kotridis and Darivas could surpass. Of course, "Pinocchio" lost that of 1954, since due to financial differences he returned for one season to Akratitos. During this season he also scored with the Athens All Stars in a 2-2 draw against Thessaloniki All Stars for the City Cup. The first match after his return to Olympiacos took place on 28 July 1954 and specifically in the friendly 1-0 victory over Galatasaray in Athens. Regarding the famous Balkan Cup of 1963, in its last season, "Pinocchio" played in the first match of the group with the Steagul Brașov and in the second final with Levski Sofia. He achieved of 207 appearances (152 in the championship, 53 in the Cup, 2 in the Champions League) and 41 goals (28 in the league, 13 in the Cup) for Olympiacos.

Bebis was transferred at Vyzas Megara in the 1963-64 season, without, achieving the goal of promotion to the First Division. He retired after a 2-year spell at Argonaftis Piraeus.

== International career ==
Bebis wore Greece's jersey 17 times from 1950 to 1959, starting with the match with Egypt on 17 February for the Friendship Cup of Eastern Mediterranean playing in the 2nd half. He was part of the insurgency that occurred in November 1953 in the representative team where the players refused to play in matches against Israel. As Bebis later said: "In order to prepare with the National team, we had lost our day jobs. We were promised, if I recall correctly, 800–1000 drachmas. They did not give them to us and we reacted not by leaving the team, but by going to another hotel alone, away from those in charge. We did not do it for the money. It was a glory and an honor to play for the National team. Pricks ruled the Federation and our reaction was aimed at them." Finally, after assurances, the team of Kostas Negrepontis normally participated in the match for the qualifying round of the 1954 World Cup and won with a goal by Bebis in the 52nd minute. The last international appearance with Greece took place on 15 November 1959 in an away defeat with 4-0 by Yugoslavia for the pre-Olympic tournament of 1960. He also competed in the men's tournament at the 1952 Summer Olympics.

== Style of play ==
He was short, slender, incredibly active, he usually dribbled with his head held high, he was usually referred to as a classic "number 10". Initially, he played as an attacking midfielder, but as the years went by, he became a central midfielder. He was a football genius in that his playing style is reminiscent of players like Raymond Kopa and Lionel Messi. His control and pass were smart, he controlled the rhythm of the game, while his most spectacular skill was daft dribbles or "tunnels" to the opponents. The most important disadvantage was of course, the headers, in contrast to his scoring skills despite not being a pure striker. When Bebis was running, a still tuft stood out as an extension of the back of his head, a trademark of his outward appearance, in combination of course with the little boy. He generally liked to dodge opponents with dribbles and tricks, he was cunning and sloppy whenever he needed to be, but in some cases he was vindictive. Bebis used to say about his famous dribbles: "Even before the opponent gets too close to me, I have made sure that I will kick the ball in the opposite direction from what I am thinking. So the other one is tricked, moves sideways and the dribbling starts. The opponent is not that stupid. He quickly finds his composure and tries to block my way. But I trick him again, passing the ball under my feet, pushing it sideways with the inside of my left foot. Immediately after, I turn my body sideways, forcing the opponent to either lose his balance, or try to tackle me, which, I always anticipate and always avoid. The decisive point of the dribble: the opponent must be so fooled that… he is looking for the ball behind me. Whenever I do that, my dribble is considered successful." His playing skills were praised by friends and "enemies". His nickname, "Pinocchio" probably came from the Greek Cypriot poet and journalist Pavlos Krinaios.

== Managerial career ==
After his playing days were over Bebis returned as a coach to Olympiacos for 4 occasions, as a caretaker manager. Specifically, from 10 May to 15 June 1969 he managed 6 victories, from 3 May to 17 February 1980 he recorded 1 win and 2 draws which included a lost cup final. On 27 November 1983 the victory came with 5-0 against Egaleo, while from 18 March to 6 May 1984 he achieved 5 wins and 1 draw. Finally, Bebis recorded 3 wins and 2 draws from 5 May to 16 June 1985, completing his spell with a total of 16 wins, 5 draws and no defeats. In addition, he worked as a manager at Vyzas Megara in the seasons 1968–69, 1969–70 and in Korinthos for 2 matches of the 1987–88 season. In May 1970 he served at Koropi as a temporary replacement for the manager, Georgios Darivas.

== Death ==
"Pinocchio" died at the age of 89 and took with him another huge part of the romantic era of Greek football. The moment he kneels and kisses the flag of Olympiacos will forever be engraved in the memory of his fans. Mimis Domazos, legendary figure of the rival Panathinaikos posted on the social media "From a young age I admired and respected him. I remember when we played opponents in the last games of his career. Have a good trip Thanasis. "' Domazos, like many non-Olympians, recognized even after his death the value of that great player who "left" on 23 July 2017.

== Honours ==
Olympiacos

- Panhellenic Championship: 1950–51, 1954–55, 1955–56, 1956–57, 1957–58, 1958–59
- Greek Cup: 1950–51, 1951–52, 1952–53, 1956–57, 1957–58, 1958–59, 1959–60, 1960–61, 1962–63
- Piraeus FCA League: 1951, 1952, 1953, 1955, 1956, 1957, 1958, 1959
- Balkans Cup: 1963

Individual

- Panhellenic Championship top scorer: 1950–51
