= Theodoros Aloupis =

Greek footballer

Personal information
- Date of birth: 14 December 1929
- Date of death: 5 November 2018 (aged 88)
- Position: Defender

International career
Years	Team	Apps	(Gls)
1953	Greece	1	(0)

Theodoros Aloupis (14 December 1929 – 5 November 2018) was a Greek footballer. He played in one match for the Greece national football team in 1953. He was also part of Greece team for their qualification matches for the 1954 FIFA World Cup.
