= Xanthi Football Clubs Association =

Association football governing body in Xanthi Prefecture, Greece

- Full name: Xanthi Football Clubs Association; Greek: Ένωση Ποδοσφαιρικών Σωματείων Ξάνθης
- Short name: Xanthi F.C.A.; Greek: Ε.Π.Σ. Ξάνθης
- Founded: 1978; 48 years ago
- Headquarters: Xanthi, Greece
- FIFA affiliation: Hellenic Football Federation
- President: Ioannis Dalakouras
- Website: epsxanthis.gr

Xanthi Football Clubs Association (Greek: Ένωση Ποδοσφαιρικών Σωματείων Ξάνθης) is a association football organization in Xanthi Prefecture that is member of the Hellenic Football Federation. The champions of the Xanthi FCA are promoted to the Gamma Ethniki, while the cup winner will play in the Greek Amateur Cup.

== History ==
The Xanthi Football Clubs Association was established in 1978, following the separation of the clubs from Xanthi Regional Unit from the Thrace Football Clubs Association.

== League ==
The structure of the Xanthi FCA local championships is as follows:

- **A Category** (First Tier)
- **B Category** (Second Tier)
- **C Category** (Third Tier)

=== Championships ===
| Season | Champion |
|---|---|
| 1978–79 | Atromitos Chrysa |
| 1979–80 | Atromitos Chrysa |
| 1980–81 | Kessani Erasmio |
| 1981–82 | Ermis Mandra |
| 1982–83 | Elpis Genisea |
| 1983–84 | Atromitos Chrysa |
| 1984–85 | Elpis Genisea |
| 1985–86 | Pavlos Melas Koutsou |
| 1986–87 | Elpis Genisea |
| 1987–88 | Aspis Xanthi |
| 1988–89 | Kessani Erasmio |
| 1989–90 | Elpis Genisea |
| 1990–91 | Aspis Pigadia |
| 1991–92 | Diagoras Nea Kessani |
| 1992–93 | Orfeas Xanthi |
| 1993–94 | Diagoras Nea Kessani |
| 1994–95 | B-52 Genisea |
| 1995–96 | APOX Xanthi |
| 1996–97 | Orfeas Xanthi |
| 1997–98 | APOX Xanthi |
| 1998–99 | Keravnos Lefkopetra |
| 1999–00 | Anagennisi Thalassia |
| 2000–01 | Orfeas Xanthi |
| 2001–02 | Orfeas Xanthi |
| 2002–03 | Doxa Xanthi |
| 2003–04 | Orfeas Xanthi |
| 2004–05 | Apollon Diomideia |
| 2005–06 | APOX Skoda |
| 2006–07 | APOX Skoda |
| 2007–08 | Echinos Sport |
| 2008–09 | APOX Skoda |
| 2009–10 | AE Pontion Evmiro |
| 2010–11 | Iraklis Neos Zygos |
| 2011–12 | Asteras Magiko |
| 2012–13 | Orfeas Xanthi |
| 2013–14 | Aris Avato |
| 2014–15 | Aris Avato |
| 2015–16 | Orfeas Xanthi |
| 2016–17 | Aris Avato |
| 2017–18 | Aspis Xanthi |
| 2018–19 | Iraklis Neos Zygos |
| 2019–20 | Anagennisi Thalassia |
| 2020–21 | Abandoned due to COVID-19 pandemic |
| 2021–22 | Aris Peteino |
| 2022–23 | Aris Peteino |
| 2023–24 | Pavlos Melas Koutsou |
| 2024–25 | AO Xanthi |
| 2025–26 | Pavlos Melas Koutsou |

Source: EPS Xanthi

=== Performance by club ===
| Club | Titles | Season |
|---|---|---|
| Orfeas Xanthi | 7 | 1993, 1997, 2001, 2002, 2004, 2013, 2016 |
| Elpis Genisea | 4 | 1983, 1985, 1987, 1990 |
| Atromitos Chrysa | 3 | 1979, 1980, 1984 |
| APOX Xanthi / APOX Skoda | 3 | 1996, 1998, 2006, 2007, 2009 |
| Aris Avato | 3 | 2014, 2015, 2017 |
| Pavlos Melas Koutsou | 3 | 1986, 2024, 2026 |
| Kessani Erasmio | 2 | 1981, 1989 |
| Diagoras Nea Kessani | 2 | 1992, 1994 |
| Anagennisi Thalassia | 2 | 2000, 2020 |
| Aspis Xanthi | 2 | 1988, 2018 |
| Iraklis Neos Zygos | 2 | 2011, 2019 |
| Aris Peteino | 2 | 2022, 2023 |
| Ermis Mandra | 1 | 1982 |
| Aspis Pigadia | 1 | 1991 |
| B-52 Genisea | 1 | 1995 |
| Keravnos Lefkopetra | 1 | 1999 |
| Doxa Xanthi | 1 | 2003 |
| Apollon Diomideia | 1 | 2005 |
| Echinos Sport | 1 | 2008 |
| AE Pontion Evmiro | 1 | 2010 |
| Asteras Magiko | 1 | 2012 |
| AO Xanthi | 1 | 2025 |

== Cup ==
=== Cup Winners ===
| Season | Winner |
|---|---|
| 1978–79 | Aspis Xanthi |
| 1979–80 | Aspis Xanthi |
| 1980–81 | Aspis Xanthi |
| 1981–82 | Aspis Xanthi |
| 1982–83 | Ermis Mandra |
| 1983–84 | Atromitos Chrysa |
| 1984–85 | Keravnos Lefkopetra |
| 1985–86 | Atromitos Chrysa |
| 1986–87 | Elpis Genisea |
| 1987–88 | Kessani Erasmio |
| 1988–89 | Aspis Xanthi |
| 1989–90 | A.O. Xanthi (Amateurs) |
| 1990–91 | Elpis Genisea |
| 1991–92 | Aspis Xanthi |
| 1992–93 | B-52 Genisea |
| 1993–94 | B-52 Genisea |
| 1994–95 | Dimokritos Avdira |
| 1995–96 | B-52 Genisea |
| 1996–97 | APOX |
| 1997–98 | Orfeas Xanthi |
| 1998–99 | Orfeas Xanthi |
| 1999–00 | Doxa Xanthi |
| 2000–01 | Doxa Xanthi |
| 2001–02 | Aspis Xanthi |
| 2002–03 | Orfeas Xanthi |
| 2003–04 | Orfeas Xanthi |
| 2004–05 | Doxa Xanthi |
| 2005–06 | Echinos Sport |
| 2006–07 | Orfeas Xanthi |
| 2007–08 | AO Vistonida |
| 2008–09 | Orfeas Xanthi |
| 2009–10 | Orfeas Xanthi |
| 2010–11 | Orfeas Xanthi |
| 2011–12 | Orfeas Xanthi |
| 2012–13 | Pavlos Melas Koutsou |
| 2013–14 | Pavlos Melas Koutsou |
| 2014–15 | Iraklis Neos Zygos |
| 2015–16 | Anagennisi Thalassia |
| 2016–17 | Aris Avato |
| 2017–18 | Aris Avato |
| 2018–19 | Orfeas Xanthi |
| 2019–20 | Orfeas Xanthi |
| 2020–21 | Abandoned due to COVID-19 pandemic |
| 2021–22 | Aris Peteino |
| 2022–23 | Orfeas Xanthi |
| 2023–24 | Aris Avato |
| 2024–25 | Aris Avato |
| 2025–26 | Pavlos Melas Koutsou |

Source: EPS Xanthi

=== Performance by club ===
| Club | Titles | Season |
|---|---|---|
| Orfeas Xanthi | 12 | 1998, 1999, 2003, 2004, 2007, 2009, 2010, 2011, 2012, 2019, 2020, 2023 |
| Aspis Xanthi | 7 | 1979, 1980, 1981, 1982, 1989, 1992, 2002 |
| Aris Avato | 4 | 2017, 2018, 2024, 2025 |
| B-52 Genisea | 3 | 1993, 1994, 1996 |
| Doxa Xanthi | 3 | 2000, 2001, 2005 |
| Pavlos Melas Koutsou | 3 | 2013, 2014, 2026 |
| Atromitos Chrysa | 2 | 1984, 1986 |
| Elpis Genisea | 2 | 1987, 1991 |
| Ermis Mandra | 1 | 1983 |
| Keravnos Lefkopetra | 1 | 1985 |
| Kessani Erasmio | 1 | 1988 |
| A.O. Xanthi (Amateurs) | 1 | 1990 |
| Dimokritos Avdira | 1 | 1995 |
| APOX | 1 | 1997 |
| Echinos Sport | 1 | 2006 |
| AO Vistonida | 1 | 2008 |
| Iraklis Neos Zygos | 1 | 2015 |
| Anagennisi Thalassia | 1 | 2016 |
| Aris Peteino | 1 | 2022 |

== Emblem ==
The emblem of the Xanthi Football Clubs Association features the bust of Democritus.

== Teams in national divisions ==
Two teams participate in national divisions in the 2026–27 season :

- Gamma Ethniki:
  - A.E. Thraki
  - Xanthi
