= Ilias Rosidis =

Greek footballer (1927–2019)

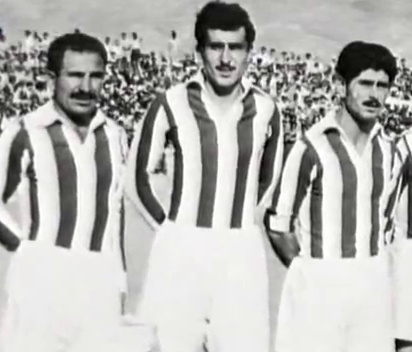
- Image of Mouratis, Kotridis and Rosidis

Personal information
- Full name: Ilias Rosidis
- Date of birth: 3 February 1927
- Place of birth: Neo Faliro, Piraeus, Greece
- Date of death: 27 December 2019 (aged 92)
- Position: Right back

Senior career*
Years	Team	Apps	(Gls)
1948–1961	Olympiacos	143	(1)
1962–1964	Vyzas Megara		

International career
1951–1960	Greece	29	(0)
1960	Greece Olympic	5	(0)

Managerial career
- 1969: Triglia Rafinas
- * Club domestic league appearances and goals

Ilias Rosidis (Greek: Ηλίας Ρωσίδης; 3 February 1927 – 27 December 2019) was a Greek footballer who played for Olympiacos and Greece throughout his career.

== Club career ==
A talented right back, Rosidis is considered a legend amongst the Olympiacos faithful. During a career that spanned almost 20 years at the Piraeus club, Rosidis captained the club during their golden era of the 1950s. From 1954 to 1959, Rosidis led the club to a then unheard of six consecutive Greek Championships. In that same period, Rosidis lifted the Greek Cup on 3 occasions, making Olympiacos the only Greek club to have won 3 consecutive doubles. In total, Rosidis finished his Olympiacos' career with 7 Greek Championships, 9 Cups, 5 doubles, and over 500 appearances for his club.

== International career ==
During the 1950s, Rosidis was a key member in the Greece national football team. He earned 29 caps during this time period. Rossidis played for Greece at the 1952 Summer Olympics. In 2012 Rosidis carried the London 2012 Olympic torch and lit the cauldron in Piraeus the day before it was handed over to London.

== Honours ==
Olympiacos

- Panhellenic Championship: 1950–51, 1953–54, 1954–55, 1955–56, 1956–57, 1957–58, 1958–59
- Greek Cup: 1950–51, 1951–52, 1952–53, 1953–54, 1956–57, 1957–58, 1958–59, 1959–60, 1960–61
