= Giorgos Mouratidis =

Greek footballer

Personal information
- Full name: Georgios Mouratidis
- Date of birth: 1927
- Place of birth: Thessaloniki, Greece
- Date of death: 30 April 2013 (aged 85–86)
- Place of death: Greece
- Positions: Midfielder; forward

Senior career*
Years	Team	Apps	(Gls)
1945−1947	Apollon Kalamarias		
1947−1951	PAOK		
1951−1955	AEK Athens	8	(0)

International career
1952	Greece Military		
1948–1954	Greece	8	(0)
- * Club domestic league appearances and goals

Giorgos Mouratidis (Greek: Γιώργος Μουρατίδης) 1927 – 30 April 2013) was a Greek professional footballer who played as a midfielder.

== Club career ==
Mouratidis started his career in 1945 at Apollon Kalamarias. In 1947 he moved to PAOK alongside Karpozilos and Konstantinidis. With PAOK he won 2 Macedonia FCA Championships. He played there until 1951, when he was transferred to AEK Athens, where he retired from 1955.

One of the greatest moments of his career was the 4 goals he scored in a cup match against Aris.

== International career ==
Mouratidis played with Greece, having 8 appearances between 1948 and 1954. He made 6 appearances when he was playing for PAOK and the rest as player of AEK Athens. He was also part of Greece's team for their qualification matches for the 1954 FIFA World Cup. He also played with the military team and won the World Military Cup in 1952.

== Honours ==
PAOK

- Macedonia FCA Championship: 1948, 1950

Greece military

- World Military Cup: 1952
