= Aris Peteino F.C. =

Aris Peteinos
- Full name: M.A.S. Aris Peteinos Football Club
- Founded: 1948; 78 years ago
- Ground: Stadium of Peteinos
- Manager: Anastasios Neofytidis
- League: Xanthi FCA Second Division
- 2025–26: Xanthi FCA Second Division (Group 2), 2nd

Aris Peteinos Football Club (Greek: Μορφωτικός Αθλητικός Σύλλογος Άρης Πετεινού) is a Greek football club based in Peteinos, Xanthi, Greece.

== Honours ==
=== Domestic ===
  - Xanthi FCA Champions: 2
    - 2021–22, 2022–23
  - Xanthi FCA Cup Winners: 1
    - 2021-22
