= Georgios Kourtzidis =

Greek footballer

Personal information
- Date of birth: 11 November 1929

International career
Years	Team	Apps	(Gls)
1954–1956	Greece	8	(0)

Georgios Kourtzidis (born 11 November 1929) was a Greek footballer. He played in eight matches for the Greece national football team from 1954 to 1956. He was also part of Greece's team for their qualification matches for the 1954 FIFA World Cup.
