= Stathis Mantalozis =

Greek footballer

Personal information
- Date of birth: 1 January 1928
- Date of death: 2 November 1993 (aged 65)
- Position: Goalkeeper

Senior career*
Years	Team	Apps	(Gls)
1943–1959	Ethnikos O.F. Piraeus Falirou		

International career
1953–1957	Greece	10	(0)
- * Club domestic league appearances and goals

Stathis Mantalozis (1 January 1928 – 2 November 1993) was a Greek footballer who played as a goalkeeper. He made ten appearances for the Greece national team from 1953 to 1957. He was also part of Greece's team for their qualification matches for the 1954 FIFA World Cup. He played for Ethnikos Piraeus for 16 years.
