= Savvas Theodoridis =

Greek footballer (1935–2020)

Personal information
- Date of birth: 18 February 1935
- Place of birth: Athens, Greece
- Date of death: 17 August 2020 (aged 85)
- Position: Goalkeeper

Youth career
- –1953: AE Ampelokipi

Senior career*
Years	Team	Apps	(Gls)
1953–1962	Olympiacos	57	(0)
Total		57	(0)

International career
1960	Greece Olympic	4	(0)
1957–1960	Greece	12	(0)
- * Club domestic league appearances and goals

Savvas Theodoridis (Greek: Σάββας Θεοδωρίδης; 18 February 1935 – 17 August 2020) was a Greek football player who played as a goalkeeper for Olympiacos and the Greece national team. He was also a member of the Olympic team that participated in the qualification games for the 1960 Summer Olympics, where Greece finished last in their respective group, playing in all four games.

== Honours ==
Olympiacos

- Panhellenic Championship: 1954–55, 1955–56, 1956–57, 1957–58, 1958–59
- Greek Cup: 1956–57, 1957–58, 1958–59, 1959–60, 1960–61
- Piraeus FCA Championship: 1954, 1955, 1957, 1958, 1959
