= 1955 Greek Football Cup final =

1955 Greek Cup final
- Event: 1954–55 Greek Football Cup
Panathinaikos	PAOK
2	0
- Date: 12 June 1955
- Venue: Leoforos Alexandras Stadium, Ampelokipoi, Athens
- Referee: Vasilis Diamandopoulos (Athens)
- Attendance: 6,729

The 1955 Greek Cup final was the 13th final of the Greek Cup. The match took place on 12 June 1955 at Leoforos Alexandras Stadium. The contesting teams were Panathinaikos and PAOK. It was Panathinaikos' fourth Greek Cup final in their 47 years of existence and PAOK's third Greek Cup final in their 29-year history.

== Venue ==
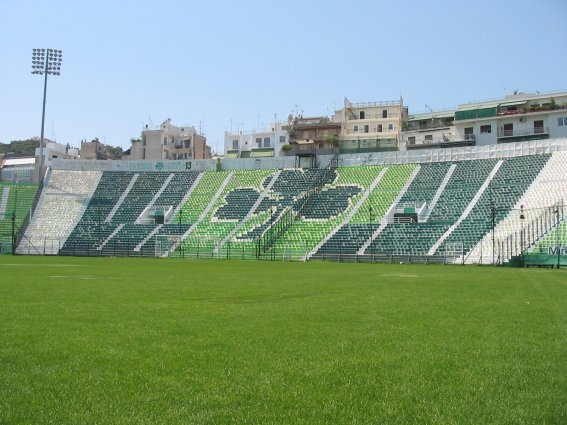
Leoforos Alexandras Stadium.

This was the twelfth Greek Cup final held at Leoforos Alexandras Stadium, after the 1932, 1939, 1940, 1947, 1948, 1949, 1950, 1951, 1952, 1953 and 1954 finals. (Leoforos also hosted the replay match of the 1933 final between Ethnikos Piraeus and Aris, the replay match of the 1949 final between AEK Athens and Panathinaikos and the replay match of the 1952 final between Olympiacos and Panionios).

Leoforos Alexandras Stadium was built in 1922. The stadium is used as a venue for Panathinaikos and Greece. Its current capacity is 30,000.

== Background ==
Panathinaikos had reached the Greek Cup final three times, winning two of them. The last time that they had won the Cup was in 1948 (2–1 against AEK Athens). The last time that had played in a final was in 1949, where they had lost to AEK Athens by 2–1 in a replay match, after the 0–0 of the initial match.

PAOK had reached the Greek Cup final two times. The last time that they played in a final was in 1951, where they had lost to Olympiacos by 4–0.

The two teams had never met each other in a Cup final.

== Route to the final ==
Panathinaikos		Round	PAOK	
Opponent	Result		Opponent	Result
Asteras Athens	1–0 (H)	Round of 32	Makedonikos	2–0 (H)
OFI	2–1 (A)	Round of 16	Elpida Drama	3–2 (a.e.t.) (H)
Aris	1–0 (H)	Quarter-finals	Panionios	4–2 (A)
Apollon Athens	2–1 (H)	Semi-finals	Doxa Drama	1–0 (H)

== Match ==
=== Details ===
12 June 1955
17:00 EET

Panathinaikos	2–0	PAOK
Kourtzidis 24'; Panakis 31'	Report

Leoforos Alexandras Stadium, Ampelokipoi
Attendance: 6,729
Referee: Vasilis Diamandopoulos (Athens)

GK	(Greece) Markos Chalaris
DF	(Greece) Sotiris Angelopoulos
DF	(Greece) Giorgos Kourtzidis
DF	(Greece) Dimitris Kazakos
DF	(Greece) Kostas Linoxilakis (c)
MF	(Greece) Ioannis Nembidis
MF	(Greece) Filippos Asimakopoulos
FW	(Greece) Giorgos Foteinos
FW	(Greece) Giorgos Ziemis
FW	(Greece) Lakis Petropoulos (red card) 53'
FW	(Greece) Vangelis Panakis
Manager:
(Socialist Federal Republic of Yugoslavia) Svetislav Glišović

GK	(Greece) Apostolos Progios
DF	(Greece) Antonis Kemanidis
DF	(Greece) Vasilis Geroudis
DF	(Greece) Dimitris Kalogiannis
MF	(Greece) Giorgos Chasiotis
MF	(Greece) Christos Doukakis (red card) 53'
MF	(Greece) Notis Tsintoglou
FW	(Greece) Vangelis Karafoulidis
FW	(Greece) Christoforos Yientzis
FW	(Greece) Lefteris Papadakis
FW	(Greece) Kostas Kiourtzis
Manager:
(Greece) Nikos Pangalos

Assistant referees:
Sotiropoulos
Giannis Daskalakis (Piraeus)

Match rules

- 90 minutes
- 30 minutes of extra time if necessary
- Replay match if scores still level

== See also ==
- 1954–55 Greek Football Cup
