= Babis Taouxis =

Greek footballer

Personal information
- Date of birth: 1930
- Date of death: 2006 (aged 75–76)

International career
Years	Team	Apps	(Gls)
1954–1955	Greece	3	(0)

Babis Taouxis (1930 – 2006) was a Greek footballer. He played in three matches for the Greece national football team from 1954 to 1955. He was also part of Greece's team for their qualification matches for the 1954 FIFA World Cup.
