= 1956–57 Greek Football Cup =

1956–57 Greek Cup
Tournament details
- Country: Greece

Final positions
- Champions: Olympiacos (6th title)
- Runners-up: Iraklis

Tournament statistics
- Top goal scorer(s): Andreas Stamatiadis (8 goals)

The 1956–57 Greek Football Cup was the 15th edition of the Greek Football Cup. The competition culminated with the Greek Cup Final, held at Karaiskakis Stadium, on 29 July 1957. The match was contested by Olympiacos and Iraklis, with Olympiacos winning by 2–0.

== Calendar ==
From Round of 32 onwards:

Round	Date(s)	Fixtures	Clubs	New entries
Round of 32	23 June 1957	14	32 → 16	none
Round of 16	21 July 1957	9	16 → 8	none
Quarter-finals	25 August 1957	4	8 → 4	none
Semi-finals	1957	2	4 → 2	none
Final	8 September 1957	1	2 → 1	none

== Knockout phase ==
In the knockout phase, teams play against each other over a single match. If the match ends up as a draw, extra time will be played and if the match remains a draw a replay match is set at the home of the guest team which the extra time rule stands as well. If a winner doesn't occur after the replay match the winner emerges by a flip of a coin.

== Bracket ==
Round of 32
Olympiacos Chalkida	1
AEK Athens	2
Aris	3
Makedonikos	1
Panargiakos	1
Olympiacos	7
Neos Asteras Rethymno	1
Panionios	7
Panathinaikos	1
Asteras Athens	0
Anagennisi Karditsa	0
Athinaikos	3
Asteras Patras	1
Panachaiki	0
OFI	0
Fostiras	2
Iraklis (w/o)	2
Ethnikos Piraeus	0
Doxa Drama	3
Ermis Veria	0
Aspida Xanthi (a.e.t.)	4
Orfeas Xanthi	1
Diagoras	1
PAOK	0
Niki Volos	4
Olympiacos Volos	2
Iraklis Kavala	1
Apollon Kalamarias	2
Apollon Athens	7
Ethnikos Asteras	1
Olympiacos Loutraki	0
Atromitos Piraeus (w/o)	2

Round of 16
AEK Athens	2
Aris	1
Olympiacos	3
Panionios	1
Panathinaikos	2
Athinaikos	0
Asteras Patras	1	1
Fostiras (a.e.t.)	1	2
Iraklis	5
Doxa Drama	2
Aspida Xanthi	3
Diagoras	1
Niki Volos (a.e.t.)	3
Apollon Kalamarias	2
Apollon Athens	5
Atromitos Piraeus	0

Quarter-finals
AEK Athens	0
Olympiacos	1
Panathinaikos	2
Fostiras	1
Iraklis	3
Aspida Xanthi	0
Niki Volos	1
Apollon Athens	2

Semi-finals
Olympiacos	1
Panathinaikos	0
Iraklis	2
Apollon Athens	1

Final
Olympiacos	2
Iraklis	0

== Round of 32 ==
Team 1	Score	Team 2
Aris	3–1	Makedonikos
Asteras Patras	1–0	Panachaiki
Olympiacos Chalkida	1–2	AEK Athens
Olympiacos Loutraki	0–2 (w/o)	Atromitos Piraeus
Niki Volos	4–2	Olympiacos Volos
Iraklis Kavala	1–2	Apollon Kalamarias
OFI	0–2	Fostiras
Diagoras	1–0	PAOK
Aspida Xanthi	4–1 (a.e.t.)	Orfeas Xanthi
Iraklis	2–0 (w/o)	Ethnikos Piraeus
Apollon Athens	7–1	Ethnikos Asteras
Neos Asteras Rethymno	1–7	Panionios
Doxa Drama	3–0	Ermis Veria
Anagennisi Karditsa	0–3	Athinaikos
Panargiakos	1–7	Olympiacos
Panathinaikos	1–0	Asteras Athens

== Round of 16 ==
Team 1	Score/Agg.	Team 2	Match	Replay
Aspida Xanthi	3–1	Diagoras		
Iraklis	5–2	Doxa Drama		
Olympiacos	3–1	Panionios		
Apollon Athens	5–0	Atromitos Piraeus		
Asteras Patras	2–3	Fostiras	1–1	1–2 (a.e.t.)
Panathinaikos	2–0	Athinaikos		
AEK Athens	2–1	Aris		
Niki Volos	3–2 (a.e.t.)	Apollon Kalamarias		

== Quarter-finals ==
Team 1	Score	Team 2
Iraklis	3–0	Aspida Xanthi
AEK Athens	0–1	Olympiacos
Panathinaikos	2–1	Fostiras
Niki Volos	1–2	Apollon Athens

== Semi-finals ==
Team 1	Score	Team 2
Olympiacos	2–1	Panathinaikos
Iraklis	2–1	Apollon Athens

== Final ==
29 July 1957^{*}

Olympiacos	2–0	Iraklis
Kotridis 38'; Yfantis 73'	Report (page 3)

Karaiskakis Stadium, Piraeus
Referee: Leo Horn (Netherlands)

*According to the Greek FA's official site, the match was played on 30 July.
