= 1953–54 Greek Football Cup =

1953–54 Greek Cup
Tournament details
- Country: Greece

Final positions
- Champions: Olympiacos (5th title)
- Runners-up: Doxa Drama

The 1953–54 Greek Football Cup was the 12th edition of the Greek Football Cup. The competition culminated with the Greek Cup final, held at Leoforos Alexandras Stadium, on 23 May 1954. The match was contested by Olympiacos and Doxa Drama, with Olympiacos winning by 2–0.

== Calendar ==
Round	Date(s)	Fixtures	Clubs	New entries
First round	18, 20–23, 25, 26 October 1953	?	?	?
Second round	18, 25, 28 October 1953	?	?	?
Third round	1 November 1953	?	?	?
Fourth round	8 November 1953	?	?	?
Fifth round	15 November 1953	?	?	?
Sixth round	22 November 1953	?	?	?
Seventh round	29 November 1953	?	?	?
Eighth round	6, 20, 26 December 1953	?	?	?
Ninth round	27 December 1953, 7 January 1954	?	?	?
Tenth round	3, 6, 10 January 1954	?	? → 16	?
Round of 16	17, 28 January 1954	11	16 → 8	8
Quarter-finals		3	8 → 4	none
Semi-finals		2	4 → 2	none
Final	23 May 1954	1	2 → 1	none

== Qualification round ==
Known results of the qualifying rounds.

=== First round ===
Team 1	Score/Agg.	Team 2	Match	Replay
18 October 1953
AE Ampelokipoi	3–0	PO Psychiko		
Olympias	1–0	PO Agios Savvas		
Panelefsiniakos	2–0	Piraikos		
Akratitos	4–3	Ethnikos Petralona		
Panamvrakikos	4–0	Aetos Arta		
Panerythraikos	4–0	Atromitos Chalandri		
Arion	4–0	Afovos		
PAO Kalogreza	1–0	Nea Ionia		
AO Zografou	2–0	Armeniki	0–0	2–0 (w/o)
Keramikos	2–1	Ilisiakos		
Proodos	3–2	Victoria		
Athinaikos	4–2	Ethnikos Asteras		
Pangrati	3–2	Doxa Vyronas		
Esperos Kallitheas	4–2	Niki Plaka		
Atromitos	11–0	Doxa Peristeri		
Aris Piraeus	3–2	Near East		
OF Cholargos	5–3	Kronos		
Amfisaikos	5–2	Iraklis Lamia		
Panegialios	5–3	AE Aigio		
Pannafpliakos	4–1	Olympiacos Korinthos		
Aris Drama	6–2	Iraklis Andriani	1–1 (a.e.t.)	5–1
Doxa Drama	6–0	Doxa Sitargon		
Elpida Drama	4–0	AE Kyrgion		
Pallamiaki	4–0	Pamfthiotikos		
Olympiacos Lamia	3–2	Aias Lamia		
Prasina Poulia	4–0	Aias Lamia		
Panarkadikos	3–1	Asteras Tripolis		
Aspida Xanthi	4–0	Doxa Xanthi		
Orfeas Xanthi	3–2	AEK Xanthi		
Pallevadiaki	6–0	Panthivaikos		
Fostiras	2–1	Sparta		
Asteras Athens	5–0	Athinais		
Panionios	3–2	Iraklis Athens		
Palaia Kokkinia	3–0	Panaspropyrgiakos		
Egaleo	3–2	Doxa Athens		
Makedonikos	6–0	Akritas		
Toumba Youth	2–1	AO Charilaou		
PO Xirokrini	2–1	Neapolis		
PAOK	6–0	Marathonas		
Thermaikos	9–0	Dafni		
Megas Alexandros Thessaloniki	11–1	Doxa Neapolis		
20 October 1953
Aris Syros	5–3	Hellas Syros		
Olympiacos Naoussa	3–1	Akritas		
21 October 1953
Argonaftis	3–2	Chalkidona		
Panamrakikos	4–0	Aetos Arta		
22 October 1953
AE Karava	1–0	Archimidis		
Ethnikos Edessa	3–0	Megas Alexandros Veroia		
23 October 1953
Vyron Kavala	2–1	Neapolis Kavala		
Filippi Kavala	7–0	Aspida Kavala		
25 October 1953
AEK Kalamon	4–1	Olympiacos Kalamon		

=== Second round ===
Team 1	Score	Team 2
18 October 1953
Doxa Drama	5–2	Megas Alexandros Drama
25 October 1953
Panionios	7–1	Olympiada Athens
Asteras Athens	3–0	OF Cholargos
Fostiras	3–1	Akratitos
Aris Kerkyra	1–0 (a.e.t.)	Ellispontos
Olympiacos Ioannina	1–0	Averof Ioannina
Panamvrakikos	2–0	Olympiacos Arta
Ermis Verias	2–0	Makedonikos Kozani
28 October 1953
Olympiacos Volos	3–1	Pagasitikos
Niki Volos	2–1	Iraklis Larissa
Atromitos Ioannina	4–2	Achileus Trikala
Anagennisi Karditsa	5–4 (a.e.t.)	AE Trikala
29 October 1953
Iraklis Serres	2–1	Orfeas Serres
Ionia Chania	4–2	Asteras Chania
Ergotelis	2–0	Ethnikos Iraklio
Olympiacos Chania	2–0	Proodeftiki Poron

=== Third round ===
Team 1	Score/Agg.	Team 2	Match	Replay
Fostiras	2–1	Proodos		
Olympiacos Lamia	2–1	Pallamiaki		
Athinaikos	4–0	Palaia Kokkinia		
Panionios	3–0	PAO Kalogreza		
Asteras Athens	8–2	Keramikos		
Egaleo	4–0	Filathloi		
Pangrati	1–0	Arion		
Panelefsiniakos	2–0	AE Karava		
Olympiacos Argos	4–3	Panargiakos		
Panerythraikos	3–2	Esperos Kallitheas		
Aris Nikaia	2–0	Argonaftis		
AE Ampelokipoi	2–1	AO Zografou		
Apollon Serres	2–1	Iraklis Serres		
Panarkadikos	4–0	Aris Tripolis		
PAOK	9–1	APEL		
PO Xirokrini	?	Megas Alexandros Thessaloniki	2–2 (a.e.t.)	?
Thermaikos	2–1	Meliteus		
Makedonikos	?	AE Ampelokipoi Thessaloniki	0–0 (a.e.t.)	?
Atromitos Ioannina	6–0	Olympiacos Ioannina		

=== Fourth round ===
Team 1	Score	Team 2
Elpida Drama	3–2	Iraklis Kavala
Atromitos Ioannina	4–1	Panamvrakikos
Niki Volos	3–1	Ethnikos Volos
Olympiacos Volos	4–2	Anagennisi Karditsa
Olympiacos Lamia	2–1	Amfisaikos

=== Fifth round ===
Team 1	Score	Team 2
Atromitos Piraeus	2–1	AE Ampelokipoi
Athinaikos	1–0	Pangrati
Spartiatikos	2–0 (w/o)	Pannafpliakos
Panarkadikos	2–0	Prasina Poulia
Atromitos Ioannina	3–2	Aris Kerkyra
Egaleo	5–1	Panerythraikos

=== Sixth round ===
Team 1	Score	Team 2
Panelefsiniakos	4–2	Aris Piraeus
Spartiatikos	5–0	Pangythiatikos

=== Seventh round ===
Team 1	Score	Team 2
Egaleo	5–1	Panelefsiniakos
Spartiatikos	5–0	Pangythiatikos
Doxa Drama	2–1	Filippi Kavala

=== Eighth round ===
Team 1	Score	Team 2
6 December 1953
Doxa Drama	7–0	Elpida Drama
Apollon Serres	1–0	Iraklis Serres
20 December 1953
Athinaikos	2–1	Fostiras
Panionios	4–0	Olympiacos Lamia
Panarkadikos	0–0^{1}	Olympiacos Loutraki
26 December 1953
Thermaikos	2–0	Ermis Verias

^{1} The match was suspended at the 55th minute, due to the unsuitability of the pitch.

=== Ninth round ===
Team 1	Score/Agg.	Team 2	Match	Replay
Diagoras	?	Atromitos Piraeus	2–2	?
PAOK	6–0	Apollon Serres		
Makedonikos	1–0	Thermaikos		
Niki Volos	5–0	Olympiacos Volos		

=== Tenth round ===
Team 1	Score/Agg.	Team 2	Match	Replay
3 January 1954
Panionios	2–1	Egaleo		
Asteras Athens	?	Athinaikos	1–1 (a.e.t.)	?
6 January 1954
PAOK	?	Makedonikos		
Doxa Drama	?	Doxa Alexandroupoli		
10 January 1954
Thyella Patras	3–0	Panarkadikos		

== Knockout phase ==
In the knockout phase, teams play against each other over a single match. If the match ends up as a draw, extra time will be played and if the match remains a draw a replay match is set at the home of the guest team which the extra time rule stands as well. If a winner doesn't occur after the replay match the winner emerges by a flip of a coin.
The mechanism of the draws for each round is as follows:

- In the draw for the round of 16, the eight top teams of each association are seeded and the eight clubs that passed the qualification round are unseeded.
  The seeded teams are drawn against the unseeded teams.
- In the draws for the quarter-finals onwards, there are no seedings, and teams from the same group can be drawn against each other.

== Bracket ==
Round of 16
AEK Athens	0	0
Asteras Athens (a.e.t.)	0	1
Atromitos Piraeus	0
Olympiacos	2
Panathinaikos	2
Ethnikos Piraeus	0
Thyella Patras	0	0
Apollon Athens	0	1
Aris (a.e.t.)	2
Iraklis	1
Doxa Drama	3
PAOK	2
OFI	1
Panionios (a.e.t.)	2
Niki Volos	2	1
Apollon Kalamarias	2	2

Quarter-finals
Asteras Athens	0
Olympiacos	4
Panathinaikos	0
Apollon Athens	1
Aris	1
Doxa Drama	2
Panionios (w/o)	2
Apollon Kalamarias	0

Semi-finals
Olympiacos	1	1
Apollon Athens	1	0
Doxa Drama (w/o)	2
Panionios	0

Final
Olympiacos	2
Doxa Drama	0

== Round of 16 ==
Team 1	Score/Agg.	Team 2	Match	Replay
Panathinaikos	2–0	Ethnikos Piraeus		
Niki Volos	3–4	Apollon Kalamarias	2–2	1–2
Doxa Drama	3–2	PAOK		
Atromitos Piraeus	0–2	Olympiacos		
AEK Athens	0–1	Asteras Athens	0–0	0–1 (a.e.t.)
OFI	1–2 (a.e.t.)	Panionios		
Aris	2–1 (a.e.t.)	Iraklis		
Thyella Patras	0–1	Apollon Athens	0–0	0–1

== Quarter-finals ==
Team 1	Score	Team 2
Panathinaikos	0–1	Apollon Athens
Panionios	2–0 (w/o)	Apollon Kalamarias
Aris	1–2	Doxa Drama
Asteras Athens	0–4	Olympiacos

== Semi-finals ==
Team 1	Score/Agg.	Team 2	Match	Replay
Olympiacos	2–1	Apollon Athens	1–1^{*}	1–0
Doxa Drama	2–0 (w/o)	Panionios		

^{*}There was no extra time "due to extremely muddy ground".

== Final ==
23 May 1954
17:00 EET

Olympiacos	2–0	Doxa Drama
Drosos 31'; Darivas 38'	Report

Leoforos Alexandras Stadium, Ampelokipoi
Referee: Kostas Tzitzis (Athens)
