= Dimitris Theofanis =

Greek footballer (1933–2024)

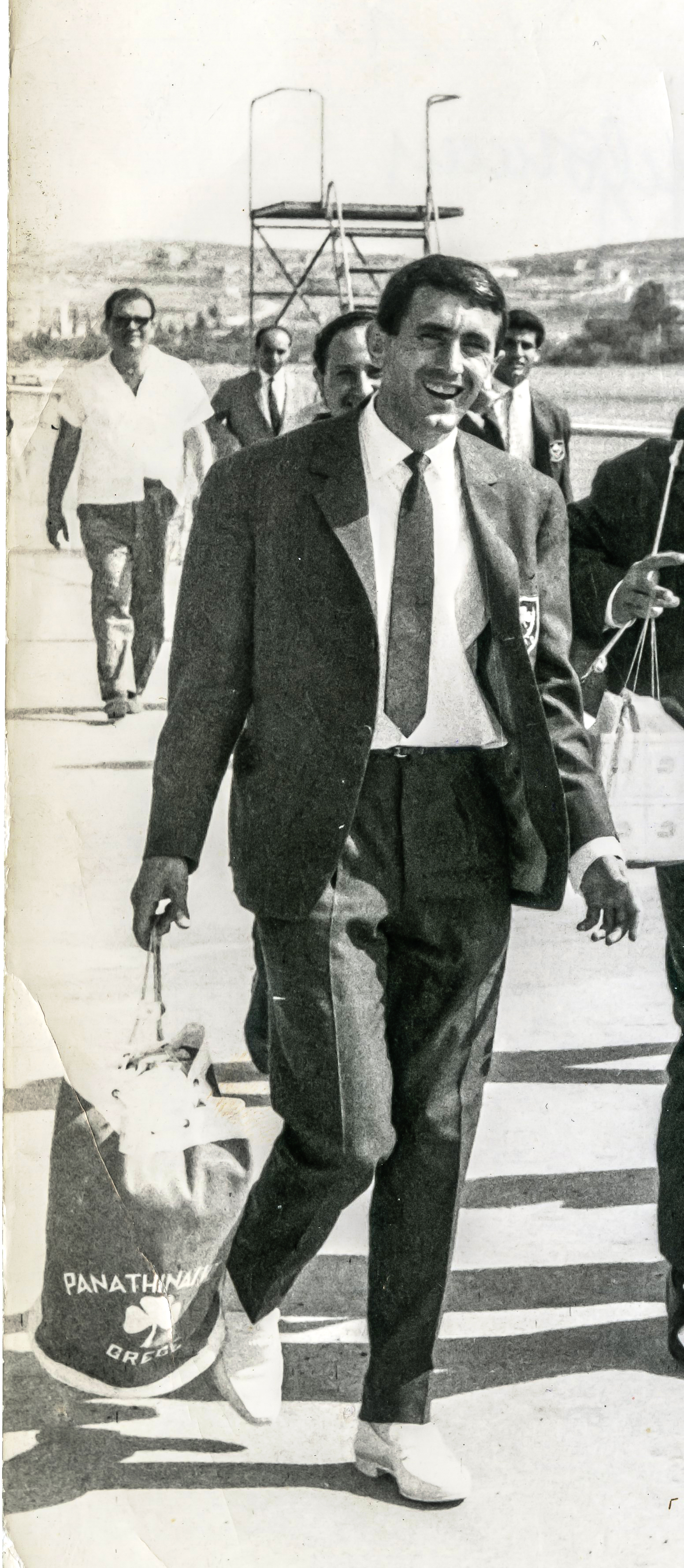
- Theofanis in 1962

Personal information
- Date of birth: 31 May 1933
- Place of birth: Nafpaktos, Greece
- Date of death: 3 August 2024 (aged 91)
- Place of death: Athens, Greece
- Position: Forward

Senior career*
Years	Team	Apps	(Gls)
1954–1956	Athinaikos		
1956–1966	Panathinaikos		

International career
1958–1962	Greece	4	(0)

Managerial career
- 1994–1997: Doxa Vyronas
- 1998–1999: Panegialios
- 2000–2001: Ethnikos Piraeus
- * Club domestic league appearances and goals

Dimitris Theofanis (Greek: Δημήτρης Θεοφάνης; 31 May 1933 – 3 August 2024), nicknamed Loris (Greek: Λώρης), was a Greek football player and manager who played as a forward. He died from a cardiac arrest in Athens, on 3 August 2024, at the age of 91.
