= Babis Kotridis =

Greek footballer and manager (1928–2009)

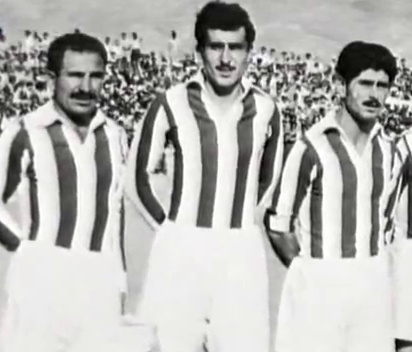
- Kotridis between Mouratis and Rosidis (right)

Personal information
- Full name: Charalampos Kotridis
- Date of birth: 30 October 1928
- Place of birth: Drapetsona, Piraeus, Greece
- Date of death: 18 April 2009 (aged 80)
- Place of death: Athens, Greece
- Position: Midfielder

Youth career
- –1945: AE Agios Nikolaos Piraeus

Senior career*
Years	Team	Apps	(Gls)
1945–1961	Olympiacos	223	(48)
Total		223	(48)

International career
1951–1957	Greece	18	(1)

Managerial career
- 1964: Panegialios
- * Club domestic league appearances and goals

Babis Kotridis (Greek: Μπάμπης Κοτρίδης; 30 October 1928 – 18 April 2009) was a Greek professional footballer. He played in 18 matches for the Greece national football team from 1951 to 1957. He was also part of Greece's team for the 1952 Summer Olympics, and their qualification matches for the 1954 FIFA World Cup.

== Honours ==
Olympiacos

- Panhellenic Championship: 1946–47, 1947–48, 1950–51, 1953–54, 1954–55, 1955–56, 1956–57, 1957–58, 1958–59
- Greek Cup: 1946–47, 1950–51, 1951–52, 1952–53, 1953–54, 1956–57, 1957–58, 1958–59, 1959–60, 1960–61

== See also ==
- List of one-club men in association football
