= Giannis Papantoniou =

Greek footballer (1928–2015)

Personal information
- Date of birth: 9 March 1928
- Date of death: 8 January 2015 (aged 86)
- Position: Midfielder

Senior career*
Years	Team	Apps	(Gls)
- Panathinaikos

International career
1948–1956	Greece	15	(0)
- * Club domestic league appearances and goals

Giannis Papantoniou (9 March 1928 – 8 January 2015) was a Greek footballer who played as a midfielder. He made 15 appearances for the Greece national team from 1948 to 1956. He was also part of Greece's team for their qualification matches for the 1954 FIFA World Cup.

== Honours ==
Panathinaikos

- Alpha Ethniki: 1948-49, 1952-53.
