= Orfeas Xanthi F.C. =

Orfeas Xanthi
- Full name: Athlitikos Omilos Orfeas Xanthi
- Founded: 1903; 123 years ago
- Ground: Pigadeia-Xanthi FC Arena (2026); Xanthi Ground (2004)
- Capacity: 9,500
- League: Xanthi FCA Second Division
- 2025–26: Xanthi FCA Second Division (Group 2), 4th
Home colours	Away colours

Orfeas Xanthi Football Club (Greek: Ορφέας Ξάνθης) is a Greek football club based in Xanthi, Greece.

== Honours ==
=== National ===
  - Fourth Tier Champions: 1
    - 2020–21

=== Domestic ===
  - Xanthi FCA Champions: 7
    - 1992–93, 1996–97, 2000–01, 2001–02, 2003–04, 2012–13, 2015–16
  - Xanthi FCA Cup Winners: 8
    - 1985–86, 1997–98, 1998–99, 2002–03, 2003–04, 2006–07, 2009–10, 2011–12
