= Ioannis Nembidis =

Greek footballer

Personal information
- Date of birth: 10 March 1928
- Date of death: 6 November 2000 (aged 72)

International career
Years	Team	Apps	(Gls)
1949–1958	Greece	7	(2)

Ioannis Nembidis (10 March 1928 – 6 November 2000) was a Greek footballer. He played in seven matches for the Greece national football team from 1949 to 1958. He was also named in Greece's squad for the Group 10 qualification tournament for the 1954 FIFA World Cup.
