= Elias Yfantis =

Greek footballer (born 1936)

Personal information
- Full name: Elias Yfantis
- Date of birth: 29 July 1936 (age 90)
- Place of birth: Piraeus, Greece
- Height: 1.80 m (5 ft 11 in)
- Position: Striker

Youth career
- 1950–1953: Olympiacos

Senior career*
Years	Team	Apps	(Gls)
1953–1964	Olympiacos	315	(244)
1964–1965	Ethnikos Piraeus	18	(1)
Total		333	(245)

International career
1957–1960	Greece	7	(2)
1960	Greece Olympic	1	(0)

Managerial career
- 1970: Olympiacos
- * Club domestic league appearances and goals

Elias Yfantis (Greek: Ηλίας Υφαντής; born 29 July 1936) is a Greek former professional football player who played as a striker and a later manager of Olympiacos. He was a key member of Olympiacos during the 1950s and 1960s.

== Biography ==
Born in Aghia Sophia in Piraeus, Yfantis joined the senior side of Olympiacos F.C. at the age of 17. He played for the first time in an official match in 1953. He played as a forward and scored 225 career goals in all competitions. In A'Ethniki, he not only played in 58 games in three seasons and scored 30 goals, but he had also scored first for the historic struggle of Olympiacos in European competition against AC Milan (final score 2–2). Serious injuries forced him to quit football in 1964 at the age of 28.

He made seven appearances and scored two goals for the Greece national football team, playing from 1957 to 1960.

In 1970, he became the head coach of Olympiacos as caretaker manager, and later for many years in parts of the infrastructure of the club.

== Honours ==
Olympiacos

- Panhellenic Championship: 1953–54, 1954–55, 1955–56, 1956–57, 1957–58, 1958–59
- Greek Cup: 1953–54, 1956–57, 1957–58, 1958–59, 1959–60, 1960–61, 1962–63
- Piraeus FCA League: 1954, 1955, 1956, 1957, 1958, 1959
