= 1959–60 Greek Football Cup =

1959–60 Greek Cup
Tournament details
- Country: Greece

Final positions
- Champions: Olympiacos (9th title)
- Runners-up: Panathinaikos

The 1959–60 Greek Football Cup was the 18th edition of the Greek Football Cup. The competition culminated with the Greek Cup Final, replayed at Karaiskakis Stadium, on 11 September 1960, because of the previous match (7 August) ending in a draw. The match was contested by Olympiacos and Panathinaikos, with Olympiacos winning 3–0.

== Calendar ==
From Round of 32 onwards:

Round	Date(s)	Fixtures	Clubs	New entries
Round of 32	10 April 1960	16	32 → 16	none
Round of 16	1960	8	16 → 8	none
Quarter-finals	1960	5	8 → 4	none
Semi-finals	1960	3	4 → 2	none
Final	7 August, 11 September 1960	2	2 → 1	none

== Knockout phase ==
In the knockout phase, teams played against each other over a single match. If the match ended a draw, extra time was played and if the match remained a draw a replay match was set at the home of the guest team with extra time if needed. If this remained level, a coin toss decided the winner.

== Bracket ==
Round of 32
Apollon Serres	1
Iraklis (a.e.t.)	2
Panathinaikos	8
Apollon Kalamata	0
Olympiakos Patras	0
Apollon Athens	2
Niki Volos	1
Megas Alexandros Katerini	0
Proodeftiki	1
Egaleo	0
OFI	1
Ergotelis	0
Pankorinthiakos	2
Panetolikos	0
Iraklis Serres	0
Doxa Drama	4
Olympiacos	3
Diagoras	1
ΑΕ Komotini	3
Aspida Xanthi	1
Olympiacos Chalkida	2
AEK Athens	0
Olympos Katerini	2
Makedonikos Kozani	1
Panegialios (a.e.t.)	3
Atromitos Piraeus	2
Pallamiaki	2
Panionios	7
Aris	1
Thermaikos	0
Olympiacos Volos	3
Achilleas Triandria	0

Round of 16
Iraklis	0
Panathinaikos	1
Apollon Athens	0
Niki Volos	1
Proodeftiki	2
OFI	1
Pankorinthiakos	4
Doxa Drama	1
Olympiacos	6
AE Komotini	0
Olympiacos Chalkida	3
Olympos Katerini	1
Panegialios	3
Panionios	1
Aris	4
Olympiacos Volos	1

Quarter-finals
Panathinaikos	4
Niki Volos	0
Proodeftiki	2	5
Pankorinthiakos	2	0
Olympiacos	4
Olympiacos Chalkida	1
Panegialios	2
Aris	0

Semi-finals
Panathinaikos (c)	1	3
Proodeftiki	1	3
Olympiacos	3
Panegialios	1

Final
Panathinaikos	1	0
Olympiacos	1	3

== Round of 32 ==
Team 1	Score	Team 2
Aris	1–0	Thermaikos
Olympiakos Patras	0–2	Apollon Athens
Panegialios	3–2 (a.e.t.)	Atromitos Piraeus
Pankorinthiakos	2–0	Panetolikos
Olympiacos Chalkida	2–0	AEK Athens
Olympos Katerini	2–1	Makedonikos Kozani
ΑΕ Komotini	2–1	Aspida Xanthi
Pallamiaki	2–7	Panionios
Niki Volos	1–0	Megas Alexandros Katerini
Olympiacos	3–1	Diagoras
Iraklis Serres	0–4	Doxa Drama
Olympiacos Volos	3–0	Achilleas Triandria
Apollon Serres	1–2 (a.e.t.)	Iraklis
OFI	1–0	Ergotelis
Panathinaikos	8–0	Apollon Kalamata
Proodeftiki	1–0	Egaleo

== Round of 16 ==
Team 1	Score	Team 2
Iraklis	0–1	Panathinaikos
Proodeftiki	2–1	OFI
Olympiacos	6–0	ΑΕ Komotini
Aris	4–1	Olympiacos Volos
Apollon Athens	0–1	Niki Volos
Olympiacos Chalkida	3–1	Olympos Katerini
Panegialios	3–1	Panionios
Pankorinthiakos	4–1	Doxa Drama

== Quarter-finals ==
Team 1	Score/Agg.	Team 2	Match	Replay
Olympiacos	4–0	Olympiacos Chalkida		
Panathinaikos	4–0	Niki Volos		
Panegialios	2–0	Aris		
Proodeftiki	7–2	Pankorinthiakos	2–2 (a.e.t.)	5–0

== Semi-finals ==
Team 1	Score/Agg.	Team 2	Match	Replay
Olympiacos	3–1	Panegialios		
Panathinaikos	4–4	Proodeftiki	1–1 (a.e.t.)	3–3^{*} (a.e.t.)

^{*} Panathinaikos won by the flip of a coin.

== Final ==
7 August 1960

Panathinaikos	1–1	Olympiacos
Papaemmanouil 16'	Report (page 5)	Bebis 50'

Leoforos Alexandras Stadium, Ampelokipoi
Attendance: 25,000
Referee: José Blanco Pérez (Spain)

=== Replay match ===
11 September 1960

Olympiacos	3–0	Panathinaikos
Polychroniou 25', 35'; Sideris 82'	Report (page 5)

Karaiskakis Stadium, Piraeus
Referee: José Blanco Pérez (Spain)
