= Bruno Vale (Italian footballer) =

Italian footballer and coach (born 1911)

Personal information
- Date of birth: 10 July 1911
- Place of birth: Fiume, Austria-Hungary (now Rijeka, Croatia)
- Date of death: Unknown
- Height: 1.71 m (5 ft 7 1/2 in)
- Position: Midfielder

Senior career*
Years	Team	Apps	(Gls)
1930–1934	Pro Gorizia		
1934–1935	Alessandria	1	(0)
1935–1936	Arezzo		
1936–1938	Venezia	52	(3)
1938–1939	Ambrosiana-Inter	18	(2)
1939–1941	Novara	53	(0)
1941–1942	Brescia	32	(0)
1942–1944	Pro Gorizia	39	(0)
1945–1946	Novara	4	(0)
1946–1947	Reggiana	1	(0)

Managerial career
- 1958–1960: Olympiacos
- * Club domestic league appearances and goals

Bruno Vale (born 10 July 1911) was an Italian professional football player and coach.

== Honours ==
=== Player ===
Ambrosiana-Inter

- Coppa Italia: 1938–39

=== Manager ===
Olympiacos

- Panhellenic Champinship: 1958–59
- Greek Cup: 1958–59
