= Asteras Rethymno F.C. =

Asteras Rethymno
- Full name: Athlitikos Omilos Asteras Rethymno
- Founded: 25 February 1945; 81 years ago
- Ground: Sochora Stadium, Rethymno
- Capacity: 2,500
- Chairman: Nikos Papadakis
- Manager: Panagiotis Karantathas
- League: Rethymno FCA First Division
- 2025–26: Rethymno FCA First Division, 7th
- Website: https://asterasrethymnou.gr/
Home colours	Away colours

Athlitikos Omilos Asteras Rethymno (Greek: Αθλητικός Όμιλος Νέος Αστέρας Ρεθύμνου) is a football club based in Sochora, Rethymno, Crete. Its official colours are blue and yellow.

== History ==
Neos Asteras Rethymno is one of the most historical football clubs in Rethymno, based in Sochora. It was founded in 1945 by a group of young men, including Antonis Gasparakis, Antonis Arampatzoglou, Achilleas Simsiris, Anastasios Giachakis, among others. The club's first official meeting took place on 25 February 1945, chaired by Giannis Lymakis. The initial board of directors named the newly established club PAS Astir (Football Athletic Club Astir) as a tribute to Astir Gyzi (later Asteras Exarchion), which provided athletic gear through a relative of Antonis Gasparakis. In 1957, Asteras Rethymno was crowned Champion of Crete by winning the Cretan Cup—defeating teams such as PALMER, Irodotos, Ergotelis, and Ionia—and reached the semi-finals of the Greek Cup, where they were defeated 1–7 by Panionios. On 28 July 1961, following a general assembly, the members of Asteras decided to merge PAS Astir with Keravnos to form Rethymniakos. Exactly one year later, on 4 July 1962, the club was re-established under the name AO Neos Asteras Rethymno. However, in August 1967, the club's activities were suspended due to the Greek military junta.

AO Neos Asteras Rethymno was reactivated seven years later on 13 December 1974, following the restoration of democracy in Greece, and has continuously participated in Rethymno football ever since. The year 2007 was a historic milestone for the club; under president Dimitris Pernientakis and Rethymniot manager Giannis Petrakis, the team won the Group 10 title in the Delta Ethniki. On 20 May 2007, Asteras Rethymno secured promotion to professional divisions for the first time in its history, remaining in Gamma Ethniki for two consecutive seasons.

Among the club's major achievements is winning the Cretan Amateur Cup in 2005, once again reaching the semi-finals of the Greek Football Amateur Cup, where they were defeated 3–1 by Keravnos Keratea.

In its 80-year history, Asteras Rethymnou has produced notable footballers and figures. Georgios Kokolakis, who had a decade-long career in the Alpha Ethniki playing for Olympiacos, took his first footballing steps and was nurtured at Asteras Rethymno. Former Minister Emmanouil Loukakis was also a lifelong supporter and player for Asteras, subsequently serving as the club's president for four years.

== Stadium ==
Set against the backdrop of the Fortezza fortress and right beside the sea stands the historical Rethymno Municipal Stadium (Sochora). It serves as the home ground of Asteras Rethymno, where many of the club's greatest achievements have taken place.

== Academies ==
For decades, Asteras Rethymno has supported young talent, operating one of the most recognized youth academies not only in Rethymno or Crete, but throughout Greece. Hundreds of players have emerged from the club's youth ranks, headlined by Giorgos Kokolakis, who excelled for over a decade in Alpha Ethniki with top clubs such as Olympiacos and OFI. In recent years, two more academy products, Giannis Apostolakis and Giannis Theodosoulakis, have risen to prominence playing in Super League 1 with OFI. Numerous other players trained at Asteras Rethymno's academy have developed and transferred to major professional clubs in Greece and abroad. In the summer of 2022, the club's academy established an official partnership with the OFI FC Elite Academy, the leading youth development program on the island of Crete. This was followed in the summer of 2024 by an all-level collaboration with AE Atsipopoulou-Prine.

== Honours ==
=== National titles ===
- Delta Ethniki: 1
  - 2006–07

=== Regional titles ===
- Rethymno FCA First Division: 9
  - 1966–67, 1976–77, 1981–82, 1986–87, 1990–91, 1997–98, 1999–2000, 2001–02, 2019–20
- Rethymno FCA Cup: 12
  - 1950–51, 1952–53, 1956–57, 1957–58, 1958–59, 1977–78, 1999–2000, 2000–01, 2002–03, 2004–05, 2005–06, 2022–23
- Rethymno FCA Super Cup: 5
  - 1998, 2003, 2005, 2006, 2020
- Crete Cup: 2
  - 1956–57, 2004–05
