= 1957–58 Greek Football Cup =

1957–58 Greek Cup
Tournament details
- Country: Greece

Final positions
- Champions: Olympiacos (7th title)
- Runners-up: Doxa Drama

The 1957–58 Greek Football Cup was the 16th edition of the Greek Football Cup. The competition culminated with the Greek Cup Final, held at Karaiskakis Stadium, on 30 July 1958. The match was contested by Olympiacos and Doxa Drama, with Olympiacos winning by 5–1.

== Calendar ==
From Round of 32 onwards:

| Round | Date(s) | Fixtures | Clubs | New entries |
|---|---|---|---|---|
| Round of 32 | 30 March 1958 | 16 | 32 → 16 | none |
| Round of 16 | 6 April 1958 | 9 | 16 → 8 | none |
| Quarter-finals | 13 July 1958 | 2 | 8 → 4 | none |
| Semi-finals | July 1958 | 3 | 4 → 2 | none |
| Final | 30 July 1958 | 1 | 2 → 1 | none |

== Knockout phase ==
In the knockout phase, teams play against each other over a single match. If the match ends up as a draw, extra time will be played and if the match remains a draw a replay match is set at the home of the guest team which the extra time rule stands as well. If a winner doesn't occur after the replay match the winner emerges by a flip of a coin.

== Bracket ==
Round of 32
OFI | 5
Neos Asteras Rethymno | 2
Olympiacos | 9
Olympiacos Chalkida | 0
AEK Athens | 2
Asteras Athens | 0
Diagoras | 0
Atromitos Piraeus | 1
Olympiakos Patras | 2 | 2
Panachaiki | 2 | 1
Apollon Kalamata | 2
Panathinaikos | 3
Ethnikos Alexandroupoli | 0
Aris | 4
PAOK | 2
Ermis Veria | 0
Niki Volos | 5
Olympiacos Volos | 3
Elpis Drama | 1
Iraklis | 3
Panargiakos | 0
Proodeftiki | 2
Panegialios (a.e.t.) | 2
Panionios | 1
AE Kavala | 0
Doxa Drama | 3
Apollon Kalamarias | 3
Olympos Katerini | 0
Ethnikos Piraeus | 1
Fostiras | 3
Apollon Athens | 1
Αchilleus Trikala | 2

Round of 16
OFI | 0
Olympiacos | 2
AEK Athens | 2
Atromitos Piraeus | 0
Olympiakos Patras | 0
Panathinaikos | 4
Aris | 2
PAOK | 0
Niki Volos | 0 | 0
Iraklis (w/o) | 0 | 2
Proodeftiki | 0
Panegialios | 1
Doxa Drama | 1
Apollon Kalamarias | 0
Fostiras | 5
Αchilleus Trikala | 4

Quarter-finals
Olympiacos | 2
AEK Athens | 1
Panathinaikos (w/o) | 2
Aris | 0
Iraklis (w/o) | 2
Panegialios | 0
Doxa Drama | 3
Fostiras | 1

Semi-finals
Olympiacos | 3
Panathinaikos | 0
Iraklis | 1 | 0
Doxa Drama | 1 | 1

Final
Olympiacos | 5
Doxa Drama | 1

== Round of 32 ==
| Team 1 | Score/Agg. | Team 2 | Match | Replay |
|---|---|---|---|---|
| Ethnikos Alexandroupoli | 0–4 | Aris | | |
| Niki Volos | 5–3 | Olympiacos Volos | | |
| Olympiakos Patras | 4–3 | Panachaiki | 2–2 (a.e.t.) | 2–1 |
| Diagoras | 0–1 | Atromitos Piraeus | | |
| AE Kavala | 0–2 | Doxa Drama | | |
| Apollon Athens | 1–2 | Αchilleus Trikala | | |
| Apollon Kalamata | 2–3 | Panathinaikos | | |
| Elpis Drama | 1–3 | Iraklis | | |
| OFI | 5–2 | Neos Asteras Rethymno | | |
| Panegialios | 2–1 (a.e.t.) | Panionios | | |
| Ethnikos Piraeus | 1–3 | Fostiras | | |
| PAOK | 2–0 | Ermis Veria | | |
| Olympiacos | 9–0 | Olympiacos Chalkida | | |
| AEK Athens | 2–0 | Asteras Athens | | |
| Panargiakos | 0–2 | Proodeftiki | | |
| Apollon Kalamarias | 3–0 | Olympos Katerini | | |

== Round of 16 ==
| Team 1 | Score/Agg. | Team 2 | Match | Replay |
|---|---|---|---|---|
| Fostiras | 5–4 | Αchilleus Trikala | | |
| AEK Athens | 2–0 | Atromitos Piraeus | | |
| Proodeftiki | 0–1 | Panegialios | | |
| Aris | 2–0 | PAOK | | |
| Niki Volos | 0–2 | Iraklis | 0–0 | 0–2 (w/o)^{*} |
| Olympiakos Patras | 0–4 | Panathinaikos | | |
| OFI | 0–2 | Olympiacos | | |
| Doxa Drama | 1–0 | Apollon Kalamarias | | |

^{*} The match was suspended at the 43rd minute in expense of Niki Volos while the score was 1–2. Awarded to Iraklis.

== Quarter-finals ==
| Team 1 | Score | Team 2 |
|---|---|---|
| Olympiacos | 2–1 | AEK Athens |
| Doxa Drama | 3–1 | Fostiras |
| Iraklis | 2–0 (w/o) | Panegialios^{*} |
| Panathinaikos | 2–0 (w/o) | Aris^{*} |

^{*} Withdrawn.

== Semi-finals ==
| Team 1 | Score/Agg. | Team 2 | Match | Replay |
|---|---|---|---|---|
| Olympiacos | 3–0 | Panathinaikos | | |
| Iraklis | 1–2 | Doxa Drama | 1–1 (a.e.t.) | 0–1 |

== Final ==
30 July 1958
17:15 EET

| Olympiacos | 5–1 | Doxa Drama |
|---|---|---|
| Gavezos 22'; Bebis 43'; Polychroniou 63', 87'; Yfantis 89' | Report (page 4) | Nalbantis 52' |

Karaiskakis Stadium, Piraeus
Attendance: 22,000
Referee: Zivko Bajić (Yugoslavia)
