= Nikos Pangalos =

Greek football manager

Personal information
- Full name: Nikolaos Pangalos
- Date of birth: 14 February 1915
- Date of death: 21 March 2002 (aged 87)

Managerial career
- Years: Team
- 1949–1950: PAOK
- 1952–1953: PAOK
- 1954–1955: PAOK
- 1956–1959: Doxa Drama
- 1957: Greece B
- 1966–1967: PAOK
- 1967–1968: Niki Volos
- 1968–1969: Panserraikos
- 1971: Panserraikos (caretaker)
- 1984: Panserraikos (caretaker)

Nikos Pangalos (Greek: Νικος Πάγκαλος; 14 February 1915 – 21 March 2002) was a Greek football manager.
