= 1956–57 Panhellenic Championship =

21st season of top-tier football league in Greece

Panhellenic Championship
- Season: 1956–57
- Champions: Olympiacos; 13th Greek title
- Relegated: none
- Matches: 90
- Goals: 289 (3.21 per match)
- Top goalscorer: Petros Christofidis (15 goals)
- Biggest home win: Apollon Athens 8–0 Panargiakos
- Biggest away win: Panargiakos 0–6 Panathinaikos
- Highest scoring: Apollon Athens 8–0 Panargiakos
- Longest winless run: Panargiakos (16 matches)
- Longest losing run: Panargiakos (16 matches)

The 1956–57 Panhellenic Championship was the 21st season of the highest football league of Greece and one of the most interesting championships in the 50s and also one of the most discussed due to the punishment of Ethnikos Piraeus from the HFF. Olympiacos won their 13th championship (4 consecutive) after an interesting race with Panathinaikos which ended in a tie and therefore the title was decided by a play-off round in which Olympiacos won.

Compared to the previous season, the teams that participated in the final phase of the championship increased by 4 (10 out of 6) and resulted as follows:

- Athenian Championship: The first 3 teams of the ranking.
- Piraeus' Championship: The first 2 teams of the ranking.
- Macedonian Championship: The first 2 teams of the ranking.
- Regional Championship: The 2 winners (North and South group).
- An additional position was secured after a play-off round between the third teams Piraeus' and Macedonian Championship.

The qualifying round matches took place from 16 September 1956 to 11 January 1957, while the final phase took place from 13 January to 18 July 1957. The point system was: Win: 3 points - Draw: 2 points - Loss: 1 point.

== Qualification round ==
=== Athens Football Clubs Association ===
Pos	Team	Pld	W	D	L	GF	GA	GD	Pts	Qualification	PAO	PGSS	APOL	AEK	EGA	AST	ATH	FOS
1	Panathinaikos (Q)	14	10	3	1	30	11	+19	37	Final round		2–0	2–0	1–1	3–1	2–0	2–0	3–2
2	Panionios (Q)	14	8	2	4	20	17	+3	32	Final round	3–2		1–1	1–2	4–1	2–0	2–1	2–1
3	Apollon Athens (Q)	14	5	7	2	25	13	+12	31	Final round	0–1	4–0		2–2	1–1	1–1	2–1	3–0
4	AEK Athens	14	5	6	3	21	15	+6	30		1–2	0–1	3–3		2–0	0–0	2–0	2–2
5	Egaleo	14	4	4	6	12	26	−14	26		0–6	1–0	1–6	0–0		0–0	2–0	1–1
6	Asteras Athens	14	2	7	5	7	15	−8	25		1–1	0–1	0–0	0–3	1–0		3–2	1–1
7	Athinaikos	14	2	5	7	13	21	−8	23		1–1	1–1	0–0	2–1	2–3	0–0		2–1
8	Fostiras	14	1	4	9	14	24	−10	20		1–2	1–2	0–2	1–2	0–1	2–0	1–1	

Source: rsssf
(Q) Qualified for the phase indicated

=== Piraeus Football Clubs Association ===
Pos	Team	Pld	W	D	L	GF	GA	GD	Pts	Qualification	OLY	PRO	ETH	ATR	PAN	ARIS	AEN	FIL	DOX
1	Olympiacos (Q)	16	16	0	0	69	7	+62	48	Final round		2–1	3–0	7–0	4–1	2–1	7–0	9–0	2–0
2	Proodeftiki (Q)	16	9	3	4	26	16	+10	37	Final round	0–4		2–1	1–0	4–1	3–2	1–1	4–0	2–1
3	Ethnikos Piraeus (A)	16	9	2	5	31	17	+14	36	3rd-place play-offs	1–3	1–0		1–0	0–0	4–1	6–3	3–0	6–1
4	Atromitos Piraeus (Note: Atromitos Piraeus has 1 defeat without a match and -1 point.)	16	6	4	6	17	22	−5	31		1–2	1–0	2–1		3–1	2–1	4–2	1–1	0–0
5	Panelefsiniakos	16	4	5	7	15	28	−13	29		1–7	1–1	1–1	2–0 (Note: The initial 2–1 was repeated, but Atromitos Piraeus resigned. Awarded 2–0 to Panelefsiniakos.)		1–0	2–1	1–1	1–0
6	Aris Piraeus	16	4	3	9	16	30	−14	27 (Note: 5–7 place ranking match: Aris Piraeus–Filathloi Nikaia 1–0, AE Nikaia–Aris Piraeus 1–0, Filathloi Nikaia–AE Nikaia 3–2. The ranking was formed based on the goal difference in the championship.)		1–7	0–0	0–2	1–0	2–1		2–1	1–1	0–0
7	AE Nikaia	16	4	3	9	20	38	−18	27		0–4	1–3	0–2	1–1	2–0	3–1		1–0	1–0
8	Filathloi Nikaia	16	3	5	8	13	36	−23	27		0–4	0–3	0–2	1–2	1–0	2–1	3–1		2–2
9	Doxa Piraeus	16	1	7	8	10	23	−13	25		0–2	0–1	1–0	0–0	1–1	1–2	2–2	1–1	

Source: rsssf
(A) Advance to a further round; (Q) Qualified for the phase indicated

=== Macedonia Football Clubs Association ===
Pos	Team	Pld	W	D	L	GF	GA	GD	Pts	Qualification	PAOK	ARIS	APOL	MAK	IRA	MEL
1	PAOK (Q)	10	6	2	2	20	8	+12	24	Final round		1–1	3–0	2–1	0–1	8–2
2	Aris (Q)	10	5	3	2	12	6	+6	23	Final round	0–1		1–1	1–0	2–0	2–0
3	Apollon Kalamarias (A)	10	5	2	3	18	14	+4	22	3rd-place play-offs	2–1	1–2		2–1	3–1	3–2
4	Makedonikos	10	3	2	5	9	12	−3	18 (Note: 4th-place ranking match: Makedonikos–Iraklis 3–2.)		0–2	2–1	3–2		1–0	0–0
5	Iraklis	10	2	4	4	8	11	−3	18		1–2	0–0	0–0	1–1		3–1
6	Meliteas	10	1	3	6	7	23	−16	15		0–0	0–2	0–4	1–0	1–1	

Source: rsssf
(A) Advance to a further round; (Q) Qualified for the phase indicated

=== Piraeus/Macedonia 3rd teams play-offs ===
Team 1	Agg.	Team 2	1st leg	2nd leg
Apollon Kalamarias	1–3	Ethnikos Piraeus	1–1	0–2

=== Regional Championship ===
==== South Group ====
Pos	Team	Pld	W	D	L	GF	GA	GD	Pts	Qualification	PNA	OFI	PAN	OLY
1	Panargiakos (Q)	6	2	3	1	5	4	+1	13	Final round		0–0	0–0	1–0
2	OFI	6	3	1	2	5	5	0	13		0–2		0–1	2–1
3	Panachaiki	6	2	2	2	5	5	0	12		1–1	0–1		3–1
4	Olympiacos Chalkidas	6	2	0	4	8	9	−1	10		3–1	1–2	2–0	

Source: rsssf
(Q) Qualified for the phase indicated

==== North Group ====
Pos	Team	Pld	W	D	L	GF	GA	GD	Pts	Qualification	DOX	NIK	ETH
1	Doxa Dramas (Q)	4	3	1	0	10	0	+10	11	Final round		1–0	7–0
2	Niki Volos	4	2	1	1	12	2	+10	9		0–0		9–0
3	Ethnikos Alexandroupolis	4	0	0	4	1	21	−20	4		0–2	1–3	

Source: rsssf
(Q) Qualified for the phase indicated

== Final round ==
=== League table ===
Pos	Team	Pld	W	D	L	GF	GA	GD	Pts
1	Olympiacos (C)	18	13	2	3	42	11	+31	46
2	Panathinaikos	18	14	0	4	41	13	+28	46
3	Apollon Athens	18	11	2	5	38	23	+15	42
4	PAOK	18	9	1	8	28	25	+3	37
5	Doxa Drama	18	5	7	6	31	31	0	35
6	Ethnikos Piraeus (Note: Ethnikos Piraeus was disqualified from the championship, after a controversial decision, 4 matches before the end of the season. Those matches counted as defeats without a match and Ethnikos got -1 point for each match.)	18	9	2	7	23	22	+1	34
7	Aris	18	5	6	7	23	24	−1	34
8	Panionios	18	6	3	9	30	28	+2	33
9	Proodeftiki	18	4	5	9	26	36	−10	31
10	Panargiakos (Note: Panargiakos Argos have 2 points deducted.)	18	0	0	18	7	76	−69	16

Source: rsssf
(C) Champions

=== Results ===
Home \ Away	OLY	PAO	APOL	PAOK	DOX	ETH	ARIS	PGSS	PRO	PAN
Olympiacos		2–1	2–0	4–0	2–2	0–1	2–0	2–0	3–0	5–0
Panathinaikos	1–0		4–2	3–1	3–0	2–0 (Note: Ethnikos Piraeus' last 4 matches were not held due to its punishment and lost them all with a 2–0 score.)	2–1	3–1	2–0	6–0
Apollon Athens	0–0	2–1		3–1	2–1	2–0	0–0	2–1	2–1	8–0
PAOK	2–1	0–1	1–2		0–2	1–0	3–1	1–2	3–1	2–0 (Note: Panargiakos withdrew from its last 2 matches, which were secured with a score of 2–0 in favor of Aris and PAOK respectively.)
Doxa Drama	2–3	0–1	2–4	1–4		2–0	2–2	1–1	3–3	4–1
Ethnikos Piraeus	0–2	2–1	1–5	2–1	0–0		3–1	1–1	3–1	1–0
Aris	0–2	2–0	2–0	0–0	2–2	0–1		2–3	1–1	2–0
Panionios	1–2	0–2	3–1	1–3	2–3	0–1	0–1		2–2	4–0
Proodeftiki	0–4	0–2	2–1	1–2	1–1	2–1	2–2	0–3		5–1
Panargiakos	1–6	0–6	1–2	0–3	0–3	1–6	1–4	1–5	0–4	

Source: rsssf
Legend: Blue = home team win; Yellow = draw; Red = away team win.

=== Championship play-offs ===
Summary
Team 1	Agg.	Team 2	1st leg	2nd leg
Olympiacos	1–0	Panathinaikos	0–0	1–0

15 July 1957

Olympiacos	0–0 (a.e.t.)	Panathinaikos
	Report

AEK Stadium, Nea Filadelfeia
Referee: Gottfried Dienst (Switzerland)

==== Replay match ====
18 July 1957

Olympiacos	1–0	Panathinaikos
Mesologitis 46'	Report

AEK Stadium, Nea Filadelfeia
Referee: Gottfried Dienst (Switzerland)

Olympiacos won 1–0 on aggregate.

== Top scorers ==
Rank	Player	Club	Goals
1	(Greece) Petros Christofidis	Proodeftiki	15
2	(Greece) Thanasis Saravakos	Panionios	11
3	(Greece) Elias Yfantis	Olympiacos	10
3	(Greece) Lakis Sofianos	Panathinaikos	10
5	(Greece) Giorgos Kamaras	Apollon Athens	9
6	(Greece) Savvas Papazoglou	Apollon Athens	8
6	(Greece) Vangelis Panakis	Panathinaikos	8
6	(Greece) Lambis Kouikouridis	PAOK	8
6	(Greece) Giorgos Chavanidis	PAOK	8
6	(Greece) Christos Karaoulanis	Ethnikos Piraeus	8
6	(Greece) Giorgos Kansos	Proodeftiki	8
