= 1958–59 Greek Football Cup =

1958–59 Greek Cup
Tournament details
- Country: Greece

Final positions
- Champions: Olympiacos (8th title)
- Runners-up: Doxa Drama

The 1958–59 Greek Football Cup was the 17th edition of the Greek Football Cup. The competition culminated with the Greek Cup Final, held at Leoforos Alexandras Stadium, Athens on 5 July 1959. The match was contested by Olympiacos and Doxa Drama, with Olympiacos winning by 2–1.

== Calendar ==
From Round of 32 onwards:

Round	Date(s)	Fixtures	Clubs	New entries
Round of 32	25 March 1959	16	32 → 16	none
Round of 16	26 April, 13 May 1959	9	16 → 8	none
Quarter-finals	24, 27 May 1959	5	8 → 4	none
Semi-finals	1959	3	4 → 2	none
Final	5 July 1959	1	2 → 1	none

== Knockout phase ==
In the knockout phase, teams play against each other over a single match. If the match ends up as a draw, extra time will be played and if the match remains a draw a replay match is set at the home of the guest team which the extra time rule stands as well. If a winner doesn't occur after the replay match the winner emerges by a flip of a coin.

== Bracket ==
Round of 32
Olympiacos Chalkida	2
Fostiras	0
Achilleas Triandria	1
Apollon Athens	2
Panamvrakikos Arta	3
Panegialios	1
Pannafpliakos	3
Proodeftiki	1
Panargiakos	1
AEK Athens (a.e.t.)	4
Panathinaikos	6
Atromitos Piraeus	1
Ergotelis	1
OFI	0
Diagoras	0
Olympiacos	5
Apollon Serres	3
Doxa Drama	5
Megas Alexandros Katerini	3
Iraklis	1
Aspida Xanthi	0	1
PAOK	0	5
Filippoi Kavala	1
Apollon Kalamarias	0
Panachaiki	0
Ethnikos Piraeus	1
Panionios (w/o)	2
Egaleo	0
Niki Volos	5
Anagennisi Karditsa	0
Vermio Veria	0
Aris	1

Round of 16
Olympiacos Chalkida	1
Apollon Athens (a.e.t.)	2
Panamvrakikos Arta	1
Pannafpliakos	0
AEK Athens	0	1
Panathinaikos	0	0
Ergotelis	0
Olympiacos	2
Doxa Drama	1
Megas Alexandros Katerini	0
PAOK	1
Filippoi Kavala	0
Ethnikos Piraeus	2
Panionios	3
Niki Volos	1
Aris	0

Quarter-finals
Apollon Athens	6
Panamvrakikos Arta	1
AEK Athens	2	1
Olympiacos	2	3
Doxa Drama	1
PAOK	0
Panionios	2
Niki Volos	1

Semi-finals
Apollon Athens	1	0
Olympiacos	1	2
Doxa Drama	2
Panionios	1

Final
Olympiacos	2
Doxa Drama	1

== Round of 32 ==
Team 1	Score/Agg.	Team 2	Match	Replay
Niki Volos	5–0	Anagennisi Karditsa		
Megas Alexandros Katerini	3–1	Iraklis		
Pannafpliakos	3–1	Proodeftiki		
Achilleas Triandria	1–2	Apollon Athens		
Ergotelis	1–0	OFI		
Olympiacos Chalkida	2–0	Fostiras		
Filippoi Kavala	1–0	Apollon Kalamarias		
Apollon Serres	3–5	Doxa Drama		
Diagoras	0–5	Olympiacos		
Panachaiki	0–1	Ethnikos Piraeus		
Vermio Veria	0–1	Aris		
Panargiakos	1–4 (a.e.t.)	AEK Athens		
Aspida Xanthi	1–5	PAOK	0–0 (a.e.t.)	1–5
Panamvrakikos Arta	3–1	Panegialios		
Panathinaikos	6–1	Atromitos Piraeus		
Panionios	2–0 (w/o)^{*}	Egaleo		

^{*}Suspended at the 70th minute at the expense of Egaleo and was awarded to Panionios.

== Round of 16 ==
Team 1	Score/Agg.	Team 2	Match	Replay
AEK Athens	1–0	Panathinaikos	0–0^{*}	1–0
Ethnikos Piraeus	2–3	Panionios		
Ergotelis	0–2	Olympiacos		
Panamvrakikos Arta	1–0	Pannafpliakos		
Olympiacos Chalkida	1–2 (a.e.t.)	Apollon Athens		
Doxa Drama	1–0	Megas Alexandros Katerini		
PAOK	1–0	Filippoi Kavala		
Niki Volos	1–0	Aris		

^{*}Suspended at the 53rd minute. The replay match was set at the neutral ground, Karaiskakis Stadium.

== Quarter-finals ==
Team 1	Score/Agg.	Team 2	Match	Replay
Panionios	2–1	Niki Volos		
Apollon Athens	6–1	Panamvrakikos Arta		
Doxa Drama	1–0	PAOK		
AEK Athens	3–5	Olympiacos	2–2 (a.e.t.)	1–3

== Semi-finals ==
Team 1	Score/Agg.	Team 2	Match	Replay
Doxa Drama	2–1	Panionios		
Apollon Athens	1–3	Olympiacos	1–1 (a.e.t.)	0–2

== Final ==
5 July 1959
17:30 EET

Olympiacos	2–1	Doxa Drama
Christoforidis 52'; Bebis* 59'	Report	Georgiadis 47'

Leoforos Alexandras Stadium, Ampelokipoi
Attendance: 25,000
Referee: Dimosthenis Stathatos (Athens)

^{*}Greek FA's official site mention Yfantis as the scorer.
