= Vasilios Xanthopoulos (footballer) =

Greek footballer

Personal information
- Date of birth: 3 April 1930
- Date of death: 22 July 1998 (aged 68)

International career
Years	Team	Apps	(Gls)
1954–1957	Greece	3	(0)

Vasilios Xanthopoulos (3 April 1930 – 22 July 1998) was a Greek footballer. He played in three matches for the Greece national football team from 1954 to 1957. He was also part of Greece's team for their qualification matches for the 1954 FIFA World Cup.
