= Giannis Ioannou (footballer, born 1931) =

Greek footballer

Personal information
- Date of birth: 1931
- Place of birth: Piraeus, Greece
- Position: Attacking midfielder

Senior career*
Years	Team	Apps	(Gls)
–1952	Ethnikos Piraeus		
1953–1960	Olympiakos	81	(24)

International career
1950–1957	Greece	12	(0)
- * Club domestic league appearances and goals

Giannis Ioannou (Greek: Ιωάννης Ιωάννου; born 1931) is a Greek footballer. He competed in the men's tournament at the 1952 Summer Olympics.

He started playing football in Ethnikos Piraeus and then, in 1953, he was transferred to Olympiacos F.C. where he played until 1960.

== Honours ==
With Olympiacos:

- Greek Championship: 1954, 1955, 1956, 1957, 1958 και 1959
- Greek Cup: 1954, 1957, 1958, 1959 και 1960
- Piraeus League: 1954, 1955, 1956, 1957, 1958 και 1959
