= A.P.S. Aspida Xanthi =

Greek athletic club

Aspida Xanthi
- Full name: Athlitikos Politistikos Syllogos Aspis Xanthi (Athletic and Cultural Club Aspis Xanthi)
- Nickname: Κυανόλευκοι (The Blue-Whites)
- Founded: 1922
- Ground: Municipal Ground of Xanthi
- Chairman: Apostolos Paslakis
- Manager: Nikos Chatziparaskevas
- League: Xanthi FCA First Division
- 2025–26: Xanthi FCA First Division, 3rd
Home colours	Away colours

A.P.S. Aspida Xanthi (Athletic and Cultural Club Aspida Xanthi) is an athletic club in the city of Xanthi, Greece. It was founded in 1922. It maintains departments of football and basketball. Its name means shield and its colours are cyan and white.

The football team of the club participated in the 1939–40 Panhellenic Championship. During the next decades the team was playing mostly in the Second Division, while in the 1956–57 Greek Cup was eliminated at the quarter-finals.

In 1967, the team was merged with the other football club of the city, Orfeas Xanthi, and formed Xanthi. However, after the end of the Greek military junta, the football team was formed again.
