= Thanasis Kingley =

Greek footballer and manager (1928–2004)

Personal information
- Full name: Athanasios Kingley
- Date of birth: 1928
- Place of birth: Athens, Greece
- Date of death: 6 May 2004 (aged 75–76)
- Position: Defender

Senior career*
| Years | Team | Apps | (Gls) |
| 1945–1951 | Panachaiki | | |
| 1951–1959 | Olympiacos | 89 | (0) |

International career
| 1953–1954 | Greece | 5 | (0) |

Managerial career
- Atromitos
- Vyzas Megara
- 1967: Proodeftiki
- 1967–1968: Olympiacos
- 1968–1970: Egaleo
- Proodeftiki
- 1971–1972: OFI
- AEL
- 1975: Kalamata
- Olympiacos Volos
- Kozani
- Pelopas Kiato
- Ionikos
- Kallithea
- 1978: Pierikos
- Proodeftiki
- * Club domestic league appearances and goals

Thanasis Kingley (Greek: Θανάσης Κίνλεϊ; 1928 – 6 May 2004) was a Greek footballer and a later manager. He played in five matches for the Greece national football team from 1953 to 1954. He was also part of Greece's team for their qualification matches for the 1954 FIFA World Cup.
