= Fostiras F.C. =

Fostiras
- Full name: Fostiras Football Club
- Nickname: Φονέας των Γιγάντων (Slayer of Giants)
- Founded: 12 December 1926; 99 years ago
- Ground: Spyros Gialampidis Stadium
- Capacity: 4,000
- Chairman: Stamatis Kazantzis
- Manager: Giannis Taprantzis
- League: Athens FCA First Division
- 2025–26: Athens FCA First Division (Group 2), 2nd
Home colours	Away colours	Third colours

Fostiras Football Club (Greek: Α.Π.Ο. Φωστήρας Ταύρου) is a Greek football club based in Tavros, a suburb of Athens, Greece. They played Alpha Ethniki between 1960 and 1963 and again between 1970 and 1974.

== History ==
=== First years ===
In 1926, a football club was established in the area of Neon Sfagion in the municipality of Tavros, owned by Emmanouil Benakis and the majority of Asia Minor refugees, following the decision of young football refugees. Among others were: Sp. Gialampidis, G. Vavoulas, Th. Vafiadis, C.E. Apostolidis, Vafiadis, I. Mavropoulos, K. Mavropoulos, Panag. Papadopoulos, G. Axarlis, St. Moschidis, Chr. Chatzopoulos, G. Zarifis, etc. The general leader and driving force of the club was G. Vavoulas, due to its rapid development and its establishment as a major sports club in the district. The name of the group was inspired by Chr. Hatzopoulos from Constantinople. It may have been inspired by the name Fostir that existed in the Constantinople during the 1923-24 season. The colours of the club were defined as yellow and black, which were Byzantine colours. The club's original emblem was the Phoenix which was later abolished because it was associated with the 1967 Greek junta.

The first match of the club mentioned was on 30 January 1927 against Atromitos Neapolis (Exarchia) and ended 2-2. Relates to:

"The Atromitos (Neapolis) and Fostir (Sfagion) teams met at the Neon Sfagion stadium. After a nice match they showed a 2-2 draw. Atromitos played with: Tzonakis, Kampouropoulos G. Angelatos and A. Melanitis and from Fostir, Vafoulas and Markopoulos." Initially there was no BoD. and the players were also the management. Later, the Board of Directors was created and Char. Vafiadis was the first president. Vafiadis from 1927 to January 1930 and at that time had about 150 members. Vafiadis was succeeded by F. Katsinas as president of the club.

Until their official recognition and participation in the official championships, they played in a multitude of friendly matches with the official and non-Athenian clubs of Piraeus, for the most part. The first team of Fostiras, which remained almost the same until the beginning of the 1930s, consisted of the following players: S. Ladonikolas, Zaridis, I. Mavropoulos, O. Christofidis, Th. P. Papadopoulos, S. Moschidis, T. Vafiadis, Halvas, Sarigoulis, S. Diamantopoulos, K. Mavropoulos, G. Perivolarakis. In 1930, they were coached by Paschalidis. This team gradually gained a great reputation, as it remained unbeaten in matches with unofficial clubs until 1930. It began to invite nearby areas, such as Chalkida (where it defeated Olympic champion 4-3), Salamis (where it beat the local Salamis Association 5-0). In 1928 he finished 2nd in tournaments of 24 independent clubs. By the summer of 1930, they joined ESPA had scored 32 wins, 3 draws and only one defeat and had a goal difference of 119-26. In some of his victories he has scored impressive goals, such as: Doxa Koukaki 6-0, Ethniki Kolonos 6-3, Akrites Drapetsona 4-0, Pera Club 5-0, Niki Plakas 6-3, Petralona 3-0, Chalkidona 4-1, 2nd Apollo Athens 3-1, Neapolis 10-0 Union, Philadelphia 5-0 Union, Thissio Union 4-0, Neo Astir Peristeri 3-0 etc.

The Athletic Association of Neon Sfagion: Fostiras' main competitor in the district was the "Athletic Association of Neon Sfagion" (AEN), from which it suffered its first defeat in 1930 by 1-2, since then was undefeated. AEN was founded in September 1929 by brothers Stefanos, Nikolaos and Panagis Kristalidis, Ant. Antoniadis and Eleftherios Iatrellis. They immediately set up their own regular-sized stadium and started racing with other unofficial clubs. In the 1929-30 season, they had 10 wins, 6 draws and 3 defeats. Most impressive was the win over Fostiras, who was undefeated for three years. In the core team of AEN G. Zarifis (goalkeeper), K. Baketatzis, Al. Kalafatis (defenders), N. Lazaratos, Ant. Pouloudis, Evang. Fournakis (midfielders), M. Krystallalidis, N. Eleftheriadis, N. Voutsas, I. Serafimidis, Styl. Thravalos (forwards).

=== FCA Athens first participations ===
Fostir of Neon Sfagion in 1931 officially joined the FCA Athens as a recognized association and started its official racing course from the Division III championship season 1931-32. The first official championship match in its history was against SA. Halandri in Chalandri on October 25, 1931 for the premiere of the Division C championship, where he won 2-2. In the 1938-39 season, he won promotion to the Second Division of the FCA Athens, where it fought until the last pre-war season 1940-41, interrupted by the war. He began to create his legend in the early post-war years, when he first joined the FCA Athens, where he fought successfully throughout the 1950s and 1960s, with opponents of AEK, Panathinaikos, Apollon Athens, Panionios, Egaleo, Athinaikos, Atromitos Peristeri etc.

=== Slayer of Giants ===
In the first postwar period in the team were: Spyros Gialampidis, Stamatis Tsiskakis, Dimitsanas, Pilatos, Chatzigiannis, Mantalopoulos, Bebis, Neofytou, Mylonakis, Fabritsis, Kaparitsis, Dimasanitsis, Kaparatzian, Tsalavoutas, Tsalatzis Pavlidis, Exapichidis, Bobotas etc. At that time he managed to retain the A Division, having defeated the major league teams. The club subsequently became known as the “Giant Killer”. The nickname was referenced in a poem recited by the club’s special secretary, Manikas, at an end-of-season gathering in June 1949:

"Fostir for all is a brilliant ornament, divine is one of the most ancient with a history club. In the beginning he got into big stadiums and swallowed so much bitterness and so much more. But he never despaired and never did as everyone confessed to the Giants Slayer."

Their best season at FCA Athens were:

1945-46: 4th with 36 points, just two behind AEK champion and Asteras champion and one of Panathinaikos champions.

1948-49: 3rd to 36th, five behind champion Panathinaikos and three behind Panionios

1951-52: 4th to 19b.

1955-56: 2nd with 29 b. It was the best season in its history. He qualified for the final of the 1955-56 Greek Championship, where he competed in the second group (central) and finished 4th in 5 teams.

They also had a significant presence in the Greek Cup, where they reached the quarter-finals four times:

1948-49: Olympiacos eliminated on repeat: 3-3, 1-4

1952-53: Olympiacos again beats 1-3

1956-57: Panathinaikos is eliminated by 1-2

1957-58: Wrestled by Doxa Drama 1-3.

== Stadium ==
The stadium of Fostiras is the Tavros Stadium (or Spyros Gialampidis Stadium), with a capacity of 4,000 spectators. It belongs to the Municipality of Tavros and is close to the train lines. It was named "Spyros Gialampidis" in honor of Fostiras' former player.

It was built in 1969 and has an official spectator record of 11,000 in a game against Olympiacos race in 1971. Unofficially, the number is likely to be higher, as in many games people used to enter the fences. It features two wooden removable stands, which were installed in 2002, replacing older ones. Despite its layout, reminiscent of the 1960s, it has a boutique, a café and a clubhouse.

== Nickname ==
Fostiras gained their "Slayer of the Giants" nickname in the 1940s because of their fighting spirit against stronger opponents.

== Supporters ==
Fostiras' fans named Yellow Army Gate 2 where they are twins with the fans of Nea Ionia (Refugees Gate 2).

== Honours ==
Fostiras F.C. honours
Type	Competition	Titles	Winners	Runners-up
Domestic	Beta Ethniki (Second-tier)	1	1969–70	
Domestic	Gamma Ethniki (Third-tier)	1	2012–13	
Domestic	Delta Ethniki (Fourth-tier)	5^{s}	1990–91, 1993-94, 2000–01, 2005–06, 2011–12	
Regional	Greek FCA Winners' Championship	1	1959–60	
Regional	Athens FCA First Division	1	2018–19	
Regional	Athens FCA Cup	3^{s}	2005–06, 2006–07, 2011–12	

- record
- ^{S} Shared record

== Sources ==
- "Luminary N. Slaughterhouses" long. "Evening", 23 and 24 July 1930.
- C. Diakogianni, "Football", ed CACTUS, 1978, pp. 83.
- "40 years and Propo Greek football," special edition of Proporama, 1999.
- "Sports Voice" of 27 November 1961.
