= Kostas Polychroniou =

Greek footballer and manager

Personal information
- Full name: Konstantinos Polychroniou
- Date of birth: 12 November 1936
- Place of birth: Platanistos, Euboea, Greece
- Date of death: 1 June 2018 (aged 81)
- Position: Midfielder

Youth career
- 1951–1953: Pampaianiakos Paiania

Senior career*
Years	Team	Apps	(Gls)
1954–1968	Olympiacos	305	(13)

International career
1957–1967	Greece	27	(0)
1960	Greece Olympic	3	(0)

Managerial career
- 1979–1980: AEL
- 1981–1982: Rodos
- 1983–1984: Doxa Drama
- 1984: Apollon Athens
- 1987: Levadiakos
- 1992–1994: Greece U21
- 1993–1994: Olympiacos
- 1994–1998: Greece
- 1999: Ionikos
- 2001: Paniliakos
- * Club domestic league appearances and goals

Konstantinos Polychroniou (Greek: Κώστας Πολυχρονίου; 12 November 1936 – 1 June 2018), better known as Kostas Polychroniou, was a Greek professional football player and manager.

== Career ==
Born in Platanistos, Euboea, Polychroniou's family moved to Athens when he was six months old. Polychroniou is considered as one-club man spending his entire career playing for the Greek giants Olympiacos F.C. making 305 appearances in Alpha Ethniki and a total of 662 caps in all competitions (also including 239 friendly games). He also earned six greek championships (1956, 1957, 1958, 1959, 1965–66, 1966–67) and 8 Greek Cups (1956–57, 1957–58, 1958–59, 1959–60, 1960–61, 1962–63, 1964–65, 1967–68).

Kostas Polychroniou capped 27 times for Greece.

He managed AEL, Rodos, Doxa Drama, Apollon Athens, Levadiakos, Olympiacos, Greece, Ionikos, Paniliakos.

== See also ==
- List of one-club men in association football
