= Atromitos Piraeus F.C. =

Atromitos Piraeus
- Full name: Podosfairikos Athlitikos Omilos Atromitos Piraeus
- Nickname: Κυανόλευκοι (The Blue-Whites)
- Founded: 1926; 100 years ago
- Ground: Rentis Stadium "Stavros Melissourgos"
- Capacity: 500
- Chairman: Thomas Stamopoulos
- Manager: Konstantinos Arzenis
- League: Piraeus FCA First Division
- 2025–26: Piraeus FCA First Division Group 2, 11th
Home colours	Away colours

Atromitos Piraeus Football Club (Greek: Π.Α.Ο. Ατρόμητος Πειραιώς) is a Greek football club based in Piraeus, Greece.

The club was founded in 1926. They are currently competing in the Local Championship of Piraeus after having been relegated from the third tier of the Greek football league system, Gamma Ethniki.

== History ==
Atromitos Piraeus team - 1946

Atromitos Piraeus was founded by residents of Kaminia neighbourhood in Piraeus, such as Moiras, Skordilis and the photographer Keleris. Before World War II and during the German occupation the existence of the team played an important role for the development and advancement of amateur football.

Originally home ground of the team was Karaiskakis Stadium and afterwards Proodeutiki Stadium, Renti Municipal Stadium and Kaminia Municipal Stadium.

Atromitos finished second behind Olympiacos in the 1947 Piraeus championship, thus earning the right to compete in the national championship. In the national championship, Atromitos finished fourth among six teams. This is Atromitos best finish ever.

Team started from Piraeus regional football leagues and went as far as Alpha Ethniki at 1960-61 season as previous year champion of B Ethniki.

From the 1962 to 1979 season, Atromitos played in B Ethniki, where it frequently achieved strong finishes in the final standings.

== Honours ==
=== Domestic ===
- Second Division: 1
  - 1959–60
- Fourth Division: 1
  - 1980–81
- Pireaus Champions: 8
  - 1959–60, 1995–96, 1998–99, 1999–00, 2004–05, 2009–10, 2017–18, 2022–23
- Pireaus Cup Winners: 4
  - 1987–88, 1999–00, 2004–05, 2011–12
