= List of AEK Athens F.C. managers =

AEK Athens F.C. is a professional football club based in Nea Filadelfeia, Athens, Greece, which plays in Super League Greece. This chronological list comprises all those who have held the position of manager of the first team of AEK Athens from 1927, when the first professional manager was appointed, to the present day. Each manager's entry includes his dates of tenure and the club's overall competitive record (in terms of matches won, drawn and lost), honours won and significant achievements while under his care. Caretaker managers are included, where known. The club had sixty-seven different managers from across the globe throughout their hundred-year existence.

== Managerial history ==
Kostas Negrepontis, has recorded eleven consecutive seasons as manager and a total of sixteen seasons in four spells, which is the most in the club's history. Dušan Bajević holds the record for the most trophies won by a manager, as he won four Greek Championships, one Greek Cup, one Greek League Cup and one Greek Super Cup.

Season	Nat.	Image	Name	From	To	Competition	Pld	W	D	L	GF	GA	GD	W%	Honours
1928–29	(Hungary)		József Schweng	1928	1931	AFCA	9	6	2	1	19	9	+10	66.67	—
1929–30	(Hungary)		József Schweng	1928	1931	AFCA	10	7	2	1	36	6	+30	70.00	—
1930–31	(Hungary)		József Schweng	1928	1931	AFCA	6	5	0	1	17	13	+4	83.33	—
1930–31	(Hungary)		József Schweng	1928	1931	Panhellenic Championship	14	5	3	6	19	31	-12	35.71	—
1930–31	(Hungary)		József Schweng	1928	1931	Total	39	23	7	9	91	59	+32	58.97	—
1931–32	(Hungary) (Germany)		Emil Rauchmaul	1931	1932	Greek Cup	4	4	0	0	13	4	+9	100.00	Greek Cup: 1
1931–32	(Hungary) (Germany)		Emil Rauchmaul	1931	1932	Panhellenic Championship	14	4	1	9	13	35	-22	28.57	Greek Cup: 1
1931–32	(Hungary) (Germany)		Emil Rauchmaul	1931	1932	Relegation play-offs	2	1	1	0	5	3	+2	50.00	Greek Cup: 1
1931–32	(Hungary) (Germany)		Emil Rauchmaul	1931	1932	Total	20	9	2	9	31	42	-11	45.00	Greek Cup: 1
1932–33	(Greece) (Ottoman Empire)		Themos Asderis	1932	1933	Panhellenic Championship Southern Group	8	4	2	2	17	14	+3	50.00	—
1932–33	(Greece) (Ottoman Empire)		Themos Asderis	1932	1933	Panhellenic Championship	3	0	0	3	2	7	-5	00.00	—
1932–33	(Greece) (Ottoman Empire)		Themos Asderis	1932	1933	Greek Cup^{ET}	3	1	1	1	4	3	+1	33.33	—
1932–33	(Greece) (Ottoman Empire)		Themos Asderis	1932	1933	Total	14	5	3	6	23	24	-1	35.71	—
1933–34	(Greece) (Ottoman Empire)		Kostas Negrepontis	1933	1936	AFCA	10	3	4	3	14	15	-1	30.00	—
1933–34	(Greece) (Ottoman Empire)		Kostas Negrepontis	1933	1936	Panhellenic Championship Southern Group	10	1	1	8	9	30	-21	10.00	—
1934–35	(Greece) (Ottoman Empire)		Kostas Negrepontis	1933	1936	AFCA	2	2	0	0	4	0	+4	100.00	—
1934–35	(Greece) (Ottoman Empire)		Kostas Negrepontis	1933	1936	Panhellenic Championship Southern Group	10	2	3	5	14	23	-9	20.00	—
1935–36	(Greece) (Ottoman Empire)		Kostas Negrepontis	1933	1936	Panhellenic Championship	14	4	5	5	17	22	-5	28.57	—
1935–36	(Greece) (Ottoman Empire)		Kostas Negrepontis	1933	1936	Total	46	12	13	21	58	90	-32	26.09	—
1936–37	(Greece) (Ottoman Empire)		Themos Asderis	1936	1937	AFCA	10	8	0	2	33	12	+21	80.00	—
1937–38	(Greece) (Ottoman Empire)		Kostas Negrepontis	1937	1948	AFCA	10	8	0	2	33	12	+21	80.00	Greek League: 2 Greek Cup: 1 AFCA: 3
1938–39	(Greece) (Ottoman Empire)		Kostas Negrepontis	1937	1948	AFCA	10	7	1	2	31	13	+18	70.00	Greek League: 2 Greek Cup: 1 AFCA: 3
1938–39	(Greece) (Ottoman Empire)		Kostas Negrepontis	1937	1948	Panhellenic Championship Southern Group (Note: The clubs from the Athens did not face each other again, but the results from AFCA counted instead.)	6	5	0	1	26	9	+17	83.33	Greek League: 2 Greek Cup: 1 AFCA: 3
1938–39	(Greece) (Ottoman Empire)		Kostas Negrepontis	1937	1948	Panhellenic Championship	2	2	0	0	7	3	+4	100.00	Greek League: 2 Greek Cup: 1 AFCA: 3
1938–39	(Greece) (Ottoman Empire)		Kostas Negrepontis	1937	1948	Greek Cup	4	4	0	0	14	3	+11	100.00	Greek League: 2 Greek Cup: 1 AFCA: 3
1939–40	(Greece) (Ottoman Empire)		Kostas Negrepontis	1937	1948	AFCA	14	13	1	0	57	10	+47	92.86	Greek League: 2 Greek Cup: 1 AFCA: 3
1939–40	(Greece) (Ottoman Empire)		Kostas Negrepontis	1937	1948	Panhellenic Championship Southern Group	6	5	0	1	22	7	+15	83.33	Greek League: 2 Greek Cup: 1 AFCA: 3
1939–40	(Greece) (Ottoman Empire)		Kostas Negrepontis	1937	1948	Panhellenic Championship	2	2	0	0	5	3	+2	100.00	Greek League: 2 Greek Cup: 1 AFCA: 3
1939–40	(Greece) (Ottoman Empire)		Kostas Negrepontis	1937	1948	Greek Cup^{ET}	4	2	2	0	12	4	+8	50.00	Greek League: 2 Greek Cup: 1 AFCA: 3
1940–41	(Greece) (Ottoman Empire)		Kostas Negrepontis	1937	1948	AFCA (Note: Not finished.)	3	3	0	0	12	2	+10	100.00	Greek League: 2 Greek Cup: 1 AFCA: 3
1944–45	(Greece) (Ottoman Empire)		Kostas Negrepontis	1937	1948	AFCA	6	5	1	0	30	5	+25	83.33	Greek League: 2 Greek Cup: 1 AFCA: 3
1945–46	(Greece) (Ottoman Empire)		Kostas Negrepontis	1937	1948	AFCA	15	11	1	3	49	19	+31	73.33	Greek League: 2 Greek Cup: 1 AFCA: 3
1945–46	(Greece) (Ottoman Empire)		Kostas Negrepontis	1937	1948	Panhellenic Championship	4	1	2	1	3	5	-2	25.00	Greek League: 2 Greek Cup: 1 AFCA: 3
1946–47	(Greece) (Ottoman Empire)		Kostas Negrepontis	1937	1948	AFCA	14	10	1	3	29	12	+17	71.43	Greek League: 2 Greek Cup: 1 AFCA: 3
1946–47	(Greece) (Ottoman Empire)		Kostas Negrepontis	1937	1948	Panhellenic Championship	10	4	1	5	15	16	-1	40.00	Greek League: 2 Greek Cup: 1 AFCA: 3
1946–47	(Greece) (Ottoman Empire)		Kostas Negrepontis	1937	1948	Greek Cup	1	0	0	1	1	2	-1	00.00	Greek League: 2 Greek Cup: 1 AFCA: 3
1947–48	(Greece) (Ottoman Empire)		Kostas Negrepontis	1937	1948	AFCA	14	7	2	5	31	23	+8	50.00	Greek League: 2 Greek Cup: 1 AFCA: 3
1947–48	(Greece) (Ottoman Empire)		Kostas Negrepontis	1937	1948	Greek Cup^{ET}	3	2	0	1	6	5	+1	66.67	Greek League: 2 Greek Cup: 1 AFCA: 3
1947–48	(Greece) (Ottoman Empire)		Kostas Negrepontis	1937	1948	Total	128	91	12	25	383	153	+230	71.09	Greek League: 2 Greek Cup: 1 AFCA: 3
1948–49	(England)		Jack Beby	1948–10–04	1951–02–07	AFCA	16	6	7	3	28	16	+12	37.50	Greek Cup: 2 AFCA: 1
1948–49	(England)		Jack Beby	1948–10–04	1951–02–07	Greek Cup^{ET}	5	4	1	0	17	4	+13	80.00	Greek Cup: 2 AFCA: 1
1949–50	(England)		Jack Beby	1948–10–04	1951–02–07	AFCA	18	13	2	3	37	16	+21	72.22	Greek Cup: 2 AFCA: 1
1949–50	(England)		Jack Beby	1948–10–04	1951–02–07	Greek Cup^{ET}	10	6	4	0	35	5	+30	60.00	Greek Cup: 2 AFCA: 1
1950–51	(England)		Jack Beby	1948–10–04	1951–02–07	AFCA	10	5	2	3	12	8	+4	50.00	Greek Cup: 2 AFCA: 1
1950–51	(England)		Jack Beby	1948–10–04	1951–02–07	Greek Cup	2	1	0	1	2	4	-2	50.00	Greek Cup: 2 AFCA: 1
1950–51	(England)		Jack Beby	1948–10–04	1951–02–07	Total	61	35	16	10	131	53	+78	57.38	Greek Cup: 2 AFCA: 1
1950–51	(Greece) (Ottoman Empire)		Tryfon Tzanetis^{CT}	1951–02–09	1951–09–19	—									—
1951–52	(Italy)		Mario Magnozzi	1951–09–20	1953–07–29	AFCA	10	6	2	2	23	13	+10	60.00	—
1951–52	(Italy)		Mario Magnozzi	1951–09–20	1953–07–29	Greek Cup^{ET}	4	1	2	1	7	3	+4	25.00	—
1952–53	(Italy)		Mario Magnozzi	1951–09–20	1953–07–29	AFCA	9	5	1	3	23	10	+13	55.56	—
1952–53	(Italy)		Mario Magnozzi	1951–09–20	1953–07–29	Greek Cup^{ET}	4	3	0	1	9	5	+4	75.00	—
1952–53	(Italy)		Mario Magnozzi	1951–09–20	1953–07–29	Total	27	15	5	7	62	31	+31	55.56	—
1953–54	(Greece) (Ottoman Empire)		Georgios Daispangos	1953–07–30	1954–12–31	AFCA	10	4	4	2	15	8	+7	40.00	—
1953–54	(Greece) (Ottoman Empire)		Georgios Daispangos	1953–07–30	1954–12–31	Panhellenic Championship	10	4	3	3	15	17	-2	40.00	—
1953–54	(Greece) (Ottoman Empire)		Georgios Daispangos	1953–07–30	1954–12–31	Greek Cup^{ET}	2	0	1	1	0	1	-1	00.00	—
1954–55	(Greece) (Ottoman Empire)		Georgios Daispangos	1953–07–30	1954–12–31	AFCA (1)	10	6	0	4	16	9	+7	60.00	—
1954–55	(Greece) (Ottoman Empire)		Georgios Daispangos	1953–07–30	1954–12–31	Total	32	14	8	10	46	35	+11	43.75	—
1954–55	(England)		Ted Crawford	1955–01–01	1955–10–30	AFCA (2)	4	3	1	0	10	4	+6	75.00	—
1954–55	(England)		Ted Crawford	1955–01–01	1955–10–30	Greek Cup^{ET}	3	1	1	1	5	4	+1	33.33	—
1955–56	(England)		Ted Crawford	1955–01–01	1955–10–30	AFCA (1)	5	1	1	3	3	5	-2	20.00	—
1955–56	(England)		Ted Crawford	1955–01–01	1955–10–30	Total	12	5	3	4	18	13	+5	41.67	—
1955–56	(Greece) (Ottoman Empire)		Kostas Negrepontis	1955–11–02	1957–01–29	AFCA (2)	9	3	2	4	12	14	-2	33.33	Greek Cup: 1
1955–56	(Greece) (Ottoman Empire)		Kostas Negrepontis	1955–11–02	1957–01–29	AFCA Play-offs	2	2	0	0	4	2	+2	100.00	Greek Cup: 1
1955–56	(Greece) (Ottoman Empire)		Kostas Negrepontis	1955–11–02	1957–01–29	Greek Cup	5	5	0	0	18	6	+12	100.00	Greek Cup: 1
1956–57	(Greece) (Ottoman Empire)		Kostas Negrepontis	1955–11–02	1957–01–29	AFCA	14	5	6	3	21	15	+6	35.71	Greek Cup: 1
1956–57	(Greece) (Ottoman Empire)		Kostas Negrepontis	1955–11–02	1957–01–29	Total	30	15	8	7	51	37	+14	50.00	Greek Cup: 1
1956–57	(Greece) (Ottoman Empire)		Tryfon Tzanetis	1957–02–01	1958–07–31	Greek Cup	6	5	0	1	22	3	+19	83.33	—
1957–58	(Greece) (Ottoman Empire)		Tryfon Tzanetis	1957–02–01	1958–07–31	AFCA	14	10	2	2	30	14	+16	71.43	—
1957–58	(Greece) (Ottoman Empire)		Tryfon Tzanetis	1957–02–01	1958–07–31	Panhellenic Championship	22	11	9	2	39	19	+20	50.00	—
1957–58	(Greece) (Ottoman Empire)		Tryfon Tzanetis	1957–02–01	1958–07–31	Greek Cup	7	6	0	1	29	4	+25	85.71	—
1957–58	(Greece) (Ottoman Empire)		Tryfon Tzanetis	1957–02–01	1958–07–31	Total	49	32	11	6	120	40	+80	65.31	—
1958–59	(Italy)		Rino Martini	1958–08–05	1958–11–12	AFCA (1)	9	3	6	0	11	5	+6	33.33	—
1958–59	(Greece) (Ottoman Empire)		Kostas Negrepontis	1958–11–13	1959–06–30	AFCA (2)	5	3	1	1	6	3	+3	60.00	—
1958–59	(Greece) (Ottoman Empire)		Kostas Negrepontis	1958–11–13	1959–06–30	Panhellenic Championship	18	12	4	2	39	20	+19	66.67	—
1958–59	(Greece) (Ottoman Empire)		Kostas Negrepontis	1958–11–13	1959–06–30	Greek Cup^{ET}	4	2	1	1	8	6	+2	50.00	—
1958–59	(Greece) (Ottoman Empire)		Kostas Negrepontis	1958–11–13	1959–06–30	Total	27	17	6	4	53	29	+24	62.96	—
1959–60	(Austria)		Lukas Aurednik	1959–07–17	1961–01–08	Alpha Ethniki	30	21	7	2	72	27	+45	70.00	—
1959–60	(Austria)		Lukas Aurednik	1959–07–17	1961–01–08	Alpha Ethniki Play-off	1	0	0	1	1	2	-1	00.00	—
1959–60	(Austria)		Lukas Aurednik	1959–07–17	1961–01–08	Greek Cup	7	6	0	1	26	5	+21	85.71	—
1960–61	(Austria)		Lukas Aurednik	1959–07–17	1961–01–08	Alpha Ethniki (1)	12	7	1	4	24	13	+11	58.33	—
1960–61	(Austria)		Lukas Aurednik	1959–07–17	1961–01–08	Greek Cup	1	1	0	0	9	0	+9	100.00	—
1960–61	(Austria)		Lukas Aurednik	1959–07–17	1961–01–08	Total	51	35	8	8	132	47	+85	68.63	—
1960–61	(Greece) (Ottoman Empire)		Tryfon Tzanetis	1961–01–09	1962–06–30	Alpha Ethniki (2)	18	11	5	2	42	17	+25	61.11	—
1960–61	(Greece) (Ottoman Empire)		Tryfon Tzanetis	1961–01–09	1962–06–30	Greek Cup (2)	7	6	0	1	29	10	+19	85.71	—
1960–61	(Greece) (Ottoman Empire)		Tryfon Tzanetis	1961–01–09	1962–06–30	Balkans Cup (Note: The final four matches are not included since AEK did not show up.)	4	1	1	2	8	12	-4	25.00	—
1961–62	(Greece) (Ottoman Empire)		Tryfon Tzanetis	1961–01–09	1962–06–30	Alpha Ethniki	30	19	6	5	73	31	+42	63.33	—
1961–62	(Greece) (Ottoman Empire)		Tryfon Tzanetis	1961–01–09	1962–06–30	Greek Cup (Note: The match against Kalamata for the round of 32 is not included since Kalamata did not show up and it was awarded to AEK.)	1	0	0	1	1	2	-1	00.00	—
1961–62	(Greece) (Ottoman Empire)		Tryfon Tzanetis	1961–01–09	1962–06–30	Total	60	37	12	11	153	72	+81	61.67	—
1962–63	(Hungary)		Jenő Csaknády	1962–07–14	1963–07–09	Alpha Ethniki	30	20	7	3	66	21	+45	66.67	Greek League: 1
1962–63	(Hungary)		Jenő Csaknády	1962–07–14	1963–07–09	Alpha Ethniki Play-off	1	0	1	0	3	3	0	00.00	Greek League: 1
1962–63	(Hungary)		Jenő Csaknády	1962–07–14	1963–07–09	Greek Cup	3	2	0	1	10	2	+8	66.67	Greek League: 1
1962–63	(Hungary)		Jenő Csaknády	1962–07–14	1963–07–09	Total	34	22	8	4	79	26	+53	64.71	Greek League: 1
1963–64	(Austria)		Heinrich Müller	1963–08–17	1964–06–29	Alpha Ethniki	30	18	5	7	72	25	+47	60.00	Greek Cup: 1
1963–64	(Austria)		Heinrich Müller	1963–08–17	1964–06–29	Greek Cup^{ET}	4	4	0	0	14	1	+13	100.00	Greek Cup: 1
1963–64	(Austria)		Heinrich Müller	1963–08–17	1964–06–29	European Cup	2	0	1	1	3	8	-5	00.00	Greek Cup: 1
1963–64	(Austria)		Heinrich Müller	1963–08–17	1964–06–29	Total	36	22	6	8	89	34	+55	61.11	Greek Cup: 1
1964–65	(Socialist Federal Republic of Yugoslavia)		Mirko Kokotović	1964–06–30	1965–07–14	Alpha Ethniki	30	18	10	2	64	22	+42	60.00	—
1964–65	(Socialist Federal Republic of Yugoslavia)		Mirko Kokotović	1964–06–30	1965–07–14	Greek Cup	3	2	0	1	9	3	+6	66.67	—
1964–65	(Socialist Federal Republic of Yugoslavia)		Mirko Kokotović	1964–06–30	1965–07–14	European Cup Winners' Cup	2	1	0	1	2	3	-1	50.00	—
1964–65	(Socialist Federal Republic of Yugoslavia)		Mirko Kokotović	1964–06–30	1965–07–14	Total	35	21	10	4	75	28	+47	60.00	—
1965–66	(Greece) (Ottoman Empire)		Tryfon Tzanetis	1965–07–27	1966–12–23	Alpha Ethniki (Note: The away match against Panserraikos is not included since AEK did not show up and it was awarded to Panserraikos.)	29	19	5	5	58	24	+34	65.52	Greek Cup: 1
1965–66	(Greece) (Ottoman Empire)		Tryfon Tzanetis	1965–07–27	1966–12–23	Greek Cup (Note: The semi-final against Kavala and the final against Olympiacos are not included since Kavala and Olympiacos did not show up and they were awarded to AEK.)	3	3	0	0	9	4	+5	100.00	Greek Cup: 1
1966–67	(Greece) (Ottoman Empire)		Tryfon Tzanetis	1965–07–27	1966–12–23	Alpha Ethniki (1)	9	6	1	2	11	6	+5	66.67	Greek Cup: 1
1966–67	(Greece) (Ottoman Empire)		Tryfon Tzanetis	1965–07–27	1966–12–23	European Cup Winners' Cup	2	0	0	2	2	4	-2	00.00	Greek Cup: 1
1966–67	(Greece) (Ottoman Empire)		Tryfon Tzanetis	1965–07–27	1966–12–23	Balkans Cup (1)	3	2	1	0	7	3	+4	66.67	Greek Cup: 1
1966–67	(Greece) (Ottoman Empire)		Tryfon Tzanetis	1965–07–27	1966–12–23	Total	46	30	7	9	87	41	+46	65.22	Greek Cup: 1
1966–67	(Greece) (Ottoman Empire)		Georgios Magiras^{CT}	1966–12–24	1967–01–29	Alpha Ethniki (2)	5	3	2	0	10	7	+3	60.00	—
1966–67	(Hungary)		Jenő Csaknády	1967–02–01	1968–07–24	Alpha Ethniki (3)	16	9	7	0	31	8	+23	56.25	Greek League: 1
1966–67	(Hungary)		Jenő Csaknády	1967–02–01	1968–07–24	Greek Cup	3	2	0	1	10	3	+7	66.67	Greek League: 1
1966–67	(Hungary)		Jenő Csaknády	1967–02–01	1968–07–24	Balkans Cup (2)	6	2	2	2	6	7	-1	33.33	Greek League: 1
1967–68	(Hungary)		Jenő Csaknády	1967–02–01	1968–07–24	Alpha Ethniki	34	22	6	6	68	24	+44	64.71	Greek League: 1
1967–68	(Hungary)		Jenő Csaknády	1967–02–01	1968–07–24	Greek Cup	4	3	0	1	5	3	+2	75.00	Greek League: 1
1967–68	(Hungary)		Jenő Csaknády	1967–02–01	1968–07–24	Balkans Cup (1)	4	1	2	1	6	7	-1	25.00	Greek League: 1
1967–68	(Hungary)		Jenő Csaknády	1967–02–01	1968–07–24	Total	67	39	17	11	126	52	+74	58.21	Greek League: 1
1967–68	(Socialist Federal Republic of Yugoslavia)		Branko Stanković	1968–07–25	1973–02–07	Balkans Cup (2)	2	0	0	2	1	5	-4	00.00	Greek League: 1
1968–69	(Socialist Federal Republic of Yugoslavia)		Branko Stanković	1968–07–25	1973–02–07	Alpha Ethniki	34	17	8	9	58	31	+27	50.00	Greek League: 1
1968–69	(Socialist Federal Republic of Yugoslavia)		Branko Stanković	1968–07–25	1973–02–07	Greek Cup	2	1	0	1	7	4	+3	50.00	Greek League: 1
1968–69	(Socialist Federal Republic of Yugoslavia)		Branko Stanković	1968–07–25	1973–02–07	European Cup	6	2	2	2	9	6	+3	33.33	Greek League: 1
1969–70	(Socialist Federal Republic of Yugoslavia)		Branko Stanković	1968–07–25	1973–02–07	Alpha Ethniki (Note: The home match against Panachaiki is not included since Panachaiki did not show up and it was awarded to AEK.)	33	20	9	4	53	23	+30	60.61	Greek League: 1
1969–70	(Socialist Federal Republic of Yugoslavia)		Branko Stanković	1968–07–25	1973–02–07	Greek Cup^{PEN}	1	0	1	0	1	1	0	00.00	Greek League: 1
1970–71	(Socialist Federal Republic of Yugoslavia)		Branko Stanković	1968–07–25	1973–02–07	Alpha Ethniki	34	23	8	3	67	18	+49	67.65	Greek League: 1
1970–71	(Socialist Federal Republic of Yugoslavia)		Branko Stanković	1968–07–25	1973–02–07	Greek Cup	10	9	0	1	59	7	+52	90.00	Greek League: 1
1970–71	(Socialist Federal Republic of Yugoslavia)		Branko Stanković	1968–07–25	1973–02–07	Inter-Cities Fairs Cup	2	0	0	2	0	4	-4	00.00	Greek League: 1
1971–72	(Socialist Federal Republic of Yugoslavia)		Branko Stanković	1968–07–25	1973–02–07	Alpha Ethniki	34	20	8	6	57	23	+34	58.82	Greek League: 1
1971–72	(Socialist Federal Republic of Yugoslavia)		Branko Stanković	1968–07–25	1973–02–07	Greek Cup^{ET}	3	2	0	1	8	2	+6	66.67	Greek League: 1
1971–72	(Socialist Federal Republic of Yugoslavia)		Branko Stanković	1968–07–25	1973–02–07	European Cup	2	1	0	1	4	6	-2	50.00	Greek League: 1
1972–73	(Socialist Federal Republic of Yugoslavia)		Branko Stanković	1968–07–25	1973–02–07	Alpha Ethniki (1)	18	8	8	2	22	16	+6	44.44	Greek League: 1
1972–73	(Socialist Federal Republic of Yugoslavia)		Branko Stanković	1968–07–25	1973–02–07	Greek Cup	3	2	0	1	12	2	+10	66.67	Greek League: 1
1972–73	(Socialist Federal Republic of Yugoslavia)		Branko Stanković	1968–07–25	1973–02–07	UEFA Cup	4	1	1	2	5	8	-3	25.00	Greek League: 1
1972–73	(Socialist Federal Republic of Yugoslavia)		Branko Stanković	1968–07–25	1973–02–07	Total	188	106	45	37	363	156	+207	56.38	Greek League: 1
1972–73	(Greece)		Kostas Chatzimichail^{CT}	1973–02–08	1973–02–22	Alpha Ethniki (2)	1	0	0	1	0	2	-2	00.00	—
1972–73	(Northern Ireland)		Billy Bingham	1973–02–23	1973–06–30	Alpha Ethniki (3)	15	5	3	7	17	18	-1	33.33	—
1973–74	(England)		Stan Anderson	1973–08–06	1974–04–17	Alpha Ethiki (1)	27	12	6	9	44	31	+13	44.44	—
1973–74	(England)		Stan Anderson	1973–08–06	1974–04–17	Greek Cup^{PEN}	3	1	1	1	4	3	+1	33.33	—
1973–74	(England)		Stan Anderson	1973–08–06	1974–04–17	Total	30	13	7	10	48	34	+14	39.39	—
1973–74	(Greece)		Kostas Chatzimichail^{CT}	1974–04–18	1974–06–30	Alpha Ethniki (2)	7	4	2	1	9	5	+4	57.14	—
1974–75	(Czechoslovakia)		František Fadrhonc	1974–08–02	1977–09–23	Alpha Ethiki	34	23	9	2	73	20	+53	67.65	—
1974–75	(Czechoslovakia)		František Fadrhonc	1974–08–02	1977–09–23	Greek Cup	3	2	0	1	5	1	+4	66.67	—
1975–76	(Czechoslovakia)		František Fadrhonc	1974–08–02	1977–09–23	Alpha Ethiki	30	18	8	4	57	18	+39	60.00	—
1975–76	(Czechoslovakia)		František Fadrhonc	1974–08–02	1977–09–23	Greek Cup	5	4	0	1	18	5	+13	80.00	—
1975–76	(Czechoslovakia)		František Fadrhonc	1974–08–02	1977–09–23	UEFA Cup	4	2	1	1	6	4	+2	50.00	—
1976–77	(Czechoslovakia)		František Fadrhonc	1974–08–02	1977–09–23	Alpha Ethiki	34	24	3	7	63	29	+34	70.59	—
1976–77	(Czechoslovakia)		František Fadrhonc	1974–08–02	1977–09–23	Greek Cup	3	2	0	1	6	4	+2	66.67	—
1976–77	(Czechoslovakia)		František Fadrhonc	1974–08–02	1977–09–23	UEFA Cup^{PEN}	10	5	0	5	15	15	0	50.00	—
1977–78	(Czechoslovakia)		František Fadrhonc	1974–08–02	1977–09–23	Alpha Ethiki (1)	2	1	0	1	6	3	+3	50.00	—
1977–78	(Czechoslovakia)		František Fadrhonc	1974–08–02	1977–09–23	UEFA Cup (1)	1	0	0	1	0	1	-1	00.00	—
1977–78	(Czechoslovakia)		František Fadrhonc	1974–08–02	1977–09–23	Total	126	81	21	24	249	100	+149	64.29	—
1977–78	(Greece)		Andreas Stamatiadis^{CT}	1977–09–24	1977–10–10	Alpha Ethniki (2)	2	2	0	0	7	1	+6	100.00	—
1977–78	(Greece)		Andreas Stamatiadis^{CT}	1977–09–24	1977–10–10	UEFA Cup (2)	1	1	0	0	3	0	+3	100.00	—
1977–78	(Greece)		Andreas Stamatiadis^{CT}	1977–09–24	1977–10–10	Total	3	3	0	0	10	1	+9	100.00	—
1977–78	(Socialist Federal Republic of Yugoslavia)		Zlatko Čajkovski	1977–10–11	1978–06–10	Alpha Ethniki (3)	30	18	11	1	61	22	+39	60.00	Greek League: 1 Greek Cup: 1
1977–78	(Socialist Federal Republic of Yugoslavia)		Zlatko Čajkovski	1977–10–11	1978–06–10	Greek Cup	6	6	0	0	22	4	+18	100.00	Greek League: 1 Greek Cup: 1
1977–78	(Socialist Federal Republic of Yugoslavia)		Zlatko Čajkovski	1977–10–11	1978–06–10	UEFA Cup (3)	2	0	1	1	3	6	-3	00.00	Greek League: 1 Greek Cup: 1
1977–78	(Socialist Federal Republic of Yugoslavia)		Zlatko Čajkovski	1977–10–11	1978–06–10	Total	38	24	12	2	86	32	+54	63.16	Greek League: 1 Greek Cup: 1
1978–79	(Hungary) (Spain)		Ferenc Puskás	1978–06–27	1979–03–17	Alpha Ethniki (1)	23	15	5	3	51	20	+31	65.22	—
1978–79	(Hungary) (Spain)		Ferenc Puskás	1978–06–27	1979–03–17	Greek Cup (1)	4	3	1	0	14	3	+11	75.00	—
1978–79	(Hungary) (Spain)		Ferenc Puskás	1978–06–27	1979–03–17	European Cup	4	1	0	3	9	12	-3	25.00	—
1978–79	(Hungary) (Spain)		Ferenc Puskás	1978–06–27	1979–03–17	Total	31	19	6	6	74	35	+33	61.29	—
1978–79	(Greece)		Andreas Stamatiadis	1979–03–18	1979–06–22	Alpha Ethniki (2) (Note: The play-off match against Olympiacos is not included since Olympiacos did not show up and it was awarded to AEK.)	11	10	1	0	39	9	+30	90.91	Greek League: 1
1978–79	(Greece)		Andreas Stamatiadis	1979–03–18	1979–06–22	Greek Cup (2)	4	2	0	2	10	7	+3	50.00	Greek League: 1
1978–79	(Greece)		Andreas Stamatiadis	1979–03–18	1979–06–22	Total	15	12	1	2	49	16	+33	80.00	Greek League: 1
1979–80	(Austria)		Hermann Stessl	1979–07–01	1980–03–25	Alpha Ethniki (1)	26	13	7	6	50	30	+20	50.00	—
1979–80	(Austria)		Hermann Stessl	1979–07–01	1980–03–25	Greek Cup^{ET}	3	2	0	1	9	5	+4	66.67	—
1979–80	(Austria)		Hermann Stessl	1979–07–01	1980–03–25	European Cup	2	1	0	1	2	3	-1	50.00	—
1979–80	(Austria)		Hermann Stessl	1979–07–01	1980–03–25	Total	31	16	7	11	61	38	+23	51.61	—
1979–80	(Greece)		Miltos Papapostolou^{CM}	1980–03–26	1981–06–18	Alpha Ethniki (2)	8	5	2	1	14	9	+5	62.50	—
1979–80	(Greece)		Miltos Papapostolou^{CM}	1980–03–26	1981–06–18	Alpha Ethniki Play-off	1	0	0	1	0	1	-1	00.00	—
1980–81	(Greece)		Miltos Papapostolou^{CM}	1980–03–26	1981–06–18	Alpha Ethiniki	34	17	10	7	63	42	+21	50.00	—
1980–81	(Greece)		Miltos Papapostolou^{CM}	1980–03–26	1981–06–18	Greek Cup	8	4	1	3	14	10	+4	50.00	—
1980–81	(Greece)		Miltos Papapostolou^{CM}	1980–03–26	1981–06–18	Balkans Cup	4	2	0	2	7	7	0	50.00	—
1980–81	(Greece)		Miltos Papapostolou^{CM}	1980–03–26	1981–06–18	Total	55	28	13	14	98	69	+29	50.91	—
1981–82	(West Germany)		Hans Tilkowski	1981–06–19	1982–01–26	Alpha Ethniki (1)	17	7	6	4	20	15	+5	41.18	—
1981–82	(West Germany)		Hans Tilkowski	1981–06–19	1982–01–26	Greek Cup (1)	1	1	0	0	3	2	+1	100.00	—
1981–82	(West Germany)		Hans Tilkowski	1981–06–19	1982–01–26	Total	18	8	6	4	23	17	+6	44.44	—
1981–82	(Socialist Federal Republic of Yugoslavia)		Zlatko Čajkovski	1982–01–27	1983–01–10	Alpha Ethniki (2)	17	10	5	2	35	20	+15	58.82	—
1981–82	(Socialist Federal Republic of Yugoslavia)		Zlatko Čajkovski	1982–01–27	1983–01–10	Greek Cup (2)	2	0	1	1	3	8	-5	00.00	—
1982–83	(Socialist Federal Republic of Yugoslavia)		Zlatko Čajkovski	1982–01–27	1983–01–10	Alpha Ethniki (1)	13	8	2	3	23	16	+7	61.54	—
1982–83	(Socialist Federal Republic of Yugoslavia)		Zlatko Čajkovski	1982–01–27	1983–01–10	Greek Cup (1)	1	1	0	0	2	1	+1	100.00	—
1982–83	(Socialist Federal Republic of Yugoslavia)		Zlatko Čajkovski	1982–01–27	1983–01–10	UEFA Cup	2	0	0	2	0	6	-6	00.00	—
1982–83	(Socialist Federal Republic of Yugoslavia)		Zlatko Čajkovski	1982–01–27	1983–01–10	Total	35	19	8	8	63	51	+12	54.29	—
1982–83	(Greece)		Kostas Nestoridis^{CT}	1983–01–11	1983–02–13	Alpha Ethniki (2)	5	3	2	0	6	3	+3	60.00	—
1982–83	(Austria)		Helmut Senekowitsch	1983–02–14	1983–07–22	Alpha Ethniki (3)	16	8	3	5	25	20	+5	50.00	Greek Cup: 1
1982–83	(Austria)		Helmut Senekowitsch	1983–02–14	1983–07–22	Greek Cup (2)	8	7	0	1	21	7	+14	87.50	Greek Cup: 1
1982–83	(Austria)		Helmut Senekowitsch	1983–02–14	1983–07–22	Total	24	15	3	6	46	27	+19	46.15	Greek Cup: 1
1983–84	(Republic of Ireland)		John Barnwell	1983–07–23	1983–11–30	Alpha Ethniki (1)	12	5	2	5	18	10	+8	41.67	—
1983–84	(Republic of Ireland)		John Barnwell	1983–07–23	1983–11–30	European Cup Winners' Cup	2	1	0	1	3	4	-1	50.00	—
1983–84	(Republic of Ireland)		John Barnwell	1983–07–23	1983–11–30	Total	14	6	2	6	21	14	+7	42.86	—
1983–84	(Austria)		Helmut Senekowitsch	1983–12–05	1984–02–13	Alpha Ethniki (2)	8	2	3	3	11	11	0	25.00	—
1983–84	(Austria)		Helmut Senekowitsch	1983–12–05	1984–02–13	Greek Cup (1)^{PEN}	3	2	1	0	3	0	+3	66.67	—
1983–84	(Austria)		Helmut Senekowitsch	1983–12–05	1984–02–13	Total	11	4	4	3	14	11	+3	36.36	—
1983–84	(Greece)		Kostas Nestoridis^{CT}	1984–02–14	1984–06–30	Alpha Ethniki (3)	10	5	1	4	11	10	+1	50.00	—
1983–84	(Greece)		Kostas Nestoridis^{CT}	1984–02–14	1984–06–30	Greek Cup (2)	3	1	1	1	3	2	+1	33.33	—
1983–84	(Greece)		Kostas Nestoridis^{CT}	1984–02–14	1984–06–30	Total	13	6	2	5	14	12	+2	46.15	—
1984–85	(Czechoslovakia)		Václav Halama	1984–07–01	1984–12–10	Alpha Ethniki	10	4	5	1	20	11	+9	40.00	—
1984–85	(Czechoslovakia)		Václav Halama	1984–07–01	1984–12–10	Greek Cup	1	0	0	1	0	1	-1	00.00	—
1984–85	(Czechoslovakia)		Václav Halama	1984–07–01	1984–12–10	Total	11	4	5	2	21	12	+8	36.36	—
1984–85	(Greece)		Antonis Georgiadis	1984–12–11	1985–06–19	Alpha Ethniki (2)	20	12	6	2	38	17	+21	60.00	—
1985–86	(Poland)		Jacek Gmoch	1985–06–26	1986–06–12	Alpha Ethniki	30	13	10	7	42	28	+14	43.33	—
1985–86	(Poland)		Jacek Gmoch	1985–06–26	1986–06–12	Greek Cup	9	5	2	2	22	7	+15	55.56	—
1985–86	(Poland)		Jacek Gmoch	1985–06–26	1986–06–12	UEFA Cup	2	1	0	1	1	5	-4	50.00	—
1985–86	(Poland)		Jacek Gmoch	1985–06–26	1986–06–12	Total	41	19	12	10	65	40	+25	46.34	—
1985–86	(Greece)		Nikos Christidis^{CT}	1986–06–12	1986–07–06	Alpha Ethniki Play-off	1	1	0	0	0	0	0	100.00	—
1986–87	(Netherlands)		Ab Fafié	1986–07–07	1986–12–29	Alpha Ethniki (1)	12	4	4	4	14	12	+2	33.33	—
1986–87	(Netherlands)		Ab Fafié	1986–07–07	1986–12–29	Greek Cup^{ET}	2	1	0	1	1	1	+0	50.00	—
1986–87	(Netherlands)		Ab Fafié	1986–07–07	1986–12–29	UEFA Cup	2	0	0	2	0	3	-3	00.00	—
1986–87	(Netherlands)		Ab Fafié	1986–07–07	1986–12–29	Total	16	5	4	7	15	16	-1	31.25	—
1986–87	(Greece)		Nikos Alefantos	1986–12–30	1987–05–07	Alpha Ethniki (2)	14	6	4	4	17	13	+4	42.86	—
1986–87	(Greece)		Nikos Christidis^{CT}	1987–05–08	1987–06–23	Alpha Ethniki (3) (Note: The final matches against Iraklis, Veria and Diagoras are not included since both sides did not show up.)	1	0	0	1	0	1	-1	00.00	—
1987–88	(Socialist Federal Republic of Yugoslavia)		Todor Veselinović	1987–06–24	1988–06–01	Alpha Ethniki	30	15	10	5	51	31	+25	50.00	—
1987–88	(Socialist Federal Republic of Yugoslavia)		Todor Veselinović	1987–06–24	1988–06–01	Greek Cup	5	2	1	2	9	8	+1	40.00	—
1987–88	(Socialist Federal Republic of Yugoslavia)		Todor Veselinović	1987–06–24	1988–06–01	Total	35	17	11	7	60	39	+21	48.57	—
1988–89	(Socialist Federal Republic of Yugoslavia)		Dušan Bajević	1988–06–17	1996–06–03	Alpha Ethniki	30	19	6	5	45	20	+25	63.33	Greek League: 4 Greek Cup: 1 Greek League Cup: 1 Greek Super Cup: 1
1988–89	(Socialist Federal Republic of Yugoslavia)		Dušan Bajević	1988–06–17	1996–06–03	Greek Cup	4	3	0	1	7	4	+3	75.00	Greek League: 4 Greek Cup: 1 Greek League Cup: 1 Greek Super Cup: 1
1988–89	(Socialist Federal Republic of Yugoslavia)		Dušan Bajević	1988–06–17	1996–06–03	UEFA Cup	2	1	0	1	1	2	-1	50.00	Greek League: 4 Greek Cup: 1 Greek League Cup: 1 Greek Super Cup: 1
1989–90	(Socialist Federal Republic of Yugoslavia)		Dušan Bajević	1988–06–17	1996–06–03	Greek Super Cup^{PEN}	1	0	1	0	1	1	0	00.00	Greek League: 4 Greek Cup: 1 Greek League Cup: 1 Greek Super Cup: 1
1989–90	(Socialist Federal Republic of Yugoslavia)		Dušan Bajević	1988–06–17	1996–06–03	Alpha Ethniki	34	20	10	4	64	18	+46	58.82	Greek League: 4 Greek Cup: 1 Greek League Cup: 1 Greek Super Cup: 1
1989–90	(Socialist Federal Republic of Yugoslavia)		Dušan Bajević	1988–06–17	1996–06–03	Greek Cup	6	3	2	1	6	7	-1	50.00	Greek League: 4 Greek Cup: 1 Greek League Cup: 1 Greek Super Cup: 1
1989–90	(Socialist Federal Republic of Yugoslavia)		Dušan Bajević	1988–06–17	1996–06–03	Greek League Cup^{PEN}	5	3	2	0	12	7	+5	60.00	Greek League: 4 Greek Cup: 1 Greek League Cup: 1 Greek Super Cup: 1
1989–90	(Socialist Federal Republic of Yugoslavia)		Dušan Bajević	1988–06–17	1996–06–03	European Cup	4	1	1	2	6	7	-1	25.00	Greek League: 4 Greek Cup: 1 Greek League Cup: 1 Greek Super Cup: 1
1990–91	(Socialist Federal Republic of Yugoslavia)		Dušan Bajević	1988–06–17	1996–06–03	Alpha Ethniki	34	18	6	10	59	33	+26	52.94	Greek League: 4 Greek Cup: 1 Greek League Cup: 1 Greek Super Cup: 1
1990–91	(Socialist Federal Republic of Yugoslavia)		Dušan Bajević	1988–06–17	1996–06–03	Greek Cup	7	6	0	1	18	5	+13	85.71	Greek League: 4 Greek Cup: 1 Greek League Cup: 1 Greek Super Cup: 1
1991–92	(Socialist Federal Republic of Yugoslavia)		Dušan Bajević	1988–06–17	1996–06–03	Alpha Ethniki	34	23	8	3	72	25	+47	67.65	Greek League: 4 Greek Cup: 1 Greek League Cup: 1 Greek Super Cup: 1
1991–92	(Socialist Federal Republic of Yugoslavia)		Dušan Bajević	1988–06–17	1996–06–03	Greek Cup^{ET}	12	7	4	1	21	9	+12	58.33	Greek League: 4 Greek Cup: 1 Greek League Cup: 1 Greek Super Cup: 1
1991–92	(Socialist Federal Republic of Yugoslavia)		Dušan Bajević	1988–06–17	1996–06–03	UEFA Cup	6	3	2	1	7	4	+3	50.00	Greek League: 4 Greek Cup: 1 Greek League Cup: 1 Greek Super Cup: 1
1992–93	(Bosnia and Herzegovina)		Dušan Bajević	1988–06–17	1996–06–03	Greek Super Cup	1	0	0	1	1	3	-2	00.00	Greek League: 4 Greek Cup: 1 Greek League Cup: 1 Greek Super Cup: 1
1992–93	(Bosnia and Herzegovina)		Dušan Bajević	1988–06–17	1996–06–03	Alpha Ethniki	34	24	6	4	78	27	+51	70.59	Greek League: 4 Greek Cup: 1 Greek League Cup: 1 Greek Super Cup: 1
1992–93	(Bosnia and Herzegovina)		Dušan Bajević	1988–06–17	1996–06–03	Greek Cup^{ET}	11	7	2	2	23	10	+13	63.64	Greek League: 4 Greek Cup: 1 Greek League Cup: 1 Greek Super Cup: 1
1992–93	(Bosnia and Herzegovina)		Dušan Bajević	1988–06–17	1996–06–03	UEFA Champions League	4	1	2	1	4	6	-2	25.00	Greek League: 4 Greek Cup: 1 Greek League Cup: 1 Greek Super Cup: 1
1993–94	(Bosnia and Herzegovina)		Dušan Bajević	1988–06–17	1996–06–03	Greek Super Cup	1	0	0	1	0	1	-1	00.00	Greek League: 4 Greek Cup: 1 Greek League Cup: 1 Greek Super Cup: 1
1993–94	(Bosnia and Herzegovina)		Dušan Bajević	1988–06–17	1996–06–03	Alpha Ethniki	34	25	4	5	63	28	+35	73.53	Greek League: 4 Greek Cup: 1 Greek League Cup: 1 Greek Super Cup: 1
1993–94	(Bosnia and Herzegovina)		Dušan Bajević	1988–06–17	1996–06–03	Greek Cup^{PEN}	12	7	5	0	35	11	+24	58.33	Greek League: 4 Greek Cup: 1 Greek League Cup: 1 Greek Super Cup: 1
1993–94	(Bosnia and Herzegovina)		Dušan Bajević	1988–06–17	1996–06–03	UEFA Champions League	2	0	1	1	1	2	-1	00.00	Greek League: 4 Greek Cup: 1 Greek League Cup: 1 Greek Super Cup: 1
1994–95	(Bosnia and Herzegovina)		Dušan Bajević	1988–06–17	1996–06–03	Greek Super Cup	1	0	0	1	0	3	-3	00.00	Greek League: 4 Greek Cup: 1 Greek League Cup: 1 Greek Super Cup: 1
1994–95	(Bosnia and Herzegovina)		Dušan Bajević	1988–06–17	1996–06–03	Alpha Ethniki	34	17	11	6	61	33	+28	50.00	Greek League: 4 Greek Cup: 1 Greek League Cup: 1 Greek Super Cup: 1
1994–95	(Bosnia and Herzegovina)		Dušan Bajević	1988–06–17	1996–06–03	Greek Cup^{ET}	13	12	0	1	27	5	+22	92.31	Greek League: 4 Greek Cup: 1 Greek League Cup: 1 Greek Super Cup: 1
1994–95	(Bosnia and Herzegovina)		Dušan Bajević	1988–06–17	1996–06–03	UEFA Champions League	8	2	2	4	6	9	-3	25.00	Greek League: 4 Greek Cup: 1 Greek League Cup: 1 Greek Super Cup: 1
1995–96	(Bosnia and Herzegovina)		Dušan Bajević	1988–06–17	1996–06–03	Alpha Ethniki	34	25	6	3	87	22	+65	73.53	Greek League: 4 Greek Cup: 1 Greek League Cup: 1 Greek Super Cup: 1
1995–96	(Bosnia and Herzegovina)		Dušan Bajević	1988–06–17	1996–06–03	Greek Cup	13	10	2	1	38	12	+26	76.92	Greek League: 4 Greek Cup: 1 Greek League Cup: 1 Greek Super Cup: 1
1995–96	(Bosnia and Herzegovina)		Dušan Bajević	1988–06–17	1996–06–03	UEFA Cup Winners' Cup	4	1	1	2	5	7	-2	25.00	Greek League: 4 Greek Cup: 1 Greek League Cup: 1 Greek Super Cup: 1
1995–96	(Bosnia and Herzegovina)		Dušan Bajević	1988–06–17	1996–06–03	Total	385	238	84	63	748	321	+427	61.82	Greek League: 4 Greek Cup: 1 Greek League Cup: 1 Greek Super Cup: 1
1996–97	(Greece)		Petros Ravousis	1996–06–04	1997–06–13	Greek Super Cup^{PEN}	1	0	1	0	1	1	0	00.00	Greek Cup: 1 Greek Super Cup: 1
1996–97	(Greece)		Petros Ravousis	1996–06–04	1997–06–13	Alpha Ethniki	34	22	6	6	75	28	+47	64.71	Greek Cup: 1 Greek Super Cup: 1
1996–97	(Greece)		Petros Ravousis	1996–06–04	1997–06–13	Greek Cup^{PEN}	9	7	2	0	22	6	+16	77.78	Greek Cup: 1 Greek Super Cup: 1
1996–97	(Greece)		Petros Ravousis	1996–06–04	1997–06–13	UEFA Cup Winners' Cup	6	4	1	1	9	4	+5	66.67	Greek Cup: 1 Greek Super Cup: 1
1996–97	(Greece)		Petros Ravousis	1996–06–04	1997–06–13	Total	50	33	10	7	107	39	+68	66.00	Greek Cup: 1 Greek Super Cup: 1
1997–98	(Romania)		Dumitru Dumitriu	1997–06–14	1998–04–02	Alpha Ethniki (1)	28	19	6	3	49	23	+26	67.86	—
1997–98	(Romania)		Dumitru Dumitriu	1997–06–14	1998–04–02	UEFA Cup Winners' Cup	6	3	1	2	12	5	+7	50.00	—
1997–98	(Romania)		Dumitru Dumitriu	1997–06–14	1998–04–02	Greek Cup	2	0	0	2	1	4	-3	00.00	—
1997–98	(Romania)		Dumitru Dumitriu	1997–06–14	1998–04–02	Total	36	22	7	7	62	32	+30	61.11	—
1997–98	(Greece)		Antonis Minou^{CT}	1998–04–03	1998–06–02	Alpha Ethniki (2)	6	3	2	1	12	7	+5	50.00	—
1998–99	(Serbia and Montenegro)		Dragoslav Stepanović	1998–06–03	1998–10–30	Alpha Ethniki (1)	7	5	2	0	13	4	+9	71.43	—
1998–99	(Serbia and Montenegro)		Dragoslav Stepanović	1998–06–03	1998–10–30	UEFA Cup	4	1	1	2	9	10	-1	25.00	—
1998–99	(Serbia and Montenegro)		Dragoslav Stepanović	1998–06–03	1998–10–30	Total	11	6	3	2	22	14	+8	54.54	—
1998–99	(Greece)		Takis Karagiozopoulos^{CT}	1998–10–31	1998–11–24	Alpha Ethniki (2)	3	2	0	1	6	4	+2	66.66	—
1998–99	(Greece)		Takis Karagiozopoulos^{CT}	1998–10–31	1998–11–24	Greek Cup	1	0	0	1	0	1	-1	00.00	—
1998–99	(Greece)		Takis Karagiozopoulos^{CT}	1998–10–31	1998–11–24	Total	4	2	0	2	6	5	+1	50.00	—
1998–99	(Ukraine)		Oleg Blokhin	1998–11–25	1999–05–27	Alpha Ethniki (3)	24	16	4	4	52	19	+33	66.67	—
1999–00	(Serbia and Montenegro)		Ljubiša Tumbaković	1999–06–03	2000–01–07	Alpha Ethniki (1)	13	6	3	4	25	18	+7	46.15	—
1999–00	(Serbia and Montenegro)		Ljubiša Tumbaković	1999–06–03	2000–01–07	UEFA Cup	6	3	1	2	11	6	+5	50.00	—
1999–00	(Serbia and Montenegro)		Ljubiša Tumbaković	1999–06–03	2000–01–07	Greek Cup (1)	5	5	0	0	19	3	+16	100.00	—
1999–00	(Serbia and Montenegro)		Ljubiša Tumbaković	1999–06–03	2000–01–07	UEFA Champions League	2	0	1	1	0	1	-1	00.00	—
1999–00	(Serbia and Montenegro)		Ljubiša Tumbaković	1999–06–03	2000–01–07	Total	26	14	5	7	55	28	+27	53.85	—
1999–00	(Greece)		Takis Karagiozopoulos^{CT}	2000–01–08	2000–01–09	Alpha Ethniki (2)	1	0	0	1	2	3	-1	00.00	—
1999–00	(Greece)		Giannis Pathiakakis	2000–01–10	2001–01–24	Alpha Ethniki (3)	20	14	3	3	42	18	+24	70.00	Greek Cup: 1
1999–00	(Greece)		Giannis Pathiakakis	2000–01–10	2001–01–24	Greek Cup (2)	6	4	1	1	18	4	+14	66.67	Greek Cup: 1
2000–01	(Greece)		Giannis Pathiakakis	2000–01–10	2001–01–24	Alpha Ethniki (1)	15	8	3	4	29	22	+7	53.33	Greek Cup: 1
2000–01	(Greece)		Giannis Pathiakakis	2000–01–10	2001–01–24	Greek Cup	12	8	2	2	40	17	+23	66.67	Greek Cup: 1
2000–01	(Greece)		Giannis Pathiakakis	2000–01–10	2001–01–24	UEFA Cup (1)	6	3	2	1	16	8	+8	50.00	Greek Cup: 1
2000–01	(Greece)		Giannis Pathiakakis	2000–01–10	2001–01–24	Total	59	37	11	11	145	69	+76	62.71	Greek Cup: 1
2000–01	(North Macedonia)		Toni Savevski^{CM}	2001–01–25	2001–06–15	Alpha Ethniki (2)	15	11	1	3	32	12	+20	73.33	—
2000–01	(North Macedonia)		Toni Savevski^{CM}	2001–01–25	2001–06–15	UEFA Cup (2)	2	0	0	2	0	6	-6	00.00	—
2000–01	(North Macedonia)		Toni Savevski^{CM}	2001–01–25	2001–06–15	Total	17	11	3	5	32	18	+14	64.71	—
2001–02	(Portugal)		Fernando Santos	2001–06–17	2002–05–09										
2001–02	(Portugal)		Fernando Santos	2001–06–17	2002–05–09	Alpha Ethniki	26	19	1	6	65	28	+37	73.08	Greek Cup: 1
2001–02	(Portugal)		Fernando Santos	2001–06–17	2002–05–09	Greek Cup^{ET}	15	12	3	0	44	9	+35	80.00	Greek Cup: 1
2001–02	(Portugal)		Fernando Santos	2001–06–17	2002–05–09	UEFA Cup^{ET}	10	6	2	2	24	14	+10	60.00	Greek Cup: 1
2001–02	(Portugal)		Fernando Santos	2001–06–17	2002–05–09	Total	51	38	5	8	134	51	+83	74.51	Greek Cup: 1
2002–03	(Bosnia and Herzegovina)		Dušan Bajević	2002–05–19	2004–01–26	Alpha Ethniki	30	21	5	4	74	29	+45	70.00	—
2002–03	(Bosnia and Herzegovina)		Dušan Bajević	2002–05–19	2004–01–26	Greek Cup	10	6	3	1	19	6	+13	60.00	—
2002–03	(Bosnia and Herzegovina)		Dušan Bajević	2002–05–19	2004–01–26	UEFA Champions League	8	2	6	0	11	8	+3	25.00	—
2002–03	(Bosnia and Herzegovina)		Dušan Bajević	2002–05–19	2004–01–26	UEFA Cup	4	2	1	1	8	2	+6	50.00	—
2003–04	(Bosnia and Herzegovina)		Dušan Bajević	2002–05–19	2004–01–26	Alpha Ethniki (1)	18	10	5	3	39	17	+22	55.55	—
2003–04	(Bosnia and Herzegovina)		Dušan Bajević	2002–05–19	2004–01–26	UEFA Champions League	8	1	2	5	4	13	-9	12.50	—
2003–04	(Bosnia and Herzegovina)		Dušan Bajević	2002–05–19	2004–01–26	Greek Cup (1)	4	3	1	0	11	2	+9	75.00	—
2003–04	(Bosnia and Herzegovina)		Dušan Bajević	2002–05–19	2004–01–26	Total	82	45	23	14	166	77	+89	54.88	—
2003–04	(Greece)		Dimitris Bouroutzikas^{CT}	2004–01–29	2004–02–01	Alpha Ethniki (2)	1	0	0	1	1	2	-1	00.00	—
2003–04	(Romania)		Ilie Dumitrescu	2004–02–02	2004–06–30	Alpha Ethniki (3)	11	6	2	3	17	13	+4	54.54	—
2003–04	(Romania)		Ilie Dumitrescu	2004–02–02	2004–06–30	Greek Cup (2)	4	2	1	1	6	5	+1	50.00	—
2003–04	(Romania)		Ilie Dumitrescu	2004–02–02	2004–06–30	Total	15	8	3	4	23	18	+5	53.33	—
2004–05	(Portugal)		Fernando Santos	2004–07–16	2006–05–31	Alpha Ethniki	30	17	11	2	46	22	+24	56.67	—
2004–05	(Portugal)		Fernando Santos	2004–07–16	2006–05–31	Greek Cup^{ET}	10	5	3	2	17	8	+9	50.00	—
2004–05	(Portugal)		Fernando Santos	2004–07–16	2006–05–31	UEFA Cup	6	1	1	4	6	13	-7	16.67	—
2005–06	(Portugal)		Fernando Santos	2004–07–16	2006–05–31	Alpha Ethniki	30	21	4	5	42	20	+22	70.00	—
2005–06	(Portugal)		Fernando Santos	2004–07–16	2006–05–31	Greek Cup^{PEN}	8	3	3	2	10	6	+4	37.50	—
2005–06	(Portugal)		Fernando Santos	2004–07–16	2006–05–31	UEFA Cup	2	0	1	1	0	1	-1	00.00	—
2005–06	(Portugal)		Fernando Santos	2004–07–16	2006–05–31	Total	86	47	23	16	121	70	+51	54.65	—
2006–07	(Spain)		Lorenzo Serra Ferrer	2006–06–07	2008–02–12	Super League Greece	30	18	8	4	60	27	+33	60.00	—
2006–07	(Spain)		Lorenzo Serra Ferrer	2006–06–07	2008–02–12	Greek Cup^{PEN}	1	0	1	0	0	0	0	00.00	—
2006–07	(Spain)		Lorenzo Serra Ferrer	2006–06–07	2008–02–12	UEFA Cup	2	0	0	2	0	4	-4	00.00	—
2006–07	(Spain)		Lorenzo Serra Ferrer	2006–06–07	2008–02–12	UEFA Champions League	8	4	2	2	11	10	+1	50.00	—
2007–08	(Spain)		Lorenzo Serra Ferrer	2006–06–07	2008–02–12	Super League Greece (1)	20	14	0	6	41	13	+28	70.00	—
2007–08	(Spain)		Lorenzo Serra Ferrer	2006–06–07	2008–02–12	UEFA Cup (1)	6	2	2	2	7	5	+2	33.33	—
2007–08	(Spain)		Lorenzo Serra Ferrer	2006–06–07	2008–02–12	Greek Cup	2	1	0	1	2	2	0	50.00	—
2007–08	(Spain)		Lorenzo Serra Ferrer	2006–06–07	2008–02–12	UEFA Champions League	2	0	0	2	1	6	-5	00.00	—
2007–08	(Spain)		Lorenzo Serra Ferrer	2006–06–07	2008–02–12	Total	71	39	13	19	122	67	+55	54.93	—
2007–08	(Greece)		Nikos Kostenoglou^{CM}	2008–02–13	2008–05–14	Super League Greece (2)	10	8	2	0	24	4	+20	80.00	—
2007–08	(Greece)		Nikos Kostenoglou^{CM}	2008–02–13	2008–05–14	UEFA Cup (2)	2	0	1	1	1	4	−3	00.00	—
2007–08	(Greece)		Nikos Kostenoglou^{CM}	2008–02–13	2008–05–14	Super League Greece Play–offs	6	2	2	2	10	11	−1	33.33	—
2007–08	(Greece)		Nikos Kostenoglou^{CM}	2008–02–13	2008–05–14	Total	18	10	5	3	35	19	+16	55.56	—
2008–09	(Greece) (West Germany)		Georgios Donis	2008–05–14	2008–11–17	Super League Greece (1)	10	3	6	1	13	12	+1	30.00	—
2008–09	(Greece) (West Germany)		Georgios Donis	2008–05–14	2008–11–17	UEFA Cup	2	0	1	1	2	3	−1	00.00	—
2008–09	(Greece) (West Germany)		Georgios Donis	2008–05–14	2008–11–17	Greek Cup (1)^{ET}	1	1	0	0	2	1	+1	100.00	—
2008–09	(Greece) (West Germany)		Georgios Donis	2008–05–14	2008–11–17	Total	13	4	7	2	17	16	+1	30.77	—
2008–09	(Bosnia and Herzegovina)		Dušan Bajević	2008–11–21	2010–09–27	Super League Greece (2)	20	11	7	2	27	12	+15	55.00	—
2008–09	(Bosnia and Herzegovina)		Dušan Bajević	2008–11–21	2010–09–27	Greek Cup (2)^{PEN}	6	3	2	1	10	7	+3	50.00	—
2008–09	(Bosnia and Herzegovina)		Dušan Bajević	2008–11–21	2010–09–27	Super League Greece Play–offs	6	3	2	1	8	6	+2	50.00	—
2009–10	(Bosnia and Herzegovina)		Dušan Bajević	2008–11–21	2010–09–27	Super League Greece	30	15	8	7	43	31	+12	50.00	—
2009–10	(Bosnia and Herzegovina)		Dušan Bajević	2008–11–21	2010–09–27	UEFA Europa League	8	2	1	5	9	13	-4	25.00	—
2009–10	(Bosnia and Herzegovina)		Dušan Bajević	2008–11–21	2010–09–27	Super League Greece Play–offs	6	2	2	2	8	7	+1	33.33	—
2009–10	(Bosnia and Herzegovina)		Dušan Bajević	2008–11–21	2010–09–27	Greek Cup^{ET}	1	0	0	1	0	1	-1	00.00	—
2010–11	(Bosnia and Herzegovina)		Dušan Bajević	2008–11–21	2010–09–27	Super League Greece (1)	4	1	1	2	6	7	-1	25.00	—
2010–11	(Bosnia and Herzegovina)		Dušan Bajević	2008–11–21	2010–09–27	UEFA Europa League (1)	3	2	1	0	5	2	+3	66.67	—
2010–11	(Bosnia and Herzegovina)		Dušan Bajević	2008–11–21	2010–09–27	Total	84	39	24	21	116	86	+30	46.43	—
2010–11	(Albania) (Greece)		Bledar Kola^{CT}	2010–09–28	2010–10–07	Super League Greece (2)	1	1	0	0	1	0	+1	100.00	—
2010–11	(Albania) (Greece)		Bledar Kola^{CT}	2010–09–28	2010–10–07	UEFA Europa League (2)	1	0	0	1	2	4	-2	00.00	—
2010–11	(Albania) (Greece)		Bledar Kola^{CT}	2010–09–28	2010–10–07	Total	2	1	0	1	3	4	-1	50.00	—
2010–11	(Spain)		Manolo Jiménez	2010–10–08	2011–10–05	Super League Greece (3)	25	13	4	8	39	30	+9	52.00	Greek Cup: 1
2010–11	(Spain)		Manolo Jiménez	2010–10–08	2011–10–05	UEFA Europa League (3)	4	1	1	2	4	8	−4	25.00	Greek Cup: 1
2010–11	(Spain)		Manolo Jiménez	2010–10–08	2011–10–05	Greek Cup	7	5	1	1	17	4	+13	71.43	Greek Cup: 1
2010–11	(Spain)		Manolo Jiménez	2010–10–08	2011–10–05	Super League Greece Play–offs	6	2	1	3	6	6	0	33.33	Greek Cup: 1
2011–12	(Spain)		Manolo Jiménez	2010–10–08	2011–10–05	Super League Greece (1)	4	3	0	1	6	6	0	75.00	Greek Cup: 1
2011–12	(Spain)		Manolo Jiménez	2010–10–08	2011–10–05	UEFA Europa League (1)^{ET}	4	1	1	2	4	7	−3	25.00	Greek Cup: 1
2011–12	(Spain)		Manolo Jiménez	2010–10–08	2011–10–05	Total	50	25	8	17	76	61	+15	50.00	Greek Cup: 1
2011–12	(Greece)		Nikos Kostenoglou	2011–10–05	2012–06–25	Super League Greece (2)	25	9	9	7	28	23	+5	36.00	—
2011–12	(Greece)		Nikos Kostenoglou	2011–10–05	2012–06–25	Super League Greece Play–offs	6	3	0	3	7	5	+2	50.00	—
2011–12	(Greece)		Nikos Kostenoglou	2011–10–05	2012–06–25	UEFA Europa League (2)	4	1	0	3	6	9	−3	25.00	—
2011–12	(Greece)		Nikos Kostenoglou	2011–10–05	2012–06–25	Greek Cup	2	1	0	1	1	2	−1	50.00	—
2011–12	(Greece)		Nikos Kostenoglou	2011–10–05	2012–06–25	Total	37	14	9	14	42	39	+3	37.84	—
2012–13	(Greece)		Vangelis Vlachos	2012–06–26	2012–09–30	Super League Greece (1)	5	0	1	4	2	6	-4	00.00	—
2012–13	(Greece)		Manolis Papadopoulos^{CT}	2012–10–01	2012–10–09	Super League Greece (2)	1	0	1	0	1	1	0	00.00	—
2012–13	(Germany)		Ewald Lienen	2012–10–10	2013–04–09	Super League Greece (3)	22	8	4	10	18	25	−7	36.36	—
2012–13	(Germany)		Ewald Lienen	2012–10–10	2013–04–09	Greek Cup	2	0	1	1	0	1	−1	00.00	—
2012–13	(Germany)		Ewald Lienen	2012–10–10	2013–04–09	Total	24	8	5	11	18	26	–8	33.33	—
2012–13	(Greece)		Traianos Dellas^{CM}	2013–04–09	2015–10–20	Super League Greece (4)	2	0	0	2	0	4	-4	00.00	Football League 2 (6th Group): 1 Football League (South Group): 1
2013–14	(Greece)		Traianos Dellas^{CM}	2013–04–09	2015–10–20	Football League 2	28	24	3	1	80	14	+66	85.71	Football League 2 (6th Group): 1 Football League (South Group): 1
2013–14	(Greece)		Traianos Dellas^{CM}	2013–04–09	2015–10–20	Football League 2 Cup	4	3	0	1	9	2	+7	75.00	Football League 2 (6th Group): 1 Football League (South Group): 1
2014–15	(Greece)		Traianos Dellas^{CM}	2013–04–09	2015–10–20	Football League	22	20	2	0	61	10	+51	90.91	Football League 2 (6th Group): 1 Football League (South Group): 1
2014–15	(Greece)		Traianos Dellas^{CM}	2013–04–09	2015–10–20	Promotion Play-offs	10	5	3	2	14	9	+5	50.00	Football League 2 (6th Group): 1 Football League (South Group): 1
2014–15	(Greece)		Traianos Dellas^{CM}	2013–04–09	2015–10–20	Greek Cup	9	5	3	1	15	3	+12	55.56	Football League 2 (6th Group): 1 Football League (South Group): 1
2015–16	(Greece)		Traianos Dellas^{CM}	2013–04–09	2015–10–20	Super League Greece (1)	7	4	1	2	10	8	+2	57.14	Football League 2 (6th Group): 1 Football League (South Group): 1
2015–16	(Greece)		Traianos Dellas^{CM}	2013–04–09	2015–10–20	Total	82	61	12	9	189	50	+139	74.39	Football League 2 (6th Group): 1 Football League (South Group): 1
2015–16	(Greece)		Stelios Manolas^{CT}	2015–10–21	2015–10–28	Super League Greece (2)	1	1	0	0	5	1	+4	100.00	—
2015–16	(Greece)		Stelios Manolas^{CT}	2015–10–21	2015–10–28	Greek Cup (1)	1	1	0	0	1	0	+1	100.00	—
2015–16	(Greece)		Stelios Manolas^{CT}	2015–10–21	2015–10–28	Total	2	2	0	0	6	1	+5	100.00	—
2015–16	(Uruguay) (Spain)		Gus Poyet	2015–10–29	2016–04–19	Super League Greece (3)	22	12	5	5	28	12	+16	54.55	—
2015–16	(Uruguay) (Spain)		Gus Poyet	2015–10–29	2016–04–19	Greek Cup (2)	6	6	0	0	19	1	+18	100.00	—
2015–16	(Uruguay) (Spain)		Gus Poyet	2015–10–29	2016–04–19	Total	28	18	5	5	47	13	+34	64.29	—
2015–16	(Greece)		Stelios Manolas^{CT}	2016–04–20	2016–06–05	Greek Cup (3)	3	2	1	0	4	2	+2	66.67	Greek Cup: 1
2015–16	(Greece)		Stelios Manolas^{CT}	2016–04–20	2016–06–05	Super League Greece Play-offs	6	2	1	3	5	7	-2	33.33	Greek Cup: 1
2015–16	(Greece)		Stelios Manolas^{CT}	2016–04–20	2016–06–05	Total	9	4	2	3	9	9	0	44.44	Greek Cup: 1
2016–17	(Georgia (country))		Temur Ketsbaia	2016–06–06	2016–10–18	Super League Greece (1)	5	3	1	1	8	5	+3	60.00	—
2016–17	(Georgia (country))		Temur Ketsbaia	2016–06–06	2016–10–18	UEFA Europa League	2	0	1	1	0	1	-1	00.00	—
2016–17	(Georgia (country))		Temur Ketsbaia	2016–06–06	2016–10–18	Total	7	3	2	2	8	6	2	42.86	—
2016–17	(Portugal) (Angola)		José Morais	2016–10–18	2017–01–18	Super League Greece (2)	11	2	6	3	15	11	+4	18.18	—
2016–17	(Portugal) (Angola)		José Morais	2016–10–18	2017–01–18	Greek Cup (1)	3	1	2	0	6	2	+4	33.33	—
2016–17	(Portugal) (Angola)		José Morais	2016–10–18	2017–01–18	Total	14	3	8	3	21	13	+8	21.43	—
2016–17	(Spain)		Manolo Jiménez	2017–01–19	2018–05–25	Super League Greece (3)	14	9	4	1	31	7	+24	64.29	Super League: 1
2016–17	(Spain)		Manolo Jiménez	2017–01–19	2018–05–25	Super League Greece Play-offs	6	4	0	2	5	3	+2	66.67	Super League: 1
2016–17	(Spain)		Manolo Jiménez	2017–01–19	2018–05–25	Greek Cup (2)	7	4	1	2	13	4	+9	57.14	Super League: 1
2017–18	(Spain)		Manolo Jiménez	2017–01–19	2018–05–25	UEFA Champions League	2	0	0	2	0	3	-3	00.00	Super League: 1
2017–18	(Spain)		Manolo Jiménez	2017–01–19	2018–05–25	Super League Greece	30	21	7	2	50	12	+38	70.00	Super League: 1
2017–18	(Spain)		Manolo Jiménez	2017–01–19	2018–05–25	Greek Cup	10	7	1	2	21	7	+16	70.00	Super League: 1
2017–18	(Spain)		Manolo Jiménez	2017–01–19	2018–05–25	UEFA Europa League	10	2	8	0	10	6	+4	20.00	Super League: 1
2017–18	(Spain)		Manolo Jiménez	2017–01–19	2018–05–25	Total	79	47	21	11	130	42	+88	57.69	Super League: 1
2018–19	(Greece)		Marinos Ouzounidis	2018–05–25	2019–02–05	Super League Greece (1)	19	12	4	3	33	8	+25	63.16	—
2018–19	(Greece)		Marinos Ouzounidis	2018–05–25	2019–02–05	Greek Cup (1)	5	4	1	0	15	3	+12	80.00	—
2018–19	(Greece)		Marinos Ouzounidis	2018–05–25	2019–02–05	UEFA Champions League	10	2	2	6	8	17	-9	20.00	—
2018–19	(Greece)		Marinos Ouzounidis	2018–05–25	2019–02–05	Total	34	18	7	9	56	28	+28	52.94	—
2018–19	(Spain)		Manolo Jiménez	2019–02–06	2019–05–27	Super League Greece (2)	11	6	2	3	17	11	+6	54.55	—
2018–19	(Spain)		Manolo Jiménez	2019–02–06	2019–05–27	Greek Cup (2)	5	4	0	1	10	1	+9	80.00	—
2018–19	(Spain)		Manolo Jiménez	2019–02–06	2019–05–27	Total	16	10	2	4	27	12	+15	62.50	—
2019–20	(Portugal)		Miguel Cardoso	2019–05–28	2019–08–26	UEFA Europa League (1)	3	1	1	1	4	4	0	33.33	—
2019–20	(Portugal)		Miguel Cardoso	2019–05–28	2019–08–26	Super League Greece (1)	1	0	0	1	1	2	-1	00.00	—
2019–20	(Portugal)		Miguel Cardoso	2019–05–28	2019–08–26	Total	4	1	1	2	5	6	-1	25.00	—
2019–20	(Greece)		Nikos Kostenoglou^{CM}	2019–09–03	2019–12–08	UEFA Europa League (2)	1	1	0	0	2	0	+2	100.00	—
2019–20	(Greece)		Nikos Kostenoglou^{CM}	2019–09–03	2019–12–08	Super League Greece (2)	12	6	3	3	22	15	+7	50.00	—
2019–20	(Greece)		Nikos Kostenoglou^{CM}	2019–09–03	2019–12–08	Total	13	7	3	3	24	15	+9	53.85	—
2019–20	(Italy)		Massimo Carrera	2019–12–08	2020–12–22	Super League Greece (3)	13	9	3	1	19	5	+14	69.23	—
2019–20	(Italy)		Massimo Carrera	2019–12–08	2020–12–22	Super League Greece Play-offs	10	5	3	2	17	10	+7	50.00	—
2019–20	(Italy)		Massimo Carrera	2019–12–08	2020–12–22	Greek Cup^{ET}	7	3	3	1	12	6	+6	60.00	—
2020–21	(Italy)		Massimo Carrera	2019–12–08	2020–12–22	UEFA Europa League	8	3	0	5	10	16	-6	37.50	—
2020–21	(Italy)		Massimo Carrera	2019–12–08	2020–12–22	Super League Greece (1)	12	7	3	2	23	13	+10	58.33	—
2020–21	(Italy)		Massimo Carrera	2019–12–08	2020–12–22	Total	50	27	12	11	81	40	+31	54.00	—
2020–21	(Spain)		Manolo Jiménez	2020–12–27	2021–05–26	Super League Greece (2)	14	7	3	4	18	16	+2	50.00	—
2020–21	(Spain)		Manolo Jiménez	2020–12–27	2021–05–26	Greek Cup	6	2	0	4	8	8	0	33.33	—
2020–21	(Spain)		Manolo Jiménez	2020–12–27	2021–05–26	Super League Greece Play-offs	10	3	3	4	12	16	-6	30.00	—
2020–21	(Spain)		Manolo Jiménez	2020–12–27	2021–05–26	Total	30	12	6	12	38	40	-2	40.00	—
2021–22	(Serbia) (Greece)		Vladan Milojević	2021–05–27	2021–10–08	UEFA Europa Conference League^{PEN}	2	1	0	1	2	2	0	50.00	—
2021–22	(Serbia) (Greece)		Vladan Milojević	2021–05–27	2021–10–08	Super League Greece (1)	5	3	1	1	10	6	+4	60.00	—
2021–22	(Serbia) (Greece)		Vladan Milojević	2021–05–27	2021–10–08	Total	7	4	1	3	12	8	+4	57.14	—
2021–22	(Germany) (Greece)		Argirios Giannikis	2021–10–10	2022–03–01	Super League Greece (2)	19	10	2	7	29	20	+9	52.63	—
2021–22	(Germany) (Greece)		Argirios Giannikis	2021–10–10	2022–03–01	Greek Cup	4	1	2	1	6	3	+3	25.00	—
2021–22	(Germany) (Greece)		Argirios Giannikis	2021–10–10	2022–03–01	Total	23	11	4	8	35	23	+12	47.82	—
2021–22	(Greece)		Sokratis Ofrydopoulos^{CT}	2022–03–02	2022–05–19	Super League Greece (3)	2	1	1	0	3	2	+1	50.00	—
2021–22	(Greece)		Sokratis Ofrydopoulos^{CT}	2022–03–02	2022–05–19	Super League Greece Play-offs	10	2	4	4	14	14	0	20.00	—
2021–22	(Greece)		Sokratis Ofrydopoulos^{CT}	2022–03–02	2022–05–19	Total	12	3	5	4	17	16	+1	25.00	—
2022–23	(Argentina) (Italy)		Matías Almeyda	2022–05–20	2025–05–13	Super League Greece	26	19	2	5	51	14	+37	73.08	Super League: 1 Greek Cup: 1
2022–23	(Argentina) (Italy)		Matías Almeyda	2022–05–20	2025–05–13	Greek Cup	8	7	0	1	19	3	+16	87.50	Super League: 1 Greek Cup: 1
2022–23	(Argentina) (Italy)		Matías Almeyda	2022–05–20	2025–05–13	Super League Greece Play-offs	10	7	3	0	18	3	+15	70.00	Super League: 1 Greek Cup: 1
2023–24	(Argentina) (Italy)		Matías Almeyda	2022–05–20	2025–05–13	UEFA Champions League	4	1	1	2	5	6	-1	25.00	Super League: 1 Greek Cup: 1
2023–24	(Argentina) (Italy)		Matías Almeyda	2022–05–20	2025–05–13	Super League Greece	26	17	8	1	60	25	+35	65.38	Super League: 1 Greek Cup: 1
2023–24	(Argentina) (Italy)		Matías Almeyda	2022–05–20	2025–05–13	Greek Cup^{PEN}	2	0	2	0	1	1	0	00.00	Super League: 1 Greek Cup: 1
2023–24	(Argentina) (Italy)		Matías Almeyda	2022–05–20	2025–05–13	UEFA Europa League	6	1	1	4	6	12	-6	16.67	Super League: 1 Greek Cup: 1
2023–24	(Argentina) (Italy)		Matías Almeyda	2022–05–20	2025–05–13	Super League Greece Play-offs	10	6	1	3	20	8	+12	52.08	Super League: 1 Greek Cup: 1
2024–25	(Argentina) (Italy)		Matías Almeyda	2022–05–20	2025–05–13	UEFA Conference League	4	3	0	1	10	6	+4	75.00	Super League: 1 Greek Cup: 1
2024–25	(Argentina) (Italy)		Matías Almeyda	2022–05–20	2025–05–13	Super League Greece	26	16	5	5	44	16	+28	61.54	Super League: 1 Greek Cup: 1
2024–25	(Argentina) (Italy)		Matías Almeyda	2022–05–20	2025–05–13	Greek Cup	6	3	2	1	6	8	-2	50.00	Super League: 1 Greek Cup: 1
2024–25	(Argentina) (Italy)		Matías Almeyda	2022–05–20	2025–05–13	Super League Greece Play-offs	6	0	0	6	4	12	-8	00.00	Super League: 1 Greek Cup: 1
2024–25	(Argentina) (Italy)		Matías Almeyda	2022–05–20	2025–05–13	Total	134	80	25	29	244	114	+130	59.70	Super League: 1 Greek Cup: 1
2025–26	(Serbia)		Marko Nikolić	2025–06–14		UEFA Conference League	16	9	4	3	30	18	+12	56.25	Super League: 1
2025–26	(Serbia)		Marko Nikolić	2025–06–14		Super League Greece	26	18	6	2	49	17	+32	69.23	Super League: 1
2025–26	(Serbia)		Marko Nikolić	2025–06–14		Greek Cup	5	4	0	1	6	2	+4	80.00	Super League: 1
2025–26	(Serbia)		Marko Nikolić	2025–06–14		Super League Greece Play-offs	6	3	3	0	8	3	+5	50.00	Super League: 1
2026–27	(Serbia)		Marko Nikolić	2025–06–14		Greek Super Cup^{PEN}	1	0	1	0	2	2	0	00.00	Super League: 1
2026–27	(Serbia)		Marko Nikolić	2025–06–14		UEFA Champions League	2	1	1	0	4	0	+4	50.00	Super League: 1
2026–27	(Serbia)		Marko Nikolić	2025–06–14		Super League Greece	2	1	1	0	5	1	+4	50.00	Super League: 1
2026–27	(Serbia)		Marko Nikolić	2025–06–14		Total	58	36	15	6	104	43	+61	62.07	Super League: 1

Last updated: 2026-08-30
Source: worldfootball.net

^{CT}Served only as caretaker manager.

^{CM}Served as caretaker manager before being appointed permanently.

^{ET}Extra time taken into account.

^{PEN}Extra time taken into account and went to penalty shoot-out.

Only competitive matches are counted. Wins, losses and draws are results at the final whistle.

== Manager Records ==
=== Honours by manager ===
#	Name	Years	League	AFCA	Cup	Super Cup	League Cup	Total
1	(Bosnia and Herzegovina) Dušan Bajević	1988–1996; 2002–2004; 2008–2010	4	0	1	1	1	7
2	(Greece) Kostas Negrepontis	1933–1936; 1937–1948; 1955–1957; 1958–1959	2	3	2	0	0	7
3	(England) Jack Beby	1948–1951	0	2	1	0	0	3
4	(Hungary) Jenő Csaknády	1962–1963; 1967–1968	2	0	0	0	0	2
5	(Socialist Federal Republic of Yugoslavia) Zlatko Čajkovski	1977–1978; 1982–1983	1	0	1	0	0	2
6	(Spain) Manolo Jiménez	2010–2011; 2017–2018; 2019; 2020–2021	1	0	1	0	0	2
7	(Argentina) Matías Almeyda	2022–2025	1	0	1	0	0	2
8	(Greece) Petros Ravousis	1996–1997	0	0	1	1	0	2
9	(Socialist Federal Republic of Yugoslavia) Branko Stanković	1968–1973	1	0	0	0	0	1
10	(Greece) Andreas Stamatiadis	1977; 1979	1	0	0	0	0	1
11	(Serbia) Marko Nikolić	2025–	1	0	0	0	0	1
12	(Hungary) Emil Rauchmaul	1931–1932	0	0	1	0	0	1
13	(Greece) Tryfon Tzanetis	1951; 1957–1958; 1961–1962; 1965–1966	0	0	1	0	0	1
14	(Austria) Heinrich Müller	1963–1964	0	0	1	0	0	1
15	(Austria) Helmut Senekowitsch	1983; 1983–1984	0	0	1	0	0	1
16	(Greece) Giannis Pathiakakis	2000–2001	0	0	1	0	0	1
17	(Portugal) Fernando Santos	2001–2002; 2004–2006	0	0	1	0	0	1
18	(Greece) Stelios Manolas	2016	0	0	1	0	0	1

=== Matches ===
Competitive, official competitions only. Wins, appear in parentheses.

#	Name	Years	Domestic					Continental					Total				
#	Name	Years	League	Cup	AFCA	Super Cup	League Cup	UCL	ICFC / UEL	CWC	UECL	Balkans Cup	Total				
#	Name	Years	1	(Bosnia and Herzegovina) Dušan Bajević	1988–1996; 2002–2004; 2008–2010	382 (234)	99 (67)	0 (0)	4 (0)	5 (3)	34 (7)	23 (10)	Total	4 (1)	0 (0)	0 (0)	551 (322)
2	(Greece) Kostas Negrepontis	1933–1936; 1937–1948; 1955–1957; 1958–1959	82 (38)	21 (15)	128 (82)	0 (0)	0 (0)	0 (0)	0 (0)	0 (0)	0 (0)	0 (0)	231 (135)				
3	(Socialist Federal Republic of Yugoslavia) Branko Stanković	1968–1973	153 (88)	19 (14)	0 (0)	0 (0)	0 (0)	8 (3)	6 (1)	0 (0)	0 (0)	2 (0)	188 (106)				
4	(Spain) Manolo Jiménez	2010–2011; 2017–2018; 2019; 2020–2021	120 (68)	35 (22)	0 (0)	0 (0)	0 (0)	2 (0)	18 (4)	0 (0)	0 (0)	0 (0)	175 (94)				
5	(Greece) Tryfon Tzanetis	1951; 1957–1958; 1961–1962; 1965–1966	108 (66)	24 (20)	14 (10)	0 (0)	0 (0)	0 (0)	0 (0)	2 (0)	0 (0)	7 (3)	155 (99)				
6	(Portugal) Fernando Santos	2001–2002; 2004–2006	86 (57)	33 (20)	0 (0)	0 (0)	0 (0)	0 (0)	18 (7)	0 (0)	0 (0)	0 (0)	137 (84)				
7	(Argentina) Matías Almeyda	2022–2025	104 (65)	16 (10)	0 (0)	0 (0)	0 (0)	4 (1)	6 (1)	0 (0)	4 (3)	0 (0)	134 (80)				
8	(Czechoslovakia) František Fadrhonc	1974–1977	100 (66)	11 (8)	0 (0)	0 (0)	0 (0)	0 (0)	15 (7)	0 (0)	0 (0)	0 (0)	126 (81)				
9	(Hungary) Jenő Csaknády	1962–1963; 1967–1968	81 (51)	10 (7)	0 (0)	0 (0)	0 (0)	0 (0)	0 (0)	0 (0)	0 (0)	10 (3)	101 (61)				
10	(Socialist Federal Republic of Yugoslavia) Zlatko Čajkovski	1977–1978; 1982–1983	60 (36)	9 (7)	0 (0)	0 (0)	0 (0)	0 (0)	4 (0)	0 (0)	0 (0)	0 (0)	73 (43)				
