= Olympiacos F.C. honours =

Olympiacos F.C. are the most successful football club in Greece with eighty-two (82) major domestic trophies. Actually, they have won a record forty-eight League (48) titles, more than half of the total titles, a record twenty-nine (29) Greek Cups and a record five (5) Greek Super Cups.

For the honours of the Youth Sector, see Olympiacos F.C. Youth Academy Honours.

== National titles (82) (record) ==
=== Greek Championships (48) (record) ===
- Super League Greece (1960–present, including Alpha Ethniki 1960–2006)

Winners (33) (record): 1965–66, 1966–67, 1972–73, 1973–74, 1974–75, 1979–80, 1980–81, 1981–82, 1982–83, 1986–87, 1996–97, 1997–98, 1998–99, 1999–2000, 2000–01, 2001–02, 2002–03, 2004–05, 2005–06, 2006–07, 2007–08, 2008–09, 2010–11, 2011–12, 2012–13, 2013–14, 2014–15, 2015–16, 2016–17, 2019–20, 2020–21, 2021–22, 2024–25

- Panhellenic Championship (1928–1959)

Winners (15) (record): 1930–31, 1932–33, 1933–34, 1935–36, 1936–37, 1937–38, 1946–47, 1947–48, 1950–51, 1953–54, 1954–55, 1955–56, 1956–57, 1957–58, 1958–59

=== National Cups (34) (record) ===
- Greek Cup

Winners (29) (record): 1946–47, 1950–51, 1951–52, 1952–53, 1953–54, 1956–57, 1957–58, 1958–59, 1959–60, 1960–61, 1962–63, 1964–65, 1967–68, 1970–71, 1972–73, 1974–75, 1980–81, 1989–90, 1991–92, 1998–99, 2004–05, 2005–06, 2007–08, 2008–09, 2011–12, 2012–13, 2014–15, 2019–20, 2024–25

- Greek Super Cup

Winners (5) (record): 1980, 1987, 1992, 2007, 2025

== Continental titles (2) ==
- UEFA Conference League

Winners (1): 2023–24

=== Youth Team ===
- UEFA Youth League

Winners (1): 2023–24

== Others International titles ==
- Balkans Cup

Winners (1): 1962–63

== Regional titles ==
- Piraeus Regional Championship

Winners (25) (record): 1925, 1926, 1927, 1929 (along with Ethnikos Piraeus), 1930, 1931, 1934, 1935, 1937, 1938, 1940, 1946, 1947, 1948, 1949, 1950, 1951, 1952, 1953, 1954, 1955, 1956, 1957, 1958, 1959
Runners-up (1): 1939

- Southern Greece Championship

Winners (2): 1933, 1934

== Unofficial titles ==
- International Easter Cup

Winners (11) (record): 1928, 1929, 1934, 1936, 1943, 1945, 1946, 1949, 1951, 1953, 1959

- International Christmas Cup

Winners (11) (record): 1943, 1948, 1951, 1952, 1953, 1954, 1956, 1959, 1960, 1961, 1962

- Greater Greece Cup

Winners (3) (record): 1969, 1972, 1976
