= 1947 Greek Football Cup final =

1947 Greek Cup final
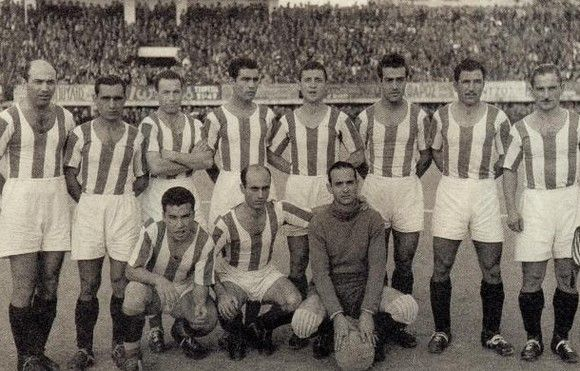
- Olympiacos' squad in the final
- Event: 1946–47 Greek Football Cup
Olympiacos	Iraklis
5	0
- Date: 8 June 1947
- Venue: Leoforos Alexandras Stadium, Ampelokipoi, Athens
- Referee: Sotiris Asprogerakas (Athens)
- Attendance: 12,000

The 1947 Greek Cup final was the 5th final of the Greek Cup. The match took place on 8 June 1947 at Leoforos Alexandras Stadium. The contesting teams were Olympiacos and Iraklis. It was Olympiacos' first ever Greek Cup final in their 22 years of existence and Iraklis' first ever Greek Cup final in their 39-year history. It was the first Cup final to be held after the end of World War II. Olympiacos won by a record 5-goal difference, also achieving their first ever domestic double.

== Venue ==
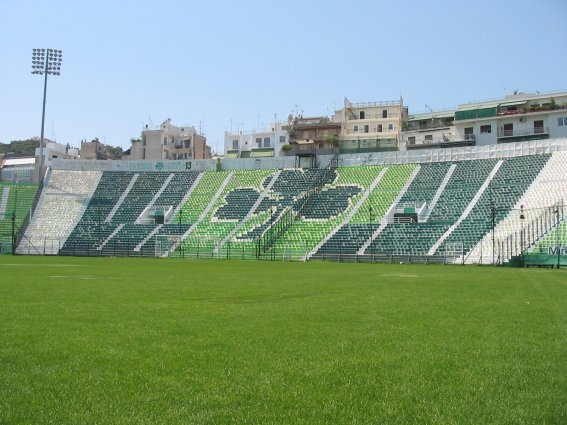
Leoforos Alexandras Stadium.

This was the fourth Greek Cup final held at Leoforos Alexandras Stadium, after the 1932, 1939 and 1940 finals. (Leoforos also hosted the replay match of the 1933 final between Ethnikos Piraeus and Aris).

Leoforos Alexandras Stadium was built in 1922. The stadium is used as a venue for Panathinaikos and Greece. Its current capacity is 30,000.

== Background ==
Olympiacos had never competed in a Cup final.

Iraklis had never competed in a Cup final.

The two teams had never met each other in a Cup final.

== Route to the final ==
Olympiacos				Round	Iraklis			
Opponent	Agg.	1st leg	2nd leg		Opponent	Agg.	1st leg	2nd leg
Bye				Sixth round	Marathon Kiouri	10–1 (H)		
Bye				Seventh round	Megas Alexandros Thessaloniki	2–0 (H)		
Bye				Eighth round	Bye			
Panathinaikos	2–0	0–0 (H)	2–0 (w/o) (A)	Round of 16	Elpida Drama	6–2 (A)		
Ethnikos Piraeus	2–0 (H)			Quarter-finals	Aris	2–0 (H)		
Achilleas Patra	4–1 (H)			Semi-finals	Niki Volos	3–0 (H)		

== Match ==
=== Details ===
8 June 1947
17:30 EET

Olympiacos	5–0	Iraklis
Vazos 13', 31', 78'; Vasiliadis 17'; Chatzistavridis 79'	Report

Leoforos Alexandras Stadium, Athens
Attendance: 12,000
Referee: Sotiris Asprogerakas (Athens)

GK	(Greece) Stelios Kourouklatos
DF	(Greece) Nikos Zakkas
DF	(Greece) Andreas Mouratis
MF	(Greece) Dionysis Minardos
MF	(Greece) Giannis Chelmis
MF	(Greece) Giorgos Vagiakos
FW	(Greece) Angelos Vasiliadis
FW	(Greece) Alekos Chatzistavridis
FW	(Greece) Giannis Vazos (c)
FW	(Greece) Giorgos Piliouris
FW	(Greece) Mimis Apostolopoulos
Manager:
(Greece) Themos Asderis

GK	(Greece) Charchalis
DF	(Greece) Tsaganias
DF	(Greece) Paraschos
MF	(Greece) Tsaldaris
MF	(Greece) Sidiropoulos
MF	(Greece) Nikolaou
FW	(Greece) Papadakis
FW	(Greece) Kakkos
FW	(Greece) Frenelis
FW	(Greece) Kalogiannis
FW	(Greece) Margaropoulos
Manager:

Match rules

- 90 minutes
- 30 minutes of extra time if necessary
- Replay match if scores still level

== See also ==
- 1946–47 Greek Football Cup
