= 1931–32 Panhellenic Championship =

4th season of top-tier football league in Greece

Panhellenic Championship
- Season: 1931–32
- Champions: Aris; 2nd Greek title
- Relegated: PAOK
- Matches: 49
- Goals: 180 (3.67 per match)
- Top goalscorer: Nikos Kitsos (15 goals)
- Biggest home win: Aris 7–0 Panathinaikos
- Biggest away win: AEK Athens 0–4 Olympiacos
- Highest scoring: Aris 7–3 Iraklis
- Longest unbeaten run: Aris

The 1931–32 Panhellenic Championship was the fourth season of the highest football league of Greece. Aris won their 2nd championship. AEK Athens, Olympiacos and PAOK qualified for the relegation play-offs for the Athenian, Piraeus' and Macedonian Association, respectively. AEK and Olympiacos prevailed in the play-off matches and remained in the national division. PAOK did not take part in the play-off matches against Megas Alexandros, which were scheduled for 18 and 22 September 1932, protesting against the decision of the HFF, which was issued on July 22, 1932, while PAOK had ended his league games, canceling his 3–2 win over Iraklis on 5 June 1932, following the objection of Iraklis against the referee that kept only 1 minute of stoppage time for to the club's supporters storming the pitch and the police intervention to restore order. The match was scheduled to be repeated at the neutral AEK Stadium in Athens on September 11. PAOK did not appear in the match and Iraklis was declared the winner without a match by the decision of the HFF, overtaking PAOK in the standings. PAOK was then appointed by the HFF to give double qualifying matches with the then champion of Macedonia Megas Alexandros, however it did not show up again in either of the two matches, as a result of which it lost both games without a match. Thus, PAOK were relegated to the regional championship of Macedonia for the first time in its history.

It was held as a national division, in which 8 teams from the 3 founding Associations of the HFF, participated and resulted as follows:

- Athenian Championship: The first 3 teams of the 1930–31 ranking.
- Piraeus' Championship: The first 2 teams of the 1930–31 ranking.
- Macedonian Championship: The first 3 teams of the 1930–31 ranking.

These teams did not participate in the regional championships and their stay in the national division was judged by a play-off round. According to the regulations of the time, whoever finished in a lower position than the other teams of the same Association had to play a two-legged round against the winner of the corresponding regional championship to decide who will qualify for the 1932–33 Panhellenic Championship.

The point system was: Win: 2 points - Draw: 1 point - Loss: 0 points.

== League table ==
Pos	Team	Pld	W	D	L	GF	GA	GD	Pts	Qualification or relegation
1	Aris (C)	14	9	4	1	38	10	+28	22	1932–33 Panhellenic Championship
2	Panathinaikos	14	8	2	4	24	22	+2	18	1932–33 Panhellenic Championship
3	Apollon Athens	14	7	2	5	21	19	+2	16	1932–33 Panhellenic Championship
4	Ethnikos Piraeus	14	4	4	6	19	17	+2	12	1932–33 Panhellenic Championship
5	Iraklis	14	5	2	7	25	32	−7	12	1932–33 Panhellenic Championship
6	Olympiacos	14	5	2	7	22	20	+2	12	Relegation play-offs
7	PAOK (R)	14	5	1	8	18	25	−7	11	Relegation play-offs
8	AEK Athens	14	4	1	9	13	35	−22	9	Relegation play-offs

Source: rsssf
(C) Champions; (R) Relegated

== Results ==
Home \ Away	ARIS	PAO	APOL	ETH	OLY	IRA	PAOK	AEK
Aris		7–0	6–1	2–1	2–1	7–3	2–0	2–1
Panathinaikos	0–0		1–2	2–1	2–1	7–1	2–1	3–1
Apollon Athens	1–1	3–0		0–1	3–1	3–1	3–1	2–1
Ethnikos Piraeus	1–1	0–1	0–0		1–0	1–1	2–0	6–0
Olympiacos	0–3	1–1	2–1	2–2		0–2	2–3	4–0
Iraklis	0–0	1–3	3–0	3–2	0–2		2–5	5–0
PAOK	0–3	3–1	1–0	2–0	0–2	0–2 (Note: The initial 3–2 on June 5 was canceled after an objection by Iraklis and was set to be repeated on September 11 at a neutral ground. PAOK did not show up for the match. Awarded 2–0 to Iraklis.)		2–2
AEK Athens	0–3	0–1	0–2	3–1	0–4	2–1	2–0	

Source: rsssf
Legend: Blue = home team win; Yellow = draw; Red = away team win.

=== Relegation play-offs ===
Team 1	Agg.	Team 2	1st leg	2nd leg
Olympiacos	8–1	Amyna Piraeus	6–1	2–0
PAOK	0–4	Megas Alexandros	0–2^{[a]}	0–2^{[a]}
AEK Athens	5–3	Goudi Athens	2–2	3–1

a. PAOK refused to participate to the relegation play-offs as a protest to the decision of HFF to cancel the 3–2 win over Iraklis that would have PAOK qualified directly to the next season's championship. As a result, PAOK did not show up for any of the matches and both were awarded 2–0 to Megas Alexandros.

== Top scorers ==
Rank	Player	Club	Goals
1	(Greece) Nikos Kitsos	Aris	15
2	(Greece) Nikolaos Angelakis	Aris	14
3	(Greece) Iordanis Papaiordanidis	PAOK	10
4	(Greece) Nikos Bourletidis	Ethnikos Piraeus	9
4	(Greece) Prokopiou	Apollon Athens	9
6	(Greece) Takis Triantafyllis	Panathinaikos	8
6	(Greece) Vasilios Andrianopoulos	Olympiacos	8
8	(Greece) Giannis Vazos	Olympiacos	6
8	(Greece) Giorgos Kavourmatzidis	PAOK	6
8	(Greece) Odysseas Charistou	Iraklis	6
