= Giannis Vazos =

Greek footballer

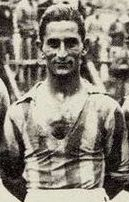

Personal information
- Full name: Ioannis Vazos
- Date of birth: 1914
- Place of birth: Smyrna, Ottoman Empire
- Date of death: 6 November 1991 (aged 76–77)
- Place of death: Piraeus, Greece
- Position: Forward

Youth career
- 1929-1931: Apollon Drapetsonas

Senior career*
Years	Team	Apps	(Gls)
1931	AEK Piraeus		
1931-1949	Olympiacos	148	(170)
Total		148	(170)

International career
1932–1948	Greece	14	(3)
- * Club domestic league appearances and goals

Giannis Vazos (Greek: Γιάννης Βάζος; 1914 – 6 November 1991) was a Greek international football player who played as a forward.

== Early life ==
He was born into a relatively wealthy family due to his father, Zacharias, being a trader and ran a Butcher shop. However, during pregnancy, his mother, Stella, contracted an illness that endangered the life of both her and young Giannis. During his birth, Giannis developed a Neurological disorder in his legs. This led to the slight, but obvious peculiarity whenever Giannis would run, with the fans believing that his “stronger” right foot was shorter than his left. Giannis was the middle of 7 siblings. The older ones being Evangelia, Georgia and Vasilis and the younger ones being Stélio, Christos, Katina.

During the events of the Greco-Turkish War, the Vazos family left on a chartered boat and then quickly settled permanently in Drapetsona. From the age of 11, Giannis worked in Zacharías’ new Butcher shop and at this time he came in first contact with football.

== Club career ==
=== Apollon Drapetsonas ===
He started playing football when he dropped out of school at 11 and worked for the family business. “His friends wanted him to join a team, but Giannis was still young - only 13 years old - and his father did not like football." Despite his father’s wishes, for Giannis to carry on the family business, he joined the unofficial Apollo team, with his teammates later known as Roussos, Vouvoudakis and Hatzisavvas . He quickly established himself in the position of right winger, the right in the then 2–3–5 formation. In an attempt to locate his repeatedly incompetent son, Zacharias found Giannis on a football pitch, for the first time.

=== AEK Piraeus ===
Some sources state that in 1931 he played for AEK Piraeus. It is possible that he took part in friendly matches of the neighbouring AEK during this period, since his transfer to Olympiacos was agreed during the halftime of a match.

=== Olympiacos ===
In the spring of 1931, he immediately accepted the proposal for joining Olympiacos, from the consultant and talent scout George Alekaki (their old defender ) who "was impressed by his dynamism, his intelligence, his stubbornness and his cunningness". He started training with the second team, but because his contract at Apollon was still in force, he did not acquire the right to participate in official matches until the new season. The following year, 1932–33, he was both the natural successor to the position of the main striker, with George Andrianopoulos having retired since the summer of 1931, as well as the formal, when the legendary Podara himself had already been awarded the relevant "title" after his excellent first appearance with the first team. This had taken place since 20 September 1931, in the maiden meeting of Olympiacos for the Greek Cup, a 4–1 victory over Atromitos (still on Acharnon Street), with Vazos scoring 3 goals, despite him being used as a midfielder. Very soon he was re-selected for the friendlies of the PAO stadium against Apollon Athens (3–3, he scored 2) and the Wacker (0–2), where he was now assigned the role of center forward. It has been said that before the first match, the 17-year-old asked for and received the "vote of confidence" of his teammates, in order to "lead the eleven" from this crucial position, according to an expression of the time.

In the same period 1931-32 (for two consecutive and three in total), the experiment of the pre-war 1931–32 was also applied, with Olympiacos having secured its participation due to its presence in the previous Panhellenic championship (conquest) and not participating in the low-capacity Piraeus, which was offered for the promotion of players from the second team. The consequence was that Vazos did not receive opportunities in the new organisation, which developed disappointingly for the club by being limited to 5th place out of 8 in the standings of the 1931–32. Only by relegation with Kokkinias to avoid relegation to the 1st local category of Piraeus EPS. The end of the season also brought the career of Vasilios Andrianopoulos and Dinos Andrianopoulos to an end, so in combination with the departure of George a year ago, the three brothers were replaced respectively by the Christoforos Raggos and Theologos Symeonidis.

These players, of completely different qualifications and game, quickly formed an attacking trio with a maximum contribution to winning 5 Panhellenic Championshipsin the next 6 years and participated in 1933 in two matches of the National team for the Balkan Cup of Bucharest. Contrary to what is believed afterwards, the "legendary triplet" that made Olympiacos popular in Greece, is Rangos-Vazos-Symeonidis and not the previous Vassilis-Giorgos-Dinos. Possible causes, the spread of football interest throughout the country and their repeated coronation as national champions (even Athens - Piraeus - Thessaloniki only) in the new EPO event, while a common point of reference of the two trios is, of course, their supply from the striker and younger Andrianopoulos, Leonidas Andrianopoulos.

Vazos played with Olympiacos for 18 years and retired at the age of 35. His presence, however, was not uninterrupted, with at least once after the Liberation deciding to leave permanently and return due to lack of an equal replacement. He was absent during the first post-war season 1945-46, before returning for the next three (probably on an unstable basis) and re-emerging as the top scorer in the Greek league (4th time), winning two additional titles and his only Greek Cup (with hat trick in the final), and was anointed for the 14th and last time international in 1948, again after 12 years. On 26 June 1949, and the 3–2 away defeat by Panathinaikos for the championship, he made - without scoring a goal - the final appearance of his football career at an official level. He participated in 11 of the 13 final and / or qualifying phases of the Panhellenic championship or National category that the red and whites played during his days, with the exception of the virgin period 1931-32 in the club and the first post-war 1945-46. In 7 cases he contributed to the occupation of the top (1933, 1934, 1936, 1937, 1938, 1947, 1948), in 8 of the respective Piraeus championships and in 1947 to the first conquest of the Greek Cup by Olympiacos. Vazos himself became a top scorer 4 times in the Greek championship (1933, 1936 with three more, 1937, 1947), one second (1938) and 2 times first of the southern group (1934, 1939 with Kleanthis Maropoulos).

According to Christos Arvanitis, a collector of football statistics, Vazos scored 450 goals in 364 games. Vazos is second in the all-time leading top scorers for Olympiacos, only behind Giorgos Sideris, who has 493 goals in 519 games.

The data from Christos is as follows. 91 goals in 62 Piraeus FCA Championship games. 34 goals in 41 games in the qualifiers of the Panhellenic championship and 45 goals in 45 games in the final phase of the Panhellenic championship. 9 goals in 8 games in the Greek Cup, including a hat-trick in a 5–0 win against Iraklis, in the final of the 1946–47. In unofficial games, Giannis scored 12 goals in 11 unofficial cup games. 202 goals in 163 games against Greek teams. 56 goals in 34 international friendly games. Vazos also scored 1 goal in a cancelled championship match.

== International career ==
Vazos played 14 games and scored 3 goals for Greece.

== Personal life ==
In the second half of 1933 he married Rodi, also from Asia Minor, after meeting for a few months and despite the paternal disagreement about the young man of their age. At 19 he became a father to Stella, while about a decade later Jordan followed. In the meantime he had enlisted in the period 1937 to 1939 in the First Army Regiment, where he organised a strong football team with the support of Lieutenant Colonel Agisilaos Sinioris. During the declaration of the Greco-Italian War he was presented in Volos, he was promoted to Tomori and under his orders he took part in operations of the Manoeuvre Brigade. Due to the lack of food, with the beginning of the Occupation, he turned the butcher shop into a liquor store, but he was soon arrested because some prohibited items were trafficked there. He denied his previous acquaintance with the perpetrators, but the Military Court at 8 Sina Street sentenced him to death, a sentence that was hardly reduced to 5 years in prison. From July 1941 he remained imprisoned for a year and 12 days, for a long time in the Tatoi labour camp, was given to him thanks to the celebration of the occupying forces for some of their success on the war front. His house, on the other hand, had been almost completely destroyed by the German bombing of the port of Piraeus on 7 April 1941, and the family of Giannis Vazos was hosted in their paternal home, until the purchase of a new one in Kokkinia (today Nikaia). He resided in it for a long period of his later life. He died on 6 November 1991 in Piraeus.

== Honours ==
Olympiacos

- Panhellenic Championship: 1932–33, 1933–34, 1935–36, 1936–37, 1937–38, 1946–47, 1947–48
- Greek Cup: 1946–47
- Piraeus FCA Championship: 1934, 1937, 1938, 1946, 1947, 1948, 1949.

Individual

- Panhellenic championship top scorer: 1932–33, 1935–36, 1936–37, 1946–47.
- Piraeus FCA Championship top scorer: 1934 (10 goals), 1939 (18 goals).
