= 1937–38 Panhellenic Championship =

9th season of top-tier football league in Greece

Panhellenic Championship
- Season: 1937–38
- Champions: Olympiacos; 6th Greek title
- Relegated: none
- Matches: 6
- Goals: 27 (4.5 per match)
- Top goalscorer: Theologos Simeonidis (5 goals)
- Biggest home win: Olympiacos 5–1 Aris; Apollon Athens 4–0 Aris
- Biggest away win: Apollon Athens 1–3 Olympiacos
- Highest scoring: Olympiacos 5–1 Aris
- Longest winning run: Olympiacos (4 matches)
- Longest unbeaten run: Olympiacos (4 matches)
- Longest winless run: Aris (4 matches)
- Longest losing run: Aris (4 matches)

The 1937–38 Panhellenic Championship was the ninth season of the highest football league of Greece. The champions of the 3 founding Associations of the HFF participated in the championship, which were the Αthenian, the Piraeus' and the Macedonian association. Olympiacos emerged again undefeated champion and won the championship for their sixth time (3 consecutive), winning in the crucial last game the then champion of Athens, Apollon Athens with 2-3 after a comeback from 2-1 at the half time, at Leoforos Alexandras Stadium. The point system was: Win: 2 points - Draw: 1 point - Loss: 0 points.

== Qualification round ==
=== Athens Football Clubs Association ===
Pos	Team	Pld	GF	GA	GD	Pts	Qualification
1	Apollon Athens (Q)	10	32	11	+21	17	Final Round
2	AEK Athens	10	33	12	+21	16	
3	Panathinaikos	10	44	10	+34	13	
4	Asteras Athens	10	19	27	-8	7	
5	Daphni Metaxourgeio	10	11	35	-24	6	
6	Athinaikos	10	9	53	-44	1	

=== Piraeus Football Clubs Association ===
Pos	Team	Pld	GF	GA	GD	Pts	Qualification
1	Olympiacos (Q)	6	33	2	+31	12	Final Round
2	Ethnikos Piraeus	6	12	13	-1	5	
3	Thiseas Piraeus	6	10	25	-15	4	
4	Aris Piraeus	6	7	22	-15	3	

=== Macedonia Football Clubs Association ===
Pos	Team	Pld	GF	GA	GD	Pts	Qualification
1	Aris (Q)	12	40	8	+32	20	Final Round
2	PAOK	12	31	19	+12	17	
3	Iraklis	12	30	15	+15	17	
4	Makedonikos	12	17	22	-5	12	
5	MENT	12	13	13	0	11	
6	Aetos Papafi	12	12	28	-10	5	
7	Olympiacos Terpsithea	12	9	49	-40	2	

== Final round ==
=== League table ===
Pos	Team	Pld	W	D	L	GF	GA	GD	Pts	OLY	APOL	ARIS
1	Olympiacos (C)	4	4	0	0	14	6	+8	8		3–2	5–1
2	Apollon Athens	4	2	0	2	9	7	+2	4	1–3		4–0
3	Aris	4	0	0	4	4	14	−10	0	2–3	1–2	

Source: rsssf
(C) Champions

== Top scorers ==
Rank	Player	Club	Goals
1	(Greece) Theologos Simeonidis	Olympiacos	5
2	(Greece) Giannis Vazos	Olympiacos	4
3	(Greece) Christoforos Rangos	Olympiacos	3
3	(Greece) Stratos	Apollon Athens	3
