= 1933–34 Panhellenic Championship =

6th season of top-tier football league in Greece

Panhellenic Championship
- Season: 1933–34
- Champions: Olympiacos; 3rd Greek title
- Relegated: none
- Matches: 2
- Goals: 8 (4 per match)
- Top goalscorer: Theologos Simeonidis (3 goals)
- Biggest home win: Olympiacos 2–1 Iraklis
- Biggest away win: Iraklis 2–3 Olympiacos
- Highest scoring: Iraklis 2–3 Olympiacos
- Longest winning run: Olympiacos (2 matches)
- Longest unbeaten run: Olympiacos (2 matches)
- Longest winless run: Iraklis (2 matches)
- Longest losing run: Iraklis (2 matches)

The 1933–34 Panhellenic Championship was the sixth season of the highest football league of Greece. It was held in two groups, the South and the North.

The South Group was formed by 6 teams which resulted as follows:

- Athenian Championship: The first 4 teams of the ranking.
- Piraeus' Championship: The first 2 teams of the ranking.

The North Group was formed by 4 teams which resulted as follows:

- Macedonian Championship: The first 4 teams of the ranking.

The winners of the 2 groups competed in a two-legged final. The national category, in which the clubs that did not qualify, competed in the regional championships, was abolished. So the clubs played first in the regional championships and then in the national category. Essentially, this arrangement was made to favor Panathinaikos, which had initially been relegated the previous year, after it had refused to participate in the ranking matches. The decision for the abolition of the National category was taken by the General Assembly of the HFF, which was held on September 23-24, 1933. Thus, PAOK returned to the first division, after a year of absence from the top division and staying in the Macedonian championship, due to demotion. The point system was: Win: 2 points - Draw: 1 point - Loss: 0 points.

== Qualification round ==
=== Athens Football Clubs Association ===
Pos	Team	Pld	W	D	L	GF	GA	GD	Pts	Qualification	PAO	APOL	AEK	ATT	GDI	ATR
1	Panathinaikos (Q)	10	8	2	0	34	11	+23	18	South Group		4–0	2–1	3–3	6–1	3–0
2	Apollon Athens (Q)	10	6	2	2	19	9	+10	14	South Group	1–2		1–1	2–0	1–0	5–1
3	AEK Athens (Q)	10	3	4	3	14	15	−1	10	South Group	2–5	0–2		1–1	2–1	1–1
4	Attikos (Note: Attikos was punished by the Athens' Federation for a formal offense and was excluded from participating in the Panhellenic championship. Goudi took his place.)	10	3	2	5	13	19	−6	8		2–4	0–4	0–2		1–0	2–0
5	Goudi Athens (Q)	10	2	3	5	10	16	−6	7	South Group	0–0	1–1	2–2	2–0		1–3
6	Atromitos (Note: Atromitos didn't show up in the last 3 games of the championship with Apollon Athens, AEK Athens and Goudi and lost them all by 0-2.)	10	1	1	8	7	27	−20	3		1–5	0–2 (Note: Atromitos didn't show up in his last 3 games and lost them 0–2 without a match.)	0–2	1–4	0–2	

Source: rsssf
(Q) Qualified for the phase indicated

==== Top scorers ====
Rank	Player	Club	Goals
1	(Greece) Dimitris Baltasis	Panathinaikos	7
1	(Greece) Panagiotis Sourmelis	Panathinaikos	7
3	(Greece) Antonis Migiakis	Panathinaikos	4
3	(Greece) Kostas Christodoulou	Panathinaikos	4
5	(Greece) Takis Triantafyllis	Panathinaikos	3
5	(Greece) P. Dimitriou	Apollon Athens	3
5	(Greece) Sotiris Tziralidis	AEK Athens	3
8	(Greece) Ilias Kritikos	AEK Athens	2
8	(Greece) Marios Voutsadopoulos	Panathinaikos	2
8	(Greece) Apostolou	Goudi Athens	2
8	(Greece) K. Deligiannis	Apollon Athens	2
8	(Greece) Deligiannidis	Apollon Athens	2
8	(Greece) Chatzisavvas	Apollon Athens	2
8	(Greece) Lampropoulos	Atromitos	2
8	(Greece) Katsachnias	Attikos	2
8	(Greece) Orfanos	Attikos	2
8	(Greece) Sarigiannis	Attikos	2

=== Piraeus Football Clubs Association ===
Pos	Team	Pld	W	D	L	GF	GA	GR	Pts	Qualification	OLY	ETH	AMY	ARG	FAL
1	Olympiacos (Note: The match between Olympiacos and Argonaftis was canceled, because it did not affect the final ranking, since Olympiacos had a better goal ratio than Ethnikos Piraeus.) (Q)	7	6	1	0	28	4	7.000	13	South Group		0–0	2–0	10–2	6–0
2	Ethnikos Piraeus (Q)	8	6	1	1	22	5	4.400	13	South Group	0–4		4–0	5–1	5–1
3	Amyna Kokkinia	8	3	1	4	20	15	1.333	7		2–4	0–2		4–0	7–1
4	Argonaftis Piraeus	7	1	2	4	11	26	0.423	4		— (Note: Suspended)	0–4	1–1		6–1
5	Falirikos Syndesmos	8	0	1	7	4	35	0.114	1		0–2	0–2 (Note: Awarded 2–0 (w/o) to Ethnikos Piraeus.)	1–6	1–1	

Source: rsssf
(Q) Qualified for the phase indicated

==== Top scorers ====
Rank	Player	Club	Goals
1	(Greece) Giannis Vazos	Olympiacos	7
2	(Greece) Koulis Tsiritakis	Ethnikos Piraeus	6
3	(Greece) F. Negrepontis	Amyna Kokkinia	5
3	(Greece) Theologos Simeonidis	Olympiacos	5
5	(Greece) Vangelis Chelmis	Ethnikos Piraeus	3
6	(Greece) Alexopoulos	Ethnikos Piraeus	2
6	(Greece) Fotiadis	Amyna Kokkinia	2
6	(Greece) Chatziantoniou	Argonaftis Piraeus	2
6	(Greece) Panagiotis Korsianos	Olympiacos	2
10	(Greece) Nikos Grigoratos	Olympiacos	1
10	(Greece) Leonidas Andrianopoulos	Olympiacos	1
10	(Greece) Deligiorgis	Ethnikos Piraeus	1
10	(Greece) Spyros Lapatas	Ethnikos Piraeus	1
10	(Greece) Fragakis	Ethnikos Piraeus	1
10	(Greece) Palyzoidis	Amyna Kokkinia	1
10	(Greece) Sgouros	Amyna Kokkinia	1
10	(Greece) Foutris	Amyna Kokkinia	1

=== Macedonia Football Clubs Association ===
Pos	Team	Pld	W	D	L	GF	GA	GD	Pts	Qualification	ARIS	PAOK	MEG	IRA	MAK	MEL	THER
1	Aris (Q)	6	6	0	0	29	3	+26	12	North Group		1–0	4–0	3–0	7–1	6–1	8–1
2	PAOK (Q)	6	5	0	1	21	6	+15	10	North Group	—		6–1	2–0	3–2	5–1	5–1
3	Megas Alexandros (Q)	6	4	0	2	15	15	0	8	North Group	—	—		3–1	3–1	4–3	4–0
4	Iraklis (Q)	6	3	0	3	18	10	+8	6	North Group	—	—	–		4–1	7–0	6–1
5	Makedonikos	6	1	0	5	10	22	−12	2		—	—	—	—		4–2	—
6	Meliteus	6	1	0	5	8	26	−18	2		—	—	—	—	—		1–0
7	Thermaikos	6	1	0	5	6	25	−19	2		—	—	—	—	3–1	—	

Source: Athletic Echo
(Q) Qualified for the phase indicated

==== Top scorers ====
Rank	Player	Club	Goals
1	(Greece) Aristidis Ioannidis	PAOK	5
2	(Greece) Lefteris Margaropoulos	Megas Alexandros	4
2	(Greece) Odysseas Charistou	Iraklis	4
5	(Greece) Nikolaos Angelakis	Aris	3
5	(France) Raymond Étienne	PAOK	3
5	(Greece) Giorgos Kavourmatzis	PAOK	3
5	(Greece) Dimitris Kollias	Iraklis	3
5	(Greece) Spyros Chatzitsiros	Iraklis	3
9	(Greece) Argyris Argyriadis	Aris	2
9	(Greece) Kostas Kalogiannis	Aris	2
9	(Greece) Zakapidas	Megas Alexandros	2

== Semi-final round ==
=== South Group ===
Pos	Team	Pld	W	D	L	GF	GA	GD	Pts	Qualification	OLY	PAO	ETH	APOL	GDI	AEK
1	Olympiacos (Q)	10	7	1	2	27	8	+19	15	Finals		1–2	1–1	2–0	7–1	4–0
2	Panathinaikos	10	7	0	3	32	14	+18	14		0–1		6–1	7–1	1–4	5–0
3	Ethnikos Piraeus	10	5	2	3	20	20	0	12		3–2	2–3		2–0	3–1	3–2
4	Apollon Athens	10	5	0	5	17	19	−2	10		1–3	1–3	3–1		3–0	4–1
5	Goudi Athens	10	2	2	6	14	28	−14	6		1–3	2–1	2–2	0–3		3–3
6	AEK Athens	10	1	1	8	9	30	−21	3		0–3	1–4	0–2	0–1	2–1	

Source: rsssf
(Q) Qualified for the phase indicated

==== Top scorers ====
Rank	Player	Club	Goals
1	(Greece) Giannis Vazos	Olympiacos	10
2	(Greece) Theologos Simeonidis	Olympiacos	9
3	(Greece) Dimitris Sofianopoulos	Panathinaikos	8
4	(Greece) Dimitris Baltasis	Panathinaikos	7
4	(Greece) Lapatas	Ethnikos Piraeus	7
6	(Greece) Prokopiou	Apollon Athens	6
6	(Greece) Takis Triantafyllis	Panathinaikos	6
6	(Greece) Kostas Christodoulou	Panathinaikos	6
9	(Greece) Alekos Sidiropoulos	Goudi Athens	5
10	(Greece) Kostas Negris	Goudi Athens	6
10	(Greece) Pananos	Apollon Athens	6
10	(Greece) Christoforos Rangos	Olympiacos	6
10	(Greece) Koulis Tsiritakis	Ethnikos Piraeus	6
10	(Greece) Vangelis Chelmis	Ethnikos Piraeus	6

=== North Group ===
Pos	Team	Pld	W	D	L	GF	GA	GD	Pts	Qualification	IRA	ARIS	PAOK	MEG
1	Iraklis (Q)	6	4	2	0	15	6	+9	10	Finals		2–1	0–0	6–3
2	Aris	6	3	1	2	26	14	+12	7		1–2		5–3	7–2
3	PAOK	6	2	3	1	19	10	+9	7		1–1	3–3		6–0
4	Megas Alexandros	6	0	0	6	8	38	−30	0		0–4	2–9	0–6	

Source: RSSSF
(Q) Qualified for the phase indicated

==== Top scorers ====
Rank	Player	Club	Goals
1	(Greece) Nikos Kitsos	Aris	10
2	(Greece) Aristidis Ioannidis	PAOK	6
3	(Greece) Dimitris Kollias	Iraklis	5
4	(Greece) Zacharias Eftathiadis	Iraklis	4
4	(France) Raymond Étienne	PAOK	4
4	(Greece) Kostas Kalogiannis	Iraklis	4
7	(Greece) Odysseas Askepidis	Iraklis	3
7	(Greece) Lefteris Margaropoulos	Megas Alexandros	3
9	(Greece) Giorgos Kavourmatzis	PAOK	2
9	(Greece) Georgios Papadopoulos	PAOK	2

== Finals ==
Summary
Team 1	Agg.	Team 2	1st leg	2nd leg
Iraklis	3–5	Olympiacos	2–3	1–2

=== Matches ===
10 June 1934

Iraklis	2–3	Olympiacos
Chatzitsiros 20'; Efstathiadis 44'	Report	Simeonidis 57', 80'; Grigoratos 73'

Iraklis Stadium, Thessaloniki
17 June 1934

Olympiacos	2–1	Iraklis
Rangos 24'; Simeonidis 72'	Report	Charistou 89'

Velodrome, Piraeus

Olympiacos won 5–3 on aggregate.

== Top scorers ==
Rank	Player	Club	Goals
1	(Greece) Theologos Simeonidis	Olympiacos	3
2	(Greece) Nikos Grigoratos	Olympiacos	1
2	(Greece) Christoforos Rangos	Olympiacos	1
2	(Greece) Spyros Chatzitsiros	Iraklis	1
2	(Greece) Zacharias Efstathiadis	Iraklis	1
2	(Greece) Odysseas Charistou	Iraklis	1
