= 1936–37 Panhellenic Championship =

8th season of top-tier football league in Greece

Panhellenic Championship
- Season: 1936–37
- Champions: Olympiacos; 5th Greek title
- Relegated: none
- Matches: 6
- Goals: 15 (2.5 per match)
- Top goalscorer: Giannis Vazos (4 goals)
- Biggest home win: Olympiacos 2–0 PAOK; Panathinaikos 2–0 PAOK
- Biggest away win: PAOK 1–5 Olympiacos
- Highest scoring: PAOK 1–5 Olympiacos
- Longest winning run: Olympiacos (4 matches)
- Longest unbeaten run: Olympiacos (4 matches)

The 1936–37 Panhellenic Championship was the eighth season of the highest football league of Greece. The champions of the 3 founding Associations of the HFF participated in the championship, which were the Αthenian, the Piraeus' and the Macedonian association. Olympiacos won the championship, for the fifth time in its history and for the first time undefeated. The point system was: Win: 2 points - Draw: 1 point - Loss: 0 points.

== Qualification round ==
=== Athens Football Clubs Association ===
Pos	Team	Pld	GF	GA	GD	Pts	Qualification
1	Panathinaikos (Q)	10	40	8	+32	17	Final Round
2	AEK Athens	10	33	12	+21	16	
3	Apollon Athens	10	31	11	+21	14	
4	Asteras Athens	10	13	23	-10	8	
5	Dafni Metaxourgeio	10	11	37	-26	5	
6	Goudi Athens	10	0	40	-40	0	

=== Piraeus Football Clubs Association ===
Pos	Team	Pld	W	D	L	GF	GA	GD	Pts	Qualification
1	Olympiacos (Q)	6	5	1	0	20	6	+14	11	Final Round
2	Ethnikos Piraeus	6	4	1	1	23	6	+17	9	
3	Aris Piraeus	6	1	1	4	4	13	−9	3	
4	Thiseas Piraeus	6	0	1	5	2	24	−22	1	

Source: rsssf
(Q) Qualified for the phase indicated

=== Macedonia Football Clubs Association ===
Pos	Team	Pld	GF	GA	GD	Pts	Qualification
1	PAOK (Q)	8	19	11	+8	12	Final Round
2	Iraklis	8	22	9	+13	11	
3	Aris	8	22	12	+10	9	
4	MENT	8	12	22	-10	6	
5	Prosfygiki Enosis	8	6	27	-21	0	

== Final round ==
=== League table ===
Pos	Team	Pld	W	D	L	GF	GA	GD	Pts	OLY	PAOK	PAO
1	Olympiacos (C)	4	4	0	0	10	1	+9	8		2–0	2–0 (Note: Panathinaikos did not show up for the match. Awarded 2–0 to Olympiacos.)
2	PAOK	4	1	0	3	3	9	−6	2	1–5		2–0 (Note: Panathinaikos did not show up for the match. Awarded 2–0 to PAOK.)
3	Panathinaikos	4	1	0	3	2	5	−3	2	0–1	2–0	

Source: rsssf
(C) Champions

== Top scorers ==
Rank	Player	Club	Goals
1	(Greece) Giannis Vazos	Olympiacos	4
2	(Greece) Theologos Simeonidis	Olympiacos	2
