= 1946–47 Panhellenic Championship =

13th season of top-tier football league in Greece

Panhellenic Championship
- Season: 1946–47
- Champions: Olympiacos; 7th Greek title
- Relegated: none
- Matches: 30
- Goals: 107 (3.57 per match)
- Top goalscorer: Giannis Vazos (12 goals)
- Biggest home win: Panionios 5–0 Atromitos Piraeus
- Biggest away win: Panionios 0–4 Olympiacos; Makedonikos 4–8 Panionios
- Highest scoring: Makedonikos 4–8 Panionios
- Longest winless run: Makedonikos (10 matches)
- Longest losing run: Makedonikos (10 matches)

The 1946–47 Panhellenic Championship was the 13th season of the highest football league of Greece.

The form of the final round was decided after intense consultations and it was decided the teams that participated increased by 3 (6 out of 3) and resulted as follows:

- Athenian Championship: The first 2 teams of the ranking.
- Piraeus' Championship: The first 2 teams of the ranking.
- Macedonian Championship: The first 2 teams of the ranking.

The championship was won by Olympiacos after a hard battle with Iraklis and Panionios. As the championship advanced, Iraklis had the first say, being the leader of the standings and undefeated. During the home game of Iraklis, on 26-6-1947 against AEK Athens, the referee Diamantopoulos left, interrupting the game in the 60th minute, with the score at that point at 0-2, because the football player of Iraklis, Paraschos Paschalidis refused to leave the field, although he had been expelled for kicking the referee, while at the same time there were episodes that started on the occasion of some fights between football players, but evolved as invasion of spectators on the field.

On 29-6-1947, the Iraklis-Olympiakos match was held with a final result of 2-1, a fact that connected the emergence of the champion with the fate of the interrupted match, since Iraklis with this match completed its competitive obligations, while Olympiakos remaining 9 points had 3 games less. In the meantime, the HFF decided at first instance with 3-2 votes to zero Iraklis, as the culprit of the suspension in the match, with AEK being awarded the game. Following an appeal by Iraklis, who claimed that the reason for the suspension was the fans who invaded the stadium and who wore insignia of AEK, the secondary judicial committee of the HFF zeroed both teams as accomplices of the suspension, considering the reason for this the quarrel of the goalkeeper of AEK, Delavinias, with the forward of Iraklis, Zakapidas.For the first time, Iraklis came very close to winning the title, but Olympiakos won the remaining 3 games and reached 25 points, passing marginally first and crowned champion. The point system was: Win: 3 points - Draw: 2 points - Loss: 1 point.

== Qualification round ==
=== Athens Football Clubs Association ===
| Pos | Team | Pld | W | D | L | GF | GA | GR | Pts | Qualification |
|---|---|---|---|---|---|---|---|---|---|---|
| 1 | AEK Athens (Q) | 14 | 10 | 1 | 3 | 29 | 12 | 2.417 | 35 (Note: AEK won the title due to a better goal ratio. In the final matchday, AEK were defeated by Panathinaikos by 0–2 while Panionios won against Enosi Pagrati by 9–1. Panionios could have won the championship if they did not concede a goal or if a 10th goal that they scored in the last minute of the match wasn't canceled.) | Final round |
| 2 | Panionios (Q) | 14 | 10 | 1 | 3 | 45 | 19 | 2.368 | 35 | Final round |
| 3 | Panathinaikos | 14 | 9 | 2 | 3 | 33 | 12 | 2.750 | 34 | |
| 4 | Apollon Athens | 14 | 7 | 3 | 4 | 27 | 21 | 1.286 | 31 | |
| 5 | Asteras Athens | 14 | 5 | 5 | 4 | 19 | 18 | 1.056 | 29 | |
| 6 | Fostiras | 14 | 4 | 3 | 7 | 27 | 33 | 0.818 | 25 | |
| 7 | Athinaikos | 14 | 2 | 1 | 11 | 13 | 33 | 0.394 | 19 | |
| 8 | Enosi Pangrati | 14 | 1 | 0 | 13 | 11 | 56 | 0.196 | 16 | |

Source: rsssf
(Q) Qualified for the phase indicated

=== Piraeus Football Clubs Association ===
| Pos | Team | Pld | GF | GA | GD | Pts | Qualification |
|---|---|---|---|---|---|---|---|
| 1 | Olympiacos (Q) | 14 | 44 | 11 | +33 | 41 | Final round |
| 2 | Atromitos Piraeus (Q) | 14 | 37 | 14 | +13 | 35 | Final round |
| 3 | Ethnikos Piraeus | 14 | 31 | 16 | +15 | 32 | |
| 4 | Proodeftiki | 14 | 23 | 14 | +9 | 28 | |
| 5 | Amyna Nikaia | 14 | 22 | 33 | -11 | 26 | |
| 6 | Aris Piraeus | 14 | 17 | 40 | -23 | 21 | |
| 7 | AE Neapoli | 14 | 10 | 33 | -23 | 21 | |
| 8 | Argonaftis Piraeus | 14 | 15 | 38 | -23 | 18 | |

=== Macedonia Football Clubs Association ===
| Pos | Team | Pld | GF | GA | GD | Pts | Qualification |
|---|---|---|---|---|---|---|---|
| 1 | Makedonikos (Q) | 10 | 25 | 13 | +12 | 24 | Final round |
| 2 | Iraklis (Q) | 10 | 20 | 10 | +10 | 23 | Final round |
| 3 | Aris | 10 | 20 | 20 | 0 | 20 | |
| 4 | Megas Alexandros | 10 | 17 | 23 | -6 | 19 | |
| 5 | PAOK | 10 | 16 | 13 | +3 | 18 | |
| 6 | Apollon Kalamarias | 10 | 8 | 27 | -19 | 15 | |

== Final round ==
=== League table ===
| Pos | Team | Pld | W | D | L | GF | GA | GD | Pts |
|---|---|---|---|---|---|---|---|---|---|
| 1 | Olympiacos (C) | 10 | 7 | 1 | 2 | 27 | 11 | +16 | 25 |
| 2 | Iraklis (Note: Iraklis has a defeat without a match and –1 point.) | 10 | 6 | 3 | 1 | 19 | 10 | +9 | 24 |
| 3 | Panionios | 10 | 6 | 1 | 3 | 23 | 17 | +6 | 23 |
| 4 | Atromitos Piraeus | 10 | 3 | 2 | 5 | 12 | 21 | −9 | 18 |
| 5 | AEK Athens (Note: AEK has a defeat without a match and –1 point.) | 10 | 3 | 1 | 6 | 13 | 16 | −3 | 16 |
| 6 | Makedonikos (Note: Makedonikos has two defeats without a match and –2 points.) | 10 | 0 | 0 | 10 | 13 | 36 | −23 | 8 |

Source: rsssf
(C) Champions

=== Results ===
| Home \ Away | OLY | IRA | PAN | ATR | AEK | MAK |
|---|---|---|---|---|---|---|
| Olympiacos | | 1–1 | 5–1 | 4–1 | 2–3 | 3–1 |
| Iraklis | 2–1 | | 2–1 | 4–1 | — (Note: Suspended at 60th minute. Both teams were zeroed.) | 4–1 |
| Panionios | 0–4 | 1–1 | | 5–0 | 2–0 | 8–4 |
| Atromitos Piraeus | 0–2 | 1–1 | 0–1 | | 1–0 | 2–0 (Note: Makedonikos did not show up for the match. Awarded 2–0 to Atromitos Piraeus.) |
| AEK Athens | 0–2 | 0–1 | 1–2 | 2–2 | | 4–1 |
| Makedonikos | 2–3 | 1–3 | 0–2 (Note: Makedonikos did not show up for the match. Awarded 2–0 to Panionios.) | 2–4 | 1–3 | |

Source: rsssf
Legend: Blue = home team win; Yellow = draw; Red = away team win.

== Top scorers ==
| Rank | Player | Club | Goals |
|---|---|---|---|
| 1 | (Greece) Giannis Vazos | Olympiacos | 12 |
| 2 | (Greece) Spyros Papadakis | Iraklis | 6 |
| 2 | (Greece) Ilias Papageorgiou | Atromitos Piraeus | 6 |
