= 1932–33 Panhellenic Championship =

5th season of top-tier football league in Greece

Panhellenic Championship
- Season: 1932–33
- Champions: Olympiacos; 2nd Greek title
- Relegated: none
- Matches: 5
- Goals: 19 (3.8 per match)
- Top goalscorer: Giannis Vazos (6 goals)
- Biggest home win: Olympiacos 5–0 Aris
- Biggest away win: AEK Athens 1–5 Olympiacos
- Highest scoring: Olympiacos 5–0 Aris
- Longest winning run: Olympiacos (4 matches)
- Longest unbeaten run: Olympiacos (4 matches)
- Longest winless run: AEK Athens (3 matches)
- Longest losing run: AEK Athens (3 matches)

The 1932–33 Panhellenic Championship was the fifth season of the highest football league of Greece. It was held in two groups, the South and the North.

The South Group was formed by 5 teams which resulted as follows:

- Athenian Association: The 3 teams qualified in the previous season.
- Piraeus' Association: The 2 teams qualified in the previous season.

The North Group was formed by 3 teams which resulted as follows:

- Macedonian Association: The 3 teams qualified in the previous season.

These teams did not participate in the local championships and their stay in the national division was judged by ranking matches. Finally, the teams that participated in the final phase of the championship resulted as follows:

- South Group: The first 2 teams of the ranking.
- North Group: The winner.

Olympiacos won their 2nd championship and their 1st undefeated. Panathinaikos finished last and were relegated. However, in September 1933 the rules changed and with the abolition of the national category, Panathinaikos took place in the next season's national championship.

The point system was: Win: 2 points - Draw: 1 point - Loss: 0 points.

== Semi-final round ==
=== South Group ===
Pos	Team	Pld	W	D	L	GF	GA	GD	Pts	Qualification	OLY	AEK	APOL	ETH	PAO
1	Olympiacos (Q)	8	6	0	2	13	7	+6	12	Final round		3–0	2–0	2–0	2–0 (Note: The match was held on 9/4/1933 and was stopped in the middle of the second half with the hosts leading 2–1, due to the unsuitability of the stadium from the continuous rain. It was set to be repeated from the beginning, but in the end it was awarded 2-0 without a match in favor of Olympiacos, when Panathinaikos refused to compete again at the Velodrome.)
2	AEK Athens (Q)	8	4	2	2	17	14	+3	10	Final round	3–0		2–2	3–0	3–2
3	Apollon Athens	8	3	3	2	12	8	+4	9		0–2	2–0		4–0	2–2
4	Ethnikos Piraeus	8	2	1	5	5	13	−8	5		1–2	0–3	0–0		1–0
5	Panathinaikos	8	1	2	5	11	16	−5	4		3–0	4–4	0–2 (Note: Without games, as Panathinaikos had withdrawn by continuation of the event as a sign of protest against the previous decisions of the HFF.)	0–2	

Source: rsssf
(Q) Qualified for the phase indicated

==== Top scorers ====
Rank	Player	Club	Goals
1	(Greece) Mimis Pierrakos	Panathinaikos	5
1	(Greece) Panagiotis Sourmelis	Panathinaikos	5
3	(Greece) Robert Mallios Galić	AEK Athens	4
3	(Greece) Chatzisavvas	Apollon Athens	4
5	(Greece) Dimitris Mougras	AEK Athens	3
5	(Greece) Leonidas Andrianopoulos	Olympiacos	3
5	(Greece) Christoforos Rangos	Olympiacos	3
5	(Greece) Theologos Symeonidis	Olympiacos	3
5	(Greece) Pananos	Apollon Athens	3
5	(Greece) Prokopiou	Apollon Athens	3

=== North Group ===
Pos	Team	Pld	W	D	L	GF	GA	GD	Pts	Qualification	ARIS	IRA	MEG
1	Aris (Q)	4	2	2	0	9	3	+6	6	Final round		3–0	3–0 (Note: The match was originally held on 19/2/1933 and ended 7–0 in favor of Aris, but was canceled and repeated on 19/3/1933, when Aris won again 3–0.)
2	Iraklis	4	2	1	1	10	10	0	5		2–2		4–2
3	Megas Alexandros	4	0	1	3	6	12	−6	1		1–1	3–4	

Source: rsssf
(Q) Qualified for the phase indicated

==== Top scorers ====
Rank	Player	Club	Goals
1	(Greece) Odysseas Charistou	Iraklis	4
2	(Greece) Daniil Danelian	Aris	3
2	(Greece) Nikos Kitsos	Aris	3
2	(Greece) Spyros Chatzitsiros	Iraklis	3
5	(Greece) Zacharias Efstathiadis	Iraklis	2
6	(Greece) Nikolaos Angelakis	Aris	1
6	(Greece) Kostas Gikopoulos	Aris	1
6	(Greece) Odysseas Askepidis	Iraklis	1
6	(Greece) Christoforos Vogas	Iraklis	1
6	(Greece) Nikos Miliopoulos	Iraklis	1
6	(Greece) Alvertos Namias	Iraklis	1
6	(Greece) Dinopoulos	Megas Alexandros	1
6	(Greece) Kechagias	Megas Alexandros	1
6	(Greece) Zalidas	Megas Alexandros	1
6	(Greece) Zakapidas	Megas Alexandros	1
6	(Greece) Kavounis	Megas Alexandros	1
6	(Greece) Fylleridis	Megas Alexandros	1

== Final round ==
=== League table ===
Pos	Team	Pld	W	D	L	GF	GA	GD	Pts	OLY	ARIS	AEK
1	Olympiacos (C)	4	4	0	0	13	3	+10	8		5–0	2–0 (Note: Match suspended. Awarded 2–0 to Olympiacos.)
2	Aris	3	1	0	2	4	9	−5	2	2–3		— (Note: Canceled due to extended heat and also because the championship had already been decided.)
3	AEK Athens	3	0	0	3	2	7	−5	0	1–3	1–2	

Source: rsssf
(C) Champions

== Top scorers ==
Rank	Player	Club	Goals
1	(Greece) Giannis Vazos	Olympiacos	6
2	(Greece) Theologos Simeonidis	Olympiacos	4
3	(Greece) Leonidas Andrianopoulos	Olympiacos	3
4	(Greece) Dimitris Mougras	AEK Athens	2
4	(Greece) Argyris Argyriadis	Aris	2
6	(Greece) Nikolaos Angelakis	Aris	1
6	(Greece) Theodoros Befas	Aris	1
6	(Greece) Robert Mallios Galić	AEK Athens	1
6	(Greece) Christoforos Rangos	Olympiacos	1
