= 1946–47 Greek Football Cup =

1946–47 Greek Cup
Tournament details
- Country: Greece
- Teams: 97

Final positions
- Champions: Olympiacos (1st title)
- Runners-up: Iraklis

Tournament statistics
- Matches played: 108
- Goals scored: 381 (3.53 per match)

The 1946–47 Greek Football Cup was the fifth edition of the Greek Football Cup. It was the first Greek Cup tournament to be held after the end of World War II. The competition culminated with the Greek Cup final, held at Leoforos Alexandras Stadium, on 8 June 1947. The match was contested by Olympiacos and Iraklis, with Olympiacos winning by 5–0.

== Calendar ==
Round	Date(s)	Fixtures	Clubs	New entries
First Round	13, 27 October 1946	11	97 → 87	26
Second Round	27 October, 17 November 1946	14	87 → 74	24
Third Round	17, 30 November 1946	20	74 → 56	24
Additional Round	1, 5, 6 & 26 December 1946	9	56 → 51	3
Fourth Round	8, 29 December 1946	9	51 → 44	9
Fifth Round	22, 26 December 1946 & 12 January 1947	9	44 → 35	none
Sixth Round	2, 6, 19 January 1947	11	35 → 24	4
Seventh Round	9 February 1947	6	24 → 18	none
Eighth Round	2, 5 March 1947	3	18 → 16	none
Round of 16	9 March 1947	9	16 → 8	7
Quarter-finals	11 May 1947	4	8 → 4	none
Semi-finals	21,22 May 1947	2	4 → 2	none
Final	8 June 1947	1	2 → 1	none

== Qualification round ==
=== First round ===
Team 1	Score/Agg.	Team 2	Match	Replay
Athens Football Clubs Association
Dapfni Athens	6–0	Kallithaikos		
Armeniki	2–1	Yperochi		
Viktoria	2–1 (a.e.t.)	Attikos		
Proodos Patisia	1–0	AE Nea Ionia		
Ethnikos Asteras	3–1 (a.e.t.)	Afovos		
Panerythraikos	bye			
Ilisiakos	bye			
Piraeus Football Clubs Association
Thiseas Piraeus	7–1	Falirikos		
Panelefsiniakos	8–1	AEK Piraeus		
AE Karava	6–2	Aiolikos Faliro		
Macedonia Football Clubs Association
PO Xirokrini	1–0	Meliteus		
Aias	1–3^{*}	Marathon Kiouri	0–0 (a.e.t.)	1–3^{*}
Apollon Kalamarias	bye			
Thermaikos	bye			
Megas Alexandros Thessaloniki	bye			
MENT	bye			

=== Second round ===
Team 1	Score/Agg.	Team 2	Match	Replay
Athens Football Clubs Association
Esperos Kallitheas	1–0	Viktoria		
Mikrasiatiki	1–2	Armeniki		
Aris Athens	2–1	Dapfni Athens		
Panerythraikos	3–0	Agios Dimitrios		
Proodos Patisia	1–0	Atromitos		
Ilisiakos	3–0	Ethnikos Asteras		
Piraeus Football Clubs Association
Panelefsiniakos	6–1	Achileus Piraeus		
AE Karava	4–1	Filathloi		
Macedonia Football Clubs Association
Apollon Kalamarias	5–4	Thermaikos		
Megas Alexandros Thessaloniki	bye			
MENT	bye			
Patras Football Clubs Association
Achilleus Patras	5–0	Patreus	2–2 (a.e.t.)	5–0
AEK Patras	3–0	Achaiki		
Panegialios	2–1	Ethnikos Aigio		
Panachaiki	bye			
Asteras Patras	bye			
Olympiakos Patras	bye			
Apollon Patras	bye			
Thessaly/Euboea Football Clubs Association
Pagasitikos Volos	2–1	Anagennisi Volos		
Iraklis Larissa	bye			
Kentavros Volos	bye			
Niki Volos	bye			
Olympiacos Volos	bye			

=== Third round ===
Team 1	Score/Agg.	Team 2	Match	Replay
Athens Football Clubs Association
Proodos Patisia	0–1	Ilisiakos		
Esperos Kallitheas	3–0	Armeniki		
Panerythraikos	1–1	Aris Athens		
Piraeus Football Clubs Association
Thiseas Piraeus	1–2	AE Karava		
Macedonia Football Clubs Association
PO Xirokrini	1–2	Marathon Kiouri		
Megas Alexandros Thessaloniki	bye			
MENT	bye			
Apollon Kalamarias	bye			
Patras Football Clubs Association
Panachaiki	7–5	Asteras Patras	3–3 (a.e.t.)	4–2
Olympiakos Patras	0–1	Apollon Patras		
Panegialios	3–0	Proodeftiki Patras		
Thrace/Eastern Macedonia Football Clubs Association
AEK Kavala	?	Vyron Kavala		
Aris Drama	?	Iason Prosotsanis		
Olympiacos Xanthi	1–0 (a.e.t.)	Tourkiki Enosis		
AE Komotini	?	Aris Alexadroupoli		
Filippoi Kavala	?	Iraklis Kavala		
Doxa Drama	?	Iraklis Prosotsanis		
Iraklis Serres	?	Ethnikos Sidirokastrou		
Elpis Drama	bye			
Doxa Xanthi	bye			
Aspida Xanthi	bye			
Apollon Serres	bye			
Iraklis Pentapolis	bye			
Thessaly/Euboea Football Clubs Association
Iraklis Larissa	3–0	Kentavros Volos		
Niki Volos	4–3	Olympiacos Volos		
Crete Football Clubs Association
Ergotelis	?	Iraklis Heraklion		
EGOH	?	OFI		

=== Additional round ===
Team 1	Score/Agg.	Team 2	Match	Replay	Replay
Athens Football Clubs Association
Panerythraikos	1–2	Aris Athens	?	1–2	—
Piraeus Football Clubs Association
Amyna Piraeus^{**}	5–5	Argonaftis Piraeus	0–0 (a.e.t.)	4–4 (a.e.t.)	1–1 (a.e.t.)
Patras Football Clubs Association
Iraklis Pyrgos	3–1	AEK Patras			
Thrace/Eastern Macedonia Football Clubs Association
Doxa Xanthi	0–6	Aspida Xanthi			
Apollon Serres	1–0	Iraklis Pentapolis			
Thessaly/Euboea Football Clubs Association
Iraklis Larissa	2–4	Pagasitikos Volos			

=== Fourth round ===
Team 1	Score/Agg.	Team 2	Match	Replay
Athens Football Clubs Association
Apollon Athens	5–0	Ilisiakos		
Fostiras	3–4	Aris Athens		
Panionios	7–5	Esperos Kallitheas	2–2 (a.e.t.)	5–3
Athinaikos	2–0	AE Pangrati		
Piraeus Football Clubs Association
Panelefsiniakos	7–2	Aris Piraeus		
Atromitos Piraeus	5–0	Neapolis		
Proodeftiki	8–2	AE Karava		
Macedonia Football Clubs Association
Megas Alexandros Thessaloniki	6–3^{***}	MENT		

=== Fifth round ===
Team 1	Score/Agg.	Team 2	Match	Replay
Macedonia Football Clubs Association
Megas Alexandros Thessaloniki	3–1	Apollon Kalamarias		
Patras Football Clubs Association
Panachaiki	2–1	Panegialios		
Thrace/Eastern Macedonia Football Clubs Association
AEK Kavala	?	Filippoi/Iraklis Kavala		
Elpis Drama	?	Aris Drama		
Aspida Xanthi	?	Olympiacos Xanthi		
Apollon Serres^{****}	?	Iraklis Serres	?	?
Doxa Drama	bye			
AE Komotini	bye			
Thessaly/Euboea Football Clubs Association
Niki Volos	3–2	Pagasitikos Volos	?	3–2

=== Sixth round ===
Team 1	Score	Team 2
Athens Football Clubs Association
Apollon Athens	3–0	Athinaikos
Panionios	3–4	Aris Athens
Piraeus Football Clubs Association
Atromitos Piraeus	1–3	Proodeftiki
Panelefsiniakos	5–4 (a.e.t.)	Amyna Piraeus
Macedonia Football Clubs Association
Iraklis	10–1	Marathon Kiouri
Megas Alexandros Thessaloniki	?	Hellas Florina
Patras Football Clubs Association
Panetolikos	1–7	Apollon Patras
Achilleus Patras	1–0 (a.e.t.)	Iraklis Pyrgos
Thrace/Eastern Macedonia Football Clubs Association
Elpis Drama	2–0	Doxa Drama
Apollon Serres	bye	
Aspida Xanthi	bye	
AE Komotini	bye	
AEK Kavala	bye	
Thessaly/Euboea Football Clubs Association
Niki Volos	2–1	Enosis Chalkida
Crete Football Clubs Association
OFI	6–2	Ergotelis

=== Seventh round ===
Team 1	Score	Team 2
Athens Football Clubs Association
Aris Athens	3–2	Apollon Athens
Piraeus Football Clubs Association
Proodeftiki	1–4	Panelefsiniakos
Macedonia Football Clubs Association
Iraklis	2–0	Megas Alexandros Thessaloniki
Patras Football Clubs Association
Achilleus Patras	2–1	Apollon Patras
Panachaiki	bye	
Thrace/Eastern Macedonia Football Clubs Association
Elpis Drama	5–0	Apollon Serres
Aspida Xanthi	4–1	AE Komotini
AEK Kavala	bye	

=== Eighth round ===
Team 1	Score/Agg.	Team 2	Match	Replay
Patras Football Clubs Association
Achilleus Patras	2–1	Panachaiki	0–0 (a.e.t.)	2–1
Thrace/Eastern Macedonia Football Clubs Association
AEK Kavala	2–0	Aspida Xanthi		

^{*} According to some reports the final score was 1–2.

^{**} After the third match a draw occurred which favoured Amyna Piraeus.

^{***} According to some reports the final score was 8–3.

^{****} The first match ended up as a draw and Apollon Serres won after a replay match.

== Knockout phase ==
In the knockout phase, teams play against each other over a single match. If the match ends up as a draw, extra time will be played and if the match remains a draw a replay match is set at the home of the guest team which the extra time rule stands as well. That procedure will be repeated until a winner occurs.
The mechanism of the draws for each round is as follows:

- In the draw for the round of 16, the eight top teams of each association are seeded and the eight clubs that passed the qualification round are unseeded.
  The seeded teams are drawn against the unseeded teams.
- In the draws for the quarter-finals onwards, there are no seedings, and teams from the same group can be drawn against each other.

== Bracket ==
Round of 16
Olympiacos (w/o)	0	2
Panathinaikos	0	0
Ethnikos Piraeus	2	6
Asteras Athens	2	1
Achilleas Patra	2
AEK Athens	1
Aris Athens	5
OFI	0
Elpida Drama	2
Iraklis	6
AEK Kavala	0
Aris	1
Niki Volos	1
Panelefsiniakos	0
PAOK	2
Makedonikos	3

Quarter-finals
Olympiacos	2
Ethnikos Piraeus	0
Achilleas Patra	2
Aris Athens	1
Iraklis	2
Aris	0
Niki Volos	3
Makedonikos	2

Semi-finals
Olympiacos	4
Achilleas Patra	1
Iraklis	3
Niki Volos	0

Final
Olympiacos	5
Iraklis	0

== Round of 16 ==
Team 1	Score/Agg.	Team 2	Match	Replay
Aris Athens	5–0	OFI		
Achilleas Patra	2–1	AEK Athens		
PAOK	2–3	Makedonikos		
Niki Volos	1–0	Panelefsiniakos		
Elpida Drama	2–6	Iraklis		
AEK Kavala	0–1	Aris		
Ethnikos Piraeus	8–3	Asteras Athens	2–2 (a.e.t.)	6–1
Olympiacos	2–0	Panathinaikos	0–0 (a.e.t.)	2–0 (w/o)

== Quarter-finals ==
Team 1	Score	Team 2
Iraklis	2–0	Aris
Olympiacos	2–0	Ethnikos Piraeus
Niki Volos	3–2	Makedonikos
Achilleas Patra	2–1	Aris Athens

== Semi-finals ==
Team 1	Score	Team 2
Olympiacos	4–1	Achilleas Patra
Iraklis	3–0	Niki Volos

== Final ==
8 June 1947
17:30 EET

Olympiacos	5–0	Iraklis
Vazos 13', 31', 78'; Vasiliadis 17'; Chatzistavridis 79'	Report

Leoforos Alexandras Stadium, Athens
Attendance: 12,000
Referee: Sotiris Asprogerakas (Athens)
