= List of Greek football championship top scorers =

== By season ==
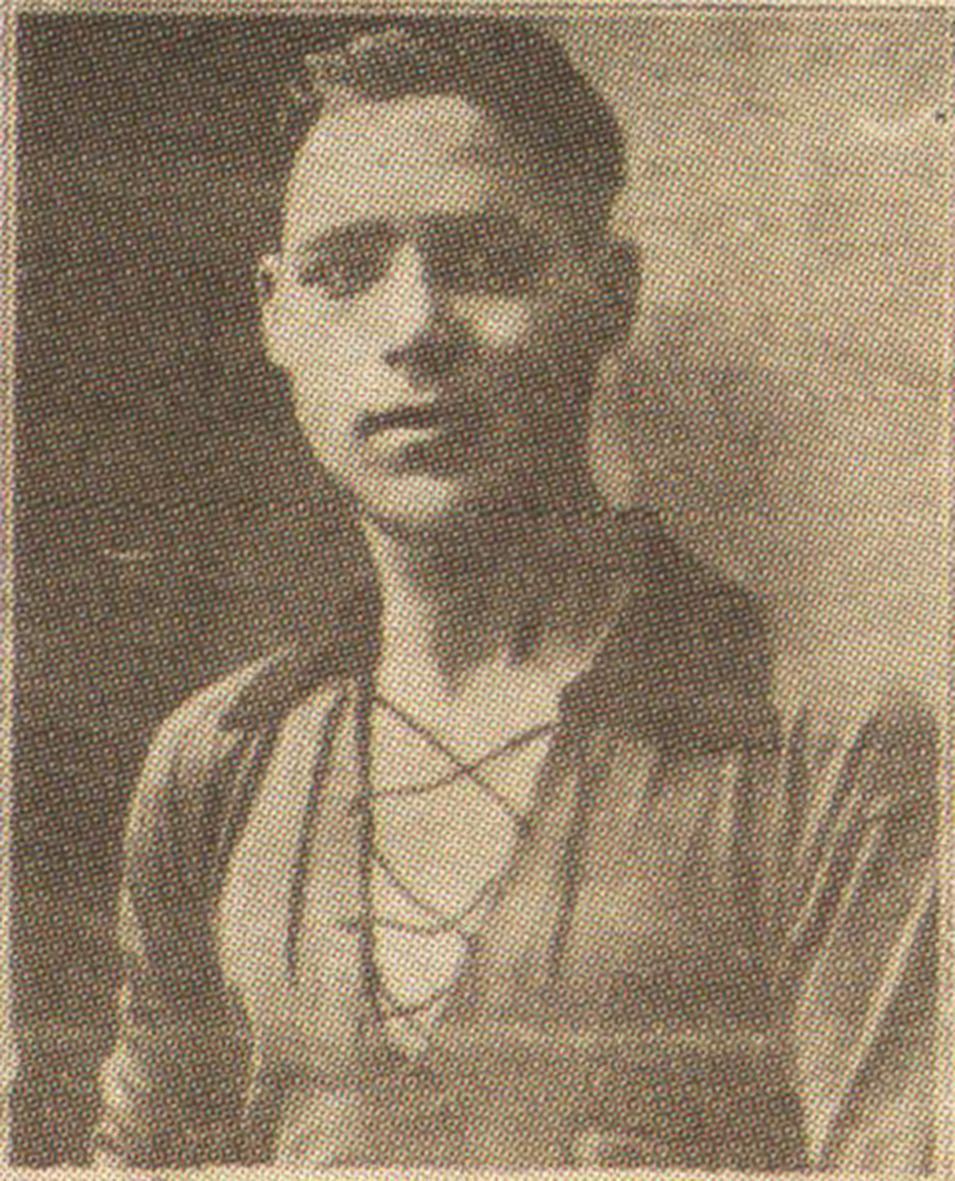
Nikolaos Angelakis, top scorer of the 1st championship.

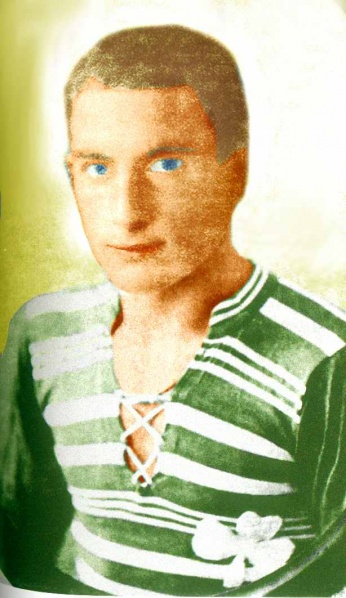
Angelos Messaris was the top scorer of the 2nd championship.

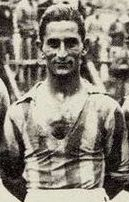
Giannis Vazos, 4 times top scorer.

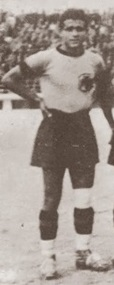
Kostas Vasiliou, the first non-Greek and the only Cypriot top scorer.

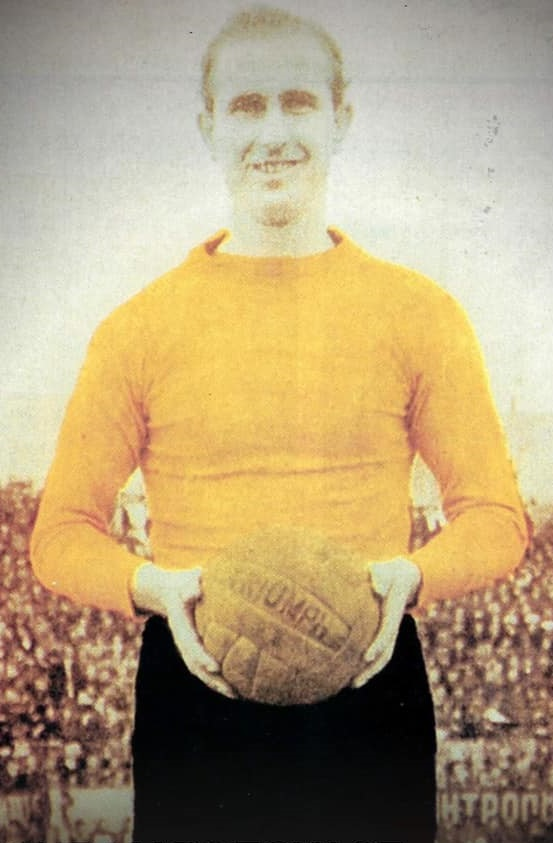
Kleanthis Maropoulos was the last top scorer before the WWII.

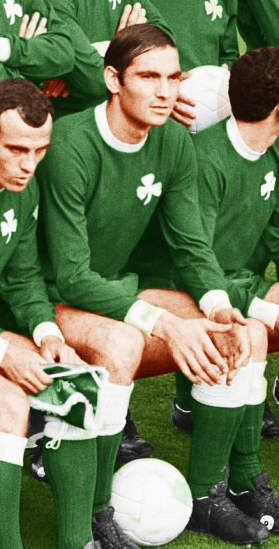
Antonis Antoniadis, a record 5 times top scorer.

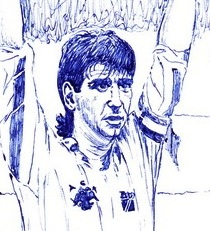
Thomas Mavros, the record top scorer of the championship with 260 goals.

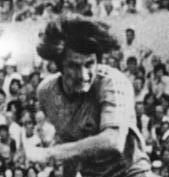
Dušan Bajević, was the 2nd foreign top scorer after Calcaterra.

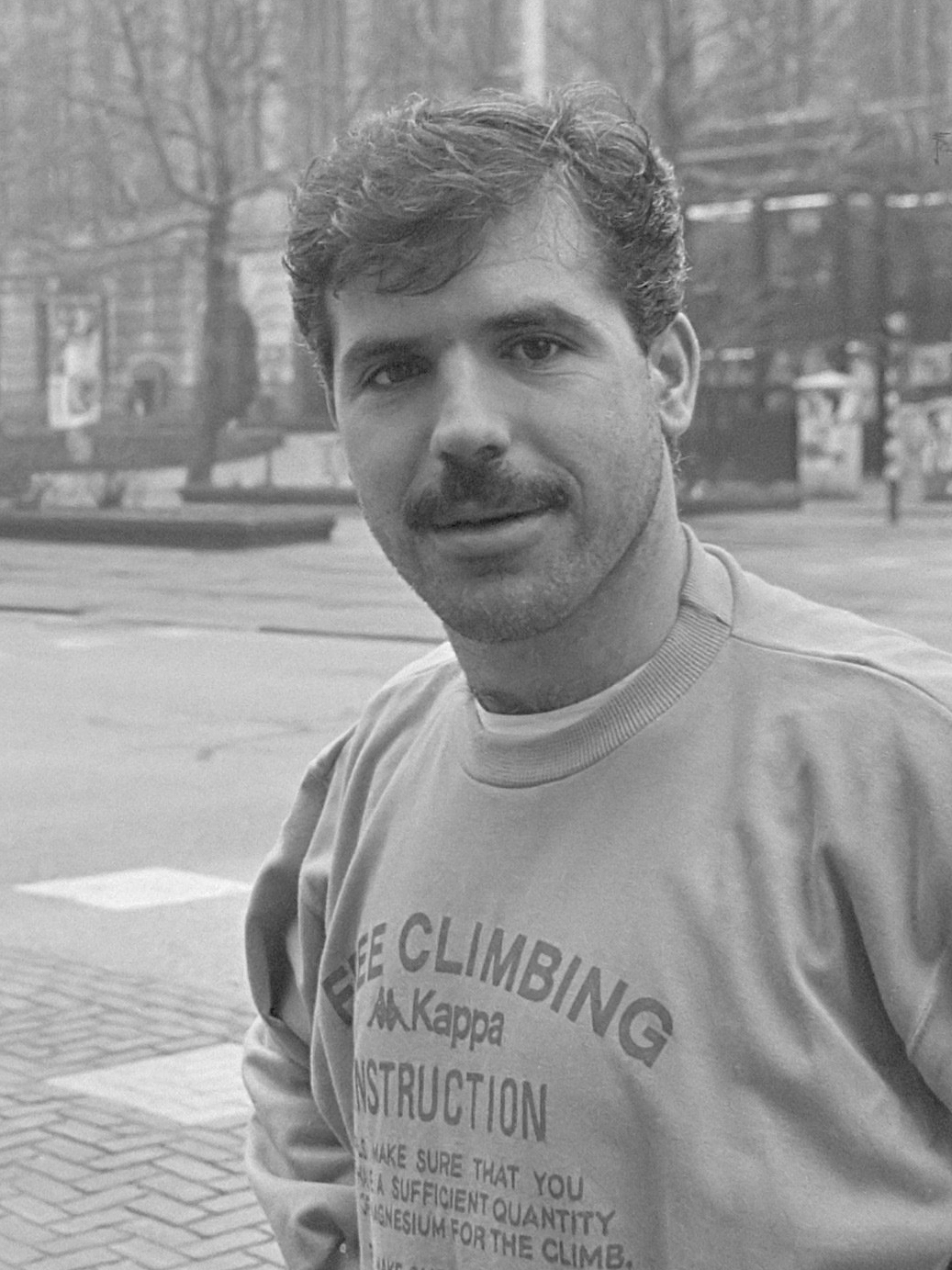
Nikos Anastopoulos was 3 times top scorer and the all-time Greece's top scorer

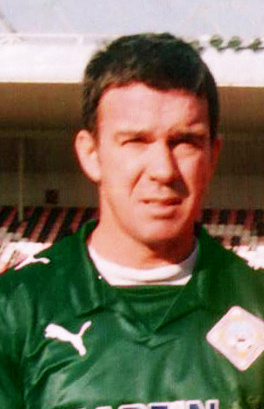
Dimitris Saravakos was the top scorer of the 1990–91 season.

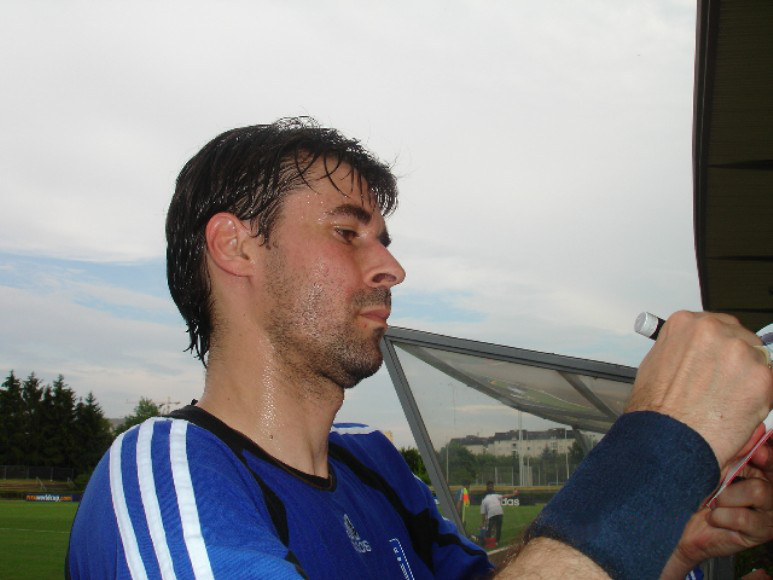
Vasilios Tsiartas was the top scorer of the 1995–96 season.

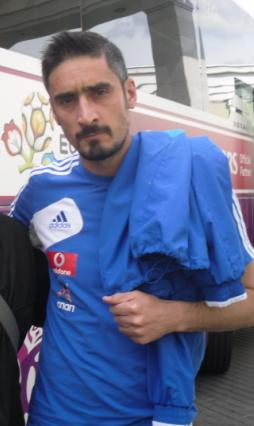
Nikos Liberopoulos won the top scorer award with both AEK Athens and Panathinaikos.

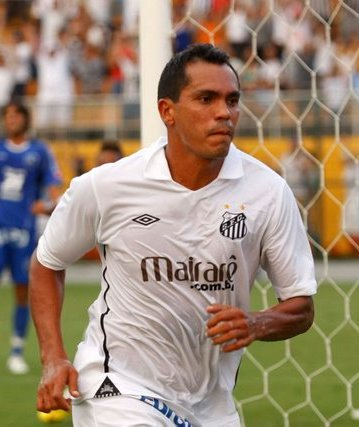
Giovanni was the only Brazilian to become the top scorer.

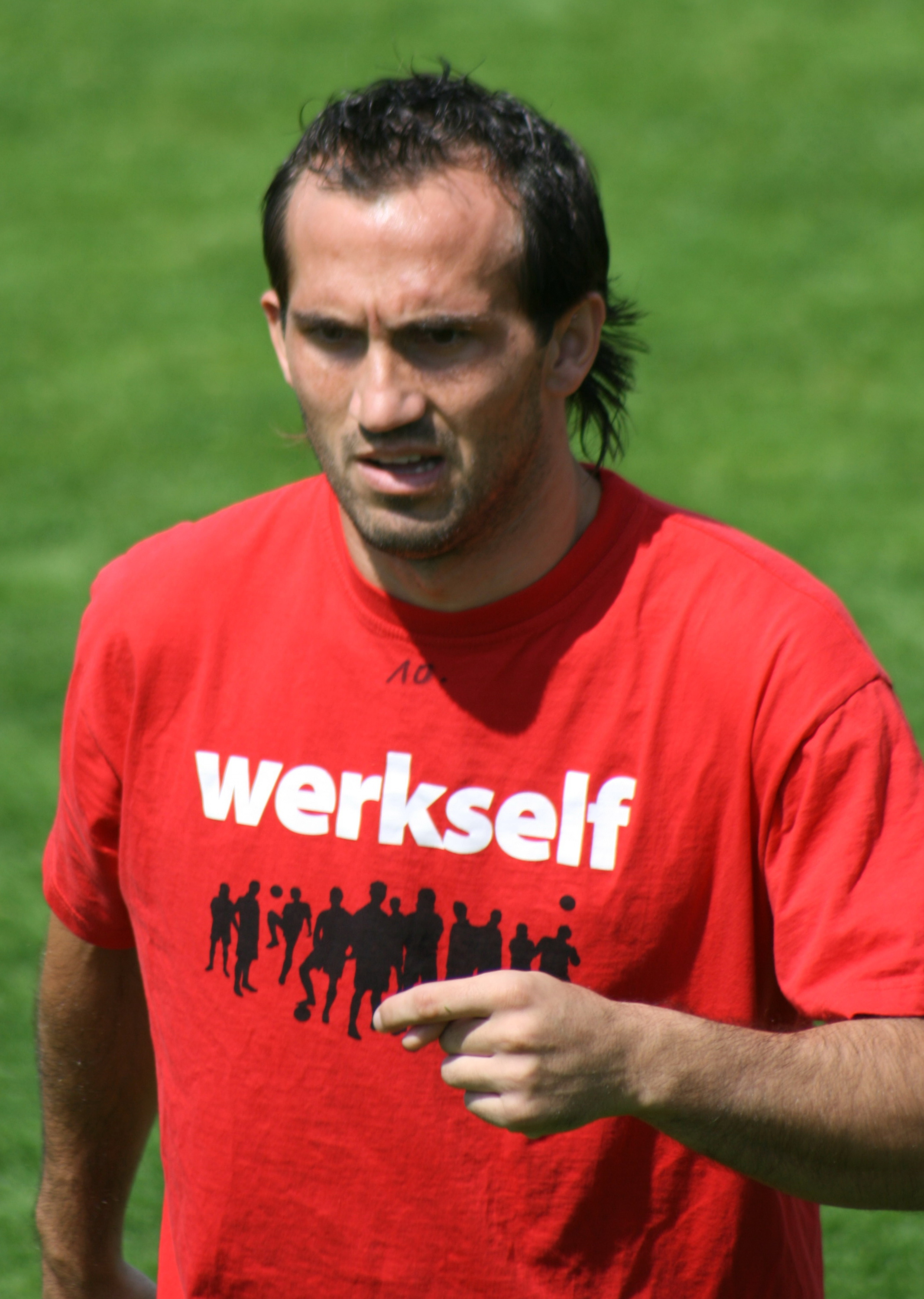
Theofanis Gekas was top scorer in 2005 playing with both Kallithea and Panathinaikos.

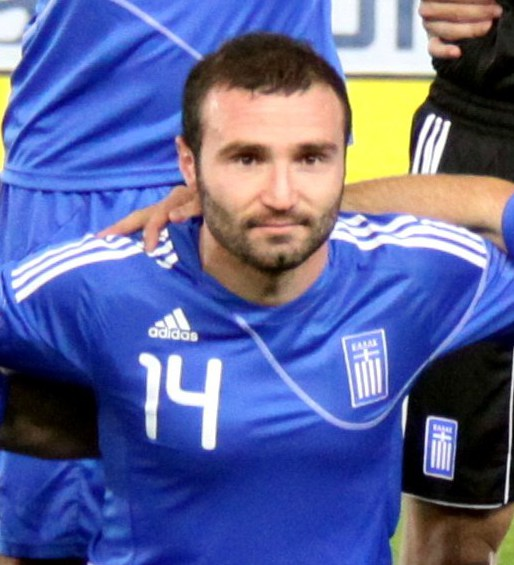
Dimitris Salpingidis was the top scorer in 2006.

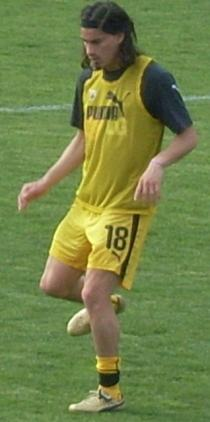
Ismael Blanco won twice the top scorer award.

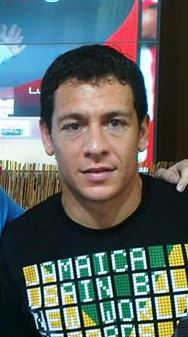
Luciano Galletti won the top scorer award in 2008–09 alongside Ismael Blanco.

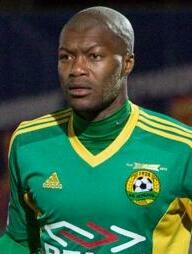
Djibril Cissé was the only French footballer to become top scorer.

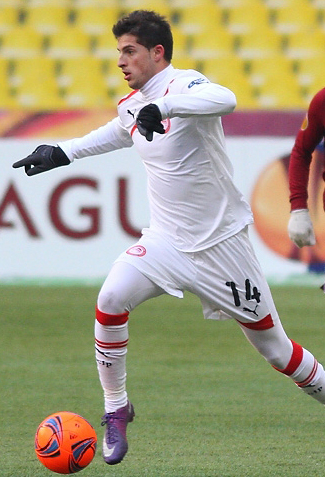
Kevin Mirallas, top scorer of the 2011–12 season.

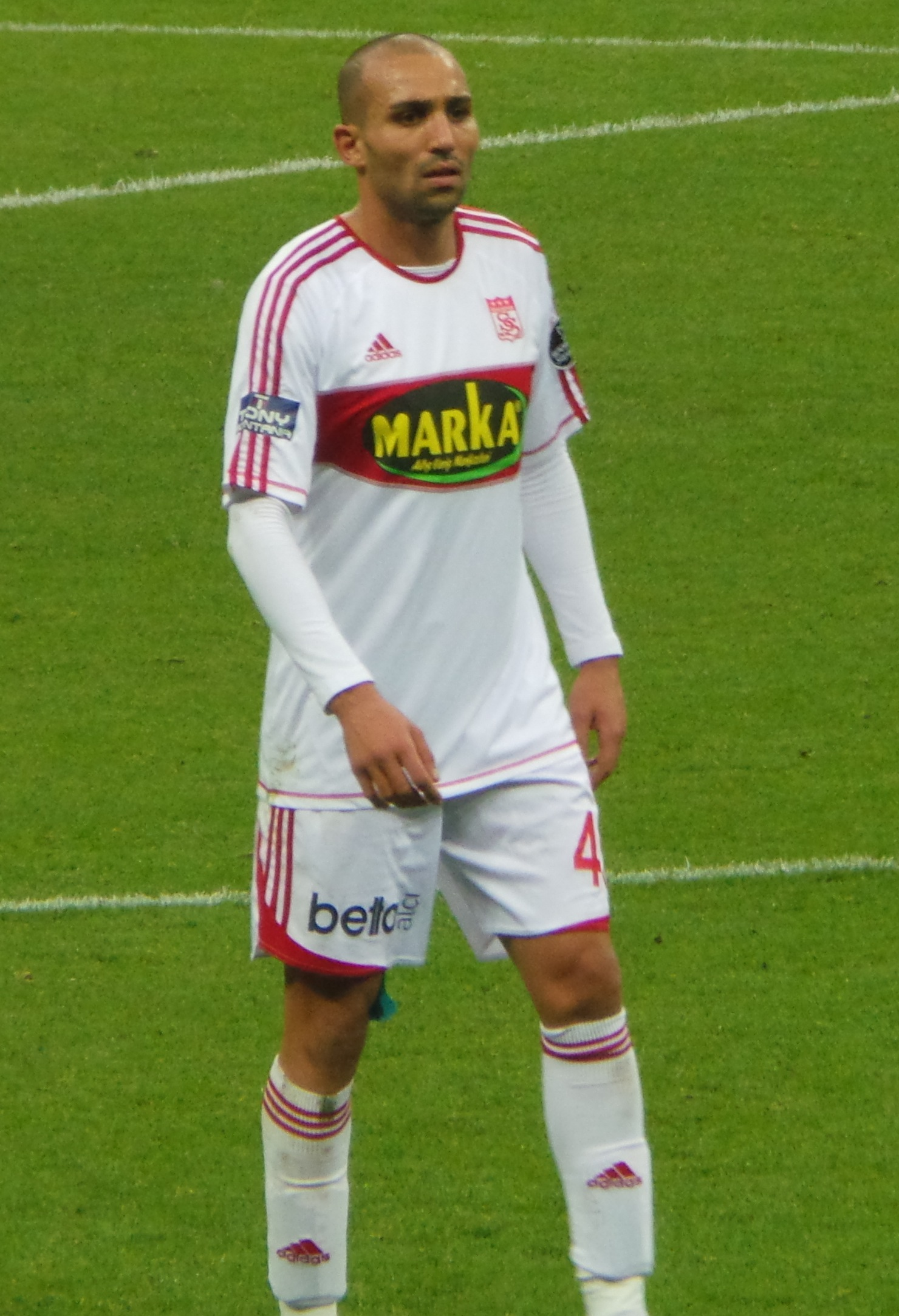
Rafik Djebbour, was the first African to claim the top scorer award.

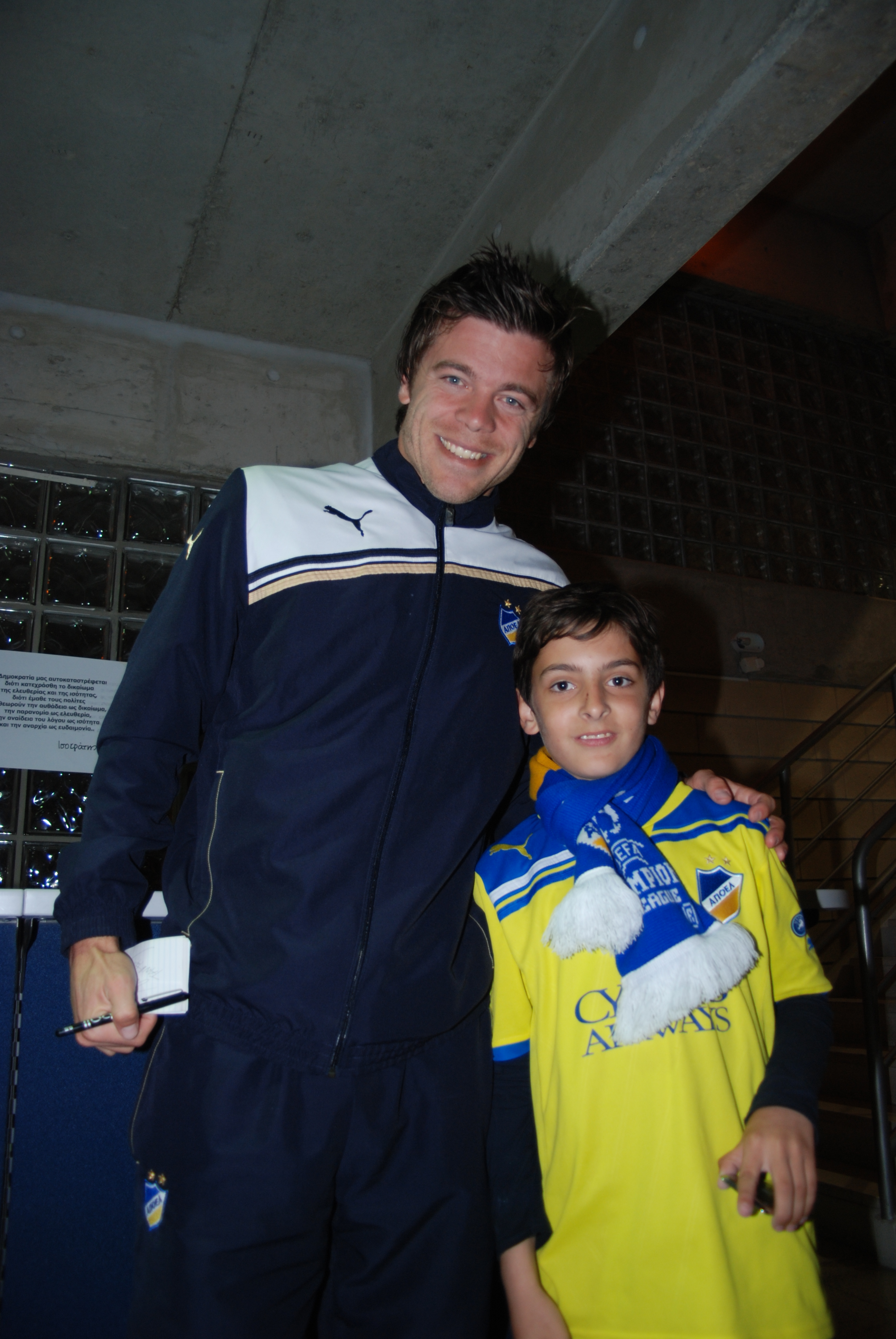
Esteban Solari was the top scorer of the in 2014.

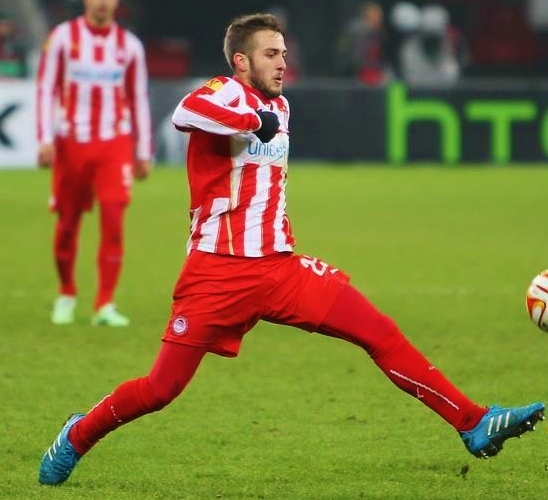
Kostas Fortounis was the top scorer and assist provider in 2015–16.

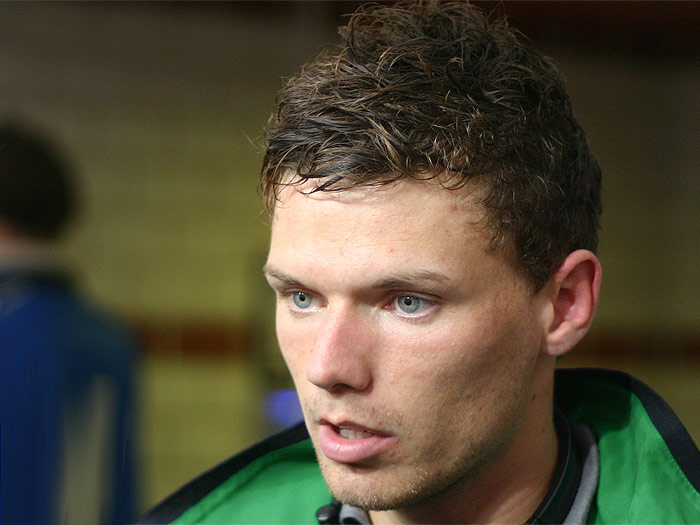
Marcus Berg was the only Swedish player to become top scorer.

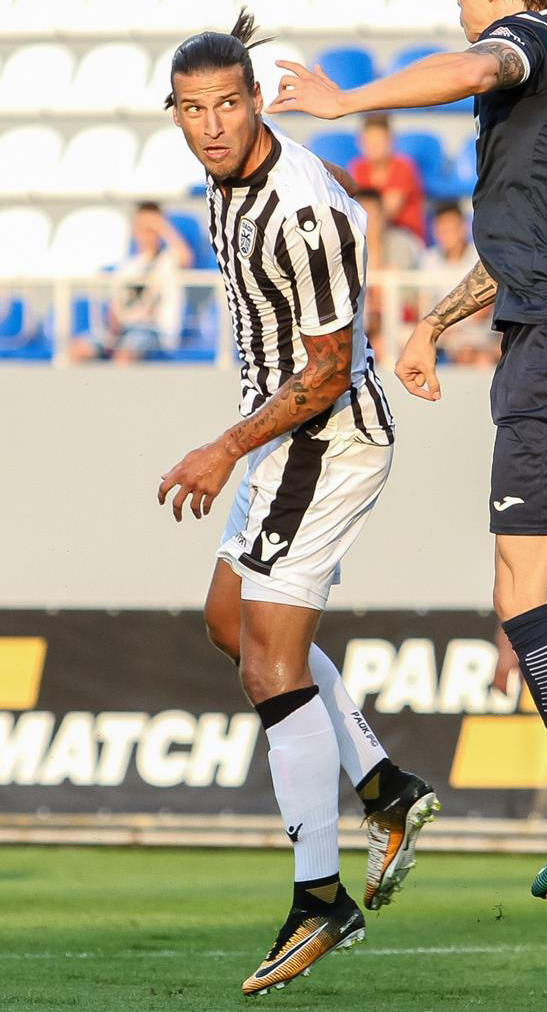
Aleksandar Prijović was the top scorer in 2017–18.

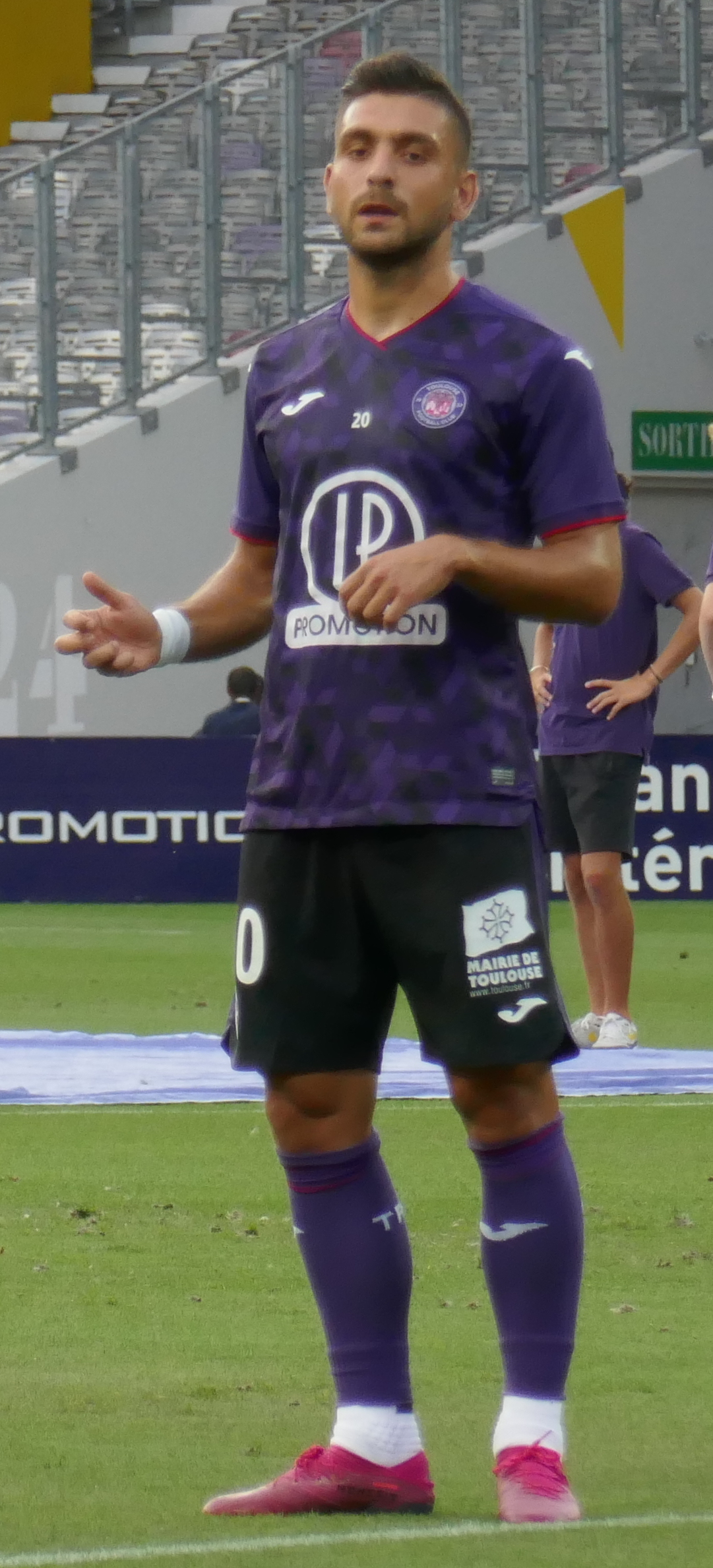
Efthymis Koulouris, top scorer of the 2018–19 season.

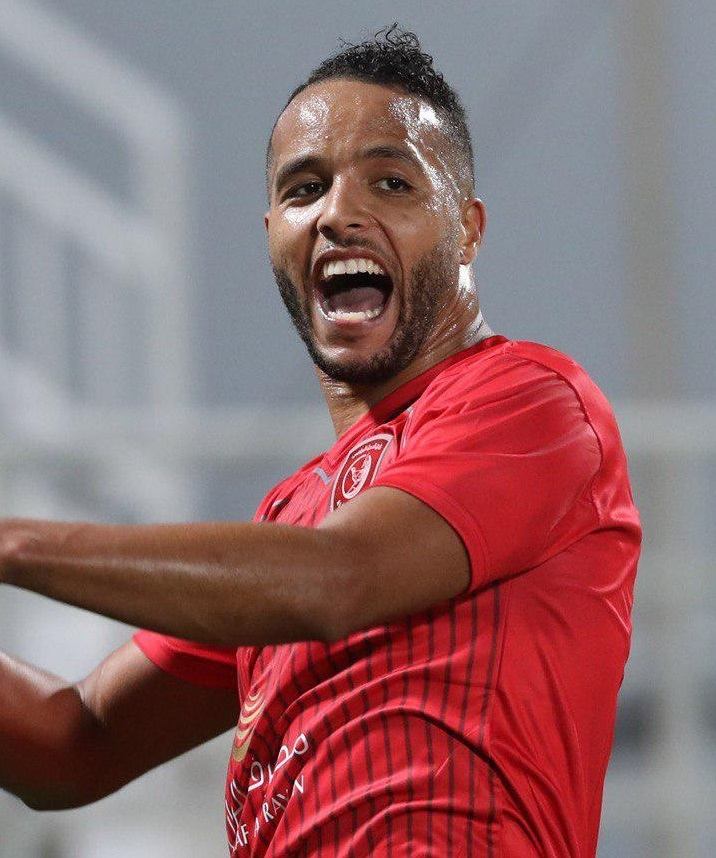
Youssef El-Arabi is the first Moroccan to become the top scorer.

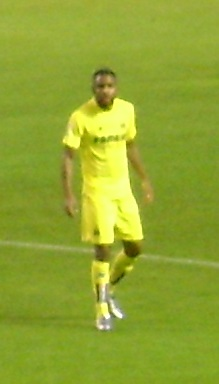
Cédric Bakambu was the top scorer in 2023.

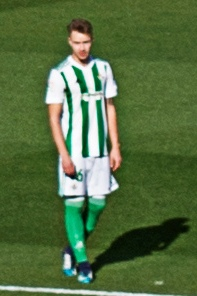
Loren Morón was the first Spanish to win the top scorer award.

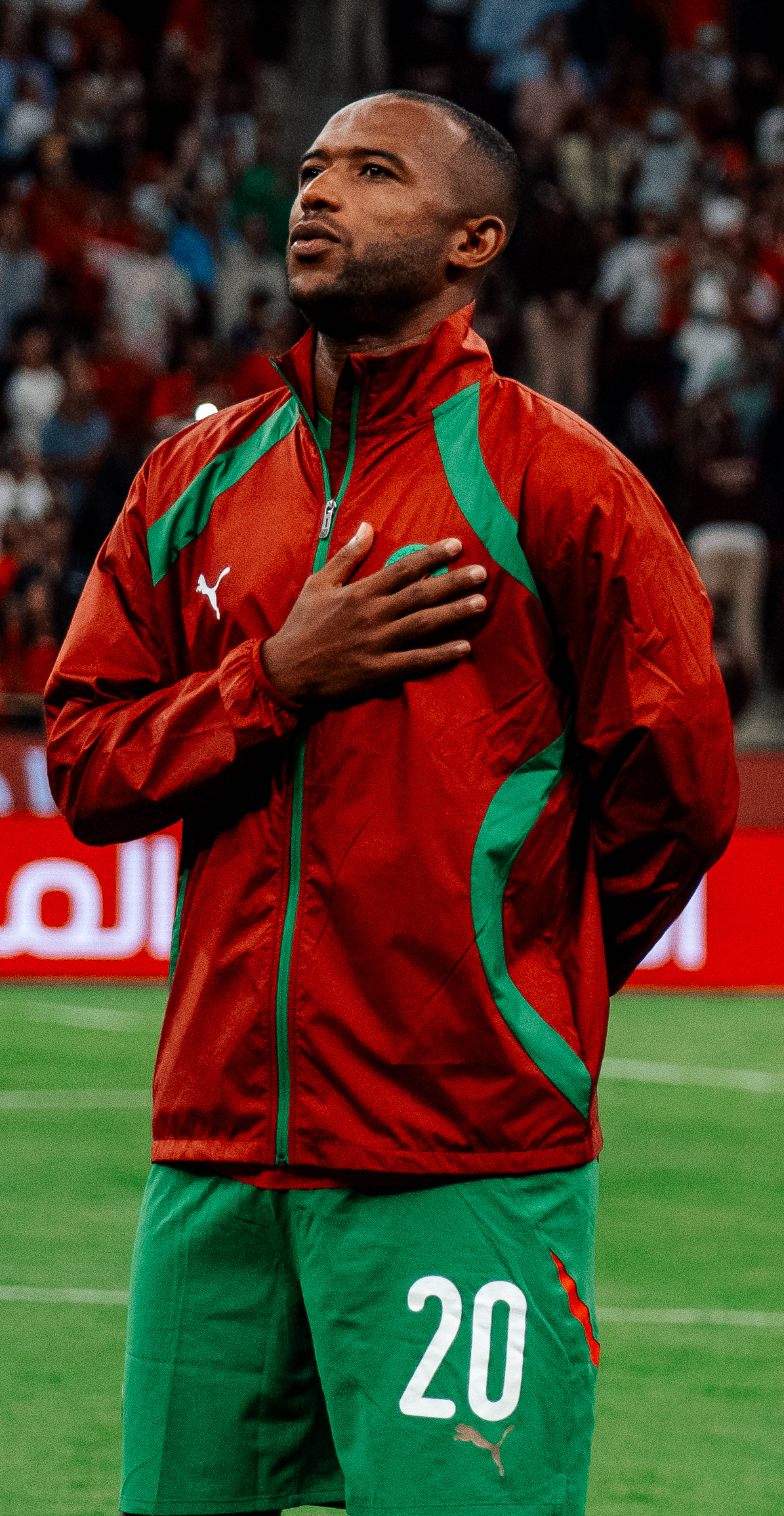
Ayoub El Kaabi was the top scorer in 2026.

| Season | Nat. | Name | Goals | Club(s) |
Panhellenic Championship era (1927–1959)
| 1927–28 | (Greece) | Nikolaos Angelakis | 4 | Aris |
| 1927–28 | (Greece) | Dionisis Kaltekis | 2 | Aris |
| 1927–28 | (Greece) | Christos Leontaridis | 2 | Aris |
| 1927–28 | (Greece) | Antonis Tsolinas | 2 | Ethnikos Piraeus |
| 1928–29 | Competition not held | | | |
| 1929–30 | (Greece) | Angelos Messaris | 7 | Panathinaikos |
| 1929–30 | (Greece) | Georgios Andrianopoulos | 4 | Olympiacos |
| 1929–30 | (Greece) | Mimis Pierrakos | 4 | Panathinaikos |
| 1930–31 | (Greece) | Nikos Kitsos | 13 | Aris |
| 1930–31 | (Greece) | Georgios Andrianopoulos | 12 | Olympiacos |
| 1930–31 | (Greece) | Mimis Pierrakos | 10 | Panathinaikos |
| 1931–32 | (Greece) | Nikos Kitsos (2) | 15 | Aris |
| 1931–32 | (Greece) | Nikolaos Angelakis | 14 | Aris |
| 1931–32 | (Greece) | Iordanis Papaiordanidis | 10 | PAOK |
| 1932–33 | (Greece) | Giannis Vazos | 6 | Olympiacos |
| 1932–33 | (Greece) | Theologos Simeonidis | 4 | Olympiacos |
| 1932–33 | (Greece) | Leonidas Andrianopoulos | 3 | Olympiacos |
| 1933–34 | (Greece) | Theologos Simeonidis | 3 | Olympiacos |
| 1933–34 | (Greece) | Nikos Grigoratos | 1 | Olympiacos |
| 1933–34 | (Greece) | Christoforos Rangos | 1 | Olympiacos |
| 1933–34 | (Greece) | Spyros Chatazitsiros | 1 | Iraklis |
| 1933–34 | (Greece) | Zacharias Efstathiadis | 1 | Iraklis |
| 1933–34 | (Greece) | Odysseas Charistou | 1 | Iraklis |
| 1934–35 | Competition not held | | | |
| 1935–36 | (Greece) | Kostas Choumis | 12 | Ethnikos Piraeus |
| 1935–36 | (Greece) | Giannis Vazos (2) | 12 | Olympiacos |
| 1935–36 | (Greece) | Anastasios Kritikos | 12 | Panathinaikos |
| 1935–36 | (Greece) | Kostas Kalogiannis | 12 | PAOK |
| 1936–37 | (Greece) | Giannis Vazos (3) | 4 | Olympiacos |
| 1936–37 | (Greece) | Theologos Simeonidis | 2 | Olympiacos |
| 1937–38 | (Greece) | Theologos Simeonidis (2) | 5 | Olympiacos |
| 1937–38 | (Greece) | Giannis Vazos | 4 | Olympiacos |
| 1937–38 | (Greece) | Christoforos Rangos | 3 | Olympiacos |
| 1937–38 | (Greece) | Stratos | 3 | Apollon Athens |
| 1938–39 | (Cyprus) | Kostas Vasiliou | 3 | AEK Athens |
| 1938–39 | (Greece) | Kleanthis Maropoulos | 2 | AEK Athens |
| 1938–39 | (Greece) | Giannis Frenelis | 2 | Iraklis |
| 1939–40 | (Greece) | Kleanthis Maropoulos | 2 | AEK Athens |
| 1939–40 | (Cyprus) | Kostas Vasiliou | 1 | AEK Athens |
| 1939–40 | (Greece) | Alekos Chatzistavridis | 1 | AEK Athens |
| 1939–40 | (Greece) | Giorgos Gasparis | 1 | AEK Athens |
| 1939–40 | (Greece) | Kostas Kalogiannis | 1 | PAOK |
| 1939–40 | (Greece) | Stefanos Feroutsos | 1 | PAOK |
| 1939–40 | (Greece) | Aristidis Ioannidis | 1 | PAOK |
| 1940–41 | Competition not held | | | |
| 1941–42 | Competition not held | | | |
| 1942–43 | Competition not held | | | |
| 1943–44 | Competition not held | | | |
| 1944–45 | Competition not held | | | |
| 1945–46 | (Greece) | Kleanthis Vikelidis | 3 | Aris |
| 1945–46 | (Greece) | Alekos Chatzistavridis | 2 | Olympiacos |
| 1945–46 | (Greece) | Giorgos Nikolois | 2 | AEK Athens |
| 1946–47 | (Greece) | Giannis Vazos (4) | 12 | Olympiacos |
| 1946–47 | (Greece) | Spyros Papadakis | 6 | Iraklis |
| 1946–47 | (Greece) | Ilias Papageorgiou | 6 | Atromitos Piraeus |
| 1947–48 | (Greece) | Stelios Christopoulos | 3 | Olympiacos |
| 1947–48 | (Greece) | Alekos Chatzistavridis | 2 | Olympiacos |
| 1947–48 | (Greece) | Stratos | 2 | Apollon Athens |
| 1948–49 | (Greece) | Vasilios Grigoriadis | 4 | Aris |
| 1948–49 | (Greece) | Stelios Christopoulos | 3 | Olympiacos |
| 1948–49 | (Greece) | Giannis Petsanas | 2 | Panathinaikos |
| 1948–49 | (Greece) | Alekos Chatzistavridis | 2 | Olympiacos |
| 1948–49 | (Greece) | Mimis Apostolopoulos | 2 | Olympiacos |
| 1949–50 | Competition not held | | | |
| 1950–51 | (Greece) | Georgios Darivas | 3 | Olympiacos |
| 1950–51 | (Greece) | Thanasis Bebis | 3 | Olympiacos |
| 1950–51 | (Greece) | Stelios Christopoulos (2) | 3 | Olympiacos |
| 1951–52 | Competition not held | | | |
| 1952–53 | Not awarded (8 different scorers) | | | |
| 1953–54 | (Greece) | Christoforos Yientzis | 7 | PAOK |
| 1953–54 | (Greece) | Babis Kotridis | 6 | Olympiacos |
| 1953–54 | (Greece) | Themis Moustaklis | 5 | Olympiacos |
| 1954–55 | (Greece) | Filippos Asimakopoulos | 8 | Panathinaikos |
| 1954–55 | (Greece) | Elias Yfantis | 7 | Olympiacos |
| 1954–55 | (Greece) | Michalis Sofianos | 7 | Panathinaikos |
| 1954–55 | (Greece) | Giorgos Kamaras | 7 | Apollon Athens |
| 1955–56 | (Greece) | Lambis Kouiroukidis | 7 | PAOK |
| 1955–56 | (Greece) | Christos Karaoulanis | 6 | Ethnikos Piraeus |
| 1955–56 | (Greece) | Vangelis Panakis | 5 | Panathinaikos |
| 1955–56 | (Greece) | Giannis Cholevas | 5 | Apollon Athens |
| 1956–57 | (Greece) | Petros Christofidis | 15 | Proodeftiki |
| 1956–57 | (Greece) | Thanasis Saravakos | 11 | Panionios |
| 1956–57 | (Greece) | Elias Yfantis | 10 | Olympiacos |
| 1956–57 | (Greece) | Lakis Sofianos | 10 | Panathinaikos |
| 1957–58 | (Greece) | Kostas Georgopoulos | 15 | Panionios |
| 1957–58 | (Greece) | Kostas Nestoridis | 11 | AEK Athens |
| 1957–58 | (Greece) | Dimitris Theofanis | 11 | Panathinaikos |
| 1958–59 | (Greece) | Kostas Nestoridis | 21 | AEK Athens |
| 1958–59 | (Greece) | Elias Yfantis | 13 | Olympiacos |
| 1958–59 | (Greece) | Thanasis Loukanidis | 9 | Doxa Drama |
Alpha Ethniki era (1959–2006)
| 1959–60 | (Greece) | Kostas Nestoridis (2) | 33 | AEK Athens |
| 1959–60 | (Greece) | Giorgos Kamaras | 19 | Apollon Athens |
| 1959–60 | (Greece) | Elias Yfantis | 16 | Olympiacos |
| 1960–61 | (Greece) | Kostas Nestoridis (3) | 27 | AEK Athens |
| 1960–61 | (Greece) | Andreas Papaemmanouil | 23 | Panathinaikos |
| 1960–61 | (Greece) | Andreas Benardos | 19 | Ethnikos Piraeus |
| 1961–62 | (Greece) | Kostas Nestoridis (4) | 29 | AEK Athens |
| 1961–62 | (Greece) | Giorgos Sideris | 26 | Olympiacos |
| 1961–62 | (Greece) | Giorgos Kamaras | 19 | Apollon Athens |
| 1962–63 | (Greece) | Kostas Nestoridis (5) | 23 | AEK Athens |
| 1962–63 | (Greece) | Vangelis Panakis | 21 | Panathinaikos |
| 1962–63 | (Greece) | Giorgos Sideris | 18 | Olympiacos |
| 1963–64 | (Greece) | Mimis Papaioannou | 29 | AEK Athens |
| 1963–64 | (Greece) | Giorgos Sideris | 26 | Olympiacos |
| 1963–64 | (Greece) | Kostas Papageorgiou | 20 | AEK Athens |
| 1964–65 | (Greece) | Giorgos Sideris | 29 | Olympiacos |
| 1964–65 | (Greece) | Takis Loukanidis | 21 | Panathinaikos |
| 1964–65 | (Greece) | Kostas Nestoridis | 18 | AEK Athens |
| 1965–66 | (Greece) | Mimis Papaioannou (2) | 24 | AEK Athens |
| 1965–66 | (Greece) | Takis Loukanidis | 19 | Panathinaikos |
| 1965–66 | (Greece) | Giorgos Sideris | 19 | Olympiacos |
| 1966–67 | (Greece) | Giorgos Sideris (2) | 24 | Olympiacos |
| 1966–67 | (Greece) | Vasilis Kyriakou | 21 | Apollon Athens |
| 1966–67 | (Greece) | Sakis Kouvas | 15 | Vyzas Megara |
| 1967–68 | (Greece) | Thanasis Intzoglou | 24 | Panionios |
| 1967–68 | (Greece) | Giorgos Sideris | 23 | Olympiacos |
| 1967–68 | (Greece) | Sakis Kouvas | 19 | Vyzas Megara |
| 1968–69 | (Greece) | Giorgos Sideris (3) | 35 | Olympiacos |
| 1968–69 | (Greece) | Giorgos Dedes | 25 | Panionios |
| 1968–69 | (Greece) | Giorgos Koudas | 20 | PAOK |
| 1969–70 | (Greece) | Antonis Antoniadis | 25 | Panathinaikos |
| 1969–70 | (Greece) | Mimis Papaioannou | 18 | AEK Athens |
| 1969–70 | (Greece) | Giorgos Dedes | 17 | Panionios |
| 1970–71 | (Greece) | Giorgos Dedes | 28 | Panionios |
| 1970–71 | (Greece) | Mimis Papaioannou | 27 | AEK Athens |
| 1970–71 | (Greece) | Mimis Domazos | 20 | Panathinaikos |
| 1971–72 | (Greece) | Antonis Antoniadis (2) | 39 | Panathinaikos |
| 1971–72 | (Greece) | Yves Triantafyllos | 19 | Olympiacos |
| 1971–72 | (Greece) | Alexandros Alexiadis | 15 | Aris |
| 1972–73 | (Greece) | Antonis Antoniadis (3) | 22 | Panathinaikos |
| 1972–73 | (Greece) | Stavros Sarafis | 19 | PAOK |
| 1972–73 | (France) | Yves Triantafyllos | 16 | Olympiacos |
| 1973–74 | (Greece) | Antonis Antoniadis (4) | 26 | Panathinaikos |
| 1973–74 | (France) | Yves Triantafyllos | 23 | Olympiacos |
| 1973–74 | (Greece) | Michalis Kritikopoulos | 19 | Olympiacos |
| 1974–75 | (Greece) | Antonis Antoniadis (5) | 20 | Panathinaikos |
| 1974–75 | (Uruguay) | Washington Calcaterra | 20 | Ethnikos Piraeus |
| 1974–75 | (Greece) | Michalis Kritikopoulos | 19 | Olympiacos |
| 1975–76 | (Greece) | Giorgos Dedes (2) | 15 | AEK Athens |
| 1975–76 | (Greece) | Giorgos Koudas | 14 | PAOK |
| 1975–76 | (Greece) | Dinos Ballis | 13 | Aris |
| 1976–77 | (Greece) | Thanasis Intzoglou (2) | 22 | Ethnikos Piraeus |
| 1976–77 | (Greece) | Dimitrios Papadopoulos | 20 | OFI |
| 1976–77 | (Argentina) | Óscar Álvarez | 19 | Panathinaikos |
| 1977–78 | (Greece) | Thomas Mavros | 22 | AEK Athens |
| 1977–78 | (Argentina) | Óscar Álvarez | 18 | Panathinaikos |
| 1977–78 | (Greece) | Achilleas Aslanidis | 15 | Panathinaikos |
| 1977–78 | (Greece) | Takis Nikoloudis | 15 | AEK Athens |
| 1977–78 | (Greece) | Kostas Orfanos | 15 | PAOK |
| 1978–79 | (Greece) | Thomas Mavros (2) | 31 | AEK Athens |
| 1978–79 | (Socialist Federal Republic of Yugoslavia) | Dušan Bajević | 24 | AEK Athens |
| 1978–79 | (Greece) | Manolis Kottis | 24 | Rodos |
| 1979–80 | (Socialist Federal Republic of Yugoslavia) | Dušan Bajević | 25 | AEK Athens |
| 1979–80 | (Greece) | Georgios Kostikos | 16 | PAOK |
| 1979–80 | (Greece) | Thalis Tsirimokos | 16 | PAS Giannina |
| 1980–81 | (Greece) | Dinos Kouis | 21 | Aris |
| 1980–81 | (Greece) | Grigoris Charalampidis | 15 | Doxa Drama |
| 1980–81 | (Greece) | Thomas Liolios | 13 | Kastoria |
| 1981–82 | (Greece) | Grigoris Charalampidis | 21 | Panathinaikos |
| 1981–82 | (Greece) | Giorgos Kostikos | 18 | PAOK |
| 1981–82 | (Greece) | Thomas Mavros | 17 | AEK Athens |
| 1982–83 | (Greece) | Nikos Anastopoulos | 29 | Olympiacos |
| 1982–83 | (Greece) | Thomas Mavros | 19 | AEK Athens |
| 1982–83 | (Greece) | Thalis Tsirimokos | 17 | OFI |
| 1983–84 | (Greece) | Nikos Anastopoulos (2) | 18 | Olympiacos |
| 1983–84 | (Greece) | Grigoris Charalampidis | 17 | Panathinaikos |
| 1983–84 | (Greece) | Thomas Mavros | 13 | AEK Athens |
| 1984–85 | (Greece) | Thomas Mavros (3) | 27 | AEK Athens |
| 1984–85 | (Greece) | Nikos Anastopoulos | 16 | Olympiacos |
| 1984–85 | (Greece) | Dimitris Saravakos | 15 | Panathinaikos |
| 1985–86 | (Greece) | Nikos Anastopoulos (3) | 19 | Olympiacos |
| 1985–86 | (Greece) | Dimitris Saravakos | 15 | Panathinaikos |
| 1985–86 | (Bulgaria) | Todor Barzov | 12 | Panionios |
| 1986–87 | (Greece) | Nikos Anastopoulos (4) | 16 | Olympiacos |
| 1986–87 | (Greece) | Dimitris Saravakos | 13 | Panathinaikos |
| 1986–87 | (Greece) | Giorgos Vlastos | 13 | OFI |
| 1986–87 | (Bulgaria) | Misho Vulchev | 13 | Doxa Drama |
| 1987–88 | (Denmark) | Henrik Nielsen | 21 | AEK Athens |
| 1987–88 | (Greece) | Thomas Mavros | 16 | Panionios |
| 1987–88 | (Greece) | Michalis Ziogas | 16 | AEL |
| 1988–89 | (Hungary) | Imre Boda | 20 | Olympiacos Volos |
| 1988–89 | (Hungary) | Lajos Détári | 15 | Olympiacos |
| 1988–89 | (Greece) | Thanasis Dimopoulos | 13 | Iraklis |
| 1989–90 | (Greece) | Thomas Mavros (4) | 22 | Panionios |
| 1989–90 | (Hungary) | Lajos Détári | 20 | Olympiacos |
| 1989–90 | (Greece) | Michalis Ziogas | 18 | AEL |
| 1990–91 | (Greece) | Dimitris Saravakos | 23 | Panathinaikos |
| 1990–91 | (Poland) | Krzysztof Warzycha | 18 | Panathinaikos |
| 1990–91 | (Greece) | Nikos Anastopoulos | 17 | Olympiacos |
| 1991–92 | (Greece) | Vasilis Dimitriadis | 28 | AEK Athens |
| 1991–92 | (Greece) | Dimitris Saravakos | 24 | Panathinaikos |
| 1991–92 | (Greece) | Panagiotis Tsalouchidis | 15 | Olympiacos |
| 1992–93 | (Greece) | Vasilis Dimitriadis (2) | 33 | AEK Athens |
| 1992–93 | (Poland) | Krzysztof Warzycha | 32 | Panathinaikos |
| 1992–93 | (Brazil) | Veridiano Marcelo | 24 | Xanthi |
| 1993–94 | (Greece) | Alexis Alexandris | 24 | AEK Athens |
| 1993–94 | (Poland) | Krzysztof Warzycha | 24 | Panathinaikos |
| 1993–94 | (Greece) | Fanis Tountziaris | 20 | Iraklis |
| 1994–95 | (Poland) | Krzysztof Warzycha (2) | 29 | Panathinaikos |
| 1994–95 | (Greece) | Dimitris Saravakos | 21 | AEK Athens |
| 1994–95 | (Greece) | Demis Nikolaidis | 17 | Apollon Smyrnis |
| 1995–96 | (Greece) | Vasilios Tsiartas | 26 | AEK Athens |
| 1995–96 | (Greece) | Vassilis Karapialis | 19 | Olympiacos |
| 1995–96 | (Greece) | Christos Kostis | 19 | AEK Athens |
| 1995–96 | (Poland) | Krzysztof Warzycha | 19 | Panathinaikos |
| 1996–97 | (Greece) | Alexis Alexandris (2) | 23 | Olympiacos |
| 1996–97 | (Greece) | Kostas Frantzeskos | 22 | OFI 6, PAOK 16 |
| 1996–97 | (Greece) | Christos Kostis | 21 | AEK Athens |
| 1996–97 | (Poland) | Krzysztof Warzycha | 21 | Panathinaikos |
| 1997–98 | (Poland) | Krzysztof Warzycha (3) | 32 | Panathinaikos |
| 1997–98 | (Federal Republic of Yugoslavia) | Ilija Ivić | 26 | Olympiacos |
| 1997–98 | (Greece) | Georgios Georgiadis | 21 | Panathinaikos |
| 1998–99 | (Greece) | Demis Nikolaidis | 22 | AEK Athens |
| 1998–99 | (Greece) | Nikos Frousos | 18 | Ionikos |
| 1998–99 | (Poland) | Leszek Pisz | 14 | Kavala |
| 1999–00 | (Greece) | Dimitris Nalitzis | 24 | Panionios 13, PAOK 11 |
| 1999–00 | (Greece) | Nikos Liberopoulos | 23 | Panathinaikos |
| 1999–00 | (Cyprus) | Michalis Konstantinou | 22 | Iraklis |
| 1999–00 | (Greece) | Demis Nikolaidis | 22 | AEK Athens |
| 2000–01 | (Greece) | Alexis Alexandris (3) | 20 | Olympiacos |
| 2000–01 | (Cyprus) | Michalis Konstantinou | 19 | Iraklis |
| 2000–01 | (Greece) | Demis Nikolaidis | 15 | AEK Athens |
| 2001–02 | (Greece) | Alexis Alexandris (4) | 19 | Olympiacos |
| 2001–02 | (Greece) | Demis Nikolaidis | 17 | AEK Athens |
| 2001–02 | (Greece) | Vasilios Tsiartas | 16 | AEK Athens |
| 2002–03 | (Greece) | Nikos Liberopoulos | 16 | Panathinaikos |
| 2002–03 | (Greece) | Stelios Giannakopoulos | 15 | Olympiacos |
| 2002–03 | (Greece) | Georgios Georgiadis | 14 | PAOK |
| 2003–04 | (Brazil) | Giovanni | 21 | Olympiacos |
| 2003–04 | (Greece) | Dimitris Papadopoulos | 16 | Panathinaikos |
| 2003–04 | (Greece) | Dimitris Salpingidis | 16 | PAOK |
| 2004–05 | (Greece) | Theofanis Gekas | 18 | Kallithea 10, Panathinaikos 8 |
| 2004–05 | (Brazil) | Luciano | 16 | Xanthi |
| 2004–05 | (Cyprus) | Michalis Konstantinou | 15 | Panathinaikos |
| 2005–06 | (Greece) | Dimitris Salpingidis | 17 | PAOK |
| 2005–06 | (Serbia) | Predrag Đorđević | 15 | Olympiacos |
| 2005–06 | (Greece) | Theofanis Gekas | 15 | Panathinaikos |
| 2005–06 | (Brazil) | Luciano | 15 | Xanthi 5, Panionios 10 |
| 2005–06 | (Cameroon) | Joël Epalle | 15 | Iraklis |
Super League era (2007– present)
| 2006–07 | (Greece) | Nikos Liberopoulos (2) | 18 | AEK Athens |
| 2006–07 | (Brazil) | Rivaldo | 17 | Olympiacos |
| 2006–07 | (Poland) | Marcin Mięciel | 14 | PAOK |
| 2006–07 | (Greece) | Dimitris Salpingidis | 14 | Panathinaikos |
| 2007–08 | (Argentina) | Ismael Blanco | 19 | AEK Athens |
| 2007–08 | (Serbia) | Darko Kovačević | 17 | Olympiacos |
| 2007–08 | (Greece) | Dimitris Salpingidis | 15 | Panathinaikos |
| 2008–09 | (Argentina) | Ismael Blanco (2) | 14 | AEK Athens |
| 2008–09 | (Argentina) | Luciano Galletti | 14 | Olympiacos |
| 2008–09 | (Greece) | Dimitris Salpingidis | 10 | Panathinaikos |
| 2009–10 | (France) | Djibril Cissé | 23 | Panathinaikos |
| 2009–10 | (Greece) | Giorgos Barkoglou | 11 | Levadiakos |
| 2009–10 | (Argentina) | Javier Cámpora | 11 | Aris |
| 2009–10 | (Romania) | Victoraș Iacob | 11 | Iraklis |
| 2010–11 | (France) | Djibril Cissé (2) | 20 | Panathinaikos |
| 2010–11 | (Belgium) | Kevin Mirallas | 14 | Olympiacos |
| 2010–11 | (Algeria) | Rafik Djebbour | 12 | AEK Athens 5, Olympiacos 7 |
| 2011–12 | (Belgium) | Kevin Mirallas | 20 | Olympiacos |
| 2011–12 | (Greece) | Kostas Mitroglou | 16 | Atromitos |
| 2011–12 | (Argentina) | Sebastián Leto | 15 | Panathinaikos |
| 2012–13 | (Algeria) | Rafik Djebbour | 20 | Olympiacos |
| 2012–13 | (Greece) | Stefanos Athanasiadis | 13 | PAOK |
| 2012–13 | (Greece) | Dimitrios Papadopoulos | 11 | Panthrakikos |
| 2012–13 | (Greece) | Kostas Mitroglou | 11 | Olympiacos |
| 2013–14 | (Argentina) | Esteban Solari | 16 | Xanthi |
| 2013–14 | (Sweden) | Marcus Berg | 15 | Panathinaikos |
| 2013–14 | (Comoros) | El Fardou Ben Nabouhane | 15 | Veria |
| 2014–15 | (Argentina) | Jerónimo Barrales | 17 | Asteras Tripolis |
| 2014–15 | (Greece) | Kostas Mitroglou | 16 | Olympiacos |
| 2014–15 | (Argentina) | Alejandro Domínguez | 15 | Olympiacos |
| 2015–16 | (Greece) | Kostas Fortounis | 18 | Olympiacos |
| 2015–16 | (Sweden) | Marcus Berg | 15 | Panathinaikos |
| 2015–16 | (Australia) | Apostolos Giannou | 13 | Asteras Tripolis |
| 2016–17 | (Sweden) | Marcus Berg | 22 | Panathinaikos |
| 2016–17 | (Tunisia) | Hamza Younés | 19 | Xanthi |
| 2016–17 | (Nigeria) | Brown Ideye | 13 | Olympiacos |
| 2016–17 | (Spain) | Pedro Conde | 13 | PAS Giannina |
| 2017–18 | (Serbia) | Aleksandar Prijović | 19 | PAOK |
| 2017–18 | (Iran) | Karim Ansarifard | 17 | Olympiacos |
| 2017–18 | (Spain) | Pedro Conde | 14 | PAS Giannina |
| 2018–19 | (Greece) | Efthymis Koulouris | 19 | Atromitos |
| 2018–19 | (Argentina) | Ezequiel Ponce | 16 | AEK Athens |
| 2018–19 | (Greece) | Kostas Fortounis | 12 | Olympiacos |
| 2019–20 | (Morocco) | Youssef El-Arabi | 20 | Olympiacos |
| 2019–20 | (Portugal) | Nelson Oliveira | 14 | AEK Athens |
| 2019–20 | (Italy) | Federico Macheda | 14 | Panathinaikos |
| 2019–20 | (Greece) | Giorgos Manousos | 14 | Atromitos |
| 2020–21 | (Morocco) | Youssef El-Arabi (2) | 22 | Olympiacos |
| 2020–21 | (Greece) | Georgios Masouras | 13 | Olympiacos |
| 2020–21 | (Iran) | Karim Ansarifard | 13 | AEK Athens |
| 2021–22 | (Netherlands) | Tom van Weert | 17 | Volos |
| 2021–22 | (Morocco) | Youssef El-Arabi | 16 | Olympiacos |
| 2021–22 | (Slovenia) | Jasmin Kurtić | 15 | PAOK |
| 2022–23 | (Democratic Republic of the Congo) | Cédric Bakambu | 18 | Olympiacos |
| 2022–23 | (Trinidad and Tobago) | Levi García | 14 | AEK Athens |
| 2022–23 | (Greece) | Nikos Karelis | 13 | Panetolikos |
| 2023–24 | (Spain) | Loren Morón | 20 | Aris |
| 2023–24 | (Morocco) | Ayoub El Kaabi | 17 | Olympiacos |
| 2023–24 | (Serbia) | Ognjen Ožegović | 16 | A.E. Kifisia |
| 2024–25 | (Spain) | Jefté Betancor | 19 | Panserraikos |
| 2024–25 | (Morocco) | Ayoub El Kaabi | 18 | Olympiacos |
| 2024–25 | (Spain) | Loren Morón | 18 | Aris |
| 2025–26 | (Morocco) | Ayoub El Kaabi | 18 | Olympiacos |
| 2025–26 | (Serbia) | Luka Jović | 17 | AEK Athens |
| 2025–26 | (Argentina) | Fabricio Pedrozo | 13 | Levadiakos |

Note: Goals in play-off matches before the 2019–20 season are not included:
- Mimis Papaioannou: 2 (AEK Athens, 1962–63)
- Kostas Nestoridis: 1 (AEK Athens, 1962–63)
- Nikos Anastopoulos: 1 (Olympiacos, 1982–83)
- Dimitris Saravakos: 3 (Panionios, 1982–83 and 1983–84)
- Michalis Kritikopoulos: 2 (Panaigialios, 1964–65 and 1965–66)
- Dimitris Salpingidis: 11 (PAOK 9, Panathinaikos 2)
- Nikos Liberopoulos: 5 (AEK Athens)

== By club ==
| Team | Won | Players | Scorer(s) |
|---|---|---|---|
| Olympiacos | 29 | Vazos (4), Anastopoulos (4), Sideris (3), Alexandris (3), El-Arabi (2), Simeonidis (2), Christopoulos (2), Darivas (1), Bebis (1), Giovanni (1), Galletti (1), Mirallas (1), Djebbour (1), Fortounis (1), Bakambu (1), El Kaabi (1) | 16 |
| AEK Athens | 23 | Nestoridis (5), Mavros (3), Papaioannou (2), Dimitriadis (2), Blanco (2), Vasiliou (1), Maropoulos (1), Dedes (1), Bajevic (1), Nielsen (1), Alexandris (1), Tsiartas (1), Nikolaidis (1), Liberopoulos (1) | 14 |
| Panathinaikos | 18 | Antoniadis (5), Warzycha (3), Cissé (2), Messaris (1), Kritikos (1), Asimakopoulos (1), Charalampidis (1), Saravakos (1), Liberopoulos (1), Gekas (1 half season), Berg (1) | 11 |
| Aris | 7 | Kitsos (2) Angelakis (1), Kleanthis (1), Grigoriadis (1), Kouis (1), Morón (1) | 6 |
| PAOK | 6 | Kalogiannis (1), Yientzis (1), Kouiroukidis (1), Nalitzis (1 half season), Salpingidis (1), Prijiovic (1) | 6 |
| Panionios | 5 | Georgopoulos (1), Mavros (1), Nalitzis (1 half season), Intzoglou (1), Dedes (1) | 5 |
| Ethnikos Piraeus | 3 | Choumis (1), Intzoglou (1), Calcaterra (1) | 3 |
| Olympiacos Volos | 1 | Boda (1) | 1 |
| Proodeftiki | 1 | Christofidis (1) | 1 |
| Kallithea | 1 | Gekas (1 half season) | 1 |
| Xanthi | 1 | Solari (1) | 1 |
| Asteras Tripolis | 1 | Barales (1) | 1 |
| Atromitos | 1 | Koulouris (1) | 1 |
| Volos | 1 | Van Weert (1) | 1 |
| Panserraikos | 1 | Betancor (1) | 1 |

== By nationality ==
| Nat. | Won | Players | Scorer(s) |
|---|---|---|---|
| Greece | 70 | Nestoridis (5), Antoniadis (5), Anastopoulos (4), Vazos (4), Mavros (4), Alexandris (4), Sideris (3), Kitsos (2), Simeonidis (2), Christopoulos (2), Papaioannou (2), Intzoglou (2), Dedes (2), Dimitriadis (2), Liberopoulos (2), Angelakis (1), Messaris (1), Choumis (1), Kritikos (1), Kalogiannis (1), Maropoulos (1), Vikelidis (1), Grigoriadis (1), Yientzis (1), Darivas (1), Bebis (1), Asimakopoulos (1), Kouikouridis (1), Christofidis (1), Georgopoulos (1), Kouis (1), Charalambidis (1), Saravakos (1), Tsiartas (1), Nikolaidis (1), Nalitzis (1), Gekas (1), Salpingidis (1), Fortounis (1), Koulouris (1) | 41 |
| Argentina | 5 | Blanco (2), Galletti (1), Barrales (1), Solari (1) | 4 |
| Poland | 3 | Warzycha (3) | 1 |
| Morocco | 3 | El-Arabi (2), El Kaabi (1) | 2 |
| Spain | 2 | Morón (1), Betancor (1) | 2 |
| France | 2 | Cissé (2) | 1 |
| Cyprus | 1 | Vasiliou (1) | 1 |
| Algeria | 1 | Djebbour (1) | 1 |
| Uruguay | 1 | Calcaterra (1) | 1 |
| Bosnia and Herzegovina | 1 | Bajević (1) | 1 |
| Denmark | 1 | Nielsen (1) | 1 |
| Hungary | 1 | Boda (1) | 1 |
| Brazil | 1 | Giovanni (1) | 1 |
| Belgium | 1 | Mirallas (1) | 1 |
| Sweden | 1 | Berg (1) | 1 |
| Serbia | 1 | Prijović (1) | 1 |
| Netherlands | 1 | Van Weert (1) | 1 |
| Democratic Republic of the Congo | 1 | Bakambu (1) | 1 |

== All-time top scorers ==
Key

- **Bold** shows players still playing in Super League 1.
- Italics show players still playing professional football in other leagues.

As of matches played on 21 August 2022

| Rank | Player | Goals | Apps | Ratio | First | Last | Club(s) (goals/apps) | Notes |
|---|---|---|---|---|---|---|---|---|
| 1 | (Greece) Thomas Mavros | 260 | 502 | 0.52 | 1970 | 1991 | Panionios (86/224), AEK Athens (174/278) | |
| 2 | (Poland) Krzysztof Warzycha | 244 | 390 | 0.63 | 1989 | 2004 | Panathinaikos | |
| 3 | (Greece) Mimis Papaioannou | 234 | 480 | 0.49 | 1962 | 1979 | AEK Athens | |
| 4 | (Greece) Giorgos Sideris | 224 | 285 | 0.79 | 1959 | 1972 | Olympiacos | |
| 5 | (Greece) Antonis Antoniadis | 187 | 241 | 0.78 | 1968 | 1982 | Panathinaikos (180/228), Olympiacos (7/13) | |
| 5 | (Greece) Alexis Alexandris | 187 | 387 | 0.48 | 1986 | 2005 | Veria (7/43), AEK Athens (49/89), Olympiacos (127/242), Kallithea (4/13) | |
| 7 | (Greece) Nikos Anastopoulos | 182 | 408 | 0.45 | 1976 | 1994 | Panionios (30/128), Olympiacos (145/261), Ionikos (7/19) | |
| 7 | (Greece) Georgios Dedes | 182 | 430 | 0.42 | 1961 | 1978 | Panionios (152/366), AEK Athens (30/64) | |
| 8 | (Greece) Dimitris Saravakos | 181 | 443 | 0.41 | 1977 | 1998 | Panionios (35/142), Panathinaikos (125/254), AEK Athens (21/47) | |
| 10 | (Greece) Michalis Kritikopoulos | 177 | 428 | 0.41 | 1963 | 1981 | Panegialios (11/30), Ethnikos Piraeus (79/185), Olympiacos (83/187), Apollon Smyrnis (4/26) | |
| 11 | (Greece) Kostas Nestoridis | 172 | 213 | 0.81 | 1951 | 1968 | Panionios (0/3), AEK Athens (172/208), Vyzas (0/2) | |
| 12 | (Greece) Nikos Liberopoulos | 164 | 403 | 0.41 | 1995 | 2012 | Kalamata (11/30), Panathinaikos (72/186), AEK Athens (81/187) | |
| 13 | (Greece) Demis Nikolaidis | 163 | 269 | 0.61 | 1993 | 2003 | Apollon Smyrnis (38/80), AEK Athens (125/189) | |
| 14 | (Greece) Dinos Kouis | 142 | 473 | 0.3 | 1974 | 1991 | Aris | |
| 15 | (Greece) Mimis Domazos | 139 | 536 | 0.26 | 1959 | 1980 | Panathinaikos (134/502), AEK Athens (5/34) | |
| 16 | (Greece) Georgios Georgiadis | 137 | 476 | 0.29 | 1990 | 2008 | Doxa Drama (17/77), Panathinaikos (60/176), PAOK (45/143), Olympiacos (9/44), Iraklis (6/36) | |
| 17 | (Greece) Stavros Sarafis | 136 | 358 | 0.38 | 1967 | 1981 | PAOK | |
| 17 | (Greece) Dimitris Salpingidis | 136 | 381 | 0.36 | 2002 | 2015 | PAOK (90/262), Panathinaikos (46/119) | |
| 19 | (Greece) Giorgos Koudas | 134 | 504 | 0.27 | 1963 | 1984 | PAOK | |
| 20 | (Greece) Alekos Alexiadis | 132 | 329 | 0.4 | 1963 | 1977 | Aris (127/301), Panetolikos (3/20), Kastoria (2/8) | |
| 21 | (Greece) Thanasis Intzoglou | 129 | | | 1962 | 1978 | Panionios, Ethnikos Piraeus (28/43) | |
| 22 | (Serbia) Predrag Djordjevic | 128 | 374 | 0.34 | 1995 | 2009 | Paniliakos (2/31), Olympiacos (126/343) | |
| 23 | (Greece) Vasilis Dimitriadis | 127 | 292 | 0.43 | 1986 | 1997 | Aris (46/138), AEK Athens (81/154) | |
| 24 | (Greece) Kostas Frantzeskos | 118 | 358 | 0.33 | 1990 | 2005 | Panathinaikos (26/98), OFI (31/73), PAOK (45/107), Kalamata (8/27), Ionikos (2/12), Aris (1/15), Proodeftiki (5/26) | |
| 25 | (Greece) Michalis Konstantinou | 109 | 268 | 0.41 | 1997 | 2009 | Iraklis (64/132), Panathinaikos (34/94), Olympiacos (11/42) | |
| 26 | (Greece) Christos Dimopoulos | 108 | 284 | 0.38 | 1980 | 1993 | PAOK (47/112), Panathinaikos (40/112), Athinaikos (21/60) | |
| 26 | (Greece) Georgios Skartados | 108 | 478 | 0.23 | 1978 | 1997 | Rodos (5/87), PAOK (84/265), Iraklis (16/94), Olympiacos (3/32) | |
| 28 | (Greece) Takis Hatziioannoglou | 102 | | | 1960 | 1976 | Ethnikos Piraeus | |
| 28 | (Greece) Nikos Gioutsos | 102 | 319 | 0.32 | 1964 | 1976 | Olympiacos (100/276), Ethnikos Piraeus (2/43) | |
| 28 | (Greece) Georgios Kostikos | 102 | 323 | 0.32 | 1975 | 1988 | Pierikos (13/51), PAOK (78/233), Olympiacos (5/20), Diagoras (6/19) | |
| 31 | (Greece) Kostas Nikolaidis | 100 | 247 | 0.4 | 1965 | 1976 | AEK Athens (94/224), Apollon Smyrnis (6/23) | |

== Records ==
- Thomas Mavros is the all-time top goalscorer having scored a record 260 goals.
- Antonis Antoniadis has the record of most goals in one season having scored 39 goals in 1971–72 season.
- Kostas Nestoridis and Antonis Antoniadis are the only players who have won the top goalscorer award in a record of 5 times each.
- Kostas Nestoridis is also the only player who has won the top goalscorer award 5 consecutive times.
- Thomas Mavros is the youngest player to have scored a goal (16 years, 8 months and 17 days old). He scored the only goal in the 1–0 home win of Panionios over Pierikos on 17 February 1971.
