= 1928–29 Panhellenic Championship =

Abandoned season of top-tier football league in Greece

Panhellenic Championship
- Season: 1928–29
- Champions: none
- Relegated: none

The 1928–29 Panhellenic Championship was not held due to serious financial problems, as the organization of friendly matches between the POK members had led the HFF to economic and competitive decline. The return of the members of POK to the HFF in July 1928 and the desire of both sides to hold the championship did not succeed, as the championships of Athens, Piraeus and Macedonia were held, in which Panathinaikos, Olympiacos alongside Ethnikos Piraeus and Aris finished first, respectively. However, since their completion eventually held until the summer, the Panhellenic Championship did not take place in fear of another financial failure.

== Qualification round ==
=== Athens Football Clubs Association ===
Pos	Team	Pld	W	D	L	GF	GA	GR	Pts	PAO	AEK	ATR	APOL	ATH	GDI
1	Panathinaikos (Q)	9	9	0	0	41	3	13.667	18		— (Note: The match did not take place, as the title was essentially judged according to the criteria goal ratio, which was then applied in cases of equality (AEK needed to win the game with 10–0 or an 11–goal difference). As a result, both clubs played a game less.)	4–0	10–0	4–0	12–0
2	AEK Athens	9	6	2	1	19	9	2.111	14	2–4		3–0	4–1	3–1	2–0 (Note: Goudi withdrew at the second round of the tournament, having played only 5 matches. Thus the rest of their matches were awarded by 2–0.)
3	Atromitos	10	4	2	4	10	13	0.769	10	0–3	0–0		2–0	3–1	1–0
4	Apollon Athens	10	4	1	5	15	24	0.625	9	0–1	0–1	2–0		3–2	4–1
5	Athinaikos	10	2	3	5	19	24	0.792	7	1–3	2–2	2–2	3–3		5–1
6	Goudi Athens	10	0	0	10	3	34	0.088	0	0–2	1–2	0–2	0–2	0–2	

Source: Athletic Echo
(Q) Qualified for the phase indicated

==== Top scorers ====
Rank	Player	Club	Goals
1	(Greece) Antonis Tsolinas	Panathinaikos	8
2	(Greece) Kostas Negrepontis	AEK Athens	6
3	(Greece) Karakasis	Apollon Athens	5
3	(Greece) S. Kagelaris	Athinaikos	4
3	(Greece) Angelos Messaris	Panathinaikos	4
3	(Greece) Antonis Tziralidis	Panathinaikos	4
7	(Armenia) Zareh Minasyan	Athinaikos	3
8	(Greece) Robert Mallios Galić	AEK Athens	2
8	(Greece) Kostas Negris	AEK Athens	2
10	(Greece) Argyris Argyriadis	Athinaikos	1
10	(Greece) Koulopoulos	Athinaikos	1
10	(Greece) N. Panopoulos	Athinaikos	1
10	(Greece) K. Terzakis	Athinaikos	1
10	(Greece) Ilias Iliaskos	AEK Athens	1
10	(Greece) Delikaris	AEK Athens	1
10	(Greece) Th. Marsellos	Apollon Athens	1
10	(Greece) Charalampos Mavrommatis	Apollon Athens	1
10	(Greece) Papadimitriou	Apollon Athens	1
10	(Greece) Antonis Migiakis	Panathinaikos	1
10	(Greece) Dimosthenis Bogdanos	Panathinaikos	1
10	(Greece) Mimis Pierrakos	Panathinaikos	1
10	(Greece) Rigopoulos	Atromitos	1

=== Piraeus Football Clubs Association ===
Pos	Team	Pld	W	D	L	GF	GA	GD	Pts	ETH	OLY	AMY
1	Ethnikos Piraeus (Note: In the ranking matches, both of them achieved a victory and as stipulated by the HFF legislation, 2 play-off matches were re-defined. The 3rd match ended a draw and a 4th match was held in the summer on 14 July 1929 and if it ended in a draw it would be led to extra time. The game was suspended at the 87th minute because of fan invasion, while the score was 1–1. Eventually, the Piraeus' Association declared both clubs co-champions in order not to repeat the incidents of the previous periods, with the departures of any of them.) (Q)	4	3	0	1	10	5	+5	6		1–0	3–0
2	Olympiacos (Q)	4	3	0	1	10	6	+4	6	4–3		2–0
3	Amyna Kokkinia	4	0	0	4	3	12	−9	0	1–3	2–4	

Source: Athletic Echo
(Q) Qualified for the phase indicated
Notes:

Championship play-offs
Team 1	Agg.	Team 2	1st leg	2nd leg	3rd leg	4th leg
Olympiacos	8–8	Ethnikos Piraeus	2–0	2–4	3–3	1–1*

26 May 1929

Olympiacos	2–0	Ethnikos Piraeus
Dendinellis 32'; Violetis 81'	Report

Velodrome, Piraeus
9 June 1929

Ethnikos Piraeus	4–2	Olympiacos
Ferlemis 24', 49' (pen.); Papagiannopoulos 27', 64'	Report	G. Andrianopoulos 9'; V. Andrianopoulos 77' (pen.)

Leoforos Alexandras Stadium, Ampelokipoi
16 June 1929
17:30 EET

Olympiacos	3–3	Ethnikos Piraeus
G. Andrianopoulos 12', 46'; D. Andrianopoulos 36' (pen.)	Report	Tsiritakis 56'; Papagiannopoulos 76'; Ferlemis 85'

Leoforos Alexandras Stadium, Ampelokipoi
Attendance: 7,000
Referee: Venteroulis (Thessaloniki)
14 July 1929
18:00 EET

Olympiacos	1–1	Ethnikos Piraeus
V. Andrianopoulos 25'	Report	Petroutsos

Leoforos Alexandras Stadium, Ampelokipoi
Referee: D. Iliadis (Thessaloniki)

Ethnikos scored a second goal at the 80th minute, but after the collision of the goalkeeper of Olympiacos with 3 players of Ethnikos after he had previously blocked the ball, thus the goal was canceled as a foul. The game continued until a fan invaded the pitch and attacked a footballer of Olympiacos that caused a general conflict, as other fans invaded as well and eventually the match was suspended.

==== Top scorers ====
Rank	Player	Club	Goals
1	(Greece) Vasilios Andrianopoulos	Olympiacos	8
2	(Greece) Dinos Andrianopoulos	Olympiacos	2
2	(Greece) P. Ferlemis	Ethnikos Piraeus	2
2	(Greece) Papagiannopoulos	Ethnikos Piraeus	2
5	(Greece) Giannis Andrianopoulos	Olympiacos	1
5	(Greece) Ioannidis	Ethnikos Piraeus	1
5	(Greece) Servos	Ethnikos Piraeus	1
5	(Greece) Strizonis	Ethnikos Piraeus	1
5	(Greece) Fragakis	Ethnikos Piraeus	1
5	(Greece) I. Vasileiou	Amyna Piraeus	1

=== Macedonia Football Clubs Association ===
Pos	Team	Pld	W	D	L	GF	GA	GD	Pts	ARIS	PAOK	IRA	MEG	THER	ATL
1	Aris (Q)	10	8	2	0	40	13	+27	18		1–1	2–1	11–2	5–2	2–0
2	PAOK	10	8	2	0	32	8	+24	18	3–3		3–0	3–0	7–1	3–0
3	Iraklis	10	4	1	5	25	22	+3	9	1–4	0–3		6–2	0–2 (Note: The initial 4–1 was canceled after an objection from Thermaikos. Awarded 0–2 to Thermaikos.)	5–2
4	Megas Alexandros	10	3	2	5	17	34	−17	8	1–6	0–1	1–1		2–2	4–1
5	Thermaikos	10	3	1	6	20	29	−9	7	2–3	0–2	1–4	2–3		4–1
6	Atlantas	10	0	0	10	12	40	−28	0	0–3	3–6	2–7	1–2	2–4	

Source: rsssf
(Q) Qualified for the phase indicated
Notes:

Final
Team 1	Agg.	Team 2	1st leg	2nd leg
PAOK	4–5	Aris	1–1	3–4

==== Matches ====
12 May 1929

PAOK	1–1	Aris
Ettien 42'		Kaltekis 72'

Iraklis Stadium, Thessaloniki
2 June 1929

Aris	4–3	PAOK
Angelakis 25', 46', 60'; Leontariadis 51'		Tsolakidis 10'; Makaronopoulos 15'; Ettien 72'

Iraklis Stadium, Thessaloniki
Referee: Charda

Aris won 5–4 on aggregate.

==== Top scorers ====
Rank	Player	Club	Goals
1	(Greece) Nikolaos Angelakis	Aris	8
2	(Greece) Christos Leontaridis	Aris	5
2	(Greece) Ch. Batzoglou	Iraklis	5
4	(France) Raymond Étienne	PAOK	4
4	(Greece) Makaranopoulos	PAOK	4
4	(Greece) Christoforos Pantermalis	PAOK	4
4	(Greece) Nachmias	Iraklis	4
8	(Greece) Ch. Vorgias	Iraklis	3
8	(Greece) Kolonaris	Aris	3
8	(Greece) Sankionis	Thermaikos	3
11	(Greece) Athanasiou	Iraklis	2
11	(Greece) Vlachos	PAOK	2
11	(Greece) Kousopoulos	Atlantas	2
11	(Greece) Tzitzifas	Aris	2

== Final round ==
Not played.

== See also ==
- P.O.K.
