= 1930–31 Panhellenic Championship =

3rd season of top-tier football league in Greece

Panhellenic Championship
- Season: 1930–31
- Champions: Olympiacos; 1st Greek title
- Relegated: none
- Matches: 49
- Goals: 202 (4.12 per match)
- Top goalscorer: Nikos Kitsos (13 goals)
- Biggest home win: Iraklis 8–1 AEK Athens
- Biggest away win: Iraklis 0–4 Olympiacos; Apollon Athens 0–4 Panathinaikos
- Highest scoring: Iraklis 8–1 AEK Athens
- Longest unbeaten run: Olympiacos

The 1930–31 Panhellenic Championship was the third season of the highest football league of Greece. Olympiacos emerged champion for the 1st time in its history. Apollon Athens, Ethnikos Piraeus and Iraklis qualified for the relegation play-offs for the Athenian, Piraeus' and Macedonian Association, respectively. All three prevailed over their opponents and remained in the national division.

The tournament was held as a national division, in which 8 teams from the 3 founding Associations of the HFF, participated and resulted as follows:

- Athenian Championship: The 3 highest-ranked teams.
- Piraeus' Championship: The 2 highest-ranked teams.
- Macedonian Championship: The 3 highest-ranked teams.

These teams did not participate in the regional championships and their stay in the national division was judged by a play-off round. According to the regulations of the time, whoever finished in a lower position than the other teams of the same Association had to play a two-legged round against the winner of the corresponding regional championship to decide who will qualify for the next season's Panhellenic Championship.

The point system was: Win: 2 points - Draw: 1 point - Loss: 0 points.

== Qualification round ==
=== Athens Football Clubs Association ===
| Pos | Team | Pld | W | D | L | GF | GA | GD | Pts | Qualification | PAO | AEK | APOL | GDI | FAL | ATH | ATR |
|---|---|---|---|---|---|---|---|---|---|---|---|---|---|---|---|---|---|
| 1 | Panathinaikos (Q) | 6 | 6 | 0 | 0 | 37 | 3 | +34 | 12 | Final round | | 2–1 | 2–1 | 8–1 | 9–0 | 10–0 | 6–0 |
| 2 | AEK Athens (Q) | 6 | 5 | 0 | 1 | 17 | 3 | +14 | 10 | Final round | — | | — | — | 2–0 | 3–0 | 7–0 |
| 3 | Apollon Athens (Q) | 6 | 3 | 1 | 2 | 8 | 4 | +4 | 7 | Final round | — | 0–1 | | 0–0 | 1–0 | 3–0 | 3–1 |
| 4 | Goudi Athens | 4 | 1 | 1 | 2 | 5 | 11 | −6 | 3 | | — | 1–3 | — | | — (Note: Did not take place.) | — | 3–0 |
| 5 | Palaio Faliro | 5 | 1 | 1 | 3 | 4 | 14 | −10 | 3 | | — | — | — | — | | 2–2 | 2–0 |
| 6 | Athinaikos | 4 | 0 | 1 | 3 | 2 | 18 | −16 | 1 | | — | — | — | — | — | | — (Note: Suspended at the 70th minute due to rainfall, while the match was at 1–1.) |
| 7 | Atromitos | 5 | 0 | 0 | 5 | 1 | 21 | −20 | 0 | | — | — | — | — | — | — | |

Source: rsssf
(Q) Qualified for the phase indicated
Notes:
- It was held in a group in the form of a one-round tournament (6 matches), but the championship was considered to have ended despite the fact that some clubs had not completed their matches.

==== Top scorers ====
| Rank | Player | Club | Goals |
|---|---|---|---|
| 1 | (Greece) Angelos Messaris | Panathinaikos | 13 |
| 2 | (Greece) Dimitris Mougras | AEK Athens | 8 |
| 3 | (Greece) Antonis Migiakis | Panathinaikos | 6 |
| 3 | (Greece) Diomidis Symeonidis | Panathinaikos | 6 |
| 5 | (Greece) Antonis Tsolinas | Panathinaikos | 5 |
| 6 | (Greece) Mimis Pierrakos | Panathinaikos | 4 |
| 7 | (Greece) Papadimitriou | Apollon Athens | 3 |
| 7 | (Greece) Giorgos Delikaris | AEK Athens | 3 |
| 9 | (Greece) Theofylaktos Delikaris | AEK Athens | 2 |
| 9 | (Greece) Kostas Negrepontis | AEK Athens | 2 |
| 9 | (Greece) Kosmadopoulos | Apollon Athens | 2 |
| 9 | (Greece) Charalampos Mavrommatis | Apollon Athens | 2 |
| 9 | (Greece) Kostas Negris | Goudi Athens | 2 |

=== Piraeus Football Clubs Association ===
The championship started initially with 4 clubs, until Olympiacos and Ethnikos Piraeus left and joined the national division. Then, the championship continued with the 2 remaining clubs.

In the first 2 matches between them for the championship, the matches ended in a draw with 1–1 and 3–3 respectively. A double final was held at Neo Phaliron Velodrome to decide the champion. In the 1st match of the final held on March 29, Amyna Kokkinia prevailed by 4–1 and in the 2nd match on April 5, won again by 2–1 and officially became champion. The standings until the departure of Olympiacos and Ethnikos Piraeus were as follows:

| Pos | Team | Pld | W | D | L | GF | GA | GD | Pts | Qualification | OLY | AMY | PEI | ETH |
|---|---|---|---|---|---|---|---|---|---|---|---|---|---|---|
| 1 | Olympiacos (Q) | 3 | 3 | 0 | 0 | 8 | 1 | +7 | 6 | Final round | | 5–0 | 2–1 | 1–0 |
| 2 | Amyna Kokkinia | 3 | 1 | 1 | 1 | 7 | 8 | −1 | 3 | | — | | 4–0 | — |
| 3 | Peiraikos Omilos | 3 | 0 | 1 | 2 | 4 | 9 | −5 | 1 | | — | 3–3 | | — |
| 4 | Ethnikos Piraeus (Q) | 1 | 0 | 0 | 1 | 0 | 1 | −1 | 0 | Final round | — | — | — | |

Source: Athletic Echo
(Q) Qualified for the phase indicated

==== Top scorers ====
| Rank | Player | Club | Goals |
|---|---|---|---|
| 1 | (Greece) Dinos Andrianopoulos | Olympiacos | 3 |
| 1 | (Greece) Theologos Symeonidis | Amyna Kokkinia | 3 |
| 3 | (Greece) Vasilios Andrianopoulos | Olympiacos | 2 |
| 3 | (Greece) Christoforos Ragos | Olympiacos | 2 |
| 4 | (Greece) Panagiotis Koronaios | Olympiacos | 1 |
| 4 | (Greece) Varoutsikos | Peiraikos Omilos | 1 |
| 4 | (Greece) Theodorou | Peiraikos Omilos | 1 |
| 4 | (Greece) Karageorgas | Peiraikos Omilos | 1 |
| 4 | (Greece) Kouros | Peiraikos Omilos | 1 |

=== Macedonia Football Clubs Association ===
The championship started with the participation of 6 clubs, but was interrupted in December 1930 after the draw of the national division, where Aris, PAOK and Iraklis would participate. The remaining 3 clubs, however, continued in a mini championship in which Megas Alexandros prevailed.

| Pos | Team | Pld | W | D | L | GF | GA | GD | Pts | Qualification | ARIS | PAOK | MEG | MAK | THER | IRA |
|---|---|---|---|---|---|---|---|---|---|---|---|---|---|---|---|---|
| 1 | Aris (Q) | 4 | 4 | 0 | 0 | 27 | 6 | +21 | 8 | Final round | | 6–2 | 5–0 | — | 6–2 | — |
| 2 | PAOK (Q) | 5 | 4 | 0 | 1 | 19 | 12 | +7 | 8 | Final round | — | | 5–1 | 4–3 | 4–0 | — |
| 3 | Megas Alexandros | 5 | 2 | 0 | 3 | 8 | 16 | −8 | 4 | | — | — | | 3–2 | — | 2–0 |
| 4 | Makedonikos | 5 | 1 | 1 | 3 | 10 | 19 | −9 | 3 | | 2–10 | — | — | | 2–1 | — |
| 5 | Thermaikos | 4 | 1 | 0 | 3 | 7 | 14 | −7 | 2 | | — | — | 4–2 | — | | — |
| 6 | Iraklis (Q) | 3 | 0 | 1 | 2 | 3 | 7 | −4 | 1 | Final round | — | 2–4 | — | 1–1 | — | |

Source: Athletic Echo
(Q) Qualified for the phase indicated

==== Top scorers ====
| Rank | Player | Club | Goals |
|---|---|---|---|
| 1 | (Greece) Nikos Kitsos | Aris | 8 |
| 2 | (Greece) Nikolaos Angelakis | Aris | 6 |
| 2 | (Greece) Vasilis Pazarolgou | PAOK | 6 |
| 4 | (Greece) Dionysis Kaltekis | Aris | 5 |
| 5 | (Greece) Iordanis Vogdanou | Aris | 3 |
| 5 | (France) Raymond Étienne | PAOK | 3 |
| 5 | (Greece) Doutse | Makedonikos | 3 |
| 8 | (Greece) Pechlivanidis | Makedonikos | 2 |
| 8 | (Greece) Romylos Vlachou | PAOK | 2 |
| 8 | (Greece) Iordanis Papaiordanidis | PAOK | 2 |
| 8 | (Greece) Venetis | Thermaikos | 2 |
| 8 | (Greece) Kerasiotis | Megas Alexandros | 2 |

== Final round ==
=== League table ===
| Pos | Team | Pld | W | D | L | GF | GA | GD | Pts | Qualification or relegation |
|---|---|---|---|---|---|---|---|---|---|---|
| 1 | Olympiacos (C) | 14 | 11 | 2 | 1 | 36 | 16 | +20 | 24 | 1931–32 Panhellenic Championship |
| 2 | Panathinaikos | 14 | 7 | 5 | 2 | 42 | 25 | +17 | 19 | 1931–32 Panhellenic Championship |
| 3 | Aris | 14 | 8 | 3 | 3 | 35 | 23 | +12 | 19 | 1931–32 Panhellenic Championship |
| 4 | AEK Athens | 14 | 5 | 3 | 6 | 19 | 31 | −12 | 13 | 1931–32 Panhellenic Championship |
| 5 | PAOK | 14 | 5 | 2 | 7 | 20 | 26 | −6 | 12 | 1931–32 Panhellenic Championship |
| 6 | Iraklis | 14 | 4 | 3 | 7 | 25 | 30 | −5 | 11 | Relegation play-offs |
| 7 | Ethnikos Piraeus | 14 | 2 | 3 | 9 | 13 | 25 | −12 | 7 | Relegation play-offs |
| 8 | Apollon Athens | 14 | 2 | 3 | 9 | 12 | 26 | −14 | 7 | Relegation play-offs |

Source: rsssf
(C) Champions

=== Results ===
| Home \ Away | OLY | PAO | ARIS | AEK | PAOK | IRA | ETH | APOL |
|---|---|---|---|---|---|---|---|---|
| Olympiacos | | 3–1 | 3–1 | 3–1 | 3–1 | 3–1 | 4–1 | 3–1 |
| Panathinaikos | 2–3 | | 4–4 | 4–2 (Note: At the 75th minute AEK withdrew from the pitch, as a protest for a violent tackle of Pierrakos away from the ball to Argyropoulos, which resulted in a serious injury of the latter. The match was interrupted and eventually awarded to Panathinaikos with the final score remaining as it was until that minute.) | 7–1 | 3–1 | 3–2 | 4–1 |
| Aris | 1–2 | 2–2 | | 4–1 | 4–2 | 6–2 | 2–0 | 2–1 |
| AEK Athens | 0–2 | 2–2 | 2–1 | | 1–1 | 3–1 | 3–2 | 0–0 |
| PAOK | 3–0 | 1–3 | 1–2 | 1–2 | | 1–1 | 3–1 | 2–0 |
| Iraklis | 0–4 | 3–3 | 1–2 | 8–1 | 1–0 | | 2–1 | 3–1 |
| Ethnikos Piraeus | 1–1 | 0–0 | 1–3 | 0–1 | 1–3 | 0–0 | | 2–1 |
| Apollon Athens | 2–2 | 0–4 | 1–1 | 2–0 | 0–1 | 2–1 | 0–1 | |

Source: rsssf
Legend: Blue = home team win; Yellow = draw; Red = away team win.

=== Relegation play-offs ===
| Team 1 | Agg. | Team 2 | 1st leg | 2nd leg |
|---|---|---|---|---|
| Iraklis | 6–1 | Megas Alexandros | 3–0 | 3–1 |
| Ethnikos Piraeus | 4–3 | Amyna Kokkinia | 3–2 | 1–1 |
| Apollon Athens | 7–2 | Goudi Athens | 4–0 | 3–2 |

== Top scorers ==
| Rank | Player | Club | Goals |
|---|---|---|---|
| 1 | (Greece) Nikos Kitsos | Aris | 13 |
| 2 | (Greece) Georgios Andrianopoulos | Olympiacos | 12 |
| 3 | (Greece) Mimis Pierrakos | Panathinaikos | 10 |
| 4 | (Greece) Dimitris Baltasis | Panathinaikos | 7 |
| 4 | (Greece) Diomidis Symeonidis | Panathinaikos | 7 |
| 4 | (Greece) Iordanis Vogdanou | Aris | 7 |
| 4 | (Greece) Nikolaos Angelakis | Aris | 7 |
| 4 | (Greece) Iordanis Papaiordanidis | PAOK | 7 |
| 4 | (Greece) Vasilios Andrianopoulos | Olympiacos | 7 |
| 10 | (Greece) Kostas Andrianopoulos | Olympiacos | 6 |
| 10 | (Greece) Lazaros Koufas | Iraklis | 6 |
| 10 | (Greece) Nikos Miliopoulos | Iraklis | 6 |
