= 1929–30 Panhellenic Championship =

2nd season of top-tier football league in Greece

Panhellenic Championship
- Season: 1929–30
- Champions: Panathinaikos; 1st Greek title
- Relegated: none
- Matches: 6
- Goals: 30 (5 per match)
- Top goalscorer: Angelos Messaris (7 goals)
- Biggest home win: Panathinaikos 8–2 Olympiacos
- Biggest away win: Aris 1–4 Panathinaikos
- Highest scoring: Panathinaikos 8–2 Olympiacos
- Longest winning run: Panathinaikos
- Longest unbeaten run: Panathinaikos (4 matches)
- Longest winless run: Olympiacos; Aris (3 matches)
- Longest losing run: Olympiacos (3 matches)
- Highest attendance: 10,000; Panathinaikos 8–2 Olympiacos (1 June 1930)

The 1929–30 Panhellenic Championship was the second season of the highest football league of Greece. It was held with the participation of 3 teams, the champions of the founding Associations of the HFF, Athens, Piraeus and Macedonia, in which Panathinaikos, Olympiacos and Aris respectively finished first. Panathinaikos emerged champion for their first title, undefeated, which among other things on 1 June 1930, achieving a historic 8–2 victory over Olympiacos, which is the widest victory margin in a match between the two eternal opponents.

The point system was: Win: 2 points - Draw: 1 point - Loss: 0 points.

== Qualification round ==
=== Athens Football Clubs Association ===
Pos	Team	Pld	W	D	L	GF	GA	GD	Pts	Qualification	PAO	AEK	ATR	APOL	AOP	ATH
1	Panathinaikos (Q)	10	8	2	0	55	12	+43	18	Final Round		1–1	10–3	4–1	4–2	11–0
2	AEK Athens	10	7	2	1	36	6	+30	16		1–1		1–0	1–0	3–1	6–1
3	Atromitos	10	4	2	4	16	28	−12	10		1–10	2–1		2–2	2–0	2–0 (Note: Awarded)
4	Apollon Athens	10	3	2	5	17	16	+1	8		1–3	0–2	1–1		1–0	8–0
5	AO Palaio Faliro	10	3	0	7	12	25	−13	6		1–4	0–8	3–1	1–2		2–0
6	Athinaikos	10	1	0	9	4	53	−49	2		1–7	0–12	0–2	2–1	0–2	

Source: Athletic Echo
(Q) Qualified for the phase indicated

==== Top scorers ====
Rank	Player	Club	Goals
1	(Greece) Angelos Messaris	Panathinaikos	13
2	(Greece) Dimitris Mougras	AEK Athens	10
3	(Greece) Ilias Iliaskos	AEK Athens	9
3	(Greece) Kostas Negrepontis	AEK Athens	9
3	(Greece) Antonis Tziralidis	Panathinaikos	9
3	(Greece) Michalis Papadopoulos	Panathinaikos	9
7	(Greece) D. Kolomvounis	Atromitos	7
7	(Greece) Diomidis Symeonidis	Panathinaikos	7
7	(Greece) Antonis Migiakis	Panathinaikos	7
7	(Greece) Antonis Tsolinas	Panathinaikos	7

=== Piraeus Football Clubs Association ===
Pos	Team	Pld	W	D	L	GF	GA	GD	Pts	Qualification	OLY	ETH	AMY
1	Olympiacos (Q)	4	4	0	0	17	3	+14	8	Final Round		4–1	6–0
2	Ethnikos Piraeus	4	2	0	2	8	9	−1	4		1–3		4–1
3	Amyna Kokkinia	4	0	0	4	3	16	−13	0		1–4	1–2	

Source: Athletic Echo
(Q) Qualified for the phase indicated

==== Top scorers ====
Rank	Player	Club	Goals
1	(Greece) Georgios Andrianopoulos	Olympiacos	7
2	(Greece) Dinos Andrianopoulos	Olympiacos	5
3	(Greece) Charalampos Pezonis	Olympiacos	1
3	(Greece) Nikos Tsiritakis	Ethnikos Piraeus	1

=== Macedonia Football Clubs Association ===
Pos	Team	Pld	W	D	L	GF	GA	GD	Pts	Qualification	ARIS	IRA	PAOK	THER	MEG	MAK
1	Aris (Q)	10	9	1	0	44	9	+35	19	Final Round		2–0	2–0	4–2	9–1	5–0
2	Iraklis	10	8	1	1	24	14	+10	17		1–1		4–1	3–1	4–2	1–0
3	PAOK	10	6	0	4	23	18	+5	12		2–5	2–3		1–0	2–0	6–0
4	Thermaikos	10	3	0	7	21	29	−8	6		1–3	1–6	3–4		4–1	4–2
5	Megas Alexandros	10	2	0	8	10	28	−18	4		0–2 (Note: Without match)	1–2	0–1	3–2		0–2
6	Makedonikos	10	1	0	9	10	38	−28	2		2–11	1–2	1–4	2–3	0–2	

Source: RSSSF
(Q) Qualified for the phase indicated

==== Top scorers ====
Rank	Player	Club	Goals
1	(France) Raymond Étienne	PAOK	8
2	(Greece) Christos Leontaridis	Aris	7
3	(Greece) Nikolaos Angelakis	Aris	6
3	(Greece) Lazaros Koufas	Iraklis	6
5	(Greece) Ch. Batzoglou	Iraklis	4
6	(Greece) Athanasiou	Iraklis	3
6	(Greece) Koutaliagas	Iraklis	3
6	(Greece) Venetis	Thermaikos	3
6	(Greece) Dinopoulos	Megas Alexandros	3
6	(Greece) Dionysis Kaltekis	Aris	3
6	(Greece) Giannis Kavourmatzis	PAOK	3

== Final round ==
=== League table ===
Pos	Team	Pld	W	D	L	GF	GA	GD	Pts	PAO	ARIS	OLY
1	Panathinaikos (C)	4	3	1	0	16	6	+10	7		2–2	8–2
2	Aris	4	1	1	2	5	12	−7	3	1–4		2–1
3	Olympiacos	4	1	0	3	9	12	−3	2	1–2	5–0	

Source: rsssf
(C) Champions

=== Matches ===
18 May 1930
Matchday 1

Olympiacos	5–0	Aris
G. Andrianopoulos 3', 55'; D. Andrianopoulos 56', 85'; V. Andrianopoulos 76'	Report

Velodrome, Piraeus
Referee: Doychev (Bulgary)

1 June 1930
Matchday 2

Panathinaikos	8–2	Olympiacos
Simoenidis 10', 30'; Messaris 20', 25'; Pierrakos 53', 81'; Kourantis 72' (o.g.); Migiakis 79'	Report	G. Andrianopoulos 56', 59'

Leoforos Alexandras Stadium, Ampelokipoi
Attendance: 10,000
Referee: Barlasina (Italy)

8 June 1930
Matchday 3

Aris	1–4	Panathinaikos
Vogdanou 57'	Report	Messaris 19', 36', 51'; Pierrakos 34'

Iraklis Stadium, Thessaloniki
Referee: Barlasina (Italy)

15 June 1930
Matchday 4

Olympiacos	1–2	Panathinaikos
Panopoulos 2'	Report	Messaris 25'; Pierrakos 34'

Velodrome, Piraeus
Referee: Barlasina (Italy)

22 June 1930
Matchday 5

Panathinaikos	2–2	Aris
Messaris 36'; Pierrakos 87'	Report	Vikelidis 19'; Vogdanou 24'

Leoforos Alexandras Stadium, Ampelokipoi
Referee: Barlasina (Italy)

26 June 1930
Matchday 6

Aris	2–1	Olympiacos
Vogdanou 66'; Kalogiannis 78'	Report	Ragos 2'

Iraklis Stadium, Thessaloniki
Referee: Rudzić (Yugoslavia)

== Top scorers ==
Rank	Player	Club	Goals
1	(Greece) Angelos Messaris	Panathinaikos	7
2	(Greece) Georgios Andrianopoulos	Olympiacos	4
2	(Greece) Mimis Pierrakos	Panathinaikos	4
4	(Greece) Iordanis Vogdanou	Aris	3
5	(Greece) Dinos Andrianopoulos	Olympiacos	2
5	(Greece) Vasilios Andrianopoulos	Olympiacos	2
