= 1927–28 Panhellenic Championship =

1st season of top-tier football league in Greece

Panhellenic Championship
- Season: 1927–28
- Champions: Aris; 1st Greek title
- Relegated: none
- Matches: 6
- Goals: 24 (4 per match)
- Top goalscorer: Nikolaos Angelakis (4 goals)
- Biggest home win: Ethnikos Piraeus 5–0 Atromitos
- Biggest away win: Atromitos 1–3 Aris
- Highest scoring: Ethnikos Piraeus 5–0 Atromitos
- Longest winless run: Atromitos (4 matches)
- Longest losing run: Atromitos

The 1927–28 Panhellenic Championship was the first season of the highest football league of Greece. It was held with the participation of 3 teams, the champions of the founding Associations of the HFF, Athens, Piraeus and Macedonia, in which Atromitos, Ethnikos Piraeus and Aris finished first, respectively. Aris eventually won the championship.

At the beginning of the season, the HFF expelled Olympiacos from the championship of Piraeus and consequently the Panhellenic Championship. They also forbade the other clubs from playing against them even in friendly matches. However, Panathinaikos, AEK Athens and Apollon Athens expected financial income from the tournaments they organized with the participation of Olympiacos. Thus, on 31 October, the HFF expelled the other clubs, as well. As a result, Panathinaikos, Olympiacos and AEK Athens formed an alliance called POK, from the initials of the words Podosferikós Ómilos Kéntrou (Central Football Group) or from a paraphrase of the initials of their names; "Panathinaikos"-"Olympiacos"-"Konstantinoupόleos". In February 1928, Apollon Athens joined the alliance, with the press calling it "POKA". The non-participation of these clubs weakened the championship, as the fans preferred the international friendlies of the strong clubs and the tournaments that have been established during the holidays since then. The devaluation of their competitions forced the HFF to revoke their dismissals in July 1928 and from the next season the clubs returned to their championships. The point system was: Win: 2 points - Draw: 1 point - Loss: 0 points.

== Qualification round ==
=== Athens Football Clubs Association ===
After the departure of Panathinaikos, AEK Athens and Apollon Athens, only 5 clubs participated. Atromitos, Goudi Athens, Athinaikos, Armeniki Enosis and Aias Athens. They played qualifying and final matches, without it being clear exactly what system was applied. The only thing that is certain is that after the qualifiers, Goudi Athens and Atromitos qualified for the final.

Summary
Team 1	Score	Team 2
Atromitos	4–3	Goudi Athens

20 May 1928
18:00 EET

Atromitos	4–3	Goudi Athens
Stamatopoulos 50', 60'; Stathopoulos 70'; Perantakos 85'	Report	Baltas 24'; Mougras 30', 45'

Rouf Stadium, Rouf
Referee: Stavros Chatzopoulos (Athens)

=== Piraeus Football Clubs Association ===
The system of conduct was not clear, but it is known that a final was held in May 1928, between Ethnikos Piraeus and Amyna Kokkinia, who seem to have been the only clubs in the league, after the punishment of Olympiacos. The match was held on 13 May 1928, at the Neo Phaliron Velodrome, where Ethnikos Piraeus were leading by 4–1. However, the players of Amyna Kokkinia, not accepting their imminent defeat, caused incidents and the match was interrupted. The Piraeus Association stopped the match and declared Ethnikos Piraeus as champion.

=== Macedonia Football Clubs Association ===
Pos	Team	Pld	GF	GA	GD	Pts	Qualification
1	Aris (Q)	10	33	8	+25	18	Final Round
2	PAOK	10	28	10	+18	15	
3	Iraklis	10	29	14	+15	14	
4	Megas Alexandros	10	17	34	-17	7	
5	Atlantas Thessaloniki	10	12	27	-15	4	
6	Thermaikos	10	11	37	-26	1	

== Final round ==
=== League table ===
Pos	Team	Pld	W	D	L	GF	GA	GD	Pts	ARIS	ETH	ATR
1	Aris (C)	4	3	0	1	11	6	+5	6		3–1	3–1
2	Ethnikos Piraeus	4	2	1	1	10	6	+4	5	3–2		5–0
3	Atromitos	4	0	1	3	3	12	−9	1	1–3	1–1	

Source: rsssf
(C) Champions

== Top scorers ==
Rank	Player	Club	Goals
1	(Greece) Nikolaos Angelakis	Aris	4
2	(Greece) Dionysis Kaltekis	Aris	2
2	(Greece) Antonis Tsolinas	Ethnikos Piraeus	2
4	(Greece) Κostas Vikelidis	Aris	1
4	(Greece) Savvas Vogiatzis	Aris	1
4	(Armenia) Zareh Minasyan	Aris	1
4	(Greece) Christos Leontaridis	Aris	1
4	(Greece) Petropoulos	Ethnikos Piraeus	1
4	(Greece) N. Tsiritakis	Ethnikos Piraeus	1
4	(Greece) Rigopoulos	Atromitos	1
