= 1943–44 Panhellenic Championship =

Abandoned season of top-tier football league in Greece

Panhellenic Championship
- Season: 1943–44
- Champions: none
- Relegated: none

The 1943–44 Panhellenic Championship did not occur due to the events of the WW2 and the Axis occupation of Greece. Nevertheless, in May 1943, football matches were organized by the municipality of Piraeus, where Olympiacos and Panathinaikos participated in.

Despite that the Panhellenic Championship was not held, in the December of the same year a Holiday Cup, later called "Christmas Cup" took place, where Olympiacos, Panathinaikos and AEK Athens competed with all 3 games being played at Leoforos Alexandras Stadium This was in fact the only event during the years of The Occupation that was completed. Furthermore, in February 1944, the disputes between the HFF and the Union of Greek Athletes caused Panathinaikos to create the "Panathinaikos Tournament", but it failed to end. Additionally, a tournament called "Unified Center Championship" took place, which started in February 1944 with 22 clubs from both Athens and Piraeus. The point system was: Win: 3 points - Draw: 2 points - Loss: 1 point.

Holiday Cup
Team 1	Score	Team 2
Panathinaikos	2–5	Olympiacos
Panathinaikos	1–2	AEK Athens
Olympiacos	0–1	AEK Athens

== See also ==
- Christmas Cup
