= Jerónimo Barrales =

Argentine footballer

Personal information
- Date of birth: 28 January 1987 (age 39)
- Place of birth: Adrogué, Argentina
- Height: 1.86 m (6 ft 1 in)
- Position: Forward

Youth career
- 1999–2006: Banfield

Senior career*
Years	Team	Apps	(Gls)
2006–2011	Banfield	78	(11)
2009–2010	→ Recreativo (loan)	29	(2)
2011	→ Santiago Wanderers (loan)	14	(4)
2011–2012	Unión Santa Fe	27	(2)
2012–2013	Huracán	32	(12)
2013–2015	Asteras Tripolis	64	(25)
2015–2017	Sivasspor	7	(0)
2016	→ Huracán (loan)	9	(0)
2017	→ Johor Darul Ta'zim (loan)	2	(0)
2017	→ Johor Darul Ta'zim II (loan)	12	(10)
2018	Gimnasia LP	8	(0)
2018–2019	Lamia	26	(9)
2019–2023	Asteras Tripolis	108	(30)
2023–2025	Kalamata	39	(9)
Total		455	(114)
- * Club domestic league appearances and goals

Jerónimo Barrales (born 28 January 1987) is an Argentine former professional footballer who played as a forward.

== Club career ==
Barrales was born in Adrogué, Buenos Aires Province. After playing rugby in his late infancy he joined Club Atlético Banfield's youth system at the age of 12, and made his professional debut in 2006, going on to establish as a key member of the first team; during the 2007–08 season, the Apertura and Clausura tournaments combined, he scored eight goals in 32 games as they ranked third in the former.

On 3 July 2009, Spanish Segunda División club Recreativo de Huelva signed Barrales on loan. At the end of the season he returned to Banfield, where he failed to reproduce his previous form, leaving for Santiago Wanderers of Chile on loan in early January 2011. The following year, he returned to his homeland and joined Primera Nacional side Club Atlético Huracán.

On 5 July 2013, Barrales signed with Asteras Tripolis F.C. for an undisclosed fee. He made his Super League Greece debut on 18 August, playing the full 90 minutes in a 3–3 home draw with PAS Giannina FC.

Barrales was linked to Standard Liège in April 2015, after solid performances that eventually led him to be crowned league top scorer in the 2014–15 campaign with 17 goals, helping his team finish fourth. In addition, he scored three times in the group stage of the UEFA Europa League, twice against Tottenham Hotspur.

On 18 August 2015, Barrales joined Turkish club Sivasspor after agreeing to a three-year contract for €1.5 million. Grossly unsettled in the country, he then returned to Huracán on loan.

Barrales signed for Johor Darul Ta'zim F.C. of the Malaysia Super League on 7 January 2017, but after several poor performances he was controversially sent to the feeder team outside the transfer window, with compatriot Gabriel Guerra moving in opposite direction to help his team win the double.

Barrales returned to the Greek top division in July 2018, signing with PAS Lamia 1964 from Club de Gimnasia y Esgrima La Plata. He scored his first goal for the club on 7 October in a 1–1 home draw with OFI Crete FC, adding a further two in the next two matches against Athlitiki Enosi Larissa FC (2–1 away win) and Levadiakos FC (3–2 victory, home).

On 9 August 2019, Barrales returned to former side Asteras for an undisclosed fee. He scored 11 goals in 26 games in the first season in his second spell to help to a mid-table finish, before agreeing to a one-year extension on 20 July 2020.

== Honours ==
Individual

- Super League Greece Top Scorer: 2014–15 (17 goals)
- Super League Greece Team of the Season: 2014–15
- Asteras Tripolis Player of the Season: 2019–20, 2020–21
