= Vasilios Andrianopoulos =

Greek footballer

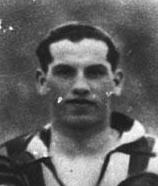

Personal information
- Full name: Vasilios Andrianopoulos
- Date of birth: 1909
- Place of birth: Piraeus, Kingdom of Greece
- Date of death: 1989 (aged 79–80)
- Place of death: Piraeus, Greece
- Position: Forward

Senior career*
Years	Team	Apps	(Gls)
–1923	Peiraikos Syndesmos		
1923–1924	Athletic and Football Club of Piraeus		
1925–1933	Olympiacos		

International career
1929–1931	Greece	7	(4)
- * Club domestic league appearances and goals

Vasilios Andrianopoulos (Greek: Βασίλειος Ανδριανόπουλος; 1908–1989) was a Greek footballer. He was Giannis Andrianopoulos' brother.

Andrianopoulos started his career with Peiraikos Syndesmos FC and continued with the Athletic and Football Club of Piraeus, Olympiakos Omilos and Olympiacos F.C., as each of his prior clubs were absorbed into the next. He scored 92 goals in 161 official and unofficial matches for the club.

He was capped 7 times by the Greece National Football Team, scoring 3 goals. After his playing career, Vasilis took on various official football capacities.

He died in Piraeus in 1989.
