= Mimis Pierrakos =

Greek footballer (1906–1940)

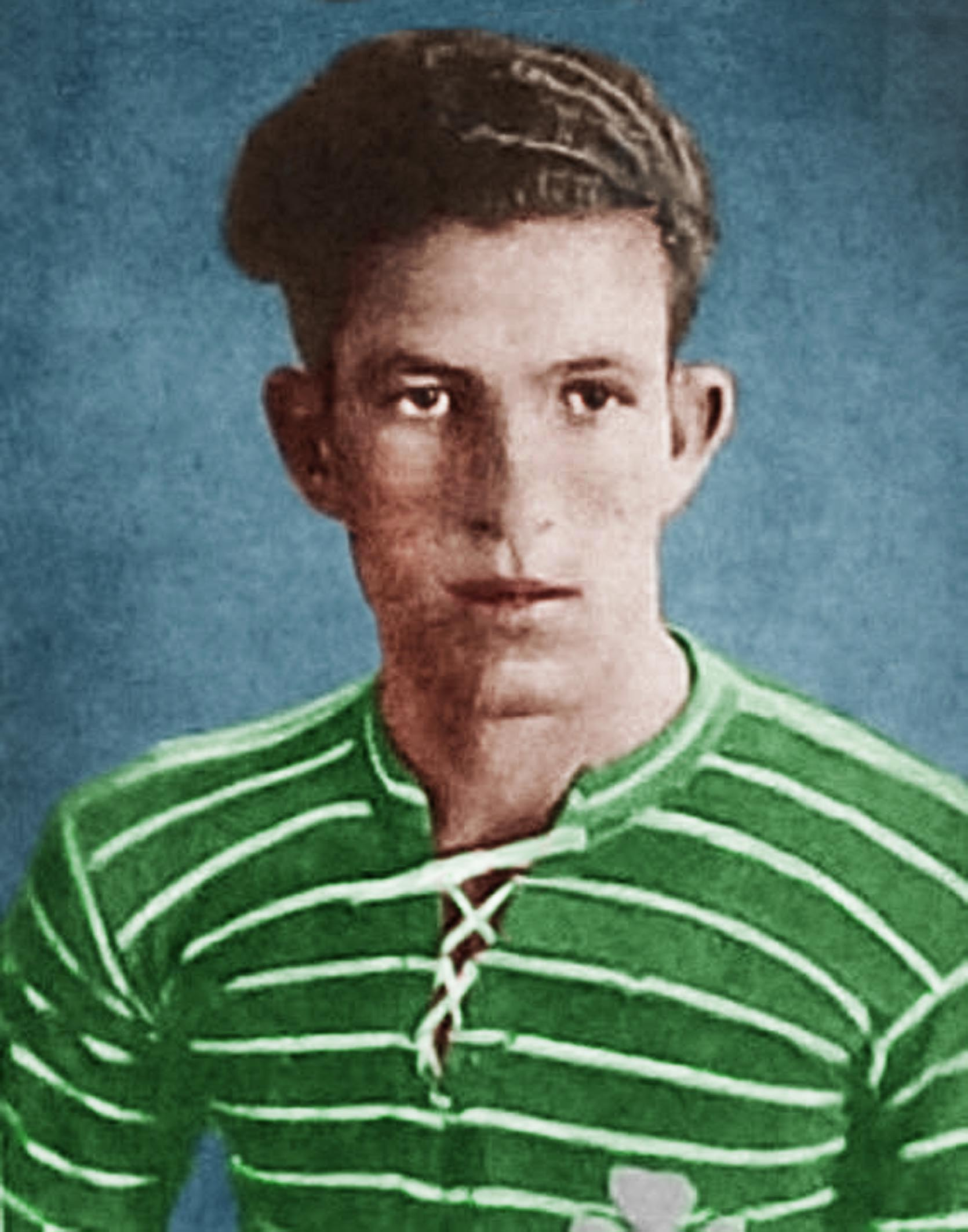
Mimis Pierrakos

Mimis Pierrakos (Greek: Μίμης Πιερράκος; 1906 – November 1940) was a Greek footballer.

== Football career ==
A co-player of Angelos Messaris and the top goalscorer for Panathinaikos in 1936, with 18 goals in 10 games. He played for Panathinaikos in two spells (1926–33 and 1936–40) as well as an interval with the Cyprus club Anorthosis Famagusta (1933–36). He represented the Greece national football team internationally between 1931 and 1938. Beside his excellent technique he was also distinguished for his morals.

As player of Panathinaikos, he won one greek championship (1930) and two Greek Cup titles (1940, 1948).

== Death ==
During the Italian invasion on 28 October 1940, he found himself at the front line of the battle, in the north Epirus mountains, serving as a radio operator. He was killed in the battlefield in the outskirts of Pogradetsh, only a few days before the Greek troops entered victoriously the city (30 November 1940).

Michalis Papazoglou was one of those in PAO who played a leading part in the return of the bones of the hero Mimis Pierrakos from North Epirus back to Athens. In 1950 some veteran players of Panathinaikos together with relatives and friends of Pierrakos went up to the Epirus mountains and found the grave of this hero. They returned his bones back to Athens, covered with the flag of Panathinaikos and buried them at the cemetery of Zografou on 19 November 1950.
