= P.O.K. =

Former group of three Greek football teams

P.O.K. was a coalition, a kind of athletic trust, of the three main teams of Greek football (the "big three") which lasted until the 1960s. The term dates to in 1927, when Olympiacos F.C., Panathinaikos F.C. and AEK Athens F.C. withdrew from the Panhellenic Championship after disagreements with the Hellenic Football Federation (HFF), mainly over the championship's financial status. The HFF determined that league's revenues would be equally divided between all teams that participated. Olympiacos, Panathinaikos and AEK Athens did not agree with this, and formed a group called P.O.K. During that season, they played friendly matches with each other. P.O.K. remained in the following decades in the form of friendly competitions. Eventually, on 7 March 1963, the POK officially ceased to exist. The establishment of a unified league championship (Alpha Ethniki) and the participation of the Greek teams in the European football cups organised by UEFA made this institution weaken and finally to be abolished.

The name P.O.K. is currently used to allude to the continuing dominance of the three clubs in the Super League Greece, and is often used derisively by rival fans. Rarely does a team outside these three finish in the top three spots of the Championship; doing so is informally called "breaking the P.O.K.". Since 1928, only three other teams - Aris Thessaloniki, AEL and PAOK - have won the Greek Championship.

== Establishment ==
In 1927–28, EEA (Committee of Professional Sports: Greek, Επιτροπή Επαγγελματικού Αθλητισμού) established the first football championship in Greece with teams of the 3 founding football associations: Athens, Piraeus and Macedonia Football Clubs Association. Before the season had begun, EEA ordered other teams not to play against Olympiacos, as they were punished by the Hellenic Football Federation. Panathinaikos and AEK Athens did not obey and organized friendly matches. This was part of a dispute between these three clubs and the league administration for control of the league. As a consequence, the EEA dropped all three clubs on 31 October 1927, and organized the league without them. The teams that took their place were Atromitos from Athens, Ethnikos Piraeus from Piraeus, and Aris from Thessaloniki.

== Activities ==
The teams that constituted the P.O.K. tried to weaken the EEA, holding their championship with the participation of some other smaller clubs, although the majority of clubs continued under the official administration of EEA.

They also organized various tournaments, during which they invited other foreign football clubs from Yugoslavia, Hungary, Czechoslovakia and Romania, such as Ferencváros, OFK Beograd etc. The three clubs shared the costs of hosting as well as the revenue from tickets sold.

The tournaments organized for the Christmas and Easter holidays were respectively called the Cup and the Easter Cup. They were financially very successful, as the three clubs were supported by the majority of fans in the Athens area. These tournaments continued even after the war when relations with the EEA had again resumed.

== The end of conflict ==
In July 1928 the EEA made the decision to reinstate the three major clubs. However, this decision did not mark the end of the collaboration since the clubs recognized that they had vested interests in each other. Essentially, this continued until the establishment of professional football. Some areas of cooperation were:

- The organization of the Easter and Christmas cups by each one of them in succession with the invitation of foreign clubs until the late 1950s.
- Dissuasion of transfers from one club to another and particularly between Olympiacos and Panathinaikos, even for athletes of other sports, except football.
- Mutual help in the elections for the administration of EEA and the decisions of the Board. The climax occurred in 1976, when the representative of the Olympic committee responsible for the next to vote saved, from demotion, Panathinaikos through bribery of the player I. Hercules, which has become known as the "Case of flowers".

== Easter Cup ==
The first Easter Cup was organized by P.O.K. in 1928 with the participation of the Serbian and Romanian Beogradski benzo corps. It continued, with interruptions, until 1964. Out of the 22 total events that took place, it was stopped only once before its completion in 1948. Olympiacos won the cub 11 times, AEK and Panathinaikos have four wins each, while Ethnikos Piraeus, 1. FC Köln and Progresul București have one win each. From 1930 to 1935 (with the exception of 1934) there were no events held due to obligations of the P.O.K. clubs on domestic competitions, they continued to play against each other at Leoforos Alexandras Stadium during Easter.

Winners:

- 1928: Olympiacos
- 1929: Olympiacos
- 1930-1933: Not held
- 1934: Olympiacos
- 1936: Olympiacos
- 1937: Ethnikos Piraeus
- 1938: AEK Athens
- 1939: Not held
- 1940: Panathinaikos
- 1943: Olympiacos
- 1944: AEK Athens
- 1945: Olympiacos
- 1946: Olympiacos
- 1947: Panathinaikos
- 1948: Interrupted
- 1949: Olympiacos
- 1950: Not held
- 1951: Olympiacos
- 1952: Panathinaikos
- 1953: Olympiacos
- 1954: Panathinaikos
- 1955: AEK Athens
- 1956: 1. FC Köln
- 1957: Progresul București
- 1958: AEK Athens
- 1959: Olympiacos

== Christmas Cup ==
The first Christmas Cup took place in 1943 and lasted for two years. Organized with the participation of foreign clubs and the three clubs of P.O.K., this continued with various interruptions until 1962. All in all, there were 17 events held plus one (in 1951) which was stopped before completion. The team with the most wins (eleven) was Olympiacos. The biggest defeat of a Greek team in this tournament took place on 26 December 1959, when Panathinaikos was defeated by Vojvodina with an impressive score of 3–8 at the Alexandra Avenue stadium. Three of the Serbs' eight goals were scored by Toza Veselinovic, who later coached Olympiakos.

Winners:

- 1943–44 AEK Athens
- 1945–1946: Not held
- 1947: AEK Athens
- 1948: Olympiacos
- 1949: Panathinaikos
- 1950: No Champions
- 1951: Interrupted
- 1952: Olympiacos
- 1953: Olympiacos
- 1954: Olympiacos
- 1955: Panathinaikos
- 1956: Olympiacos
- 1957: AEK Athens
- 1958: No Champions
- 1959: Olympiacos
- 1960: Olympiacos
- 1961: Olympiacos
- 1962: Olympiacos

== Sources ==
- Newspaper "Athletic Echo"
- Giannis Diakogiannis, "Football", Kaktos Edition, 1979
