= Angelos Messaris =

Greek footballer (1910-1978)

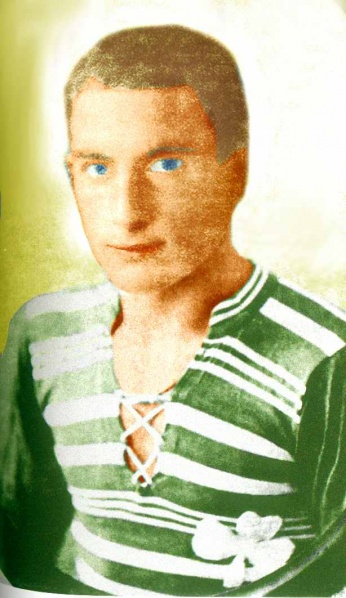
- Angelos Messaris in Panathinaikos' shirt

Personal information
- Full name: Angelos Messaris
- Date of birth: 1910
- Place of birth: Cape Town, Union of South Africa
- Date of death: 6 June 1978 (aged 66–67)
- Place of death: Athens, Greece
- Position: Striker

Senior career*
Years	Team	Apps	(Gls)
1925–1927	Goudi		
1927–1931	Panathinaikos	8	(11)

International career
1929–1931	Greece	4	(2)
- * Club domestic league appearances and goals

Angelos Messaris (Greek: Άγγελος Μεσσάρης; 1910 – 6 June 1978) was a Greek footballer. He played for Panathinaikos and he is widely regarded as the best Greek player of the pre-war era. This is probably also due to the myth that for decades followed his sudden and mysterious early leaving from football. He made his last appearance in the football field on 23 April 1931 at the age of 21, in a match against AEK Athens. Panathinaikos were losing 2-0 but Messaris tied the score with two reverse headers and he received great cheering. His nickname was "the Blonde Angel" (Greek: "ο Ξανθός Άγγελος").

== Club career ==
Messaris was descended from the Messaris family of Kefalonia, an island in the Ionian sea, but he was born in Cape Town, South Africa in 1910. In 1924, he moved to Athens, and spent three years at Goudi before transferring to Panathinaikos. His dribbling skills, his ball control together with his versatile mind and hard work quickly propelled him up the ranks in Greek football. During his short career he scored 53 goals: 23 in the Athens FCA Championship, 11 in the Panhellenic Championship, 2 with the Greece national team and 17 in international and friendly games of Panathinaikos and the mixed team of Athens. He was top scorer in the 1929–30 season with 7 goals.

Messaris is widely known for his performance in the 8–2 victory over rivals Olympiacos, where he scored three goals and had three assists. This is the largest win either rival had recorded against each other. He also performed well in a 4–1 victory versus Aris, which inspired the following chant: "We scored eight to Olympiacos and four more to Aris. Hooray to Angelos Messaris!" (Greek: "Εβάλαμε οκτώ στον Ολυμπιακό και άλλα τέσσερα στον Άρη. Γεια σου Άγγελε Μεσσάρη!")

== After football ==
After giving up football, Messaris concentrated on his studies at the National Technical University of Athens. Then he returned to South Africa where he concluded his studies and following this he came back to Greece where he became an executive manager at the Doxiadis enterprises. It is said that the reason why he left Panathinaikos rests on the unbearable pressure Apostolos Nikolaidis was putting on him in order to persuade him to commit himself to football and forget about his studies and left-wing and communist political views. Kitroef claims that the key factor of Messaris leaving pertains to the suspicion that executives of Panathinaikos had intervened to be rejected in university admission test in order to keep playing football. In a short telephone talk that he had with journalist Dimitris Liberopoulos back in 1973 Messaris said: "Please leave me alone... The football player you are asking for died in 1931". He died in 1978 and his funeral was attended by thousands of people.

== Honours ==
Panathinaikos

- Panhellenic Championship: 1929–30
- Athens FCA Championship: 1928–29, 1929–30, 1930–31

Individual

- Panhellenic Championship top scorer: 1929–30
- Athens FCA Championship top scorer: 1929–30, 1930–31
