= Antonis Migiakis =

Greek footballer and manager

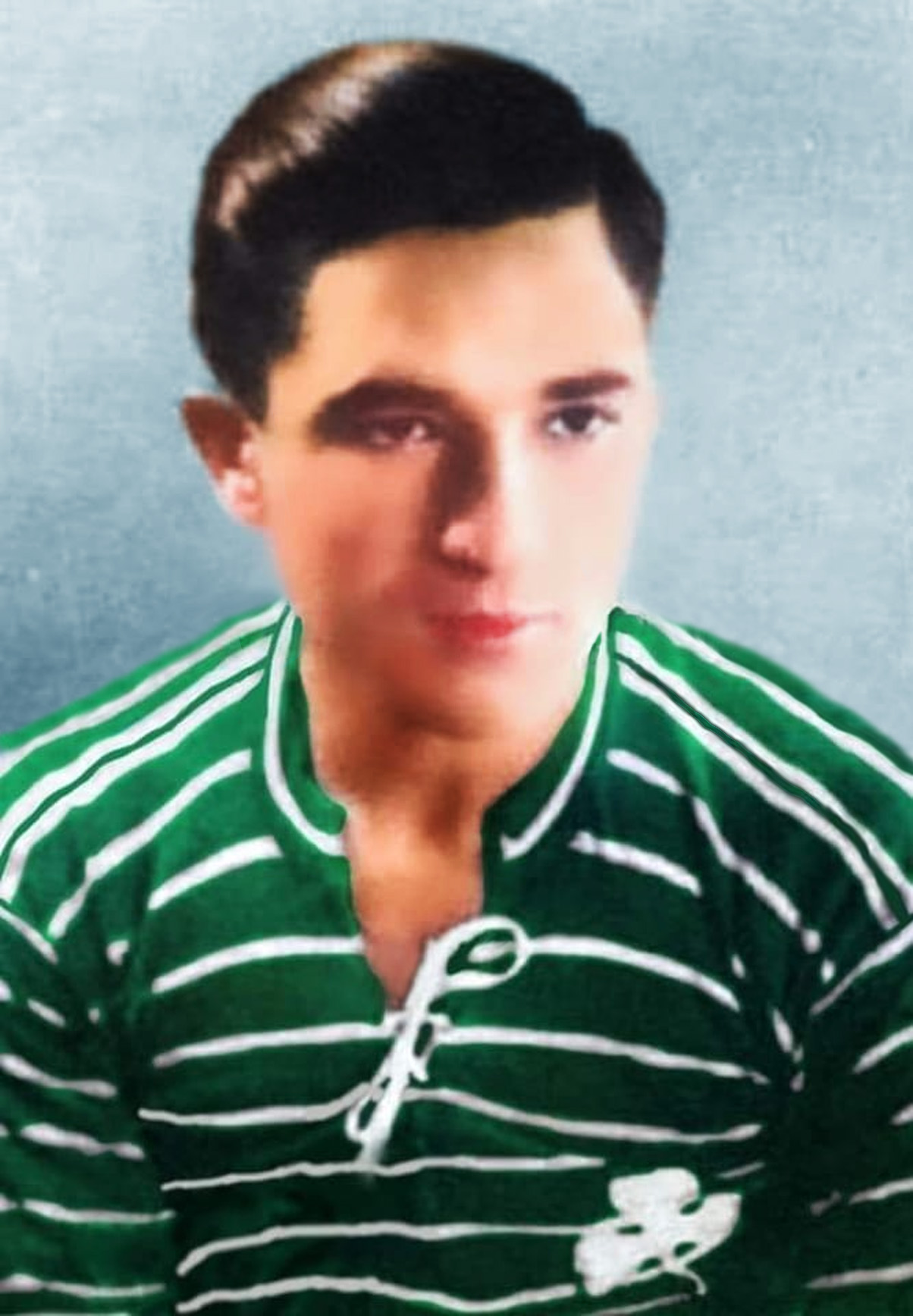

Personal information
- Date of birth: 23 October 1911
- Place of birth: Greece
- Date of death: 19 November 1999 (aged 88)
- Place of death: Greece
- Position: Striker

Senior career*
Years	Team	Apps	(Gls)
1928–1947	Panathinaikos		

International career
1930–1938	Greece	17	(3)

Managerial career
- 1945–1948: Panathinaikos
- 1950–1951: Panathinaikos
- 1951–1953: Greece
- 1954–1955: Greece
- 1959–1960: Panathinaikos
- 1976: Panathinaikos
- Atromitos
- AE Chalandri
- Proodeftiki
- * Club domestic league appearances and goals

Antonis Migiakis (Greek: Aντώνης Mηγιάκης; born 23 October 1911 – 19 November 1999) was a forward for Greek football team Panathinaikos in the 1930s. He is probably best remembered for his memorable performance in his team's 8–2 victory over Olympiacos. During his career he was capped 17 times, scoring 3 goals, for the Greece national football team.

As player of Panathinaikos, he won one greek championship (1930) and two greek cup titles (1940, 1948).

He was the Coach of the Greece national side at the 1952 Olympic Games.

== Honours ==
Panathinaikos

- Alpha Ethniki: 1930
- Greek Cup: 1940, 1948
