= Nikolaos Angelakis =

Greek footballer (1905–1986)

Nikos Angelakis
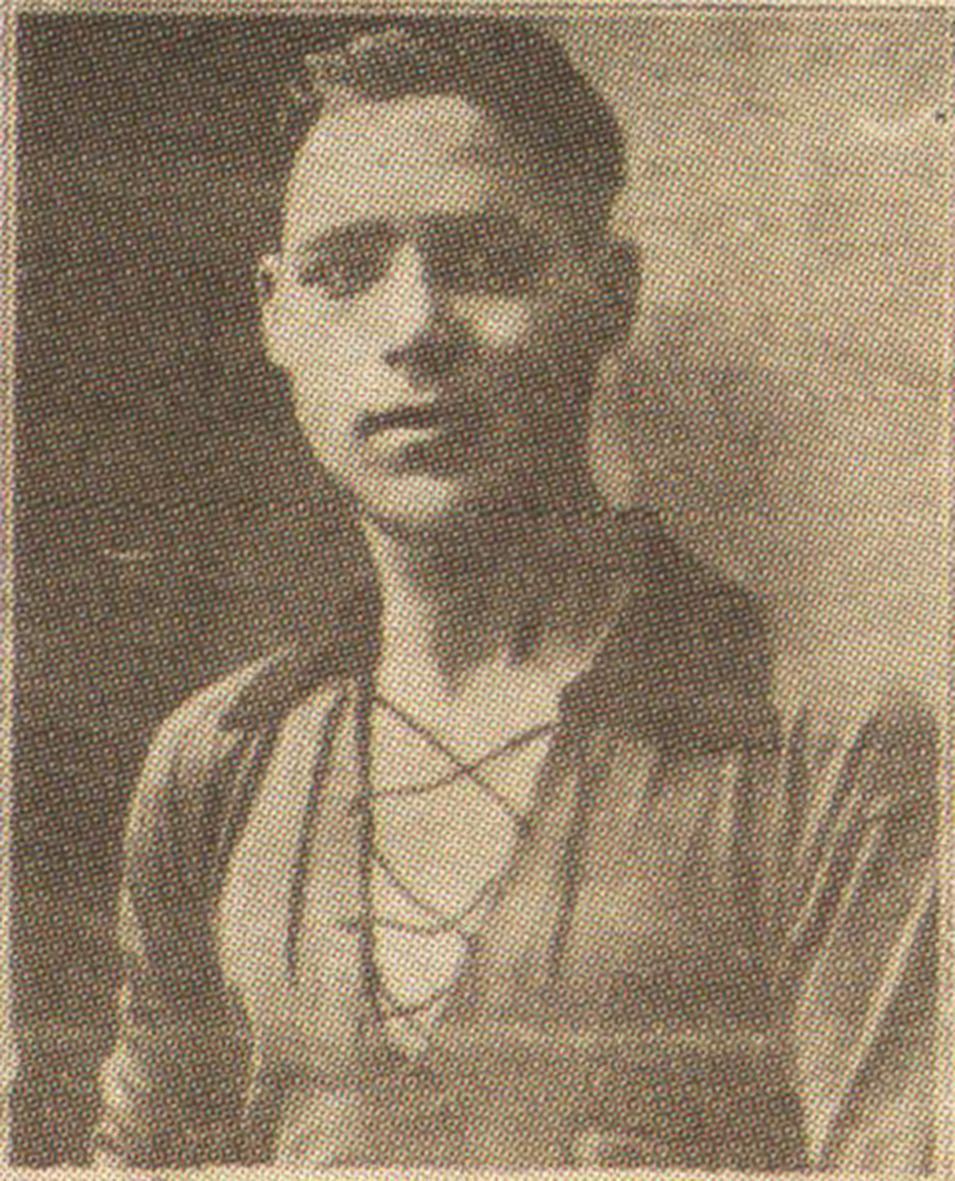
- Nikos Angelakis

Personal information
- Full name: Nikolaos Angelakis
- Date of birth: 1906
- Place of birth: Thessaloniki, Ottoman Empire
- Date of death: 26 October 1986 (aged 79–80)
- Place of death: Greece
- Position: Striker

Senior career*
Years	Team	Apps	(Gls)
1924–1938	Aris		(30)

International career
1929–1934	Greece	11	(2)

Managerial career
- 1948–1953: Aris
- * Club domestic league appearances and goals

Nikolaos Angelakis (Greek: Νικόλαος Αγγελάκης; 15 May 1905 – 29 October 1986) was a Greek footballer who played as a forward and a later manager.

== Career ==
Angelakis played for Aris and was a member of the 1932 side that won the Greek championship. That year, he was top-scorer of the Greek League with 15 goals (tied with teammate Nikos Kitsos).

He passed his whole career as a footballer of Aris, and is the top scorer with 14 goals in the matches against PAOK, the biggest "rivals" of Aris from the city.

During his career, Angelakis was capped 11 times by the Greece national football team and scored two goals, his debut coming in 1929.

Angelakis was the first of three generations of the Aggelakis family to be on the staff of Aris. He is the father of Rigas, who played football for Aris, and the grandfather of the present-day referee with the same name.

He scored overall 235 goals in 293 matches (105 in 132 official matches) with the shirt of Aris, breaking many goal-scoring records, and among them holds the record of 6 goals during a football half, in a league match in 1932.

== Honours ==
=== As a player ===
Aris

- Panhellenic Championship: 1927–28, 1931–32
- Macedonia FCA Championship: 1923–24, 1925–26, 1927–28, 1928–29, 1929–30, 1930–31, 1933–34, 1937–38

Individual

- Panhellenic Championship top scorer: 1927–28

=== As a manager ===
Aris

- Panhellenic Championship: 1945–46
- Macedonia FCA Championship: 1948–49, 1952–53

== See also ==
- List of one-club men in football
