= Georgios Andrianopoulos =

Greek footballer

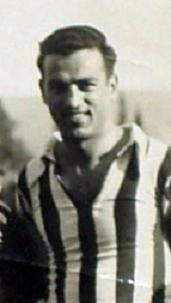

Personal information
- Date of birth: May 1903
- Date of death: 24 February 1980 (aged 76)
- Position: Forward

Senior career*
Years	Team	Apps	(Gls)
1918-	Athletic and Football Club of Piraeus		
-1923	Peiraikos Syndesmos		
1923–1924	Athletic and Football Club of Piraeus		
1925-1931	Olympiacos		

International career
1929–1930	Greece	3	(2)
- * Club domestic league appearances and goals

Georgios Andrianopoulos (May 1903 – 24 February 1980) was a Greek footballer. He played in three matches for the Greece national football team from 1929 to 1930. He was also part of Greece's squad for the football tournament at the 1920 Summer Olympics, but he did not play in any matches.
