= Antonis Tsolinas =

Greek footballer

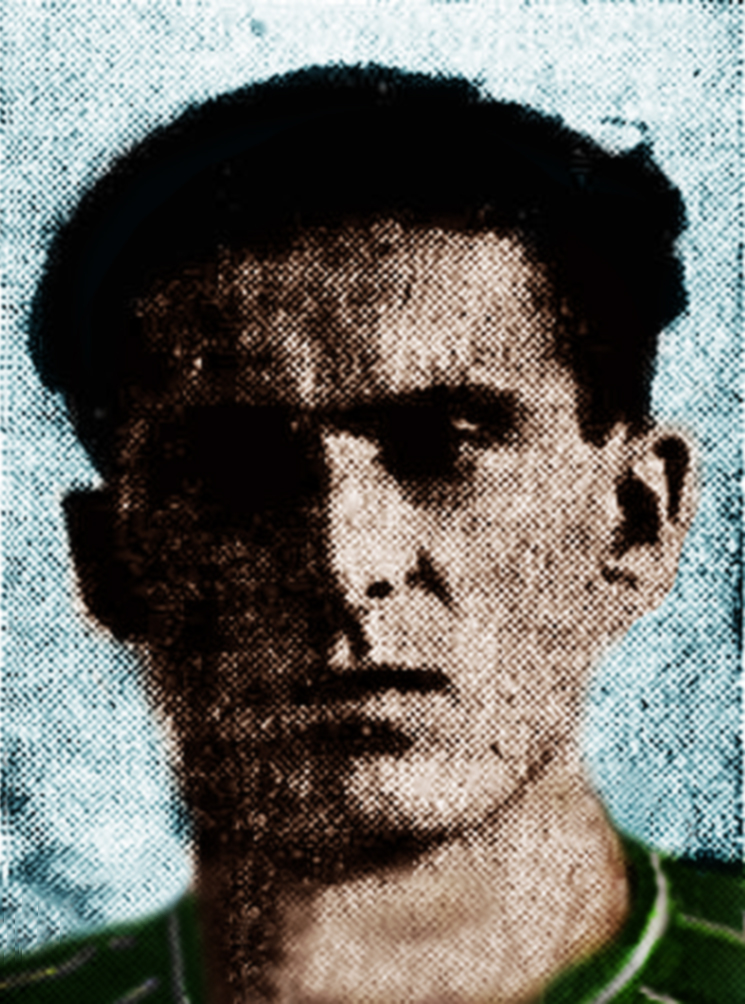

Personal information
- Date of birth: 1908
- Date of death: 28 February 1956 (aged 47–48)
- Place of death: Athens, Greece
- Position: Forward

Senior career*
Years	Team	Apps	(Gls)
- Ethnikos Piraeus
1927–1931	Panathinaikos		

International career
1930–1931	Greece	3	(4)
- * Club domestic league appearances and goals

Antonis Tsolinas (Greek: Αντώνης Τσολίνας; 1908 – 28 February 1956) was a Greek footballer who played for Ethnikos Piraeus and Panathinaikos. He featured three times for the Greece national football team between 1930 and 1931, scoring four goals.

== Career statistics ==
=== International ===
Appearances and goals by national team and year
National team	Year	Apps	Goals
Greece	1930	1	4
Greece	1931	2	0
Total		3	4

=== International goals ===
Scores and results list Greece's goal tally first, score column indicates score after each Greece goal.

List of international goals scored by Antonis Tsolinas
No.	Date	Venue	Opponent	Score	Result	Competition
1	7 December 1930	Leoforos Alexandras Stadium, Athens, Greece	Bulgaria	1–0	6–1	1929–31 Balkan Cup
2	7 December 1930	Leoforos Alexandras Stadium, Athens, Greece	Bulgaria	4–0	6–1	1929–31 Balkan Cup
3	7 December 1930	Leoforos Alexandras Stadium, Athens, Greece	Bulgaria	5–0	6–1	1929–31 Balkan Cup
4	7 December 1930	Leoforos Alexandras Stadium, Athens, Greece	Bulgaria	6–1	6–1	1929–31 Balkan Cup
