= List of diplomatic missions of Cyprus =

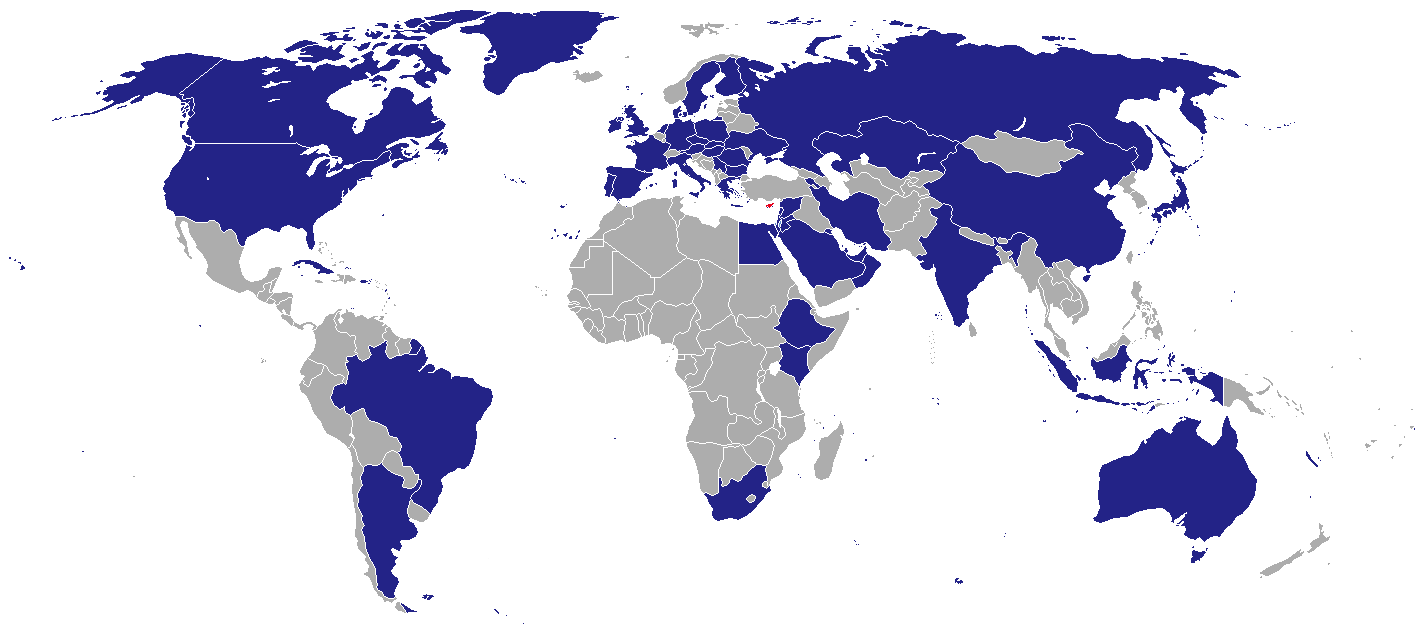
Diplomatic missions of Cyprus

The Republic of Cyprus has a modest diplomatic presence. Most of its missions are located in fellow member-states of the European Union, and in the Middle Eastern countries, with which it shares historic and cultural linkages.

The unrecognized state of Northern Cyprus, also known as the Turkish Republic of Northern Cyprus, has its own diplomatic missions, albeit only to Turkey, the sole country that recognizes it. Cyprus itself does not have a diplomatic presence in Turkey.

Honorary consulates are excluded from this listing.

== Current missions ==
=== Africa ===
Host country	Host city	Mission	Concurrent accreditation	Ref.
Egypt	Cairo	Embassy	Countries: Ghana; Mali; South Sudan; Sudan	
Ethiopia	Addis Ababa	Embassy		
Kenya	Nairobi	High Commission	Countries: Burundi; Congo-Kinshasa; Seychelles; Tanzania; Uganda; International Organizations: United Nations; United Nations Environment Programme; United Nations Human Settlements Programme	
South Africa	Pretoria	High Commission	Countries: Botswana; Eswatini; Lesotho; Madagascar; Malawi; Mauritius; Mozambique; Namibia; Zambia; Zimbabwe	

=== Americas ===
Host country	Host city	Mission	Concurrent accreditation	Ref.
Argentina	Buenos Aires	Embassy	Countries: Chile; Paraguay; Peru	
Brazil	Brasília	Embassy	Countries: Belize; Bolivia; Guyana; Uruguay	
Canada	Ottawa	High Commission	International Organizations: International Civil Aviation Organization	
Cuba	Havana	Embassy		
United States	Washington, D.C.	Embassy	Countries: Bahamas; Barbados; International Organizations: International Monetary Fund; Organization of American States (Note: Accredited as an observer mission.); World Bank	
United States	New York City	Consulate-General (Note: The consul-general in New York City is accredited as High Commissioner to the following Caribbean countries.)	Countries: Antigua and Barbuda; Saint Kitts and Nevis; Trinidad and Tobago	

=== Asia ===
Host country	Host city	Mission	Concurrent accreditation	Ref.
Armenia	Yerevan	Embassy		
Bahrain	Manama	Embassy		
China	Beijing	Embassy	Countries: Cambodia; Laos; Mongolia; North Korea; South Korea	
India	New Delhi	High Commission	Countries: Bangladesh; Malaysia; Maldives; Myanmar; Nepal; Sri Lanka; Thailand; Vietnam	
Indonesia	Jakarta	Embassy	Countries: Brunei; Philippines; Singapore; Timor-Leste; International Organizations: Association of Southeast Asian Nations	
Iran	Tehran	Embassy	Countries: Pakistan	
Israel	Tel Aviv	Embassy	Countries: Rwanda	
Japan	Tokyo	Embassy		
Jordan	Amman	Embassy	Countries: Iraq	
Kazakhstan	Astana	Embassy		
Kuwait	Kuwait City	Embassy		
Lebanon	Beirut	Embassy	Countries: Algeria	
Oman	Muscat	Embassy		
Palestine	Ramallah	Representative office		
Qatar	Doha	Embassy		
Saudi Arabia	Riyadh	Embassy	Countries: Yemen	
Syria	Damascus	Embassy		
United Arab Emirates	Abu Dhabi	Embassy	International Organizations: International Renewable Energy Agency	

=== Europe ===
Host country	Host city	Mission	Concurrent accreditation	Ref.
Austria	Vienna	Embassy	Countries: Croatia; Liechtenstein; Slovenia; International Organizations: OSCE; United Nations	
Bulgaria	Sofia	Embassy		
Czechia	Prague	Embassy		
Denmark	Copenhagen	Embassy	Countries: Iceland	
Finland	Helsinki	Embassy	Countries: Estonia	
France	Paris	Embassy	Countries: Monaco	
Germany	Berlin	Embassy		
Germany	Hamburg	Consulate-General		
Greece	Athens	Embassy	Countries: Albania; Georgia	
Greece	Thessaloniki	Consulate-General	Countries: Albania; Georgia	
Holy See (Note: The Cypriot Embassy to the Holy See is located outside Vatican territory in Rome.)	Rome	Embassy	Sovereign entity: Sovereign Military Order of Malta; International Organizations: Food and Agriculture Organization; International Fund for Agricultural Development; World Food Programme	
Hungary	Budapest	Embassy	Countries: Bosnia and Herzegovina	
Ireland	Dublin	Embassy		
Italy	Rome	Embassy	Countries: Malta; San Marino; Switzerland	
Netherlands	The Hague	Embassy	Countries: Belgium; Luxembourg; Suriname; International Organizations: Organisation for the Prohibition of Chemical Weapons	
Poland	Warsaw	Embassy	Countries: Lithuania	
Portugal	Lisbon	Embassy	Countries: Cape Verde; Morocco; Tunisia	
Romania	Bucharest	Embassy	Countries: Moldova	
Russia	Moscow	Embassy	Countries: Belarus; Kyrgyzstan; Tajikistan; Turkmenistan; Uzbekistan	
Russia	Krasnodar	Consulate-General	Countries: Belarus; Kyrgyzstan; Tajikistan; Turkmenistan; Uzbekistan	
Russia	Saint Petersburg	Consulate-General	Countries: Belarus; Kyrgyzstan; Tajikistan; Turkmenistan; Uzbekistan	
Russia	Yekaterinburg	Consulate-General	Countries: Belarus; Kyrgyzstan; Tajikistan; Turkmenistan; Uzbekistan	
Serbia	Belgrade	Embassy	Countries: Montenegro; North Macedonia	
Slovakia	Bratislava	Embassy		
Spain	Madrid	Embassy	International Organizations: International Olive Oil Council; World Tourism Organization	
Sweden	Stockholm	Embassy	Countries: Latvia; Norway	
Ukraine	Kyiv	Embassy		
United Kingdom	London	High Commission		

=== Oceania ===
Host country	Host city	Mission	Concurrent accreditation	Ref.
Australia	Canberra	High Commission	Countries: Fiji; Nauru; New Zealand; Papua New Guinea; Samoa; Solomon Islands; Tonga	

=== Multilateral organizations ===
Organization	Host city	Host country	Mission	Concurrent accreditation	Ref.
Council of Europe	Strasbourg	France	Permanent Mission		
European Union	Brussels	Belgium	Permanent Mission		
United Nations	New York City	United States	Permanent Mission	Countries: Guatemala	
United Nations	Geneva	Switzerland	Permanent Mission		

== Gallery ==
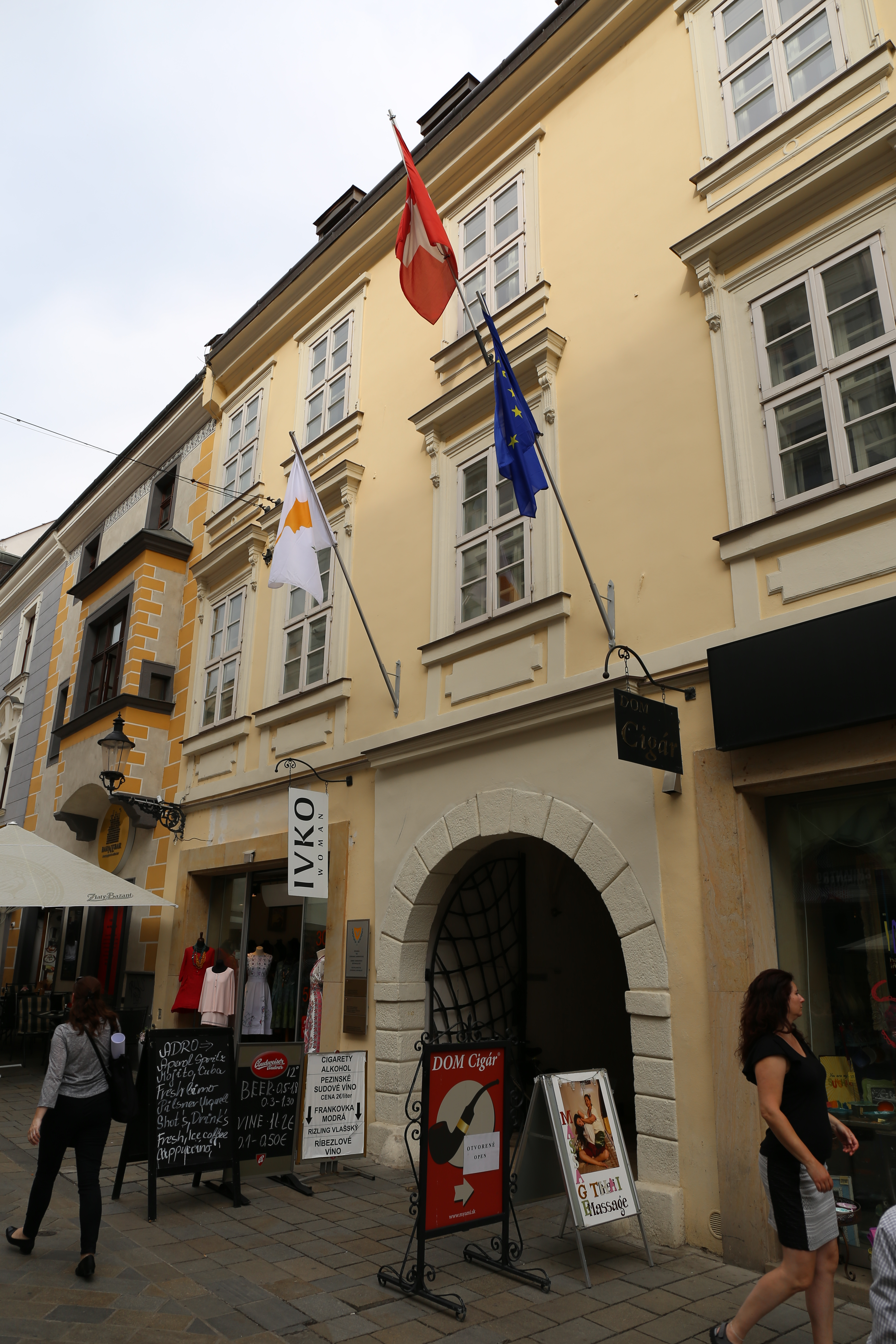
Building hosting the embassy in Bratislava

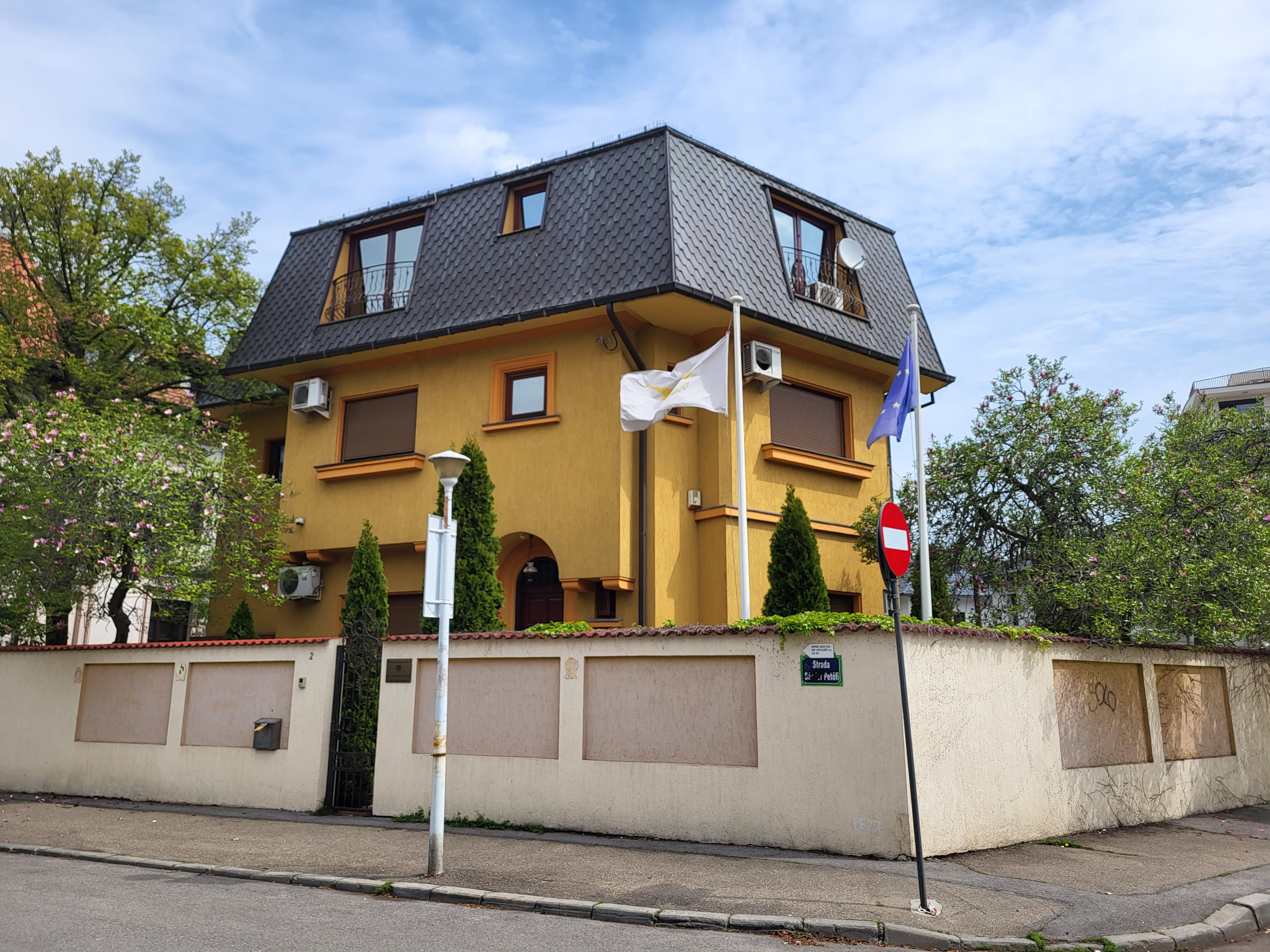
Embassy in Bucharest

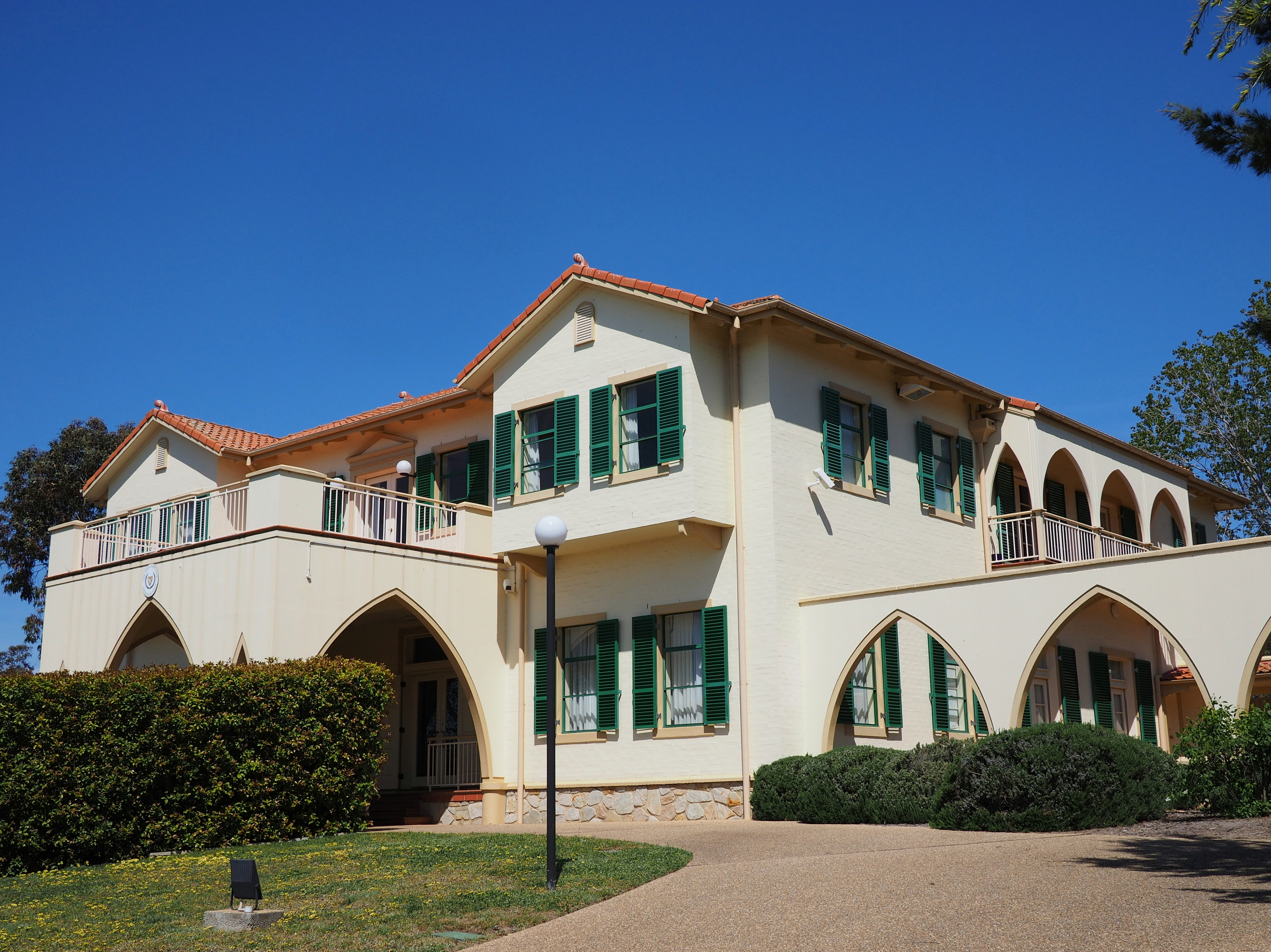
High Commission in Canberra

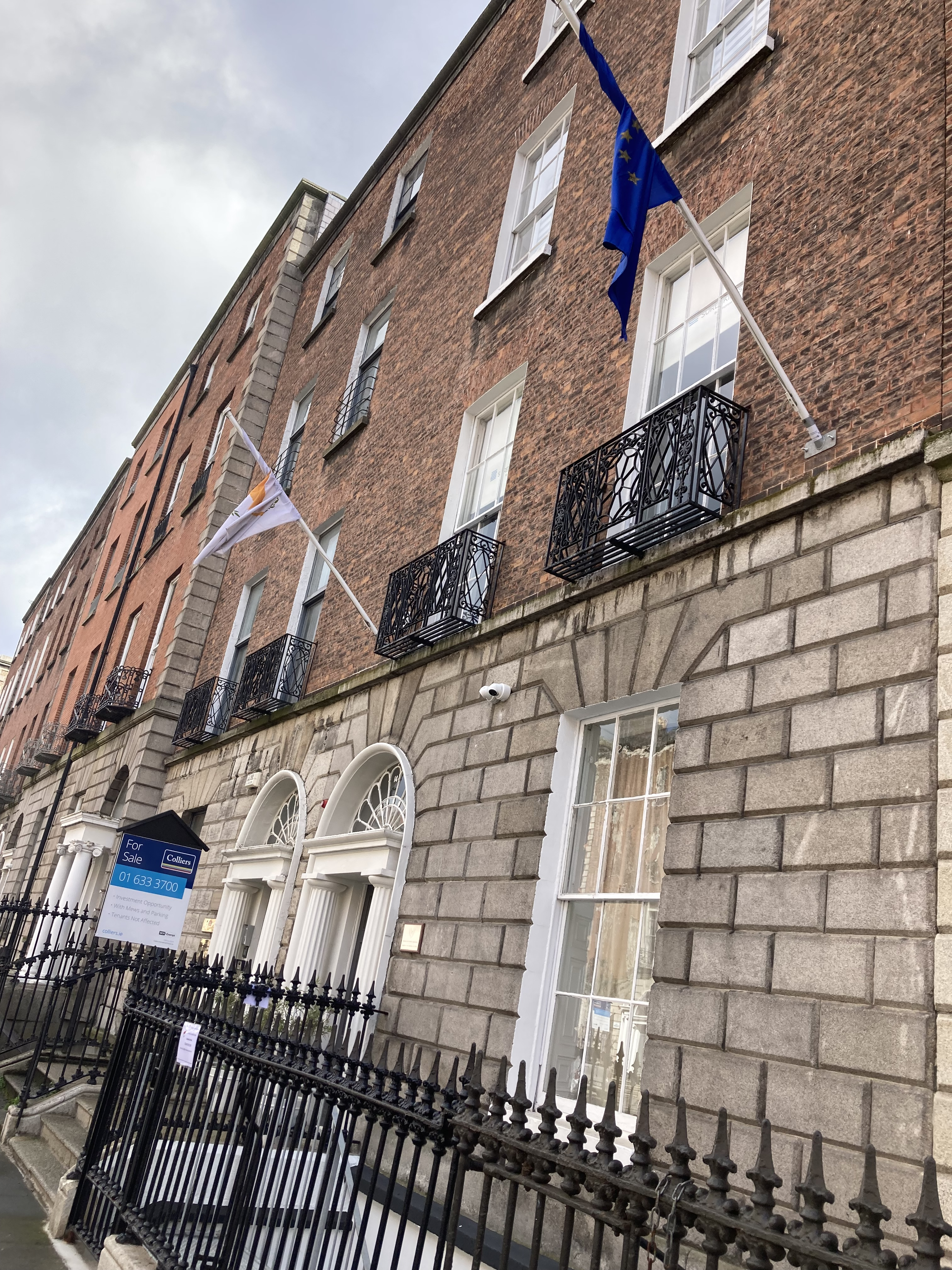
Embassy in Dublin

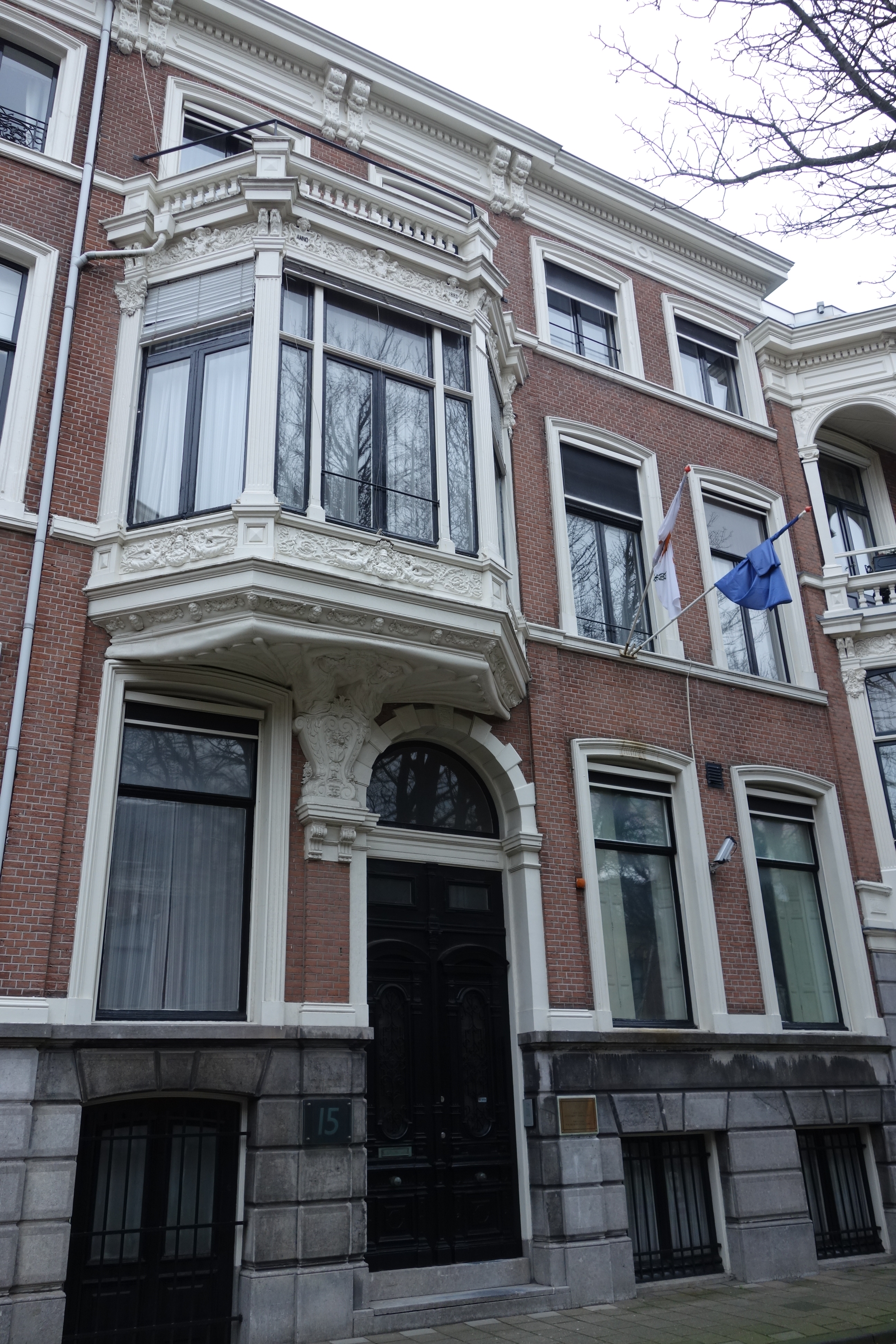
Embassy in The Hague

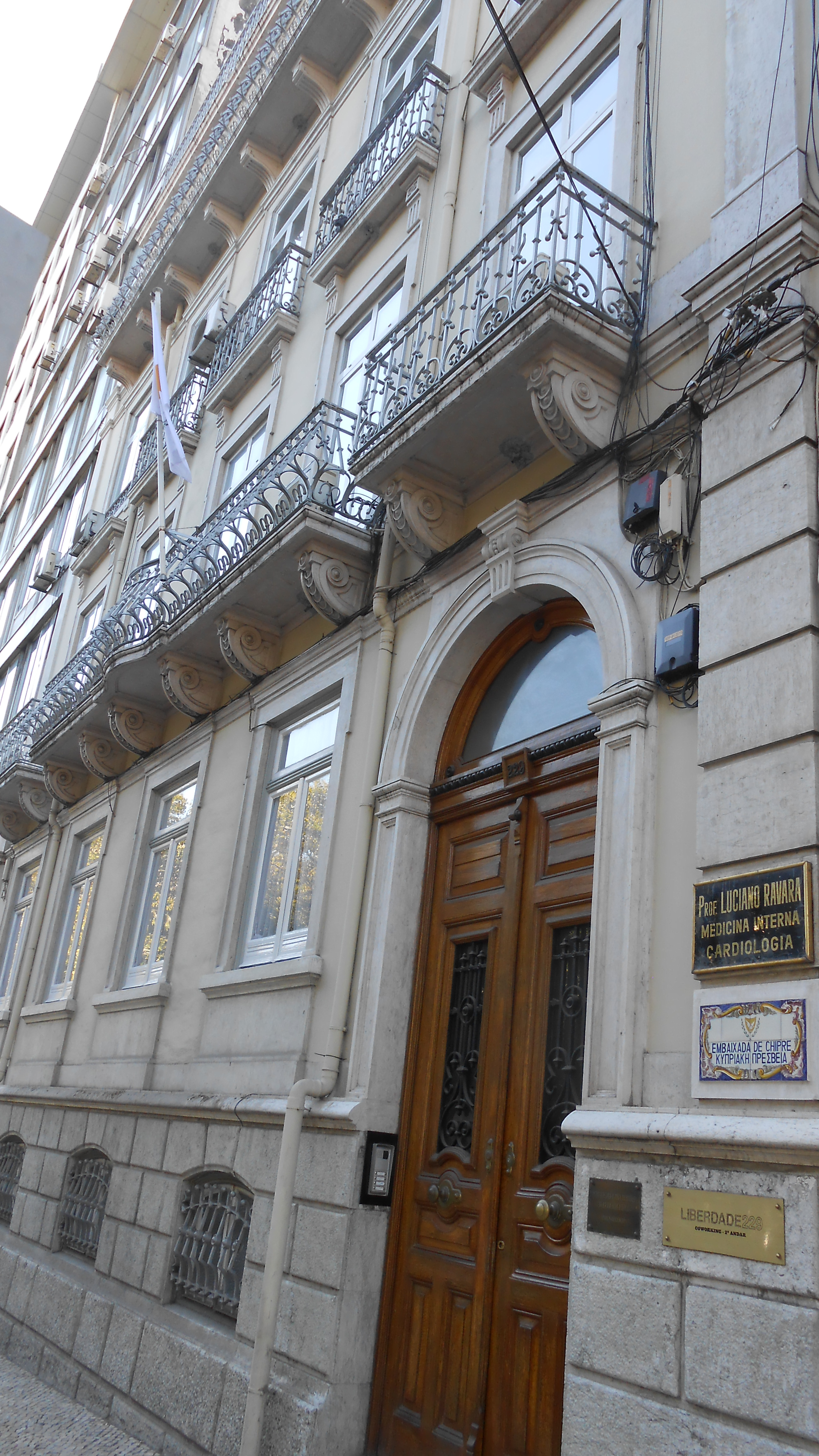
Building hosting the embassy in Lisbon

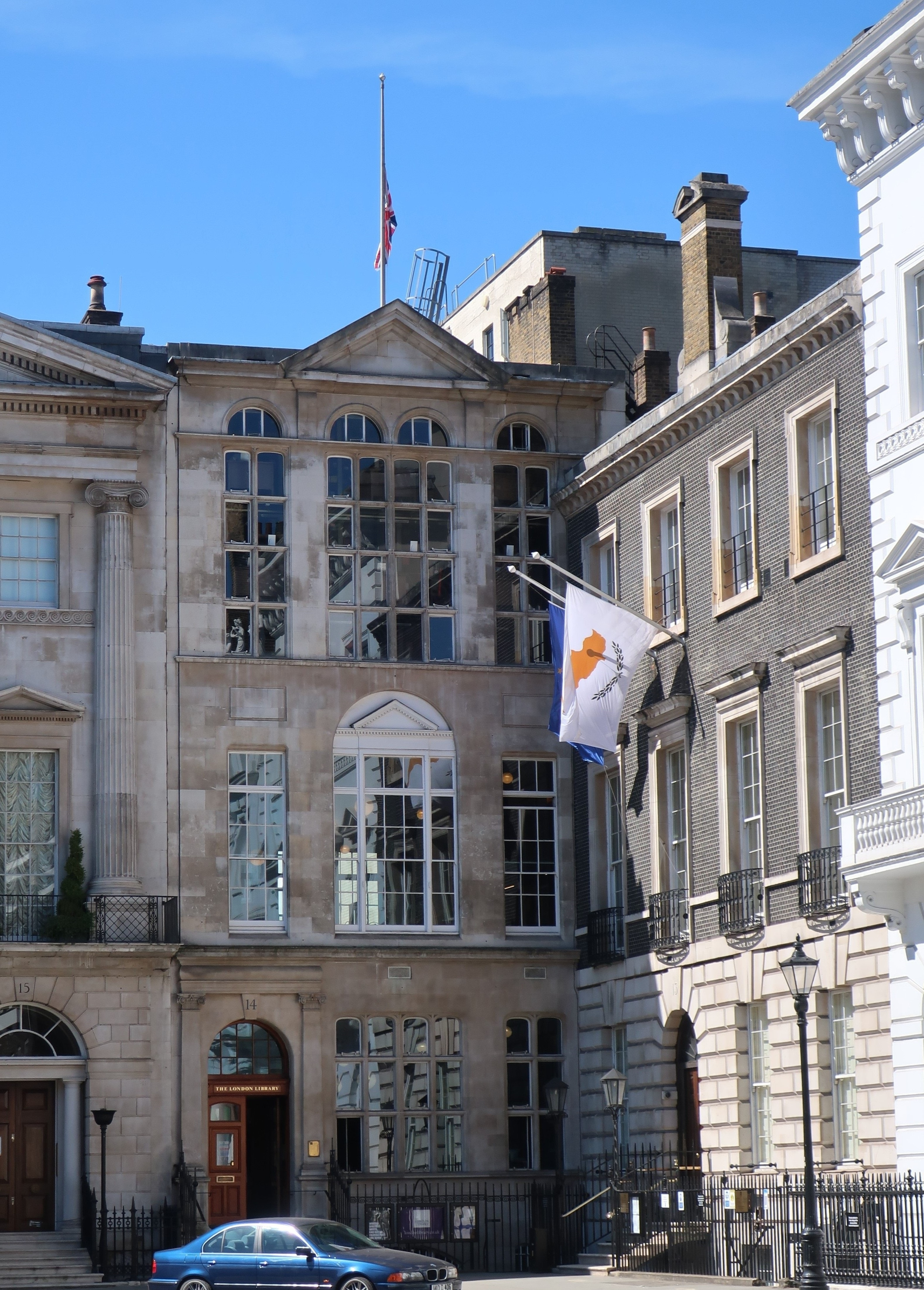
High Commission in London

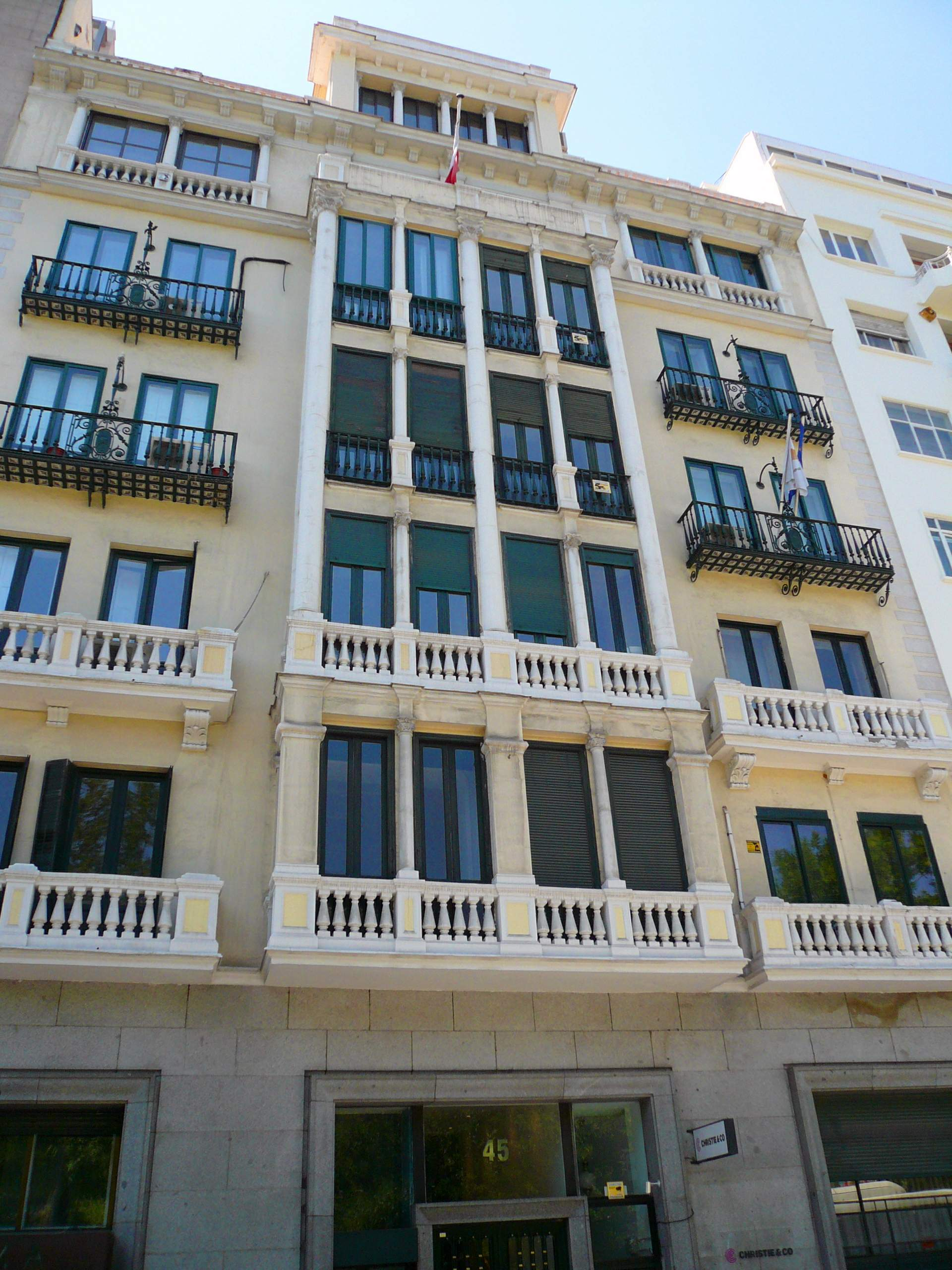
Building hosting the embassy in Madrid

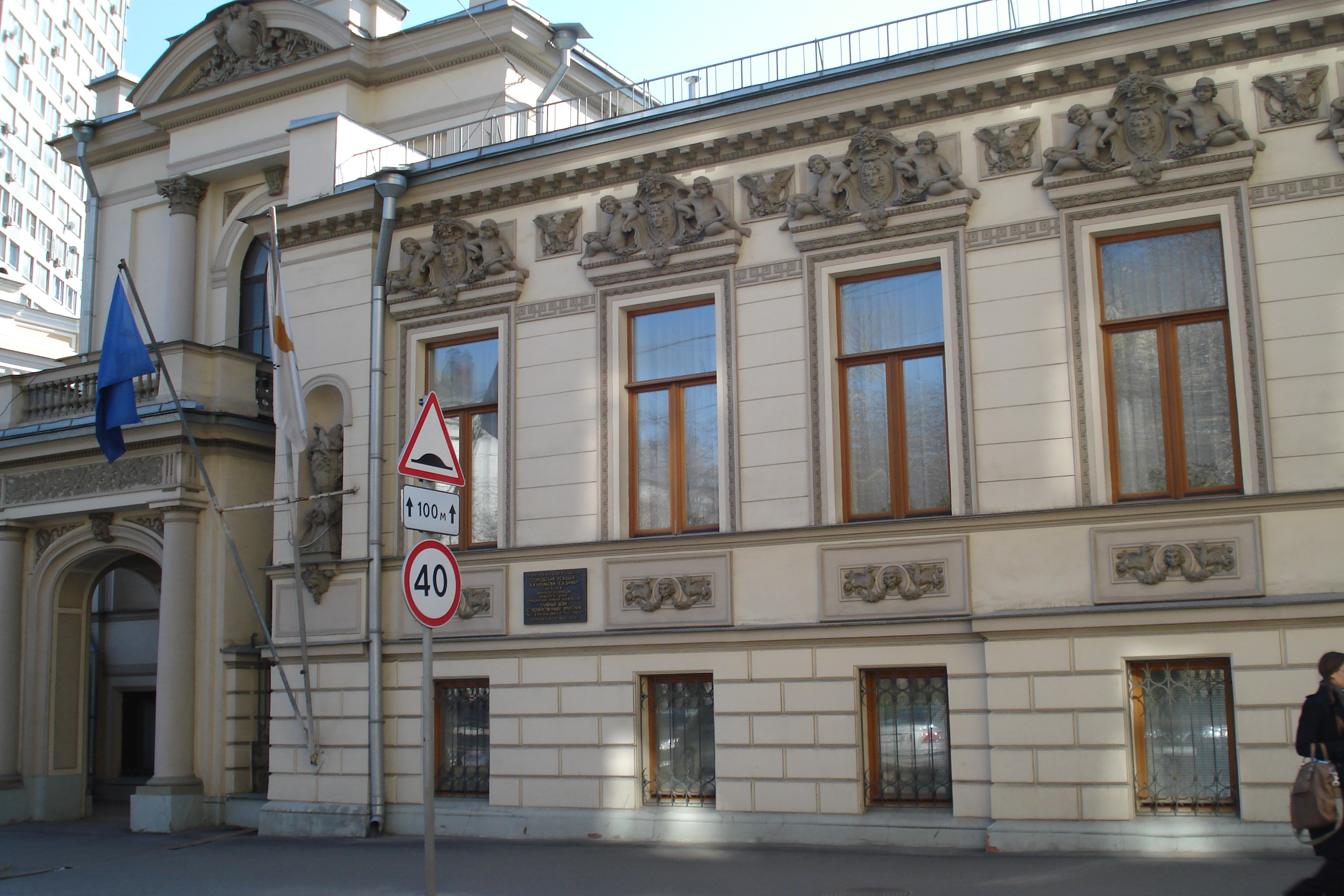
Embassy in Moscow

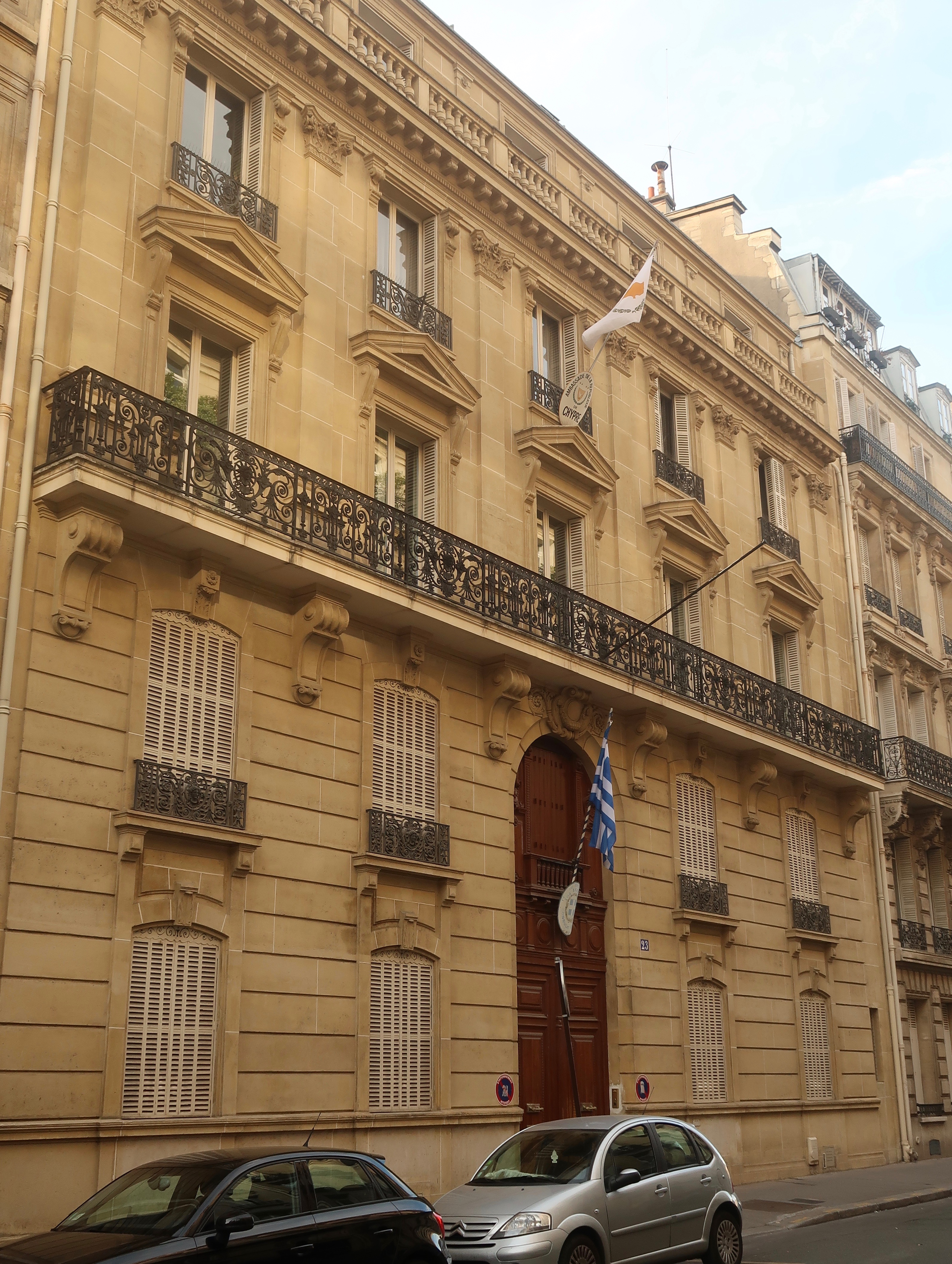
Embassy in Paris

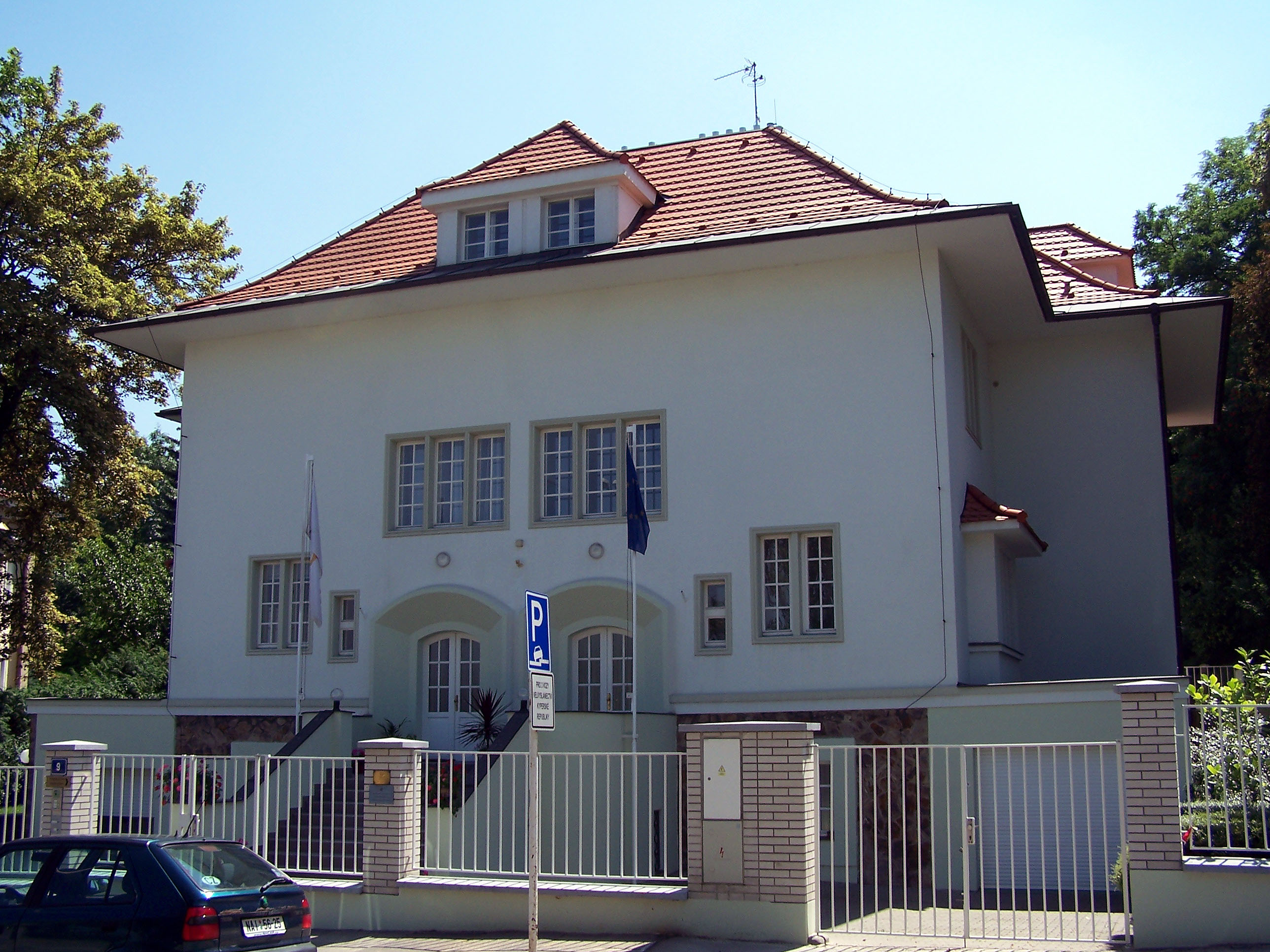
Embassy in Prague

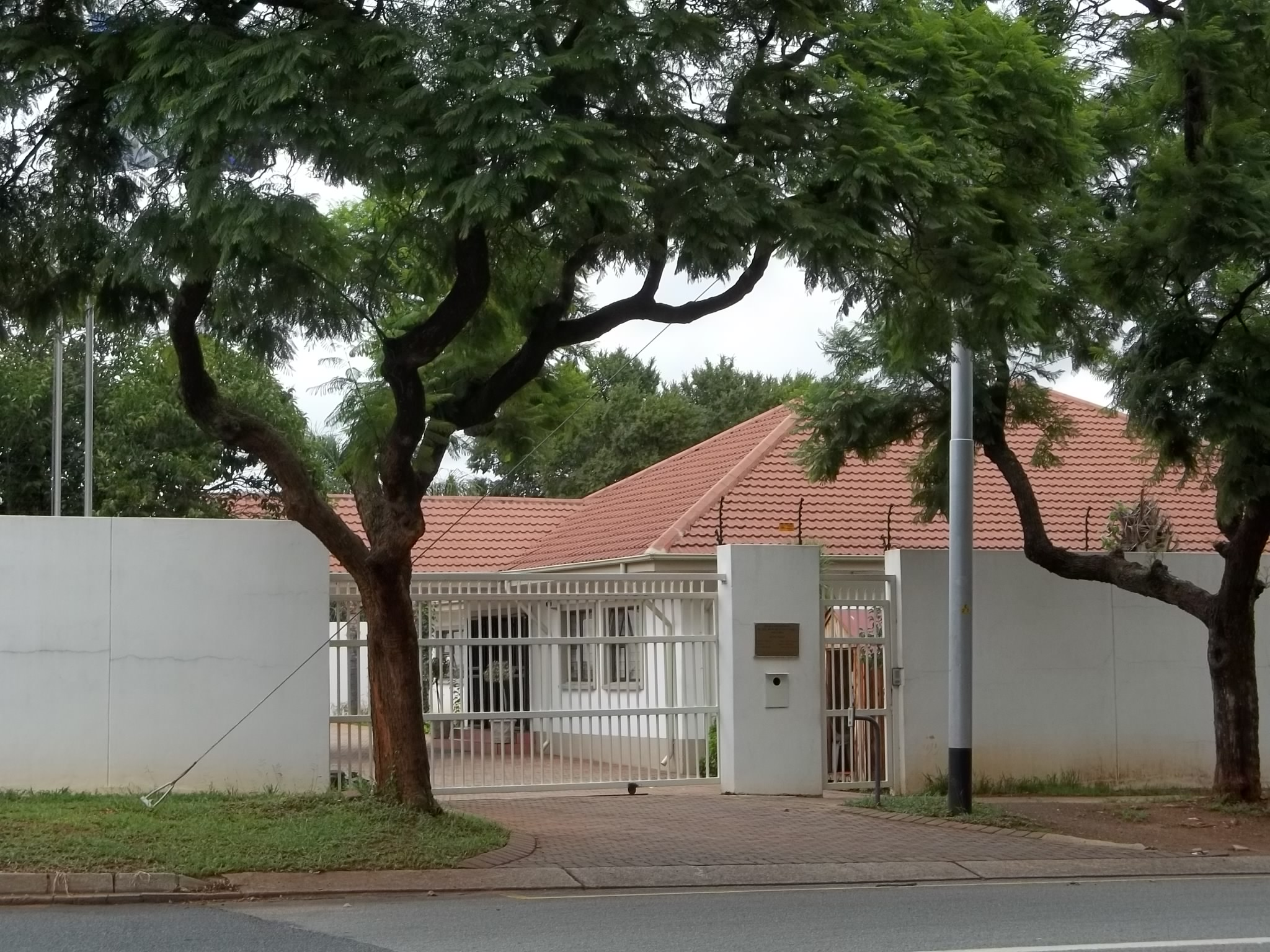
High Commission in Pretoria

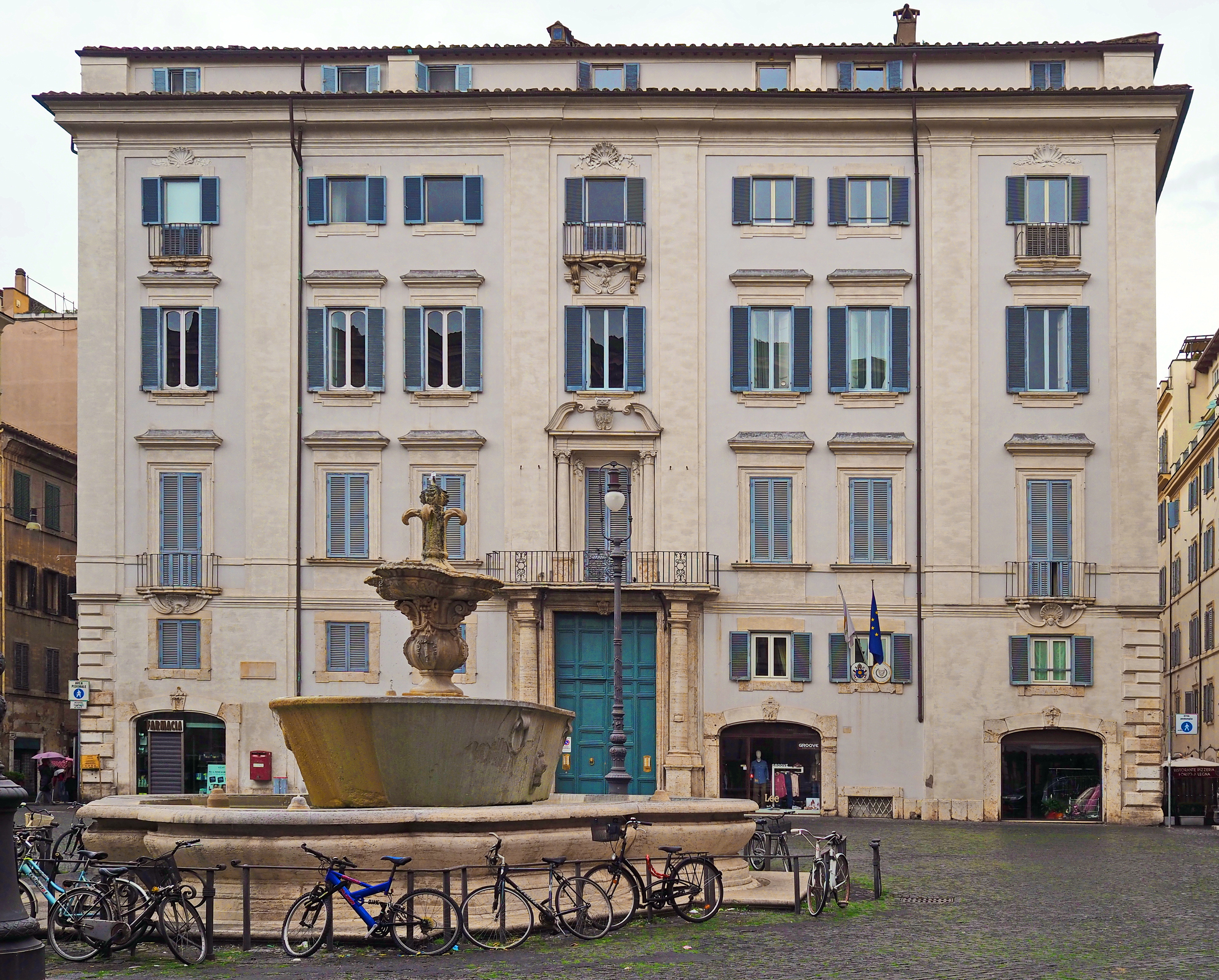
Building hosting the embassy to the Holy See in Rome

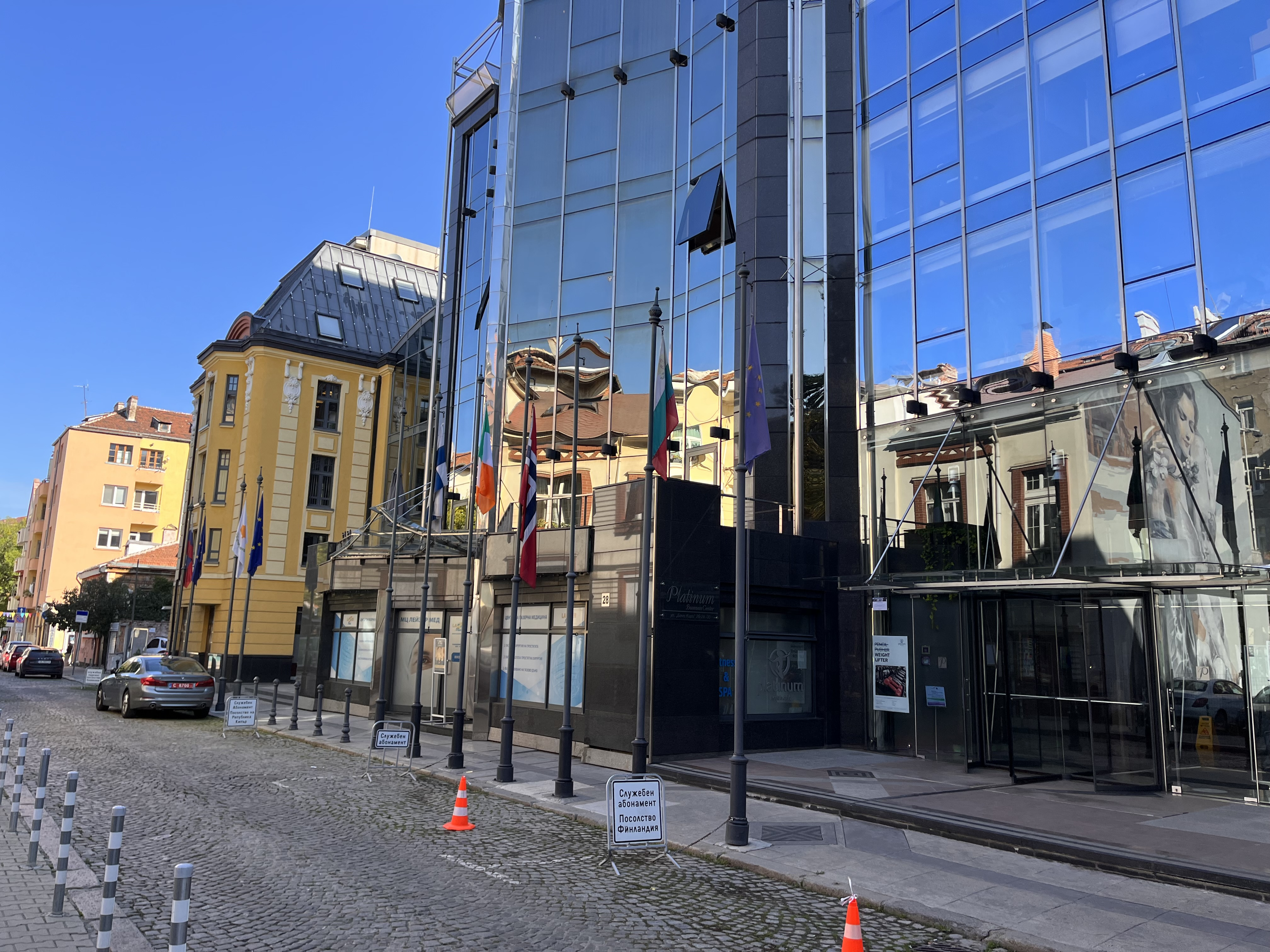
Building hosting the embassy in Sofia

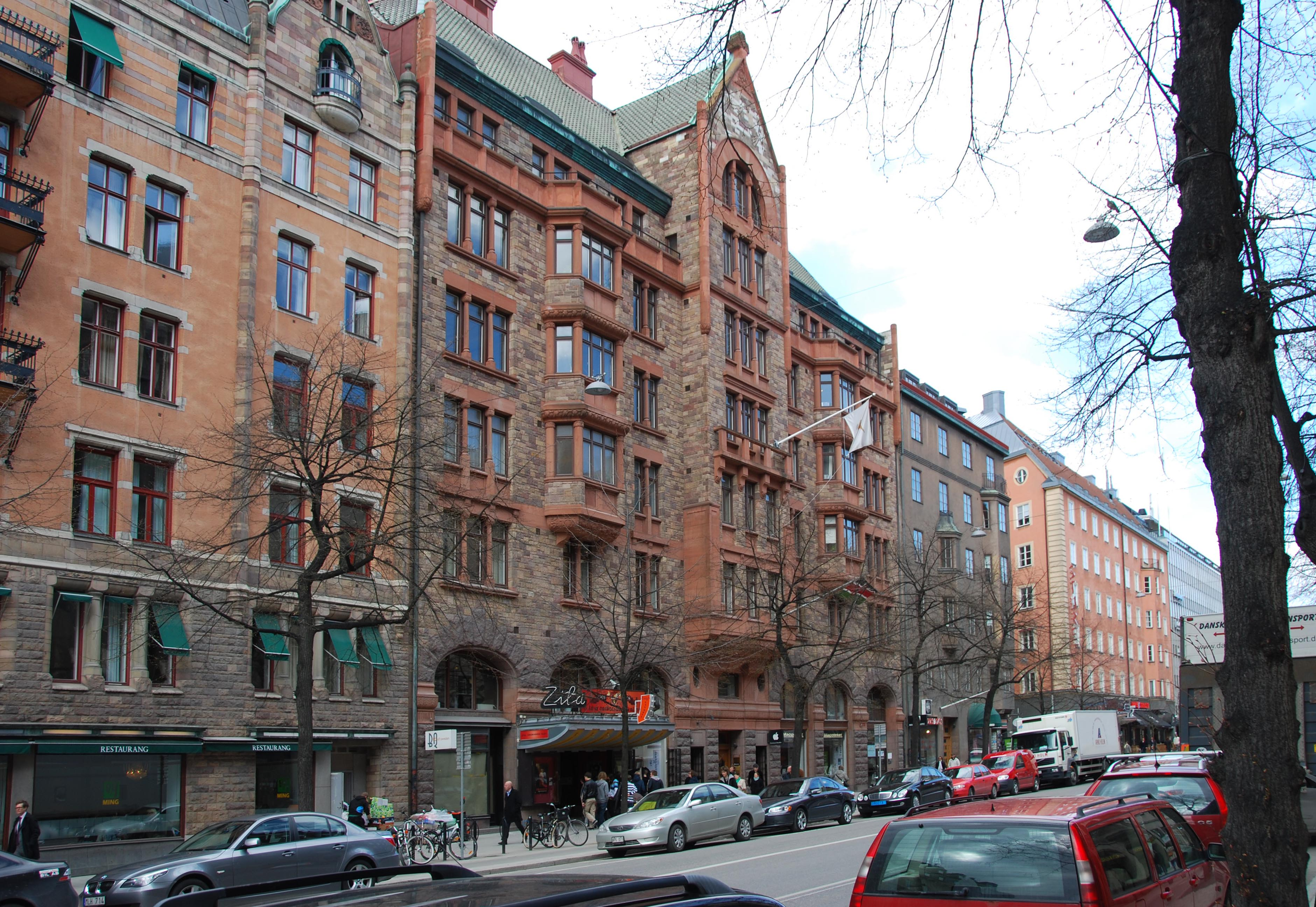
Building hosting the embassy in Stockholm

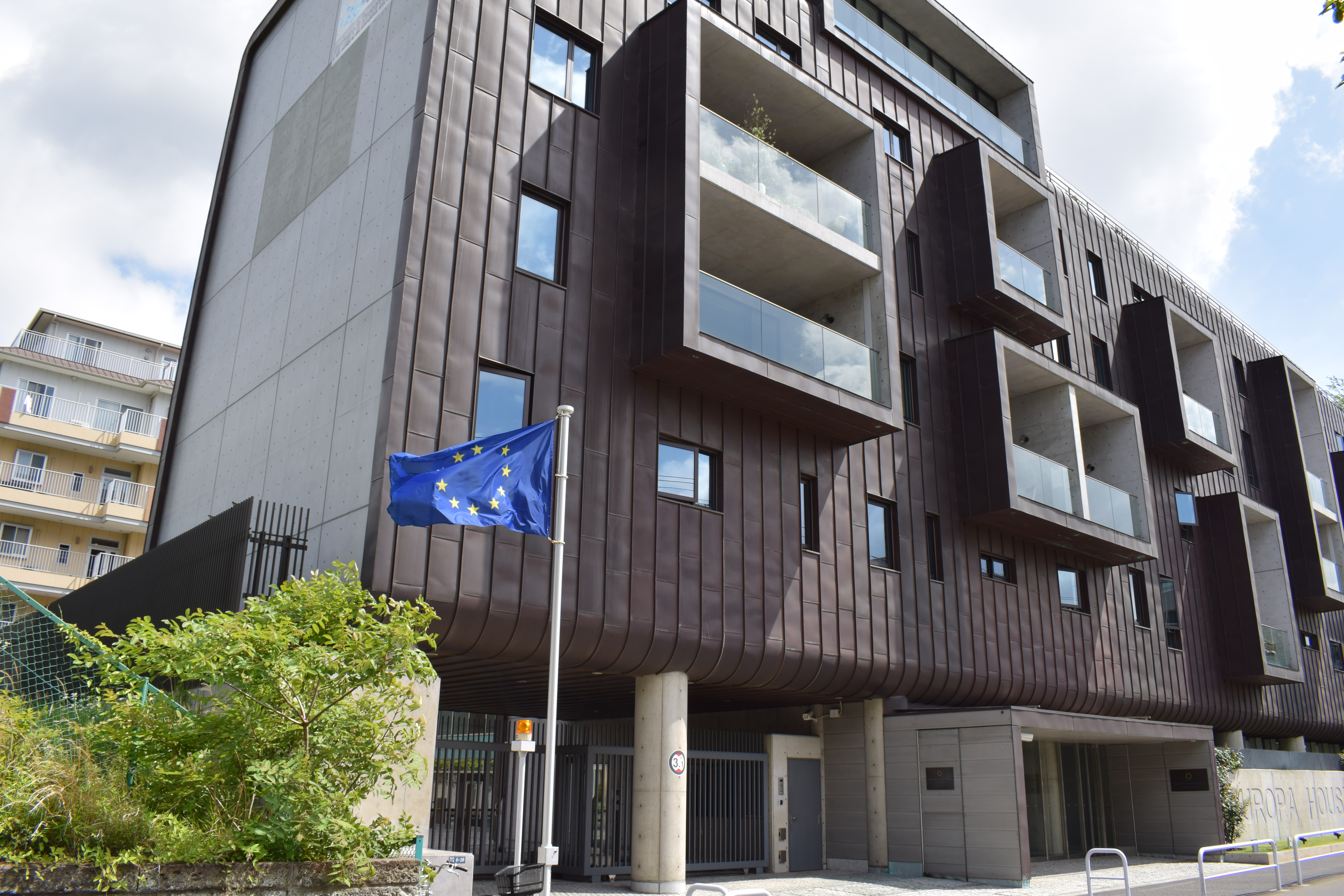
Embassy in Tokyo

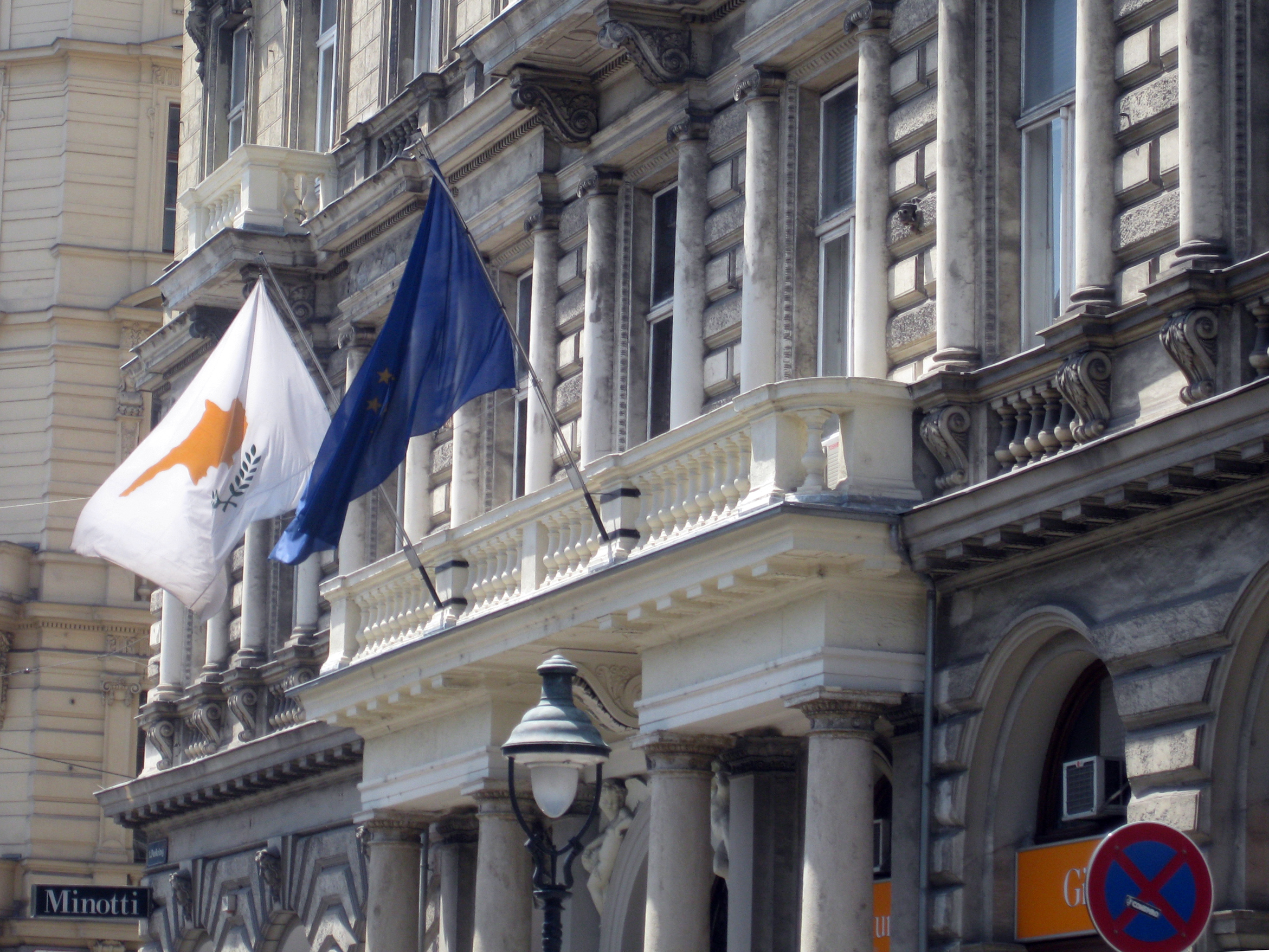
Embassy in Vienna

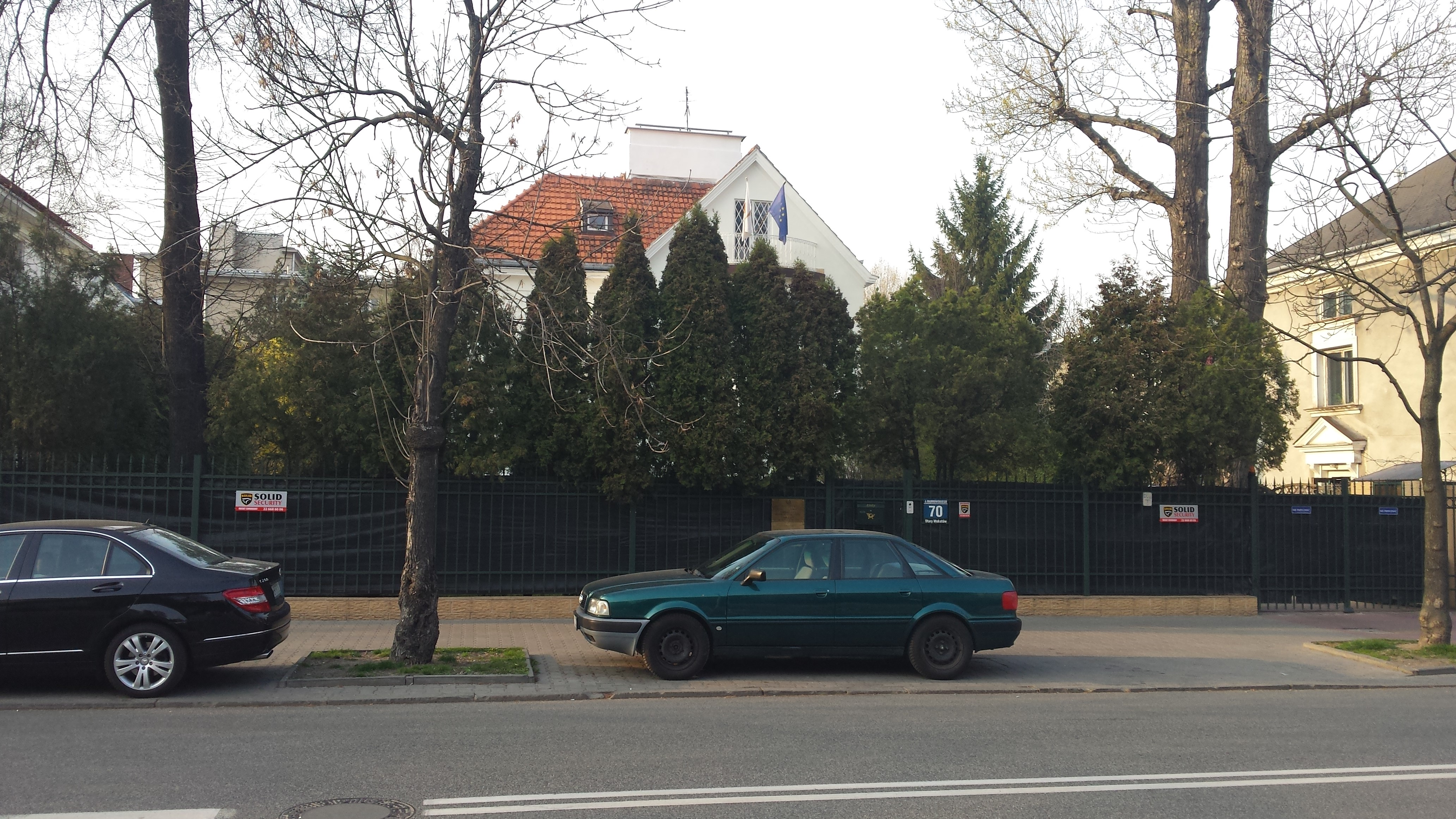
Embassy in Warsaw

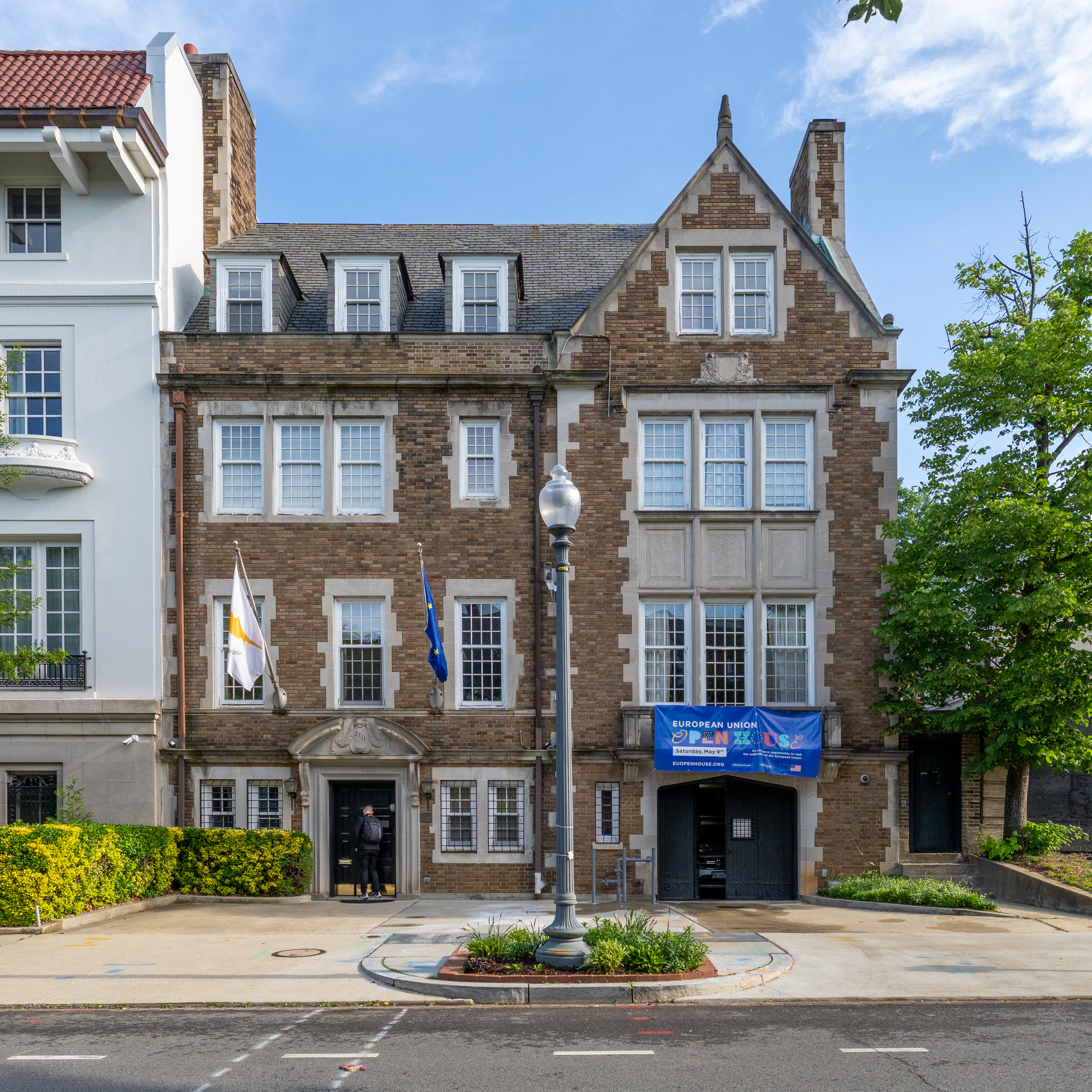
Embassy in Washington, D.C.

== Closed missions ==
=== Africa ===
Host country	Host city	Mission	Year closed	Ref.
Libya	Tripoli	Embassy	2014	

=== Americas ===
Host country	Host city	Mission	Year closed	Ref.
Mexico	Mexico City	Embassy	2020	

=== Europe ===
Host country	Host city	Mission	Year closed	Ref.
Belgium	Brussels	Embassy	2016	
Russia	Samara	Consulate-General	Unknown (Note: Most liklely closed between 2020 and 2026.)	
Slovenia	Ljubljana	Embassy	2013	

== See also ==
- Foreign relations of Cyprus
- List of diplomatic missions in Cyprus
