= Alessandro Specchi =

Italian architect and engraver

- Veduta of the Porto di Ripetta by Giuseppe Vasi, c. 1750
- Born: 9 June 1666; Rome, Papal States
- Died: 16 November 1729 (aged 63); Rome, Papal States
- Resting place: Santissime Stimmate di San Francesco
- Occupation: Architect
- Practice: Carlo Fontana
- Buildings: List: Porto di Ripetta; Palazzo Fusconi-Pighini

Alessandro Specchi (9 June 1666 – 16 November 1729) was an Italian Baroque architect and engraver.

== Biography ==
Alessandro Specchi was born in Rome on 9 June 1666, to Antonio Maria Specchi and Lucrezia Apollonia Frassinelli. He trained as an architect under Carlo Fontana. He also specialized as an engraver and made a well known series of plates for prints of vedute or views of Rome. Specchi also engraved the plates for Carlo Fontana's architectural treatise Templum Vaticanum et ipsius origo (1694), a comprehensive work documenting the history, design, and architecture of St. Peter's Basilica.

Specchi became a member of the Accademia dei Virtuosi al Pantheon in 1702 and entered the Accademia di San Luca in 1711, only to be expelled and readmitted nine years later. Early in his career, he assisted his master, Carlo Fontana, in constructing the Chapel of San Fabiano in San Sebastiano fuori le mura, commissioned by Pope Clement XI and designed by Carlo Maratta. By 1703 Specchi was Architect of the Tribunale delle Strade, and he was commissioned by Clement XI to design the Porto di Ripetta (1703–4; destr.), his most significant work of urban architecture.

The Ripetta was a docking area on the left bank of the River Tiber in the centre of Rome intended to serve the Tiber’s fertile upper reaches, which provided the city with wood, grain, oil and wine, as opposed to the Ripa Grande downstream, which served Ostia and the sea. Stone for the project was brought from the Colosseum, which had partly collapsed in an earthquake that year, and most of the construction was complete by May 1704. The port was destroyed in 1874 with the development of flood defences and the river bank road of Lungotevere, and replaced by Rome's Ponte Cavour, but its appearance is known from various sources, including photographs.

Porto di Ripetta, engraving by Piranesi, c. 1750

Specchi conceived the Ripetta as an elliptical piazza at the upper street level, which fronted on to a docking area of curving, overlapping steps merging with the Tiber and its shoreline. This part of the river bank was previously little more than a mud bank, and many cargoes had been lost, but Specchi’s plan enabled the port to function regardless of the changing height of the river – an essential requirement, since most shipments were sold from the docked boats and the goods only unloaded on purchase. The piazza in Specchi’s design was furnished with a fountain at street level serving as a visual fulcrum at the point where the Via di Ripetta, the most westerly of the three roads radiating from the Piazza del Popolo, touches the river. The flight of steps, fanning from exaggerated undulations in double S-curves at the shoreline, flattened and broadened to a span of 90 m as it ascended to street level.

The plan also gave the whole area a new focus with its broad piazza and intimate relationship between river and shore in the wavelike steps that dropped to meet the rising Tiber. The dynamism of the design is more reminiscent of the Baroque architecture of Francesco Borromini than of Specchi’s more classicizing master, Fontana, and it was echoed in two later works: although Specchi lost the competition for the Spanish Steps in 1723, the flow of his Ripetta staircase may well have influenced Francesco de Sanctis’ design, completed in 1726; and the stairs connecting the three levels of the Arcadian Academy’s Bosco Parrasio (1725) on the Janiculum, by Antonio Canevari, also reflected the curvilinearity and muscular expansion and contraction of space in the Ripetta plan.

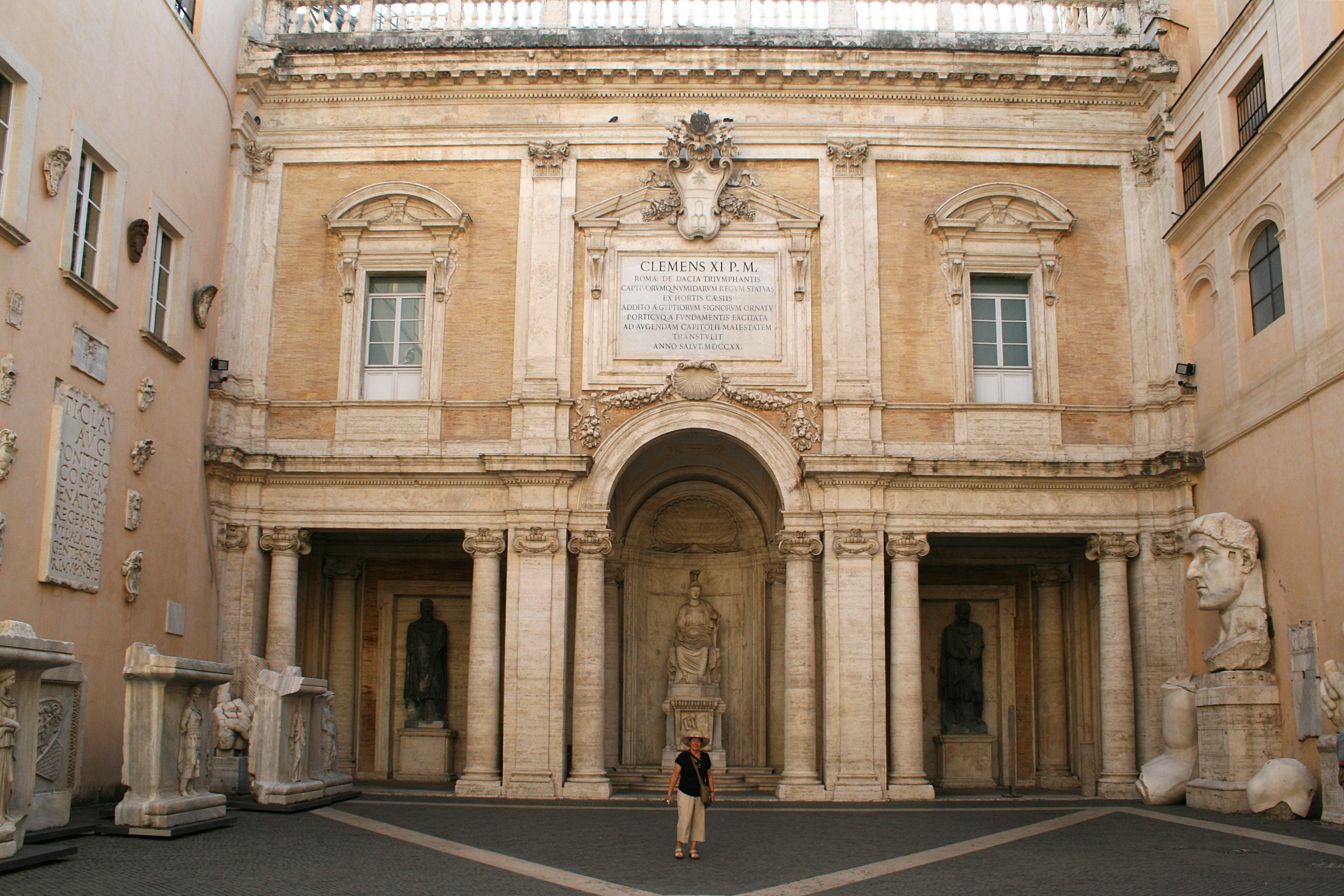
The inner portico of the Palazzo dei Conservatori

In 1710, Specchi was entrusted with the restoration of the Pantheon by cardinal Francesco del Giudice, who had been summoned by the Pope to serve as superintendent alongside his own brother, Orazio. Specchi’s work at the Pantheon involved cleaning and restoring the marble surfaces between the floor and the first entablature – an area that had already undergone partial intervention by Fontana in the 1660s. As part of a broader redevelopment plan, in 1711 Specchi designed the high altar within the central niche, the six chapels located in the peripheral niches and the aedicules between them. On 3 February 1713, Specchi succeeded Filippo Tittoni as architetto del popolo romano (architect to the Roman people). In this role, he took charge of managing and preserving Rome's ancient monuments and public works under the authority of the Capitoline Chamber (Camera Capitolina). As architetto del popolo romano, between 1719 and 1722, he was responsible for the erection of the inner portico of the Palazzo dei Conservatori, commissioned by Clement XI to house the statue of the Roma Triuphans purchased from the Cesi collection.

Palazzo Fusconi-Pighini

Specchi’s other projects in Rome included enlarging the Palazzo del Drago-Albani on the Via Quattro Fontane and rebuilding the Palazzo Fusconi-Pighini, designed by Jacopo da Vignola and built in 1524 by Baldassarre Peruzzi (1710). In 1714 Livio de Carolis bought a number of small palazzi and houses near San Marcello al Corso and asked Specchi to build the Palazzo de Carolis (1716–22; now the Banco di Roma) on the Via del Corso. The façade, like that of many small 18th-century Roman palazzi, was influenced by the elegant planar façade of Giovanni Antonio de' Rossi’s Palazzo Bonaparte, also on the Corso. A novel feature was the incorporation of Il Facchino, a 16th-century fountain in the shape of a man holding a barrel, from which spurted water; in 1872 this was moved from the Via del Corso to the Palazzo’s façade on the Via Lata. The building’s interior retains Specchi’s impressive staircase in the form of an oval spiral.

During this period, Specchi completed several significant projects, including the upper façade of Vignola's Church of Sant'Anna dei Palafrenieri and the expansion of the Ursuline Monastery on Via dei Greci (begun in 1708 and completed in 1720). However, his design for the Church of the Bambino Gesù (1708–10) was never realised due to a lack of funding. In 1721 Pope Innocent XIII appointed him Architect to the Fabric of Saint Peter, and one of his last works for the Papacy was an extension to the Quirinal Palace. Specchi died in Rome on 16 November 1729 and was buried in the Santissime Stimmate di San Francesco.
