= Meleager of Skopas =

Bronze sculpture

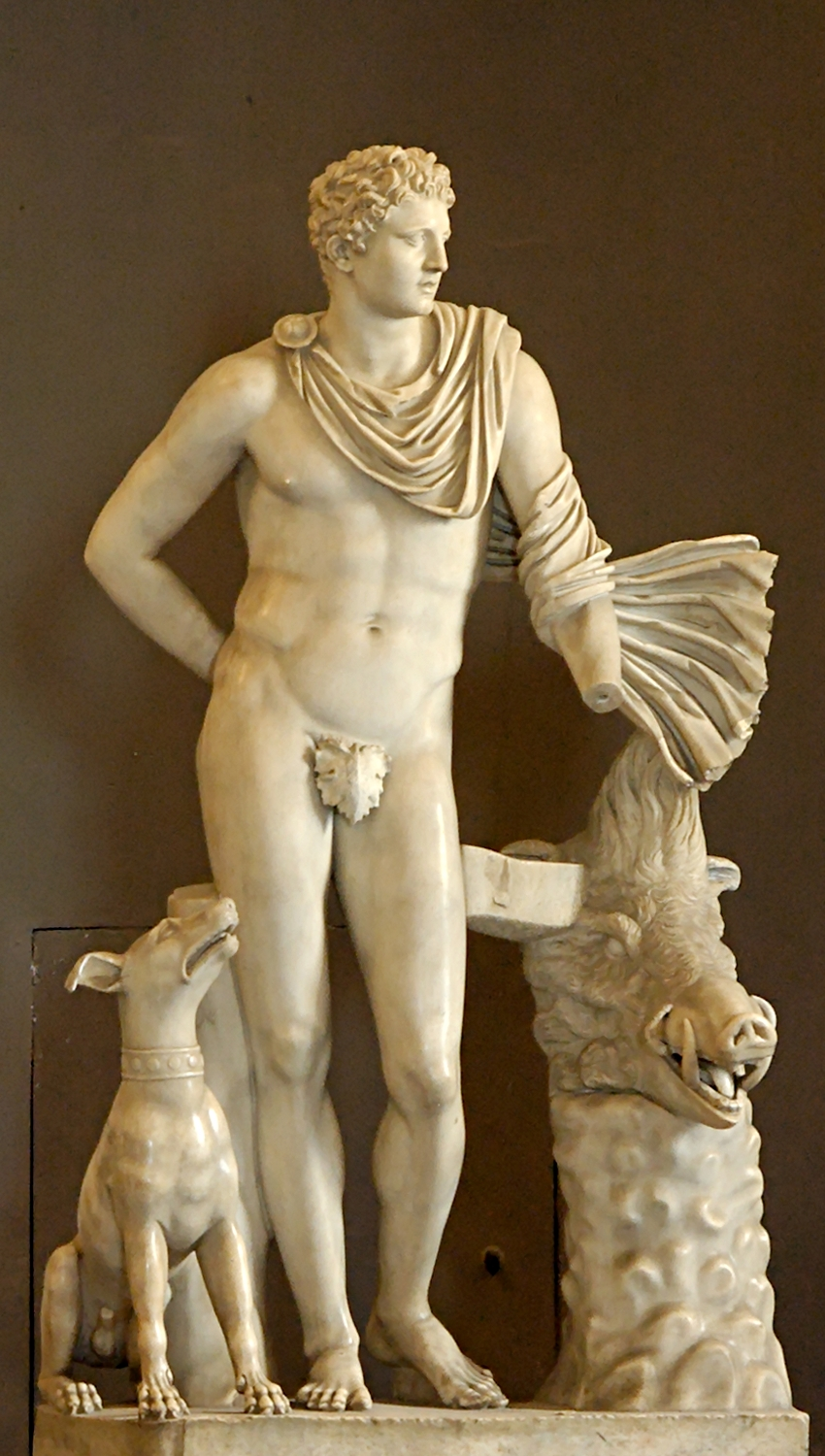
A Roman first century AD marble Meleager with chlamys, a free improvisation on Skopas's model, from the Fusconi-Pighini collection (Museo Pio-Clementino, Rome)

The Meleager of Skopas is a lost bronze sculpture of the Greek hero Meleager – host of the Calydonian boar hunt – that is associated in modern times with the fourth century BC architect and sculptor Skopas of Paros.

== History ==
In myth, the hunt of the Calydonian boar was supposed to be an initiatory event for Meleager, though it ends in his death, as well as his uncles' deaths. The sculpture escaped mention in any classical writer. It is judged to have been a late work in the sculptor's career, but it is known only through a number of copies that vary in quality and in fidelity to the original, which show it to have been one of the famous sculptures of antiquity: "the popularity of the Meleager during Roman times was certainly great," notes Brunilde Sismondo Ridgway, who reports Andrew F. Stewart's count of 13 statues, 4 torsos, 19 heads (which are similar enough to the Ludovisi Ares to raise confusions) busts and herms, a variant with changed stance and attributes, and 11 versions adapted for a portrait or a deity. Six or seven of the accepted copies are accompanied by a dog, 12 wear a chlamys, 3, clinching the sculptural type's identification with Meleager, are accompanied by a boar's head trophy, as in the Vatican Meleager (illustration, right). Ms Ridgeway accounts for the sculpture's popularity in part "by the appeal that hunting figures had for the Romans, through their heroizing connotations."

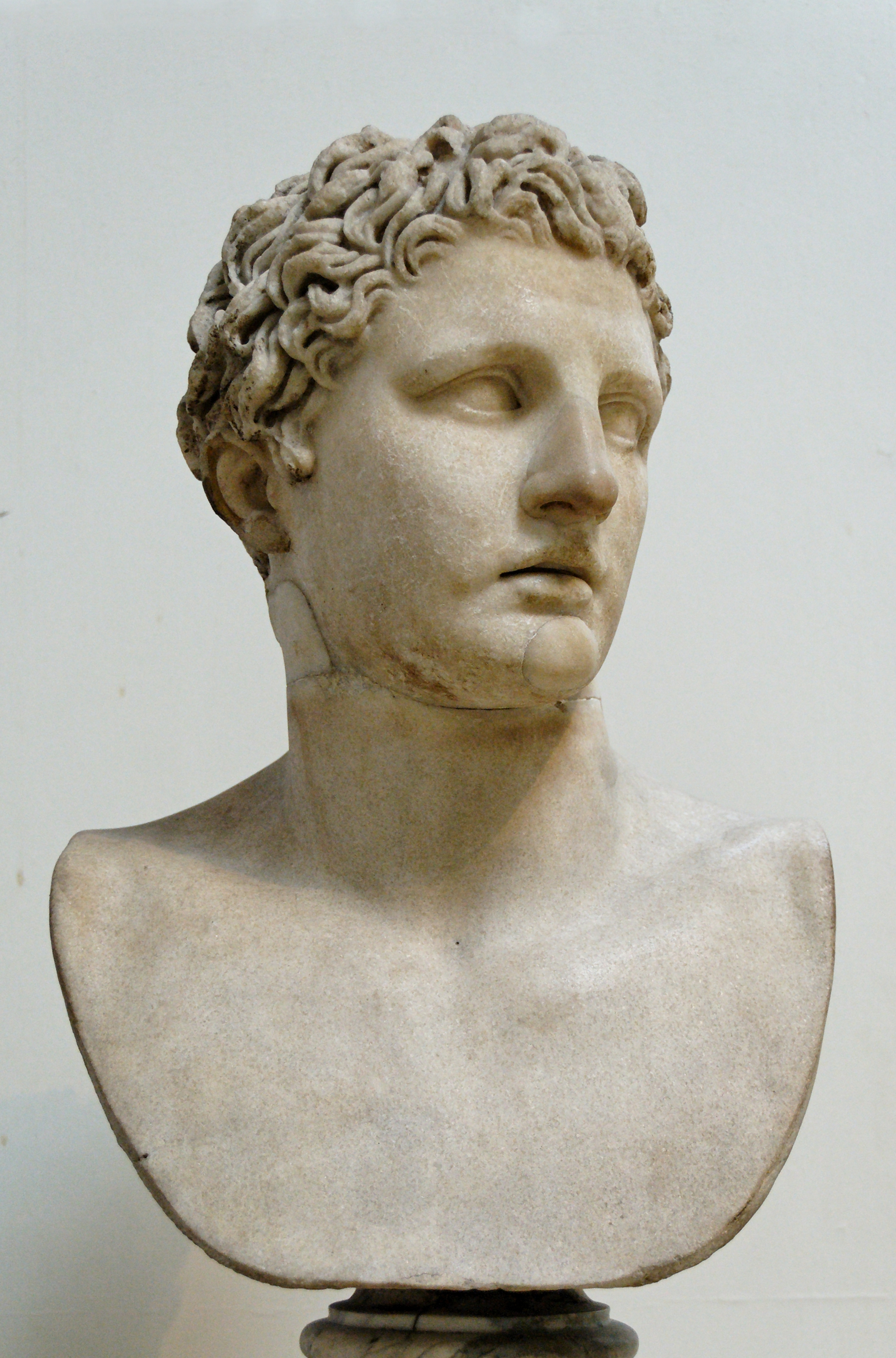
Meleager, after Skopas (British Museum)

A torso in the Fogg Art Museum, Harvard University, is rated among the superior copies, if it is indeed a Meleager. "There are other marble Meleagers," wrote Cornelius Vermeule in 1967, "one or two reaching the level of the Fogg statue but most of them documents of stonecutting devoid of the restless inner life that must have been imparted by the master to the original." Several unfinished copies found in Athens suggest that the city was a center for reproductions for the Roman market.

It is not known whether Skopas' original was carried out for the heroön at Calydon where Meleager was venerated and whether the original was carried off as a cultural trophy by one of the Romans "of taste and means".

The lifesize standing Meleager from Palazzo Fusconi-Pighini (illustration, right), sometimes identified in the 16th and 17th centuries as an Adonis, who was a victim of a boar rather than its master, was found by Ulisse Aldrovandi in a vineyard outside of Porta Portese, It was recorded in 1546 among the most beautiful in Rome, not excluding the antiquities of the Cortile del Belvedere; it was in the house of the doctor to three popes, Francesco Fusconi from Norcia, whose Roman palazzo faced Palazzo Farnese. The sculpture, which was engraved in all the anthologies of antiquities, was copied by Pierre Lepautre for Louis XIV at Marly. The original remained with Fusconi's eventual Pighini heirs until early in 1770, when it was purchased by Pope Clement XIV as one of the founding pieces for his new museum in the Vatican. It was among the select group of sculptures triumphantly removed by Napoleon to Paris, under terms of the Treaty of Tolentino (1797) but returned after Napoleon's fall.

A variant, discovered in 1838, has been conserved in the Antikensammlung Berlin since 1844. Another early Roman full-size marble copy is at the Art Institute of Chicago.

Ms Ridgeway remarks critically on the slenderness of the connection with Skopas, which is based on the subject of the east pediment of the Temple of Athena Alea at Tegea, in which Skopas was the architect, but not, as Ms Ridgeway observes, accounted directly responsible for the pediment sculptures in any classical reference: "from a narrative pedimental composition in Arkadia—related, moreover, to local families and legends—to a single free-standing sculpture, perhaps in Kalydon (a tomb monument to the hero, as suggested by Stewart?) is quite a leap of the imagination."
