= Aristander of Paros =

Ancient Greek sculptor

Aristander (Ancient Greek: Ἀρίστανδρος) of Paros was an ancient Greek sculptor.

This artist was responsible for one of the sacrificial tripods which the Lacedaemonians made out of the spoils of the Battle of Aegospotami (405 BCE), and dedicated at Amyclae. The two tripods had statues beneath them, between the feet: that of Aristander had Sparta holding a lyre; that of Polykleitos had a figure of Aphrodite. His son was the celebrated sculptor Scopas.
