= Oblate Sisters of the Holy Child Jesus =

The Church of the Bambino Gesù on Esquiline Hill, attached to the General Motherhouse of the congregation

The Oblate Sisters of the Holy Child Jesus (Italian: Suore Oblate del Santo Bambino Gesù) are the members of a religious congregation of women founded in the 17th century, dedicated to the education and religious formation of poor girls. They use the suffix O.B.G. after their names.

== History ==
=== Foundation ===
The Sisters were founded in Rome through the inspiration of Father Cosimo Berlinsani, O.M.D. (1619–1694), together with Mother Anna Moroni (1613–1675). The priest had recently been appointed pastor of the Basilica Church of Santa Maria in Campitelli. In the course of his pastoral care, he found that many of the girls who came to him to make their First Communion had little or no knowledge of the Catholic faith. He asked Moroni, for whom he served as confessor, to teach some of these girls.

In 1650 Moroni began to dedicate herself to the work of re-educating female victims of prostitution, shortly afterwards setting up a school to teach young girls the catechism and in 1667 receiving authorisation from the Vicar General of Rome to open a boarding house for her students.

In 1671, Moroni and 12 of the students from the school, who had become her assistants, decided to form a religious community, taking the name of the Boarding School Community (Italian: Convittrici) of the Most Holy Child Jesus, based on a favorite devotion of Moroni. They then elected her their leader. The members of the small community all made a vow of perseverance on 2 July 1672, thereby formally establishing themselves as a lay religious society.

The women initially took as their religious habit a brown tunic, in honor of Our Lady of Mount Carmel, with a woolen belt and a black, ankle-length veil. They established a limit of 33 members for their community, based on the traditional lifespan of Christ.

=== Expansion ===
The members of the community then formed a life combining adoration of the Blessed Sacrament with the service to the students of the school. New schools under their direction began to be established outside of Rome. A Rule of Life was drawn for them between 1680 and 1684, which received final approval from Cardinal Gasparo Carpegna in 1693, under his authority as the Cardinal Priest of Santa Maria in Campitelli, to which they were still attached. New schools of the congregation began to be founded outside of Rome: Spoleto (1683), San Severino (1693) and Rieti (1693). Not long after, though, Cardinal Lorenzo Corsini, who was their Cardinal Protector, persuaded them to adopt the Rule of St. Augustine, at which time they changed the name of the community to the Augustinian Oblates of the Most Holy Child.

The following century saw continued growth of the congregation. In 1708 the community in Rome moved from their original site to the one they still have as their motherhouse, adjacent to the Basilica of Santa Maria Maggiore. The historic Church of the Bambin Gesù was built for them there during the 1730s. Additional schools of the congregation were established: Ascoli Piceno (1701), Fermo (1717), Sezze (1717) and Palestrina (1722). During the 19th century, due to their status as laywomen, not nuns, the members of the congregation and their schools were able to escape the closing of religious communities mandated by the Napoleonic Kingdom of Italy. A school was founded in Gualdo Tadino in 1817.

== Modern era ==
For the first 250 years of the congregation's existence, each community of Oblates had been completely autonomous, and they lived under the canonical status of a society of common life, not taking religious vows. In 1917, the Catholic Church issued its first universal code of canon law, which recognized for the first time women living in religious communities, that were not part of an enclosed religious order, as leading a consecrated life. In 1926 the Oblates voted to seek the status of a religious congregation, uniting themselves all under one central administration. Two years later, in 1928, they were allowed to profess vows as Religious Sisters. At that time they changed the name of the congregation to the one they currently use.

This period saw a new spurt of growth of the congregation within Italy: Sorrento (1916), Giulianova (1931), Montone (1936), Roseto degli Abruzzi (1936) and Tortoreto (1946). In response to a general request by the pope issued to all religious orders, the Sisters began to serve in South America, opening schools in Brazil and Peru.
