= Palazzo Fusconi-Pighini =

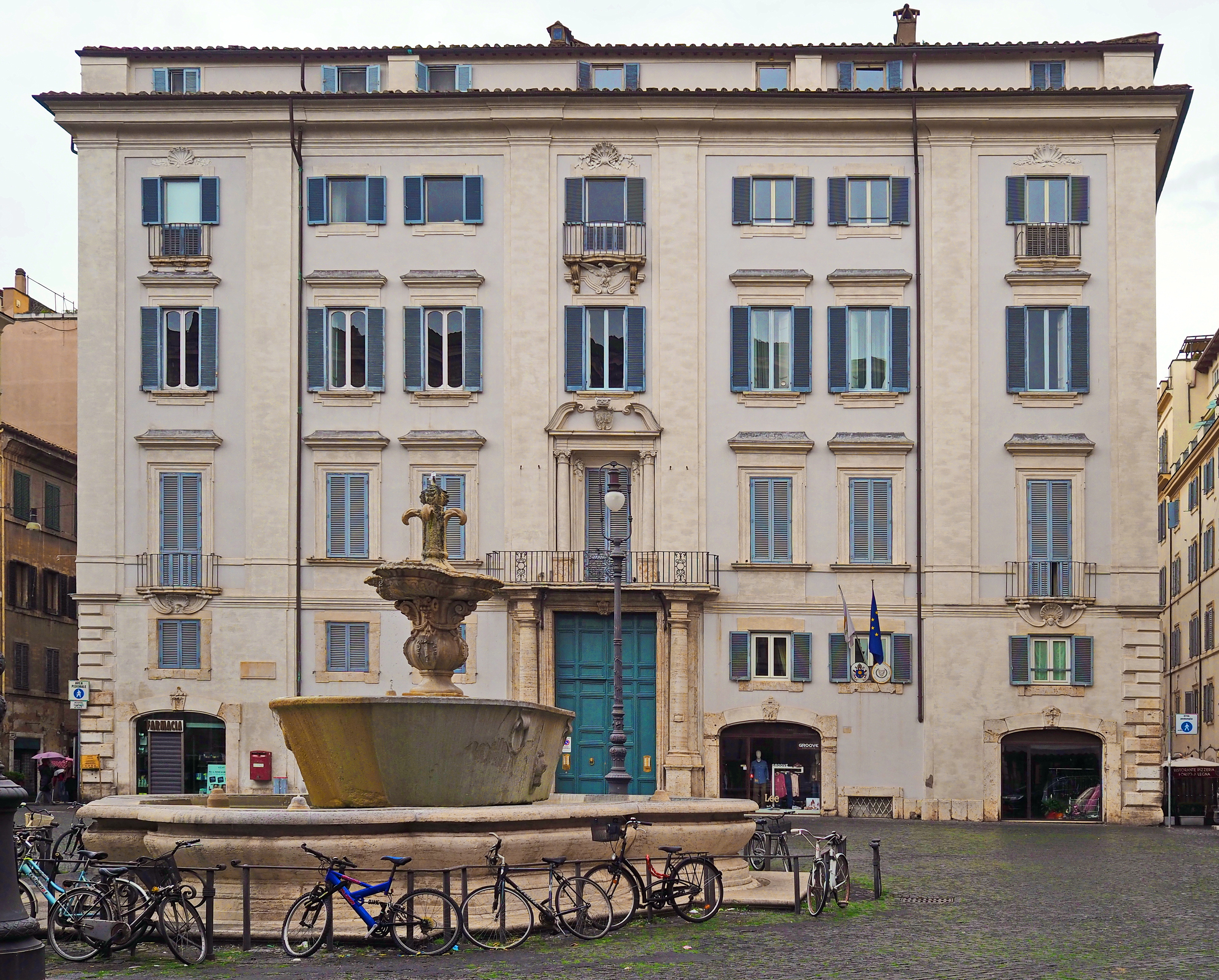
- Palace Facade
- Click on the map for a fullscreen view

General information
- Architectural style: Renaissance
- Location: Rome, Italy
- Coordinates: 41°54′N 12°28′E

The Palazzo Fusconi-Pighini is a Renaissance-style palace located on Piazza Farnese #44 in the rione Regola of central Rome, Italy.

== Use ==
The 16th-century palace also goes by the name of Pighini or Gallo di Roccagiovine. Today the palace houses various offices including the embassy of Cyprus.

== Description ==
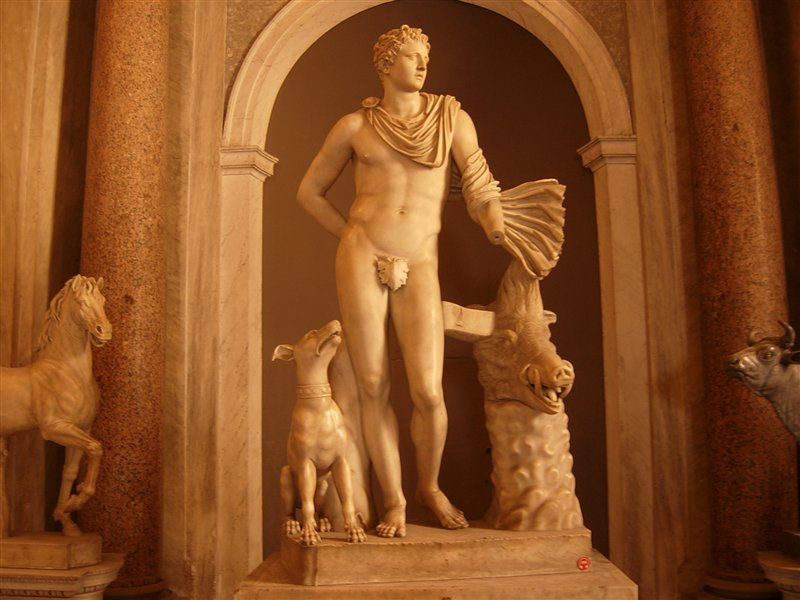
Meleager and the Calydon Boar

Originally a palace at this site was designed by Jacopo da Vignola and built in 1524 by Baldassarre Peruzzi on behalf of Francesco Fusconi from Norcia. From there it was inherited in 1554 by Adriano Fusconi, bishop of Aquino, who then passed it on to descendants of his family, the Pighini. In the early 18th-century (1705), the palace was enlarged by Alessandro Pighini with the aid of the architect Alessandro Specchi. Specchi added the scenographic staircase.

The Pighini accumulated a select collection of ancient statuary, including Meleager and the Calydon Boar, a Roman copy of a Greek original attributed to Skopas. The statue was found by Ulisse Aldrovandi in a vineyard outside of Porta Portese, and is now part of the Museo Pio-Clementino in the Vatican.

Preceded by Palazzo Farnese	Landmarks of Rome; Palazzo Fusconi-Pighini	Succeeded by Palazzo Giustiniani, Rome
