= 1970 Greek Football Cup final =

1970 Greek Cup final
- Event: 1969–70 Greek Football Cup
Aris	PAOK
1	0
- Date: 28 June 1970
- Venue: Kaftanzoglio Stadium, Thessaloniki
- Referee: Christos Michas (Athens)
- Attendance: 46,695

The 1970 Greek Cup final was the 26th final of the Greek Cup. The match took place on 28 June 1970 at Kaftanzoglio Stadium. The contesting teams were Aris and PAOK. It was Aris' fifth Greek Cup final in their 56 years of existence and PAOK's fourth Greek Cup final in their 44-year history. For the first time in the history of the institution, 2 teams from Thessaloniki reached the final, as a result of which the match was held there, for the first time after 37 years. It was the first Cup final that was broadcast live on television.

== Venue ==
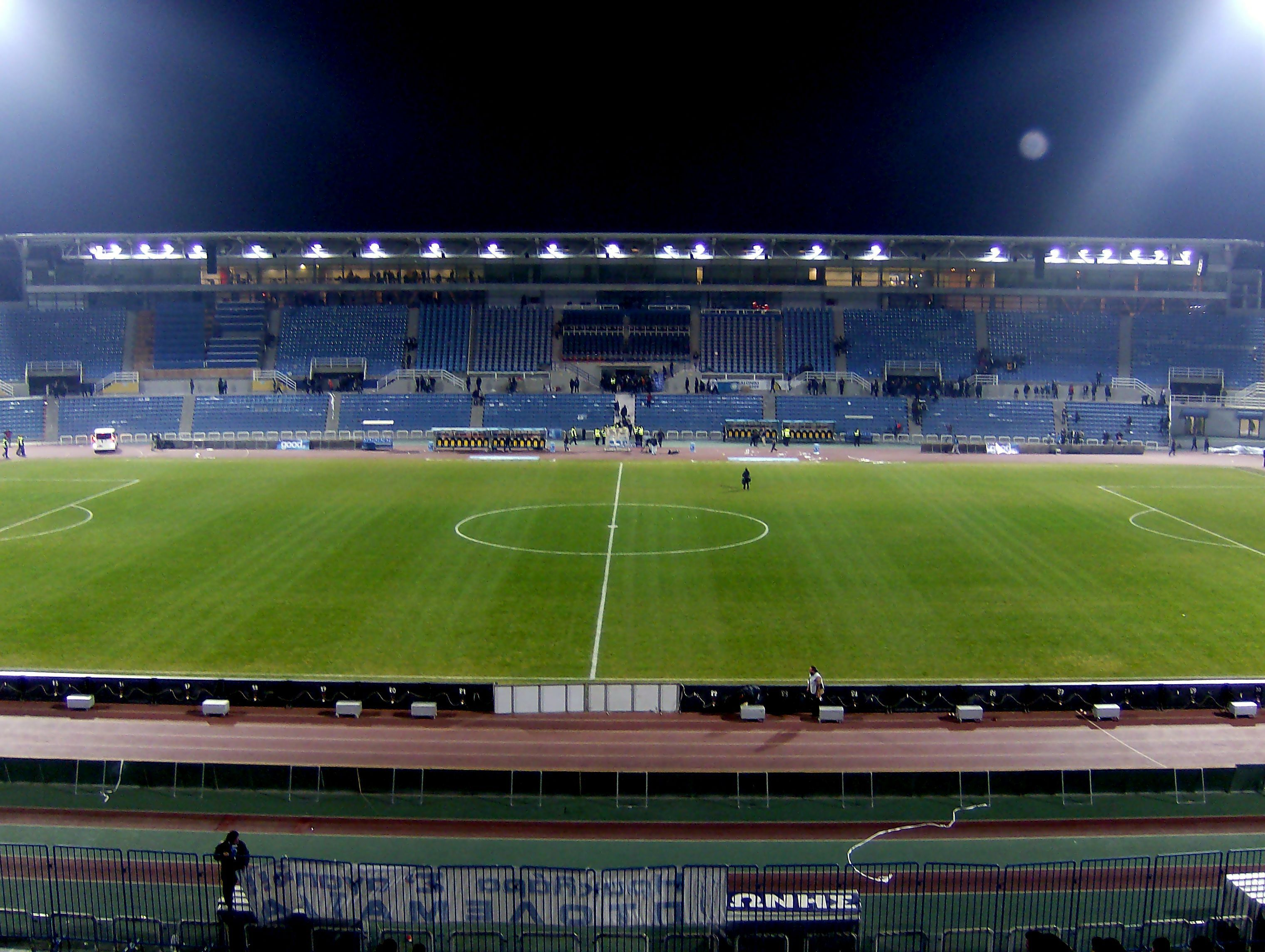
Kaftanzoglio Stadium.

This was the first Greek Cup final held at Kaftanzoglio Stadium.

Kaftanzoglio Stadium was built in 1960. The stadium is used as a venue for Iraklis and was used for Greece in 1969.

== Background ==
Aris had reached the Greek Cup final four times. The last time that had played in a final was in 1950, where they had lost to AEK Athens by 4–0.

PAOK had reached the Greek Cup final three times. The last time that they played in a final was in 1955, where they had lost to Panathinaikos by 2–0.

The two teams had never met each other in a Cup final.

== Route to the final ==
Aris		Round	PAOK	
Opponent	Result		Opponent	Result
A.P.S. Patras	1–0 (A)	Second round	Makedonikos	5–1 (H)
Bye		Additional round	Bye	
Panathinaikos	2–1 (H)	Round of 16	Pierikos	4–0 (H)
Kallithea	3–1 (A)	Quarter-finals	Panionios	1–0 (H)
Olympiacos	1–0 (A)	Semi-finals	Egaleo	1–0 (H)

== Match ==
=== Details ===
28 June 1970
20:30 EEST

Aris	1–0	PAOK
Keramidas 8'	Report (page 5)

Kaftanzoglio Stadium, Thessaloniki
Attendance: 46,695
Referee: Christos Michas (Athens)

GK	(Greece) Nikos Christidis (c)
DF	(Greece) Theodoros Pallas
DF	(Greece) Christos Nalbantis
DF	(Greece) Angelos Spyridon
DF	(Greece) Takis Raptopoulos
MF	(Greece) Sofoklis Semertzis	(substituted off) 60'
MF	(Greece) Vangelis Syropoulos
MF	(Greece) Manolis Keramidas
FW	(Greece) Alekos Alexiadis
FW	(Czechoslovakia) Joseph Michailidis
FW	(Greece) Kostas Papaioannou
Substitutes:
MF	(Greece) Vasilis Psifidis	(substituted on) 60'
Manager:
(Socialist Federal Republic of Yugoslavia) Milovan Ćirić

GK	(Greece) Stelios Christodoulou	(substituted off) 43'
DF	(Greece) Giorgos Papachristoudis
DF	(Greece) Aristarchos Fountoukidis
DF	(Greece) Emilios Theofanidis
DF	(Greece) Giorgos Makris	(substituted off) 27'
MF	(Greece) Thomas Dramalis
MF	(Greece) Christos Terzanidis
MF	(Greece) Stavros Sarafis
FW	(Greece) Dimitris Paridis
FW	(Greece) Giorgos Koudas (c)
FW	(Greece) Vasilis Lazos
Substitutes:
GK	(Greece) Kostas Pirtsos	(substituted on) 43'
DF	(Greece) Giorgos Kontogiorgos	(substituted on) 27'
Manager:
(Hungary) Jenő Csaknády

Assistant referees:
Nikos Fakis (Athens)
Timoleon Latsios (Larissa)

Match rules

- 90 minutes
- 30 minutes of extra time if necessary
- Penalty shootout if scores still level
- Five named substitutes
- Maximum of two substitutions

== See also ==
- 1969–70 Greek Football Cup
