= Joseph Michailidis =

Greek footballer

Personal information
- Date of birth: 15 October 1947 (age 79)
- Place of birth: Czechoslovakia
- Position: Midfielder

Senior career*
Years	Team	Apps	(Gls)
1966–1967	Spartak ZJŠ Brno	3	(0)
1969	FK Jablonec		
1969–1974	Aris	65	(6)
1974	Toronto Homer		
- * Club domestic league appearances and goals

Joseph Michailidis (born 15 October 1947) is a Czech former footballer who played as a midfielder. He is of Greek descent.

== Career ==
Michailidis played in the Czechoslovak First League with Spartak ZJŠ Brno in 1966. The following season he played with FK Jablonec. In late 1969, he played in the Alpha Ethniki with Aris Thessaloniki F.C. In his debut season with Thessaloniki he assisted in securing the 1969–70 Greek Football Cup. In the summer of 1974 he played in the National Soccer League with Toronto Homer.

== Managerial career ==
Michailidis served as a head coach for Olympiakos Chicago in the United States.
