= 1945–46 Panhellenic Championship =

12th season of top-tier football league in Greece

Panhellenic Championship
- Season: 1945–46
- Champions: Aris; 3rd Greek title
- Relegated: none
- Matches: 6
- Goals: 13 (2.17 per match)
- Top goalscorer: Kleanthis Vikelidis (3 goals)
- Biggest home win: Olympiacos 4–0 Aris
- Biggest away win: none
- Highest scoring: Aris 4–1 AEK Athens
- Longest winning run: Aris (2 matches)
- Longest unbeaten run: Aris (3 matches)
- Longest winless run: Olympiacos (3 matches)
- Longest losing run: Olympiacos (2 matches)
- Highest attendance: 8,000

The 1945–46 Panhellenic Championship was the 12th season of the highest football league of Greece and the first after the WW2. The clubs that participated were the champions from the three founding football associations of the HFF: Athens, Piraeus and Macedonia.

The championship was won by Aris for their 3rd title. Initially, with the completion of all six matches, Aris held the first place in the standings. But then the HFF accepted the objections of their opponents for illegal use of the player Siotis (which he played in two clubs at the same season), awarding 2–0 in their favor, the last three of his four matches (an away draw against AEK Athens and home wins against Olympiacos and AEK), while at the same time zeroed the club of Thessaloniki for those matches. For a few days, the ranking was formed with the declaration of the AEK as champion by the HFF and Aris bringing the issue to its general assembly. In the end, Aris were vindicated in the appeal and won the title. The point system was: Win: 3 points - Draw: 2 points - Loss: 1 point.

== Qualification round ==
=== Athens Football Clubs Association ===
Pos	Team	Pld	GF	GA	GR	Pts	Qualification
1	AEK Athens (Q)	15	49	19	2.579	38^{[a]}	Final round
2	Asteras Athens	15	41	18	2.278	38^{[a]}	
3	Panathinaikos	14	35	13	2.692	34^{[a]}	
4	Panionios	15	43	29	1.483	34^{[a]}	
5	Fostiras	15	27	23	1.174	32	
6	Athinaikos	14	21	24	0.875	28	
7	Apollon Athens	14	22	20	1.100	27	
8	Enosi Pangrati	14	13	26	0.500	26	
9	Olympiacos Athens	14	18	31	0.581	25	
10	Atlas Athens	14	24	30	0.800	24	
11	Atromitos	15	19	35	0.543	20	
12	Arion Kolonaki	13	8	54	0.148	15	

a. The ranking was formed based on the goal ratio.

- The championship was interrupted when on 19 May 1946 without the completion of the 15th matchday, while the replay matches were also postponed. The HFF declared the champions of Athens, Piraeus and Macedonia the first clubs of the standings, in order to participate in the Panhellenic championship.

=== Piraeus Football Clubs Association ===
Pos	Team	Pld	GF	GA	GR	Pts	Qualification
1	Olympiacos (Q)	13^{[b]}	56	8	7.000	37^{[a]}	Final round
2	Ethnikos Piraeus	14	42	12	3.500	37^{[a]}	
3	Proodeftiki	14	38	18	2.111	31	
4	Aris Piraeus	14	27	24	1.125	28	
5	Atromitos Piraeus	14	25	22	1.136	27	
6	Amyna Nikaia	14	17	40	0.425	21	
7	Argonaftis Piraeus	13^{[b]}	13	30	0.433	18	
8	Thiseas Piraeus	14	3	63	0.048	12	

a. The ranking was formed based on the goal ratio.
b. Olympiacos and Argonaftis had 1 match less but since the first and the last place had been decided, the match was canceled in order for the Panhellenic championship to start on time.

=== Macedonia Football Clubs Association ===
Pos	Team	Pld	GF	GA	GR	Pts	Qualification
1	Aris (Q)	10	—	—	—	25	Final round
2	Iraklis	10	—	—	—	22	
3	PAOK	10	—	—	—	21	
4	Megas Alexandros	10	—	—	—	19	
5	Makedonikos	10	—	—	—	18	
6	MENT	10	—	—	—	14	

== Final round ==
=== League table ===
Pos	Team	Pld	W	D	L	GF	GA	GD	Pts	ARIS	AEK	OLY
1	Aris (C)	4	2	1	1	6	6	0	9		4–1	1–0
2	AEK Athens	4	1	2	1	3	5	−2	8	1–1		1–0
3	Olympiacos	4	1	1	2	4	2	+2	7	4–0	0–0	

Source: rsssf
Legend: Blue = home team win; Yellow = draw; Red = away team win.
(C) Champions

=== Matches ===
30 May 1946
Matchday 1

Olympiacos	4–0	Aris
Chatzistavridis 29', 54'; Vasiliou 31'; Vazos 60'

Neo Phaliron Velodrome, Piraeus

2 June 1946
Matchday 2

AEK Athens	1–1	Aris
Maropoulos 69'; Mageiras (red card) 70'	Report	Vikelidis 19'; Stavrakabeis (red card) 70'

Leoforos Alexandras Stadium, Ampelokipoi
Attendance: 8,000
Referee: Sotiris Asprogerakas (Athens)

2 June 1946
Matchday 3

AEK Athens	1–0	Olympiacos
Nikolois 57'	Report

Leoforos Alexandras Stadium, Ampelokipoi
Referee: Manolis Zapardas (Piraeus)

6 June 1946
Matchday 4

Aris	1–0	Olympiacos
Vasiliadis 17'

Iraklis Stadium, Thessaloniki

16 June 1946
Matchday 5

Aris	4–1	AEK Athens
Vikelidis 5', 50'; Koloniaris 20'; Liakopoulos 60'		Nikolois 80'

Iraklis Stadium, Thessaloniki
Referee: Protopsaltis

30 June 1946
Matchday 6

Olympiacos	0–0	AEK Athens
Chatzistavridis (red card)	Report	Maropoulos (red card)

Neo Phaliron Velodrome, Piraeus
Referee: Kostas Tzitzis (Athens)

== Top scorers ==
Rank	Player	Club	Goals
1	(Greece) Kleanthis Vikelidis	Aris	3
2	(Greece) Alekos Chatzistavridis	Olympiacos	2
2	(Greece) Giorgos Nikolois	AEK Athens	2
4	(Greece) Nikos Vasiliou	Olympiacos	1
4	(Greece) Giannis Vazos	Olympiacos	1
4	(Greece) Kleanthis Maropoulos	AEK Athens	1
4	(Greece) Angelos Vasiliadis	Aris	1
4	(Greece) Michalis Kolonaris	Aris	1
4	(Greece) Giannis Liakopoulos	Aris	1
