= Portrait of Sir Henry Peirse =

Painting by Pompeo Batoni

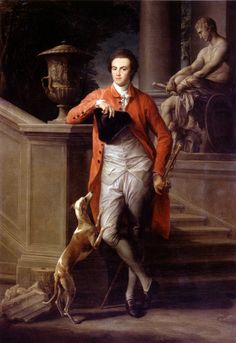
- Artist: Pompeo Batoni
- Year: circa 1775
- Medium: Oil on canvas
- Dimensions: 249 cm × 175 cm (98 in × 69 in)
- Location: Gallerie Nazionali di Arte Antica; Rome

Portrait of Henry Peirse is an oil painting on canvas completed c. 1775 by the Italian painter Pompeo Batoni and housed in the Pinacoteca of the Gallerie Nazionali di Arte Antica (Palazzo Barberini) in Rome.

== Description ==
The portrait of Henry Peirse is signed and dated at the base of the balustrade. The work derives from the collection of Sir Henry de la Poer Beresford Peirse, a descendant of the depicted gentleman. The portrait was commissioned by the gentleman during a visit to Rome. The painting was acquired by the state in 1970. Behind Peirse, to the right is the statue of the Ludovisi Ares and to the left, a large decorative urn. At his feet is an architectural fragment, and his pet dog angles for attention.

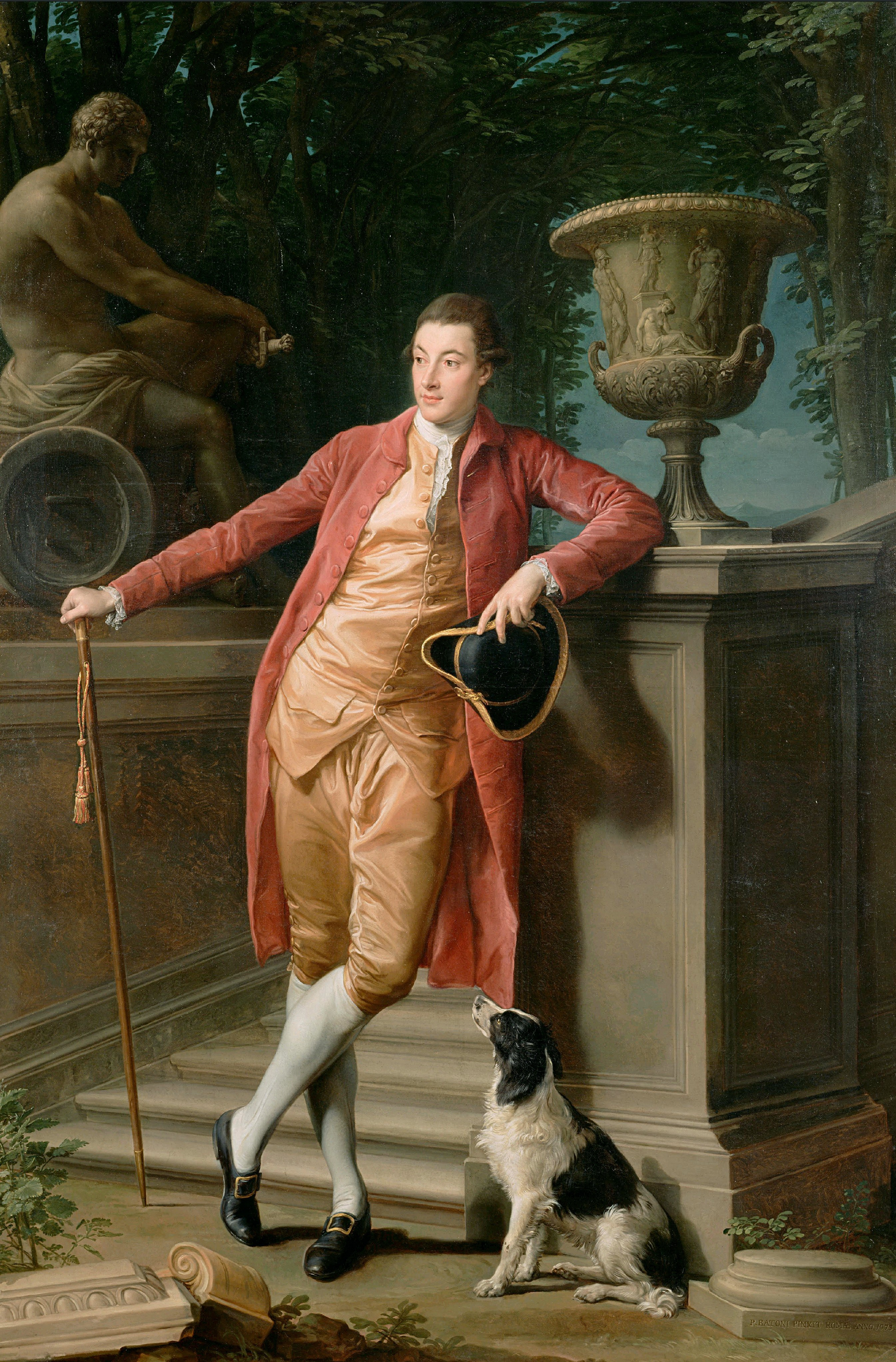
Portrait of John Chetwynd-Talbot

Batoni profited from painting a number of such portraits with similar elements for other travelers, including a Portrait of John Chetwynd-Talbot (1773) on display at the J. Paul Getty Museum in Los Angeles. The style of Batoni's work reflects a transition from the decorative and dramatic Baroque to a more serene Neoclassicism, literally quoting from Ancient Classic sculpture.
