= Giovanni Francesco Susini =

Italian sculptor

- The Abduction of Helen, 1626, Staatliche Kunstsammlungen Dresden
- Born: c. 1585; Florence, Grand Duchy of Tuscany
- Died: 17 October 1653; Florence, Grand Duchy of Tuscany
- Education: Giambologna
- Known for: Sculpture
- Movement: Renaissance; Mannerism

Giovanni Francesco (Gianfrancesco) Susini (c. 1585 – after 17 October 1653) was a Mannerist Florentine sculptor in bronze and marble.

== Life ==
Susini was born in Florence, and trained in the workshop of Giambologna. He continued to work in Giambologna's style, and Susini's sculpture was already mistaken for that of his master by the end of the century. His uncle, Antonio Susini, was the principal bronze-caster of Giambologna, and the young Francesco received early training as a junior member of Giambologna's workshop. A trip to Rome in 1624-26 gave him first-hand experience of classical antique, 16th century, and the emerging Baroque statuary, latter exemplified by Bernini's youthful Apollo and Daphne, but his own Mannerist style was already matured. He made wax copies of the recently discovered Borghese Hermaphroditus for casting upon his return to Florence. His bronze reduction of the Laocoön is likely based on the copy of it in Florence.

As a sculptor, Susini is known for some public commissions, such as the Fontana del Carciofo ("Artichoke Fountain", 1641), that stands centered with the piano nobile windows of the Palazzo Pitti's garden façade. The model for this final ensemble, according to the chronicler of artists Filippo Baldinucci, had been completed and approved in 1639; but like many productions for the Medici Grand Dukes, the fountain was a team project with a complicated history. For example, some of the putti had already been sculpted by Susini and assistants by 1621.

His first independent Medici commission was a bronze bas-relief for a chapel altar in 1614. Medici patronage required teamwork: the sculptor Orazio Mochi (died 1625) was given the challenge—unlikely to have been the sculptor's choice— of turning a genre subject suited to painting, two players at the roughhouse game of Sacchomazzone, into a sculpture for the Boboli Gardens. Assisted at first by Romolo Ferrucci del Tadda (died 1621), Susini reduced the subject to a small bronze, and set it on a small oval plinth to emphasize the tour-de-force of wildly thrashing figures. Other Susini sculptures contribute to the over-all effect of the Boboli Gardens: Cupid Breaking a Heart with a Hammer and Cupid Shooting an Arrow are part of the elaborate allegorical scheme of the "Island Basin" (the Vasca dell'Isola) located on the secondary axis. In 1615, he created the two acquasantiere of bronze on the columns in front of the main entrance of Santissima Annunziata.

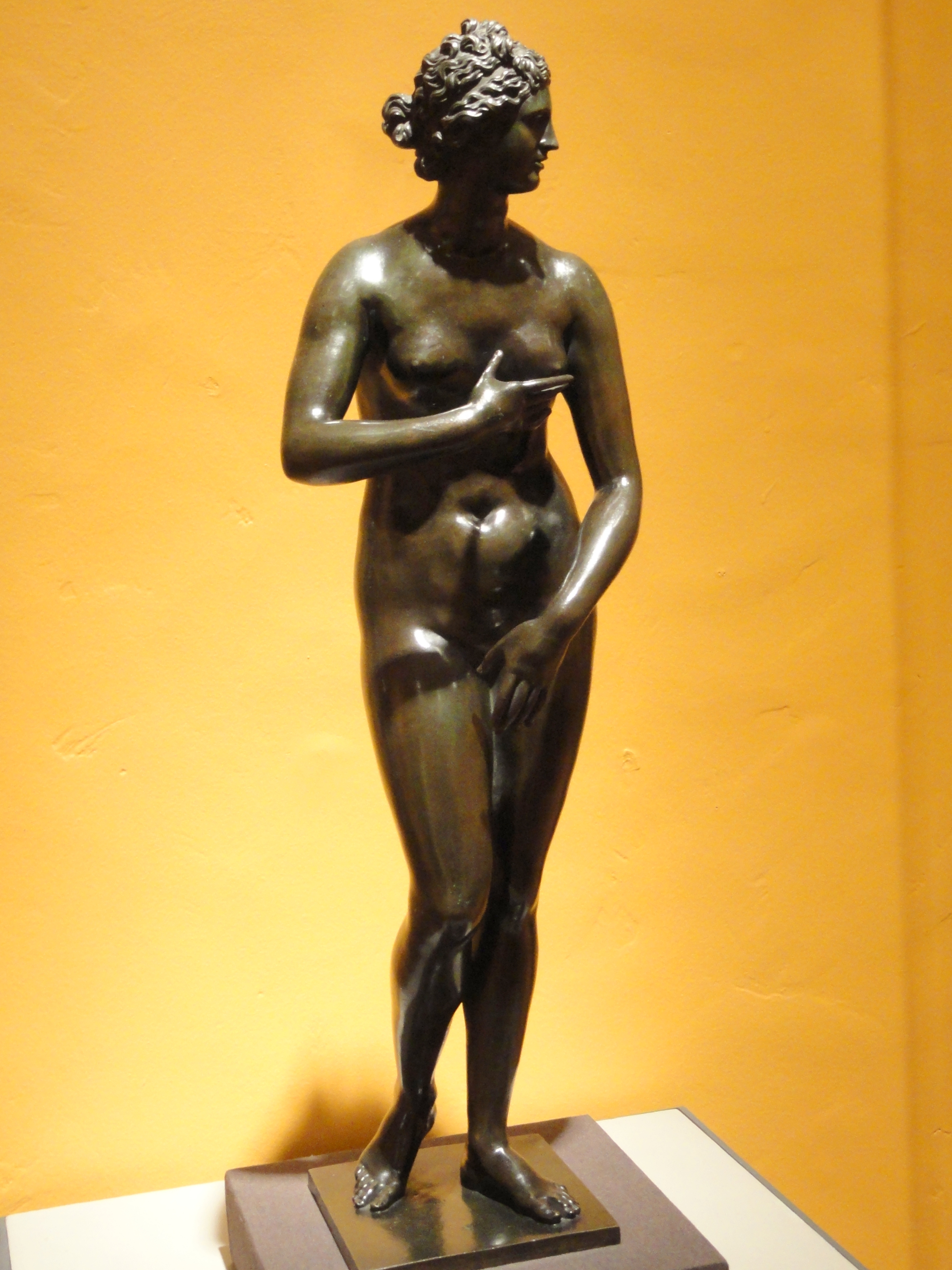
Venus, Museum of Fine Arts, Springfield, Massachusetts

Few Susini works bear his signature. A signed Bacchus is at the Louvre Museum. There are some signed bronze statuettes; the Abduction of Helen, signed and dated 1627 in the J. Paul Getty Museum, Los Angeles; Venus Burning the Arrows of Love signed IO. FR. SUSINI-FLOR. F. MDC. XXXIX and Venus Chastising Love signed IO. FR. SUSINI FLOR. FAC. M. DC. XXXVIIII, both of which André Le Nôtre gave to his patron Louis XIV in 1693, together with a Gaul Committing Suicide that is inspired by a well-known a Hellenistic marble (all now at the Louvre).The bronze David with the Head of Goliath in the Liechtenstein Museum, Vienna, is signed FRAN.SVSINI F..

Susini continued to operate the family bronze foundry. According to Baldinucci, Giovanni and Antonio Susini continued to use Giambologna's models after the elder master's death to cast finely finished bronze sculptures for discerning patrons. Like Giambologna, Susini's own designs characteristically employ two or three figures in complicated, balanced relationships meant to be appreciated from multiple viewpoints, as represented by the Abduction of Helen (Dresden and Getty Museum), two versions of Venus and Love (Louvre), David with the Head of Goliath (Liechtenstein collection, Vaduz) an analogue of the Ludovisi Mars in Rome, or Venus and Adonis provide characteristic examples of Susini's finely cast and finished table sculptures, meant to be appreciated at close range and admired from all sides. Most of his output of small bronzes could be profitably sold and transported to buyers outside of Tuscany.

A theme of Giambologna's in which Susini excelled was the dynamic and age-old theme of animals in combat, for which Hellenistic prototypes, available to artists in Rome in rediscovered Roman copies, provided inspiration. For example, the first of the pair of bronzes, Lion Attacking a Horse and Leopard Attacking a Bull, given to Frick Collection, New York, 2004, was inspired a fragmentary marble lion with torso of a horse, exhibited on the Campidoglio in the artist's lifetime.

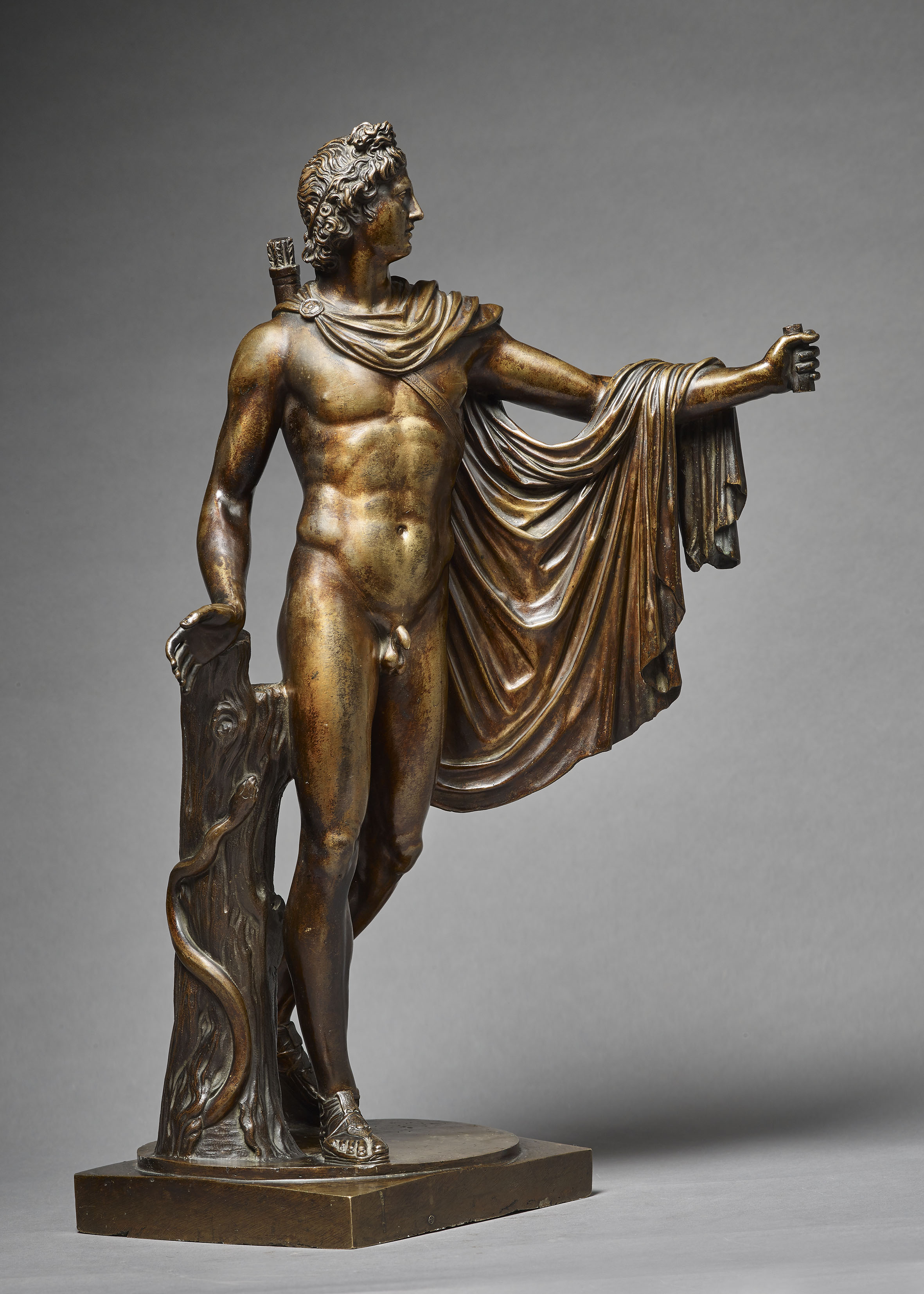
The Apollo Belvedere, Mougins Museum of Classical Art

Susini, Pietro Francavilla, and Pietro Tacca were contemporaries and pupils of Giambologna. Tacca is considered Giambologna's main pupil, and he worked mainly on larger bronzes.
