= Konstantinos Drampis =

Greek footballer

Personal information
- Full name: Konstantinos Drampis
- Date of birth: 1952 (age 73–74)
- Place of birth: Florina, Greece
- Height: 1.79 m (5 ft 10 in)
- Position: Central midfielder

Youth career
- 1969–1971: Florina

Senior career*
Years	Team	Apps	(Gls)
1971–1981	Aris	250	(48)
1982–1984	Makedonikos	34	(1)
- * Club domestic league appearances and goals

Konstantinos Drampis (Greek: Κωνσταντίνος Δράμπης; born in 1952) is a Greek footballer was a star midfielder for Aris Thessaloniki F.C. during the '70. He was fourth, on the all-time scorers list for Aris, having found the mark 48 times in his 250 appearances for the club. He was promoted as a first team regular by Wilf McGuinness in 1971 and left for Makedonikos after ten years where he retired in 1984.,
