= Kleanthis Vikelidis =

Greek footballer and manager (1915–1988)

- Kleanthis Vikelidis with Aris in 1940.

Personal information
- Date of birth: 15 September 1915
- Place of birth: Thessaloniki, Kingdom of Greece
- Date of death: 4 November 1988 (aged 73)
- Place of death: Thessaloniki, Greece
- Position: Forward

Senior career*
Years	Team	Apps	(Gls)
1933–1949	Aris	131	(72)

International career
1936–1948	Greece	7	(5)
- * Club domestic league appearances and goals

Kleanthis Vikelidis (Greek: Κλεάνθης Βικελίδης; 15 September 1915 – 4 November 1988) was a Greek footballer who played for Aris and Greece. He was also a manager, taking charge of Aris, PAOK and Apollon Kalamarias.

Vikelidis was born in 1916 in Thessaloniki and was the youngest of the three Vikelidis brothers that played for Aris, the others being Kostas and Nikiforos. He was instrumental in Aris winning the Panhellenic Championship in 1932 and 1946, given the nickname "Macedonian tank" (Greek: "Μακεδονικό τανκ"). During his career, Vikelidis was capped 7 times by the Greece National Football Team, scoring 4 goals. Vikelidis coached Aris twice in 1954 and 1959 and later continued his managing career with PAOK during the 1957 season and Apollon Kalamarias during the 1961 season. In his honour, Aris FC named their stadium at Charilaou, Kleanthis Vikelidis Stadium.

== International goals ==
#	Date	Venue	Opponent	Score	Result	Competition
1.	21 May 1936	Stadionul ONEF, Bucharest, Romania	Bulgaria	5–4	Lost	1936 Balkan Cup
2.	22 January 1938	Maccabiah Stadium, Tel-Aviv, Palestine/Eretz Israel	Mandatory Palestine	1–3	Win	1938 FIFA World Cup qualification
3.	22 January 1938	Maccabiah Stadium, Tel-Aviv, Palestine/Eretz Israel	Mandatory Palestine	1–3	Win	1938 FIFA World Cup qualification
4.	20 February 1938	Leoforos Alexandras Stadium, Athens, Greece	Mandatory Palestine	1–0	Win	1938 FIFA World Cup qualification
5.	23 April 1948	Leoforos Alexandras Stadium, Athens, Greece	Turkey	1–3	Lost	Friendly
Correct as of 22 November 2016

== See also ==
- List of one-club men in football
