= Christos Nalbantis =

Greek footballer (born 1944)

Personal information
- Date of birth: 17 May 1944 (age 82)
- Position: Defender

Senior career*
Years	Team	Apps	(Gls)
1965–1976	Aris		
1976–1977	AEL		
1977–1978	Makedonikos		

International career
1971–1972	Greece	2	(0)

Managerial career
- 1981: Aris
- 1988: Panserraikos
- * Club domestic league appearances and goals

Christos Nalbantis (Greek: Χρήστος Nαλμπάντης; born 17 May 1944) is a retired Greek football defender.
