= Aris Thessaloniki F.C. =

Aris
- Full name: Aris Thessaloniki Football Club
- Nicknames: Theós tou Polémou (God of War); Kitrinomavroi (The Yellow-Blacks)
- Founded: 25 March 1914; 112 years ago
- Stadium: Kleanthis Vikelidis Stadium
- Capacity: 22,800
- Owner: Amani Swiss
- Chairman: Irini Karipidou
- Head coach: Michalis Grigoriou
- League: Super League Greece
- 2025–26: Super League Greece, 5th of 14
- Website: arisfc.com.gr
Home colours	Away colours	Third colours

Aris FC (Greek: ΠΑΕ Άρης) ['aris], commonly known as Aris Thessaloniki or simply Aris, is a Greek professional football club from the city of Thessaloniki, Macedonia, Greece. The team competes in the top-tier Super League Greece and their home ground is the Kleanthis Vikelidis Stadium.

Founded in 1914, the club was a founding member of the Macedonian Football Clubs Association, as well as the Hellenic Football Federation. The colours of the club are golden/yellow, a dominant colour in the culture of Macedonia and reminiscent of the Byzantine heritage of Thessaloniki, and black. It is named after Ares, the ancient Olympian "God of War," associated also with courage and masculinity, whose image is portrayed on the club's logo as depicted in the Ludovisi Ares sculpture. It is considered as one of the biggest teams in Greece and is part of the multi-sports club Aris Thessaloniki.

Aris was also one of the strongest and most popular teams in Greece during the interwar period. They have won the Greek championship three times (1928, 1932, 1946), the Greek Cup once (1970), and they had an undefeated home record in European competitions for 28 matches from 1968 to 2020, when they lost to Kolos Kovalivka but without crowd due to COVID. Other than that Aris has never lost playing at home in European competitions.

== History ==
=== Foundation and golden years: 1920–1950 ===
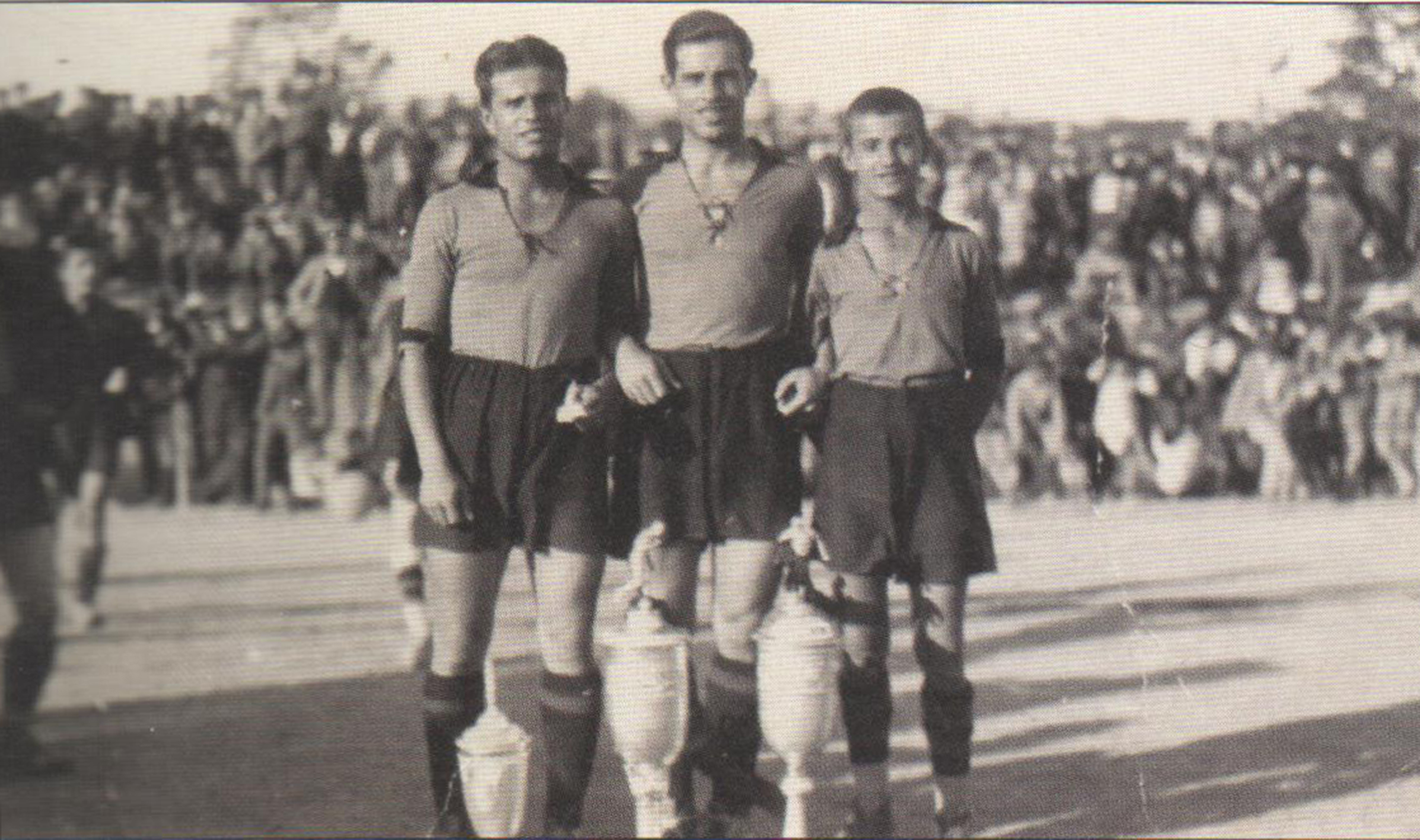
Nikiphoros, Kostas and Kleanthis Vikelidis (1930)

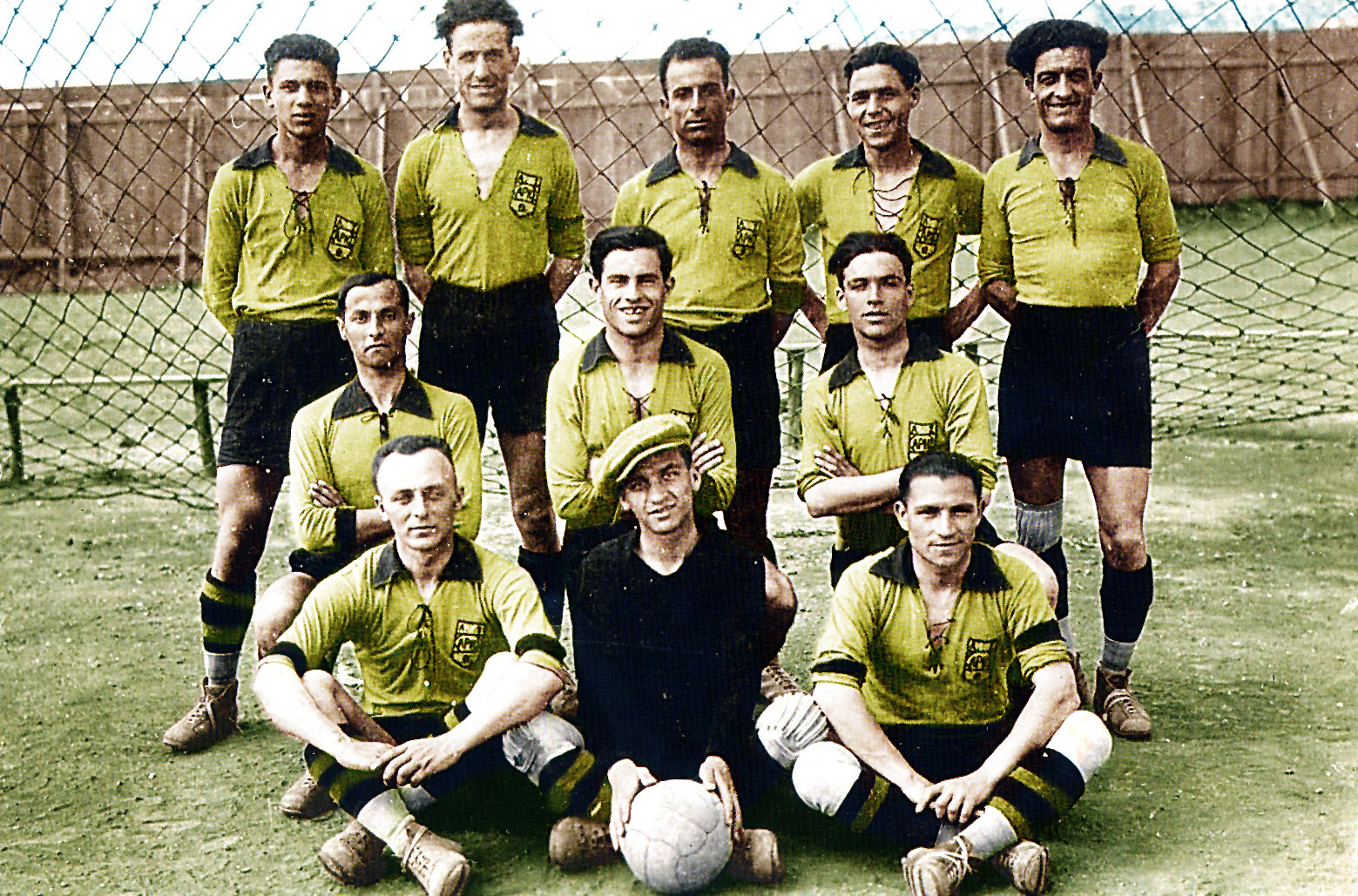
The champion team of 1928

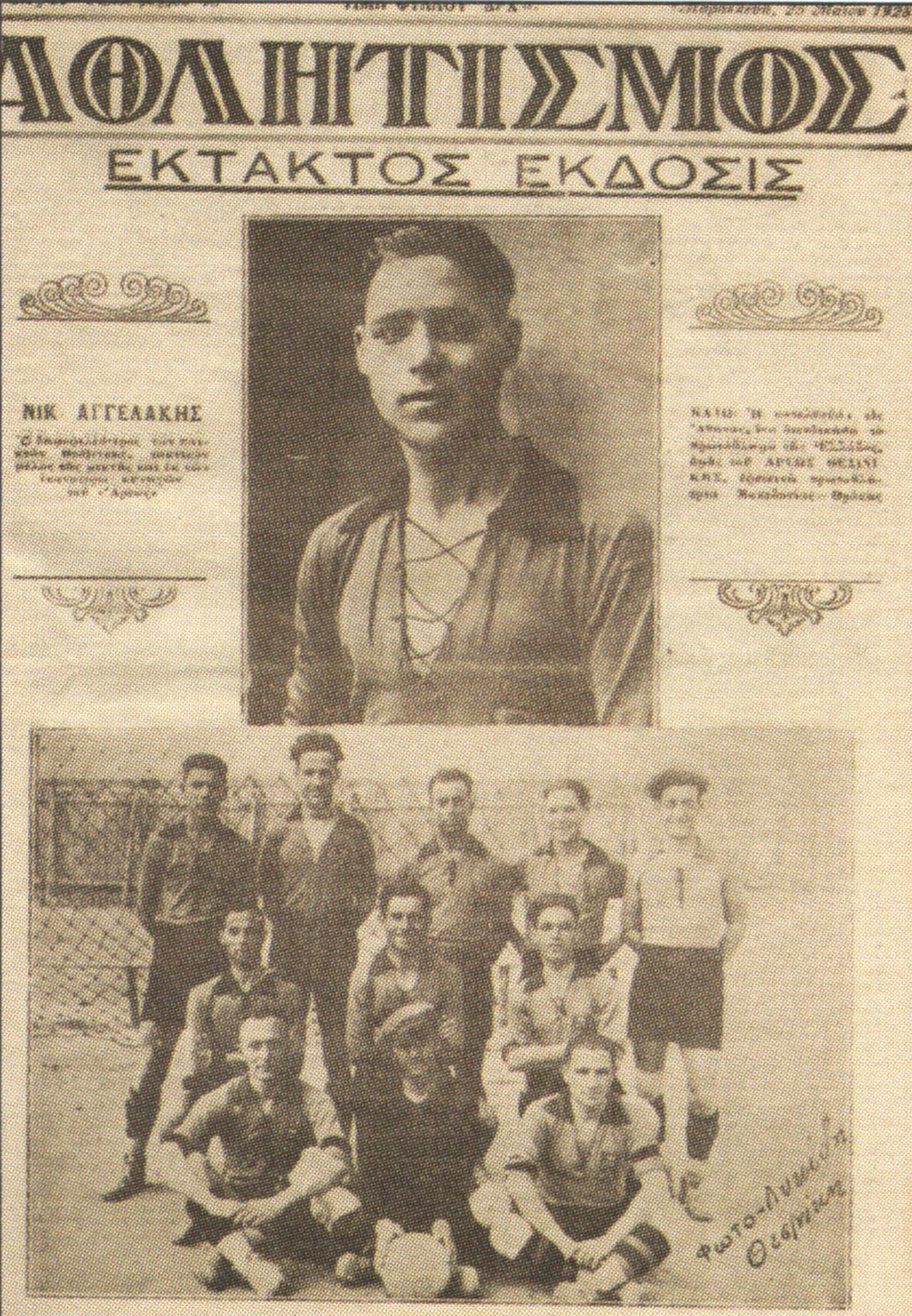
Aris, the champion of 1928

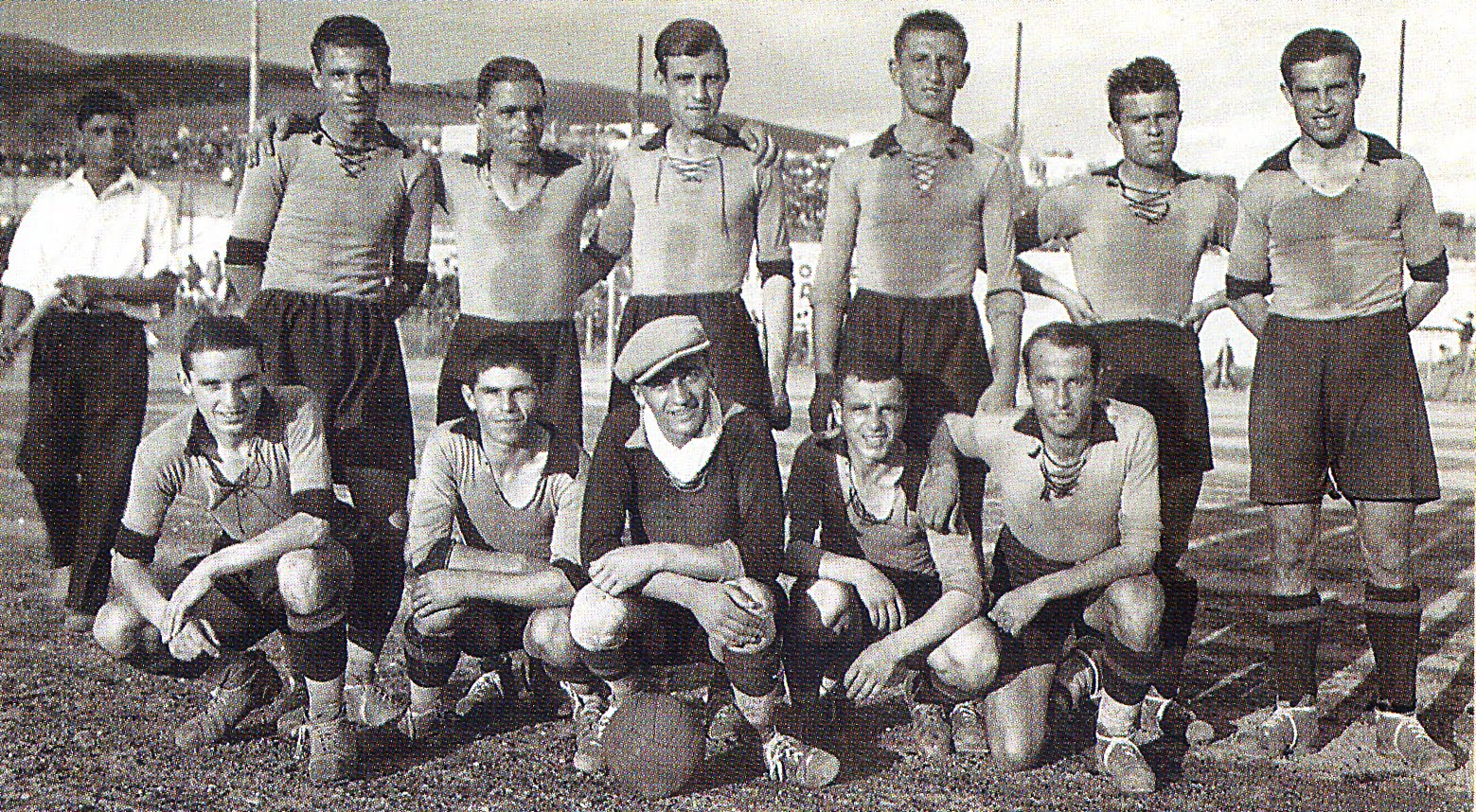
The champion team of 1932

The club was established as a football club ("Podosferikos Syllogos Aris Thessalonikis") by a group of 22 young friends in a coffee bar in Votsi area on 25 March 1914 and given the name Aris from Ares, the ancient god of war. Its nickname was inspired by the two Balkan Wars of 1912–1913, when Greece fought against the Ottoman Empire before engaging in a war with Bulgaria. In Greek mythology, Aris was a deity who was in conflict with Heracles, the mythological character after which Aris's rival football team, Iraklis, was named. Aris holds a fierce rivalry with PAOK. At first, the club was based on a near the Arch and Tomb of Galerius, but after the accession of two minor football clubs in 1919 and 1921 the club's base was moved near to Flemming Street of eastern Thessaloniki. The first stadium was built on the site where Mars Field Park currently lies on Stratou Avenue. Quickly the club became very popular and soon new teams apart from football were established.

During this early stage of football in Greece no professional league was established. Instead, three minor leagues [in Macedonia (E.P.S.M.), Athens (E.P.S.A.) and Piraeus (E.P.S.P.)] were created, with the champions of each league competing in a postseason mini tournament to claim the title of the national champion. The first official game was held in 1923 against Megas Alexandros Thessaloniki (Alexander the Great), another Thessalonician team. That year marked the first title, when Aris was named regional champion of Macedonia, something that was repeated next year.

In 1926 the club was renamed "Athletic Club Aris Thessaloniki" to include also other sports than football.

Aris' first major success was between 1927 and 1928 when they won the first Greek Championship, beating finalists Atromitos and Ethnikos Piraeus exploiting the abstention from the championship teams of RECs. In the first race on 24 May, the team of Thessaloniki prevailed 3–1 Atromitos, while three days after losing to Ethnikos Piraeus 3–2. In iterative matches played in June in Thessaloniki, Aris won both of his opponents by 3–1 and thus crowned the first champion of Greece. Coach of the team was the German Thomas Kessler, and prominent players of Aris were, among others, Kostas Vikelidis, Savvas Vogiatzis that emerged and top scorer with six goals, Nikolaos Angelakis, scorer of the finals with four goals and Dionysis Caltech.

The following year, it was held the final stage of national championships although Aris won the championship title in Thessaloniki, playing two matches barrage against PAOK. The first took place on 12 May 1929 and ended 1–1, while the second was held on 2 June with Aris to beats 4–3, having Angelakis scoring a hat-trick.

On 20 April 1929, the first friendly match took place between Aris and Panathinaikos, the "yellows" to defeat 5–4. The second championship came four years later in 1932, only this time his opponents were Olympiacos, Panathinaikos, AEK Athens, Ethnikos Piraeus, PAOK and Iraklis. Aris managed to collect 22 points in this mini tournament, four more than the second, Panathinaikos, scoring large wins like 7–0 against Panathinaikos, 7–3 against Iraklis and 3–0 versus AEK Athens and Olympiacos in Athens, also new star players emerged, Kitsios, Angelakis, Vogdanou, Gigopoulos, while Belgian manager De Valer guided effectively the club.

Four years after winning the first Panhellenic title, the "yellows" won the championship. Aris became champion amassing a total of 22 points, four more than second Panathinaikos and scoring big wins like 7–0 against Panathinaikos with four goals Maywood, 6–1 on Apollon Athens with six goals in the Angelakis' first home appearance with the first group of Kleanthis Vikelidis, 7–3 vs Iraklis with four goals Kitsos and away 0–3 over Olympiacos, PAOK and AEK. Leading scorer of the league emerged Nikos Kitsos with 15 goals and Nikos Angelakis to 14.

Big stars of that team were Kitsos, Angelakis, Kaltekis, and Vogdanou Gikopoulos while coach De Valera.

That same year, the EPO instituted for the first time the Greek Cup, Mars crashing Panathinaikos 7–2 in the quarterfinal. This was followed by victory over Apollon Athens, to reach the final where they lost 5–3 from AEK Athens, losing the chance to win the first doubles.

Aris won their third title in 1946, playing against two teams, AEK Athens and Olympiacos, champions of Athens and Piraeus, respectively. Aris beat Olympiacos twice, scoring two goals and conceding none; came to a draw with AEK in Athens and defeated them in PAOK's stadium in Thessaloniki (score 4–1). Aris has not won a championship since the establishment of the First Division (1959).

Up to 1959, when the first national division was established, Aris managed to finish first 14 times in the Macedonian division.

=== Modern times (1950–1981) ===
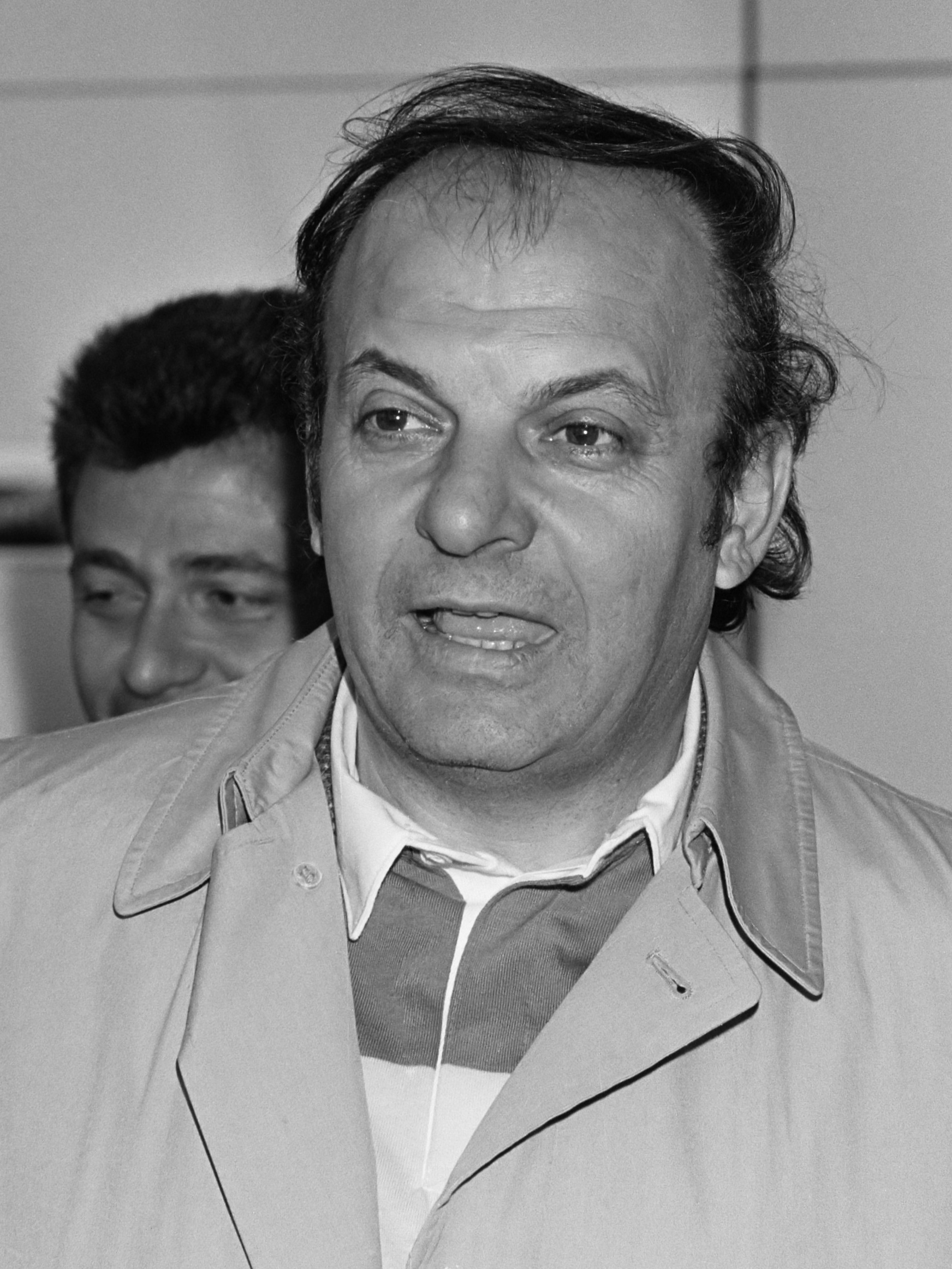
Alketas Panagoulias

Aris' status remained high during this period, which was marked by the construction of the club's homeground, the Kleanthis Vikelides Stadium, named after the legendary homonymous player. Before World War II, Aris' homeground was located in the center of the city, near the Thessaloniki International Fair, but was abandoned in 1936 in order for the Pedion tou Areos park (Mars Field) to be created. The club managed to buy some land during 1951 in a quarter of the city named Charilaou, where the new Stadium was slowly built.

Also in 1959, the tripartite minor league system was abandoned and a new, unified Championship was created.

The club's accomplishments during these years were significant. It was one of the first teams in Greece to qualify for European tournaments. Under the leadership of Alexandros Alexiades, Giorgos Pantziaras and Takis Loukanidis.

==== 1970 Cup Winners ====
Aris earned high placings in the League during the 1960s and 1970s, with apex the 1970 Cup against the club's fierce rival, PAOK, in Kaftanzoglio Stadium.

In the 1970s, Aris was reorganized and a vast number of young players from Thessaloniki, including Kouis, Firos, Drambis, Zindros and Papafloratos led the club. Its most important achievements during that period included a successful 1980 UEFA campaign when Aris eliminated Benfica and Perugia. Aris was also the first Greek club to score a victory both in Italy and Portugal. At home, the team shared first place with Olympiacos at the end of the 1979–80 season, though it lost the title 2–0 in a tie-breaker against the Piraeus club in Volos National Stadium.

=== Stone years (1981–2006) ===
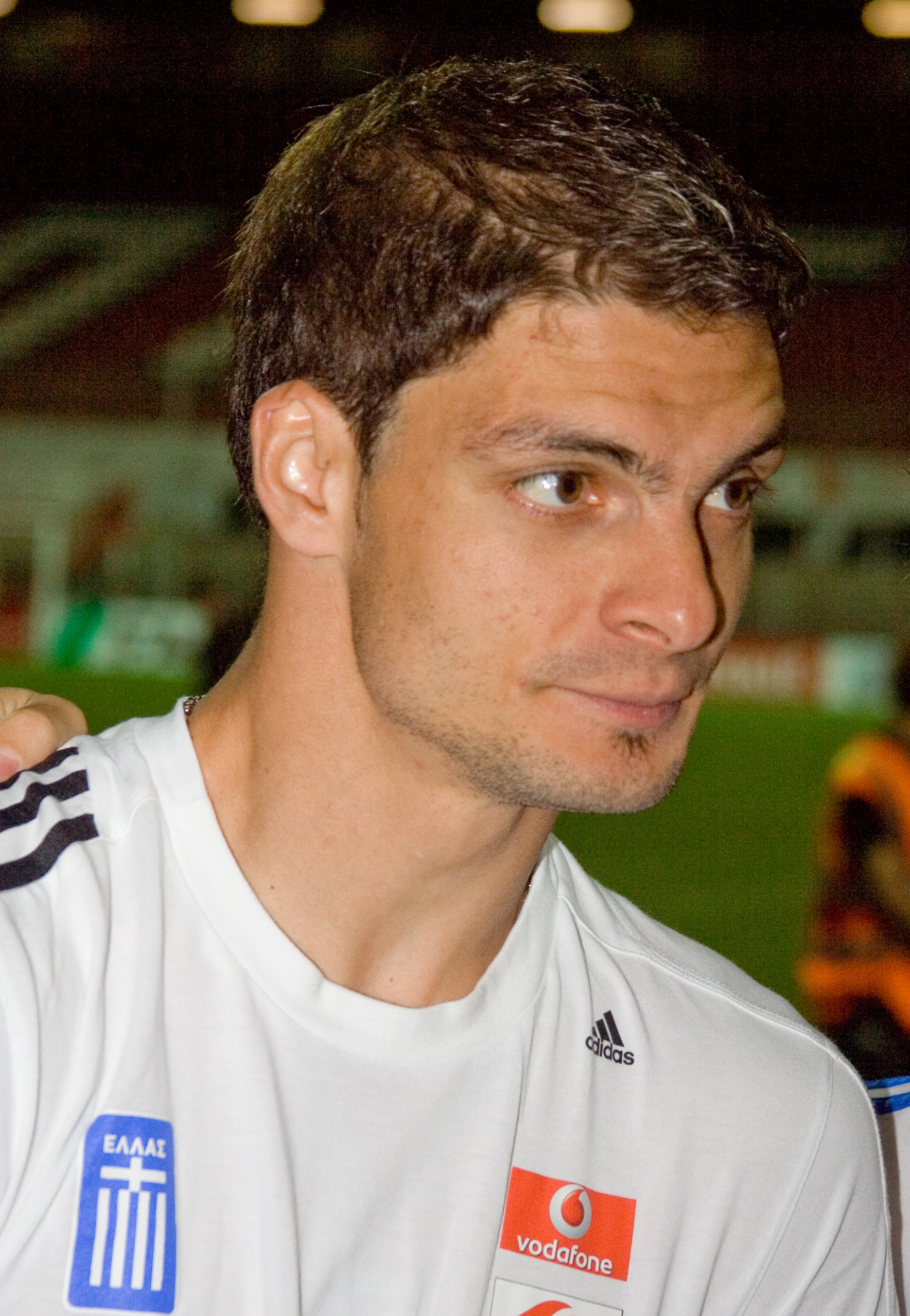
Angelos Charisteas

After the mid-1980s and the retirement of the club's honored old guard, Aris entered in a slow decline, rarely reaching European league qualification or notable Greek League position, which—in combination with appreciable financial troubles that left the club near bankruptcy—led to the club's relegation to the Second Division in 1997 and 2005. Both times though Aris managed to resume its place in the first division.

=== Aris Members' Society era (2006–2014) ===
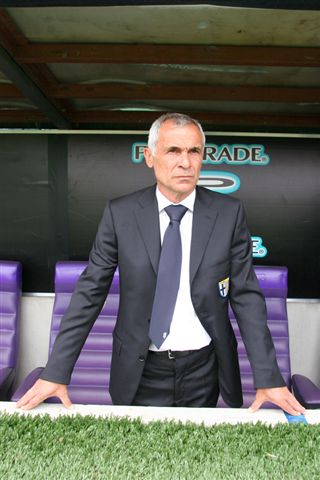
Héctor Cúper, manager of the club (2009–2011).

In recent years, specially after the creation of an Aris Members' Society that controls the club's fortunes, Aris has qualified several times for the UEFA Europa League, finished fourth in the Super League three times, and has reached in the Greek Cup Final four times, losing in 2003, 2005, 2008 and 2010, when 25,000 Aris fans went to Athens in the biggest ever move of fans in Greece. In 2008 and 2010 Aris made it through to the UEFA Europa League group stage after eliminating Real Zaragoza and Austria Wien respectively during the Cup's play-off rounds. During the 2010–11 UEFA Europa League they managed to play for the first time in club's history in Europe after Christmas, after a very good appearance in the group stage where they won 1–0 at home and 2–3 away and eliminated the title holders Atlético Madrid. Recent developments include the interest from the club's board to construct a new, modern stadium in eastern Thessaloniki Metropolitan Area to replace the obsolete Kleanthis Vikelidis Stadium and the modernization and expansion of the club's training facilities in Neo Rysio, Thessaloniki. Also, in a unique move for Greek standards, the board decided in December 2009 to establish a radio station, Aris FM 92.8 in order to promote the communication between Aris fans around the country and the coverage of the clubs activities. In 2014, due to financial problems Aris was relegated to the third tier of Greek football.

=== Relegation ===
After their relegation many were wondering who was going to take care of the team. American business man Alex Kalas emerged the first season with him in charge of the football department while they failed to gain promotion to the Football League. In summer 2015 where the next elections for the role of head of football department Kalas won again and promised to put more money into the club. Kalas also made a number of signings, Honduran legend Carlos Costly, Sierra Leone international John Kamara, Spaniard Guillermo Pérez Moreno, Portuguese footballer Fábio Ruben Moreira Tavares, defender Paschalis Melissas and defender Stavros Petavrakis. Due to Aris failing to get into the second division Kalas was sacked despite only being there for a month. Aris would have to play another year in Gamma Ethniki. While in the Gamma Ethniki, the team demanded that the Hellenic Football Federation allow them to be promoted to a higher level of Greek football. The federation declined to do this and several appeals against the decision were rejected. As a result, 10,000 fans took to the streets on the 26 and 31 August 2015 in Thessaloniki to protest the decision. These protests caused clashes between the police and the fans that led to arrests and Aris didn't manage to get promoted to the professional divisions.

=== Karipidis era ===
Although after the Aris election Arvanitidis became leader of the football department, Theodoros Karipidis was named the head of football department the day afterwards. He signed many players in a few days including former Greek footballer of the club Andreas Tatos, former Real Madrid defender Raul Bravo club legend Sergio Koke, as well as many Super League quality players like Kostas Kaznaferis, Vasilios Rovas, Nikos Tsoumanis, Giannis Siderakis as well as many others. Theodoros Karipidis appointed Nikos Anastopoulos as the manager. During the 2015–16 season Aris managed to be promoted to the second division of Greece with a 21-point difference from the second club. Finally, Irene Karypidis became the major shareholder with overwhelming proportion over 89%.

== Club culture, supporters and rivalry with PAOK ==
Aris Thessaloniki has a long-established supporter base in Greece, centred primarily in the city of Thessaloniki. Historically, Aris drew support from more affluent and upper-class segments of the population, contrasting with PAOK FC, founded in 1926 by Greek refugees from Constantinople, whose supporters were initially drawn from working-class communities. Over time, these social distinctions have become less clear, and the clubs' fan bases are now more diverse. The rivalry with PAOK is one of the most intense in Greek football. Their stadiums, Kléantis Vikelidis for Aris and Toumba for PAOK, are located only 1.5 kilometres apart, which has contributed to frequent clashes between fans. The first recorded match between the two clubs took place on 12 June 1927, with PAOK winning 2-1, and the rivalry has developed through decades of local and national competition. By 2025, the clubs had met 208 times, with PAOK winning 73 games, Aris 66, and 69 matches ending in draws. Both clubs have experienced domestic success, with Aris winning three Greek League championships (1928, 1932, 1946) and one Greek Cup (1970), while PAOK has won four league titles (1976, 1985, 2019, 2024) and eight Greek Cups.

The rivalry has been marked by frequent violence, particularly between ultras and organised fan groups. A notable escalation occurred on 1 February 2022, when 19-year-old Aris supporter Alkis Kampanos was stabbed and beaten to death by PAOK supporters near the Kléantis Vikelidis stadium. Two of his friends were injured in the attack. This incident prompted government intervention, including the suspension of fan clubs, police raids, and stricter penalties for violent behaviour. Previous clashes have also resulted in fatalities, such as the death of a Bulgarian supporter of Botev Plovdiv, a club allied with Aris, after being attacked by PAOK ultras in January 2020. Efforts to reduce violence have included legal reforms, temporary stadium closures, restrictions on away-game attendance, and police crackdowns on ultras.

Aris Thessaloniki's supporter base, particularly through its main fan club Super 3, is strongly identified with left-wing and anarchist politics. The group explicitly opposes racism, fascism, and neo-Nazi ideologies, and this stance is visibly expressed in the club’s stadium, Kleanthis Vikelidis, where anti-fascist and anti-capitalist symbols are displayed and nationalist displays, such as Greek flags, are restricted. The second-largest supporters’ club, Ierolohites, shares these anti-fascist principles, and smaller self-organized groups within the Aris fanbase also uphold similar views. Historically, Aris supporters have demonstrated solidarity with international and domestic leftist causes, including protests against police violence in Greece and abroad, campaigns for refugee support, and acts of support for Palestinian and Basque nationalist movements.

After the murder of Pavlos Fyssas by a Golden Dawn member in 2013, Super 3 hung banners stating "Football will be played with the heads of the Nazis", and participated in direct actions against the party, such as removing its flag from local offices. The group has also actively opposed corporate influence perceived as environmentally or socially harmful, exemplified by rejecting investment from Eldorado Gold due to its mining operations in Halkidiki. Moreover, Aris supporters maintain a critical stance toward state authority, regularly displaying anti-police sentiments such as ACAB banners and mobilising to defend fellow fans from arrests.

== Crest and colours ==
=== Crest evolution ===
A company of young Thessalonians inspired the name of the club by Ares, the ancient Olympian "God of War", after the successful military operations of the Kingdom of Greece during the Balkan Wars, and the liberation of Thessaloniki in 1912 from the Ottoman Empire. The emblem of the team is a resting Ares (Greek: Άρης), as depicted in the Ludovisi Ares sculpture. This emblem was chosen in the late 1970s to replace an older and simpler logo which was used since 1914. Also, during the 2000s, a scheme of meander was added to the crest.

The colors of the team are yellow or gold of glory, dominant colour in the culture of Macedonia, and black. Alternative colours also used include white or even dark red uniforms. During the 2000s, the club introduced also a shade of lime.

=== Kit evolution ===
First

1917–23	1927–28	1928–29	1937–38	1956–57	1982–83	2003–04	2004–05 A

2004–05 B	2006–07	2007–08	2008–09	2009–10	2010–11	2014–15	2017–18

Alternative

1927–28	1982–83	2006–08	2007–08	2010–11	2015	2015–16	2017–18

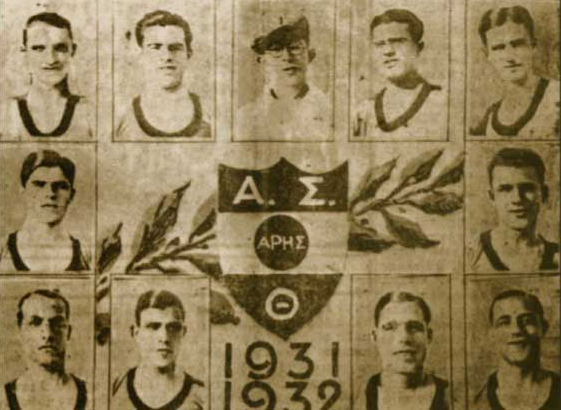
Old poster with older crest and the champion team of Aris Thessaloniki (1931–32 season)

=== Shirt and sponsors history ===
The following table shows in detail Aris kit manufacturers and shirt sponsors by year:

Period	Kit manufacturer	Shirt sponsor
1980–1989	Adidas	—
1989–1990	ASICS	—
1990–1991	ASICS	Coplam
1991–1992	Diadora	Coplam
1992–1993	Diadora	SPANOS
1993–1994	Diadora	Bronx Shoes
1994–1995	Diadora	Ioniki Zois
1995–1996	Kappa	Propo
1996–1997	Umbro	—
1997–1998	Puma	Puma
1998–1999	Puma	Megacard
1999–2002	Puma	Interamerican
2002–2003	Adidas	MORITZ
2003–2004	Le Coq Sportif	DEPA
2004–2005	Adidas	Enimex
2005–2006	Adidas	OPAP
2006–2007	Adidas	Lampsi
2007–2008	Adidas	EKO
2008–2010	Reebok	EKO
2010–2011	Under Armour	good.gr
2011–2014	Under Armour	KINO
2014–2015	Stabomania	Swedish Systems Security
2015–2018	Nike	Stoiximan.gr
2018–2019	Nike	Karipidis Pallets
2019–2021	Nike	betshop.gr
2021–2023	Adidas	NetBet.gr
2023–	Kappa	novibet

== Facilities ==
=== Stadium ===
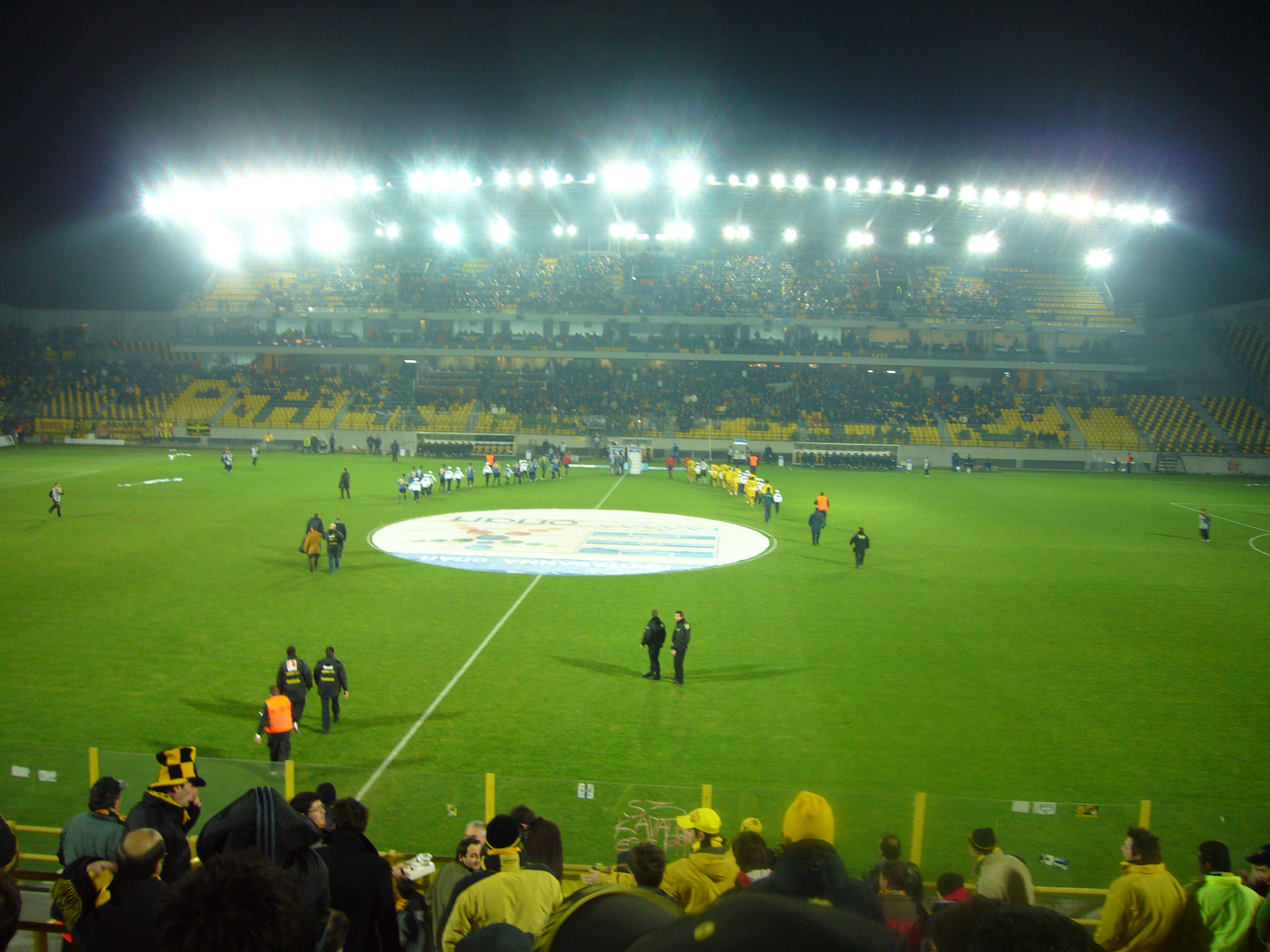
A view inside the Kleanthis Vikelides Stadium

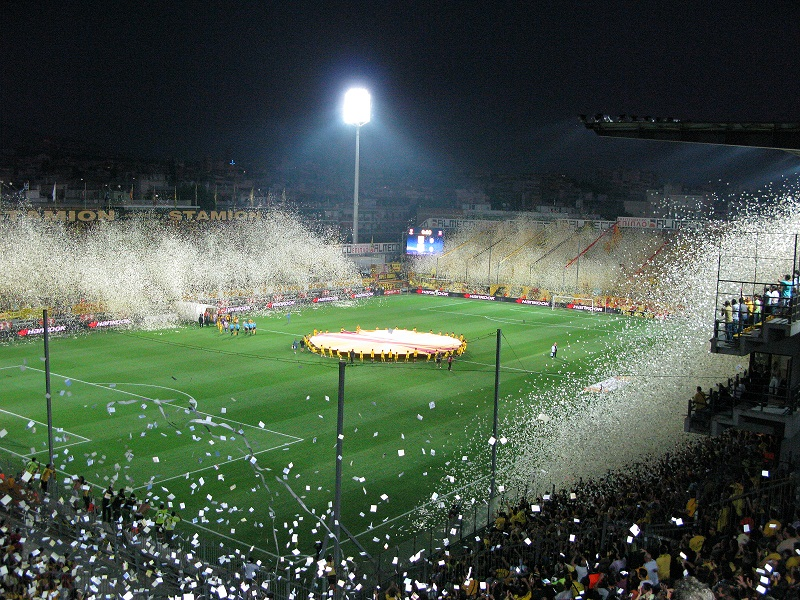
Kleanthis Vikelides Stadium during a UEFA Europa League match

The stadium of Aris Thessaloniki is named Kleanthis Vikelides after the club's legendary player. It is located at 69 Alkminis, Charilaou; 54249 Thessaloniki, and was built in 1951. In 1972, it got a new roof, in 1975 a new north stand, and in 2004, it was fully renovated. Its current total capacity is 22,800 spectators.

=== Training facilities ===
Since the late 1970s, Aris Thessaloniki has created its own training grounds in Neo Rysio (Dasygenio Sports Center), just outside Thessaloniki near the International Airport covering three hectares and including football fields, hosting area with gym, pool and sauna, press room, offices, restaurant and locker rooms. The facilities were rebuilt in September 2010 after a demand placed by manager Héctor Cúper. The facilities were renovated again in 2018 and the grass was ultimately changed in 2019.

== Players ==
=== Current squad ===
As of 14 September 2026

Note: Flags indicate national team as defined under FIFA eligibility rules; some limited exceptions apply. Players may hold more than one non-FIFA nationality.

No.	Pos.	Nation	Player
1	GK	GRE	Sokratis Dioudis
2	DF	FRA	Jeremy Petris
3	DF	ENG	Omar Richards
4	DF	BRA	Fabiano (captain)
5	MF	ESP	Manu García
6	MF	GRE	Konstantinos Galanopoulos
7	MF	ARG	Benjamín Garré (on loan from Vasco da Gama)
8	FW	CIV	Christian Kouamé
9	FW	ZIM	Tino Kadewere
10	MF	SRB	Uroš Račić
14	MF	CIV	Diallo Sanoussi
17	FW	ESP	Rafa Mir (on loan from Sevilla)
18	MF	CMR	Martin Hongla
19	FW	FRA	Migouel Alfarela
20	MF	NGR	Tom Dele-Bashiru
21	GK	CRO	Lovro Majkić

No.	Pos.	Nation	Player
22	MF	GRE	Michalis Voriazidis
24	GK	GRE	Apostolos Barbopoulos
25	MF	SEN	Mamadou Gning
27	DF	SEN	Noah Fadiga
29	MF	GRE	Sarafianos Papasarafianos
30	DF	GRE	Christos Kamtsis
33	GK	POR	Ricardo Velho
34	MF	ARG	Sebastián Palacios
41	MF	GRE	Konstantinos Charoupas
44	DF	CRO	Boško Šutalo (on loan from Standard Liège)
45	DF	SEN	Matar Thiam
49	MF	BEL	Othmane Boussaid
70	MF	GRE	Giannis Gianniotas
77	FW	POR	Bruma
80	FW	ESP	Loren Morón
97	MF	FIN	Fredrik Jensen

=== Out on loan ===
Note: Flags indicate national team as defined under FIFA eligibility rules; some limited exceptions apply. Players may hold more than one non-FIFA nationality.

No.	Pos.	Nation	Player
—	MF	BRA	Dudu (at Akron Tolyatti until 30 June 2027)
—	MF	ESP	Monchu (at Juárez until 31 December 2026)
—	MF	GRE	Alexandros Lafkas (at Apollon Kalamarias until 30 June 2027)

No.	Pos.	Nation	Player
—	MF	CRC	Álvaro Zamora (at Académico de Viseu until 30 June 2027)
—	FW	SEN	Tafsir Diop (at Apollon Kalamarias until 30 June 2027)

== Honours ==
Aris Thessaloniki F.C. honours
Type	Competition	Titles	Seasons
Domestic	Super League Greece (first-tier)	3	1927–28, 1931–32, 1945–46
Domestic	Super League Greece 2 (second-tier)	1	1997–98
Domestic	Gamma Ethniki (third-tier)	1	2015–16
Domestic	Greek Cup	1	1969–70
Regional	Macedonia Championship	13	1922–23, 1923–24, 1925–26, 1927–28, 1928–29, 1929–30, 1930–31, 1933–34, 1937–38, 1945–46, 1948–49, 1952–53, 1958–59
Regional	Northern Greece Championship	4	1933, 1935, 1939, 1956

- record
- ^{S} Shared record

=== Minor & Unofficial Titles ===
- Greater Greece Cup
  - Winners (1): 1970–71

== Seasons in the 21st Century ==
Season	Category	Position	Cup	Notes
2000–01	Alpha Ethniki	7th	R16	
2001–02	Alpha Ethniki	9th	QF	
2002–03	Alpha Ethniki	6th	RU	Qualified for UEFA Cup
2003–04	Alpha Ethniki	13th	R16	
2004–05	Alpha Ethniki	14th	RU	Qualified for UEFA Cup
2005–06	Beta Ethniki	3rd	3R	
2006–07	Super League	4th	4R	Qualified for UEFA Cup
2007–08	Super League	4th	RU	Qualified for UEFA Cup
2008–09	Super League	6th	5R	
2009–10	Super League	4th	RU	Qualified for Europa League
2010–11	Super League	6th	4R	
2011–12	Super League	9th	R16	
2012–13	Super League	13th	3R	
2013–14	Super League	18th	R32	Relegated to Gamma Ethniki
2014–15	Gamma Ethniki (Group 1)	2nd	–	
2015–16	Gamma Ethniki (Group 1)	1st	–	Promoted to Football League
2016–17	Football League	3rd	R16	
2017–18	Football League	2nd	GS	Promoted to Super League
2018–19	Super League	5th	GS	Qualified for Europa League
2019–20	Super League	5th	SF	Qualified for Europa League
2020–21	Super League	**3rd**	QF	Qualified for UEFA Europa Conference League
2021–22	Super League	**3rd**	QF	Qualified for UEFA Europa Conference League
2022–23	Super League	5th	QF	Qualified for UEFA Europa Conference League
2023–24	Super League	5th	RU	
2024–25	Super League	5th	R16	Qualified for UEFA Conference League
2025–26	Super League	5th	QF	

Best position in bold.

Key: 3R = Third Round, 4R = Fourth Round, 5R = Fifth Round, GS = Group Stage, QF = Quarter-finals, SF = Semi-finals, RU = Runner-up.

== Aris Thessaloniki in Europe ==
Year	Competition	Round	Opponent	Home	Away	Qual.
1964–65	Inter-Cities Fairs Cup	First round	(Italy) Roma	0–0	0–3	
1965–66	Inter-Cities Fairs Cup	Second round	(West Germany) 1. FC Köln	2–1	0–2	
1966–67	Inter-Cities Fairs Cup	First round	(Italy) Juventus	0–2	0–5	
1968–69	Inter-Cities Fairs Cup	First round	(Malta) Hibernians	1–0	6–0	
1968–69	Inter-Cities Fairs Cup	Second round	(Hungary) Újpest	1–2	1–9	
1969–70	Inter-Cities Fairs Cup	First round	(Italy) Cagliari	1–1	0–3	
1970–71	European Cup Winners' Cup	First round	(England) Chelsea	1–1	1–5	
1974–75	UEFA Cup	First round	(Austria) Rapid Wien	1–0	1–3	
1979–80	UEFA Cup	First round	(Portugal) Benfica	3–1	1–2	
1979–80	UEFA Cup	Second round	(Italy) Perugia	1–1	3–0	
1979–80	UEFA Cup	Round of 16	(France) AS Saint-Étienne	3–3	1–4	
1980–81	UEFA Cup	First round	(England) Ipswich Town	3–1	1–5	
1981–82	UEFA Cup	First round	(Malta) Sliema Wanderers	4–0	4–2	
1981–82	UEFA Cup	Second round	(Belgium) K.S.C. Lokeren	1–1	0–4	
1994–95	UEFA Cup	Preliminary round	(Israel) Hapoel Be'er Sheva	3–1	2–1	
1994–95	UEFA Cup	First round	(Poland) GKS Katowice	1–0 (3–4 p.)	0–1	
1999–00	UEFA Cup	First round	Servette	1–1	2–1 (a.e.t)	
1999–00	UEFA Cup	Second round	(Spain) Celta de Vigo	2–2	0–2	
2003–04	UEFA Cup	First round	(Moldova) Zimbru Chișinău	2–1	1–1	
2003–04	UEFA Cup	Second round	(Italy) Perugia	1–1	0–2	
2005–06	UEFA Cup	First round	(Italy) Roma	0–0	1–5	
2007–08	UEFA Cup	First round	(Spain) Real Zaragoza	1–0	1–2	
2007–08	UEFA Cup	Group stage (Group 6)	(Serbia) Red Star Belgrade	3–0		
2007–08	UEFA Cup	Group stage (Group 6)	(England) Bolton Wanderers		1–1	
2007–08	UEFA Cup	Group stage (Group 6)	(Portugal) Braga	1–1		
2007–08	UEFA Cup	Group stage (Group 6)	(Germany) Bayern Munich		0–6	
2008–09	UEFA Cup	Second qualifying round	Slaven Belupo	1–0	0–2	
2010–11	Europa League	Third qualifying round	(Poland) Jagiellonia Białystok	2–2	2–1	
2010–11	Europa League	Play-off	Austria Wien	1–0	1–1	
2010–11	Europa League	Group stage (Group 2)	(Spain) Atlético Madrid	1–0	3–2	
2010–11	Europa League	Group stage (Group 2)	(Norway) Rosenborg	2–0	1–2	
2010–11	Europa League	Group stage (Group 2)	(Germany) Bayer 04 Leverkusen	0–0	0–1	
2010–11	Europa League	Round of 32	(England) Manchester City	0–0	0–3	
2019–20	Europa League	Second qualifying round	(Cyprus) AEL Limassol	0–0	1–0	
2019–20	Europa League	Third qualifying round	(Norway) Molde	3–1 (a.e.t.)	0–3	
2020–21	Europa League	Second qualifying round	(Ukraine) Kolos Kovalivka	1–2	—N/a	
2021–22	Europa Conference League	Second qualifying round	(Kazakhstan) Astana	2–1 (a.e.t.)	0–2	
2022–23	Europa Conference League	Second qualifying round	(Belarus) Gomel	5–1	2–1	
2022–23	Europa Conference League	Third qualifying round	(Israel) Maccabi Tel Aviv	2–1	0–2	
2023–24	Europa Conference League	Second qualifying round	Ararat-Armenia	1–0	1–1	
2023–24	Europa Conference League	Third qualifying round	(Ukraine) Dynamo Kyiv	1–0	1–2 (5–6 p.)	
2025–26	Conference League	Second qualifying round	(Azerbaijan) Araz-Naxçıvan	2–2	1–2	

=== Team statistics ===
Competition	App	Pld	W	D	L	GF	GA	GD
UEFA Europa League	13	53	21	15	17	69	75	–6
UEFA Europa Conference League	4	12	6	2	4	18	15	+3
UEFA Cup Winners' Cup	1	2	0	1	1	2	6	–4
Inter-Cities Fairs Cup	5	12	3	2	7	12	28	–16
Total	23	79	30	20	29	101	124	–23

Fully up to date as of 31 July 2025

== Managerial history ==
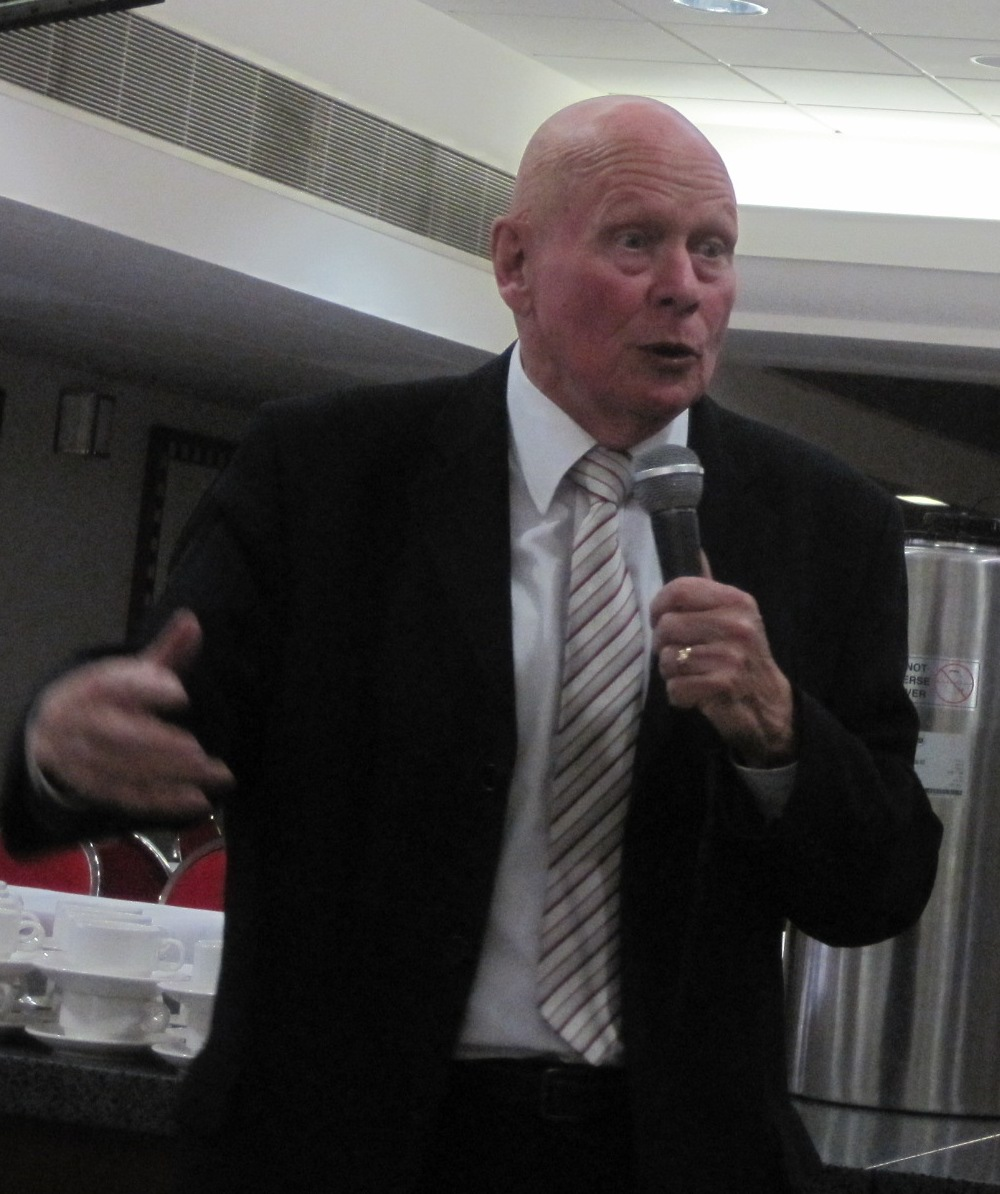
Wilf McGuinness

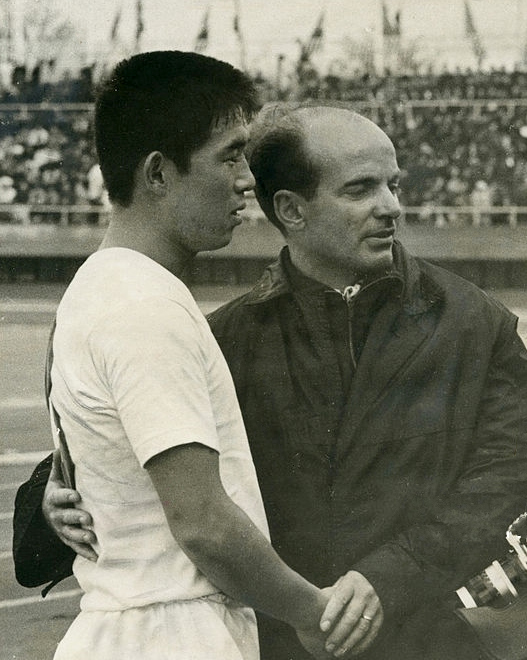
Dettmar Cramer

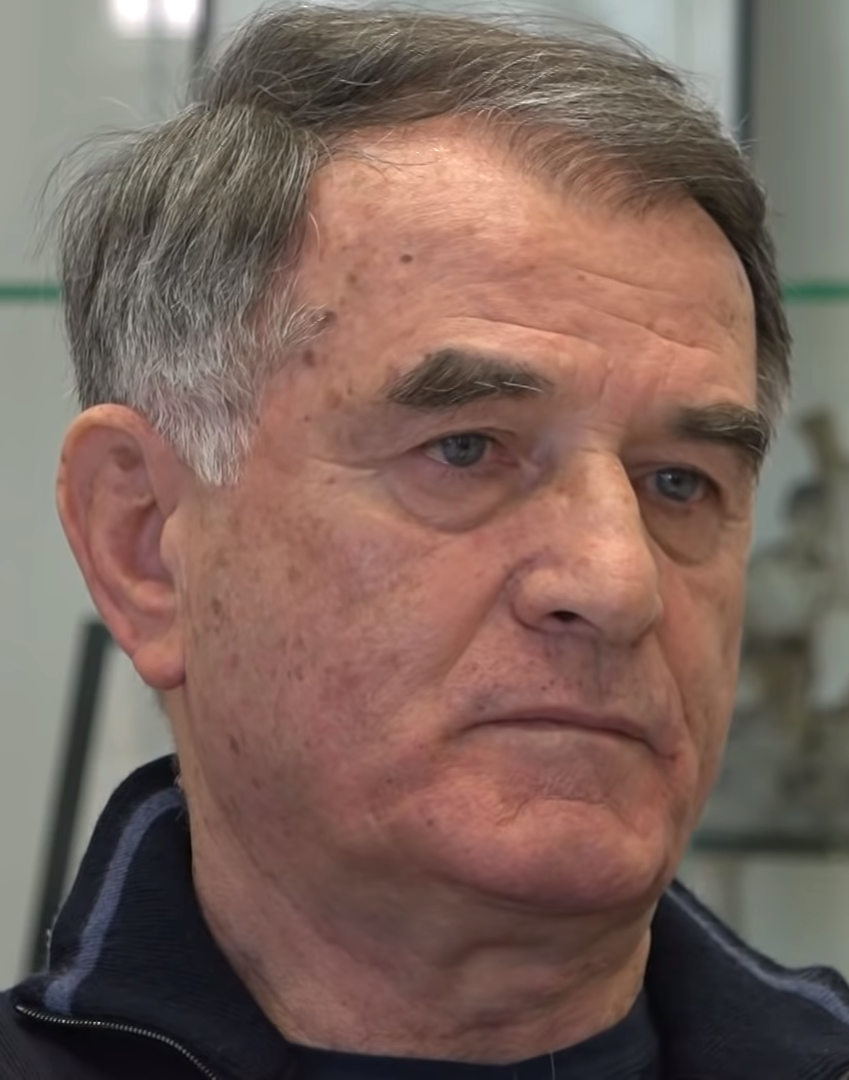
Dušan Bajević

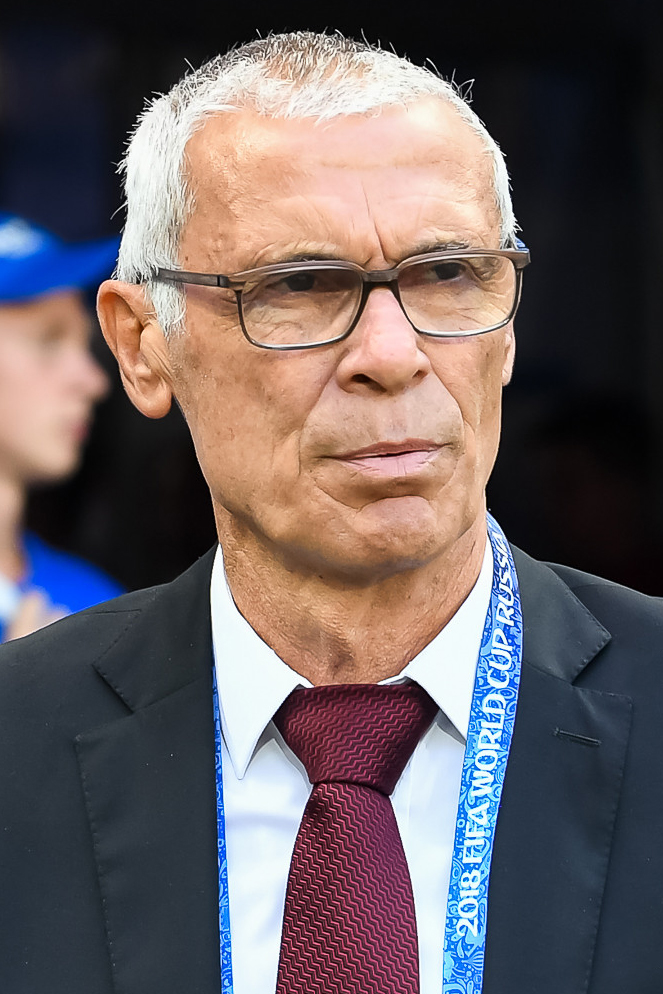
Héctor Cúper

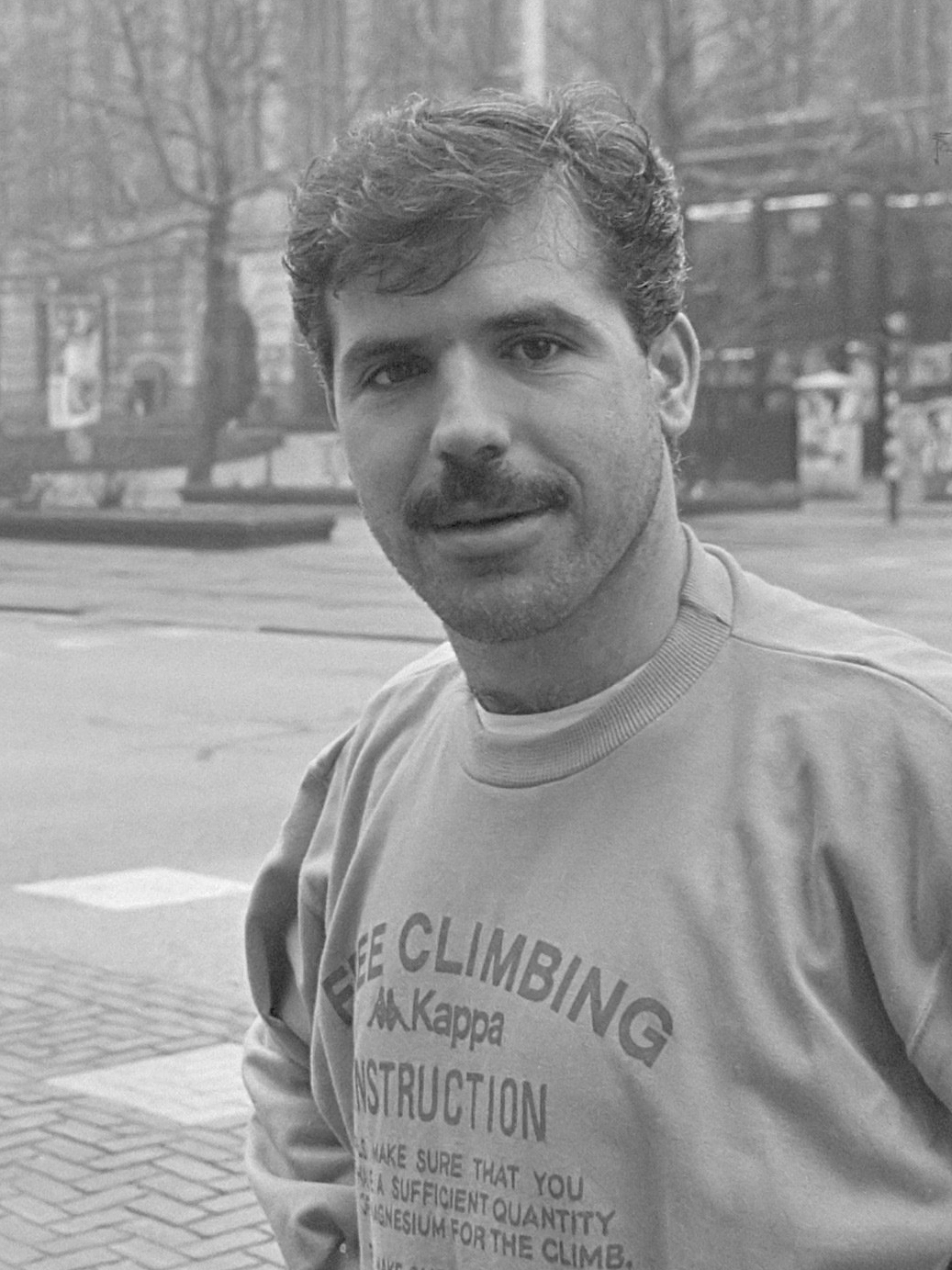
Nikos Anastopoulos

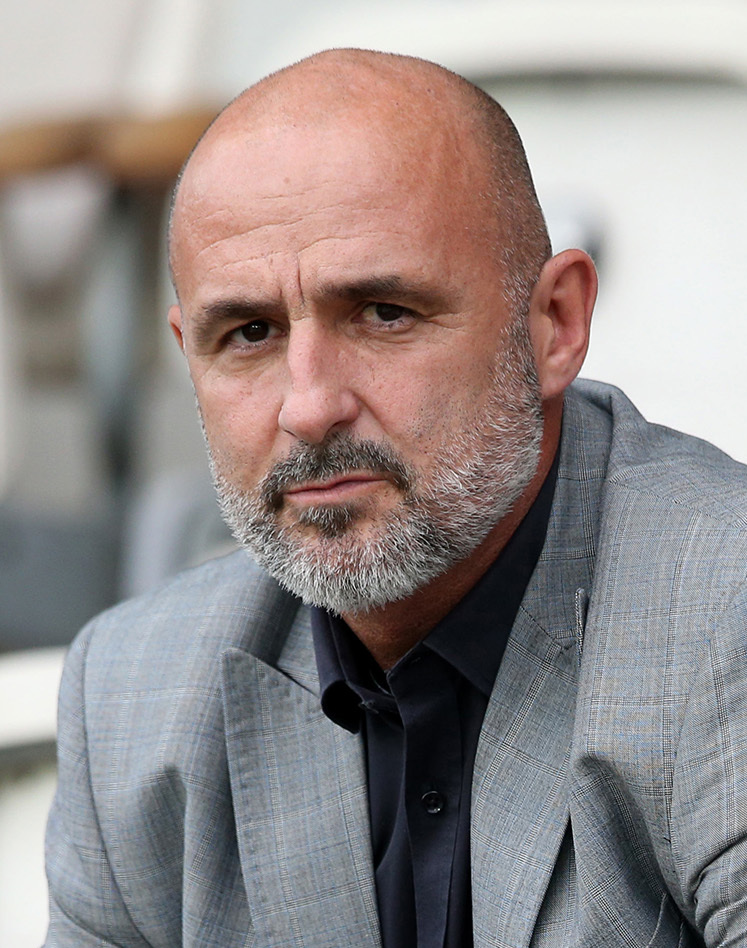
Michał Probierz

Name	Nationality	Year	Name	Nationality	Year	Name	Nationality	Year	Name	Nationality	Year
Grigoris Vlachopoulos	(Greece)	1914–22	Alketas Panagoulias	(Greece)	1975	Henri Michel	(France)	2001	Siniša Dobrašinović	(Cyprus)	2015
Kostas Vikelidis	(Greece)	1922–27	Dobromir Zhechev	(Bulgaria)	1975–76	Richard Tardy	(France)	2001–02	Dimitris Kalaitzidis	(Greece)	2015
Thomas Kössler	(Austria)	1927–29	Alketas Panagoulias	(Greece)	1976–77	Giannis Tzifopoulos	(Greece)	2001	Nikos Anastopoulos	(Greece)	2015–17
Valère de Besveconny (″De Valer″)	(Czechoslovakia)	1929–32	Panagiotis Patsidis	(Greece)	1977	Bernd Krauss	(Austria)	2002	Nikos Kostenoglou	(Greece)	2017
Kostas Vikelidis	(Greece)	1932	Carl-Heinz Rühl	(Germany)	1977	Giorgos Foiros	(Greece)	2002–03	Dimitrios Spanos	(Greece)	2017–18
Gyula Antal	(Hungary)	1932–34	Panagiotis Patsidis	(Greece)	1977–78	Giannis Michalitsos	(Greece)	2003	Paco Herrera	(Spain)	2018
Kostas Vikelidis	(Greece)	1934–40	Milovan Ćirić	(Socialist Federal Republic of Yugoslavia)	1978	Giorgos Pantziaras	(Cyprus)	2003	Savvas Pantelidis	(Greece)	2018–19
World War II			Apostol Čačevski	(Bulgaria)	1978–79	Ole Skouboe	(Denmark)	2003	Apostolos Terzis	(Greece)	2019
Dionysis Kaltekis	(Greece)	1945–49	José Sasía	(Uruguay)	1979–80	Makis Katsavakis	(Greece)	2003–04	Michael Oenning	(Germany)	2019–20
Iakovos Yakumis	(Greece)	1949–50	Frank Blunstone	(England)	1980	Giorgos Chatzaras	(Greece)	2004–05	Akis Mantzios	(Greece)	2020–22
Nikolaos Aggelakis	(Greece)	1950–53	Michal Vičan	(Czechoslovakia)	1980–81	Martti Kuusela	(Finland)	2005	Germán Burgos	(Argentina)	2022
Kleanthis Vikelidis	(Greece)	1953–55	Giannis Nalbantis	(Greece)	1981	Nikos Anastopoulos	(Greece)	2005–06	Apostolos Terzis	(Greece)	2022
Kiril Simonovski	(Socialist Federal Republic of Yugoslavia)	1955	Dettmar Cramer	(Germany)	1981–82	Guillermo Ángel Hoyos	(Argentina)	2006–07	Alan Pardew	(England)	2022–2023
Ernst Netuka	(Austria)	1955	Antonis Georgiadis	(Greece)	1982–84	Nikos Passialis	(Greece)	2006	Apostolos Terzis	(Greece)	2023
Aleksandar Petrović	(Socialist Federal Republic of Yugoslavia)	1955–56	Kostas Chatzikostas	(Greece)	1984	Quique Hernández	(Spain)	2006–07	Akis Mantzios	(Greece)	2023–2024
Mladen Kašanin	(Socialist Federal Republic of Yugoslavia)	1956	Thijs Libregts	(Netherlands)	1984–86	Juan Oliva	(Spain)	2007	Marinos Ouzounidis	(Greece)	2024–2025
Ivan Stevović	(Socialist Federal Republic of Yugoslavia)	1956–57	Giannis Venos	(Greece)	1986	Dušan Bajević	(Bosnia and Herzegovina)	2007–08	Manolo Jiménez	(Spain)	2025–2026
Kleanthis Vikelidis	(Greece)	1957	Gojko Zec	(Socialist Federal Republic of Yugoslavia)	1986–87	Quique Hernández	(Spain)	2008–09	Michalis Grigoriou	(Greece)	2026–
Ivan Stevović	(Socialist Federal Republic of Yugoslavia)	1957–58	Klimis Gounaris	(Greece)	1987	Mazinho	(Brazil)	2009			
Dionysis Kaltekis	(Greece)	1958	Gerd Prokop	(Germany)	1987–88	Dimitris Bugiuklis	(Greece)	2009			
Carl Panagl	(Austria)	1958	Alketas Panagoulias	(Greece)	1988–90	Héctor Cúper	(Argentina)	2009–11			
Kleanthis Vikelidis	(Greece)	1958–59	Kostas Tsilios	(Greece)	1990	Giannis Michalitsos	(Greece)	2011			
Svetislav Glišović	(Socialist Federal Republic of Yugoslavia)	1959–61	Jacek Gmoch	(Poland)	1990–91	Sakis Tsiolis	(Greece)	2011			
Kleanthis Vikelidis	(Greece)	1961	Kostas Tsilios	(Greece)	1991	Michał Probierz	(Poland)	2011–12			
Kostas Velliadis	(Greece)	1961	Ivan Vutsov	(Bulgaria)	1991–92	Giorgos Semertzidis; Giannis Michalitsos	(Greece) (Greece)	2012			
Ljubiša Spajić	(Socialist Federal Republic of Yugoslavia)	1961–62	Giorgos Foiros	(Greece)	1992–96	Giorgos Semertzidis; Giannis Michalitsos	(Greece) (Greece)	2012			
Vasilis Grigoriadis	(Greece)	1962	Giannis Tzifopoulos	(Greece)	1996	Manuel Machado	(Portugal)	2012			
Ettore Trevisan	(Italy)	1962	Jozef Jarabinský	(Czechoslovakia)	1996	Makis Katsavakis	(Greece)	2012			
Bela Palfi	(Socialist Federal Republic of Yugoslavia)	1962–66	Stavros Diamantopoulos	(Greece)	1996–97	Nikos Passialis; Dimitris Bugiuklis	(Greece)	2012			
Svetislav Glišović	(Socialist Federal Republic of Yugoslavia)	1966–67	Giorgos Semertzidis; Giorgos Pantziaras	(Greece) (Cyprus)	1997	Nikos Passialis; Dimitris Bugiuklis	(Greece)	2012			
Severiano Correia	(Portugal)	1967–69	Giorgos Semertzidis; Giorgos Pantziaras	(Greece) (Cyprus)	1997	Lucas Alcaraz	(Spain)	2012–13			
Nikolaos Aggelakis	(Greece)	1969	Juan Ramón Rocha	(Argentina)	1997	Giannis Michalitsos	(Greece)	2013			
Milovan Ćirić	(Socialist Federal Republic of Yugoslavia)	1969–70	Giorgos Foiros	(Greece)	1997–98	Soulis Papadopoulos	(Greece)	2013			
Michalis Baltatzis	(Greece)	1970	Georgios Paraschos	(Greece)	1998	Giannis Chatzinikolaou	(Greece)	2013			
Milovan Ćirić	(Socialist Federal Republic of Yugoslavia)	1970–71	Alketas Panagoulias	(Greece)	1998–99	Zoran Milinković	(Serbia)	2013			
Michalis Baltatzis	(Greece)	1971	Ilija Petković	(Serbia)	1999–00	Soulis Papadopoulos	(Greece)	2013–14			
Les Allen	(England)	1971	Giorgos Semertzidis; Giannis Michalitsos	(Greece) (Greece)	2000	Giorgos Foiros	(Greece)	2014			
Wilf McGuinness	(England)	1971–73	Giorgos Semertzidis; Giannis Michalitsos	(Greece) (Greece)	2000	Dimitris Kalaitzidis	(Greece)	2014			
Branko Stanković	(Socialist Federal Republic of Yugoslavia)	1973–75	Babis Tennes	(Greece)	2000–01	Paulo Campos	(Brazil)	2014–15			

== Statistics ==
=== League top scorers ===
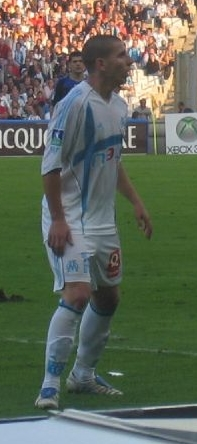
Sergio Koke

Player	Goals
(Greece) Dinos Kouis	141
(Greece) Alekos Alexiadis	127
(Greece) Kostas Papaioannou	65
(Greece) Konstantinos Drampis	48
(Greece) Georgios Zindros	46
(Greece) Vasilis Dimitriadis	46

=== Most league appearances ===
Player	Matches
(Greece) Dinos Kouis	473
(Greece) Theodoros Pallas	368
(Greece) Christos Nalbantis	303
(Greece) Georgios Firos	303
(Greece) Giannis Venos	303

=== Most goals in a League match ===
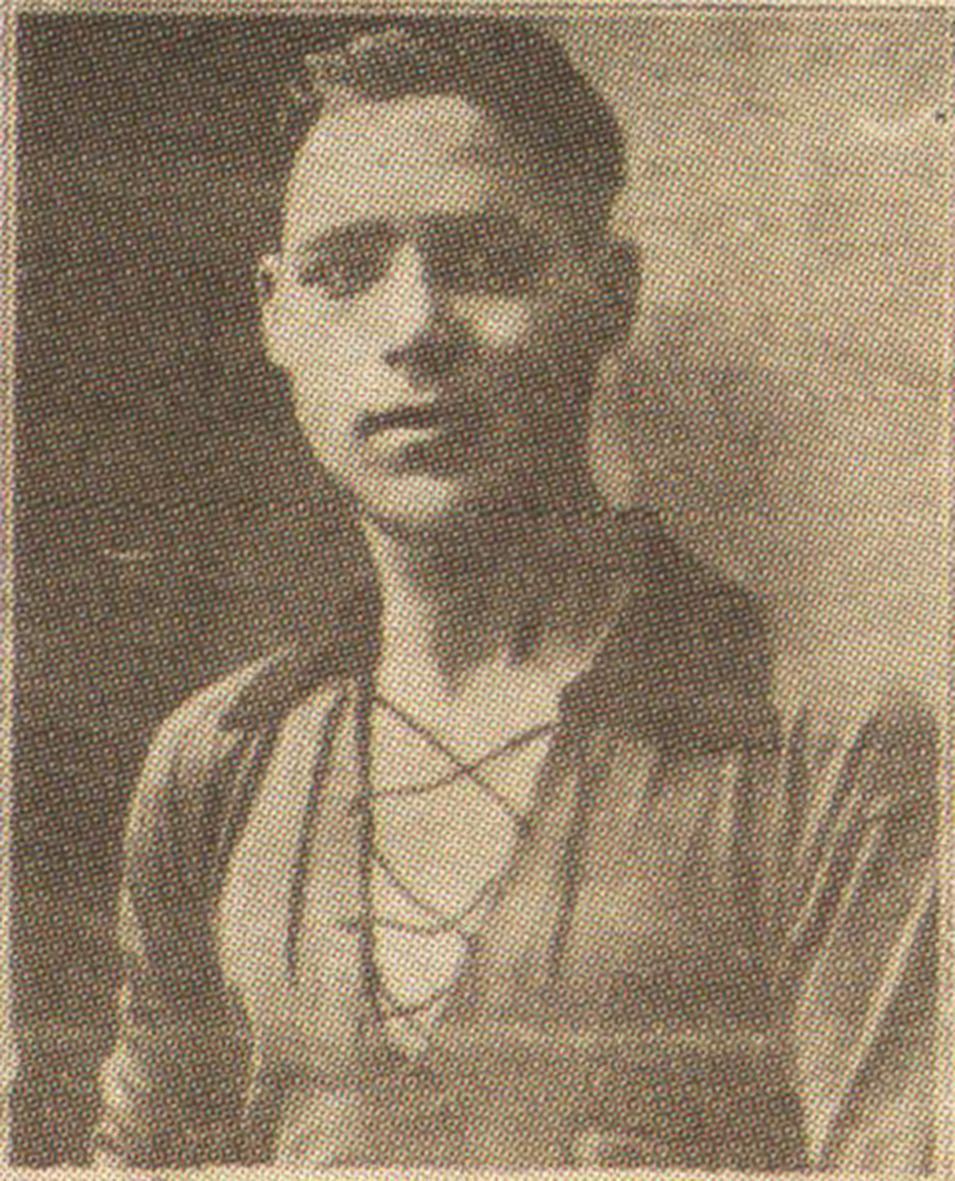
Nikolaos Angelakis

Player	Record
Nikolaos Angelakis	6 goals (10 April 1932, Aris vs Apollon Smyrnis: 6–1)

=== Super League top scorers ===
Rank.	Nationality	Player	Times	Seasons
1	(Greece)	Nikos Kitsos	3	1931, 1932, 1934
2	(Greece)	Dinos Kouis	1	1981
3	(Greece)	Nikolaos Angelakis	1	1928
4	(Greece)	Kleanthis Vikelidis	1	1946
5	(Greece)	Vasilis Grigoriadis	1	1949
6	(Spain)	Loren Morón	1	2024

== Personnel ==
=== Ownership and current board ===
Position	Staff
Owner	(Greece) Amani Swiss
President & CEO	(Greece) Irini Karipidou
Vice President	(Greece) Panagiotis Biliris
Board member	(Greece) Panagiotis Pissanidis

=== Coaching staff ===
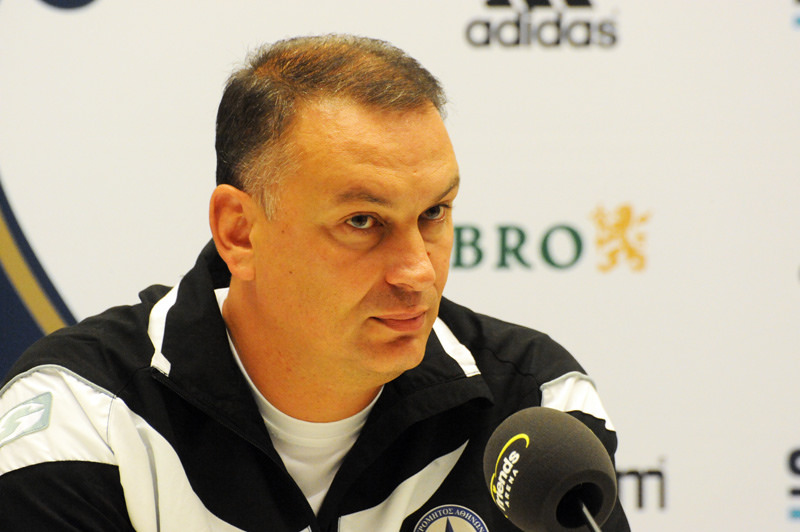
Michalis Grigoriou is the team's current head coach.

Position	Staff
Head coach	(Greece) Michalis Grigoriou
Assistant coach	(Greece) Sifis Venakis
Fitness coach	(Greece) Nikiforos Belagiannis
Goalkeeper coach	(Greece) Georgios Skiathitis
Analysts	(Greece) Kleanthis Efstathiadis (Greece) Dimitris Mouras

== Aris Thessaloniki presidents ==
Years	Name
1979–80	(Greece) Menelaos Chatzigeorgiou
1980–82	(Greece) Christos Kallen
1982–84/1992–93/1997–00	(Greece) Vangelis Ioannides
1984–85	(Greece) Kyriakos Maravellias
1985–90	(Greece) Dimos Dasigenis
1991–92	(Greece) Dimitris Iliades
1993–94/2000–02	(Greece) Nikos Tsarouchas
1994–97	(Greece) Lambros Grantas
2000–01	(Greece) Panagiotis Spyrou
2001–02	(Greece) Giannis Zachoudanis
2002–03	(Greece) Alketas Panagoulias
2003–04	(Greece) Sotiris Karaberis
2004–05	(Greece) Nikitas Matthaiou
2005–09	(Greece) Lambros Skordas
2009–12	(Greece) Thanasis Athanasiadis
2012–13	(Greece) Giannis Psifidis
2013	(Greece) Dimitris Iliadis
2014	(Greece) Giorgos Galanos
2015–22	(Greece) Theodoros Karipidis
2022–	(Greece) Irini Karipidou

== See also ==
- Aris Thessaloniki
- Aris BC
- Aris Volleyball Club
