= Ludovisi Ares =

Roman marble sculpture of Mars

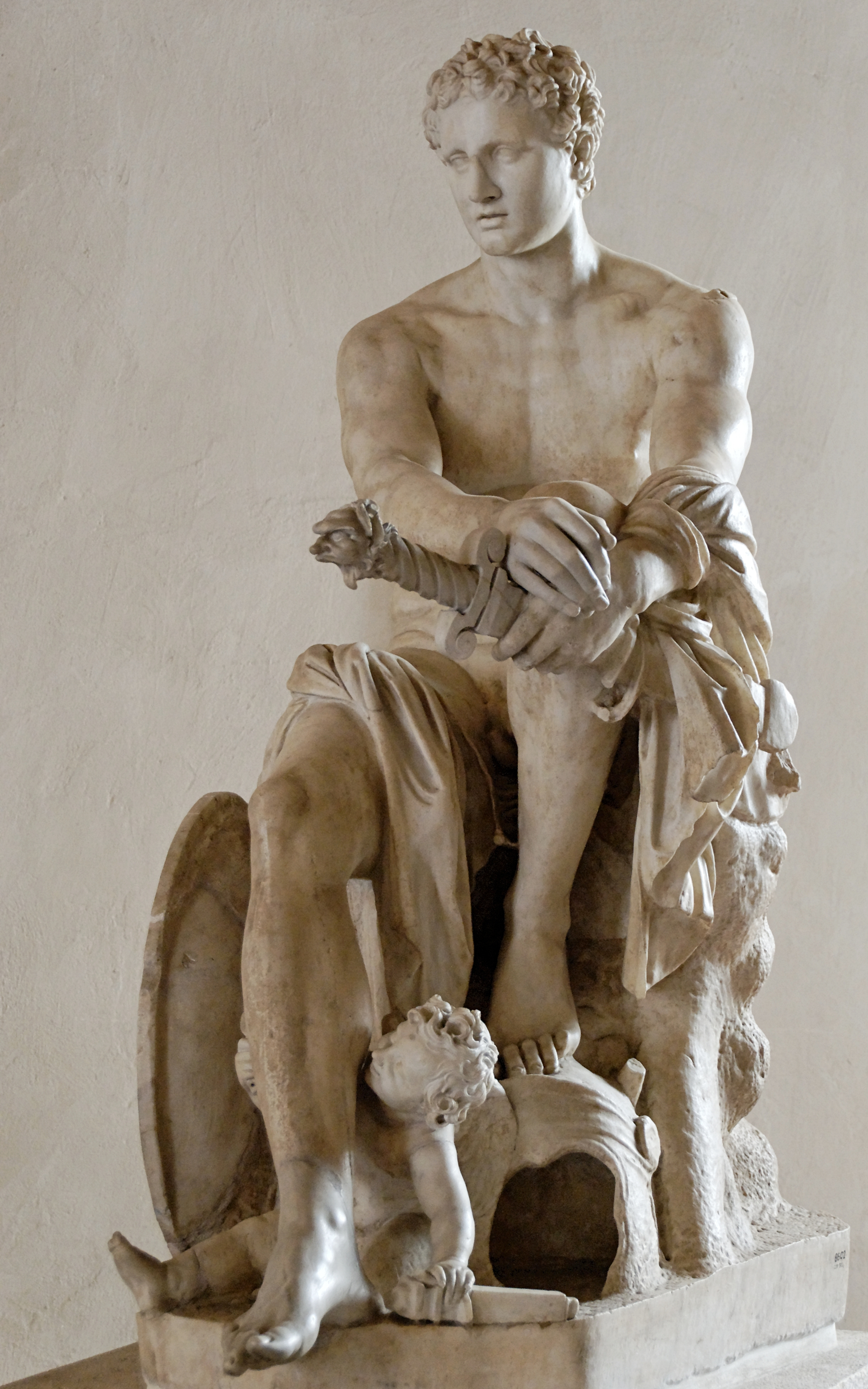
- The Ludovisi Ares
- Artist: Lysippus
- Year: 2nd-century copy
- Catalogue: 11.3
- Type: Sculpture
- Medium: Marble
- Location: National Museum of Rome, Rome

The Ludovisi Ares is an Antonine Roman marble sculpture of Ares, a fine 2nd-century copy of a late 4th-century BCE Greek original, associated with Scopas or Lysippus: thus the Roman god of war receives his Greek name, Ares.

Ares/Mars is portrayed as young and beardless and seated on a trophy of arms, while an Eros plays about his feet, drawing attention to the fact that the god of war, in a moment of repose, is presented as a love object. The 18th-century connoisseur Johann Joachim Winckelmann, a man with a practiced eye for male beauty, found the Ludovisi Ares the most beautiful Mars that had been preserved from Antiquity, when he wrote the catalogue of the Ludovisi collection.

Rediscovered in 1622, the sculpture was apparently originally part of the temple of Mars (founded in 132 BCE in the southern part of the Campus Martius), of which few traces remain, for it was recovered near the site of the church of San Salvatore in Campo. Pietro Santi Bartoli recorded in his notes that it had been found near the Palazzo Santa Croce in Rione Campitelli during the digging of a drain. (Haskell and Penny 1981:260) The sculpture found its way into the collection formed by Cardinal Ludovico Ludovisi (1595–1632) the nephew of Pope Gregory XV at the splendid villa and gardens he built near Porta Pinciana, on the site where Julius Caesar and his heir, Octavian (Caesar Augustus), had had their villa. The sculpture was lightly restored by the young Bernini, who refinished its surfaces and discreetly provided a right foot; he was probably largely responsible for the cupid, which Haskell and Penny note was omitted from G.F. Susini's bronze replica and from the prints of the sculpture in Maffei's anthology.

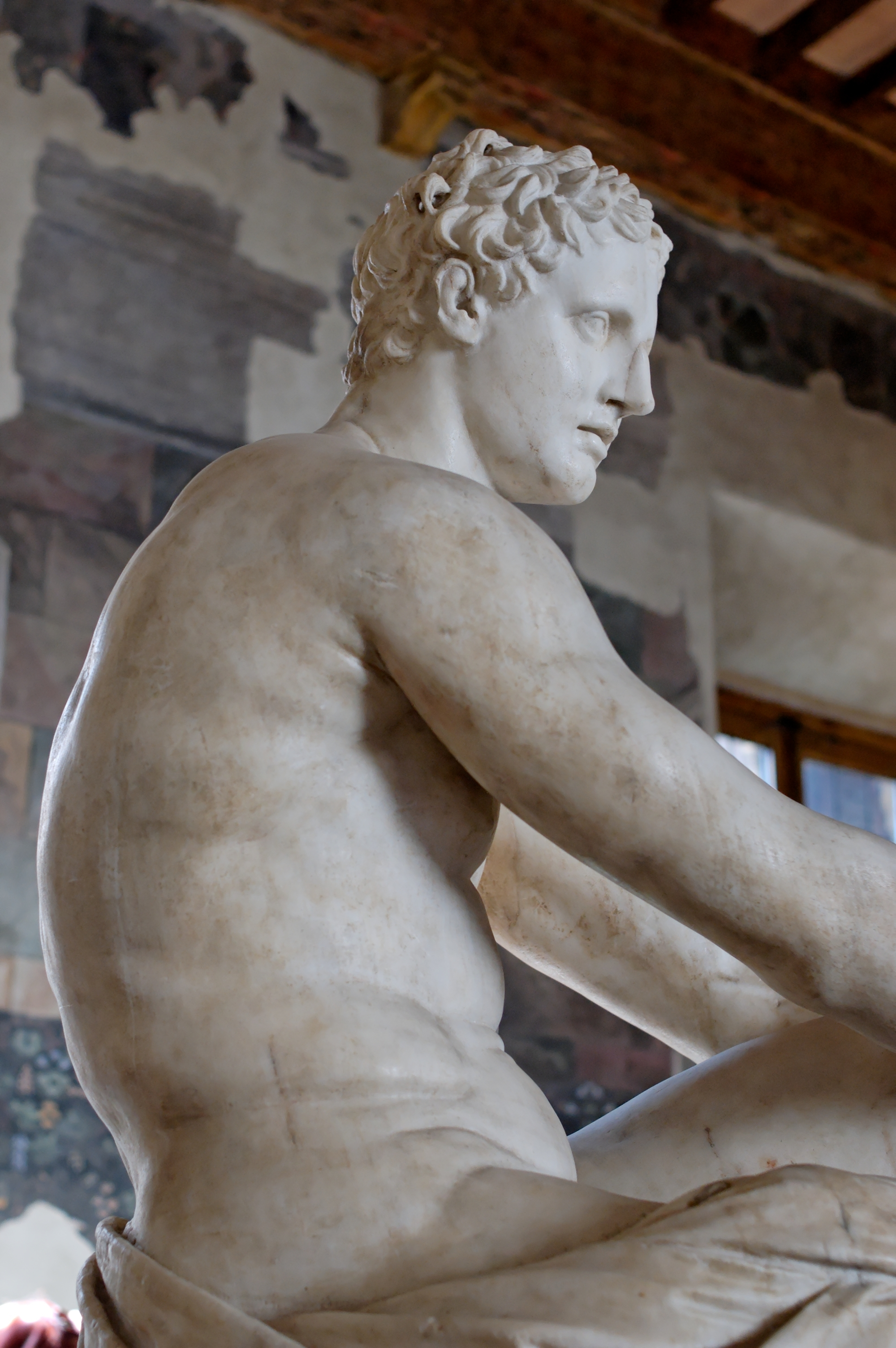
The Ludovisi Ares

The sculpture was a sensational find. A small-scale bronze replica of it was executed by G.F. Susini, heir and assistant to his more famous uncle Antonio Susini, when he visited Rome in the 1630s and copied several marbles from Ludovisi's collection; a bronze of the Ludovisi Ares is in the Ashmolean Museum, Oxford. Later, the Ludovisi Ares was one of the featured antiquities to be seen on the "grand tour". For example, the portrait of English tourist John Talbot (later first Earl Talbot) by Pompeo Batoni depicts him next to the statue to display his culture and showing his familiarity with great works of art. Less expensive representations could be found: Giambattista Piranesi's son Francesco made an engraving of it at the Villa Ludovisi in 1783 . Casts of the Ludovisi Ares found their way into early museum collections, such as the Copenhagen Glyptotek and were influential to several generations of Neoclassical and academic students.

In 1901, the eventual heir, Prince Rodolfo Boncompagni-Ludovisi, put the Ludovisi antiquities up for sale. The Italian state purchased 104 of the objects, and the rest have been dispersed among the museums of Europe and the US. The Ares is conserved in the section of the National Museum of the Terme that is housed in Palazzo Altemps, Rome.

A depiction of the statue is used as an emblem for the Greek athletic club Aris Thessaloniki.

== See also ==
- List of works by Gian Lorenzo Bernini
