= 1969–70 Greek Football Cup =

1969–70 Greek Cup
Tournament details
- Country: Greece
- Teams: 72

Final positions
- Champions: Aris (1st title)
- Runners-up: PAOK

The 1969–70 Greek Football Cup was the 28th edition of the Greek Football Cup. The competition culminated with the Greek Cup Final, held at Lysandros Kaftanzoglou Stadium, on 28 June 1970. The match was contested by Aris and PAOK, with Aris winning by 1–0.

== Calendar ==
From the last qualifying round onwards:

Round	Date(s)	Fixtures	Clubs	New entries
Last qualifying round	19, 20, 26, 27 February 1970	17	50 → 33	34
Second round	23 March 1970	16	33 → 17	16
Additional round	8 April 1970	1	17 → 16	none
Round of 16	29 April 1970	8	16 → 8	none
Quarter-finals	1970	4	8 → 4	none
Semi-finals	1970	2	4 → 2	none
Final	28 June 1970	1	2 → 1	none

== Last qualifying round ==
Team 1	Score	Team 2
Olympos Kerkyra	0–2	A.F.C. Patra
Apollon Athens	4–2	Panchiakos
Egaleo	3–2	Irodotos
Kallithea	3–0	Atlas Mytilene
Kilkisiakos	3–0	Orchomenos
Panegialios	2–1	Kerkyra
Anagennisi Karditsa	0–1	Trikala
Apollon Litochoro	2–1	Aris Ptolemaidas
Panserraikos	5–1	Vyron Kavala
Apollon Kalamarias	3–0	Orestis Orestiada
Anagennisi Arta	2–1	Kalamata
Pannafpliakos	3–2	Panargiakos
Panthrakikos	2–1	Pandramaikos
Kavala	1–0	Akrites Sykies
Lamia	1–0	Aris Agios Konstantinos
Digenis Koskinou Rhodes	2–3 (a.e.t.)	Vyzas Megara

• The last 16 of previous season's Cup qualified for the 2nd round.

== Knockout phase ==
In the knockout phase, teams play against each other over a single match. If the match ends up as a draw, extra time will be played. If a winner doesn't occur after the extra time the winner emerges by penalty shoot-out.
The mechanism of the draws for each round is as follows:

- In the draw for the second round, the teams that had qualified to previous' season Round of 16 are seeded and the clubs that passed the qualification round are unseeded.
- In the draws for the additional round onwards, there are no seedings, and teams from the same group can be drawn against each other.

== Second round ==
Team 1	Score	Team 2
Panelfsiniakos	1–0	Panachaiki
Panthrakikos	0–1	Olympiacos Volos
Egaleo	3–2	Lamia
AEK Athens	1–1 (3–5 p)	Panathinaikos
Atromitos	2–0	Pannafpliakos
A.P.S. Patras	0–1	Aris
Pierikos	2–1 (a.e.t.)	Panserraikos
Kallithea	0–0 (4–1 p)	Kilkisiakos
Kavala	1–0	Ethnikos Piraeus
PAOK	5–1	Makedonikos
Trikala	7–0	Apollon Litochoro
OFI	2–1 (a.e.t.)	Panegialios
Panionios	1–0	Iraklis
Olympiacos	1–0	Apollon Athens
Apollon Kalamarias	1–0	Anagennisi Arta
Panetolikos	0–3	Vyzas Megara
Olympiakos Nicosia	bye	

== Additional round ==
Team 1	Score	Team 2
Olympiakos Nicosia	0–2	Atromitos

== Bracket ==
Round of 16
Apollon Kalamarias	0
Olympiacos	2
Kavala	0
OFI	1
Kallithea	1
Atromitos	0
Aris	2
Panathinaikos	1
PAOK	4
Pierikos	0
Olympiacos Volos	0
Panionios	1
Vyzas Megara	2
Trikala	3
Panelefsiniakos	0(7)
Egaleo (p)	0(8)

Quarter-finals
Olympiacos	3
OFI	1
Kallithea	1
Aris	3
PAOK	1
Panionios	0
Trikala	0
Egaleo	1

Semi-finals
Olympiacos	0
Aris	1
PAOK	1
Egaleo	0

Final
Aris	1
PAOK	0

== Round of 16 ==
Team 1	Score	Team 2
Aris	2–1	Panathinaikos
PAOK	4–0	Pierikos
Vyzas Megara	2–3	Trikala
Apollon Kalamarias	0–2	Olympiacos
Panelefsiniakos	0–0 (7–8 p)	Egaleo
Kallithea	1–0	Atromitos
Olympiacos Volos	0–1	Panionios
Kavala	0–1	OFI

== Quarter-finals ==
Team 1	Score	Team 2
Olympiacos	3–1	OFI
Kallithea	1–3	Aris
PAOK	1–0	Panionios
Trikala	0–1	Egaleo

== Semi-finals ==
Team 1	Score	Team 2
Olympiacos	0–1	Aris
PAOK	1–0	Egaleo

== Final ==
28 June 1970
20:30 EEST

Aris	1–0	PAOK
Keramidas 8'	Report (page 5)

Kaftanzoglio Stadium, Thessaloniki
Attendance: 46,695
Referee: Christos Michas (Athens)
