= Aris Thessaloniki Ice Hockey Club =

- City: Thessaloniki, Greece
- League: Greek Ice Hockey Championship
- Founded: 1985
- Colours: Yellow & Black
- General manager: Sideropoulos Bobby
- Head coach: Malamas Dimitrios
- Website: http://www.arisac.gr
Home colours	Away colours

Franchise history
- 1985–1988: Thessaloniki Penguins
- 1988–1993: Aris Thessaloniki Penguins
- 2004–2008: Thessaloniki Titans
- 2008-present: Aris Thessaloniki Ice Hockey Club

Aris Thessaloniki Ice Hockey Club is an ice hockey team in Thessaloniki, Greece. They play in the Greek Ice Hockey Championship. They were founded in 1985 and initially known as Thessaloniki Penguins.

== History ==
The team was founded in 1985 as Thessaloniki Penguins. In 1989, they joined the Aris Thessaloniki sports club and being known as the Aris Thessaloniki Penguins, they managed to win the first 3 Greek Ice Hockey Championships held, the inaugural Greek championship in 1989, and continued their dominance, winning the 1990 and 1991 Greek championships. They also participated in the 1990–91 IIHF European Cup. They finished in last place in Group A, losing 26–1 to Levski-Spartak Sofia, and 30–0 to HC Steaua Bucuresti. After a last-place finish in 1993, the club folded, likewise to most other ice hockey clubs, due to financial difficulties, and the championship was cancelled until 2000.

In 1997, the club was reformed as Thessaloniki Titans and in 2003 joined again Aris as the Aris Thessaloniki Ice Hockey Club. Since then, they participated in 2010, finishing 2nd and in 2011 winning again the tournament.

== Season-by-season record ==
=== Ice Hockey ===
Year	Position	Notes
1989	1st	
1990	1st	
1991	1st	
1992	did not participate	^{[A]}
1993	4th	
1994–1999	not held	^{[B]}
2000	did not participate	^{[C]}
2001–2007	not held	^{[D]}
2008	did not participate	^{[E]}
2009	did not participate	^{[F]}
2010	2nd	
2011	1st	

Notes:

A. In 1991–92, Aris and most other teams did not participate in a championship tournament and Iptamenoi Pagodromoi Athinai claimed the title, being the sole club to declare participation.

B. Most teams folded due to financial reasons and no championships were held between 1994 and 1999.

C. Only two Athenian teams participated.

D. The championship was not held between 2001 and 2007, due to lack of an ice rink and an adequate number of ice hockey teams.

E. Aris was not invited/allowed to participate

F. Aris was not allowed to participate

=== Inline hockey ===
Balkan Amateur Hockey League: 2009 – Champions

CERH European League:
2004 – 7th place
2005 – Qualification Round
2006 – Qualification Round
2007 – Qualification Round

Greek Inline Roller Hockey Championship (G.I.R.H.L.):
2008 – 2nd place
2009 – 1st place – Champions
2010 – not held
2011 – not finished

Greek Inline Hockey Cup:
2007 – Cup Winner
2008 – Cup Winner
2009 – Cup Winner
2010 – not held
2011 – not held

=== Ball hockey ===
Greek Ball Hockey League:
2009 – 1st place – Champions
2010 – not held
2011 – not finished
