= 2012–13 Greek Ice Hockey Championship season =

The 2012-13 Greek Ice Hockey Championship was contested by 11 teams, divided into Northern and Southern groups. The top two teams in each group were supposed to advance to the playoffs, which ended up being cancelled. PAOK Thessaloniki HC finished first in the Northern Group and Iptameni Pagodromoi Athens won the Southern Group, and were later named overall Greek champions.

== Regular season ==
=== Northern Group ===
	Club	GP	W	OTW	OTL	L	Goals	Pts
1.	PAOK Thessaloniki HC	7	6	1	0	0	148:20	20
2.	Aris Thessaloniki	6	5	0	1	0	107:16	16
3.	Iraklis Thessaloniki	8	4	0	0	4	57:84	12
4.	Huskies Thessaloniki	8	2	0	0	6	36:124	6
5.	Panserraikos HC	8	0	0	0	8	34:137	0

=== Southern Group ===
	Club	GP	W	OTW	OTL	L	Goals	Pts
1.	Iptameni Pagodromoi Athens	10	10	0	0	0	128:13	30
2.	Albatros Athens	10	8	0	0	2	98:37	24
3.	Avantes Athens	10	5	0	0	5	46:54	15
4.	Mad Kows HC Athens	10	4	0	0	6	50:48	12
5.	Tarandos Athens	10	3	0	0	7	57:84	9
6.	Warriors Athens	10	0	0	0	10	20:164	0

== Playoffs ==
The two Northern Group teams who had qualified for the playoffs declined to participate. As a result, the playoffs were cancelled, and the Greek Federation declared Iptameni Pagodromoi Athens, winner of the Southern Group, Greek champion for 2013.
