= 1993 Greek Ice Hockey Championship season =

The 1993 Greek Ice Hockey Championship season was the fifth season of the Greek Ice Hockey Championship. Four teams participated in the league, and Iptameni Pagodromoi Athen won their second league title.

== Regular season ==
Pl.		GP	W	T	L	GF–GA	Pts
1.	Iptameni Pagodromoi Athen	6	6	0	0	75:8	12
2.	Tarandos Moschatou	6	3	1	2	35:42	7
3.	PAS Piraeus	6	2	0	4	15:50	4
4.	Aris Saloniki	6	0	1	5	5:30	1
