= Aris Thessaloniki =

Multisports club in Greece

AC Aris Thessaloniki
- Full name: Athletic Club Aris Thessaloniki; Αθλητικός Σύλλογος Άρης Θεσσαλονίκης
- Nicknames: God of War
- Founded: 25 March 1914 as Football Club Aris Thessaloniki
- Colours: Yellow, Black
- Anthem: Aris Niketes (Ares Victorious)
- Chairman: Lefteris Arvanitis
- Club titles: European Titles: 3 Balkan Titles: 1
- Website: aris.gr

Athlitikos Syllogos Aris Thessalonikis, means Athletic Club Aris Thessaloniki (Greek: Αθλητικός Σύλλογος Άρης Θεσσαλονίκης), is a major Greek multi-sport club founded on 25 March 1914 in Thessaloniki.

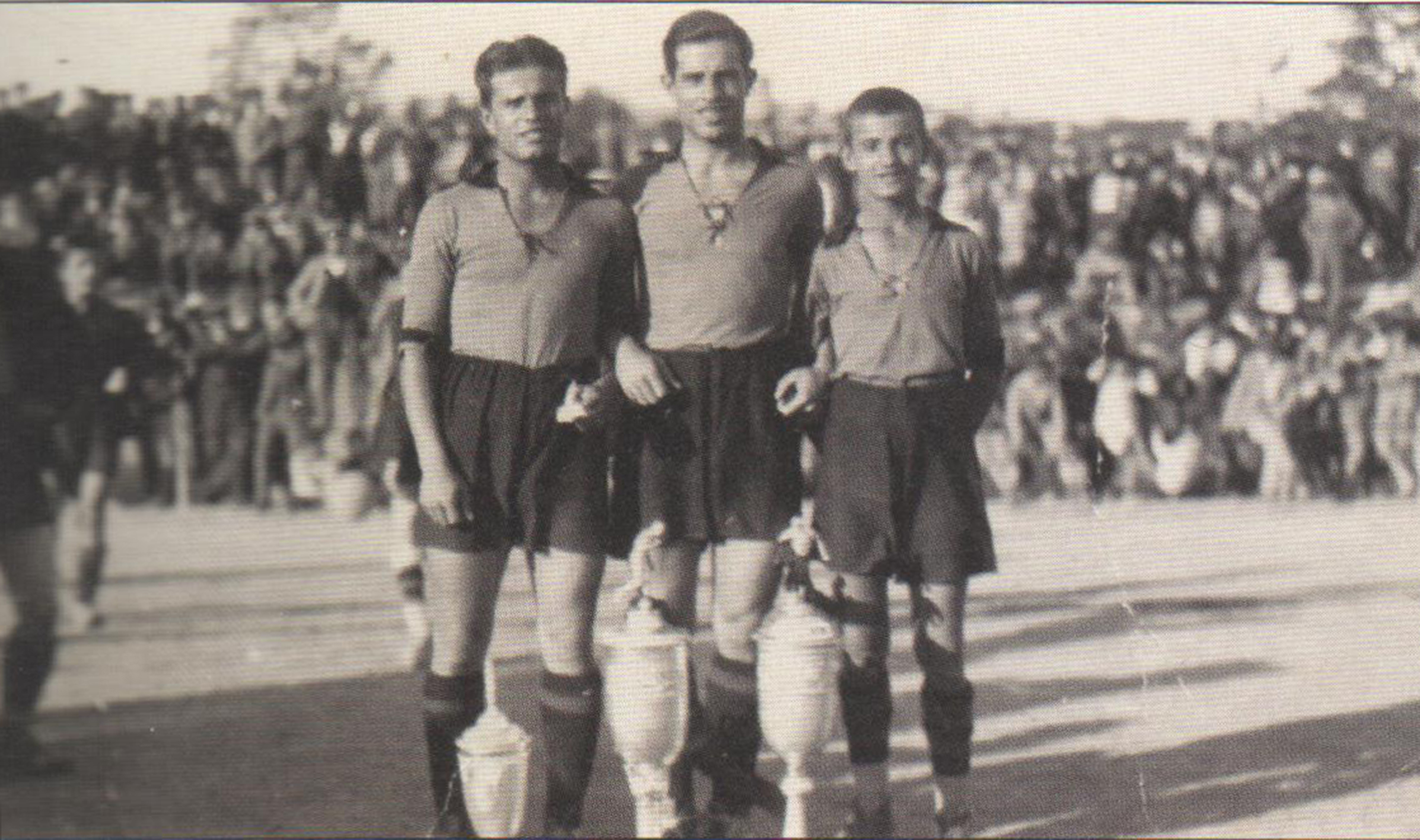
Nikiphoros, Kostas and Kleanthis Vikelidis (1930)

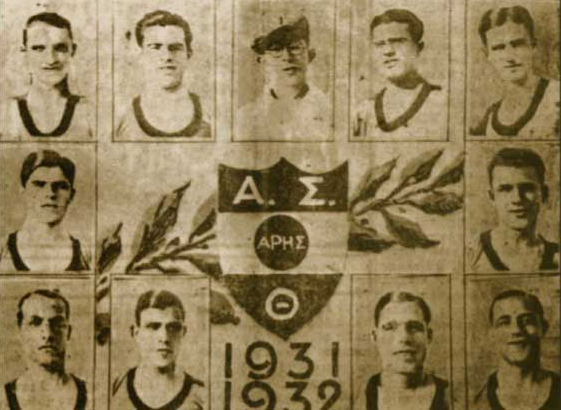
Old poster with the champion team of Aris Thessaloniki (1931–32 season)

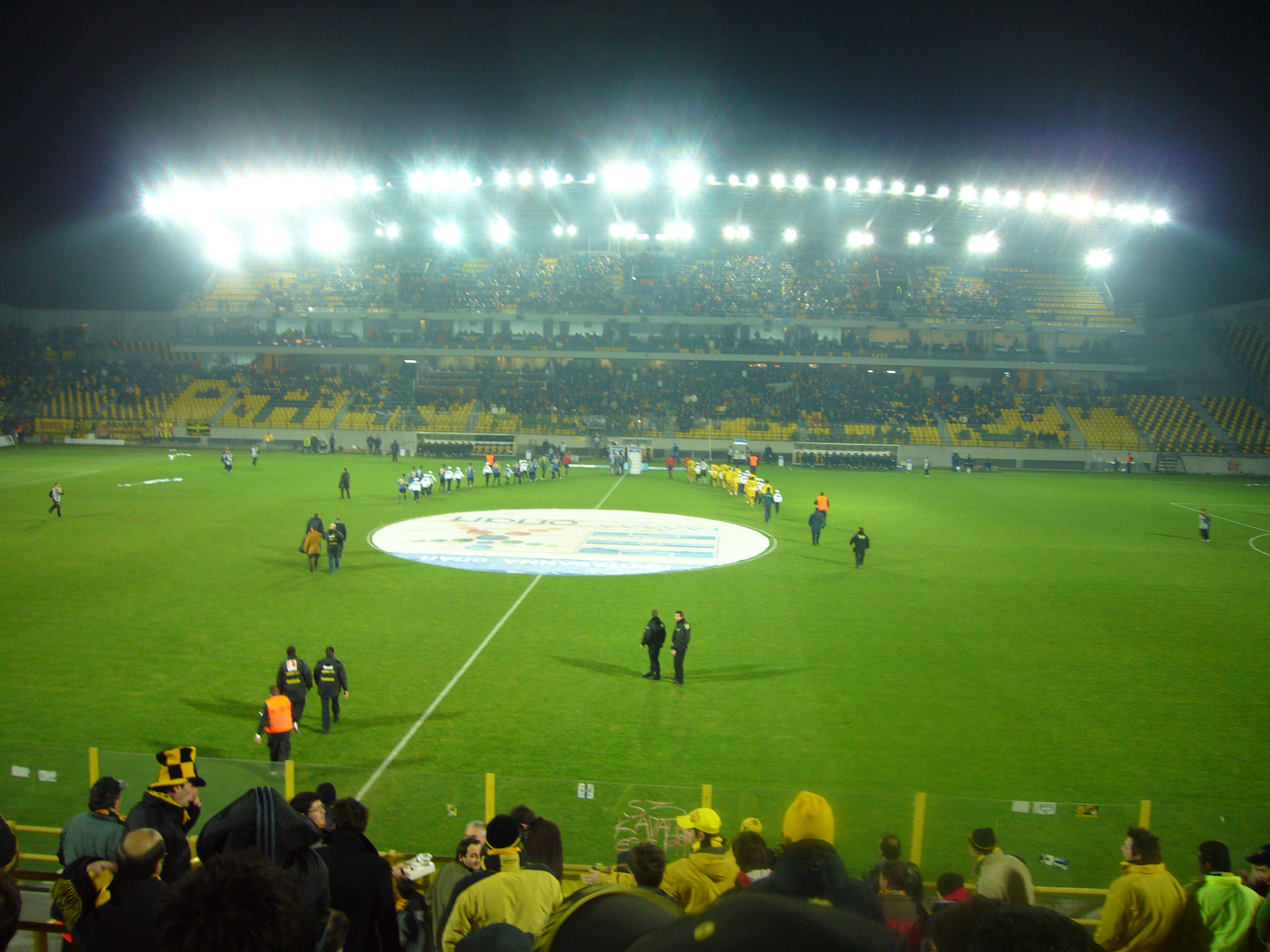
Kleanthis Vikelides Stadium

Aris Thessaloniki are nicknamed "The God of War, was one of the strongest Greek clubs during the Interwar period winning national championships in football, basketball and water polo. As of 2026, the club maintains a long-standing presence in Greek basketball, and played a significant role in the development of the sport in Greece with the players like Nikos Galis and which was voted the best Greek team of the 20th century in a poll conducted by Ethnos.

== Departments ==
Aris is considered to be one of the most important Greek sport clubs and today maintains departments in many sports, including:

- Aris FC - Football
- Aris BC - Basketball
- Aris Volleyball Club - Volleyball
- Aris Water Polo - Water Polo
- Aris Baseball - Baseball
- Aris Ice Hockey - Ice Hockey

== Honours ==
=== Football ===
- Super League Greece
  - Winners (3): 1927–28, 1931–32, 1945–46
  - Runners-up (3): 1929–30, 1932–33, 1979–80
- Greek Cup
  - Winners (1): 1969–70
  - Runners-up (9): 1931–32, 1932–33, 1939–40, 1949–50, 2002–03, 2004–05, 2007–08, 2009–10, 2023–24
- Greater Greece Cup (Defunct)
  - Winners (1): 1971

=== Basketball ===
- Greek League

Winners (10): 1929–30, 1978–79, 1982–83, 1984–85, 1985–86, 1986–87, 1987–88, 1988–89, 1989–90, 1990–91
Runners-up (8): 1928–29, 1957–58, 1958–59, 1964–65, 1965–66, 1975–76, 1981–82, 1983-84

- Greek Cup

Winners (8): 1984–85, 1986–87, 1987–88, 1988–89, 1989–90, 1991–92, 1997–98, 2003–04
Runners-up (6): 1983–84, 1992–93, 2002–03, 2004–05, 2013–14, 2016–17

- Greek Super Cup

Winners (1): 1986

- FIBA Saporta Cup / EuroCup Basketball

Winners (1): 1992–93
Runners-up (1): 2005–06

- FIBA Korać Cup (defunct)

Winners (1): 1996–97

- FIBA EuroCup Challenge

Winners (1): 2002–03

=== Volleyball ===
Greek Volleyball League:

- Winners (1): 1996–97
- Runners-up (2): 1993–94, 1995–96,

Greek Super Cup:

- Winners (1): 1997

=== Waterpolo ===
- Greek League
  - Winners (4): 1927–28, 1928–29, 1929–30, 1931–32
  - Runners-up (1): 1930–31

=== Weightlifting ===
- 2 Greek championships, Women: 1994, 1995

=== Ice Hockey ===
- 4 Greek Championships: 1989, 1990, 1991, 2011

=== Korfball ===
- 1 Greek Championship:2007
- 1 Greek Cup: 2007
- 1 'Beach Korfball Championship: 2008

=== Ball Hockey ===
- 1 Greek Championship: 2009

=== Roller Hockey ===
- 1 Greek Championship:2009
- 3 Greek Cups: 2007, 2008, 2009
- 1 Balkan Cup: 2009

=== Swimming ===
- 1 Greek Championship, Women: 1994

=== Boxing ===
- 1 Greek Championship, Men: 1972

=== Athletics ===
- 1 Greek Indoor Championship, Women: 1991
- 1 Greek Cup, Women: 1988
- 2 Greek Cross Country Championship, Women: 1961, 1962

== Anthem ==
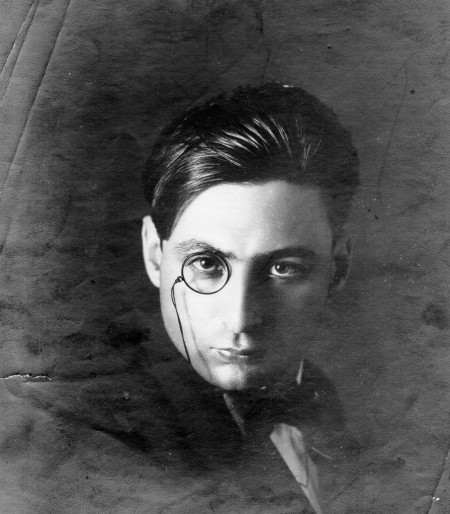
Emilios Riadis

The hymn of Aris or Aris Niketes (Ares Victorious) is the anthem of the club. It was written in 1926. The lyrics were written by Georgios Kitsos and the music by Secondo Poselli, son of the famous architect Vitaliano Poselli. The orchestration was made by the famous classic composer Emilios Riadis.

== Notable athletes ==
- Football: Nikolaos Aggelakis, Kostas Vikelidis, Nikiphoros Vikelidis, Nikos Kitsos, Argyris Argyriadis, Kleanthis Vikelidis, Kostas Veliadis, Manolis Keramidas, Takis Loukanidis, Alketas Panagoulias, Konstantinos Drampis, Giorgos Zindros, Stelios Papafloratos, Theodoros Pallas, Alekos Alexiadis, Dinos Kouis, Vasilis Dimitriadis, Apostolos Liolidis, Traianos Dellas, Angelos Charisteas, Avraam Papadopoulos, Sergio Koke, Darcy Dolce Neto, Javito, Vangelis Platellas
- Basketball: Manthos Matthaiou, Faidon Matthaiou, Anestis Petalidis, Michalis Romanidis, Vangelis Alexandris, Charis Papageorgiou, Nikos Filippou, Stojko Vranković, Vassilis Lipiridis, Lefteris Subotić, Giannis Ioannidis, Panagiotis Giannakis, Nikos Galis, Miroslav Pecarski, Roy Tarpley, Harold Ellis, Walter Berry, José Ortiz, Charles Shackleford, Dinos Angelidis, Panagiotis Liadelis, Giorgos Sigalas, Will Solomon, Nestoras Kommatos, Jeremiah Massey, Bryant Dunston, Kostas Sloukas, Kostas Papanikolaou, Sasha Vezenkov
- Volleyball: Lyubomir Ganev, Plamen Konstantinov, Michalis Alexandropoulos, Giannis Melkas, Thanassis Moustakidis, Dimitris Modiotis, Kostas Prousalis, Nikos Smaragdis, Riley Salmon, Clayton Stanley
- Water polo: Stelios Dimitriou, Agisilaos Zografos, Fotis Zografos

== European honours ==
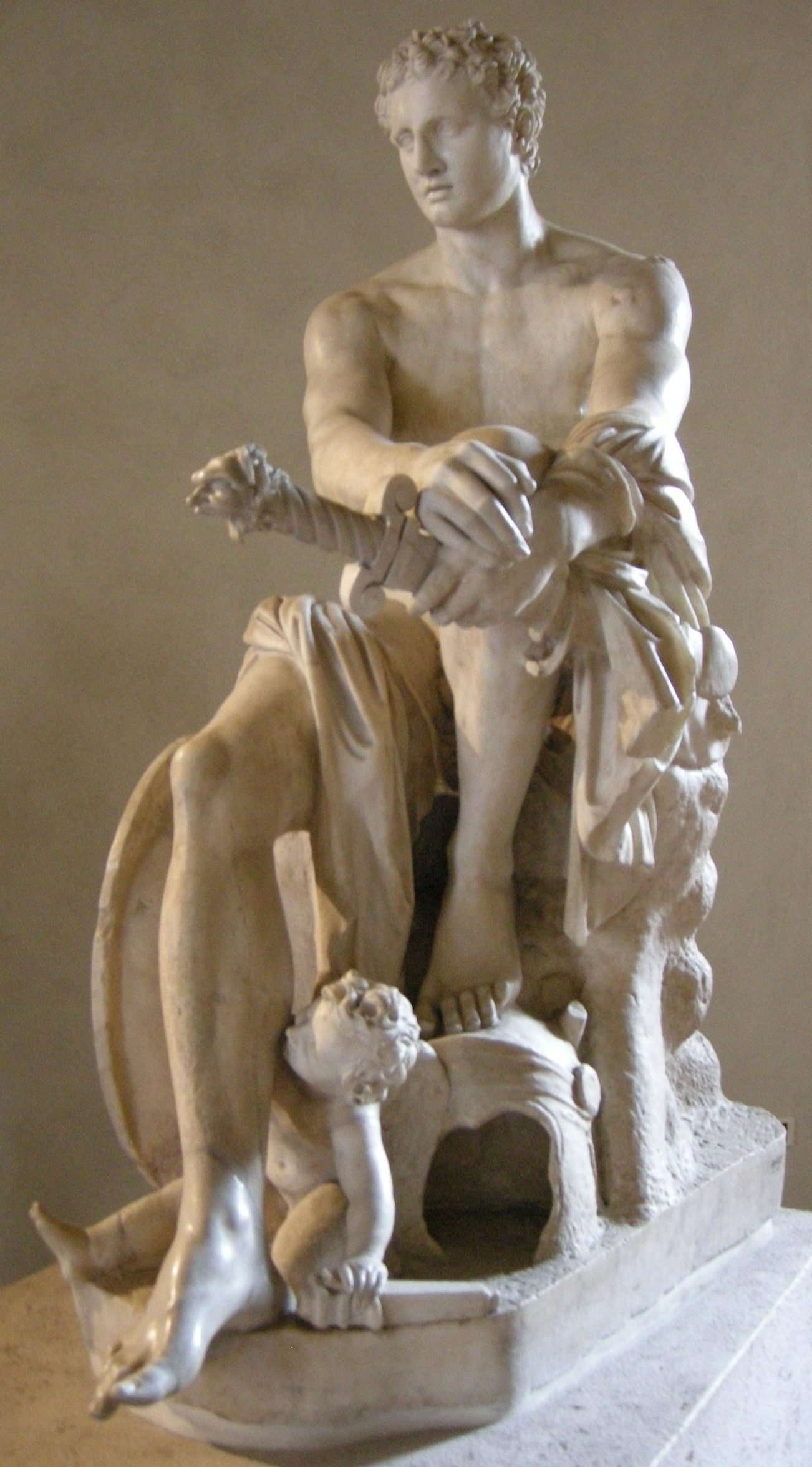
Wrestling Ares, emblem of the club

Season	Basketball	Volleyball	Roller Hockey
1984–85	FIBA Korać Cup; Semi-finals		
1987–88	Euroleague; 4th place		
1988–89	Euroleague; 3rd place		
1989–90	Euroleague; 4th place		
1992–93	FIBA Saporta Cup; Winners	CEV Cup; Semi-finals	
1993–94	FIBA Saporta Cup; Semi-finals		
1994–95		CEV Cup; Semi-finals	
1996–97	FIBA Korać Cup; Winners		
1998–99	FIBA Saporta Cup; Semi-finals		
2002–03	FIBA EuroCup Challenge; Winners		
2005–06	Eurocup; Final		
2008–09		Balkans Cup Final	Balkan Cup Winners

== Notable supporters ==
- Arthur Abrahamian, President of the Armenian Community of Thessaloniki
- Vangelis Alexandris, basketball player and coach, former Aris captain
- Anthimos Ananiadis, actor
- Lelos Arouch, prominent member of the Jewish Community of Thessaloniki
- Loukas Barlos, entrepreneur, former AEK president
- Albert Bourla, chief executive officer (CEO) of Pfizer
- Yiannis Boutaris, entrepreneur, fmr. owner of Aris basketball club, fmr. Mayor of Thessaloniki
- Angelos Charisteas, footballer, member of the UEFA Euro 2004 winning team, scorer of the winner in the Final
- Spyros Charitatos, journalist
- Kostas Chrysogonos, jurist, Member of the European Parliament
- Giannis Dardamanelis, Mayor of Kalamaria
- Dimos Dasygenis, knitting entrepreneur, whom the Aris training center ("Dasygenio") was named after
- Serafeim Dedeoglou, significant entrepreneur, creator of luxury hotels in Thessaloniki
- Georgios Delizisis, footballer, former Aris captain
- Vangelis Diamantopoulos, fmr. SYRIZA MP
- Efstratios Evgeniou, Chalkidiki Flour Mills SA's Chairman & CEO
- B.D. Foxmoor, rapper and hip hop producer
- Giorgos Foiros, football player and coach, former Aris captain
- Christos Galileas, artistic director of Thessaloniki Concert Hall
- Nikos Galis, member of the FIBA Hall of Fame and Naismith Memorial Basketball Hall of Fame, 1987 European champion
- Kostas Gioulekas, fmr. Minister of Internal Affairs
- Dimitris Goulielmos, entrepreneur, owner of Aris basketball club
- Evangelos Grammenos, president of the Hellenic Football Federation (EPO)
- Agamemnon Gratzios, fmr. Chief of the Hellenic National Defence General Staff
- Aris Grigoriadis, world aquatics champion
- Giannis Ioannidis, basketball player and coach, Greek Champion with Aris, fmr. Aris captain, fmr. Deputy Minister of Sport
- Paris Kalimeridis, former sports journalist
- Ignatios Kaitezidis, Mayor of Panorama
- Sotiris Kalivatsis, actor
- Merkouris Karaliopoulos, boyhood fan, former Aris footballer
- Panagiotis Katsiaros, boyhood fan, former Aris footballer
- Giorgos Zindros, former Aris footballer
- Giannis Tzifopoulos, former Aris footballer and coach
- Vassilis Kechagias, President of the Greek Film Critics Association (PEKK)
- Georgios Koltsidas, former Aris footballer and captain
- Lambros Konstantaras, journalist
- Giorgos Konstantopoulos, President of the Greek Exporters Association (SEVE)
- Dinos Kouis, footballer, former Aris captain
- Vladimiros Kyriakidis, actor, former Aris youth basketball player
- Zoe Laskari, actress
- Nikos Laskaris, entrepreneur, former Aris basketball club owner
- Katerina Laspa, journalist, TV host
- Michalis Leanis, journalist
- Giorgos Lentzas, journalist, TV host
- Giannis Logothetis, emblematic sports commentator
- Christos Lolas, pioneer cardiac surgeon
- Renia Louizidou, actress
- Nikos Makropoulos, singer
- Apostolos Mangiriadis, journalist
- Marinella, singer
- Rodolfo Maslias, Head of TermCoord of the European Parliament
- Faidon Matthaiou, basketball player and coach, FIBA EuroBasket Bronze medalist, the "Patriarch" of Greek basketball
- Antypas (Masloumidis), singer
- Michalis Mitrousis, actor
- Giorgos Moukidis, composer and songwriter
- Fanis Mouratidis, actor
- Thomas Nazlidis, footballer, former Aris player, team manager
- Alexandros Nikolaidis, Olympic medalist in Tae Kwon Do
- Alketas Panagoulias, fmr. US and Greece national football team manager, Aris player and coach
- Andreas Papacharalambous, Mayor of Strovolos, Cyprus
- Elena Papadimitriou, journalist
- Charis Papageorgiou, top scorer and champion in basketball
- Vasilis Papageorgopoulos, 100 metres athlete, European champion, fmr. Mayor of Thessaloniki
- Evelina Papoulia, actress
- Nikos Pasialis, former Aris footballer
- Anestis Petalidis, basketball player and coach, longest-serving Aris coach, the Patriarch of the basketball department
- Akis Petretzikis, celebrity chef
- Ntinos Pontikas, footballer, youngest ever hat-trick scorer
- Secondo Poselli, composer of the Hymn of Aris Thessaloniki, son of Vitaliano Poselli
- Panagiotis Psomiadis, politician, former MP
- Emilios Riadis, significant composer and poet
- Konstantinos-Christoforos Rodokanakis, physician and essayist
- Thomas Rompopoulos, former MP with PASOK
- Akis Sakellariou, actor
- Katerina Sakellaropoulou, President of the Hellenic Republic
- Nikolaos Sakellaropoulos, fmr. VP of the Supreme Civil and Criminal Court of Greece
- Trifon Samaras, celebrity hairdresser, hair stylits
- Margaritis Schinas, vice-president of the European Commission
- Thanasis Papazoglou, international footballer
- Nikos Dabizas, fmr. international footballer, technical director
- Antonis Sapountzis, fmr. Aris footballer
- Marios Siampanis, footballer, fmr. Aris goalkeeper
- Panagiotis Spyrou, pioneer cardiac surgeon
- Katerina Stanisi, singer
- Nikos Tachiaos, Chairman of Attiko Metro SA
- Kyriakos Thomaidis, journalist, TV host
- Periklis Traios, sports commentator, facilities manager at NTNG
- Ioanna Triantafyllidou, actor
- Nicholas Trimmatis, London based real estate entrepreneur
- Thanasis Tsaltabasis, actor
- Vassilis Tsitsanis, leading composer of rebetiko
- Vasilis Tsivilikas, actor
- Nikos Valergakis, fmr. President of Thessaloniki Bar Association
- Foteini Velesiotou, singer
- Kleanthis Vikelidis, footballer, former Aris captain, Greek champion and topscorer
- Michalis Zorpidis, President of the Professional Chamber of Thessaloniki (EETH)

== AC Αris Thessaloniki Presidents ==
Name	Years
1914–16	Minos Kydonakis
1916–23	Dimitris Ioannidis
1923–28	Lefteris Iliadis
1928–30	Giannis Angelou
1930–31	Lefteris Iliadis
1931–34	Petros Louvaris
1934–35	Nikos Kasapis
1935–36	Lefteris Iliadis
1936–37	Giorgos Paraskevaidis
1937–38	Panagiotis Kosmatopoulos
1938–41	Manthos Matthaiou
1945-46	Giannis Angelou
1946–47	Stelios Kazantzis
1947–52	Giannis Angelou
1952–53	Grigoris Chatziantoniou
1953–54	Elias Oplopoios
1954–55	Giannis Angelou
1955-57	Stergios Jiuvanakis
1957–58	Giannis Angelou
1958–59	Grigoris Chatziantoniou
1959–60	Giannis Cholevas
1960–62	Nikiphoros Vikelidis
1962–63	Stergios Jiuvanakis
1963–64	Giannis Cholevas
1964–67	Giorgos Grigoriadis
1967–69	Kostas Vikelidis
1969–72	Nikos Kampanis
1972–73	Menelaos Chatzigeorgiou
1973–74	Nikos Kampanis
1974–75	Giorgos Grigoriadis
1975–76	Nikos Kampanis

Name	Years
1977–79	Apostolos Georgiadis
1979–81	Dimitris Souliadis
1981–83	Evangelos Mellisaris
1983–90	Akis Michailidis
1990–92	Akis Michailidis, Panagiotis Spyrou
1992–93	Lefteris Chatzopoulos
1993–95	Athanasios Papavasileiou
1995–96	Athanasios Adamopoulos
1996–98	Lefteris Chatzopoulos
1998–00	Giannis Chortis
2000–01	Theodoros Athanasiadis
2001–03	Michalis Zorpidis
2003–06	Nikitas Matthaiou
2006–14	Nikos Papadopoulos
2014	Charis Papageorgiou
2014–15	Tasos Economou
2015–	Giannis Psifidis

== Gallery ==
Football

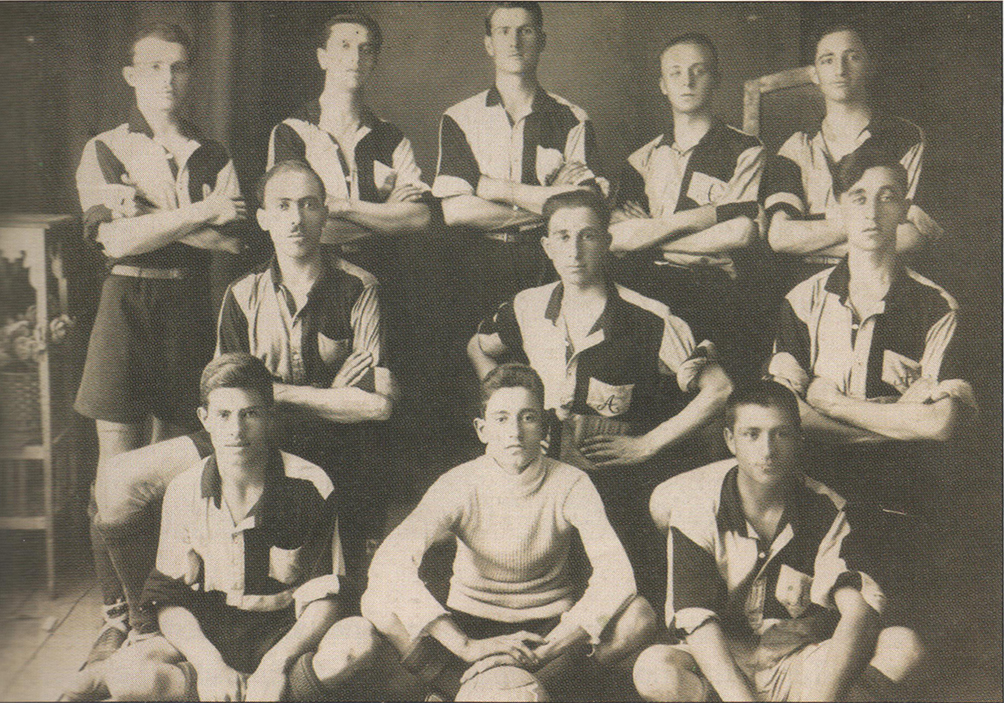
Aris, 1923

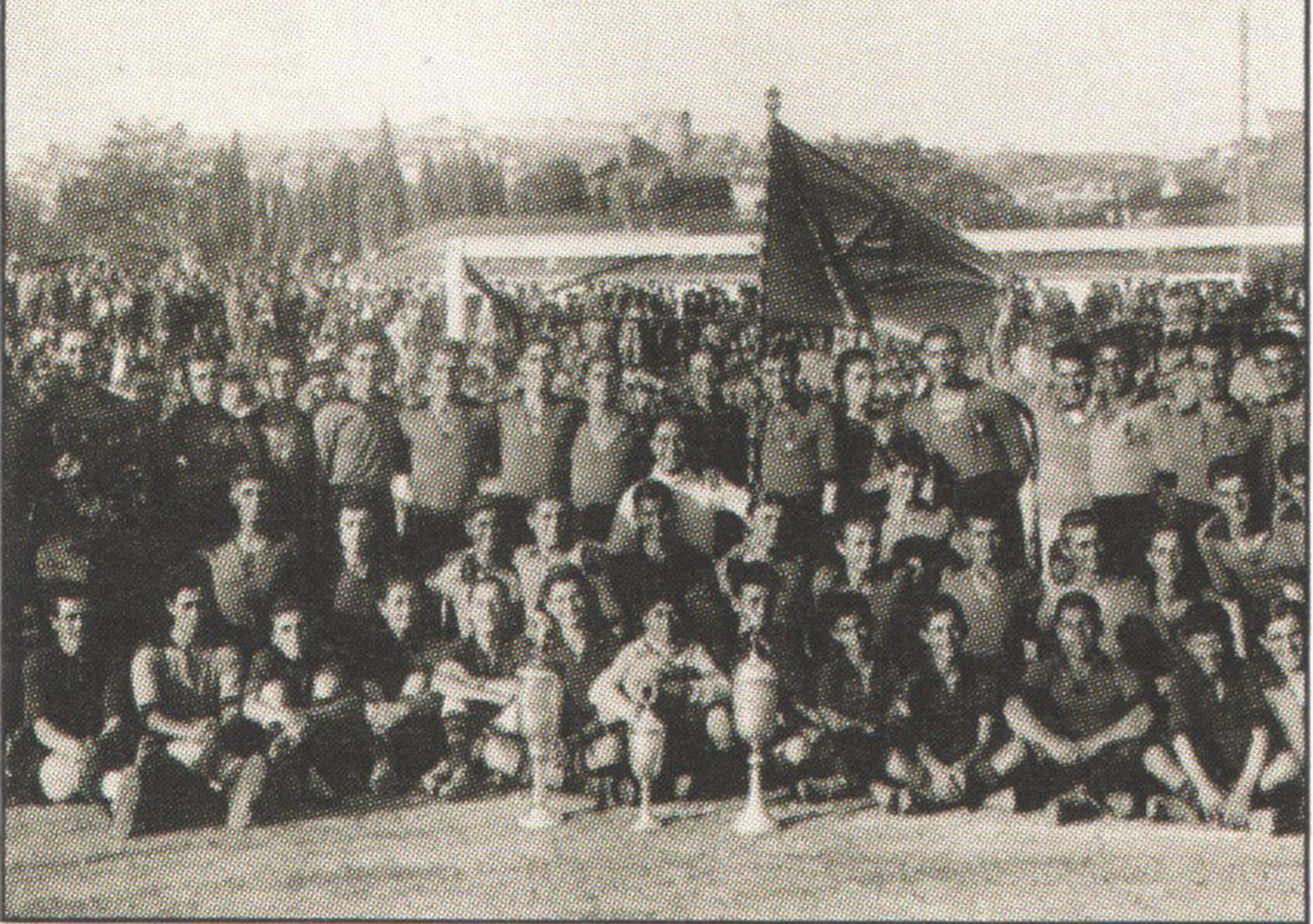
The team of 1930–31 season

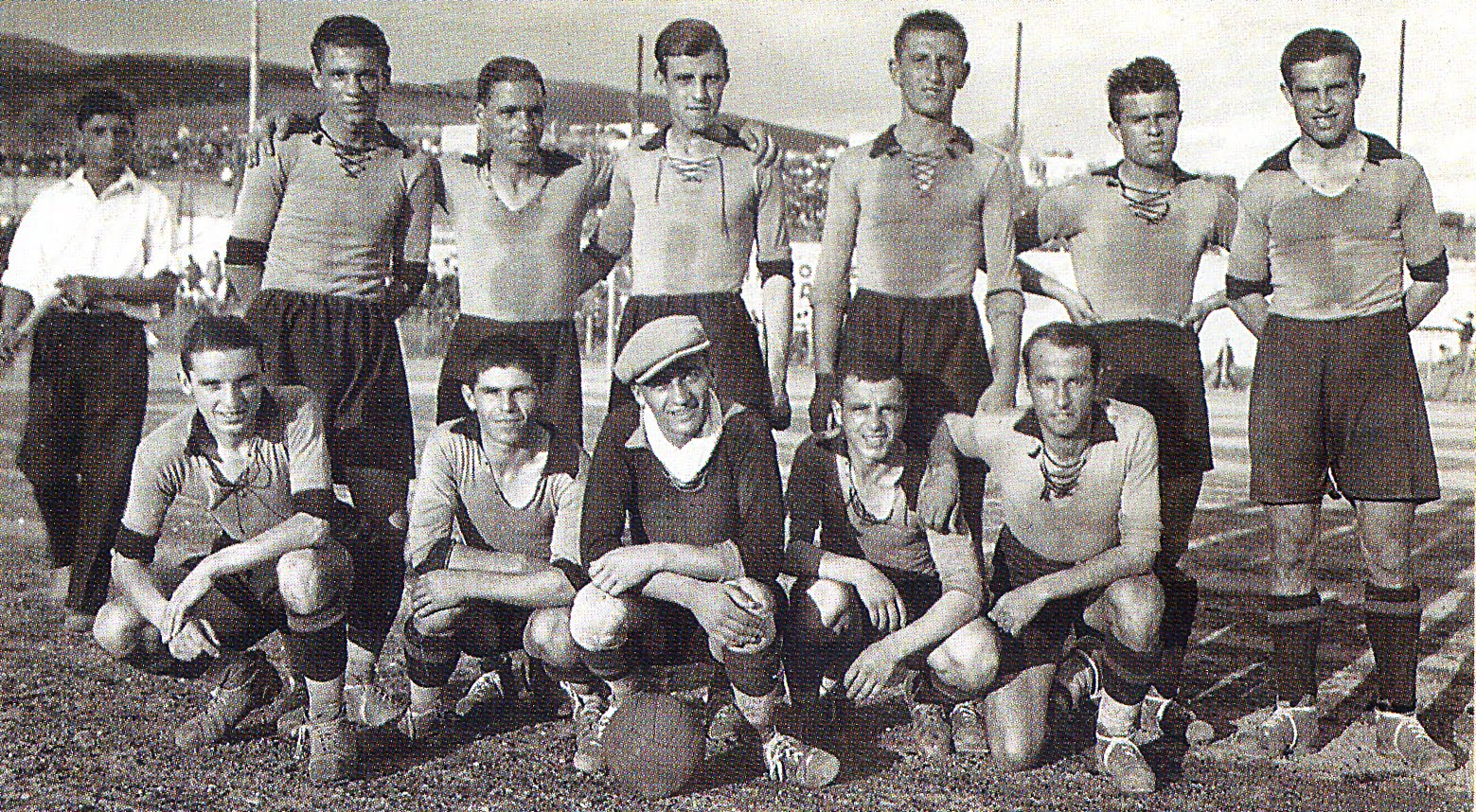
The champion team of 1932

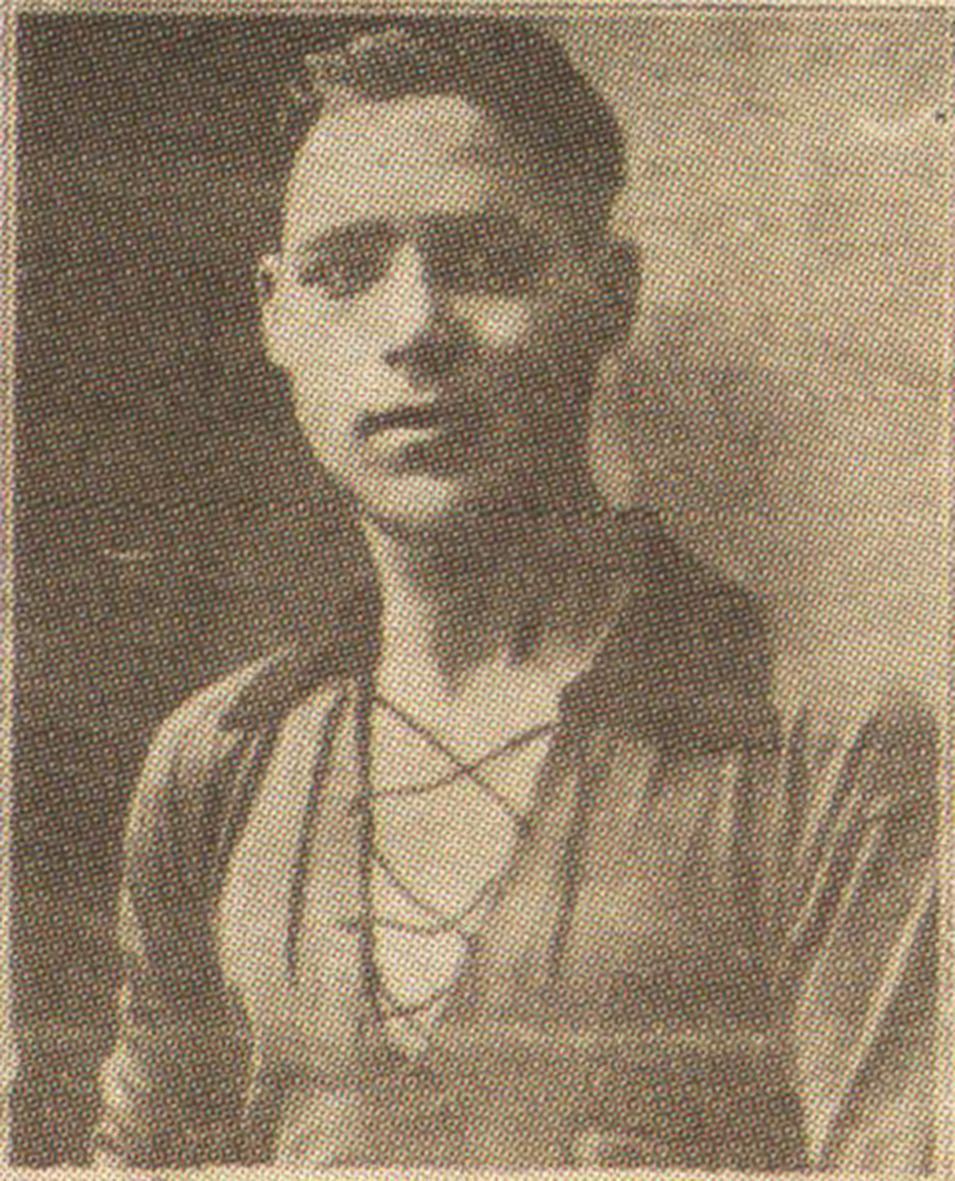
Nikolaos Aggelakis

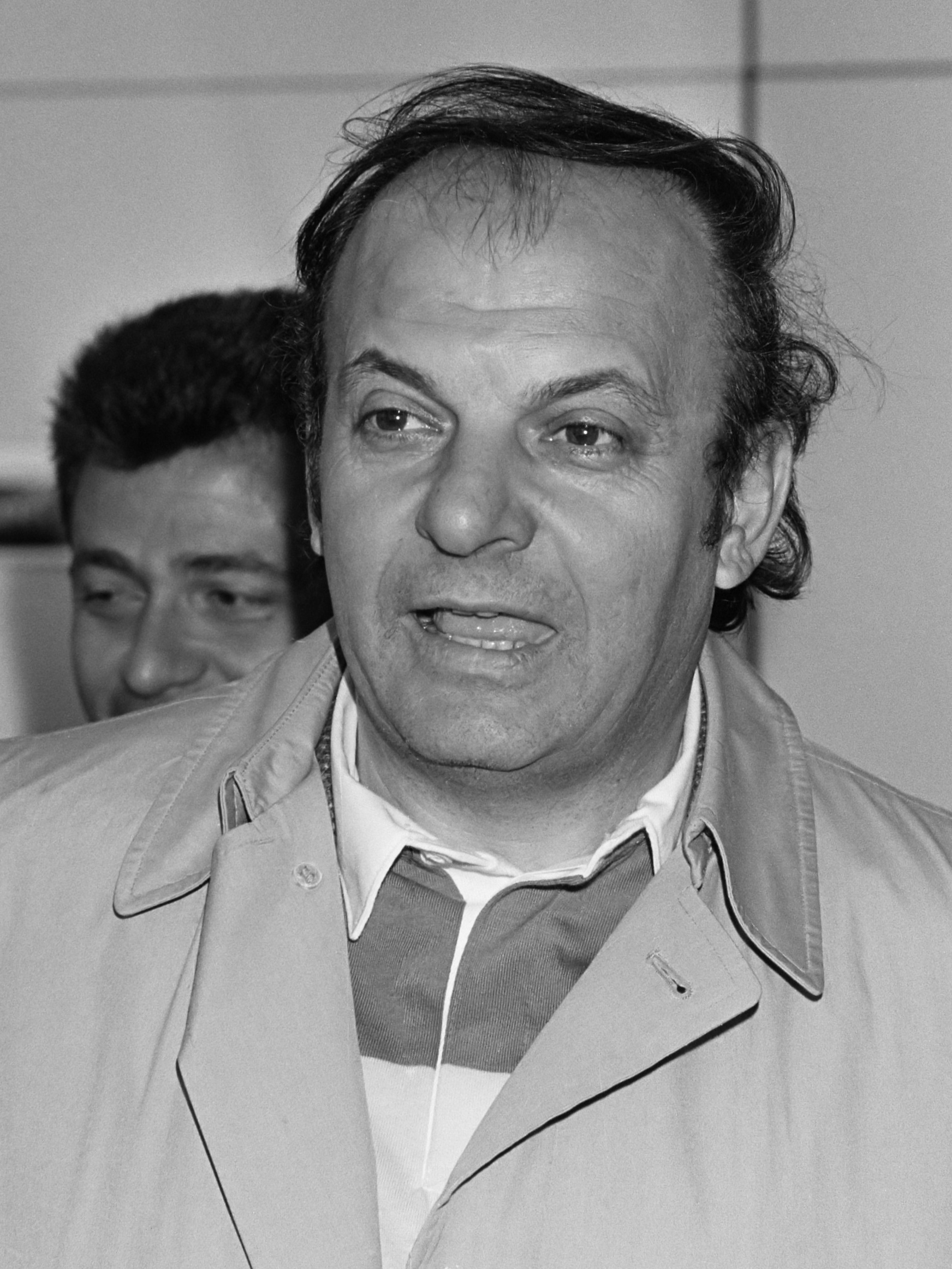
Alketas Panagoulias

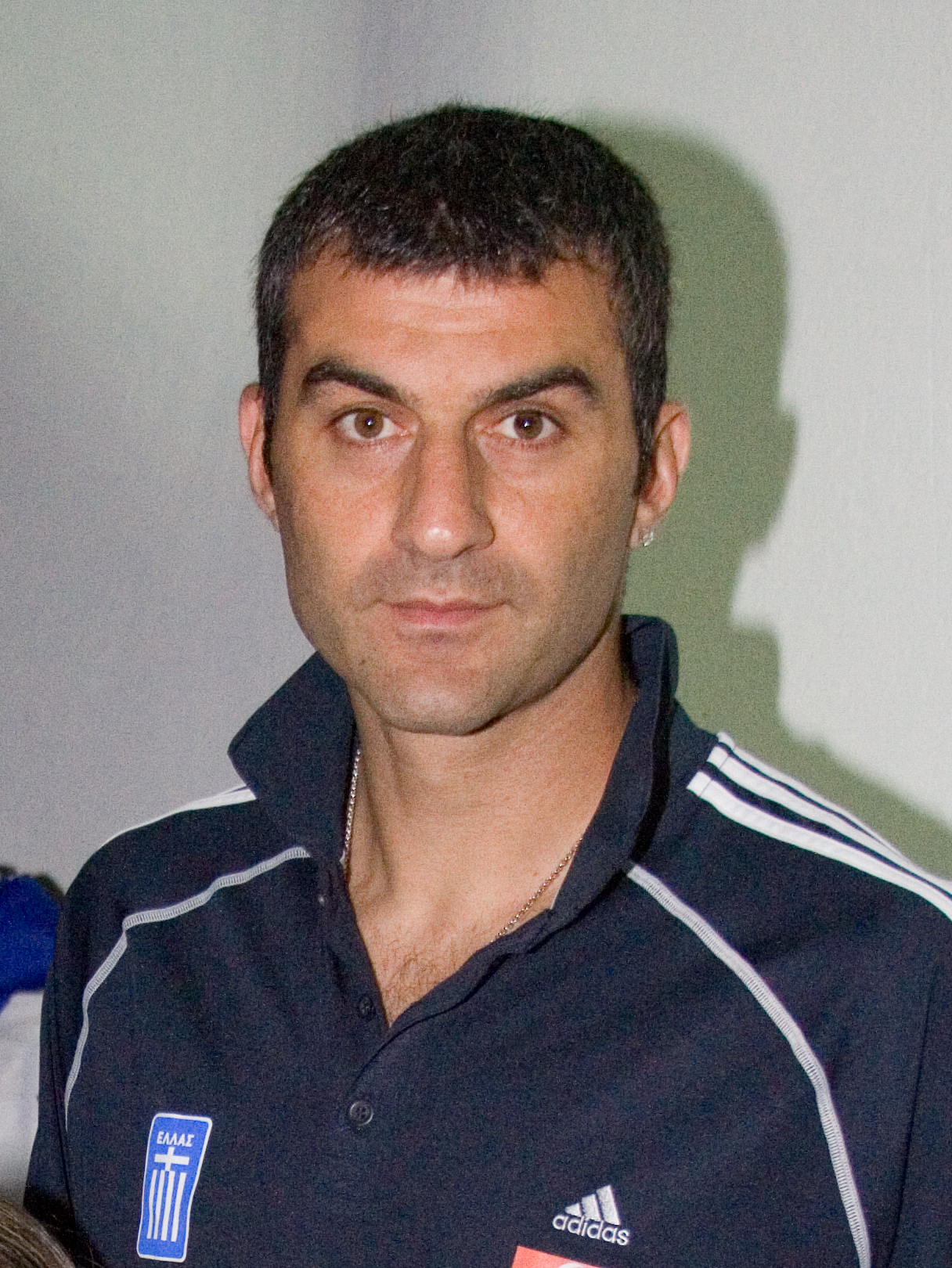
Traianos Dellas

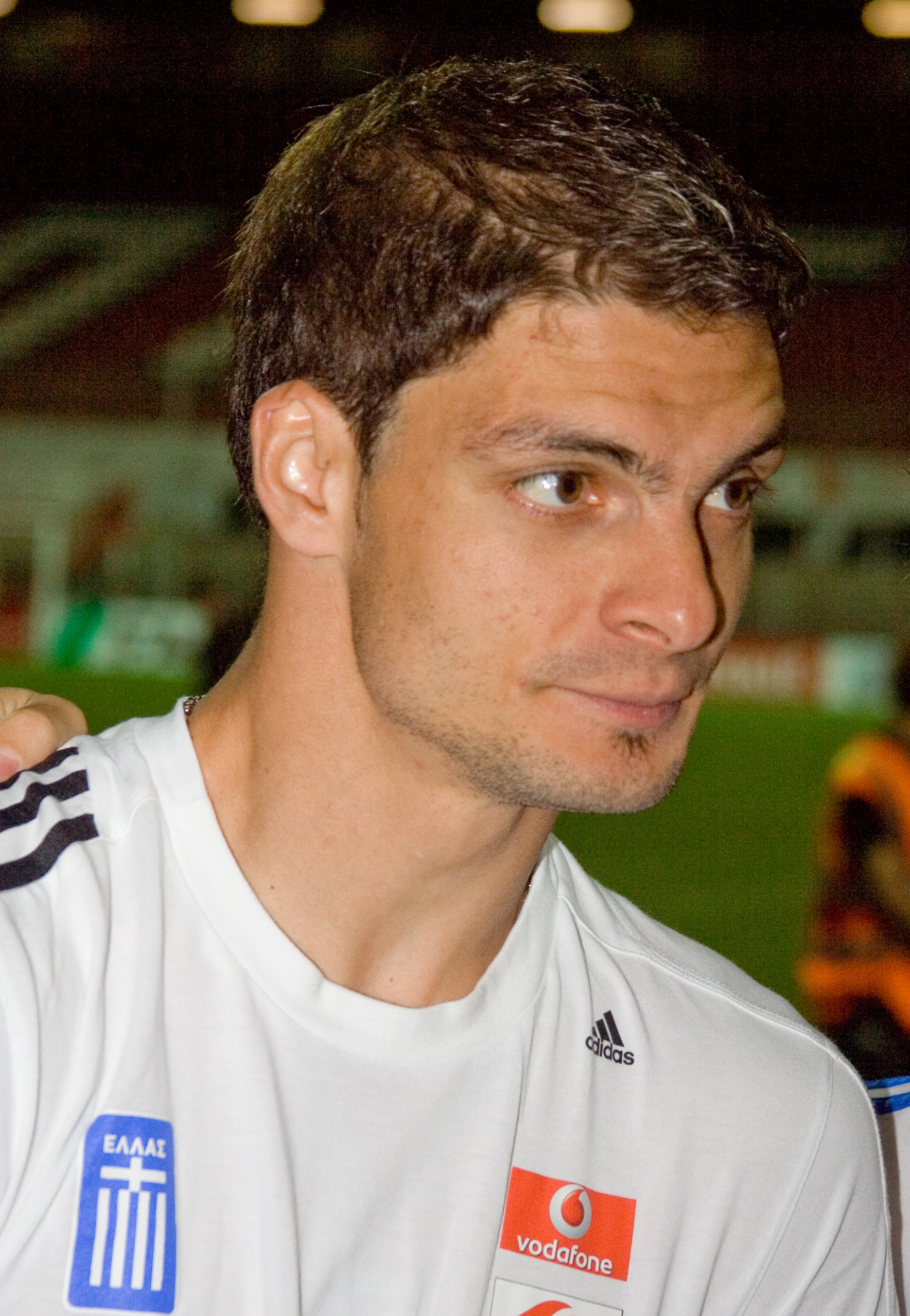
Angelos Charisteas

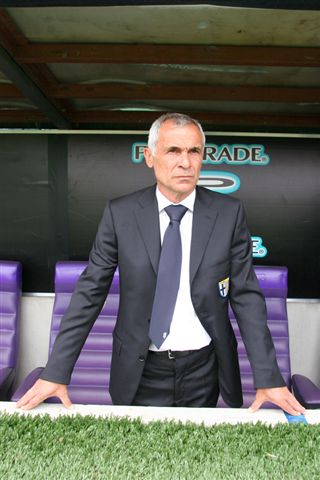
Héctor Cúper

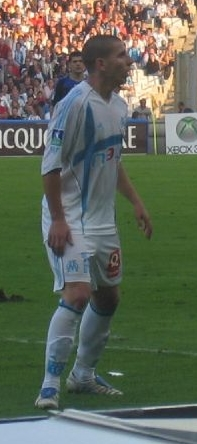
Sergio Koke
Basketball

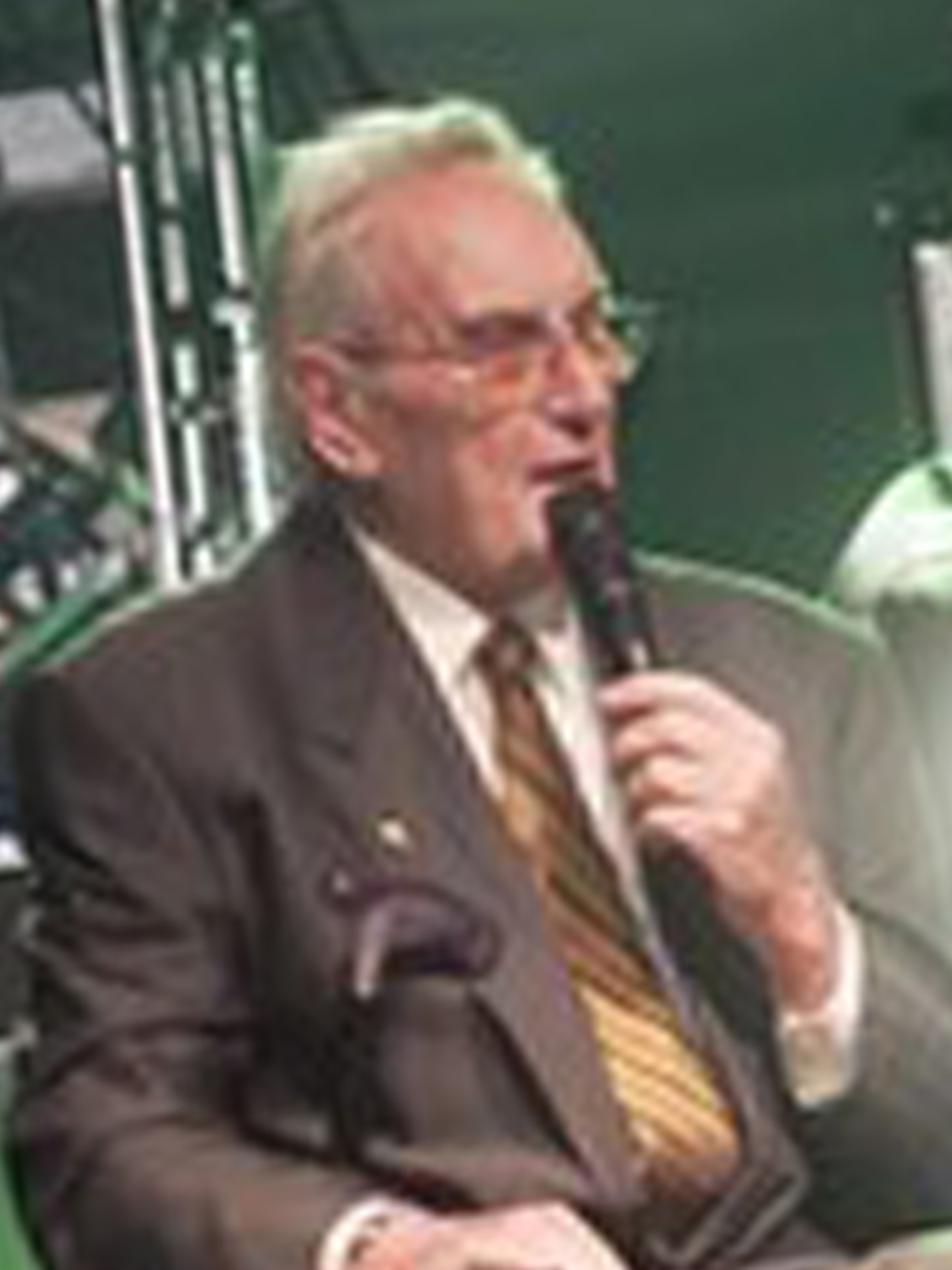
Faidon Matthaiou, the Patriarch of the Greek basketball

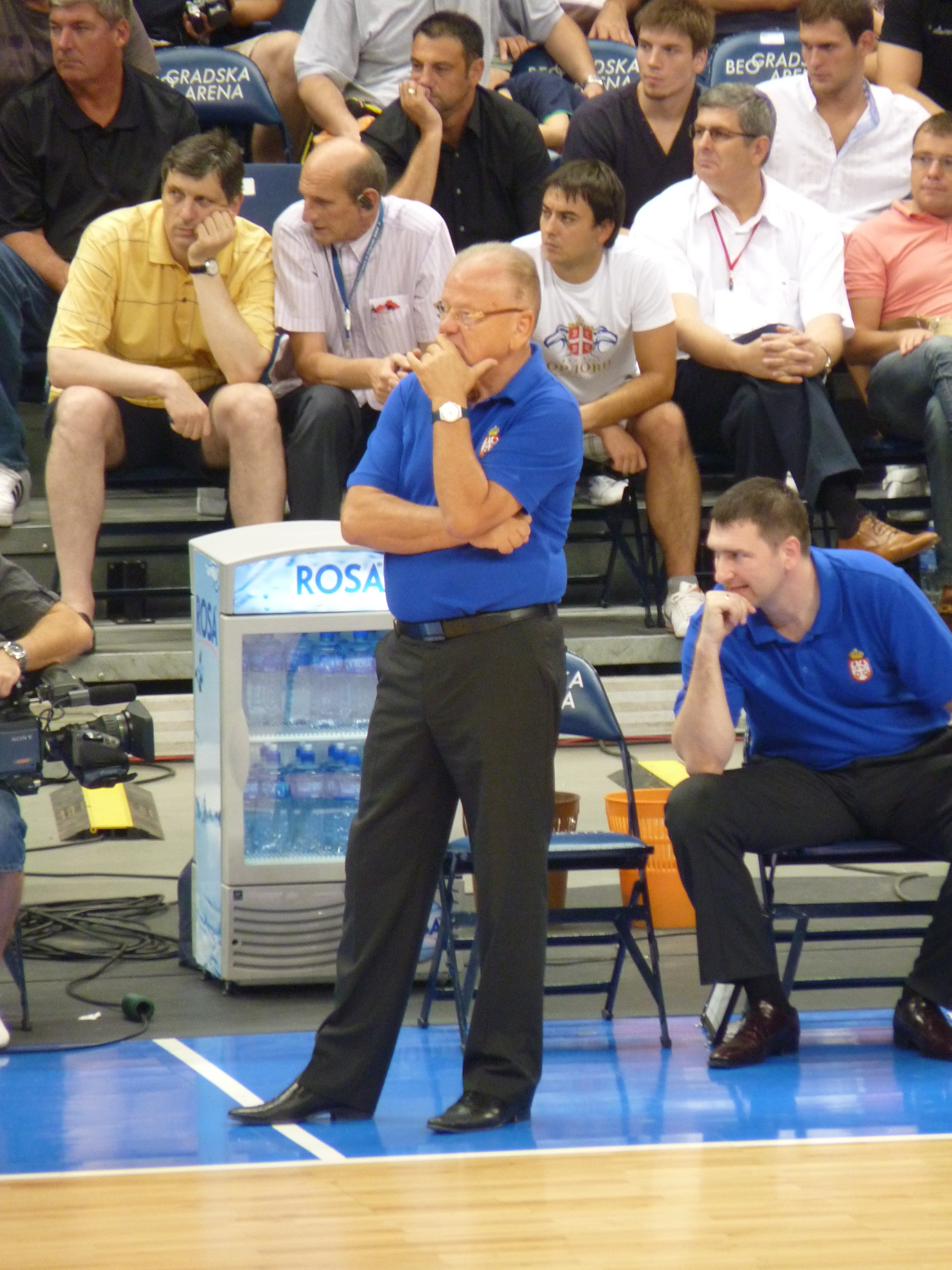
Dušan Ivković

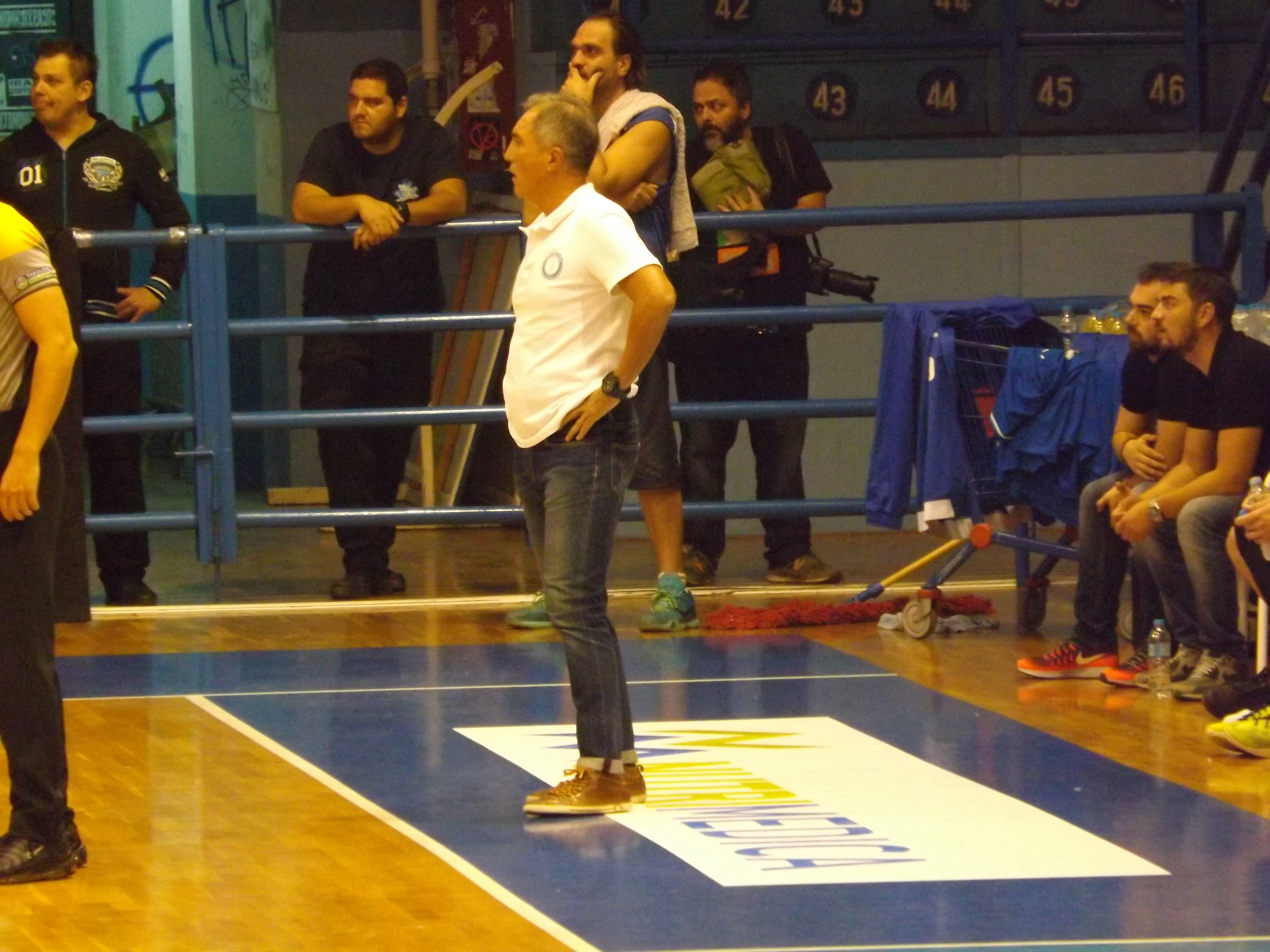
Vangelis Alexandris

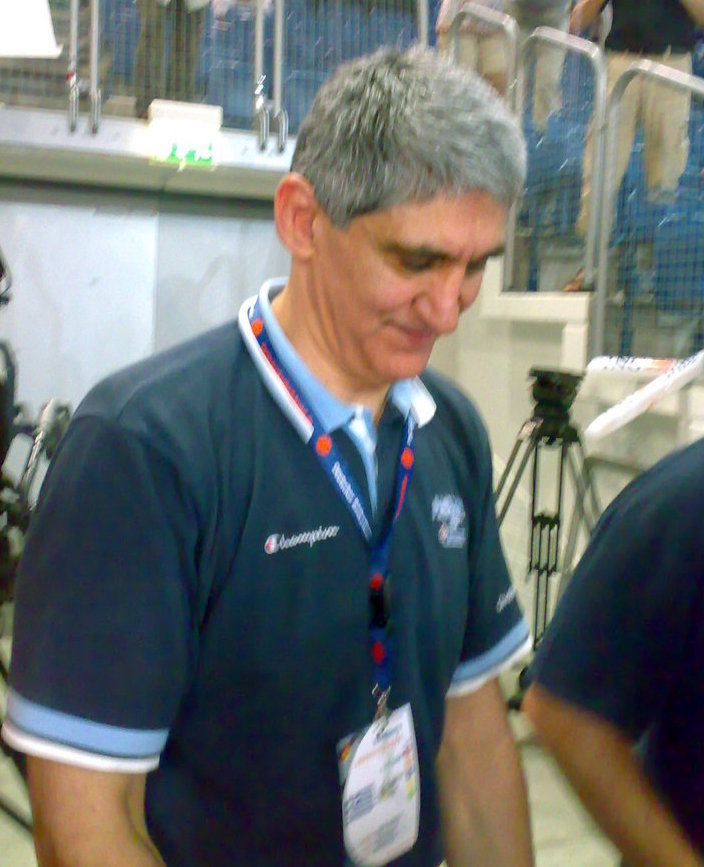
Panagiotis Giannakis

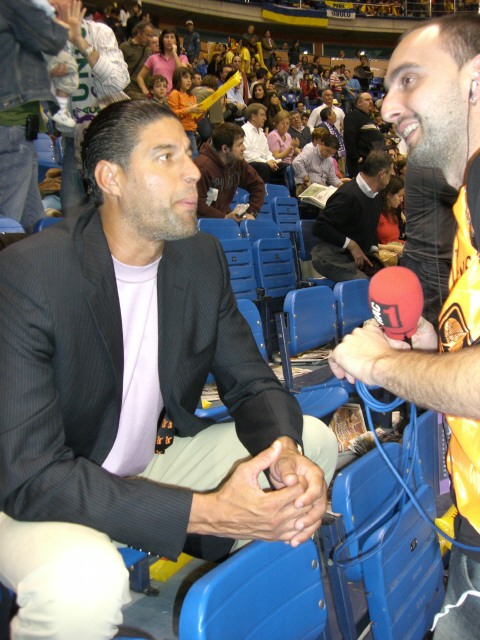
Jose Ortiz

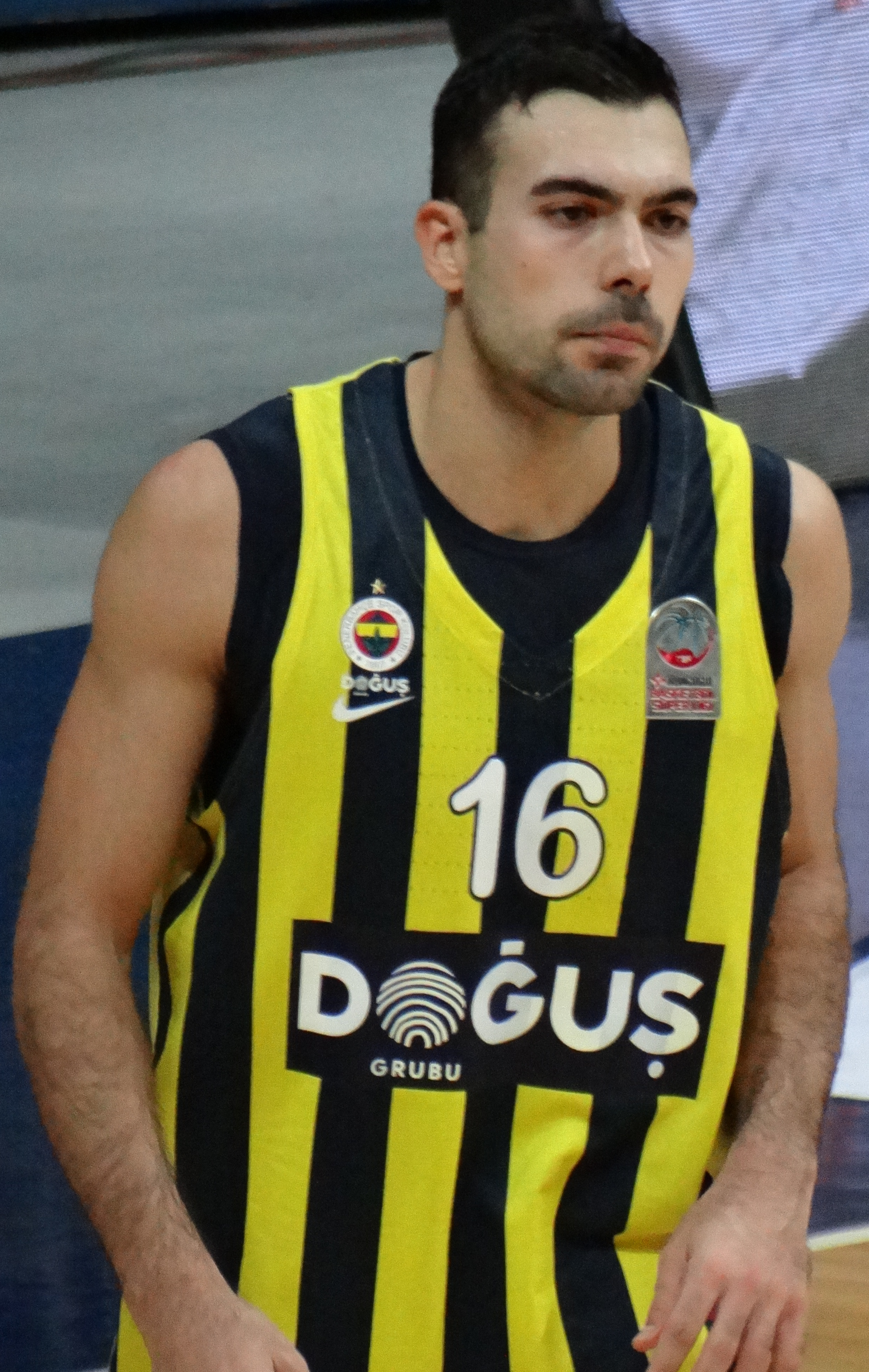
Kostas Sloukas

Kostas Papanikolaou

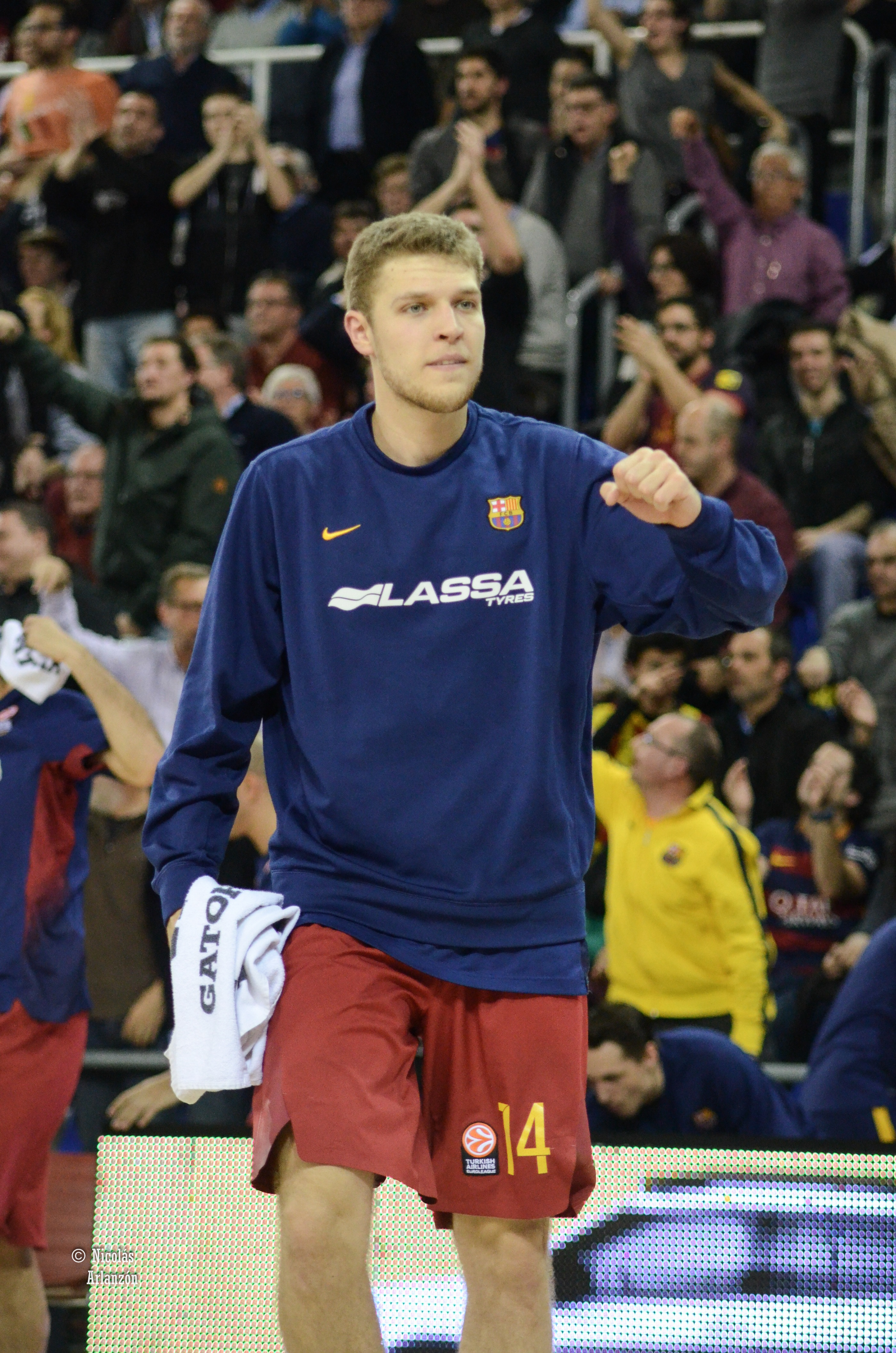
Aleksandar Vezenkov

== See also ==
- Aris Thessaloniki F.C.
- Aris B.C.
- Aris Volleyball Club
- Aris Baseball Club
- Aris Water Polo Club
