= 2010 Greek Ice Hockey Championship season =

The 2010 Greek Ice Hockey Championship season was the ninth season of the Greek Ice Hockey Championship. Nine teams participated in the league, and Iptamenoi Pagodromoi Athinai won their sixth league title.

== Regular season ==
| Pl. | | GP | W | T | L | GF–GA | Pts |
| 1. | Iptameni Pagodromoi Athen | 8 | 8 | 0 | 0 | 166:8 | 24 |
| 2. | Aris Thessaloniki | 9 | 7 | 1 | 1 | 112:32 | 20 |
| 3. | Avantes HC Chalkis | 7 | 6 | 0 | 1 | 63:32 | 19 |
| 4. | Albatros Athen | 9 | 4 | 1 | 4 | 41:63 | 12 |
| 5. | PAOK Thessaloniki | 8 | 3 | 0 | 5 | 35:30 | 9 |
| 6. | Madkows | 8 | 3 | 0 | 5 | 44:73 | 9 |
| 7. | Iraklis Thessaloniki | 8 | 3 | 0 | 5 | 30:92 | 9 |
| 8. | Athen Warriors | 8 | 1 | 0 | 7 | 15:130 | 3 |
| 9. | Tarandos Mozchatou | 7 | 0 | 0 | 7 | 0:40 | 0 |
