= 1989 Greek Ice Hockey Championship season =

The 1989 Greek Ice Hockey Championship season was the first season of the Greek Ice Hockey Championship. The Aris Saloniki Penguins won the inaugural title.
