= 1990 IIHF European Cup =

Tournament details
- Host countries: Bulgaria; Italy; Denmark; France; Germany; Switzerland
- City: Düsseldorf (final stage)
- Venues: 6 (in 6 host cities)
- Dates: 19 October – 30 December 1990
- Format: Knockout
- Teams: 20

Final positions
- Champions: (Sweden) Djurgårdens IF (1st title)
- Runners-up: (Soviet Union) Dynamo Moscow
- Third place: (Finland) TPS
- Fourth place: (Czech Republic) Sparta Praha

Tournament statistics
- Games played: 37
- Goals scored: 394 (10.65 per game)
- Scoring leader: (Czech Republic) Richard Žemlička (final stage)

The 1990 European Cup was the 26th edition of the European Cup, IIHF's premier European club ice hockey tournament. The season started on October 19, 1990, and finished on December 30, 1990.

The tournament was won by Djurgårdens IF, who beat Dynamo Moscow in the final.

== First group round ==
=== Group A ===
(Sofia, Bulgaria)

Team #1	Score	Team #2
Levski-Spartak Sofia (Bulgaria)	26:1	(Greece) AS Aris Thessaloniki
HC Steaua București (Romania)	30:0	(Greece) AS Aris Thessaloniki
Levski-Spartak Sofia (Bulgaria)	3:8	(Romania) HC Steaua București

=== Group A standings ===
Rank	Team	Points
1	(Romania) HC Steaua București	4
2	(Bulgaria) Levski-Spartak Sofia	2
3	(Greece) AS Aris Thessaloniki	0

=== Group B ===
(Bolzano, Italy)

Team #1	Score	Team #2
VEU Feldkirch (Austria)	6:5	(Hungary) Lehel HC Jászberény
HC Bolzano (Italy)	4:4	(Socialist Federal Republic of Yugoslavia) KHL Medveščak Zagreb
KHL Medveščak Zagreb (Socialist Federal Republic of Yugoslavia)	8:5	(Austria) VEU Feldkirch
HC Bolzano (Italy)	5:5	(Hungary) Lehel HC Jászberény
KHL Medveščak Zagreb (Socialist Federal Republic of Yugoslavia)	7:4	(Hungary) Lehel HC Jászberény
HC Bolzano (Italy)	7:4	(Austria) VEU Feldkirch

=== Group B standings ===
Rank	Team	Points
1	(Socialist Federal Republic of Yugoslavia) KHL Medveščak Zagreb	5
2	(Italy) HC Bolzano	4
3	(Austria) VEU Feldkirch	2
4	(Hungary) Lehel HC Jászberény	1

=== Group C ===
(Rødovre, Denmark)

Team #1	Score	Team #2
TMH Polonia Bytom (Poland)	3:0	(Norway) Furuset
Rødovre SIK (Denmark)	8:11	(United Kingdom) Cardiff Devils
Furuset (Norway)	9:4	(United Kingdom) Cardiff Devils
Rødovre SIK (Denmark)	1:7	(Poland) TMH Polonia Bytom
TMH Polonia Bytom (Poland)	8:3	(United Kingdom) Cardiff Devils
Rødovre SIK (Denmark)	7:2	(Norway) Furuset

=== Group C standings ===
Rank	Team	Points
1	(Poland) TMH Polonia Bytom	6
2	(Norway) Furuset	2
3	(Denmark) Rødovre SIK	2
4	(United Kingdom) Cardiff Devils	2

=== Group D ===
(Rouen, France)

Team #1	Score	Team #2
Rouen HC (France)	16:2	(Spain) CHH Txuri Urdin
Gunco Panda's Rotterdam (Netherlands)	21:1	(Spain) CHH Txuri Urdin
Rouen HC (France)	8:6	(Netherlands) Gunco Panda's Rotterdam

=== Group D standings ===
Rank	Team	Points
1	(France) Rouen HC	4
2	(Netherlands) Gunco Panda's Rotterdam	2
3	(Spain) CHH Txuri Urdin	0

(Switzerland) HC Lugano, (Czechoslovakia) Sparta Praha, (Finland) TPS, (Germany) Düsseldorfer EG : bye

== Second group round ==
=== Group A ===
(Düsseldorf, North Rhine-Westphalia, Germany)

Team #1	Score	Team #2
TPS (Finland)	4:1	(France) Rouen HC
Düsseldorfer EG (Germany)	7:4	(Socialist Federal Republic of Yugoslavia) KHL Medveščak Zagreb
Düsseldorfer EG (Germany)	3:4	(Finland) TPS
KHL Medveščak Zagreb (Socialist Federal Republic of Yugoslavia)	5:3	(France) Rouen HC
TPS (Finland)	3:1	(Socialist Federal Republic of Yugoslavia) KHL Medveščak Zagreb
Düsseldorfer EG (Germany)	11:3	(France) Rouen HC

=== Group A standings ===
Rank	Team	Points
1	(Finland) TPS	6
2	(Germany) Düsseldorfer EG	4
3	(Socialist Federal Republic of Yugoslavia) KHL Medveščak Zagreb	2
4	(France) Rouen HC	0

=== Group B ===
(Lugano, Ticino, Switzerland)

Team #1	Score	Team #2
HC Lugano (Switzerland)	7:2	(Poland) TMH Polonia Bytom
Sparta Praha (Czechoslovakia)	8:0	(Romania) HC Steaua București
HC Lugano (Switzerland)	5:1	(Romania) HC Steaua București
Sparta Praha (Czechoslovakia)	7:5	(Poland) TMH Polonia Bytom
HC Lugano (Switzerland)	4:4	(Czechoslovakia) Sparta Praha
TMH Polonia Bytom (Poland)	4:2	(Romania) HC Steaua București

=== Group B standings ===
Rank	Team	Points
1	(Czechoslovakia) Sparta Praha	5
2	(Switzerland) HC Lugano	5
3	(Poland) TMH Polonia Bytom	2
4	(Romania) HC Steaua București	0

== Final stage ==
(Düsseldorf, North Rhine-Westphalia, Germany)

=== Third round ===
Team #1	Score	Team #2
Düsseldorfer EG (Germany)	2:6	(Czechoslovakia) Sparta Praha
TPS (Finland)	5:4	(Switzerland) HC Lugano

=== Fifth place match ===
Team #1	Score	Team #2
Düsseldorfer EG (Germany)	6:2	(Switzerland) HC Lugano

(Sweden) Djurgårdens IF, (Soviet Union) Dynamo Moscow : bye

=== Semifinals ===
Team #1	Score	Team #2
Dynamo Moscow (Soviet Union)	3:2	(Finland) TPS
Djurgårdens IF (Sweden)	3:2	(Czechoslovakia) Sparta Praha

=== Third place match ===
Team #1	Score	Team #2
TPS (Finland)	4:3	(Czechoslovakia) Sparta Praha

=== Final ===
Team #1	Score	Team #2
Djurgårdens IF (Sweden)	3:2	(Soviet Union) Dynamo Moscow
