= Menelaos Chatzigeorgiou =

Greek politician (1924–2020)

Personal information
- Born: November 24, 1924 Thessaloniki, Greece
- Died: October 12, 2020 (aged 95)

Sport
- Sport: Basketball; Swimming; Water polo

Menelaos Chatzigeorgiou (Greek: Μενέλαος Χατζηγεωργίου; 24 November 1924 – 12 October 2020), surname alternatively transliterated Hatzigeorgiou or Hadjigeorgiou, was a Greek politician and athlete.

== Biography ==
A native of Thessaloniki, Chatzigeorgiou began his career as a basketball player with Aris B.C. in the 1930s and into the 1940s. After World War II, Chatzigeorgiou competed in swimming, water polo, and track and field for Aris Thessaloniki. He retired in the 1950s and became an administrator for the club, serving as president between 1972 and 1973. Chatzigeorgiou was elected a Member of the European Parliament from Greece in 1990, representing the New Democracy party.

He died on 12 October 2020, aged 95.
