= 2000 Greek Ice Hockey Championship season =

The 2000 Greek Ice Hockey Championship season was the sixth season of the Greek Ice Hockey Championship, first since 1993. Iptamenoi Pagodromoi Athinai won their third league title.
