= 2011 Greek Ice Hockey Championship season =

The 2011 Greek Ice Hockey Championship season was the tenth season of the Greek Ice Hockey Championship. The Aris Thessaloniki Ice Hockey Club won their fourth league title, first since 1991.
