= Dimitrios Lalas =

Greek composer and musician

Dimitrios Stergios Lalas
- Δημήτριος Στέργιος Λάλας
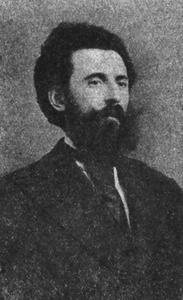
- Dimitrios Lalas in the late 19th or early 20th century.
- Born: 1844 or 1848; Magarevo, Ottoman Empire (now North Macedonia)
- Died: 1911; Monastir
- Education: University of Music and Performing Arts Munich
- Occupations: Composer, Musician, Conductor
- Notable work: "Makedonikos Paian"

Dimitrios Stergios Lalas or Lallas (Greek: Δημήτριος Στέργιος Λάλας ή Λάλλας) was a significant Greek composer and musician.

== Biography ==
Lalas was born in 1844 or 1848 in Magarevo, then Ottoman Empire (now North Macedonia). He studied in Monastir, Thessaloniki, Athens and later in 1868-70 in the University of Music and Performing Arts Munich. In 1870 he appears to have met the great German composer Richard Wagner and by 1876 he was his student and collaborator.

He soon became the conductor of an Orchestra in Salzburg, while in Presburg he replaced the conductor Hans Richter at a concert of Wagner's works in the presence of Wagner himself. During 1877-1881 he taught music in Chalki, and later settled in Thessaloniki. He was the teacher of Emilios Riadis.

He cooperated with fellow Greek Macedonians, with whom he co-founded "Macedonian Defense" at the end of 1902, committees of which appeared in Greek Macedonian towns and villages, preparing its inhabitants for the upcoming Macedonian Struggle. At some point, before 1906, Lalas composed a musical work on the Macedonian Struggle, entitled "Makedonikos Paian" (Μακεδονικός Παιάν).

He died of cholera in 1911 in Monastir, and his works were lost in 1917.
