= 1992 Greek Ice Hockey Championship season =

The 1992 Greek Ice Hockey Championship season was the fourth season of the Greek Ice Hockey Championship. Iptamenoi Pagodromoi Athinai won their first league title.
