= 2009 Greek Ice Hockey Championship season =

The 2009 Greek Ice Hockey Championship season was the eighth season of the Greek Ice Hockey Championship. Seven teams participated in the league, and Iptameni Pagodromoi Athen won their fifth league title.

== First round ==
Pl.		GP	W	T	L	GF–GA	Pts
1.	Iptameni Pagodromoi Athen	6	6	0	0	80:4	18
2.	PAOK Saloniki	6	5	1	0	64:15	15
3.	Avantes HC Chalkis	6	4	2	0	36:26	12
4.	Albatros Athen	6	3	3	0	43:29	9
5.	Lefka Gerakia	6	2	4	0	29:46	6
6.	Tarandos Mozchatou	6	1	5	0	15:51	3
7.	Ermis HC	6	0	6	0	2:98	0

== Final round ==
Pl.		GP	W	T	L	GF–GA	Pts
1.	Iptameni Pagodromoi Athen	3	3	0	0	18:1	9
2.	PAOK Saloniki	3	2	1	0	18:11	6
3.	Avantes HC Chalkis	3	1	2	0	10:15	3
4.	Albatros Athen	3	0	3	0	6:25	0
