= 2008 Greek Ice Hockey Championship season =

The 2008 Greek Ice Hockey Championship season was the seventh season of the Greek Ice Hockey Championship, the first since 2000. Iptamenoi Pagodromoi Athinai won their fourth league title.

== Regular season ==
Pl.		GP	W	T	L	GF–GA	Pts
1.	Iptameni Pagodromoi Athen	5	5	0	0	70:9	15
2.	PAOK Saloniki	5	4	1	0	45:18	12
3.	Albatros Athen	5	3	2	0	16:43	9
4.	Lefka Gerakia	5	2	3	0	28:63	6
5.	Avantes HC Chalkis	5	1	4	0	28:63	3
6.	Tarandos Mozchatou	5	0	5	0	13:55	0

== Playoffs ==
Semifinals:

- Iptameni Pagodromoi Athen - Lefka Gerakia 16:1, 15:0
- Albatros Athen - PAOK Saloniki 12:4, 4:8, 1:0

Final

- Iptameni Pagodromoi Athen - Albatros Athen 6:3, 9:5
