= Hymn of Aris Thessaloniki =

Song
- Released: 1926
- Songwriter: Georgios Kitsos

The Hymn of Aris or Aris Niketes (Ares Victorious) is the anthem of the Greek multi-sport club Aris, based in Thessaloniki. It was written in 1926. The lyrics were written by Georgios Kitsos and the music by Secondo Poselli (son of Vitaliano Poselli). The orchestration was made by the famous classic composer of Thessaloniki Emilios Riadis.

== Lyrics ==
Greek lyrics
Άρης! Άρης! Άρης!
Νικητής προχωρεί πάντα μπρος.
Άρης! Άρης! Άρης!
Και στο διάβα του σκύβει ο εχθρός.
Άρης! Άρης! Άρης!
Και στο διάβα του σκύβει ο εχθρός.
Άρης! Άρης! Άρης!
Νικητής προχωρεί πάντα μπρος.

Γίγα αετέ,
με την ψύχη σου γεμάτη υπερηφάνεια,
πάντα θα φορείς
του νικητού τα αμάραντα στεφάνια;
και τη δόξα σου
κανείς ποτέ δεν θα την πάρει.
Είσαι το παιδί
της νίκης, Μακεδόνα Άρη!

Λιονταρίσια έχεις καρδιά
και στη δυνατή ορμή σου,
σαν τον λαίλαπα με μιας
τον εχθρό σου τον σκορπάς.
Ποιός ποτέ του θα βρεθεί
να χτυπήσει το κορμί σου?
Δεν μπορεί κανείς
και θα νικάς όπου και αν πάς.

Άρης νικητής!
Άρης νικητής!

Πάντα νικητής
και με δάφνες θα γυρίζεις.
Δόξα και τιμή
στην πατρίδα σου χαρίζεις.
Άρη φοβερέ,
είσαι σίφουνας, λιοντάρι.
Είσαι γίγαντας
και δόξα να' χεις πάντα Άρη!

English translation
Αres! Ares! Ares!
Αlways victorious goes ahead.
Αres! Ares! Ares!
And in front of him the enemy leaves.
Αres! Ares! Ares!
And in front of him the enemy leaves.
Αres! Ares! Ares!
Always victorious goes ahead.

Great eagle,
with your soul full of proudness,
always you belong
the winner's amaranth wreaths;
and your glory
no one will take it from you.
You are the child
of the victory, Macedonian Ares!

You have a lion's heart
and in your strong momentum,
like a whirlwind
you disband your enemy.
Who will dare
to hit your body?
No one can
and you win wherever you go.

Ares victorious!
Ares victorious!

Always victorious
with laurels you stand.
Glory and honour
you grant to your country.
Αwesome Ares,
you are tornado, lion,
you are giant;
glory to you Ares!
