= 1991 Greek Ice Hockey Championship season =

The 1991 Greek Ice Hockey Championship season was the third season of the Greek Ice Hockey Championship. The Aris Saloniki Penguins were league champions for the third year in a row.
