= 1990 Greek Ice Hockey Championship season =

The 1990 Greek Ice Hockey Championship season was the second season of the Greek Ice Hockey Championship. The Aris Saloniki Penguins won the league title for the second consecutive season.
