= Stelios Papafloratos =

Greek footballer

Personal information
- Full name: Stylianos Papafloratos
- Date of birth: 27 January 1954 (age 72)
- Place of birth: Greece
- Height: 1.85 m (6 ft 1 in)
- Position: Goalkeeper

Senior career*
Years	Team	Apps	(Gls)
1970–1982	Aris		

International career
1975–1980	Greece	2	(0)
- * Club domestic league appearances and goals

Stelios Papafloratos (Greek: Στέλιος Παπαφλωράτος; born 27 January 1954) is a retired Greek football goalkeeper.

During his career he played for Aris from 1970 to 1982. He earned 2 caps for the Greece national football team, and participated in UEFA Euro 1980.
