= Emilios Riadis =

Greek composer

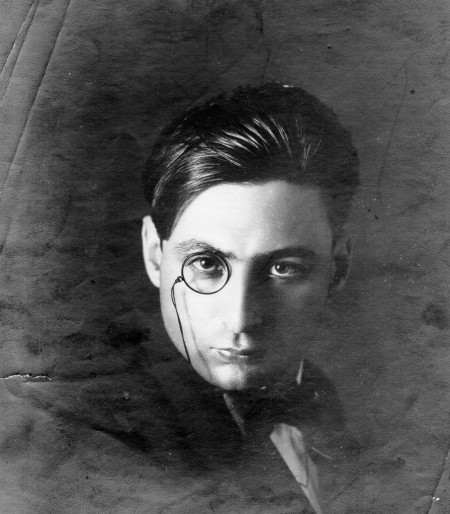

Emilios Riadis (original name Emilios Khu; Greek: Αιμίλιος Κου (Κούης) or Ριάδης; 13 May 1880 – 17 July 1935) was a Greek composer.

== Biography ==
Riadis was born in Thessaloniki, Ottoman Empire, now in Greece. He had his first music lesson in harmony and piano with a friend of Wagner's, Dimitrios Lalas. He also studied at the Munich Music Academy from 1908–1910. He studied form, instrumental and fugue with Walburnn, piano with Mayer-Schrey and choral singing with Becht and Stitch.

After finishing at the academy he moved to Paris and studied under Charpentier and Ravel (1910–1915). This was when he started appearing as the composer Riadis because he took the ending of his mother's maiden name, which was Elefteriadis. He was temporarily arrested at the beginning of World War I and resulted to his permanent move back to Thessaloniki. In 1915 he became a professor at the State Conservatory of Salonica. It is rumored that he was the sub-director, however there are no records indicating this.

Most of his works were for the stage, orchestra and chamber, but Riadis was famous for his songs. His songs were "distinguished by an expressive melodic line, somewhat oriental in its intervallic pattern; his harmonization’s are in the French manner". Most of his works, however, remained unfinished. He also gave a few lectures during the 1920s. In 1921/22 he lectured on Chinese music, in 1924 on Mozart and in 1926 on Ancient Egyptian music. Riadis won the National Award for Arts and Letters in 1923.

He also made the orchestration of the Hymn of Aris Thessaloniki, of which he was a supporter.

His song collection "Jasmins et Minarets" (published in 1913 by S. Chapelier, Paris, with lyrics by Riadis) serves as an excellent example of the use of exoticism tropes, carrying allegorical connotations closely related to the historic geopolitical shifts occurring at the time in his homeland, Macedonia. The three songs comprising the collection (Raïka, Odalisque, Salonique) likely reflect the national conflicts in the region during the First Balkan War. Raïka (a common Slavic name) synecdochically represents the Slavs and Bulgarians, with the poetic persona and musical texture conveying a sense of ambiguity and the unattainable. The menacing Odalisque represents the Ottoman Empire/Turkey. In the final song (Salonique), the composer-poet expresses both his nostalgia for his birthplace ("Salonique, je te vois toujours charmante, sous le regard si triste de l'Olympe") and his anxiety regarding its fate amidst the military conflicts of autumn 1912 and the ongoing diplomatic struggles for the validation of territorial gains in the spring of 1913.

== Notes ==
Theodoridou, Xenia (2013). "Emilios Riadis-Yannis A. Papaioannou: Greek Representatives of Orientalism", in Evi Nika-Samson et al. (eds.), Crossroads: Greece as an intercultural Pole of Musical Thought and Creativity. Conference Proceedings (Thessaloniki: Aristotle University, 2013),819-842
