= Hellenic Winter Sports Federation =

Ice hockey governing body in Greece

Greece
- Association name: Hellenic Winter Sports Federation
- IIHF Code: GRE
- IIHF membership: 29 April 1987 (37 years ago)
- President: George Nikitidis
- IIHF men's ranking: N/A

The Hellenic Winter Sports Federation (HWSF; Greek: Ελληνική Ομοσπονδία Χειμερινών Αθλημάτων, ΕΟΧΑ) replaced in 2014 the defunct Hellenic Ice Sports Federation (HISF; Greek: Ελληνική Ομοσπονδία Παγοδρομιών, ΕΟΠΑΓ) as the governing body of ice hockey in Greece.

== See also ==
- Greece national ice hockey team
- Greek Ice Hockey Championship
