= Greek Ice Hockey Championship =

Ice hockey competition in Greece

- Sport: Ice hockey
- Founded: 1989
- No. of teams: 11
- Country: Greece
- Most recent champion: Iptameni Athens (8th title)
- Most titles: Iptameni Athens (8 titles)
- Broadcaster: None

The Greek Ice hockey Championship (Greek: Πανελλήνιο Πρωτάθλημα Χόκεϊ επί Πάγου) is the only level of ice hockey in Greece. It is operated under the jurisdiction of the Hellenic Ice Sports Federation since 2015 an associate member of the International Ice Hockey Federation. From 1986 to 2014 it was under jurisdiction of the Hellenic Ice Skating Federation. There are currently 200 players registered.

== History ==
Hockey was played no later than from the beginning of the 20th century by Greeks in America, even the modern Greek words for ice hockey ("hockey epi pagou") and skates ("pagopedila") are from an older form of the language, as spoken in the first half of the 20th century.

Ice hockey started in Greece in 1984 by players that returned to Greece from abroad. Soon later five teams were formed, two in Athens, one in Piraeus, one in Salonica and one in Chalkida. The first official game was played in 1985 in Athens.

The first official Greek Championship was held in 1989 in the Peace and Friendship Stadium with five teams taking place. It was the first time hockey games were held in a normal size rink. The following year the Championship was held once again in the Peace and Friendship Stadium.

In 1991, the first junior national team was formed and took part in the World Junior Championship Pool C, held in Belgrade, Yugoslavia. In 1992, the junior national team once again took part in the World Junior Championship Pool C, this time held in Marino and Rome, Italy.

In 1992, the first-ever Greece national team was formed and took place in the Men's World Ice Hockey Championships in Pool C2 held in Johannesburg, South Africa. With only two weeks of serious training abroad and the support of the Greeks of South Africa, the national team won the bronze medal. It was extraordinary for a team to win a medal in their first appearance at the World Championships.

Despite the great achievement, the decline of the sport came in 1993. Economic help was discontinued by the Greek Undersecretary of State for Sports and all expenses to keep ice hockey alive were passed over to the players. Practices stopped and many players quit.

Practices started again in 1995 but were limited to once a week. Despite the hard times ice hockey faced, a national team was formed in 1995 and took part in the World Championships held once again in Johannesburg, South Africa (and also Krugersdorp, South Africa). Unfortunately, the problems affected the players and they were unable to defend the bronze medal they had won three years ago. They won one game and tied one in five games.

Although the problems continued to exist, in 1996, the Junior National Team took part in the European Championships. They made one win in five games. In March 1998, the men's national team went to the World Championships held in South Africa. They won one game and, despite all the problems, everyone was amazed at the level of Greek ice hockey.

By early 1999, nothing had changed concerning the funds from the Greek Undersecretary of State for Sports. Despite this, the men's national team took part in the World Championships Pool D held once again in South Africa. The team won one game.

In 2001, the Moschato Ice Rink closed down. Many players stopped playing and others started practicing in the only ice rink left in Greece. An ice rink far too small to be able to hold a serious ice hockey game.

In 2002, the effort was made to rebuild the league, but all efforts fell short.

The only ice rink left in Greece closed down definitely in May 2003.

After the closing of the last ice rink, the players of the national team decided to take trips to the Czech Republic for practices and games. Since that decision, 6 trips have been organized. Every 6 months, the players of the national team pay their own way and travel to the Czech Republic.

In 2007 Dimitrios Kalyvas convinced the IIHF that despite not having a rink, development of the sport is continuing in Greece. The efforts paid off, since the IIHF, after investigation decided to allow the National Team to compete again in international competition. This was great for Greek ice hockey since the national team competed again in 1999. The National Team played in the 2008 IIHF World Championship Division III Qualification and qualified to play in the 2008 IIHF World Championship Division III.

After their qualification a new ice rink opened again for the first time since 2003 and the Greek Championship was established once again.

The first Greek Ice Hockey Championship in the new era of Greek Ice Hockey was held in 2008 and the Greek Ice Hockey Champs were Iptamenoi Pagodromoi Athinai. They won again in 2009 and 2010.

== Teams ==
The Greek Ice Hockey Championship consists of 7 teams based in Athens and Serres.

=== Current teams ===
Active Teams:

- Albatros HC
- Avantes HC
- Iptamenoi Pagodromoi Athinai
- Mad Cows
- Tarandos Athens
- Warriors Athens
- Panserraikos HC

Folded Teams:

- Aris Thessaloniki
- Huskies Thessaloniki
- Ice Guardians Thessaloniki
- Iraklis Thessaloníki
- PAOK

== Format ==
In the last and best Greek Championship ever played in 2013, the teams were separated in 2 Groups. North and South. 5 Teams were in the North Group and 6 in the South Group. In the Regular Season, all teams in the same group play twice against each other and the top 2 qualify for the Final Four which is held in the Ano Liosia Olympic Hall located in Ano Liosia, Athens.

== Champions ==
Season	Champion
1989	Aris Thessaloniki
1990	Aris Thessaloniki
1991	Aris Thessaloniki
1992	Iptamenoi Pagodromoi Athinai
1993	Iptamenoi Pagodromoi Athinai
1994–1999	No Championship
2000	Iptamenoi Pagodromoi Athinai
2001–2007	No Championship
2008	Iptamenoi Pagodromoi Athinai
2009	Iptamenoi Pagodromoi Athinai
2010	Iptamenoi Pagodromoi Athinai
2011	Aris Thessaloniki *
2012	No Championship
2013	Iptamenoi Pagodromoi Athinai
2014–2016	No Championship
2017	Ice Guardians Thessaloniki**
2018	Iptamenoi Pagodromoi Athinai
2019–2023	No Championship

* The President of the Greek Federation did not allow Iptamenoi Pagodromoi Athinai participate in the Greek Championship despite the team being active.

** Iptamenoi Pagodromoi Athinai and Albatros Athens did not participate despite both teams being active.

== Greek titles by team ==
Titles	Team	Year
7	Iptamenoi Pagodromoi Athinai	1992, 1993, 2000, 2008, 2009, 2010, 2013, 2018
4	Aris Thessaloniki Ice Hockey Club	1989, 1990, 1991, 2011
1	Ice Guardians Thessaloniki	2017

== See also ==
- List of ice hockey leagues
