= Iptamenoi Pagodromoi Athinai =

Iptameni Pagodromi Athinai
- City: Athens, Greece
- League: Greek Ice Hockey Championship
- Founded: 1984
- Website: 'iptameni.gr
Home colours	Away colours

Medal record

Greek Ice Hockey Championship
Gold medal – first place	8 (1992, 1993, 2000, 2008, 2009, 2010, 2013, 2018)	
Silver medal – second place	3 (1989, 1990, 1991)	

Iptameni Pagodromi Athinai (Greek: Ιπτάμενοι Παγοδρόμοι Αθηνών or Ιπτάμενοι Αθηνών "Athens Iptameni HC") is a professional ice hockey team in Athens, Greece. They play in the Greek Ice Hockey Championship and are the leading team with the most Championship Cups.

== History ==
The club was founded in 1984, and joined the newly started Greek Championship in 1989. They finished as runner-up, losing to Aris Saloniki, in the 1989, 1990, and 1991 seasons. Their breakthrough was in 1992, when they won the Greek Championship for the first time. Iptameni won the championship again in 1993. After that Greek hockey fell on financial troubles, and the championship was not held again until 2000 where Iptameni won the Championship again.

After the 2000 season all ice rinks in Greece closed down and the championship was not held again until the 2007-08 season.

In the 2008 season, they finished first in the standings with a 5-0-0 record, and won the playoff championship in two games over Albatros Athens. Iptameni capped another perfect season in 2009, going 6-0-0 in the regular season, and 3-0-0 in the round-robin playoff winning the Championship once again.

In 2009-10, they went 8-0-0, and won the league title, as there were no playoffs held that season. The club did not participate during the 2010-11 season. In 2013, again they were victorious with a perfect 10-0-0, having 129 goals for versus only 13 goals against. In 2014 the jurisdiction of Ice Hockey moved to a new federation, the Hellenic Winter Sports Federation and they won the League title again in 2018.

== All-time points leaders ==
All-time points leaders
Name	Position	Goals	Assists	Points
Georgios Kalyvas (C)	F	70	62	140
Dimitrios Kalyvas	F	76	39	115
Orestis Tilios	D	52	43	95
Nikolaos Chatzigiannis (A)	D	37	28	65
Alexandros Valsamas-Rallis	F	38	23	61
Panagiotis Iatridis	D	24	30	54
Lazaros Efkarpidis (A)	F	41	13	54
Georgios Kouleles	F	27	21	48
Pavlos Kasampoulis	F	20	21	41
Kostas Lembesis	D	20	21	41
John Lachance	F	17	17	34
Iasonas Pachos	F	21	8	29
Diogenis Souras	D	18	9	27
Elias Kafouros	F	8	17	25
Themistoklis Lambridis	F	12	9	21
Marios Lybertos	D	11	9	20
Angelos Tzitzis	F	6	3	9
Ioannis Koufis	F	6	0	6

== Hellenic National Championship 2018 ==
GREEK CHAMPIONS: IPTAMENI ATHENS

| Games played: 9 | Wins: 9 | Losses: 0 | Goals for: 110 | Goals against: 14 |

Date	Time	Game	Score
15-03-2019	10:00pm	IPTAMENI-Tarandos	5-0* (forfeit)
16-03-2019	8:00am	IPTAMENI-Warriors	10-2
17-03-2019	8:00am	IPTAMENI-Avantes	16-1
06-04-2019	10:00pm	IPTAMENI-Avantes	10-3
07-04-2019	9:00am	IPTAMENI-Warriors	12-0

Date	Time	Game	Score
08-12-2018	8:00am	IPTAMENI-Warriors	17-0
08-12-2018	4:00pm	IPTAMENI-Ice Guardians	6-5 (0-0 OT, 1-0 SO)
09-12-2018	8:00am	IPTAMENI-Avantes	18-0
09-12-2018	3:00pm	IPTAMENI-Panseraikos	16-3

== Hellenic National Championship 2013 ==
GREEK CHAMPIONS: IPTAMENI ATHENS

| Games played: 10 | Wins: 10 | Losses: 0 | Ties: 0 | Goals for: 129 | Goals against: 13 |

Date	Time	Game	Score
30-01-2013	11:00pm	IPTAMENI-ALBATROS	8-0
06-02-2013	11:00pm	IPTAMENI-WARRIORS	23-0
14-02-2013	11:00pm	IPTAMENI-TARANDOS	18-4
21-02-2013	11:00pm	IPTAMENI-MADCOWS	8-3
28-02-2013	11:00pm	IPTAMENI-AVANTES	13-2
06-03-2013	11:00pm	IPTAMENI-ALBATROS	4-1
13-03-2013	11:00pm	IPTAMENI-WARRIORS	25-0
18-03-2013	11:00pm	IPTAMENI-TARANDOS	17-1
25-03-2013	11:00pm	IPTAMENI-MADCOWS	8-2
01-04-2013	11:00pm	IPTAMENI-AVANTES	5-0 (forfeit)

== Hellenic National Championship 2010 ==
GREEK CHAMPIONS: IPTAMENI ATHENS

| Games played: 9 | Wins: 9 | Losses: 0 | Ties: 0 | Goals for: 112 | Goals against: 4 |

Date	Game	Score
23.04.2010	IPTAMENI AVANTES	15 - 1
24.04.2010	IPTAMENI - IRAKLIS	28 - 1
26.04.2010	IPTAMENI - TARANDOS	5 - 0 (forfeit)
29.04.2010	IPTAMENI - ALBATROS	25 - 1
01.05.2010	IPTAMENI - ARIS	14 - 2
03.05.2010	IPTAMENI - WARRIORS	39 - 0
05.05.2010	IPTAMENI -MADKOWS	35 - 3
07.05.2010	IPTAMENI -MADKOWS	12 - 3
16.05.2010	IPTAMENI - PAOK	5 - 0 (forfeit)

== Hellenic National Championship 2009 ==
GREEK CHAMPIONS: IPTAMENI ATHENS

| Games played: 9 | Wins: 9 | Losses: 0 | Ties: 0 | Goals: 98 | Goals Against: 4 |

Date	Game	Score
19.05.2009	IPTAMENI - ALBATROS	11 - 0
22.05.2009	IPTAMENI - WARRIORS	18 - 0
25.05.2009	IPTAMENI - MADKOWS	18 - 0
28.05.2009	IPTAMENI - TARANDOS	18 - 0
29.05.2009	IPTAMENI - AVANTES	11 - 2
31.05.2009	IPTAMENI - PAOK	4 - 1
04.06.2009	IPTAMENI - ALBATROS	9 - 0
05.06.2009	IPTAMENI - AVANTES	5 - 0 (forfeit)
06.06.2009	IPTAMENI - PAOK	4 - 1

== Hellenic National Championship 2008 ==
GREEK CHAMPIONS: IPTAMENI ATHENS

| Games played: 9 | Wins: 9 | Losses: 0 | Ties: 0 | Goals For: 115 | Goals Against: 17 |

Date	Game	Score
21.04.2008	IPTAMENI - AVANTES	15-2
30.04.2008	IPTAMENI - MADKOWS	14-0
04.05.2008	IPTAMENI - PAOK	12-1
05.05.2008	IPTAMENI - TARANDOS	18-1
08.05.2008	IPTAMENI - ALBATROS	10-4
10.05.2008	IPTAMENI - MADKOWS	16-1
11.05.2008	IPTAMENI - MADKOWS	15-0
12.05.2008	IPTAMENI - ALBATROS	6-3
13.05.2008	IPTAMENI - ALBATROS	9-5

== Season-by-season record ==
- 2018 - 1st
- 2013 - 1st
- 2012 - no championship
- 2011 - did not participate due to the fact that the Federation President did not allow them.
- 2010 - 1st
- 2009 - 1st
- 2008 - 1st
- 2001–2007 - no championship
- 2000 - 1st
- 1994–1999 - no championship
- 1993 - 1st
- 1992 - 1st
- 1991 - 2nd
- 1990 - 2nd
- 1989 - 2nd
