= 1959–60 AEK Athens F.C. season =

AEK Athens
1959–60 season
- Chairman: Nikos Goumas
- Manager: Lukas Aurednik
- Stadium: AEK Stadium
- Alpha Ethniki: 2nd
- Greek Cup: Round of 32
- Top goalscorer: League: Kostas Nestoridis (32); All: Kostas Nestoridis (42)
- Highest home attendance: 20,000 vs Olympiacos (10 January 1960)
- Lowest home attendance: 2,000 vs Victoria (14 October 1959)
- Average home league attendance: 11,426
- Biggest win: AEK Athens 7–0 PAO Kalogreza
- Biggest defeat: Doxa Drama 2–0 AEK Athens; Olympiacos Chalkida 2–0 AEK Athens
Home colours	Away colours

The 1959–60 season was the 36th season in the existence of AEK Athens F.C. and the first season in the top flight of Greek football. They competed in the Alpha Ethniki and the Greek Cup. The season began on 23 September 1959 and finished on 31 July 1960.

== Kits ==
Home	Away

== Overview ==
From the previous season, the discussions for the establishment of a single championship of a national division were in motion. The HFF was divided and hesitated to take a decision, as the reactions of the local associations were varied. However, two factors played an important role in the final decision of the Greek football officials. On one hand, there was the ever-intensifying pressure for the establishment of a national division championship by UEFA, in order for the representation of the Greek clubs in the European Cups would become more meritorious. On the other hand, there was also the government's will to institutionalize the PRO-PO. That led the HFF in the eventual decision of the establishment of the first and second national divisions as replacements of the regional championships.

In the summer of 1959, AEK were strengthened with the striker, Stefanos Demiris, the goalkeeper, Kimon Dimitriou and the central defenders, Dimitris Diakakis and Giannis Marditsis, while the transfer of Alekos Sofianidis, who was acquired during the previous season, was finally completed. Even though the signings were not buzzing, it seemed that the team was complete and ready to claim the championship. AEK who were the only contender against the omnipotence of Olympiacos during the 1950s, entered the new championship focused exclusively on winning the title. After all, they were one step away from the previous season's title, when in the final matchday at Karaiskakis Stadium they were ahead by 0–2, but were tied and the title eventually ended up to the red and whites.

Ιn the Cup that started at the beginning season, AEK with characteristic ease eliminated at home Proodos Patisia with 5–0 in the first round and Victoria with 7–1 in the second round. Afterwards, they eliminated both Ilisiakos and Dafni Athens with 3–1 at home, for the third and fourth round, respectively. At the fifth round they scattered PAO Kalogreza with a 7–0 win at home and were qualified to the sixth round, where they faced Atromitos and eliminated them with 1–0 home win. At the round of 32, they were drawn against Olympiacos Chalkida, this time away from home and were eliminated with a 2–0 defeat.

The first championship of the first national division started on 25 October and Giannis Kanakis emerged as the scorer of its first ever goal, when at the 3rd minute of the match against Ethnikos Piraeus at Karaiskakis Stadium he made the 0–1 for AEK that remained as the final score. However, the "dark clouds" did not take long to make their appearance, showing in the most emphatic way that the change of conduct did not automatically mean the termination of the issues of previous years. At the 11th matchday, AEK played at Thessaloniki against Aris and the score was 2–1. At the 84th minute the referee, vacillating between giving a penalty or an indirect free kick to a foul on a player of AEK inside the area of Aris, caused a clash between the footballers of both clubs. Thus, he stopped the match, which was repeated ten days later with another referee and ended 2–2. Furthermore, the serious injury of Kostas Nestoridis at the home match against Proodeftiki kept him off the pitch for about a month and during that period AEK achieved 3 draws in equal number of matches, that would cost them in the end of the season. From about the middle of the season onwards AEK had to carry on without their long serving captain, Giannis Kanakis, who retired as a footballer.

Despite everyone seemingly being against them, the yellow-blacks were kept alive in the title race and at the top of the table. On 18 June, they competed at Karaiskakis Stadium against Proodeftiki. The pitch turned into a fighting arena and after a lot of banter between the players and several expulsions, the match ended in a 2–2 draw. Strangely enough, even though the referee did not record the suspensions of Stelios Serafidis and Giorgos Petridis on the match sheet, the two players were eventually punished based on the report of the observer and their monthly ban became effective after the final matchday. Furthermore, with the title race reaching its end, several clubs such as Panionios and Apollon Athens, claiming larger financial incomes, accepted the conduction of their home games against Panathinaikos at the larger home ground of the latter, Leoforos Alexandras Stadium. Even under these conditions, AEK remained at the top of the standings with a 2-point difference from the second Panathinaikos. In the final matchday AEK played at the Nea Smyrni Stadium against Panionios. It was rumored that the friendly relations between Nestoridis and his former teammates at Panionios would end up in an easy win for AEK. The rebuttal came in quickly, as Panionios won by 3–2, proving that for the duty of their players prevailed over friendship. It did not prove to be the same at Karaiskakis Stadium, where at the same time Olympiacos underperformed in the second half and were defeated by 1–4 from Panathinaikos, giving them the points needed to tie with AEK in order for the championship play-off to be set.

The play-off match that took place on 31 July found the yellow-blacks decimated by suspensions from the match against Proodeftiki. Thus they played with Sotiris Fakis under the goalposts for the first time. Disappointed by the turn of the championship race, AEK were defeated by 2–1 despite taking the lead at the 14th minute with Christos Ampos. Thus, the first title of the Alpha Ethniki was "dressed in green".

The end of the season found AEK in second place in the championship having the best attack with 77 goals and Kostas Nestoridis as the top scorer with 33 goals in 27 matches, who in several games seemed to take them by the hand and lead them to their first post-war title.

== Management team ==
Position	Staff
Manager	(Austria) Lukas Aurednik
Assistant manager	(Greece) Christos Ribas

== Players ==
=== Squad information ===
NOTE: The players are the ones that have been announced by the AEK Athens' press release. No edits should be made unless a player arrival or exit is announced. Updated 31 July 1960, 23:59 UTC+2.

Player	Nat.	Position(s)	Date of birth (Age)	Signed	Previous club	Transfer fee
Goalkeepers
Sotiris Fakis	(Greece)	GK	1934 (aged 25–26)	1957	(Greece) Amyna Ampelokipoi	Free
Stelios Serafidis	(Greece)	GK	6 August 1935 (aged 24)	1953	(Greece) AEK Athens U20	—
Kimon Dimitriou	(Greece)	GK	1938 (aged 21–22)	1959	(Greece) Propontis Chalkida	Free
Defenders
Thanasis Tsangaris	(Greece)	RB / LB	1929 (aged 30–31)	1953	(Greece) Apollon Athens	Free
Giannis Marditsis	(Greece)	CB / ST	19 February 1933 (aged 27)	1959	(Greece) Egaleo	₯103,000
Petros Stamatelopoulos	(Greece)	LB	19 March 1934 (aged 26)	1959	(Greece) Panerythraikos	₯100,000
Nikos Melissis	(Greece)	CB / DM / ST	1936 (aged 23–24)	1953	(Greece) PAO Kalogreza	Free
Mimis Anastasiadis	(Greece)	RB / CB / ST	26 October 1936 (aged 23)	1956	(Greece) A.O. Nea Ionia	Free
Antonis Gavanas	(Greece)	CB	1938 (aged 21–22)	1957	(Greece) Ethnikos Asteras	Free
Theofilos Vernezis	(Greece)	RB / CB / GK	1938 (aged 21–22)	1956	(Greece) AEK Athens U20	—
Dimitris Diakakis	(Greece)	CB	1942 (aged 17–18)	1959	Free agent	Free
Midfielders
Pavlos Emmanouilidis	(Greece)	RM / RW / ST / SS	15 October 1929 (aged 30)	1947	(Greece) AEK Athens U20	—
Thymios Polyzos	(Greece)	CM	1931 (aged 28–29)	1956	(Greece) Asteras Athens	Free
Miltos Papapostolou	(Greece)	DM / CB	9 September 1935 (aged 24)	1956	(Greece) Egaleo	Free
Giorgos Petridis	(Greece)	AM / SS / ST / LW	10 February 1938 (aged 22)	1957	(Greece) Pera Club	Free
Kostas Zografos	(Greece)	CM	1941 (aged 18–19)	1955	Free agent	—
Samaras	(Greece)	AM	1941 (aged 18–19)	1958	Free agent	Free
Forwards
Kostas Nestoridis	(Greece)	ST / SS / LW / RW	15 March 1930 (aged 30)	1955	(Greece) Panionios	Free
Alekos Sofianidis	(Greece) (Turkey)	LW / LM / LB	3 August 1935 (aged 24)	1959	(Turkey) Beşiktaş	Free
Andreas Stamatiadis (Vice-captain)	(Greece)	RW / LW / SS / AM	16 August 1935 (aged 24)	1952	(Greece) AEK Athens U20	—
Dimitris Tsanoulas	(Greece)	ST	1936 (aged 23–24)	1956	Free agent	Free
Christos Ampos	(Greece)	LW / SS / ST	19 October 1937 (aged 22)	1955	(Greece) A.O. Kifisia	Free
Argyris Argyropoulos	(Greece)	ST	1939 (aged 20–21)	1958	(Greece) AEK Athens U20	—
Loukas Sismanis	(Greece)	ST	1939 (aged 20–21)	1958	(Greece) Athinaikos	Free
Stefanos Demiris	(Greece)	ST / SS / AM	19 January 1941 (aged 19)	1959	(Greece) AE Kavala	—
Left during season
Giannis Kanakis (Captain)	(Greece)	RM / LM / RB / LB	27 August 1927 (aged 32)	1949	(Greece) AE Kavala	Free

== Transfers ==
=== In ===
Pos.	Player	From	Fee	Date	Source
GK	(Greece) Kimon Dimitriou	(Greece) Propontis Chalkida	Free transfer^{[a]}	1 July 1959	
DF	(Greece) Giannis Marditsis	(Greece) Egaleo	₯103,000^{[b]}	1 July 1959	
DF	(Greece) Dimitris Diakakis	Free agent	Free transfer	1 July 1959	
DF	(Greece) Petros Stamatelopoulos	(Greece) Panerythraikos	₯100,000	3 August 1959	
FW	(Greece) Alekos Sofianidis	(Turkey) Beşiktaş	Free transfer	30 July 1959	
FW	(Greece) Stefanos Demiris	(Greece) AE Kavala	Free transfer	1 July 1959	

a. plus Kostas Poulis and Bounas, Temponeras, Valsamis and Kokkinidis from the reserve team.

b. plus Stavros Giafaloglou, Giannis Chaniotis and Kostas Chatzimichail.

=== Out ===
Pos.	Player	To	Fee	Date	Source
GK	(Greece) Anastasiou	Free agent	Contract termination	1 July 1959	
DF	(Greece) Lelos Adamantidis	(Greece) Pankorinthiakos	Contract termination	1 July 1959	
MF	(Greece) Giannis Kanakis	Retired		1 February 1960	
MF	(Greece) Kostas Poulis	(Greece) Propontis Chalkida	Free transfer	1 July 1959	
MF	(Greece) Stavros Giafaloglou	(Greece) Egaleo	Free transfer	1 July 1959	
FW	(Greece) Giannis Chaniotis	(Greece) Egaleo	Free transfer	1 July 1959	
FW	(Greece) Kostas Chatzimichail	(Greece) Egaleo	Free transfer	1 July 1959	
FW	(Greece) Panagiotis Kourtidis	Free agent	Contract termination	1 July 1959	

=== Overall transfer activity ===
Expenditure: ▼ ₯203,000

Income: ▲ ₯0

Net Total: ▼ ₯203,000

== Pre-season and friendlies ==
30 August 1959 Friendly	AEK Athens	8–1	Kronos	Nea Filadelfeia
	Goal		Goal	Stadium: AEK Stadium

2 September 1959 Friendly	AEK Athens	7–0	Eleftheroupoli	Nea Filadelfeia
	Goal			Stadium: AEK Stadium

6 September 1959 Friendly	PAOK	1–0	AEK Athens	Thessaloniki
17:30 EET (UTC+2)	Kiourtzis 21'	Report		Stadium: Toumba Stadium; Attendance: 15,000
Note: Ιnauguration of the Toumba Stadium.

14 September 1959 Friendly	AEK Athens	8–1	Athinaikos	Nea Filadelfeia
	Goal		Goal	Stadium: AEK Stadium

16 September 1959 Friendly	AEK Athens	4–2	AO Karava	Nea Filadelfeia
	Goal		Goal	Stadium: AEK Stadium

20 September 1959 Friendly	AEK Athens	4–0	Asteras Athens	Nea Filadelfeia
	Goal			Stadium: AEK Stadium

27 September 1959 Friendly	AEK Athens	2–0	Atromitos	Nea Filadelfeia
	Goal			Stadium: AEK Stadium

30 September 1959 Friendly	AEK Athens	4–1	Poseidon Glyfada	Nea Filadelfeia
	Goal		Goal	Stadium: AEK Stadium

4 October 1959 Friendly	AEK Athens	1–1	AE Nikaias	Nea Filadelfeia
	Goal		Goal	Stadium: AEK Stadium

17 October 1959 Friendly	AEK Athens	3–0	Ethnikos Piraeus	Nea Filadelfeia
	Goal			Stadium: AEK Stadium

15 November 1959 Friendly	Panargiakos	2–3	AEK Athens	Argos
	Goal		Goal	Stadium: Argos Municipal Stadium

20 January 1960 Friendly	AEK Athens	1–3	Greece military	Nea Filadelfeia
	Goal		Goal	Stadium: AEK Stadium

24 February 1960 Giannis Kanakis Testimonial	AEK Athens	2–0	Greece	Nea Filadelfeia
	Goal			Stadium: AEK Stadium
Note: 45-minute match.

24 February 1960 Giannis Kanakis Testimonial	AEK Athens	2–2	Greece military	Nea Filadelfeia
	Goal		Goal	Stadium: AEK Stadium
Note: 45-minute match.

17 April 1960 Friendly	AEK Athens	2–2	First Vienna	Nea Filadelfeia
	Goal		Senekowitsch	Stadium: AEK Stadium

16 May 1960 Friendly	AEK Athens	1–1	América Mineiro	Nea Filadelfeia
	Goal		Goal	Stadium: AEK Stadium

6 June 1960 Friendly	AEK Athens	1–1	Flamengo	Nea Filadelfeia
	Goal		Goal	Stadium: AEK Stadium

== Competitions ==
=== Overall record ===
Competition	First match	Last match	Starting round	Final position	Record							
Competition	First match	Last match	Starting round	Final position	Pld	W	D	L	GF	GA	GD	Win %
Alpha Ethniki	25 October 1959	24 July 1960	Matchday 1	2nd	30	21	7	2	72	27	+45	70.00
Championship play-off	31 July 1960		Final	Runners-up	1	0	0	1	1	2	−1	0.00
Greek Cup	23 September 1959	10 April 1960	First round	Round of 32	7	6	0	1	26	5	+21	85.71
Total					38	27	7	4	99	34	+65	71.05

Last updated: 31 July 1960
Source: Competitions

=== Alpha Ethniki ===
==== League table ====
Pos	Team	Pld	W	D	L	GF	GA	GD	Pts	Qualification or relegation
1	Panathinaikos (C)	30	22	5	3	59	20	+39	79 (Note: Championship Play-off: Panathinaikos–AEK Athens 2–1 (see below).)	Qualification for European Cup
2	AEK Athens	30	21	7	2	72	27	+45	79	
3	Olympiacos	30	16	8	6	52	24	+28	70	
4	Apollon Athens	30	13	10	7	52	33	+19	66	
5	Panionios	30	14	6	10	46	31	+15	64	

Source: RSSSF
Rules for classification: 1st points; 2nd decision match; 3rd head-to-head goal difference.
(C) Champions

==== Results summary ====
Overall								Home						Away					
Pld	W	D	L	GF	GA	GD	Pts	W	D	L	GF	GA	GD	W	D	L	GF	GA	GD
30	21	7	2	72	27	+45	79	14	1	0	47	11	+36	7	6	2	25	16	+9

Source: Competitive matches

==== Results by Matchday ====
Round	1	2	3	4	5	6	7	8	9	10	11	12	13	14	15	16	17	18	19	20	21	22	23	24	25	26	27	28	29	30
Ground	A	Η	A	H	A	H	A	A	A	H	A	H	H	A	H	H	A	H	A	H	A	H	H	H	A	H	A	A	H	A
Result	W	W	D	W	L	W	W	W	D	W	D	W	D	D	W	W	D	W	W	W	W	W	W	W	W	W	D	W	W	L
Position	3	2	2	1	5	3	3	1	2	2	2	1	1	1	1	1	1	1	1	1	1	1	1	1	1	1	1	1	1	2

Source: Competitive matches
A = Away; H = Home; W = Win; D = Draw; L = Loss; P = Postponed

==== Matches ====
25 October 1959 1	Ethnikos Piraeus	0–1	AEK Athens	Piraeus
13:15 EET (UTC+2)			Kanakis 3'	Stadium: Karaiskakis Stadium; Attendance: 9,134; Referee: Aristidis Ioannidis (Thessaloniki)
Note: Giannis Kanakis scored the first goal in the history of the first division.

1 November 1959 2	AEK Athens	5–1	Pankorinthiakos	Nea Filadelfeia
13:15 EET (UTC+2)	Stamatiadis 1', 36'; Nestoridis 14', 44'; Sofianidis 22'		Kois 69' (pen.)	Stadium: Nikos Goumas Stadium; Attendance: 12,000; Referee: Koulouvardis (Athens)

8 November 1959 3	Panathinaikos	2–2	AEK Athens	Ampelokipoi
15:00 EET (UTC+2)	Papaemmanouil 10'; Benardos 67'		Demiris 3', 71'	Stadium: Leoforos Alexandras Stadium; Attendance: 22,956; Referee: Dimosthenis Stathatos (Athens)

19 November 1959 4	AEK Athens	3–0	Iraklis	Nea Filadelfeia
15:00 EET (UTC+2)	Stamatiadis 11'; Nestoridis 85'; Kanakis 89'			Stadium: AEK Stadium; Attendance: 7,251; Referee: Achilleas Grammatikopoulos (Piraeus)
Note: The game was originally for 11 November, but was postponed due to obligations of some players with the national team.

22 November 1959 5	Doxa Drama	2–0	AEK Athens	Drama
15:00 EET (UTC+2)	Grigoriadis 28'; Ioannou 77'			Stadium: Doxa Drama Stadium; Attendance: 4,825; Referee: Petros Tzouvaras (Thessaloniki)
Note: At the 80th minute Anastasiadis left the game due to an injury.

29 November 1959 6	AEK Athens	2–0	AE Nikaia	Nea Filadelfeia
15:00 EET (UTC+2)	Nestoridis 16', 87'			Stadium: AEK Stadium; Attendance: 4,658; Referee: Papaioannou

6 December 1959 7	Panegialios	1–4	AEK Athens	Aigio
15:00 EET (UTC+2)	Makris 71'		Nestoridis 15', 40', 51'; Ampos 34'	Stadium: Aigio National Stadium; Attendance: 4,876; Referee: Thodoros Giavropoulos (Piraeus)
Note: Kostas Nestoridis scored the first hat-trick in the history of the first division.

13 December 1959 8	PAOK	1–2	AEK Athens	Thessaloniki
14:45 EET (UTC+2)	Nikolaidis 74'		Kemanidis 30' (o.g.); Nestoridis 88'	Stadium: Toumba Stadium; Attendance: 14,230; Referee: Vangelis Damalitis (Piraeus)

20 December 1959 9	Apollon Athens	0–0	AEK Athens	Ampelokipoi
15:00 EET (UTC+2)				Stadium: Leoforos Alexandras Stadium; Attendance: 22,799; Referee: Vangelis Vernardakis (Piraeus)

10 January 1960 10	AEK Athens	1–0	Olympiacos	Nea Filadelfeia
15:00 EET (UTC+2)	Nestoridis 1'			Stadium: AEK Stadium; Attendance: 20,000; Referee: Gottfried Dienst (Switzerland)
Note: The way Nestoridis scored in the first minute of the match was predicted by Nestoridis himself, who had declared it to the goalkeeper of Olympiacos, Savvas Theodoridis, before the start of the game. The song of Vangelis Perpiniadis: "And like Nestoridis, no one will be, to say where the ball will be sent.” (Greek: “Και σαν τον Νεστορίδη κανένας δεν θα βγεί,να λέει πως η μπάλα εκεί θα καρφωθεί.”) was taken from this incident.

27 January 1960 11	Aris	2–2	AEK Athens	Thessaloniki
	Kalliotzis 27'; Panagoulias 46'		Sofianidis 24'; Petridis 78'	Stadium: Aris Stadium; Attendance: 12,577; Referee: Gino Rigato (Italy)
Note: The match originally took place on 17 January and at the 84th minute, while the score was 2–1 in favor of Aris with the goals of Grigoriadis, Sismanidis and Petridis, the players of AEK requested a penalty after a tackle of Kemalidis to Sofianidis. That resulted in incidents taking place among the players of both clubs. The referee Damalitis suspended the match, as did not want to continue, not allowing the linesman, Sidiropoulos to take his place. In addition, he did not hand over the match sheet and never clarified whether he gave a penalty kick or a foul. That was the second time in the match that AEK were denied a penalty, since earlier in the game, Nestoridis, who was alone in front of goal and having passed the goalkeeper was tackled with a knee in the back by Grigoriadis, with the referee showing a corner kick.

24 January 1960 12	AEK Athens	4–2	Proodeftiki	Nea Filadelfeia
	Stamatiadis 23', 42'; Filios 27' (o.g.); Nestoridis 70' (pen.)		Christofidis 38'; Besis 47'	Stadium: AEK Stadium; Attendance: 8,247; Referee: Giovanni Rebuffo (Italy)

31 January 1960 13	AEK Athens	0–0	Megas Alexandros Katerinis	Nea Filadelfeia
				Stadium: Nikos Goumas Stadium; Attendance: 5,895

7 February 1960 14	Apollon Kalamarias	1–1	AEK Athens	Thessaloniki
	Nifadopoulos 25'; Avramidis (red card) 37'		Petridis 87'	Stadium: Toumba Stadium; Attendance: 1,072; Referee: Davala (Italy)

14 February 1960 15	AEK Athens	2–0	Panionios	Nea Filadelfeia
	Ampos 63'; Petridis 82'			Stadium: AEK Stadium; Attendance: 12,000; Referee: Apostolopoulos (Patras)

21 February 1960 16	AEK Athens	4–0	Ethnikos Piraeus	Nea Filadelfeia
	Petridis 30'; Nestoridis 61', 72', 87'			Stadium: AEK Stadium; Attendance: 10,500; Referee: Viktor Schicker (Switzerland)

28 February 1960 17	Pankorinthiakos	0–0	AEK Athens	Corinth
				Stadium: KEN Corinth; Attendance: 8,242; Referee: Aristidis Ioannidis (Thessaloniki)

9 March 1960 18	AEK Athens	1–0	Panathinaikos	Nea Filadelfeia
	Nestoridis 37'			Stadium: AEK Stadium; Attendance: 19,090; Referee: Daniel Mellet (Switzerland)

13 March 1960 19	Iraklis	0–1	AEK Athens	Thessaloniki
	Chasekidis (red card) 69'; Ioannidis (penalty missed) 87'		Ampos 31'	Stadium: Aris Stadium; Attendance: 11,075; Referee: Albert Guinnard (Switzerland)

6 April 1960 20	AEK Athens	4–3	Doxa Drama	Nea Filadelfeia
	Nestoridis 16', 29', 58', (penalty missed) 29'; Sofianidis 68'		Ioannou 1', 35'; Chatzimichail 47'	Stadium: AEK Stadium; Attendance: 15,545; Referee: Joseph Barbéran (France)
Note: The match day was originally scheduled to take on 20 March, but was canceled due to obligations of the national team.

26 March 1960 21	AE Nikaia	0–3	AEK Athens	Piraeus
15:45 EET (UTC+2)			Stamatiadis 20'; Nestoridis 29'; Petridis 89'	Stadium: Karaiskakis Stadium; Attendance: 10,574; Referee: Vlasić (Yugoslavia)

1 May 1960 22	AEK Athens	4–0	Panegialios	Nea Filadelfeia
	Petridis 55'; Nestoridis 59', 75'; Ampos 90'		Zevgolis (red card) 81'	Stadium: AEK Stadium; Attendance: 9,401; Referee: Giuseppe Adami (Italy)

8 May 1960 23	AEK Athens	3–1	PAOK	Nea Filadelfeia
16:15 EET (UTC+2)	Ampos 2'; Nestoridis 51'; Petridis 55'		Chavanidis 58'	Stadium: AEK Stadium; Attendance: 13,000; Referee: Gottfried Dienst (Switzerland)

5 June 1960 24	AEK Athens	5–2	Apollon Athens	Nea Filadelfeia
	Sofianidis 22', 87'; Stamatiadis 47'; Nestoridis 65', 74'		Mastrakoulis 58'; Dermatis (red card) 60'; Kamaras 89'	Stadium: AEK Stadium; Attendance: 11,906; Referee: Othmar Huber (Switzerland)
Note: The match day was originally scheduled to take place on 15 May, but was canceled due to obligations of the national military team.

12 June 1960 25	Olympiacos	0–1	AEK Athens	Nea Filadelfeia
			Stamatiadis 63'	Stadium: AEK Stadium; Attendance: 20,876; Referee: Manuel Asensi Martín (Spain)
Note: The match day was originally scheduled to take place on 22 May, but was canceled due to obligations of the national military team.

29 May 1960 26	AEK Athens	3–0	Aris	Nea Filadelfeia
	Nestoridis 33' (pen.); Stamatiadis 78', 88'		Perros (red card) 34'	Stadium: AEK Stadium; Attendance: 12,450; Referee: Josef Shleiffer (Israel)

18 June 1960 27	Proodeftiki	2–2	AEK Athens	Piraeus
	Marditsis 44' (o.g.); Serafidis 64' (o.g.)		Nestoridis 8'; Petridis 47'; Anastasiadis (red card) 67'	Stadium: Karaiskakis Stadium; Attendance: 18,350; Referee: Konstantin Zečević (Yugoslavia)

26 June 1960 28	Megas Alexandros Katerinis	2–4	AEK Athens	Veria
	Karafoulidis 63'; Amanatidis 86'		Petridis 8', 38'; Nestoridis 30', 56'	Stadium: Veria Stadium; Attendance: 3,617; Referee: Gino Rigato (Italy)

17 July 1960 29	AEK Athens	6–2	Apollon Kalamarias	Nea Filadelfeia
	Papapostolou 3'; Nestoridis 5', 60', 75'; Ampos 34'; Sakellaridis 80' (o.g.)		Avramidis 29'; Nifadopoulos 45'	Stadium: AEK Stadium; Attendance: 9,447; Referee: Carlo Gambarotta (Italy)

24 July 1960 30	Panionios	3–2	AEK Athens	Nea Smyrni
	Saravakos 2'; Braoudakis 44'; Mavridis (red card) 73'; Karras 88'; Kazantzidis (red card) 90'		Polyzos (red card) 73'; Nestoridis 87'; Kazantzidis 90' (o.g.)	Stadium: Nea Smyrni Stadium; Attendance: 7,700; Referee: Giovanni Rebuffo (Italy)

==== Championship play-off ====
31 July 1960 Play-off match	Panathinaikos	2–1	AEK Athens	Piraeus
17:00 EET (UTC+2)	Panakis 35'; Papaemmanouil 48'; Angelopoulos (red card) 53'	Report	Ampos 14'	Stadium: Karaiskakis Stadium; Attendance: 20,923; Referee: Daniel Mele (Switzerland)

=== Greek Cup ===
==== Matches ====
23 September 1959 First round	AEK Athens	5–0	Proodos Patisia	Nea Filadelfeia
15:30 EET (UTC+2)	Ampos 17'; Kanakis 27'; Tsanoulas 52'; Papapostolou 75'; Nestoridis 80'			Stadium: AEK Stadium; Referee: Tatsikas

14 October 1959 Second round	AEK Athens	7–1	Victoria	Nea Filadelfeia
15:00 EET (UTC+2)	Nestoridis 1', 10', 67', 75'; Kanakis 30'; Stamatiadis 53'; Petridis 85'		60'	Stadium: AEK Stadium; Attendance: 2,000; Referee: Alexandros Monastiriotis (Piraeus)

4 November 1959 Third round	AEK Athens	3–1	Ilisiakos	Nea Filadelfeia
	Petridis 28'; Kanakis 69'; Demiris 85'		Perivolas (penalty missed) 35'; Zavoritis 77'	Stadium: AEK Stadium; Referee: Thodoros Giavropoulos (Piraeus)

27 December 1959 Fourth round	AEK Athens	3–1	Dafni Athens	Nea Filadelfeia
	Kanakis 22'; Nestoridis 84' (pen.); Stamatiadis 88'		Angelakis 89'	Stadium: AEK Stadium; Attendance: 3,000; Referee: Koufogiannakis

13 January 1960 Fifth round	AEK Athens	7–0	PAO Kalogreza	Nea Filadelfeia
	Nestoridis 10', 18', 48', 59'; Emmanouilidis 15'; Stamatiadis 27'; Marditsis 85'			Stadium: AEK Stadium; Referee: Vasilis Dimopoulos (Athens)

2 March 1960 Sixth round	AEK Athens	1–0	Atromitos	Nea Filadelfeia
	Stamatiadis 62'			Stadium: Nikos Goumas Stadium; Referee: Tatsikas

10 April 1960 Round of 32	Olympiacos Chalkida	2–0	AEK Athens	Chalcis
	Vlachos 50', 90'			Stadium: Municipal Stadium of Chalkida; Referee: Stamatoglou

== Statistics ==
=== Squad statistics ===
As of 31 July 1960

No.	Pos	Player	Alpha Ethniki		Greek Cup		Total	
No.	Pos	Player	Apps	Goals	Apps	Goals	Apps	Goals
Goalkeepers
—	GK	(Kingdom of Greece) Sotiris Fakis	1	0	3	0	4	0
—	GK	(Kingdom of Greece) Stelios Serafidis	29	0	4	0	33	0
—	GK	(Kingdom of Greece) Kimon Dimitriou	1	0	0	0	1	0
Defenders
—	DF	(Kingdom of Greece) Thanasis Tsangaris	5	0	4	0	9	0
—	DF	(Kingdom of Greece) Giannis Marditsis	29	0	5	1	34	1
—	DF	(Kingdom of Greece) Petros Stamatelopoulos	1	0	2	0	3	0
—	DF	(Kingdom of Greece) Nikos Melissis	2	0	0	0	2	0
—	DF	(Kingdom of Greece) Mimis Anastasiadis	28	0	5	0	33	0
—	DF	(Kingdom of Greece) Antonis Gavanas	0	0	0	0	0	0
—	DF	(Kingdom of Greece) Theofilos Vernezis	26	0	3	0	29	0
—	DF	(Kingdom of Greece) Dimitris Diakakis	3	0	3	0	6	0
Midfielders
—	MF	(Kingdom of Greece) Pavlos Emmanouilidis	13	0	2	1	15	1
—	MF	(Kingdom of Greece) Miltos Papapostolou	28	1	4	1	32	2
—	MF	(Kingdom of Greece) Giorgos Petridis	25	10	4	2	29	12
—	MF	(Kingdom of Greece) Thymios Polyzos	29	0	5	0	34	0
—	MF	(Kingdom of Greece) Kostas Zografos	1	0	4	0	5	0
—	MF	(Kingdom of Greece) Samaras	0	0	1	0	1	0
Forwards
—	FW	(Kingdom of Greece) Kostas Nestoridis	28	32	6	10	34	42
—	FW	(Kingdom of Greece) Alekos Sofianidis	24	5	2	0	26	5
—	FW	(Kingdom of Greece) Andreas Stamatiadis	29	10	7	4	36	14
—	FW	(Kingdom of Greece) Dimitris Tsanoulas	1	0	3	1	4	1
—	FW	(Kingdom of Greece) Christos Ampos	20	7	4	1	24	8
—	FW	(Kingdom of Greece) Argyris Argyropoulos	1	0	0	0	1	0
—	FW	(Kingdom of Greece) Loukas Sismanis	1	0	1	0	2	0
—	FW	(Kingdom of Greece) Stefanos Demiris	10	2	1	1	11	3
Left during season
—	MF	(Kingdom of Greece) Giannis Kanakis	6	2	4	4	10	6

=== Goalscorers ===
As of 31 July 1960
The list is sorted by competition order when total goals are equal, then by position and then alphabetically by surname.

Rank	Pos.	Player	Alpha Ethniki	Greek Cup	Total
1	FW	(Greece) Kostas Nestoridis	32	10	42
2	FW	(Greece) Andreas Stamatiadis	10	4	14
3	MF	(Greece) Giorgos Petridis	10	2	12
4	FW	(Greece) Christos Ampos	7	1	8
5	MF	(Greece) Giannis Kanakis	2	4	6
6	FW	(Greece) Alekos Sofianidis	5	0	5
7	FW	(Greece) Stefanos Demiris	2	1	3
8	MF	(Greece) Miltos Papapostolou	1	1	2
9	DF	(Greece) Giannis Marditsis	0	1	1
9	MF	(Greece) Pavlos Emmanouilidis	0	1	1
9	FW	(Greece) Dimitris Tsanoulas	0	1	1
Own goals			4	0	4
Totals			73	26	99

=== Hat-tricks ===
Numbers in superscript represent the goals that the player scored.

Player	Against	Result	Date	Competition	Source
(Greece) Kostas Nestoridis^{4}	(Greece) Victoria	7–1 (H)	14 October 1959	Greek Cup	
(Greece) Kostas Nestoridis	(Greece) Panegialios	4–1 (A)	6 December 1959	Alpha Ethniki	
(Greece) Kostas Nestoridis^{4}	(Greece) PAO Kalogreza	7–0 (H)	13 January 1960	Greek Cup	
(Greece) Kostas Nestoridis	(Greece) Ethnikos Piraeus	4–0 (H)	21 February 1960	Alpha Ethniki	
(Greece) Kostas Nestoridis	(Greece) Doxa Drama	4–3 (H)	6 April 1960	Alpha Ethniki	
(Greece) Kostas Nestoridis	(Greece) Apollon Kalamarias	6–2 (H)	17 July 1960	Alpha Ethniki	

=== Clean sheets ===
As of 31 July 1960
The list is sorted by competition order when total clean sheets are equal and then alphabetically by surname. Clean sheets in games where both goalkeepers participated are awarded to the goalkeeper who started the game. Goalkeepers with no appearances are not included.

Rank	Player	Alpha Ethniki	Greek Cup	Total
1	(Greece) Stelios Serafidis	15	1	16
2	(Greece) Sotiris Fakis	0	2	2
3	(Greece) Kimon Dimitriou	0	0	0
Totals		15	3	18

=== Disciplinary record ===
As of 31 July 1960

N	P	Nat.	Name	Alpha Ethniki			Greek Cup			Total			Notes
N	P	Nat.	Name	Yellow card	Second yellow card	Red card	Yellow card	Second yellow card	Red card	Yellow card	Second yellow card	Red card	Notes
Goalkeepers
—	GK	(Kingdom of Greece)	Sotiris Fakis										
—	GK	(Kingdom of Greece)	Stelios Serafidis										
—	GK	(Kingdom of Greece)	Kimon Dimitriou										
Defenders
—	DF	(Kingdom of Greece)	Thanasis Tsangaris										
—	DF	(Kingdom of Greece)	Giannis Marditsis										
—	DF	(Kingdom of Greece)	Petros Stamatelopoulos										
—	DF	(Kingdom of Greece)	Nikos Melissis										
—	DF	(Kingdom of Greece)	Mimis Anastasiadis			1						1	
—	DF	(Kingdom of Greece)	Antonis Gavanas										
—	DF	(Kingdom of Greece)	Theofilos Vernezis										
—	DF	(Kingdom of Greece)	Dimitris Diakakis										
Midfielders
—	MF	(Kingdom of Greece)	Pavlos Emmanouilidis										
—	MF	(Kingdom of Greece)	Miltos Papapostolou										
—	MF	(Kingdom of Greece)	Giorgos Petridis										
—	MF	(Kingdom of Greece)	Thymios Polyzos			1						1	
—	MF	(Kingdom of Greece)	Kostas Zografos										
—	MF	(Kingdom of Greece)	Samaras										
Forwards
—	FW	(Kingdom of Greece)	Kostas Nestoridis										
—	FW	(Kingdom of Greece)	Alekos Sofianidis										
—	FW	(Kingdom of Greece)	Andreas Stamatiadis										
—	FW	(Kingdom of Greece)	Dimitris Tsanoulas										
—	FW	(Kingdom of Greece)	Christos Ampos										
—	FW	(Kingdom of Greece)	Argyris Argyropoulos										
—	FW	(Kingdom of Greece)	Loukas Sismanis										
—	FW	(Kingdom of Greece)	Stefanos Demiris										
Left during season
—	MF	(Kingdom of Greece)	Giannis Kanakis										

== Awards ==
Player	Pos.	Award	Source
(Greece) Kostas Nestoridis	FW	Alpha Ethniki Top Scorer	
(Greece) Kostas Nestoridis	FW	Greek Cup Top Scorer	
