= 1961–62 AEK Athens F.C. season =

AEK Athens
1961–62 season
- Chairman: Nikos Goumas
- Manager: Tryfon Tzanetis
- Stadium: AEK Stadium
- Alpha Ethniki: 4th
- Greek Cup: Round of 16
- Top goalscorer: League: Kostas Nestoridis (29); All: Kostas Nestoridis (29)
- Highest home attendance: 35,000 vs Panathinaikos (28 March 1962)
- Lowest home attendance: 3,535 vs Egaleo (4 February 1962)
- Average home league attendance: 12,607
- Biggest win: Egaleo 0–8 AEK Athens
- Biggest defeat: Panathinaikos 4–1 AEK Athens
Home colours	Away colours

The 1961–62 season was the 38th season in the existence of AEK Athens F.C. and their third consecutive season in the top flight of Greek football. They competed in the Alpha Ethniki and the Greek Cup. The season began on 9 September 1961 and finished on 17 June 1962.

== Kits ==
Home	Away

== Overview ==
In the summer of 1961, AEK Athens aimed to compete for the championship. With Tryfon Tzanetis in charge and Kleanthis Maropoulos essentially in the position of technical director, they signed Panikos Krystallis and Dimitris Zagylos from Cyprus, who were regarded as highly talented footballers.

AEK started strongly in the league with three consecutive wins including the emphatic 8–0 away win against Egaleo, which became the widest away win in the top tier of Greek football, while in the 4th matchday they drew 0–0 with Olympiacos in Nea Filadelfeia, even though they were the better side. On the 6th matchday, AEK were at the top of the standings alongside Panathinaikos and Olympiacos, where they remained until the 8th matchday, when, without conceding a single goal, they faced Panathinaikos at Leoforos Alexandras Stadium. AEK fell 2–0 behind, but managed to pull one back to make it 2–1. However, in the last quarter of the match they collapsed, eventually suffering a 4–1 defeat while the "greens" could have extended their lead further. As a result, AEK dropped to second place, but continued to produce good performances. However, they were also defeated by Apollon Athens, who at the time had one of the strongest teams in the league and occupied the top positions in the standings. With various ups and downs, they remained five points behind the leaders until the 28th matchday, when the derby against Panathinaikos took place. In a packed Nea Filadelfeia Stadium, AEK entered the match determined and within the opening half hour they were leading 2–0. Shortly before the end of the half, Panathinaikos managed to reduce the score to 2–1 and during the second half they completed the comeback to win 3–2, largely due to defensive mistakes by the players of AEK. The yellow-blacks then focused on securing second place with Olympiacos and Apollon as their main competitors, however, the latter defeated them at home, overtook them in the standings and AEK eventually finished in fourth place.

In the round of 32 of the Cup, AEK were awarded the tie against Kalamata, as the latter forfeited the match. In the round of 16, they faced Apollon Athens at home and in the presence of fifteen thousand spectators, AEK were defeated by 2–1 and were eliminated. It was the third time Apollon had defeated AEK that season, having already beaten them twice in the league.

== Management team ==
Position	Staff
Manager	(Greece) Tryfon Tzanetis
Technical director	(Greece) Kleanthis Maropoulos
Academy director	(Greece) Georgios Daispangos
Academy manager	(Greece) Georgios Daispangos
Academy manager	(Greece) Kostas Poulis

== Players ==
=== Squad information ===
NOTE: The players are the ones that have been announced by the AEK Athens' press release. No edits should be made unless a player arrival or exit is announced. Updated 17 June 1962, 23:59 UTC+2.

Player	Nat.	Position(s)	Date of birth (Age)	Signed	Previous club	Transfer fee
Goalkeepers
Sotiris Fakis	(Greece)	GK	1934 (aged 27–28)	1957	(Greece) Amyna Ampelokipoi	Free
Stelios Serafidis	(Greece)	GK	6 August 1935 (aged 26)	1953	(Greece) AEK Athens U20	—
Defenders
Giannis Marditsis	(Greece)	CB / ST	19 February 1933 (aged 29)	1959	(Greece) Egaleo	₯103,000
Petros Stamatelopoulos	(Greece)	LB	19 March 1934 (aged 28)	1959	(Greece) Panerythraikos	₯100,000
Mimis Anastasiadis	(Greece)	RB / CB / ST	26 October 1936 (aged 25)	1956	(Greece) A.O. Nea Ionia	Free
Theofilos Vernezis	(Greece)	RB / CB / GK	1938 (aged 23–24)	1956	(Greece) AEK Athens U20	—
Dimitris Tzaneras	(Greece)	CB / DM	1942 (aged 19–20)	1960	(Greece) Atromitos Piraeus	Free
Midfielders
Miltos Papapostolou	(Greece)	DM / CB	9 September 1935 (aged 26)	1956	(Greece) Egaleo	Free
Giorgos Petridis	(Greece)	AM / SS / ST / LW	10 February 1938 (aged 24)	1957	(Greece) Pera Club	Free
Panikos Krystallis	(Cyprus)	AM / SS / CM / RM / LM	1 July 1938 (aged 23)	1961	(Cyprus) Apollon Limassol	₯1,900,000
Stelios Skevofilakas	(Greece)	LM / RM / AM / CM	6 January 1939 (aged 23)	1961	(Greece) Eleftheroupoli	Free
Thanasis Gouvas	(Greece)	AM / RW / SS / ST	April 1939 (aged 23)	1960	(Greece) A.E. Messolonghi	Free
Alekos Daispangos	(Greece)	DM / CB	1942 (aged 19–20)	1960	(Greece) AEK Athens U20	—
Forwards
Kostas Nestoridis	(Greece)	ST / SS / LW / RW	15 March 1930 (aged 32)	1955	(Greece) Panionios	Free
Alekos Sofianidis	(Greece) (Turkey)	LW / LM / LB	3 August 1935 (aged 26)	1959	(Turkey) Beşiktaş	Free
Andreas Stamatiadis (Captain)	(Greece)	RW / LW / SS / AM	16 August 1935 (aged 26)	1952	(Greece) AEK Athens U20	—
Christos Ampos	(Greece)	LW / SS / ST	19 October 1937 (aged 24)	1955	(Greece) A.O. Kifisia	Free
Dimitris Zagylos	(Cyprus)	RW	15 March 1938 (aged 24)	1961	(Cyprus) Anorthosis Famagusta	₯320,000
Argyris Argyropoulos	(Greece)	ST	1939 (aged 22–23)	1958	(Greece) AEK Athens U20	—
Nikos Zagotsis	(Greece)	ST / SS	16 March 1940 (aged 22)	1960	(Greece) AEK Athens U20	—
Aris Tsachouridis	(Greece)	LW / LM / RM / RW	10 December 1940 (aged 21)	1960	(Greece) Makedonikos	Free
Simos Vavaleros	(Greece)	ST	1943 (aged 18–19)	1961	(Greece) Egaleo	Free
Spyros Pomonis	(Greece)	LW / LM	12 February 1944 (aged 18)	1960	(Greece) AEK Athens U20	—
Left during season
Stefanos Demiris	(Greece)	ST / SS / AM	19 January 1941 (aged 21)	1959	(Greece) AE Kavala	—

== Transfers ==
=== In ===
Pos.	Player	From	Fee	Date	Source
MF	(Greece) Stelios Skevofilakas	(Greece) Eleftheroupoli	Free transfer	1 July 1961	
MF	(Cyprus) Panikos Krystallis	(Cyprus) Apollon Limassol	₯1,900,000	1 July 1961	
FW	(Cyprus) Dimitris Zagylos	(Cyprus) Anorthosis Famagusta	₯320,000	1 July 1961	
FW	(Greece) Simos Vavaleros	(Greece) Egaleo	Free transfer	1 July 1961	

=== Out ===
Pos.	Player	To	Fee	Date	Source
GK	(Greece) Kimon Dimitriou	(Greece) Olympiacos Chalkida	Contract termination	1 July 1961	
DF	(Greece) Nikos Melissis	Retired		1 July 1961	
DF	(Greece) Antonis Gavanas	(Greece) Panegialios	Contract termination	1 July 1961	
DF	(Greece) Dimitris Diakakis	Free agent	Contract termination	1 July 1961	
MF	(Greece) Thymios Polyzos	(Greece) AEK Athens U20	Demotion	1 July 1961	
MF	(Greece) Pavlos Emmanouilidis	(Greece) Panachaiki	Contract termination	1 July 1961	
MF	(Greece) Stelios Skevofilakas	(Greece) Eleftheroupoli	Loan return	1 July 1961	
FW	(Greece) Dimitris Tsanoulas	Free agent	Contract termination	1 July 1961	

=== Loan out ===
Pos.	Player	To	Fee	Date	Until	Option to buy	Source
FW	(Greece) Stefanos Demiris	(Greece) Panegialios	Free	1 February 1962	30 June 1963	✗	

=== Overall transfer activity ===
Expenditure: ▼ ₯2,220,000

Income: ▲ ₯0

Net Total: ▼ ₯2,220,000

== Pre-season and friendlies ==
14 October 1961 Friendly	Apollon Limassol	1–6	AEK Athens	Nicosia
	Goal		Goal	Stadium: GSP Stadium

18 October 1961 Friendly	Omonia	1–4	AEK Athens	Nicosia
	Goal		Goal	Stadium: GSP Stadium

28 December 1961 Friendly	AEK Athens	0–1	LASK	Nea Filadelfeia
			Goal	Stadium: AEK Stadium; Referee: Tsatsikas

3 January 1962 Friendly	AEK Athens	0–6	Barcelona	Nea Filadelfeia
		Report	Vicente 4'; Evaristo 22'; Kocsis 38', (penalty missed); Marañón 49'; Pereda 50'; Zaldúa 64'	Stadium: AEK Stadium; Attendance: 31,960
Note: Inauguration of the large stand and turf of the AEK Stadium. The game was attended by the then heir to the Spanish throne Juan Carlos and his future wife, Sofia.

5 January 1962 Friendly	AEK Athens	2–3	Panathinaikos	Nea Filadelfeia
	Goal		Goal	Stadium: AEK Stadium

25 March 1962 Friendly	Olympiacos	1–2	AEK Athens	Nea Filadelfeia
	Psychos 60'	Report	Petridis 19', 47'	Stadium: AEK Stadium
Note: AEK offered the earnings of the match for the construction of the stadium of Olympiacos, repaying the gesture of the latter who had donated all the earnings from their match against Barcelona, two months ago, for the newly built AEK Stadium. Olympiacos were typically the host team, since at the time they often used AEK Stadium as a home ground.

2 May 1962 Friendly	AEK Athens	4–1	Bolton	Nea Filadelfeia
	Krystallis 2'; Stamatiadis 10'; Nestoridis 20', 83'		Hartle 90'	Stadium: AEK Stadium; Attendance: 6,000

24 May 1962 Friendly	AEK Athens	2–5	Barcelona	Nea Filadelfeia
	Goal	Report	Ré 12'; Zaldúa 36', 47', 89'; Pereda 79'	Stadium: AEK Stadium

== Competitions ==
=== Overall record ===
Competition	First match	Last match	Starting round	Final position	Record							
Competition	First match	Last match	Starting round	Final position	Pld	W	D	L	GF	GA	GD	Win %
Alpha Ethniki	9 September 1961	17 June 1962	Matchday 1	4th	30	19	5	6	73	31	+42	63.33
Greek Cup	8 April 1962	16 May 1962	Round of 32	Round of 16	2	1	0	1	3	2	+1	50.00
Total					32	20	5	7	76	33	+43	62.50

Last updated: 17 June 1962
Source: Competitions

=== Alpha Ethniki ===
==== League table ====
Pos	Team	Pld	W	D	L	GF	GA	GD	Pts	Qualification or relegation
2	Olympiacos	30	22	4	4	65	23	+42	78	Qualification for Cup Winners' Cup preliminary round
3	Apollon Athens	30	19	6	5	55	26	+29	74	
4	AEK Athens	30	19	5	6	73	31	+42	73	
5	Panionios (Note: Apollon Kalamarias and Panionios were deducted 1 point each.)	30	12	8	10	43	40	+3	61	
6	PAOK	30	12	6	12	32	43	−11	60	

Source: RSSSF
Rules for classification: 1st points; 2nd decision match; 3rd head-to-head goal difference.

==== Results summary ====
Overall								Home						Away					
Pld	W	D	L	GF	GA	GD	Pts	W	D	L	GF	GA	GD	W	D	L	GF	GA	GD
30	19	5	6	73	31	+42	73	11	2	2	41	13	+28	8	3	4	32	18	+14

Source: Competitive matches

==== Results by Matchday ====
Round	1	2	3	4	5	6	7	8	9	10	11	12	13	14	15	16	17	18	19	20	21	22	23	24	25	26	27	28	29	30
Ground	A	H	A	H	A	A	A	A	A	H	A	A	A	A	H	H	A	H	A	H	H	H	H	H	A	H	H	H	Η	A
Result	W	W	W	D	W	W	W	L	D	W	W	W	L	W	W	W	L	W	D	W	W	W	L	W	L	W	W	L	D	D
Position	1	1	1	2	2	1	1	2	2	2	2	2	3	3	2	2	2	3	3	3	3	3	3	3	4	4	3	4	3	4

Source: Competitive matches
A = Away; H = Home; W = Win; D = Draw; L = Loss; P = Postponed

==== Matches ====
9 September 1961 1	Egaleo	0–8	AEK Athens	Rizoupoli
16:30 EET (UTC+2)	Giafaloglou (penalty missed) 77'		Gouvas 31', 89'; Nestoridis 40', 43', 88'; Petridis 75'; Stamatiadis 80', 85'	Stadium: Rizoupoli Stadium; Attendance: 8,575; Referee: Manolis Panakis (Athens)
Note: Record away win in the history of Greek Championship.

17 September 1961 2	AEK Athens	2–0	Niki Volos	Ampelokipoi
16:30 EET (UTC+2)	Nestoridis 15' (pen.), (penalty missed) 68'; Gouvas 53'			Stadium: Leoforos Alexandras Stadium; Attendance: 12,338; Referee: Patsanian (Piraeus)
Note: Match held at Leoforos Alexandras Stadium, due to the construction works at AEK Stadium.

24 September 1961 3	Panionios	0–1	AEK Athens	Nea Smyrni
16:00 EET (UTC+2)			Petridis 42'	Stadium: Nea Smyrni Stadium; Attendance: 14,000; Referee: Stathis Papavasiliou (Piraeus)

1 October 1961 4	AEK Athens	0–0	Olympiacos	Ampelokipoi
15:15 EET (UTC+2)				Stadium: Leoforos Alexandras Stadium; Attendance: 26,000; Referee: Karl Keller (Switzerland)
Note: Held at Leoforos Alexandras Stadium, due to the construction works at AEK Stadium.

8 October 1961 5	Doxa Drama	0–4	AEK Athens	Drama
15:15 EET (UTC+2)			Nestoridis 18' (pen.), 40' (pen.), 58'; Zagylos 58'	Stadium: Doxa Drama Stadium; Attendance: 4,556; Referee: Leonidas Vambakopoulos (Athens)

5 November 1961 6	Fostiras	0–1	AEK Athens	Tavros
15:00 EET (UTC+2)	Deimezis (red card) 15'		Nestoridis 13' (pen.)	Stadium: Tavros Stadium; Attendance: 9,314; Referee: Alexandros Monastiriotis (Piraeus)

12 November 1961 7	Ethnikos Piraeus	0–1	AEK Athens	Piraeus
15:00 EET (UTC+2)			Nestoridis 46'	Stadium: Karaiskakis Stadium; Attendance: 16,877; Referee: Spanos (Patras)

19 November 1961 8	Panathinaikos	4–1	AEK Athens	Ampelokipoi
15:00 EET (UTC+2)	Cholevas 25', 39', 84'; Theofanis 80'		Krystallis 79'	Stadium: Leoforos Alexandras Stadium; Attendance: 24,738; Referee: Alfred Haberfellner (Austria)

26 November 1961 9	Aris	0–0	AEK Athens	Thessaloniki
15:00 EET (UTC+2)				Stadium: Aris Stadium; Attendance: 11,000; Referee: Giorgos Chavelas (Piraeus)
Note: In the 38th minute, Serafidis was injured and Sofianidis took his place in the goalpost until the end of the half.

3 December 1961 10	AEK Athens	2–0	Iraklis	Ampelokipoi
15:00 EET (UTC+2)	Demiris 5'; Nestoridis 82'			Stadium: Leoforos Alexandras Stadium; Attendance: 16,906; Referee: Giorgos Pelomis (Athens)
Note: Match held at Leoforos Alexandras Stadium, due to the construction works at AEK Stadium.

10 December 1961 11	PAOK	1–2	AEK Athens	Thessaloniki
15:00 EET (UTC+2)	Kiourtzis 25'		Nestoridis 14' (pen.), 83'	Stadium: Toumba Stadium; Attendance: 13,276; Referee: Cesare Jonni (Italy)

16 December 1961 12	Panelefsiniakos	3–6	AEK Athens	Piraeus
15:00 EET (UTC+2)	Dimas 56'; Karmponis 62', 88'		Nestoridis 10'; Petridis 32', 59', 75'; Kiourtzis 35' (o.g.); Stamatiadis 37'	Stadium: Karaiskakis Stadium; Attendance: 6,636; Referee: Timoleon Latsios (Larissa)

14 January 1962 13	Apollon Athens	2–0	AEK Athens	Nea Smyrni
15:00 EET (UTC+2)	Simigdalas 1'; Kamaras 68' (pen.)			Stadium: Nea Smyrni Stadium; Attendance: 16,535; Referee: Aleksandar Skorić (Yugoslavia)

20 January 1962 14	Proodeftiki	2–4	AEK Athens	Piraeus
15:00 EET (UTC+2)	Daoutis 30'; Mesolongitis 39'		Petridis 14', 48'; Nestoridis (penalty missed) 32', 50'; Stamatiadis 76'	Stadium: Karaiskakis Stadium; Attendance: 12,028; Referee: Vangelis Pazaropoulos (Athens)

28 January 1962 15	AEK Athens	5–0	Apollon Kalamarias	Nea Filadelfeia
15:15 EET (UTC+2)	Nestoridis 5'; Tsachouridis 25'; Skevofilakas 53' (pen.); Stamatiadis 64'; Petridis 79'			Stadium: AEK Stadium; Attendance: 9,732; Referee: Alexandros Monastiriotis (Piraeus)

4 February 1962 16	AEK Athens	2–0	Egaleo	Nea Filadelfeia
	Tsachouridis 59'; Petridis 68'			Stadium: AEK Stadium; Attendance: 3,535; Referee: Periklis Poulias (Athens)

11 February 1962 17	Niki Volos	2–1	AEK Athens	Volos
15:30 EET (UTC+2)	Zanteroglou 74'; Lales 85'		Tsachouridis 75'	Stadium: Niki Volos Stadium; Attendance: 7,000; Referee: Vangelis Vernardakis (Piraeus)

18 February 1962 18	AEK Athens	4–1	Panionios	Nea Filadelfeia
15:30 EET (UTC+2)	Petridis 12', 52'; Krystallis 27'; Tsachouridis 77'		Chaitas 74'	Stadium: AEK Stadium; Attendance: 15,263; Referee: Thodoros Giavropoulos (Piraeus)

25 February 1962 19	Olympiacos	0–0	AEK Athens	Nea Filadelfeia
15:30 EET (UTC+2)				Stadium: AEK Stadium; Attendance: 20,795; Referee: Avraham Dudai (Israel)

4 March 1962 20	AEK Athens	3–1	Doxa Drama	Nea Filadelfeia
15:45 EET (UTC+2)	Nestoridis 8', (penalty missed) 43'; Skevofilakas 30' (pen.); Stamatiadis 60'		Grigoriadis 76'	Stadium: AEK Stadium; Attendance: 9,890; Referee: Thomas Vergotis (Rhodes)

11 March 1962 21	AEK Athens	3–1	Fostiras	Nea Filadelfeia
15:45 EET (UTC+2)	Stamatiadis 54'; Nestoridis 64', 78'		Deimezis 11'	Stadium: AEK Stadium; Attendance: 10,000; Referee: Petros Tzouvaras (Thessaly)

18 March 1962 22	AEK Athens	2–0	Ethnikos Piraeus	Nea Filadelfeia
16:00 EET (UTC+2)	Nestoridis 20'; Petridis 22'			Stadium: AEK Stadium; Attendance: 10,865; Referee: Kostas Xanthos (Dodecanese)

28 March 1962 23	AEK Athens	2–3	Panathinaikos	Nea Filadelfeia
16:00 EET (UTC+2)	Tsachouridis 2'; Stamatiadis 32'		Toumpelis 40', 48'; Domazos 73'	Stadium: AEK Stadium; Attendance: 35,000; Referee: Eduardo Rosa Gouveia (Portugal)

1 April 1962 24	AEK Athens	1–0	Aris	Nea Filadelfeia
16:00 EET (UTC+2)	Nestoridis 32'			Stadium: AEK Stadium; Attendance: 5,920; Referee: Giannis Adamakis (Chalkida)

15 April 1962 25	Iraklis	2–1	AEK Athens	Thessaloniki
16:30 EET (UTC+2)	Marnas 34', 90'		Stamatiadis 69'	Stadium: Kaftanzoglio Stadium; Attendance: 5,371; Referee: Alexandros Monastiriotis (Piraeus)

13 May 1962 26	AEK Athens	6–2	PAOK	Nea Filadelfeia
16:45 EET (UTC+2)	Zagylos 16'; Nestoridis 24', 90'; Tsachouridis 58'; Gouvas 59'; Skevofilakas 74'		Giakoumis 1', 51'	Stadium: AEK Stadium; Attendance: 11,000; Referee: Petros Tzouvaras (Thessaly)
Note: The first of the six games that the defender Theofilos Vernezis played as a goalkeeper, due to the injury of both goalkeepers Serafidis and Fakis.

20 May 1962 27	AEK Athens	8–3	Panelefsiniakos	Nea Filadelfeia
16:45 EET (UTC+2)	Stamatiadis 6', 79'; Nestoridis 16', 26', 53', 61'; Tsachouridis 68'; Zagylos 73'		Mouratis 43', 83' (pen.); Karmponis 70'	Stadium: Nikos Goumas Stadium; Attendance: 4,000; Referee: Giorgos Abatzoglou (Athens)

27 May 1962 28	AEK Athens	0–1	Apollon Athens	Nea Filadelfeia
17:00 EET (UTC+2)			Kamaras 4'	Stadium: AEK Stadium; Attendance: 15,000; Referee: Giannis Korkidis (Athens)

10 June 1962 29	AEK Athens	1–1	Proodeftiki	Nea Filadelfeia
17:30 EET (UTC+2)	Balopoulos 27'		Nestoridis 48'	Stadium: AEK Stadium; Attendance: 5,000; Referee: Kostas Xanthos (Dodecanese)

17 June 1962 30	Apollon Kalamarias	2–2	AEK Athens	Thessaloniki
17:30 EET (UTC+2)	Tsampakidis 52'; Mitariotis 84'		Nestoridis 12' (pen.), 45'	Stadium: Toumba Stadium; Attendance: 2,000; Referee: Giannis Zogas (Athens)

=== Greek Cup ===
AEK entered the Greek Cup at the round of 32.

==== Matches ====
8 April 1962 Round of 32	Kalamata	0–2 (Awarded)	AEK Athens
Note: On 4 of April Kalamata declared to the HFF their resignation from the game and was awarded to AEK with 0–2 by regulation.

16 May 1962 Round of 16	AEK Athens	1–2	Apollon Athens	Nea Filadelfeia
16:30 EET (UTC+2)	Tsachouridis 9'		Anastopoulos 35'; Simigdalas 88'	Stadium: AEK Stadium; Attendance: 15,000; Referee: Stathis Papavasiliou (Piraeus)

== Statistics ==
=== Squad statistics ===
As of 17 June 1962

No.	Pos	Player	Alpha Ethniki		Greek Cup		Total	
No.	Pos	Player	Apps	Goals	Apps	Goals	Apps	Goals
Goalkeepers
—	GK	(Kingdom of Greece) Sotiris Fakis	7	0	0	0	7	0
—	GK	(Kingdom of Greece) Stelios Serafidis	18	0	0	0	18	0
Defenders
—	DF	(Kingdom of Greece) Giannis Marditsis	28	0	1	0	29	0
—	DF	(Kingdom of Greece) Petros Stamatelopoulos	8	0	1	0	9	0
—	DF	(Kingdom of Greece) Mimis Anastasiadis	22	0	0	0	22	0
—	DF	(Kingdom of Greece) Theofilos Vernezis	5	0	1	0	6	0
—	DF	(Kingdom of Greece) Dimitris Tzaneras	2	0	0	0	2	0
Midfielders
—	MF	(Kingdom of Greece) Miltos Papapostolou	27	0	1	0	28	0
—	MF	(Kingdom of Greece) Giorgos Petridis	26	12	1	0	27	12
—	MF	(Cyprus) Panikos Krystallis	24	2	1	0	25	2
—	MF	(Kingdom of Greece) Stelios Skevofilakas	30	3	1	0	31	3
—	MF	(Kingdom of Greece) Thanasis Gouvas	14	4	0	0	14	4
—	MF	(Kingdom of Greece) Alekos Daispangos	0	0	0	0	0	0
Forwards
—	FW	(Kingdom of Greece) Kostas Nestoridis	29	29	1	0	30	29
—	FW	(Kingdom of Greece) Alekos Sofianidis	29	0	1	0	30	0
—	FW	(Kingdom of Greece) Andreas Stamatiadis	24	11	0	0	24	11
—	FW	(Kingdom of Greece) Christos Ampos	1	0	0	0	1	0
—	FW	(Cyprus) Dimitris Zagylos	15	3	1	0	16	3
—	FW	(Kingdom of Greece) Argyris Argyropoulos	0	0	0	0	0	0
—	FW	(Kingdom of Greece) Nikos Zagotsis	0	0	0	0	0	0
—	FW	(Kingdom of Greece) Aris Tsachouridis	16	7	1	1	17	8
—	FW	(Kingdom of Greece) Simos Vavaleros	1	0	0	0	1	0
—	FW	(Kingdom of Greece) Spyros Pomonis	0	0	0	0	0	0
Left during season
—	FW	(Kingdom of Greece) Stefanos Demiris	4	1	0	0	4	1

=== Goalscorers ===
As of 17 June 1962
The list is sorted by competition order when total goals are equal, then by position and then alphabetically by surname.

Rank	Pos.	Player	Alpha Ethniki	Greek Cup	Total
1	FW	(Greece) Kostas Nestoridis	29	0	29
2	MF	(Greece) Giorgos Petridis	12	0	12
3	FW	(Greece) Andreas Stamatiadis	11	0	11
4	FW	(Greece) Aris Tsachouridis	7	1	8
5	MF	(Greece) Thanasis Gouvas	4	0	4
6	MF	(Greece) Stelios Skevofilakas	3	0	3
6	FW	(Cyprus) Dimitris Zagylos	3	0	3
8	MF	(Cyprus) Panikos Krystallis	2	0	2
9	FW	(Greece) Stefanos Demiris	1	0	1
Own goals			1	0	1
Totals			73	1	74

=== Hat-tricks ===
Numbers in superscript represent the goals that the player scored.

Player	Against	Result	Date	Competition	Source
(Greece) Kostas Nestoridis	(Greece) Egaleo	8–0 (A)	9 September 1961	Alpha Ethniki	
(Greece) Kostas Nestoridis	(Greece) Doxa Drama	4–0 (A)	8 October 1961	Alpha Ethniki	
(Greece) Giorgos Petridis	(Greece) Panelefsiniakos	6–3 (A)	16 December 1961	Alpha Ethniki	
(Greece) Kostas Nestoridis^{4}	(Greece) Panelefsiniakos	8–3 (H)	20 May 1962	Alpha Ethniki	

=== Clean sheets ===
As of 17 June 1962
The list is sorted by competition order when total clean sheets are equal and then alphabetically by surname. Clean sheets in games where both goalkeepers participated are awarded to the goalkeeper who started the game. Goalkeepers with no appearances are not included.

Rank	Player	Alpha Ethniki	Greek Cup	Total
1	(Greece) Stelios Serafidis	10	0	10
2	(Greece) Sotiris Fakis	4	0	4
3	(Greece) Theofilos Vernezis	0	0	0
Totals		14	0	14

=== Disciplinary record ===
As of 17 June 1962

N	P	Nat.	Name	Alpha Ethniki			Greek Cup			Total			Notes
N	P	Nat.	Name	Yellow card	Second yellow card	Red card	Yellow card	Second yellow card	Red card	Yellow card	Second yellow card	Red card	Notes
Goalkeepers
—	GK	(Kingdom of Greece)	Sotiris Fakis										
—	GK	(Kingdom of Greece)	Stelios Serafidis										
Defenders
—	DF	(Kingdom of Greece)	Giannis Marditsis										
—	DF	(Kingdom of Greece)	Petros Stamatelopoulos										
—	DF	(Kingdom of Greece)	Mimis Anastasiadis										
—	DF	(Kingdom of Greece)	Theofilos Vernezis										
—	DF	(Kingdom of Greece)	Dimitris Tzaneras										
Midfielders
—	MF	(Kingdom of Greece)	Miltos Papapostolou										
—	MF	(Kingdom of Greece)	Giorgos Petridis										
—	MF	(Cyprus)	Panikos Krystallis										
—	MF	(Kingdom of Greece)	Stelios Skevofilakas										
—	MF	(Kingdom of Greece)	Thanasis Gouvas										
—	MF	(Kingdom of Greece)	Alekos Daispangos										
Forwards
—	FW	(Kingdom of Greece)	Kostas Nestoridis										
—	FW	(Kingdom of Greece)	Alekos Sofianidis										
—	FW	(Kingdom of Greece)	Andreas Stamatiadis										
—	FW	(Kingdom of Greece)	Christos Ampos										
—	FW	(Cyprus)	Dimitris Zagylos										
—	FW	(Kingdom of Greece)	Argyris Argyropoulos										
—	FW	(Kingdom of Greece)	Nikos Zagotsis										
—	FW	(Kingdom of Greece)	Aris Tsachouridis										
—	FW	(Kingdom of Greece)	Simos Vavaleros										
—	FW	(Kingdom of Greece)	Spyros Pomonis										
Left during season
—	FW	(Kingdom of Greece)	Stefanos Demiris										

== Awards ==
Player	Pos.	Award	Source
(Greece) Kostas Nestoridis	FW	Alpha Ethniki Top Scorer	
