= Stamatelopoulos =

Stamatelopoulos is a surname. Notable people with the surname include:

- Apostolos Stamatelopoulos (born 1999), Australian soccer player
- Petros Stamatelopoulos (1934–2011), Greek footballer

== See also ==
- Nikitaras (1784–1849), born Nikitas Stamatelopoulos; Greek revolutionary
