= Giannis Chaniotis =

Greek footballer (1934–2024)

Personal information
- Full name: Ioannis Chaniotis
- Date of birth: 21 March 1934
- Place of birth: Piraeus, Greece
- Date of death: 3 February 2024 (aged 89)
- Place of death: Sydney, Australia
- Height: 1.80 m (5 ft 11 in)
- Position: Forward

Youth career
- 1950–1951: Atromitos Kaminia
- 1951–1953: Atromitos Piraeus

Senior career*
Years	Team	Apps	(Gls)
1953–1955	Atromitos Piraeus		
1955–1959	AEK Athens	4	(2)
1959–1961	Egaleo	33	(16)
- * Club domestic league appearances and goals

Giannis Chaniotis (Greek: Γιάννης Χανιώτης; 21 March 1934 – 3 February 2024) was a Greek footballer who played as a forward. He was a prolific scorer and "star player" of AEK Athens during the 1950s.

== Club career ==
Chaniotis started his football career at Atromitos Piraeus and in the summer of 1955 he was transferred to AEK Athens. At the age of 21 he had already become a regular within the team. He distinguished himself in the AFCA championships and in the final phase of the Panhellenic Championship. His contribution to winning the Greek Cup in 1956 was crucial, as he was the scorer of both goals in the 2–1 victory over Panathinaikos in the semi-final and he scored the opener in the 2–1 victory over Olympiacos in the final.

In the summer of 1959, following the recommendation of the then coach Tryfon Tzanetis, AEK signed Giannis Marditsis from Egaleo, giving Chaniotis along with Stavros Giafaloglou, Kostas Chatzimichail, Chrysakis and Karalis as exchange. He helped Egaleo to achieve their promotion to Alpha Ethniki. There he took part in 33 championship matches, scoring 16 goals and in the Greek Cup he also scored 15 goals. His record was 7 goals against A.E. Chalandri, on 23 September 1959 in Egaleo's victory with a score of 13–0.

== Personal life ==
In 1961, at the age of 27, Chaniotis immigrated permanently to Australia. The following year, he married Anastasia Vasilatos and together they had three children. He lived for the rest of his life there until 3 February 2024, when he died after suffering from long-term health problems.

== Honours ==
AEK Athens

- Greek Cup: 1955–56
