= Andreas Stamatiadis =

Greek footballer and manager (1935–2025)

- Stamatiadis with AEK Athens

Personal information
- Date of birth: 16 August 1935
- Place of birth: Petralona, Athens, Greece
- Date of death: 23 January 2025 (aged 89)
- Place of death: Athens, Greece
- Height: 1.67 m (5 ft 6 in)
- Position: Forward

Youth career
- 1947–1950: AE Melandria
- 1950–1952: AEK Athens

Senior career*
Years	Team	Apps	(Gls)
1952–1969	AEK Athens	316	(78)
Total		316	(78)

International career
1954–1963	Greece	8	(0)
1960	Greece Olympic	2	(0)

Managerial career
- 1969–1970: Rodos
- 1970–1971: Trikala
- 1971–1972: Lamia
- 1973–1974: Anagennisi Karditsa
- 1974–1975: Chalkida
- 1975–1976: AEK Athens U20
- 1976–1979: AEK Athens (assistant)
- 1977: AEK Athens (interim)
- 1979: AEK Athens
- 1979–1980: Atromitos
- 1980–1981: Egaleo
- 1981–1982: Diagoras
- 1982–1983: Egaleo
- 1983–1985: Atromitos
- 1985–1986: Acharnaikos
- 1986–1992: Greece U21
- * Club domestic league appearances and goals

Andreas Stamatiadis (Greek: Ανδρέας Σταματιάδης; 16 August 1935 – 23 January 2025) was a Greek professional footballer who played as a forward for AEK Athens and later a manager. He was the longest serving captain of the club from 1960 to 1969.

== Early life ==
Stamatiadis was born on 16 August 1935 in the refugee slum of Petralona. Born into a poor family, with an Asia Minor refugee father and mother from Mani, he experienced the German Occupation and its aftermath at a young age. Like many children of his generation, he found a way out of the problems of everyday life by playing football in the abundant playgrounds of his neighborhood.

== Club career ==
Stamatiadis started playing football in 1947 at AE Melandria. In 1950, at the age of 15, he signed a sport's card at Sparta Petralona, but a mistake in the signing of the card by the secretary of the club, essentially canceled his card. Then his father, Dimitris with the manager of Sparta Petralona and former player of AEK Athens, Mimis Seltsikas, took him for a trial to the academy of AEK at Nea Filadelfeia. Stamatiadis who was encouraged by his father and was a supporter of the yellow-blacks, eventually became a member of their academies.

The experienced manager of the men's team, Jack Beby, immediately recognized his potential and with appropriate advice and guidance helped his development and establishment as a left winger. There he flourished and at the peak of his career he earned the nickname "the Arrow" (Greek: "Το Βέλος"). Beby's successor, Mario Magnozzi, gave him the opportunity to play for the first time in 1952 in a derby against Olympiacos. Thus, Stamatiadis had the chance to compete in two matches alongside his childhood idol, Kleanthis Maropoulos, before the latter, retired as a footballer.

Stamatiadis was established as a regular in the offense of the yellow-blacks. He also became a regular in the selections of Athens XI during the 1950s. In 24 June 1956 he won his first title with the club after defeating Olympiacos 2–1 in the Cup final. In 1960 after the retirement of Giannis Kanakis, he took over the captaincy of the team and went eventually became the longest serving captain of AEK. Proof of his leadership skills was the respect he enjoyed from his teammates, as well as the trust shown in his person by the respective administrations and managers for his composure, equanimity and rationality. As a captain, he won 2 championships and the Greek Cup in 1966. On 3 December 1967 in a 4–1 away victory over Olympiacos, he attempted to "admonish" the younger Spyros Pomonis, in order to simplify his way of playing for AEK to reach an even wider dominance, instead of his insistence on repeatedly dribbling his personal opponent, Orestis Pavlidis. Nevertheless, Pomonis eventually insisted on humiliating his opponent and AEK missed the opportunity for a wider score against the red and whites, while Pavlidis took the decision to retire as a footballer and start a new career as a referee. He was one of the main players of the team that won second place in the Balkans Cup in 1967, losing only in the final by Fenerbahçe. In his last season with the club, they reached the quarter-finals of the European Cup. In 1969, in the context of a general renewal of the club's roster by the manager Branko Stanković, due to his intention to not compete for any other club, he decided to retire as a footballer at the age of 34. On 18 May 1969, he played for the last time in the 2–1 victory over Veria, where AEK won a penalty and was awarded to him by his teammates. Stamatiadis charged by the emotions of the moment, missed the chance to score his only penalty kick of his career with AEK, as his shot was saved by the opposing goalkeeper.

== International career ==
Stamatiadis had a total of eight appearances with Greece. He made his debut at the age of 19, on 8 March 1954 in a 2–0 away victory over Israel in the 1954 FIFA World Cup qualifiers. His last appearance was on 27 November 1963 against Cyprus in an away friendly match.

== Managerial career ==
The former manager of Stamatiadis at AEK, Jenő Csaknády, having recognized his abilities and high level of perception, encouraged him to get involved in coaching and helped him attend coaching schools and obtain a diploma. In the summer of 1969, shortly after his official retirement as a footballer, he followed the instructions of his former manager and traveled to Cologne, where he attended the local coaching school and became a manager himself. Upon his return to Greece it did not take long for Stamatiadis to begin his new career, as he was appointed manager at Rodos, where he spent one season. The following season, he became the manager of Trikala, where under his instructions they got the promotion to the first division. In the summer of 1971, Stamatiadis took charge at Lamia and he guided them to the semi-finals of the Cup, which is their best campaign in the tournament. In 1973 signed at Anagennisi Karditsa, where he spent a year before joining Chalkida.

On 19 June 1975 Stamatiadis returned to AEK Athens and took charge of the club's academies. On 19 July 1976 he was promoted as the assistant of František Fadrhonc. In his first season in his new position, AEK reached the semi-finals of the UEFA Cup. On 23 September 1977, when Fadrhonc was fired, Stamatiadis took charge in his place until a replacement was found, achieving 3 wins in the same number of matches. On 11 October, when Zlatko Čajkovski was appointed, he kept his position as the assistant manager. At the end of the season AEK won the domestic double. In the following season Stamatiadis continued working as assistant manager next to Ferenc Puskás. When the Hungarian manager was removed from the technical leadership of the club on 17 March 1979, he stepped again as the head coach until the end of the season with the task of keeping the team at the top of the standings. Stamatiadis succeeded in his task, winning the second championship in a row, while at the same time missed an opportunity for a repeat of the last season's domestic double, as they reached the Cup final, losing 3–1 to Panionios.

In the summer of 1979, after his tenure at AEK was over, Stamatiadis took over as the manager of Atromitos, where he won the league in the second division. In 1980 he was at the bench of Egaleo in the second division, helping them to avoid relegation. The following season, he claimed the promotion to the first division. Eventually he did not manage to secure in the end, as he was defeated by Rodos of Michalis Bellis in a draw, at the stadium of Heraklion, with 1–0 defeat at the extra time. In 1981 Stamatiadis was the manager of Diagoras for a year and in the summer of 1982 he returned to Egaleo. The club from the western suburbs won the last championship of the South and were promoted to the first division. In 1983 he returned to Atromitos for a season and then coached Acharnaikos.

In 1986, he was the manager of Greece U21 for six years. During his years they reached the final of the 1988 European U21 Championship, against France.

From 1992 on, he worked from time to time at the infrastructure departments of AEK, while for several years he was the director of these departments, a position from which he left in 2013, when he was replaced by Akis Zikos.

== After football ==
Stamatiadis continuously participated in the events of the Veterans Association of AEK Athens, where he also served as their president. He bequeathed his adoration for the club to his two sons, Dimitris and Kostas, who are actively involved with the amateur departments of AEK, serving the club in administrative positions. On 28 February 2024 at Agia Sophia Stadium, before the match of AEK against PAS Giannina, he was honoured with the "golden double-headed eagle" by Dimitris Melissanidis for his services to the club.

== Personal life and death ==
Stamatiadis was married and had two sons. He died after a series of health issues in Athens, on 23 January 2025, at the age of 89.

== Style of play ==
Stamatiadis was a fast and technically proficient winger, who operated mainly close to the touchline. He was capable of cutting inside and threatening the opposition goal with powerful shots. He was also a key provider of assists for AEK Athens, with many goals scored by the team's main strikers, which came from his passes. Furthermore Stamatiadis was described as a natural leader, was known for his composure and clear thinking in difficult situations. He inspired confidence in his teammates and earned the respect of his opponents. With strong awareness of the game, he was able to quickly identify mistakes and often guided his teammates on the pitch like a manager.

== Career statistics ==
=== Club ===
Appearances and goals by club, season and competition
Club	Season	League (Note: Also includes play-off matches.)			AFCA League (Note: Also includes play-off matches.)		Cup		Continental (Note: Also includes Balkans Cup.)		Total	
Club	Season	Division	Apps	Goals	Apps	Goals	Apps	Goals	Apps	Goals	Apps	Goals
AEK Athens	1951–52	Panhellenic Championship	0	0	2	1	1	0	0	0	3	1
AEK Athens	1952–53	Panhellenic Championship	0	0	5	2	4	0	0	0	9	2
AEK Athens	1953–54	Panhellenic Championship	9	5	10	2	2	0	0	0	21	7
AEK Athens	1954–55	Panhellenic Championship	0	0	13	2	2	1	0	0	15	3
AEK Athens	1955–56	Panhellenic Championship	0	0	16	3	5	1	0	0	21	4
AEK Athens	1956–57	Panhellenic Championship	0	0	14	2	6	9	0	0	20	11
AEK Athens	1957–58	Panhellenic Championship	20	5	14	10	5	6	0	0	39	21
AEK Athens	1958–59	Panhellenic Championship	18	6	14	5	4	1	0	0	36	12
AEK Athens	1959–60	Alpha Ethniki	29	10	—		7	4	0	0	36	14
AEK Athens	1960–61	Alpha Ethniki	29	9	—		8	9	4	0	41	18
AEK Athens	1961–62	Alpha Ethniki	24	11	—		0	0	0	0	24	11
AEK Athens	1962–63	Alpha Ethniki	22	4	—		3	1	0	0	25	5
AEK Athens	1963–64	Alpha Ethniki	29	1	—		4	1	1	0	34	2
AEK Athens	1964–65	Alpha Ethniki	28	4	—		3	0	2	0	33	4
AEK Athens	1965–66	Alpha Ethniki	28	6	—		3	0	0	0	31	6
AEK Athens	1966–67	Alpha Ethniki	24	2	—		2	0	9	0	35	2
AEK Athens	1967–68	Alpha Ethniki	33	13	—		4	0	4	1	41	14
AEK Athens	1968–69	Alpha Ethniki	23	2	—		0	0	5	1	28	3
Career total			316	78	88	27	63	33	25	2	492	140

=== International ===
Appearances and goals by national team and year
National team	Year	Apps	Goals
Greece	1954	2	0
Greece	1957	2	0
Greece	1960	2	0
Greece	1961	1	0
Greece	1963	1	0
Total		8	0

== Honours ==
=== Player ===
AEK Athens

- Alpha Ethniki: 1962–63, 1967–68
- Greek Cup: 1955–56, 1963–64, 1965–66

Individual

- Greek Cup top scorer: 1956–57

=== Manager ===
Trikala

- Beta Ethniki: 1970–71 (Group B)

AEK Athens

- Alpha Ethniki: 1978–79

Atromitos

- Beta Ethniki: 1979–80

Egaleo

- Beta Ethniki: 1982–83

Greece U21

- UEFA European Under-21 Championship runner-up: 1988

== See also ==
- List of one-club men in association football
