= Theofilos Vernezis =

Greek footballer

- Theofilos Vernezis

Personal information
- Date of birth: 1938
- Place of birth: Nea Filadelfeia, Athens, Greece
- Date of death: February 1998 (aged 59–60)
- Place of death: Athens, Greece
- Positions: Defender; goalkeeper

Youth career
- –1956: AEK Athens

Senior career*
Years	Team	Apps	(Gls)
1956−1966	AEK Athens	80	(0)
1966−1967	Panegialios		

International career
1955	Greece U19		
- * Club domestic league appearances and goals

Theofilos Vernezis (Greek: Θεόφιλος Βερνέζης; 1938 – February 1998) was a Greek footballer who played as a defender.

== Early life ==
From a young age, Vernezis excelled in the sporting activities he undertook. From the mid-1950s he played basketball at Ionikos Nea Filadelfeia, while he was also involved in athletics and played football at the academy of AEK Athens. He eventually chose football over the other sporting activities due to his affection for AEK.

== Club career ==
Vernezis was promoted to the senior team in 1956 under Kostas Negrepontis. He mainly played as a right or centre-back, but due to his physical attributes, while Tryfon Tzanetis also used him as a goalkeeper, replacing the injured Stelios Serafidis. Vernezis is considered the first outfield player in Greek football to play as a goalkeeper for an entire official match. In 1962, he played as goalkeeper in five league matches and one Cup match for AEK, as neither Serafidis nor Fakis were available. In the same position he had a notable performance in an international friendly against Bolton on 2 May 1962. During his spell at the club he won one championship in 1963 and two Cups.

In the summer of 1966 Vernezis continued his career at Panegialios, where he played for a season.

== Personal life ==
His father Vyronas was head of the EAM - ELAS organization in Nea Filadelfeia in 1944 and a Municipal Councillor of Nea Filadelfeia, in 1975, 1982 and 1986.Vernezis died in early February 1998.

== Honours ==
AEK Athens

- Alpha Ethniki: 1962–63
- Greek Cup: 1963–64, 1965–66
