= Giorgos Petridis =

Greek footballer and manager (1938–2017)

- Giorgos Petridis

Personal information
- Full name: Georgios Petridis
- Date of birth: 10 February 1938
- Place of birth: Ampelokipoi, Athens, Greece
- Date of death: 2 February 2017 (aged 78)
- Place of death: Athens, Greece
- Positions: Attacking midfielder; forward

Senior career*
Years	Team	Apps	(Gls)
–1957	AO Pera Club		
1957–1966	AEK Athens	145	(35)
1966–1969	Vyzas Megara		

International career
1963	Greece	1	(1)

Managerial career
- 1971–1972: Panarkadikos
- Eordaikos
- Levadiakos
- 1976: AEL
- 1987–1988: AEK Athens (assistant)
- * Club domestic league appearances and goals

Giorgos Petridis (Greek: Γιώργος Πετρίδης; 10 February 1938 – 2 February 2017) was a Greek professional footballer who played as an attacking midfielder and a later manager.

== Club career ==
Petridis started his career at AO Pera Club in the local divisions of Athens and with his impressive performances and his talent he attracted the interest of the big teams. In 1957, the doctor and vice-president of AEK Athens, Loutsidis, who knew him, mediated his transfer to the club, which took place under the presidency of Nikos Goumas. AEK gave some sports equipment to AO Pera Club, as exchange for his transfer.

Petridis found at AEK prominent teammates, such as Nestoridis, Poulis, Kanakis, Emmanouilidis who competed in his position. He made his debut replacing Kanakis who had come into conflict the manager, Vittore Martini. He impressed with his performances competing as an attacking midfielder, as well as an attacker. He scored a hat-trick on 16 December 1961 a 3–6 away win against Panelefsiniakos. On 23 December 1962 he impressed with his performance in the derby against Olympiacos at Karaiskakis Stadium where AEK won by 3–1. In that season AEK, coached by Jenő Csaknády and with the attacking duo of Nestoridis-Papaioannou, impressed and finally won the title after a play-off match against Panathinaikos. During his spell at AEK Athens, he won the Championship of 1963 and 2 Cups.

In the summer of 1966 Petridis left AEK and although he had a tempting offer to continue his career in Australia, he was influenced by his mother and decided to stay in Greece and eventually sign for Vyzas Megara. In the summer of 1969, after his release from the club, he returned to AEK Athens, but his transfer was canceled and he was eventually retired as a footballer and was appointed as a member of the managerial staff at the club's youth divisions.

== International career ==
Petridis appeared once with Greece in 1963. He did so on 16 October 1963 in a friendly home 3–1 win against Poland, under his former manager at AEK, Tryfon Tzanetis, coming in as replacement of Giannis Cholevas at the 46th minute and scoring the last goal of the match 20 minutes later.

== Managerial career ==
After the end of his career as a footballer Petridis became involved in coaching. He worked at Panarkadikos, Eordaikos, Levadiakos and AEL among others, while he was also assistant to Todor Veselinović at AEK. Later he was for a number of years in the training team of the academies of AEK.

== Personal life ==
Petridis was a good friend, best man and neighbor with the former player of AEK Athens, Kleanthis Maropoulos. He died on 2 February 2017, at the age of 78, in a car accident. Coincidentally, another former player of AEK Athens and his former teammate, Miltos Papapostolou also died on the same day.

== Honours ==
AEK Athens

- Alpha Ethniki: 1962–63
- Greek Cup: 1963–64, 1965–66
