= Nikos Melissis =

Greek footballer and a coach

Personal information
- Full name: Nikolaos Melissis
- Date of birth: 1936 (age 89–90)
- Place of birth: Kalogreza, Athens, Greece
- Positions: Center back; midfielder; striker

Youth career
- 1951–1953: PAO Kalogreza

Senior career*
Years	Team	Apps	(Gls)
1953–1961	AEK Athens	35	(1)
Total		35	(1)

International career
1956	Greece U19		
- Greece military

Managerial career
- 1960–1967: PAO Kalogreza
- * Club domestic league appearances and goals

Nikos Melissis (Greek: Νίκος Μελισσής; born 1936) is a former Greek footballer who played as a defender and a former manager.

== Club career ==
Melissis first played football in the plains of Perissos and the local PAO Kalogreza. In July 1953, he was transferred to AEK, through the stockbroker, Tranopoulos, receiving as a transfer premium the amount of 6,000 drachmas. He initially played as a center forward, but did not make many appearances. In 1956, the manager of the club at the time, Tryfon Tzanetis at some training tested Melissis as a defender, as he recognized his potential for this position and his high jump and he was justified since the latter played very well. In fact, the footballer himself considered that he might not have the best possible career if he continued playing as a striker, while he stated that he particularly liked the high game. He continued his career playing mainly in the defense, the midfield and wherever he was asked to. He was a member of the team that won the Cup in 1956, but did not play in final at the Leoforos Alexandras Stadium on 24 June against Olympiacos, where the yellow-blacks won by 2–1. But in a match against PAOK at Toumba Stadium, in his attempt to stop the ball with a projection to save the goal from PAOK's Kourikidis, he suffered a quadriceps tear. He never fully recovered from his injury. Furthermore, the acquisition of the striker turned defender, Giannis Marditsis from Egaleo in 1959 left no space for Melissis in the main squad. He left the club in 1961, managing to play 2 times in the first national division.

== International career ==
Melissis played some matches for Greece U19 in 1956 and he also was a part of the Greek military team.

== Managerial career ==
In 1960 Melissis started his career as a manager at PAO Kalogreza. He won the Athens FCA League in 1964 and the promotion to the second national division. He was in charge of the club until 1967, when the Junta merged the club with PAO Samfrapoli to create Ikaros Athens. Afterwards, he became the general leader of Ikaros.

== Personal life ==
He is the uncle of the later footballer Panagiotis Angelidis, who also played for AEK from 1982 to 1983. Melissis participates in the events of the Veterans Association of AEK Athens.

== Honours ==
=== As a player ===
AEK Athens

- Greek Cup: 1955–56

=== As a manager ===
PAO Kalogreza

- Athens FCA League: 1963–64
