= Giannis Kanakis =

Greek footballer (1927–2016)

- Giannis Kanakis with AEK Athens

Personal information
- Full name: Ioannis Kanakis
- Date of birth: 27 August 1927
- Place of birth: Kavala, Greece
- Date of death: 24 March 2016 (aged 88)
- Place of death: Athens, Greece
- Positions: Wide midfielder; full back

Senior career*
Years	Team	Apps	(Gls)
- Elpida Kavala
–1949	AE Kavala		
1949–1960	AEK Athens	51	(16)
Total		51	(16)

International career^{‡}
1951	Greece	1	(0)
1952	Greece military		(10)

Managerial career
- 1969–1970: Thiva
- 1971–1972: Aris Petroupolis
- * Club domestic league appearances and goals as of 8 April 2018 ‡ National team caps and goals as of 20 November 2002

Giannis Kanakis (Greek: Γιάννης Κανάκης; 27 August 1927 — 24 March 2016) was a Greek former professional footballer who played as a wide midfielder.

== Club career ==
=== Early years ===
Kanakis started football at Elpida Kavala and continued at AE Kavala, competing in the defensive line. In 1949, he was transferred to AEK Athens following the suggestion of the manager, Kostas Negrepontis.

=== AEK Athens ===
At AEK, he was relocated in the position of the wide midfielder. After the retirement of club's star player, Kleanthis Maropoulos and the departure of Poulis, Kanakis became the team's captain. He was one of the team's leading players in the first half of the 1950s and with the arrival of Kostas Nestoridis in 1955, they formed an amazing offensive duo. On 24 June 1956, he won the Cup with AEK, scoring the winner with a power shot in the final 2–1 against Olympiacos. On 25 October 1959, he scored in the 3rd minute in the away match against Ethnikos Piraeus and became the first player in the history of Greek football who scored in the newly formed first national division. He managed to compete in 6 times in that season's championship scoring 2 goals. In the second round match against Ethnikos Piraeus at the Nea Filadelfeia Stadium, he was honored for his presence, before retiring as a footballer, passing on the captainancy of the team to Andreas Stamatiadis. With AEK he won two Cups and one Athens FCA League in 1950.

== International career ==
Kanakis played for Greece once, in the away friendly 1–0 defeat against France B in Marseille on 14 October 1951.

He was also anointed an international with the Military team, scoring 10 goals, winning the World Military Cup in 1952 and scoring the winner against Belgium.

== Personal life ==
Kanakis he worked at the PPC alongside his football career. After his retirement as a footballer he remained close to AEK. On 9 June 1977, he was appointed as the team's curator, a position he held until 1979. He died on 24 March 2016, aged 88.

== Honours ==
AEK Athens

- Greek Cup: 1949–50, 1955–56
- Athens FCA League: 1950

Greece military

- World Military Cup: 1952
