= Antonis Dermatis =

Greek footballer

Personal information
- Full name: Antonios Dermatis
- Date of birth: 23 September 1936
- Place of birth: Piraeus, Greece
- Date of death: 26 May 2018 (aged 81)
- Position: Forward

Youth career
- 1950–1954: Afovos Neapolis Nikaias

Senior career*
Years	Team	Apps	(Gls)
1954–1956	Aris Nikaias		
1956–1965	Apollon Smyrnis		
1965–1966	Olympiacos		
1966–1968	Panegialios		

International career
1957–1960	Greece	7	(0)
- * Club domestic league appearances and goals

Antonis Dermatis (23 September 1936 – 26 May 2018) was a Greek footballer. He played in seven matches for the Greece national football team from 1957 to 1960.
