= Georgios Kamaras Stadium =

Building in Rizoupoli, Attica Region, Greece

- Rizoupoli
- Interactive map of Georgios Kamaras Stadium
- Former names: Rizoupoli Stadium
- Location: Rizoupoli, Athens, Greece
- Coordinates: 38°1′41.36″N 23°44′27.72″E
- Owner: GS Apollon Smyrnis
- Operator: Apollon Smyrnis
- Capacity: 14,200
- Surface: Artificial turf (since 2025)
- Scoreboard: Yes
- Public transit: Ano Patisia metro station

Construction
- Opened: 18 October 1948; 78 years ago
- Cost: €3,500,000 (2001 renovation)

Tenants
- Apollon Smyrnis (1948–present); Olympiacos (2002–2004); Ethnikos Piraeus (2005–2007); AEK Athens (2022); Greece national football team (2020, 2022) (2023-) training stadium

Georgios Kamaras Stadium (Greek: Στάδιο Γεώργιος Καμάρας) is a multi-purpose stadium in Athens, Greece. It is currently used mostly for football matches and is the home stadium of Apollon Smyrnis. The stadium holds 14,200 and was built in 1948. It was used by Olympiacos for about 2 years (2002–2004) as home ground, due to the construction of their new stadium Karaiskaki. Since 2005. the stadium is named Georgios Kamaras, in honour of Georgios Kamaras, old glorious player of Apollon.

== History ==
The stadium was built in 1948 and its inauguration took place on October 17 that year with the presence of some 10,000 fans. In 2002, Olympiacos undertook a radical renovation to use it as the temporary headquarters of its team until the construction of the new "Georgios Karaiskakis Stadium" was completed, replacing the old one in Neo Faliro, Piraeus. In 2003, Rizoupoli Stadium took its name in honor of former renowned footballer Apollon Smyrnis, Giorgos Kamaras. The stadium was one of the official training venues for the 2004 Olympic Games. In 2005 the stadium was used as the headquarters of the National Piraeus team.

The capacity of the stadium is 14,200 seats. The spectators' record was recorded in 1973 in a match between Apollon Smyrnis and PAS Giannina with 21,231 fans on the pitch.

On Summer of 2025, a new 8,500 square meter fully artificial turf has replaced the natural grass on the field, with full FIFA Quality Pro certification which allows the stadium to be used for Super League 1 matches. The cost was covered by a hefty 180,000 euros donation by the shipping company Delia Tankers LLC and the rest sum was paid in installments by GS Apollon Smyrnis, the owners of the stadium.
