= 1961–62 Alpha Ethniki =

26th season of top-tier football league in Greece

Alpha Ethniki
- Season: 1961–62
- Champions: Panathinaikos; 6th Greek title
- Relegated: Panelefsiniakos; Doxa Drama
- European Cup: Panathinaikos
- Cup Winners' Cup: Olympiacos
- Matches: 240
- Goals: 691 (2.88 per match)
- Top goalscorer: Kostas Nestoridis (29 goals)
- Biggest home win: AEK Athens 8–0 Egaleo
- Biggest away win: Ethnikos Piraeus 1–5 Panathinaikos; Panelefsiniakos 0–4 Olympiacos
- Highest scoring: AEK Athens 8–3 Panelefsiniakos

The 1961–62 Alpha Ethniki was the 26th season of the highest football league of Greece. The season began on 9 September 1961 and ended on 1 July 1962 with the play-off matches. Panathinaikos won their sixth Greek title and third consecutive.

The point system was: Win: 3 points - Draw: 2 points - Loss: 1 point.

== Teams ==
Promoted from 1961 Beta Ethniki	Relegated from 1960–61 Alpha Ethniki
Niki Volos; Egaleo; Panelefsiniakos	Panegialios; Thermaikos; Atromitos Piraeus

Location of teams in 1961–62 Alpha Ethniki

== League table ==
Pos	Team	Pld	W	D	L	GF	GA	GD	Pts	Qualification or relegation
1	Panathinaikos (C)	30	23	5	2	88	32	+56	81	Qualification for European Cup preliminary round
2	Olympiacos	30	22	4	4	65	23	+42	78	Qualification for Cup Winners' Cup preliminary round
3	Apollon Athens	30	19	6	5	55	26	+29	74	
4	AEK Athens	30	19	5	6	73	31	+42	73	
5	Panionios (Note: Apollon Kalamarias and Panionios were deducted 1 point each.)	30	12	8	10	43	40	+3	61	
6	PAOK	30	12	6	12	32	43	−11	60	
7	Ethnikos Piraeus	30	8	12	10	27	32	−5	58	
8	Iraklis	30	9	9	12	40	48	−8	57 (Note: 8th place play-off: Iraklis–Fostiras 3–0.)	
9	Fostiras	30	10	7	13	39	45	−6	57	
10	Proodeftiki	30	7	10	13	35	49	−14	54	
11	Niki Volos	30	5	12	13	35	54	−19	52 (Note: 11th place play-off: Niki Volos–Apollon Kalamarias 3–2, Apollon Kalamarias–Aris 4–2, Niki Volos–Aris 0–0, Niki Volos 5pts, Apollon Kalamarias 4pts, Aris 3pts.)	
12	Apollon Kalamarias	30	5	13	12	30	51	−21	52	
13	Aris	30	7	8	15	30	43	−13	52	
14	Egaleo	30	7	7	16	26	52	−26	51	
15	Panelefsiniakos (R)	30	3	13	14	36	67	−31	49 (Note: 15th place play-off: Panelefsiniakos–Doxa Drama 3–0.)	Relegation to Beta Ethniki
16	Doxa Drama (R)	30	5	9	16	38	56	−18	49	Relegation to Beta Ethniki

Source: RSSSF
Rules for classification: 1st points; 2nd decision match; 3rd head-to-head goal difference.
(C) Champions; (R) Relegated

== Results ==
Home \ Away	AEK	APA	APK	ARIS	DOX	EGA	ETH	FOS	IRA	NIK	OLY	PAO	PNE	PAN	PAOK	PRO
AEK Athens		0–1	5–0	1–0	3–1	8–0	2–0	3–1	2–0	2–0	0–0	1–4	8–3	4–1	6–2	1–1
Apollon Athens	2–0		3–2	3–1	8–1	3–0	2–0	2–0	2–1	1–1	1–2	0–0	1–0	2–0	2–0	2–1
Apollon Kalamarias	2–2	1–1		1–2	0–2	0–0	0–1	1–1	2–2	1–1	1–0	0–2 (Note: Apollon Kalamarias-Panathinaikos 1-1 when abandoned after 70 minutes, forfait 0-2.)	1–0	1–2	0–0	2–1
Aris	0–0	0–1	0–0		1–1	0–2	1–0	0–1	1–3	1–1	1–2	2–5	0–0	3–0	1–1	1–2
Doxa Drama	0–4	0–1	1–2	0–1		0–0	0–1	5–0	0–1	3–0	1–3	0–1	3–1	1–1	2–1	1–2
Egaleo	0–2	1–3	4–2	0–3	2–1		3–1	1–2	1–0	0–0	1–3	0–0	1–1	0–0	0–1	1–4
Ethnikos Piraeus	0–1	0–0	2–2	1–0	1–1	3–1		0–0	2–2	1–1	1–2	1–5	0–0	1–0	4–1	0–0
Fostiras	0–1	0–1	5–1	2–1	3–2	0–1	0–1		3–1	2–2	0–1	3–3	0–0	1–1	0–1	2–2
Iraklis	2–1	4–2	0–0	2–2	2–1	4–3	1–1	0–3		3–1	0–2	1–3	2–2	0–1	0–0	2–0
Niki Volos	2–1	1–0	2–2	1–2	2–2	2–1	0–3	3–2	2–2		1–2	0–1	3–2	2–2	1–2	1–1
Olympiacos	0–0	1–2	6–1	4–2	3–0	2–1	2–1	2–0	3–1	2–1		1–2	4–0	0–0	6–0	2–1
Panathinaikos	3–2	2–2	2–0	0–1	6–3	3–0	3–0	4–2	4–1	4–0	1–1		6–2	2–1	3–1	5–0
Panelefsiniakos	3–6	1–4	1–1	2–1	2–2	2–0	1–1	0–1	1–1	1–1	0–4	2–5		2–1	1–1	1–1
Panionios	0–1	3–2	2–2	4–0	1–1	1–0	0–0	3–4	2–1	3–1	2–1	1–3	3–1		0–2 (Note: Panionios-PAOK 0-1 abandoned at 89th minute, forfeit 0-2.)	2–0
PAOK	1–2	2–0	1–0	2–1	2–2	1–2	0–0	0–1	0–1	1–0	0–1	2–1	3–2	1–4		2–0
Proodeftiki	2–4	1–1	0–2	1–1	1–1	0–0	1–0	2–0	1–0	4–2	1–3	2–5	2–2	1–2	0–1	

Source: RSSSF
Legend: Blue = home team win; Yellow = draw; Red = away team win.

== Top scorers ==
Rank	Player	Club	Goals
1	(Greece) Kostas Nestoridis	AEK Athens	29
2	(Greece) Giorgos Sideris	Olympiacos	26
3	(Greece) Giorgos Kamaras	Apollon Athens	19
4	(Greece) Mimis Domazos	Panathinaikos	18
5	(Greece) Giannis Cholevas	Panathinaikos	15
6	(Greece) Giorgos Petridis	AEK Athens	13
6	(Greece) Kostas Toumpelis	Panathinaikos	13

== Attendances ==
Panathinaikos drew the highest average home attendance in the 1961–62 Alpha Ethniki.

#	Team	Average attendance
1	Panathinaikos	17,393
2	Olympiacos	14,585
3	AEK Athens	12,607
4	Ethnikos Piraeus	6,144
5	Fostiras	5,710
6	Apollon Athens	5,612
7	PAOK	5,608
8	Proodeftiki	5,070
9	Aris	4,047
10	Niki Volos	3,869
11	Panelefsiniakos	3,806
12	Iraklis	3,575
13	Panionios	3,566
14	Doxa Drama	2,942
15	Apollon Kalamarias	2,678
16	Egaleo	2,602
