= Mimis Anastasiadis =

Greek footballer

- Mimis Anastasiadis

Personal information
- Full name: Dimitrios Anastasiadis
- Date of birth: 26 October 1936
- Place of birth: Nea Ionia, Athens, Greece
- Date of death: 7 February 2002 (aged 65)
- Place of death: Athens, Greece
- Positions: Defender; striker

Youth career
- 1951–1954: A.O. Nea Ionia

Senior career*
Years	Team	Apps	(Gls)
1954–1956	A.O. Nea Ionia		
1956–1964	AEK Athens	91	(2)
Total		91	(2)

International career
1957–1961	Greece military		
1960	Greece	3	(0)
- * Club domestic league appearances and goals

Mimis Anastasiadis (Greek: Μίμης Αναστασιάδης; 26 October 1936 – 7 February 2002) was a Greek professional footballer who played as a defender.

== Club career ==
Anastasiadis started football in 1951 at his local club, A.O. Nea Ionia playing as a forward and soon attracted the interest of the big clubs. In the summer of 1956 attracted the interest of AEK Athens, Panathinaikos, Olympiacos and Apollon Athens. With the actions of their former footballer, Christos Ribas, AEK Athens managed to prevail in the battle of signing Anastasiadis, but with a 2-year ban to the player, due to the disagreement of A.O. Nea Ionia. The actions of the administration of AEK to reduce his punishment proved to be effective and his participation in the official matches of the club was allowed from the summer of 1957. During the period of his punishment, he competed with the team of Supreme School of Economics and Business, in which he was a student, in the Supreme Schools' championship. At the same time, he also coached the team of his neighborhood, PAO Safrabolis, which competed in the third division of Athens.

His inclusion in the squad also meant the change of position for Anastasiadis, as he was relocated from the offensive to the defensive line of the team by the then coach Tryfon Tzanetis, becoming a key member of the yellow-black defense for seven seasons. He scored his first goal with the club on 15 June 1958 against Panathinaikos forming the final 1–1 at the 70th minute. On 9 October 1960, he became the person of the match in the derby against Panathinaikos at the Leoforos Alexandras Stadium, as at the 88th minute of the match and while the score was at 2–2, Andreou made an obvious penalty by knocking down Kostas Nestoridis inside the area. The referee did not indicate the penalty and while all the AEK players were protesting him, Vangelis Panakis found the opportunity in the counterattack and with the defense of the yellow-blacks practically absent, scored making the score 3–2. Pandemonium ensued from the AEK players, especially Anastasiadis, who was shown the red card. Outraged, he stubbornly refused to leave the pitch, resulting in the interruption of the match at the expense of AEK and it awarded to the "greens" with a score of 2–0. On 19 March 1961 he scored his last goal, with a penalty at the 35th minute of the 2–4 away victory against Thermaikos, making it 0–2. With AEK he won a championship in 1963 and a Greek Cup in 1964. He left the club in the summer of 1964.

== International career ==
Anastasiadis played for the Greek military team, where he was also their captain.

Anastasiadis played with Greece 3 times. He made his debut on 3 July 1960 in the away friendly defeat by 7–2 against Denmark. on 20 December 1960 he also played in the defeat by West Germany with 0–3 at home for the qualifiers for the 1962 FIFA World Cup and on 11 December 1960 he played his last match in the away 0–0 draw against France B for the Mediterranean Cup.

== After football ==
After his retirement as a footballer, Anastasiadis worked as a coach. He attended international seminars and was one of the first unionized coaches. In the first years he was a technical guide at the second division side, Olympiacos Loutraki, while for the last 15 years he was the secretary of the Greek Coaches Association, with his old teammate at AEK, Miltos Papapostolou as president.

== Personal life ==
In his private life, alongside football, Anastasiadis was an economist as he graduated of the Supreme School of Economics and Business. One of the few players of his generation with a university education. He was also involved in his wife's art gallery. His daughter, Gianna is a journalist at ERT and the Cyprus Radio Foundation. Anastasiadis died on 7 February 2002, at the age of 65.

== Honours ==
AEK Athens

- Alpha Ethniki: 1962–63
- Greek Cup: 1963–64
