= Christos Ampos =

Greek footballer (1937–2020)

- Christos Ampos with AEK Athens

Personal information
- Full name: Christos Ampos
- Date of birth: 19 October 1937
- Place of birth: Mytilene, Greece
- Date of death: 1 July 2020 (aged 82)
- Place of death: Ilioupoli, Athens, Greece
- Height: 1.76 m (5 ft 9 in)
- Position: Forward

Youth career
- 1953–1955: A.O. Kifisia

Senior career*
| Years | Team | Apps | (Gls) |
| 1955–1962 | AEK Athens | 70 | (22) |
| 1962–1964 | Pan Hellenic | | |
| 1969 | Koropi | | |
| 1969 | Alexander the Great | | |
| Total | | 70 | (22) |

International career
| 1957 | Greece U19 | | |
| 1959 | Greece military | | |
- * Club domestic league appearances and goals

Christos Ampos (Greek: Χρήστος Άμπος; 19 October 1937 – 1 July 2020) was a Greek footballer who played as a forward.

== Club career ==
Ampos started playing football in 1953 at A.O. Kifisia, which were competing in the second division of the AFCA league. At the same time, he worked at a local textile factory and attended school. He mainly played as a left winger. He was fast with a powerful left shot, while he also scored with headers and power shots from a long distance. His playing style was characterized by stubbornness and combativeness.

In 1955 Ampos signed for AEK Athens. He continued to work at the factory and in order to be consistent with his football obligations, he saved money and bought a motorcycle to go from his job to Nea Filadelfeia for training. On 31 July 1960, he opened the score in the championship play-off against Panathinaikos where AEK were eventually lost 2–1 at Karaiskakis Stadium. He played for AEK until 1962 being one of their main players.

Afterwards, Ampos moved to Australia and joined the Greek-based club, Pan Hellenic until 1964. He later played for Alexander the Great until 1969, when he had a car accident that caused the loss of his leg essentially ending his football career.

== International career ==
Ampos also played with both Greek U19 and the military team.

== Personal life ==
For several years after his retirement Ampos was employed at the swimming pool of Glyfada. He died on 1 July 2020, at the age of 82.

== Honours ==
AEK Athens

- Greek Cup: 1955–56
