= Stelios Serafidis =

Greek footballer and manager (1935–2022)

- Stelios Serafidis in the early 1960s

Personal information
- Full name: Stylianos Serafidis
- Date of birth: 6 August 1935
- Place of birth: Gazi, Athens, Greece
- Date of death: 4 January 2022 (aged 86)
- Place of death: Athens, Greece
- Height: 1.77 m (5 ft 10 in)
- Position: Goalkeeper

Youth career
- 1948–1950: Proodeftiki Egaleo
- 1948–1950: Egaleo
- 1950–1951: Apollon Athens
- 1951–1953: AEK Athens

Senior career*
Years	Team	Apps	(Gls)
1953–1972	AEK Athens	244	(0)
Total		244	(0)

International career
1955	Greece U19		
1963–1968	Greece	1	(0)

Managerial career
- 1973–1995: AEK Athens (goalkeeping coach)
- 1973–1982: AEK Athens Academy
- 1983: AEK Athens (assistant)
- 1982–1984: Panelefsiniakos
- 1991–1992: Panelefsiniakos
- 1996–1997: AEK Athens Academy
- 2000–2001: Agioi Anargyroi
- 2012–2013: AEK Athens Academy (goalkeeping coach)
- * Club domestic league appearances and goals

Stelios Serafidis (Greek: Στέλιος Σεραφείδης; 6 August 1935 – 4 January 2022) was a Greek professional footballer who played as a goalkeeper for AEK Athens. Serafidis was among the most reliable and consistent goalkeepers in the history of the club. Gifted with agility and excellent reflexes, he was famous for his high diving saves under tough conditions. Despite his small stature, he managed to become one of their top players in the 1950s and 1960s and he is considered as one of the top Greek goalkeepers of the era. He later served the club in various coaching and managerial roles.

== Early life ==
Born on 6 August 1935 in Gazi, Athens, to refugee parents from Pontus and raised in Aigaleo, Serafidis had a particularly difficult childhood like most children of that time before, during and after World War II. Before playing football he did various small jobs to make a living. He worked as a water carrier, baker, porter, shoe polisher and peddler. In 1947, at the age of 11, he joined Proodeftiki Egaleo. The following year, he was invited to train with the senior team of Egaleo, then coached by Mimis Seltsikas. Seltsikas recognised his potential, worked with him individually and gradually promoted him to the club's third team. His older brother Lambis, who was an international striker at Apollon Athens, brought him to the club at the age of 14. He stayed there for a short period and then, at the age of 16, was transferred to the academies of AEK Athens, where he worked under Georgios Daispangos.

== Club career ==
After two years with the reserve team, followed by a year in the second team of AEK and from 1954 onwards, Serafidis became the club's first-choice goalkeeper. He was the main goalkeeper of AEK in the final of the Balkans Cup of 1967 against Fenerbahçe, where AEK Athens finished as runners-up. On 27 October 1968 in the derby at Karaiskakis Stadium against Olympiacos, at the 85th minute and while they were ahead by 3–2, Serafidis kicked the striker of the "red and whites", Giorgos Sideris, after the latter had previously kicked him in the knee while he was catching the ball from a cross. This action resulted in his dismissal and the manager, Branko Stanković did not proceed in a substitution, sending the forward and the club's star player, Mimis Papaioannou to replace Serafidis under the goalposts for the remaining 5 minutes. Papaioannou responded well in the position keeping the posts intact, even making two saves. He was part of the squad that reached the quarter-finals of the European Cup in 1969.

In September 1971 he was set to retire from active football after the matches against Internazionale for the European Cup and become the manager of the youth team. However, following the injury of first-choice goalkeeper, Stelios Konstantinidis in October, he returned to active duty just a few days later. Throughout his career Serafidis won three league titles and three Cups. He retired in the summer of 1972, at the age of 37.

== International career ==
Serafidis was a permanent member of the Greece national team, even though he had only one appearance in an official match in the 4–0 away defeat against Poland on 20 May 1963. He did not manage to make more appearances, because he was the back up choice to Theodoridis and Ikonomopoulos.

== Managerial career ==
After he retired, Serafidis went on to offer his services to AEK in various roles for a number of seasons. In 1973 he returned to the club as a goalkeeping coach of the first team for over 2 decades, as well as manager of their reserve and youth team whenever required. He worked for many years with the club's goalkeepers and later on he undertook similar duties for their academy. In 1983 he served as the assistant manager to John Barnwell.

== Personal life ==
Although he was in his eighties, Serafidis remained close to AEK in both home and away matches and he also served as president of the club's Veterans Association. His name is commemorated on one of the four pillars of the new stadium of AEK Athens, the Agia Sophia Stadium, alongside other important figures of the club's history such as Kostas Nestoridis, Mimis Papaioannou and Thomas Mavros. Furthermore, the name "Serafidion" was given to the training ground of AEK Athens in his honour.

Serafidis died after a long battle with cancer on 4 January 2022, at the age of 86.

== Career statistics ==
=== Club ===
Appearances and goals by club, season and competition
Club	Season	League (Note: Also includes play-off matches.)			AFCA League (Note: Also includes play-off matches.)		Cup		Continental (Note: Also includes Balkans Cup.)		Total	
Club	Season	Division	Apps	Goals	Apps	Goals	Apps	Goals	Apps	Goals	Apps	Goals
AEK Athens	1953–54	Panhellenic Championship	1	0	0	0	0	0	0	0	1	0
AEK Athens	1954–55	Panhellenic Championship	0	0	2	0	0	0	0	0	2	0
AEK Athens	1955–56	Panhellenic Championship	0	0	0	0	4	0	0	0	4	0
AEK Athens	1956–57	Panhellenic Championship	0	0	14	0	4	0	0	0	18	0
AEK Athens	1957–58	Panhellenic Championship	19	0	14	0	1	0	0	0	34	0
AEK Athens	1958–59	Panhellenic Championship	13	0	10	0	0	0	0	0	23	0
AEK Athens	1959–60	Alpha Ethniki	29	0	—		4	0	0	0	33	0
AEK Athens	1960–61	Alpha Ethniki	8	0	—		3	0	3	0	14	0
AEK Athens	1961–62	Alpha Ethniki	18	0	—		0	0	0	0	18	0
AEK Athens	1962–63	Alpha Ethniki	31	0	—		3	0	0	0	34	0
AEK Athens	1963–64	Alpha Ethniki	26	0	—		4	0	1	0	31	0
AEK Athens	1964–65	Alpha Ethniki	16	0	—		1	0	2	0	19	0
AEK Athens	1965–66	Alpha Ethniki	11	0	—		3	0	0	0	14	0
AEK Athens	1966–67	Alpha Ethniki	22	0	—		2	0	7	0	31	0
AEK Athens	1967–68	Alpha Ethniki	23	0	—		4	0	6	0	33	0
AEK Athens	1968–69	Alpha Ethniki	3	0	—		0	0	0	0	3	0
AEK Athens	1969–70	Alpha Ethniki	1	0	—		0	0	0	0	1	0
AEK Athens	1970–71	Alpha Ethniki	2	0	—		3	0	1	0	6	0
AEK Athens	1971–72	Alpha Ethniki	21	0	—		2	0	0	0	23	0
Career total			244	0	40	0	38	0	20	0	342	0

=== International ===
Appearances and goals by national team and year
National team	Year	Apps	Goals
Greece	1963	1	0
Total		1	0

== Honours ==
AEK Athens

- Alpha Ethniki: 1962–63, 1967–68, 1970–71
- Greek Cup: 1955–56, 1963–64, 1965–66

== See also ==
- List of one-club men in association football
