= Sotiris Fakis =

Greek footballer

- Sotiris Fakis

Personal information
- Full name: Sotiriοs Fakis
- Date of birth: 1934
- Place of birth: Athens, Greece
- Date of death: 29 October 1998 (aged 63–64)
- Place of death: Athens, Greece
- Position: Goalkeeper

Senior career*
Years	Team	Apps	(Gls)
–1957	Amyna Ampelokipoi		
1957–1962	AEK Athens	34	(0)
1962–1967	Egaleo		
- * Club domestic league appearances and goals

Sotiris Fakis (Greek: Σωτήρης Φακής; 1934 – 29 October 1998) was a Greek professional footballer who played as a goalkeeper.

== Club career ==
Fakis started his career at Amyna Ampelokipoi and in the summer of 1957 he was transferred to AEK Athens. He did not manage to establish himself under the goalpost of the club as their main goalkeeper, due the presence of Stelios Serafidis. During his spell with the yellow-blacks, he mostly played in friendly and Cup matches.

On 31 July 1960 he played in the championship play-off match against Panathinaikos at Karaiskakis Stadium, replacing Serafidis who was punished, where AEK lost by 2–1. He also played in the match of the inauguration of AEK Stadium on 3 January 1962 against Barcelona where AEK lost by 0–6.

On 31 July 1962, Fakis was transferred to Egaleo as part of the transfer of Manolis Kanellopoulos and Sofos Koulidis to AEK. There, he managed to establish himself as their main goalkeeper. He played at the club of Aigaleo for five seasons, until 1967 when he retired.

== Personal life ==
Fakis worked at first as a glass shop employee and later at the UN Environment Department in Athens. He died on 29 October 1998 at the age of 64.

== Honours ==
Egaleo

- Beta Ethniki: 1964–65
