= Stefanos Demiris =

Greek footballer and manager (1941–2016)

Personal information
- Full name: Stefanos Demiris
- Date of birth: 19 January 1941
- Place of birth: Kavala, Greece
- Date of death: 6 May 2016 (aged 75)
- Place of death: Greece
- Height: 1.78 m (5 ft 10 in)
- Positions: Forward; attacking midfielder

Youth career
- –1959: AE Kavala

Senior career*
Years	Team	Apps	(Gls)
1959–1964	AEK Athens	28	(8)
1962–1963	→ Panegialios (loan)		
1963–1964	→ Aris (loan)	24	(12)
1964–1969	Aris	99	(17)
Total		151	(37)

Managerial career
- 1971–1972: PAS Florina
- 1973: Edessaikos
- 1989–1990: Aiginiakos
- * Club domestic league appearances and goals

Stefanos Demiris (Greek: Στέφανος Δεμίρης; 19 January 1941 – 5 May 2016) was a Greek professional footballer who played as a forward and a later manager.

== Club career ==
Demiris began his career at AE Kavala and in the summer of 1959 he was transferred to AEK Athens. He played 2 and a half seasons with the yellow-blacks, playing as a back-up choice, due to the harsh competition in the team offense. In the winter of 1962, he was loaned to Panegialios, until the summer of 1963. In the following season he was loaned again, but this time to Aris. On 23 February 1964, Aris faced AEK in Thessaloniki and Demiris scored a brace against his former club and shaped the final 2–0 and match that was called by the press as "The revenge of Demiris". With his 12 goals he helped the team earn the ticket to the next season's Inter-Cities Fairs Cup for the first time in their history.

In the summer of 1964, his loan expired and Aris after a fundraiser by the associations of his supporters, raised the fee requested by the AEK for his acquisition. In the first round of the Inter-Cities Fairs Cup, Demiris played in both legs against Roma, where Aris were eliminated. On 18 October 1964, he was sent off in a match against Doxa Drama, when he clashed with an opponent. The HFF punished him with a one-month ban, but after his return he scored a hat-trick against Panionios in Nea Smyrni. He played in the European matches of the following seasons against FC Köln, where Aris achieved their first European victory, and in the home game against Juventus, where he had a shot hit the crossbar. He continued as an attacking midfielder, but various injuries limited him in the 1967–68 season, while the following year he was not a starter, competing in only four matches. In the summer of 1969 he participated in the team's preparation, but decided to retire from football at the age of 28.

== Managerial career ==
After the end of his career as a footballer, Demiris was involved in coaching mailny in Northern Greece taking charge of the benches of PAS Florina in 1971 for a season and Edessaikos in 1973. He was the manager credited with the promotion and the establishment of the then young Georgios Donis at the local Pavlos Melas in 1985. In 1989, he was the manager of Aiginiakos in the third division for as season.
