= Stavros Giafaloglou =

Greek footballer and manager (1932–2024)

Personal information
- Full name: Stavros Giafaloglou
- Date of birth: 15 October 1938
- Place of birth: Petralona, Athens, Greece
- Date of death: 17 July 2016 (aged 77)
- Place of death: Athens, Greece
- Position: Midfielder

Youth career
- 1952–1956: Akratitos Petralona

Senior career*
Years	Team	Apps	(Gls)
1956–1959	AEK Athens	7	(0)
1956–1957	AE Perikleous		
1959–1963	Egaleo	106	(15)
1963–1969	A.O. Petralona (player-manager)		

Managerial career
- 1969–1980: A.O. Petralona
- 1980–1981: Agios Ierotheos
- 1981–1982: Doxa Vyronas
- 1982–1983: A.O. Petralona
- 1983–1984: Athinais Kypseli
- 1984: Agios Ierotheos
- 1984–1990: A.O. Petralona
- * Club domestic league appearances and goals

Stavros Giafaloglou (Greek: Σταύρος Γιαφάλογλου; 15 October 1938 – 7 July 2016) was a Greek footballer who played as a midfielder and later a manager.

== Club career ==
Giafaloglou started playing football at Akratitos Petralona at the age of 14. In the summer of 1956 he was acquired by AEK, without the permission of Akratitos and was punished with a 2-year ban. In order not to remain competitive during the period of forced abstention from AEK, together with friends from his neighborhood, he created the independent club AE Perikleous, where he played until 1957, when a compromise was reached between Akratitos and AEK and thus his transfer was completed. He played in AEK for two years and in the summer of 1959 he was transferred to Egaleo, as part of the exchange for the transfer of Giannis Marditsis.

He played at Egaleo until the end of 1963 and was crowned champion of the second national division in 1961, making 62 appearances and 10 goals in the Alpha Ethniki. In the middle of the 1963–64 season, Giafaloglou left Egaleo and took over as player-manager at his neighborhood team, A.O. Petralona. He took them from the second local division and within 4 years brought them to the brink of playing in the second national division, winning three consecutive promotions and a AFCA championship. He continued to play until the 1969, where he retired as a player and remained only as a manager.

== Managerial career ==
Giafaloglou's spell an A.O. Petralona continued with another AFCA championship title in 1970, but did not manage to advance to the second national division. He eventually got the promotion to the second national division in 1972, through the play-offs. He kept his team in 1972–73 in the Beta Ethniki, but in 1974 Petralona finished 18th and were relegated to the local competition. In 1978, Giafaloglou won his 4th championship in the AFCA championship and promoted A.O. Petralona to the National Amateur Championship. This was followed by winning 2nd place in Group B and returning to the Beta Ethniki in 1979. He remained with the team in 1979–80, which performed satisfactorily playing at the Fostiras stadium, where they even scored some surprising victories and then Giafaloglou took over Agios Ierotheos, which he promoted to the National Amateur League in 1981, leading them to the National Amateur League. In 1981 worked at Doxa Vyronas for a season, which he also promoted to the National Amateur League. Then he returned at Petralona for another year, where he again won the title of one of the three groups of AFCA championship, but failed to advance to the play-offs with the two other champions. After a year at Athinais Kypseli he returned at Agios Ierotheos for a brief stint in 1984. From 1984 to 1990 he was again the manager of A.O. Petralona.

== Death ==
Giafaloglou died on 7 July 2016, at the age of 77.

== Honours ==
=== As a player ===
Egaleo

- Athens FCA Championship: 1959–60, 1960–61

A.O. Petralona

- AFCA championship: 1967 (Group A)
- 2nd Division of Athens: 1966
- 3rd Division of Athens: 1965

=== As a manager ===
A.O. Petralona

- AFCA championship: 1970, 1972 (Group A), 1978 (Group B), 1983

Agios Ierotheos

- AFCA championship: 1981
