= Giannis Marditsis =

Greek footballer and manager (1933–2010)

- Madritsis (right) with Pelé (center) and Nestoridis (left) in a friendly match between AEK and Santos

Personal information
- Full name: Ioannis Marditsis
- Date of birth: 19 February 1933
- Place of birth: Kleidi, Boeotia, Greece
- Date of death: 26 January 2010 (aged 76)
- Place of death: Papagou, Athens, Greece
- Height: 1.84 m (6 ft 0 in)
- Positions: Center back; striker

Youth career
- –1948: Artemis
- 1948–1949: Egaleo

Senior career*
Years	Team	Apps	(Gls)
1949–1959	Egaleo	105	(24)
1959–1964	AEK Athens	97	(0)
1964–1966	Korinthos	31	(12)
Total		233	(36)

International career
- Greece U19
1962–1964	Greece military	28	(0)
- * Club domestic league appearances and goals

Giannis Marditsis (Greek: Γιάννης Μαρδίτσης; 19 February 1933 – 26 January 2010) was a Greek professional footballer who played as a defender and later a manager.

== Early life ==
Marditsis was born on 13 February 1933 at Kleidi of Boeotia. His father, Zisis, was killed in 1940 while serving in the Greek military on the Albanian front, thus the 7-year-old Giannis, his mother Alexandra and his sisters Ourania and Konstantina were forced to move to Athens. They settled in Aigaleo and young Marditsis started playing the favorite sport of the children at the time, football.

== Club career ==
Marditsis started playing for Artemis and in 1948, at the age of 16 he was transferred to Egaleo and became a member of the second team. In 1949 he was promoted to the first team, which participated in the second division of championship of Athens, playing as a striker. With the establishment of the first national division in June 1959, the president of AEK Athens, Nikos Goumas, following the indication from the club's manager, Tryfon Tzanetis, gave the unreal for the time amount of 103,000 drachmas and five footballers to sign Marditsis, thus beating Panathinaikos, who were also interested in the player.

He made his debut with the yellow-blacks on 23 September 1959 in a Cup match against Proodos Patisia, where AEK won with 4–0. Due to his tall body structure for the time, he was used as a center back by Tzanetis on 13 December 1959 in an away match against PAOK, replacing the injured Nikos Melissis with AEK winning by 1–2. Since then, he was established in this position, creating alongside Miltos Papapostolou a formidable duo in the club's defense. On 7 March 1961, the administration of AEK imposed a one-year ban on him, because in the match against Panionios, he showed unsportsmanlike behavior towards his colleagues and the referee, but after two weeks they spared the rest of his penalty. He played with AEK for five seasons, winning the championship in 1963 and the Greek Cup in 1964. His last appearance with the AEK was on 18 September 1963 in the away 7–2 defeat against Monaco for the qualifying phase of the European Cup. After AEK he continued his career at Korinthos, playing in the second division, until the summer of 1966 when he retired as a footballer.

== International career ==
Marditsis was a key member of the Greek military team, with which he was capped 28 times and won the World Military Cup in 1962. He was also an international with the Greece U19.

== Managerial career ==
After the end of his career as a football player Marditsis became involved in coaching, managing clubs such as Charavgiakos and Almyros.

== Personal life ==
Marditsis was married since 1971 to his wife, Irene and together they had a daughter, Alexandra and a son, Nikos. Professionally, he worked as an aircraft engineer in the Air Force from where he retired in 1983. Ηe was also active in the field of tennis being one of the main contributors to the creation of the Papagou Tennis Club.

He faced problems of a cardiac nature and was hit intermittently by three strokes. The third proved to be fatal and Marditsis died on 26 January 2010, at the age of 76.

== Honours ==
Egaleo

- AFCA league: 1949–50, 1953–54

AEK Athens

- Alpha Ethniki: 1962–63
- Greek Cup: 1963–64

Greece military

- World Military Cup: 1962
