= Kostas Poulis =

Greek footballer

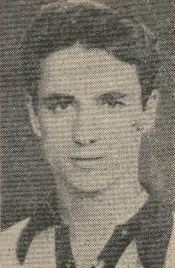

Personal information
- Full name: Konstantinos Poulis
- Date of birth: 28 October 1928
- Place of birth: Patisia, Athens, Greece
- Date of death: 7 December 1986 (aged 58)
- Position: Midfielder

Youth career
- 1943–1945: Treis Asteres
- 1945–1948: AEK Athens

Senior career*
Years	Team	Apps	(Gls)
1948–1959	AEK Athens	34	(1)
1959–1960	Propontis Chalkida		
1960–1961	Apollon Athens	1	(0)

International career
1950–1953	Greece	9	(0)
1952–1954	Greece military		(1)

Managerial career
- 1959–1960: Propontis Chalkida
- 1961–1966: AEK Athens Academy
- 1967–1969: Atromitos
- * Club domestic league appearances and goals

Kostas Poulis (Greek: Κώστας Πούλης; 28 October 1928 – 7 December 1986) was a Greek footballer who played as a midfielder. He competed in the men's tournament at the 1952 Summer Olympics.

== Club career ==
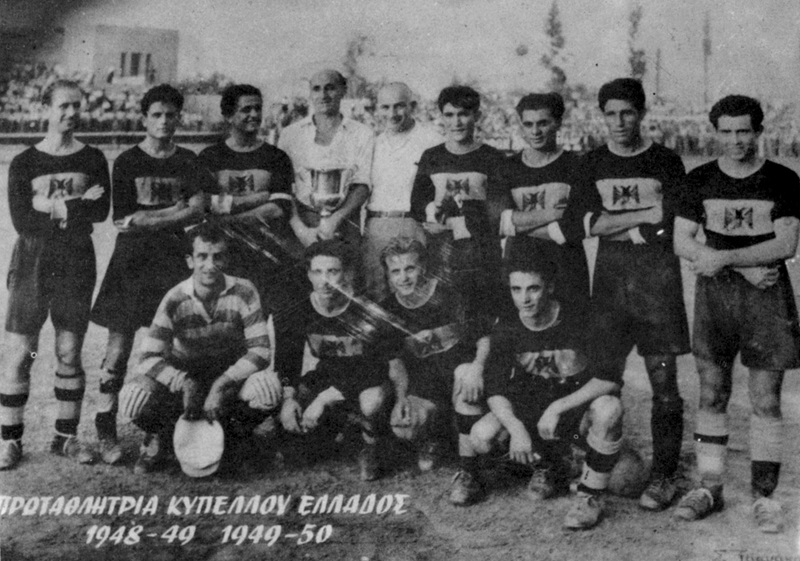
Poulis with AEK in 1950

Poulis started his football career in 1943, during the occupation of Greece, when he signed for a neighborhood club of his, Treis Asteres and competed in the pitches of the surrounding area. In 1945 after the end of the occupation, the academy manager of AEK Athens, Georgios Daispangos was looking for prominent footballers in ored to build a strong team similar to the one that dominated the last three years before the war. In a training session, he saw Poulis doing tricks with the ball and invited him to train with the club. The young player who was a supporter of AEK, due to his fathers refuge origin, he joined the academy departments of the club.

During his first years in the men's team he was a substitute, but in May 1948 the team played friendly matches at Thessaloniki and in the first game the team's left midfielder Isangeleas was injured. In the following match against Iraklis on 3 May, Poulis took his place and making his debut in a 3–0 win. From that day on Poulis was established as the left midfielder in the main squad. After the retirement of Kleanthis Maropoulos Poulis became the team's captain. During his 11-year spell at AEK, he won the 3 Cups as well as an Athens FCA Championship. In the summer of 1959 he was traded with his teammates Bounas, Temponeras, Valsamis and Kokkinidis to Propontis Chalkida in order for AEK to acquire the goalkeeper, Kimon Dimitriou. The following season he signed for Apollon Athens until 1961 when he ended his career.

== International career ==
Poulis played for Greece in 9 matches, between 1950 and 1953. He was also an international with the military team, with which he also scored a goal.

== Managerial career ==
During his spell at Chalkida he served also as manager of the club. After the end of his playing career he took charge of the youth team of AEK until 1966. From 1967 to 1969 he was the manager of Atromitos.

== Personal life ==
After the end of his career, Poulis was involved in coaching, at the same time he worked at the Water Company. In 1956 he played in the film "The aces of the pitch" (also known as "Sunday Heroes"), together with other important football players of the time, such as Andreas Mouratis, Lakis Petropoulos, Kostas Linoxilakis and Stathis Mantalozis. He died on 7 December 1986 of cancer at the age of 58. On 20 June 2022, his family donated to the then under-construction History museum of AEK Athens in the Agia Sophia Stadium, six medals from his sporting career, a tribute to his life and career since 1954, as well as a series of rare photographs.

== Honours ==
AEK Athens

- Greek Cup: 1948–49, 1949–50, 1955–56
- Athens FCA Championship: 1950
