= Giorgos Kamaras =

Greek footballer and manager (1929–2000)

Personal information
- Full name: Georgios Katrodavlis
- Date of birth: 5 May 1929
- Place of birth: Kato Patisia, Athens, Greece
- Date of death: 8 February 2000 (aged 70)
- Position: Striker

Youth career
- 1947: Chalkidonikos

Senior career*
Years	Team	Apps	(Gls)
1947–1963	Apollon Athens	61	(36)

International career
1954–1960	Greece	4	(1)

Managerial career
- 1974–1975: Apollon Athens
- * Club domestic league appearances and goals

Giorgos Kamaras born Georgios Katrodavlis (Greek: Γιώργος Καμάρας), 5 May 1929 - 2000 was a Greek footballer. His name has been joined with the history of Apollon Athens. The stadium of Apollon Athens, in the Athenian district of Rizoupoli, is named Giorgos Kamaras Stadium after him.

== Club career ==
Giorgos Kamaras was born in 1929 in Kato Patisia, but his origin was from Roumeli and the village of Mousounitsa. His younger brother was Aristidis Kamaras. He spent his childhood in Athens and grew up in the fields of Nea Filadelfeia. Before he turned 15, he made his first football steps with the team of Chalkidona. Later, having too much confidence in his abilities, he went to be tested at AEK Athens, but things did not turn out pleasantly for him. Despite the fact that his performance was excellent, the then manager of the club, Georgios Daispangos rejected him because of his height. His frustration was great, but even greater was his desire to prove his worth. So, a few months later he signed for Apollon Athens, where having manager Romylos Fronimidis, within a year, he managed to play in the men's team. "Kamaras" is a nickname that his teammates gave to Apollo a little later, due to his long pass that made an arch in its orbit.

The position in which he emerged was that of a striker and despite his lack of height he managed to make an impressive career. He made his debut as a key player in Apollon's squad on 25 March 1948 in a friendly match against Olympiacos at Georgios Karaiskakis Stadium. The game ended in a 0–0 draw and Kamaras was impressive. Since then, his place in the starting lineup was almost secured. This was followed by 16 consecutive years of service and presence in the team of the "Light Brigade" with which he associated his name. Throughout the 1950s and early 1960s, he was Apollon's greatest threat to the opposing defenses. Kamaras finished 2nd in the top scorers of the Greek championship in the 1959–60 season, the first of the Greek nationwide league, scoring 19 goals, while scoring the same number of goals in 26 games, he was 3rd for the 1961–62 season, leading Apollon to 3rd place, the club's best performance, so far in the Greek championship. He was also the top scorer in the Greek Cup in 1952.

== Style of play ==
The main feature of his game was the strong and sudden shots. He could "execute" from any position and distance, surprising the goalkeepers. His exceptional endurance and speed overshadowed the disadvantage of his height until the 1962–63 season when he retired from football which offered unique moments of spectacle. He ended his career at Apollon, at the age of 34 having 61 appearances and 36 goals in the Greek Championship.

== International career ==
Kamaras played for the Greece national team 4 times, scoring once on his debut on 8 March 1954 in a 0–2 win against Israel.

== Death ==
Kamaras was found dead at a shanty in Kifissia, on 8 February 2000 at the age of 68. He suffered by grief after the unexpected loss of his daughter from an incurable disease. The stadium at Rizoupoli, is called "Giorgos Kamaras" since 2005, in his honor.

== Honours ==
Individual

- Greek Cup top scorer: 1952

== See also ==
- Giorgos Kamaras Stadium
