= Petros Stamatelopoulos =

Greek footballer and manager (1934–2011)

- Petros Stamatelopoulos

Personal information
- Full name: Petros Stamatelopoulos
- Date of birth: 19 March 1934
- Place of birth: Nea Erythraia, Athens, Greece
- Date of death: 4 July 2011 (aged 77)
- Place of death: Nea Erythraia, Athens, Greece
- Position: Left back

Senior career*
| Years | Team | Apps | (Gls) |
| 1952–1959 | Panerythraikos | 111 | (4) |
| 1959–1963 | AEK Athens | 26 | (0) |
| 1963–1964 | Panachaiki | 19 | (0) |
| Total | | 156 | (4) |

Managerial career
- 1970–1972: Lavreotiki
- 1973–1974: Athinaikos
- 1975–1976: Ymittos
- 1976–1977: Afovos
- 1978–1979: Palliniakos
- 1980: Platonas
- 1980–1981: Elpidoforos
- 1983–1984: AO Anixi
- 1995–1996: Pallavreotiki
- * Club domestic league appearances and goals

Petros Stamatelopoulos (Greek: Πέτρος Σταματελόπουλος; 19 March 1934 – 4 July 2011) was a Greek professional footballer who played as a left back and a later manager.

== Club career ==
Stamatelopoulos started football in December 1952, at age 18, when he signed a sport's card at his local club, Panerythraikos. He made his unofficial debut on 3 January 1953 in a friendly match against Panetolikos in Agrinio, where he scored the second goal of the victory of his team by 0–3, even though was playing as a left back. A footballer with great talent, incredible strength and good technique, using both legs, he "held" the informal title of the "strongest wing-out execution" of the era. His contrast to the hard-nosed and unskilled full-backs of his era made him stand out technically on the pitch, evoking the admiration of the fans. In the summer of 1955, he signed a contract with Apollon Athens without the consent of Panerythraikos, resulting in the usual punishment of the time with a two-year ban. After the end of the season he came to an agreement with the management of Panerythraikos and returned to the team, playing with them until 1959. This period constituted the "golden era" of the club, which resulted in promotion for the first time to the second division of Athens. In 1957, Stamatelopoulos was serving in the Greek Navy and competed with the Navy team, winning the Armed Forces championship of that year, while in the same year he was also selected for Athens Mixed team, participating as the captain of the team on 26 May 1957 in the away match and the 0–2 victory against Levadia Mixed team. His performances attracted the interest of Panathinaikos and AEK Athens, while rekindling the old interest of Apollon Athens. In the effort of the three teams to sign him, Panathinaikos, the coach of the Navy team, I. Simos with as an ally and AEK the player's burning desire to play for the club from the birthplace of his Constantinopolitan father. The manager of AEK, Lukas Aurednik, realizing his value and immediately advocated for his transfer and thus Stamatelopoulos signed with the yellow-blacks on 3 August 1959 for 100,000 drachmas and the five players of reserve team to Panerythraikos.

He made his debut with AEK on 2 September 1959 in a 7–0 friendly win against Eleftheroupoli, coming in as a replacement for Thanasis Tsangaris. Stamatelopoulos also competed in a number of international friendlies against Partizan, Flamengo and Santos, as well as in the matches in Cyprus against Apollon Limassol, Anorthosis Famagusta and Omonia in May 1962. On 28 July 1961, in the friendly match against Santos, he played the entire game and amazed with his performance by "locking" the international Brazilian left winger Pepe. In his 4-year spell with AEK, he won a Championship in 1963.

In August 1963, he transferred to Panachaiki, where he played for one season in the second division, finishing first in their respective group.

== Managerial career ==
After the end of his career as a football player, Stamatelopoulos was involved in coaching, working in teams of minor categories. In 1970, he took over Lavreotiki, where he stayed for 2 seasons. In 1973, he was on the bench of Athinaikos until 1974. The following year he coached Ymittos for a season and then Afovos for another one. In 1978, he took over Palliniakos for a season and after a brief spell at Platonas in 1980, he Elpidoforos until 1981. In 1983, he managed AO Anixi until 1984 and in 1995 he managed Pallavreotiki, which was the last stop of his career, leaving in 1996.

== Personal life ==
His father, Giorgos, was from Constantinople. Stamatelopoulos had a wife named Marina and two daughters, Margarita and Katerina. He died of illness on 4 July 2011 at the age of 77.

== Honours ==
AEK Athens

- Alpha Ethniki: 1962–63

Panachaiki

- Beta Ethniki: 1963–64 (Group A)
