= 1955–56 Greek Football Cup =

1955–56 Greek Cup
Tournament details
- Country: Greece

Final positions
- Champions: AEK Athens (5th title)
- Runners-up: Olympiacos

The 1955–56 Greek Football Cup was the 14th edition of the Greek Football Cup. The competition culminated with the Greek Cup final, held at Leoforos Alexandras Stadium, Athens on 24 June 1956. The match was contested by AEK Athens and Olympiacos, with AEK Athens winning by 2–1.

== Calendar ==
From Round of 32 onwards:

Round	Date(s)	Fixtures	Clubs	New entries
Round of 32	5, 28 February, 1 April 1956	18	32 → 16	none
Round of 16	22 April 1956	8	16 → 8	none
Quarter-finals	20 May 1956	5	8 → 4	none
Semi-finals	13 June 1956	2	4 → 2	none
Final	24 June 1956	1	2 → 1	none

== Knockout phase ==
In the knockout phase, teams play against each other over a single match. If the match ends up as a draw, extra time will be played and if the match remains a draw a replay match is set at the home of the guest team which the extra time rule stands as well. If a winner doesn't occur after the replay match the winner emerges by a flip of a coin.

== Bracket ==
Round of 32
Achilleas Korinthos	2
AEK Athens	8
Averoff Ioannina	2
Panetolikos	1
Panionios	8
Atromitos Piraeus	2
Doxa Drama	3
Makedonikos	2
Panathinaikos	2
Ampelokipoi	0
Thyella Patras	3
Athinaikos	2
Apollon Athens	5
Panelefsiniakos	2
OFI	3
Ergotelis	0
Aris	2
Ethnikos Edessa	0
Iraklis Kavala	1	2
Apollon Kalamarias	1	3
Iraklis (w/o)	1	2
Elpida Drama	1	0
PAOK	3
Olympiacos Kozani	0
Fostiras	0
Olympiacos	1
Doxa Larissa	0
Pallevadiaki	1
Niki Volos (a.e.t.)	3
Olympiacos Volos	2
Ethnikos Piraeus	1
Egaleo	0

Round of 16
AEK Athens	4
Averoff Ioannina	1
Panionios	3
Doxa Drama	1
Panathinaikos	8
Thyella Patras	0
Apollon Athens	2
OFI	1
Aris	1
Apollon Kalamarias	0
Iraklis	3
PAOK	2
Olympiacos	7
Pallevadiaki	0
Niki Volos	5
Ethnikos Piraeus	0

Quarter-finals
AEK Athens	2
Panionios	1
Panathinaikos	1
Apollon Athens	0
Aris	1	2
Iraklis	1	1
Olympiacos	4
Niki Volos	0

Semi-finals
AEK Athens	2
Panathinaikos	1
Aris	0
Olympiacos	3

Final
AEK Athens	2
Olympiacos	1

== Round of 32 ==
Team 1	Score/Agg.	Team 2	Match	Replay
Thyella Patras	3–2	Athinaikos		
Niki Volos	3–2 (a.e.t.)	Olympiacos Volos		
Iraklis	3–1	Elpida Drama	1–1 (a.e.t.)	2–0 (w/o)
Iraklis Kavala	3–4	Apollon Kalamarias	1–1 (a.e.t.)	2–3
Fostiras	0–1	Olympiacos		
Achilleas Korinthos	2–8	AEK Athens		
Aris	2–0	Ethnikos Edessa		
PAOK	3–0	Olympiacos Kozani		
Doxa Drama	3–2	Makedonikos		
Doxa Larissa	0–1	Pallevadiaki		
Ethnikos Piraeus	1–0	Egaleo		
OFI	3–0	Ergotelis		
Averoff Ioannina	2–1	Panetolikos		
Panionios	8–2	Atromitos Piraeus		
Panathinaikos	2–0	Ampelokipoi		
Apollon Athens	5–2	Panelefsiniakos		

== Round of 16 ==
Team 1	Score	Team 2
Olympiacos	7–0	Pallevadiaki
Niki Volos	5–0	Ethnikos Piraeus
Panathinaikos	8–0	Thyella Patras
Apollon Athens	2–1	OFI
AEK Athens	4–1	Averoff Ioannina
Panionios	3–1	Doxa Drama
Aris	1–0	Apollon Kalamarias
Iraklis	3–2	PAOK

== Quarter-finals ==
Team 1	Score/Agg.	Team 2	Match	Replay
Olympiacos	4–0	Niki Volos		
Panathinaikos	1–0	Apollon Athens		
AEK Athens	2–1	Panionios		
Aris	3–2	Iraklis	1–1 (a.e.t.)	2–1

== Semi-finals ==
Team 1	Score	Team 2
Aris	0–3	Olympiacos
AEK Athens	2–1	Panathinaikos

== Final ==
24 June 1956

AEK Athens	2–1	Olympiacos
Chaniotis 22'; Kanakis 67'	Report	Darivas 26'

Leoforos Alexandras Stadium, Ampelokipoi
Attendance: 25,000
Referee: Gino Rigato (Italy)
