= Miltos Papapostolou =

Greek footballer and manager (1935–2017)

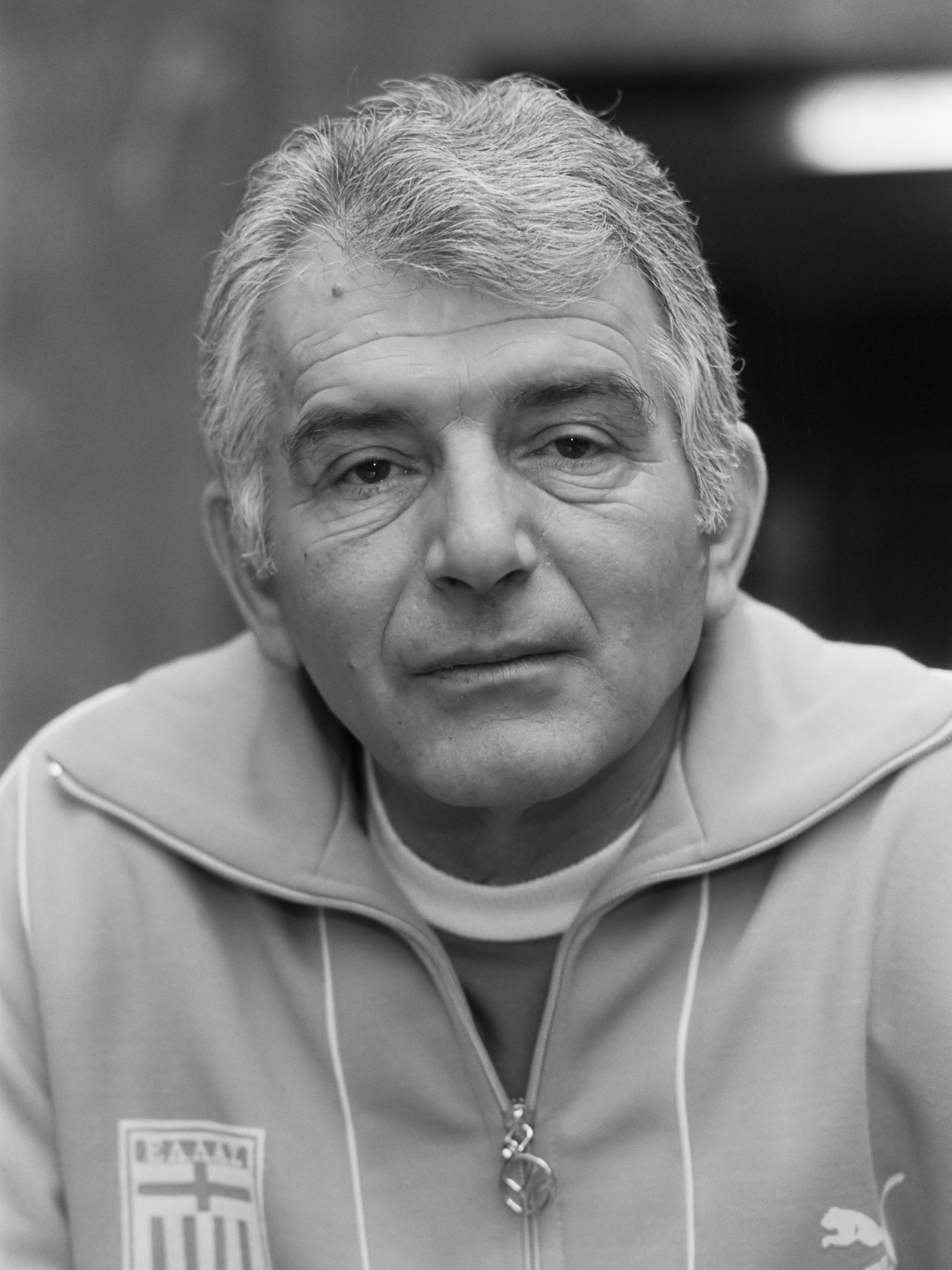
- Miltos Papapostolou (1987)

Personal information
- Full name: Miltiadis Papapostolou
- Date of birth: 9 September 1935
- Place of birth: Omvriaki, Domokos, Greece
- Date of death: 2 February 2017 (aged 81)
- Height: 1.78 m (5 ft 10 in)
- Positions: Defensive midfielder; center back

Youth career
- 1951: AS Omvros Omvriakis

Senior career*
| Years | Team | Apps | (Gls) |
| 1951–1956 | Egaleo | | |
| 1956–1966 | AEK Athens | 148 | (2) |

Managerial career
- 1966–1967: Marko
- 1967–1968: Ierapoli
- 1968–1970: Korinthos
- 1970–1971: Acharnaikos
- 1972–1973: Korinthos
- 1973–1974: Egaleo
- 1974–1976: Egaleo
- 1977: Koropi
- 1977–1978: Panelefsiniakos
- 1979: Kallithea
- 1980–1981: AEK Athens
- 1984–1988: Greece
- 1989: Olympiacos
- 1990–1991: Levadiakos
- 1992: Athinaikos
- 1993: Proodeftiki
- * Club domestic league appearances and goals

Miltos Papapostolou (Greek: Μίλτος Παπαποστόλου; 9 September 1935 – 2 February 2017) was a Greek professional footballer and manager.

== Club career ==
Papapostolou started his career at Omvros Omvriakis. In 1951 he joined Egaleo, where he played there for 5 seasons. In 1956 Papapostolou signed for AEK Athens, but without the approval of Egaleo and thus he was punished with a two-year ban from football, as it was applied at the time.

Upon his return in 1958, Papapostolou became a key player of the squad. In 1963 he played a decisive role in the conquest of the championship, while he also won the Cup in the following season. In 1966 Papapostolou left AEK, when he also decided to retire as a footballer, at the age of 31.

== Managerial career ==
Papapostolou started his managerial career at Marko, where he won promotion to the first division of AFCA league. Then, he worked at Ierapoli and on 26 July 1968, he became the manager of Korinthos. In his first season at the club, they managed to finish above the relegation zone of Beta Ethniki and in his second season they barely lost the promotion, finishing second behind Apollon Athens. On 21 July 1970 he was hired at Acharnaikos, who competed in the second division for the first time in their history and finished at the 4th place. He later returned to Korinthos, where they finished at the 4th place, as well. In 1973 he worked at the bench of Egaleo until 1976 with a break of a 1 and a half month in November 1974. In 1977 he became the manager of Koropi for a few months and later he worked at Panelefsiniakos for a season. In the summer of 1979 he worked at Kallithea until December of the same year, when he returned to AEK as a part of their technical staff.

In March 1980 he replaced the manager of the club, Hermann Stessl. AEK finished at the 4th place and were left out of the European competitions of the next season. In the following season, the president Loukas Barlos, renewed his contract. AEK finished second behind Olympiacos and in the Cup he reached the semi-finals where they were eliminated by PAOK. In June, the club changed ownership, with Andreas Zafiropoulos becoming the new president. Zafiropoulos decided in appointing Hans Tilkowski as manager, marking the end of Papapostolou at the bench of the club.

After a spell at Kallithea, he took charge of the bench of Greece from 1984 to 1988. In 1989 he had a 3-month spell at Olympiacos. The following season he signed for Levadiakos until 1991. In February 1992, Papapostolou took charge of Athinaikos, where he stayed until the end of the season. In February 1993 he sat at the bench of Proodeftiki for a short period.

== After football ==
Papapostolou was for a number of years the president of the Greek Football Coaches Association, with important reforms for the industry. He died on 2 February 2017, at the age of 81.

== Honours ==
=== As a player ===
AEK Athens

- Alpha Ethniki: 1962–63
- Greek Cup: 1963–64, 1965–66
