= 1952 Greek Football Cup final =

1952 Greek Cup final
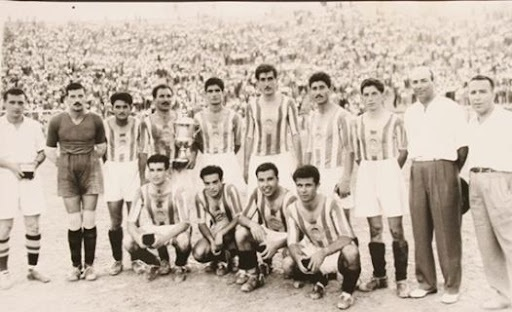
- Olympiacos with the Cup
- Event: 1951–52 Greek Football Cup
Olympiacos	Panionios
- Olympiacos won after a replay
Olympiacos	Panionios
2	2
- After extra time
- Date: 5 June 1952
- Venue: Leoforos Alexandras Stadium, Ampelokipoi, Athens
- Referee: Sotiris Asprogerakas (Athens)
- Attendance: 15,000

Replay
Panionios	Olympiacos
0	2
- Date: 15 June 1952
- Venue: Leoforos Alexandras Stadium, Ampelokipoi, Athens
- Referee: Konstantinos Gikopoulos (Thessaloniki)
- Attendance: 15,000

The 1952 Greek Cup final was the 10th final of the Greek Cup. The initial match took place on 1 June 1952 and the replay match took place on 15 June 1952 at Leoforos Alexandras Stadium. The contesting teams were Olympiacos and Panionios. It was Olympiacos' third Greek Cup final and second consecutive in their 27 years of existence and Panionios' first ever Greek Cup final in their 62-year history.

== Venue ==
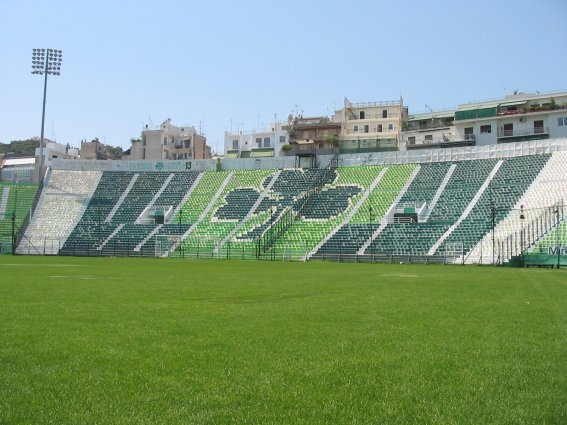
Leoforos Alexandras Stadium.

This was the ninth Greek Cup final held at Leoforos Alexandras Stadium, after the 1932, 1939, 1940, 1947, 1948, 1949, 1950 and 1951 finals. (Leoforos also hosted the replay match of the 1933 final between Ethnikos Piraeus and Aris and the replay match of the 1949 final between AEK Athens and Panathinaikos).

Leoforos Alexandras Stadium was built in 1922. The stadium is used as a venue for Panathinaikos and Greece. Its current capacity is 30,000.

== Background ==
Olympiacos had reached the Greek Cup final two times, winning all of them. The last time that they played in a final was in 1951, where they had won PAOK by 2–0.

Panionios had never competed in a Cup final.

The two teams had never met each other in a Cup final.

== Route to the final ==
Olympiacos				Round	Panionios			
Opponent	Agg.	1st leg	2nd leg		Opponent	Agg.	1st leg	2nd leg
Apollon Kalamata	7–0 (A)			Round of 16	Apollon Athens	2–1 (A)		
Pagasatikos Volos	3–1 (A)			Quarter-finals	Ethnikos Piraeus	5–4	2–2 (a.e.t.) (A)	3–2 (H)
AEK Athens	2–0 (A)			Semi-finals	Doxa Drama	4–3	2–2 (a.e.t.) (A)	2–1 (H)

== Match ==
=== Details ===
1 June 1952
17:00 EET

Olympiacos	2–2 (a.e.t.)	Panionios
Kopanidis 30'; Drosos 90'	Report (page 1)	Tsolias 34', 60'

Leoforos Alexandras Stadium, Ampelokipoi
Referee: Sotiris Asprogerakas (Athens)

GK	(Greece) Stelios Kourouklatos
DF	(Greece) Ilias Rosidis
DF	(Greece) Andreas Mouratis (c)
MF	(Greece) Vasilis Xanthopoulos
MF	(Greece) Thanasis Bebis
MF	(Greece) Babis Kotridis
FW	(Greece) Giorgos Kansos
FW	(Greece) Georgios Darivas
FW	(Greece) Giorgos Kopanidis
FW	(Greece) Stelios Christopoulos
FW	(Greece) Babis Drosos
Manager:
(Greece) Giannis Chelmis, (Greece) Vangelis Chelmis

GK	(Greece) Nikos Pentzaropoulos
DF	(Greece) Nontas Kasapoglou
DF	(Greece) Giannis Kerdemelidis
DF	(Greece) Iakovos Zarkadis
MF	(Greece) Pavlidis
MF	(Greece) Vasilis Staikos
FW	(Greece) Ioannis Skordilis
FW	(Greece) Kostas Nestoridis
FW	(Greece) Fotis Tsolias
FW	(Greece) Nikos Zarkadis
FW	(Greece) Kostas Sotiriadis
Manager:
(Greece) Kostas Negrepontis

Assistant referees:
Giannis Daskalakis (Piraeus)
Koskinas

Match rules

- 90 minutes
- 30 minutes of extra time if necessary
- Replay match if scores still level

== Replay ==
=== Details ===
15 June 1952
17:30 EET

Olympiacos	2–0	Panionios
Darivas 5'; Kansos 68'	Report (pages 1,2)

Leoforos Alexandras Stadium, Ampelokipoi
Attendance: 15,000
Referee: Konstantinos Gikopoulos (Thessaloniki)

GK	(Greece) Stelios Kourouklatos
DF	(Greece) Ilias Rosidis
DF	(Greece) Makis Germenis
MF	(Greece) Vasilis Xanthopoulos
MF	(Greece) Babis Kotridis
MF	(Greece) Andreas Mouratis (c)
FW	(Greece) Giorgos Kansos
FW	(Greece) Georgios Darivas
FW	(Greece) Stelios Christopoulos
FW	(Greece) Thanasis Bebis
FW	(Greece) Babis Drosos
Manager:
(Greece) Giannis Chelmis, (Greece) Vangelis Chelmis

GK	(Greece) Nikos Pentzaropoulos
DF	(Greece) Nontas Kasapoglou
DF	(Greece) Giannis Kerdemelidis
DF	(Greece) Iakovos Zarkadis
MF	(Greece) Pavlidis
MF	(Greece) Vasilis Staikos
FW	(Greece) Ioannis Skordilis
FW	(Greece) Kostas Nestoridis
FW	(Greece) Fotis Tsolias
FW	(Greece) Nikos Zarkadis
FW	(Greece) Kostas Sotiriadis
Manager:
(Greece) Kostas Negrepontis

Assistant referees:
Tsabasis (Piraeus)
Koutsomichos

Match rules

- 90 minutes
- 30 minutes of extra time if necessary
- Coin toss if scores still level

== See also ==
- 1951–52 Greek Football Cup
