= Olympiacos–PAOK rivalry =

Rivalry between Greek association football clubs

Olympiacos and PAOK rivalry
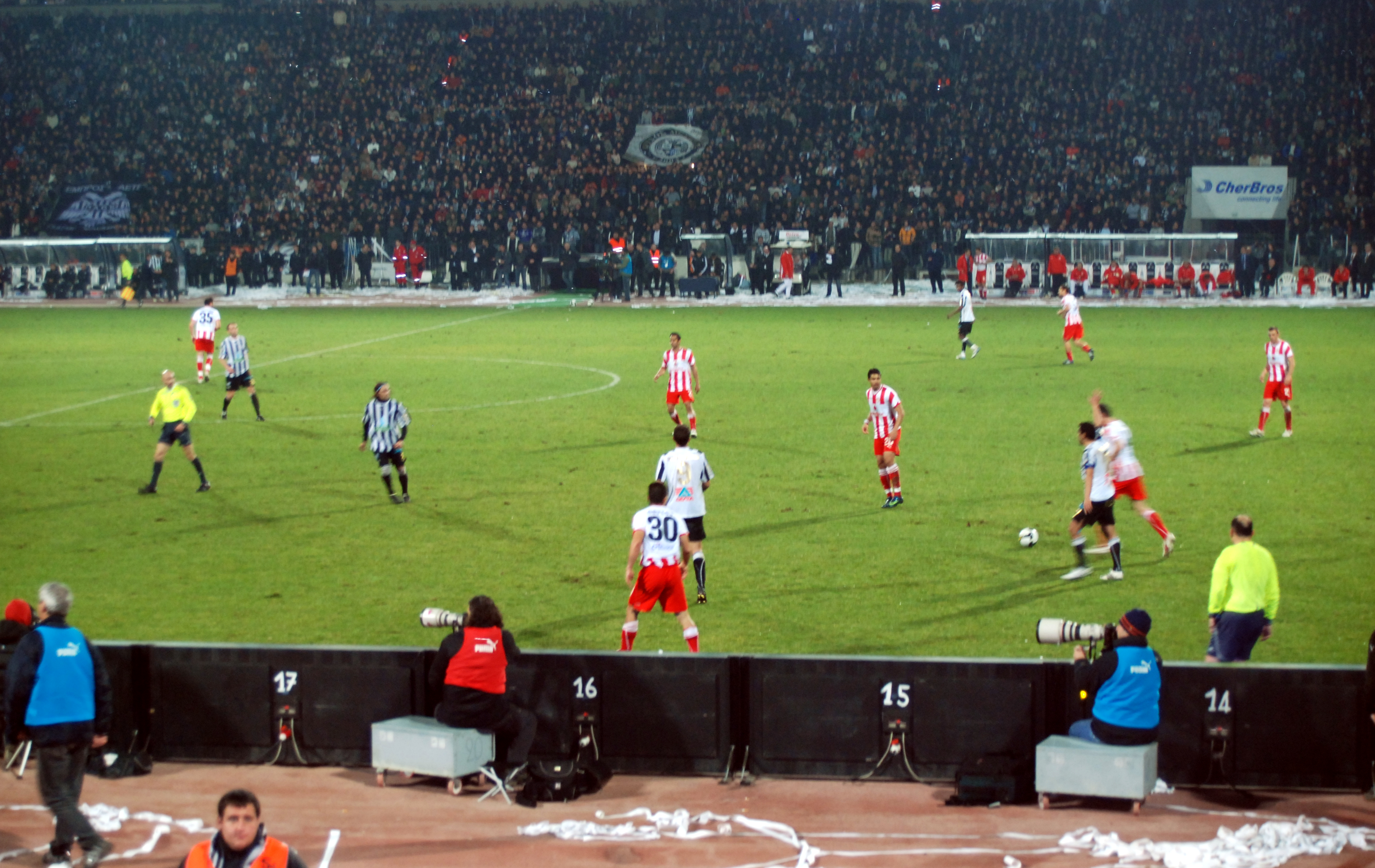
- PAOK vs Olympiacos (1–0) at Toumba Stadium during a Greek Cup match in February 2009.
- Location: Piraeus – Thessaloniki, Greece
- Teams: Olympiacos; PAOK
- First meeting: 1 February 1931; Panhellenic Championship; Olympiacos 3–1 PAOK
- Latest meeting: 8 November 2026; Super League Greece; Olympiacos 1–1 PAOK
- Next meeting: TBD
- Stadiums: Karaiskakis Stadium (Olympiacos); Toumba Stadium (PAOK)

Statistics
- Total meetings: 209
- Most wins: Olympiacos (103)
- Most player appearances: Giorgos Koudas (PAOK) (40)
- Top scorer: Giorgos Sideris (Olympiacos) (12 goals)
- All-time series: Olympiacos: 103; Drawn: 40; PAOK: 66
- Largest victory: 3 June 1962; Alpha Ethniki; Olympiacos 6–0 PAOK
- Longest win streak: 10 games Olympiacos (1936–1955)
- Longest unbeaten streak: 14 games Olympiacos (1935–1957)
- Current unbeaten streak: 6 games PAOK (2025–present)

The football rivalry between Olympiacos and PAOK is widely regarded as the most intense intercity rivalry in Greek football. The competitive, often hostile, history between Olympiacos and PAOK has frequently resulted in high-tension fixtures. Olympiacos play their home games at the Georgios Karaiskakis Stadium in Piraeus, while PAOK are based at the Toumba Stadium in Thessaloniki.

== History ==
=== Cultural rivalry ===
Thessalonians frequently express a sentiment of systemic marginalization, perceiving a state-sanctioned bias that favors Athens and Piraeus over their own city. Supporters of Thessalonian sports clubs often attribute the systemic disadvantage of their teams to the dominance of the capital-based P.O.K. coalition (Panathinaikos, Olympiacos, AEK Athens), viewing it as an entrenched, systemic inequality.

=== Football rivalry ===
The two clubs are both widely supported in Greece. Olympiacos is the most successful club in Greek football and is generally considered to have the largest overall following nationwide, while PAOK is recognized as the most dominant club in Northern Greece, boasting a massive, dedicated fanbase, particularly in the Macedonia region and Thessaloniki. Their rivalry is among the most intense in the country, representing a strong North-South divide and it was intensified during the 1960s, triggered by Olympiacos' attempt to sign PAOK’s legendary playmaker, Giorgos Koudas, while bypassing formal negotiations with the Thessaloniki-based club.

== Statistics ==
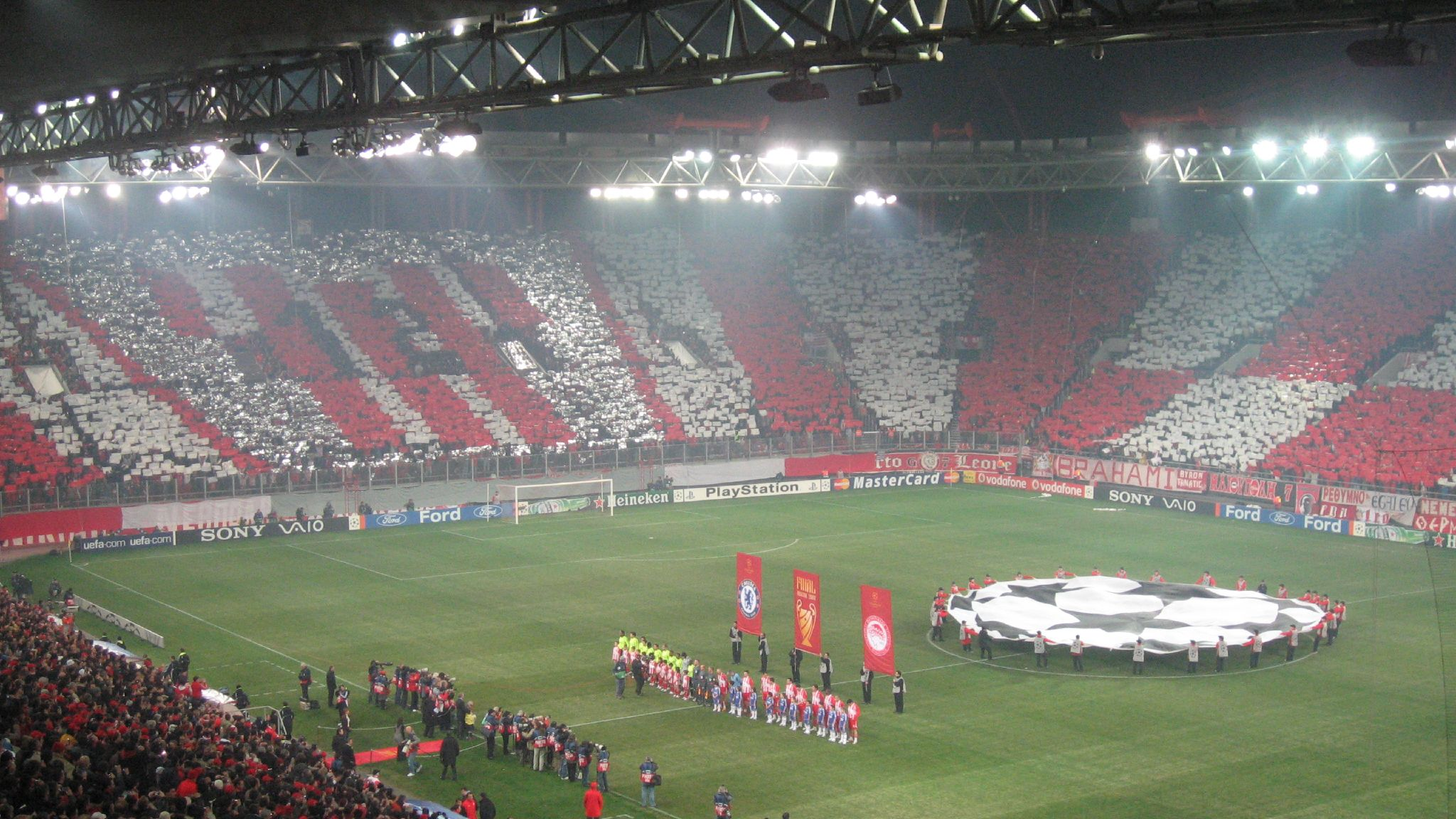
Karaiskakis Stadium, home of Olympiacos

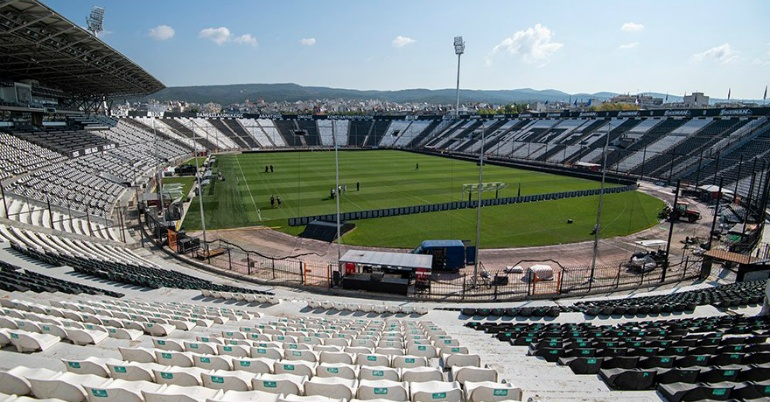
Toumba Stadium, home of PAOK

=== Head-to-head ===
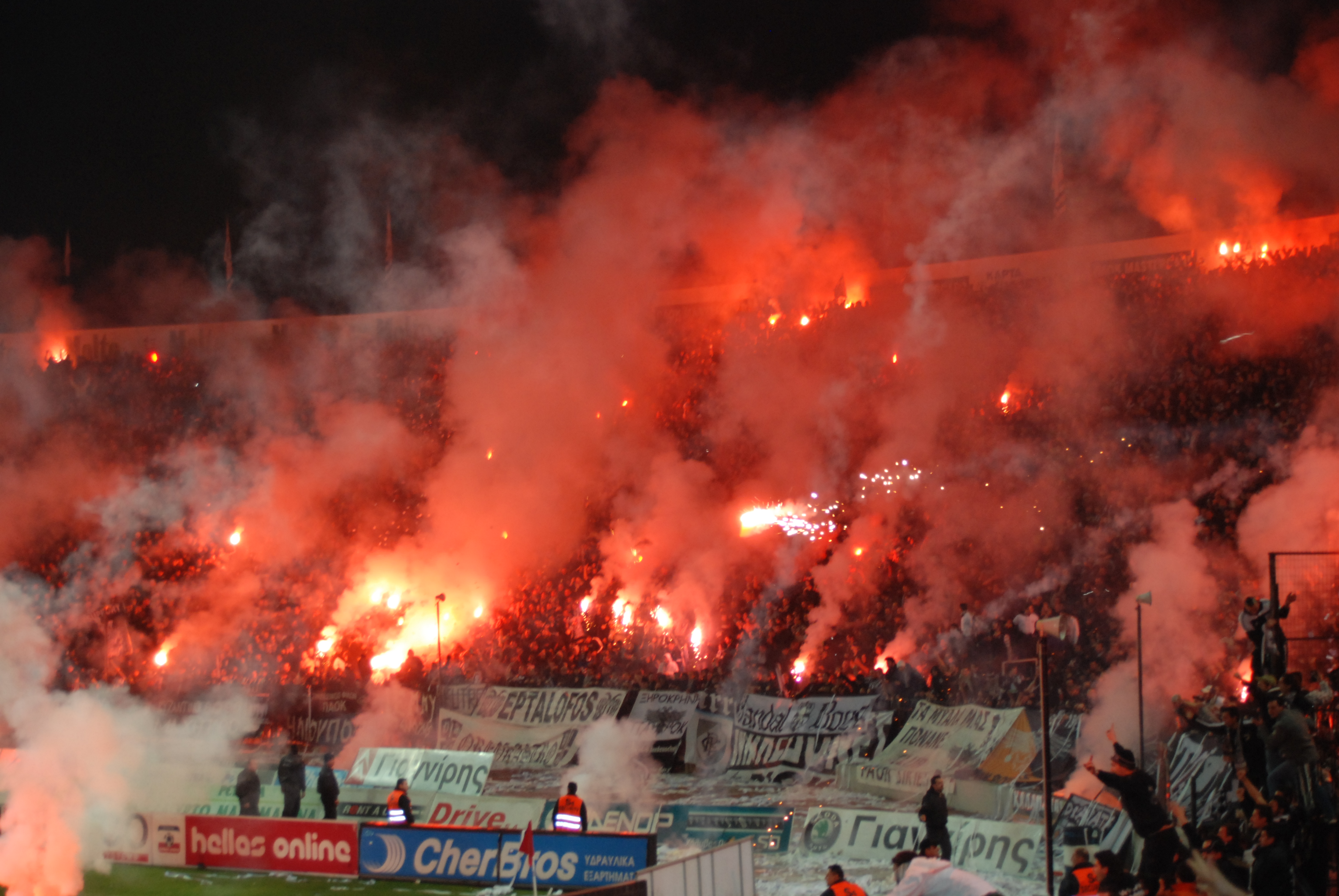
PAOK fans during a Greek Cup derby against Olympiacos at Toumba Stadium (February 2009).

	Olympiacos wins	Draws	PAOK wins
Panhellenic Championship (1927–1959)
At Olympiacos home	8	1	2
At PAOK home	7	1	3
Total	15	2	5
Alpha Ethniki / Super League (1959–present)
At Olympiacos home	51	12	13
At PAOK home	21	18	36
Total	72	30	49
Greek Cup
At Olympiacos home	12	5	3
At PAOK home	2	2	7
Neutral field	2	1	2
Total	16	8	12
Official Matches Total
209	103	40	66

=== Records ===
- Record Alpha Ethniki / Super League win
  - Olympiacos
    - Home: Olympiacos – PAOK 6–0, Karaiskakis Stadium, 3 June 1962
      (Psychos 40', 47', Sideris 76', 80', 81', 84' pen.)
    - Away: PAOK – Olympiacos 0–4, Toumba Stadium, 27 January 1965
      (Botinos 20', Gioutsos 47', Aganian 59', Sideris 74')
  - PAOK
    - Home: PAOK – Olympiacos 6–1, Serres Municipal Stadium, 6 December 1987
      (Bannon 5', Mavromatis 14', Singas 18', Baniotis 41', Borbokis 75', 89' – Tsalouchidis 50')
    - Away: Olympiacos – PAOK 0–4, Karaiskakis Stadium, 4 January 1976
      (Terzanidis 24', Koudas 56', 62', Guerino 77')
- Record Cup win
  - Olympiacos
    - Home: Olympiacos – PAOK 4–0, Karaiskakis Stadium, 28 May 1975
      (Persidis 16', Kritikopoulos 70', 90'+1', Losanta 73')
    - Neutral field: Olympiacos – PAOK 4–0, Leoforos Alexandras Stadium, 11 March 1951
      (Mouratis 27', Darivas 66', Drossos 75', 80')
    - Away: PAOK – Olympiacos 1–2, Toumba Stadium, 27 November 1996
      (Zouboulis 20' – Alexandris 52', Đorđević 75' pen.)
  - PAOK
    - Home: PAOK – Olympiacos 3–0, Toumba Stadium, 9 January 1991
      (Karageorgiou 6' pen., Borbokis 43', Hassan 52')
    - Neutral field: Olympiacos – PAOK 2–4, Nikos Goumas Stadium, 12 May 2001
      (Đorđević 78' pen., Choutos 90'+2' – Engomitis 4', Borbokis 31', Georgiadis 46', Nalitzis 85')
    - Away: Olympiacos – PAOK 0–2, Karaiskakis Stadium, 14 January 2026
      (Mythou 7', Ozdoyev 15')
- Longest league win streak
  - Olympiacos: 7, 22 February 1998 – 14 October 2001
    - Home: 14, 12 November 1989 – 11 January 2004
    - Away: 3, 3 October 1998 – 14 October 2001
  - PAOK: 3, 4 January 1976 – 3 April 1977
    - Home: 11, 11 June 1972 – 23 January 1983
    - Away: 2, 24 January 2010 – 21 November 2010
- Longest Cup win streak
  - Olympiacos: 4, 27 May 1992 – 12 May 2001
    - Home: 5, 24 January 1990 – 12 March 2003
    - Away: 1
  - PAOK: 4, 12 May 2001 – 4 February 2009
    - Home: 4, 26 February 2003 – 2 March 2016
    - Away: 1
- Longest unbeaten league streak
  - Olympiacos: 12, 22 February 1998 – 11 January 2004
    - Home: 14, 12 November 1989 – 11 January 2004
    - Away: 12, 31 October 1998 – 9 May 2010
  - PAOK: 4, 31 May 1981 – 12 June 1983 and 5 October 2025 – present
    - Home: 21, 3 January 1971 – 24 May 1992
    - Away: 3, 30 September 2018 – 27 January 2021
- Longest unbeaten Cup streak
  - Olympiacos: 7, 11 March 1951 – 6 February 1980
    - Home: 6, 20 November 1985 – 12 March 2003
    - Away: 2, 20 May 1992 – 26 February 2003
  - PAOK: 4, 12 May 2001 – 4 March 2009 and 22 May 2021 – present
    - Home: 4, 26 February 2003 – 2 March 2016
    - Away: 4, 10 March 1976 – 24 January 1990
- Attendance records
  - Olympiacos home:
    - 74,232 Olympiacos – PAOK 0–1, Athens Olympic Stadium, 2 October 1988
  - PAOK home:
    - 45,147 PAOK – Olympiacos 2–1, Toumba Stadium, 5 December 1976

== Head-to-head ranking in Super League Greece ==
P.	60	61	62	63	64	65	66	67	68	69	70	71	72	73	74	75	76	77	78	79	80	81	82	83	84	85	86	87	88	89	90	91	92	93	94	95	96	97	98	99	00	01	02	03	04	05	06	07	08	09	10	11	12	13	14	15	16	17	18	19	20	21	22	23	24	25	26
1							1	1						1	1	1	1				1	1	1	1		1		1										1	1	1	1	1	1	1		1	1	1	1	1		1	1	1	1	1	1	1		1	1	1	1		1	1	
2		2	2		2				2	2			2	2				2	2	2					2					2		2	2			2									2						2			2				2	2	2	2	2	2				2
3	3			3		3					3					3	3	3					3						3		3			3	3	3	3								3							3			3	3			3					3	3	3	3
4				4				4							4				4	4		4		4		4					4	4	4					4	4	4		4	4	4						4							4							4			
5										5	5		5								5				5		5	5						5	5						5					5					5		5														
6			6				6																																								6	6																			
7	7											7																																																							
8					8	8																							8	8																																					
9									9			9																																					9																		
10		10																									10																																								
11																																																																			
12																																																																			
13																																																																			
14																																					14																														
15																																																																			
16																																																																			
17																																																																			
18																																																																			

- Total: Olympiacos with 58 higher finishes, PAOK with 9 higher finishes.

== Matches list ==
=== Panhellenic Championship (1927–28 - 1958–59) ===
	Olympiacos – PAOK					PAOK – Olympiacos				
Season	R.	Date	Venue	Atten.	Score	R.	Date	Venue	Atten.	Score
1930–31	1	01–02–1931	Neo Phaliron Velodrome	N/A	3–1	10	09–06–1931	Aris Old Stadium	N/A	3–0
1931–32	9	08–05–1932	Neo Phaliron Velodrome	N/A	2–3	4	27–03–1932	Aris Old Stadium	N/A	0–2
1935–36	7	09–02–1936	Leoforos Alexandras Stadium	N/A	4–3	1	10–11–1935	Sintrivani Stadium	N/A	2–2
1936–37	3	18–04–1937	Leoforos Alexandras Stadium	N/A	2–0	1	04–04–1937	Sintrivani Stadium	N/A	1–5
1947–48	2	13–04–1948	Leoforos Alexandras Stadium	N/A	2–1	4	06–06–1948	Sintrivani Stadium	N/A	0–3
1953–54	9	06–06–1954	Leoforos Alexandras Stadium	N/A	1–0	4	09–05–1954	Sintrivani Stadium	N/A	1–2
1954–55	2	03–04–1955	Leoforos Alexandras Stadium	N/A	1–0	6	05–06–1955	Sintrivani Stadium	N/A	2–3
1955–56	4	29–04–1956	Leoforos Alexandras Stadium	N/A	0–0	9	17–06–1956	Sintrivani Stadium	N/A	1–2
1956–57	2	20–01–1957	Karaiskakis Stadium	N/A	4–0	11	31–03–1957	Sintrivani Stadium	N/A	2–1
1957–58	17	08–06–1958	Karaiskakis Stadium	N/A	0–1	7	02–03–1958	Sintrivani Stadium	N/A	1–0
1958–59	6	22–02–1959	Karaiskakis Stadium	N/A	4–0	15	31–05–1959	Sintrivani Stadium	N/A	2–3

=== Super League Greece (1959–60 – present) ===
	Olympiacos – PAOK					PAOK – Olympiacos				
Season	R.	Date	Venue	Atten.	Score	R.	Date	Venue	Atten.	Score
1959–60	20	06–04–1960	Karaiskakis Stadium	11,972	1–2	5	22–11–1959	Toumba Stadium	8,864	2–0
1960–61	10	27–11–1960	Karaiskakis Stadium	N/A	1–1	25	14–05–1961	Toumba Stadium	N/A	0–2
1961–62	28	03–06–1962	Karaiskakis Stadium	N/A	6–0	13	14–01–1962	Toumba Stadium	N/A	0–1
1962–63	17	03–02–1963	Karaiskakis Stadium	N/A	3–2	2	30–09–1962	Toumba Stadium	19,510	2–2
1963–64	10	27–11–1963	Nikos Goumas Stadium	24,796	2–0^{1}	25	29–03–1964	Toumba Stadium	18,884	0–0
1964–65	27	06–06–1965	Karaiskakis Stadium	15,951	5–2	12	27–01–1965	Toumba Stadium	17,309	0–4
1965–66	25	15–05–1966	Karaiskakis Stadium	28,042	2–0	10	30–01–1966	Toumba Stadium	22,736	3–2
1966–67	6	27–11–1966	Karaiskakis Stadium	40,250	3–2	21	19–03–1967	Toumba Stadium	31,504	2–0
1967–68	8	26–11–1967	Karaiskakis Stadium	28,914	0–1	25	24–03–1968	Toumba Stadium	26,446	1–0
1968–69	11	15–12–1968	Karaiskakis Stadium	21,116	3–0	28	20–04–1969	Toumba Stadium	26,745	2–1
1969–70	18	01–02–1970	Karaiskakis Stadium	N/A	1–1	1	21–09–1969	Toumba Stadium	35,740	1–2
1970–71	31	23–05–1971	Karaiskakis Stadium	34,960	1–0	14	03–01–1971	Toumba Stadium	25,462	0–0
1971–72	17	23–01–1972	Karaiskakis Stadium	37,405	1–1	34	25–06–1972	Toumba Stadium	21,161	4–3
1972–73	20	25–02–1973	Karaiskakis Stadium	41,052	1–0	3	01–10–1972	Toumba Stadium	42,150	1–0
1973–74	11	16–12–1973	Karaiskakis Stadium	41,110	3–0	28	21–04–1974	Toumba Stadium	42,976	1–0
1974–75	26	13–04–1975	Karaiskakis Stadium	39,210	3–2	9	15–12–1974	Toumba Stadium	37,448	2–0
1975–76	11	04–01–1976	Karaiskakis Stadium	39,030	0–4	26	26–04–1976	Toumba Stadium	33,378	3–1
1976–77	26	03–04–1977	Karaiskakis Stadium	39,200	2–0	9	05–12–1976	Toumba Stadium	45,147	2–1
1977–78	13	11–12–1977	Karaiskakis Stadium	15,714	0–0	30	16–04–1978	Toumba Stadium	30,477	1–0
1978–79	5	14–10–1978	Karaiskakis Stadium	27,704	1–0	22	04–03–1979	Toumba Stadium	25,362	2–0
1979–80	34	18–05–1980	Karaiskakis Stadium	35,470	2–0	17	20–01–1980	Toumba Stadium	36,016	2–0
1980–81	15	28–12–1980	Karaiskakis Stadium	35,500	1–0	32	31–05–1981	Toumba Stadium	21,359	1–0
1981–82	28	11–04–1982	Karaiskakis Stadium	35,450	0–0	11	13–12–1981	Toumba Stadium	22,744	3–0
1982–83	32	12–06–1983	Karaiskakis Stadium	28,393	2–0	15	23–01–1983	Toumba Stadium	33,334	1–1
1983–84	19	05–02–1984	Karaiskakis Stadium	25,032	1–0	4	25–09–1983	Serres Municipal Stadium	13,138	4–0
1984–85	19	17–02–1985	Athens Olympic Stadium	57,581	2–1	4	21–10–1984	Toumba Stadium	41,073	1–0
1985–86	11	01–12–1985	Athens Olympic Stadium	37,604	2–0	26	30–03–1986	Toumba Stadium	24,970	1–0
1986–87	20	01–03–1987	Athens Olympic Stadium	53,720	1–1	5	05–10–1986	Toumba Stadium	40,718	4–1
1987–88	25	27–03–1988	Athens Olympic Stadium	46,027	2–1	10	06–12–1987	Serres Municipal Stadium	10,827	6–1
1988–89	4	02–10–1988	Athens Olympic Stadium	74,232	0–1	19	12–02–1989	Toumba Stadium	32,112	1–0
1989–90	9	12–11–1989	Karaiskakis Stadium	30,716	4–0	26	25–03–1990	Toumba Stadium	17,169	4–1
1990–91	9	02–12–1990	Karaiskakis Stadium	23,974	3–2	26	10–04–1991	Toumba Stadium	17,870	3–2
1991–92	15	12–01–1992	Karaiskakis Stadium	18,004	3–2	32	24–05–1992	Toumba Stadium	8,577	1–2
1992–93	31	09–05–1993	Karaiskakis Stadium	11,527	2–0	14	20–12–1992	Toumba Stadium	7,988	0–0
1993–94	3	05–09–1993	Karaiskakis Stadium	12,237	1–0	20	16–01–1994	Toumba Stadium	10,291	1–1
1994–95	25	26–03–1995	Karaiskakis Stadium	16,497	2–0	8	06–11–1994	Toumba Stadium	26,404	3–0
1995–96	28	07–04–1996	Karaiskakis Stadium	6,191	1–0	11	26–11–1995	Trikala Municipal Stadium	6,699	0–0
1996–97	13	22–12–1996	Karaiskakis Stadium	14,694	1–0	30	20–04–1997	Toumba Stadium	35,850	0–0
1997–98	23	22–02–1998	Athens Olympic Stadium	32,275	2–0	6	18–10–1997	Toumba Stadium	26,471	2–1
1998–99	25	04–04–1999	Athens Olympic Stadium	16,582	2–1	8	31–10–1998	Toumba Stadium	25,858	1–2^{2}
1999–2000	7	08–11–1999	Athens Olympic Stadium	11,977	4–1	24	19–03–2000	Toumba Stadium	25,550	0–2
2000–01	23	17–03–2001	Athens Olympic Stadium	12,925	1–0	8	27–11–2000	Toumba Stadium	5,723	2–4
2001–02	16	17–02–2002	Athens Olympic Stadium	37,825	3–2	3	14–10–2001	Toumba Stadium	22,200	1–1
2002–03	20	23–02–2003	Georgios Kamaras Stadium	9,518	4–3	5	26–10–2003	Toumba Stadium	22,296	1–1
2003–04	16	11–01–2004	Georgios Kamaras Stadium	9,164	1–2	1	24–08–2003	Toumba Stadium	Cl. doors	0–2
2004–05	6	30–10–2004	Karaiskakis Stadium	26,972	5–1	21	06–03–2005	Toumba Stadium	23,950	1–1
2005–06	6	16–10–2005	Karaiskakis Stadium	Cl. doors	1–2	21	26–02–2006	Toumba Stadium	7,050	1–2
2006–07	3	09–09–2006	Karaiskakis Stadium	29,140	2–0	18	21–01–2007	Toumba Stadium	23,483	2–3
2007–08	7	03–11–2007	Karaiskakis Stadium	28,077	2–1	22	23–02–2008	Toumba Stadium	22,000	1–1
2008–09	10	16–11–2008	Karaiskakis Stadium	29,482	2–0	25	08–03–2009	Toumba Stadium	22,214	0–0
2009–10	19	24–01–2010	Karaiskakis Stadium	26,139	0–1	4	20–09–2009	Toumba Stadium	23,010	1–2
2009–10	p-o	12–05–2010	Karaiskakis Stadium	15,829	0–1	p-o	09–05–2010	Toumba Stadium	24,109	1–0
2010–11	11	21–11–2010	Karaiskakis Stadium	30,275	3–0	26	13–03–2011	Toumba Stadium	20,023	2–1
2011–12	5	02–10–2011	Karaiskakis Stadium	28,772	2–1	20	05–02–2012	Toumba Stadium	18,299	0–2
2012–13	27	31–03–2013	Karaiskakis Stadium	28,417	0–0	12	25–11–2012	Toumba Stadium	23,023	1–1
2013–14	11	10–11–2013	Karaiskakis Stadium	27,189	4–0	28	09–03–2014	Toumba Stadium	23,345	2–1
2014–15	6	03–12–2014	Karaiskakis Stadium	28,527	1–2	23	08–02–2015	Toumba Stadium	24,411	0–0
2015–16	21	07–02–2016	Karaiskakis Stadium	29,576	1–0	6	04–10–2015	Toumba Stadium	25,674	0–2
2016–17	8	23–10–2016	Karaiskakis Stadium	24,727	2–1	23	05–03–2017	Toumba Stadium	26,379	2–0
2017–18	8	22–10–2017	Karaiskakis Stadium	30,250	1–0	23	25–02–2018	Toumba Stadium	24,717	0–3^{3}
2018–19	5	30–09–2018	Karaiskakis Stadium	30,352	0–1	20	10–02–2019	Toumba Stadium	25,097	3–1
2019–20	12	01–12–2019	Karaiskakis Stadium	31,616	1–1	25	23–02–2020	Toumba Stadium	26,377	0–1
2019–20	p-o	12–07–2020	Karaiskakis Stadium	Cl. doors	0–1	p-o	07–06–2020	Toumba Stadium	Cl. doors	0–1
2020–21	19	27–01–2021	Karaiskakis Stadium	Cl. doors	3–0	6	13–01–2021	Toumba Stadium	Cl. doors	1–1
2020–21	p-o	12–05–2021	Karaiskakis Stadium	Cl. doors	1–0	p-o	18–04–2021	Toumba Stadium	Cl. doors	2–0
2021–22	7	24–10–2021	Karaiskakis Stadium	Cl. doors	2–1	20	30–01–2022	Toumba Stadium	Cl. doors	1–1
2021–22	p-o	14–05–2022	Karaiskakis Stadium	28,765	1–1	p-o	04–05–2022	Toumba Stadium	7,369	1–2
2022–23	8	17–10–2022	Karaiskakis Stadium	25,100	1–2	21	05–02–2023	Toumba Stadium	23,585	0–0
2022–23	p-o	05–04–2023	Karaiskakis Stadium	25,016	3–1	p-o	14–05–2023	Toumba Stadium	20,810	0–1
2023–24	10	05–11–2023	Karaiskakis Stadium	28,301	2–4	23	18–02–2024	Toumba Stadium	25,346	1–4
2023–24	p-o	21–04–2024	Karaiskakis Stadium	29,014	2–1	p-o	12–05–2024	Toumba Stadium	22,102	2–0
2024–25	24	23–02–2025	Karaiskakis Stadium	32,431	2–1	11	10–11–2024	Toumba Stadium	21,684	2–3
2024–25	p-o	04–05–2025	Karaiskakis Stadium	32,550	4–2	p-o	06–04–2025	Toumba Stadium	20,312	2–1
2025–26	24	08–03–2026	Karaiskakis Stadium	32,855	0–0	6	05–10–2025	Toumba Stadium	23,961	2–1
2025–26	p-o	10–05–2026	Karaiskakis Stadium	32,005	1–1	p-o	03–05–2026	Toumba Stadium	17,705	3–1
2025–26	10	08–11–2026	Karaiskakis Stadium		1–1	17	17–01–2027	Toumba Stadium		–

^{1} Match suspended at 27th minute (score: 1–0). Olympiacos were awarded a 2–0 win.
^{2} Match suspended at 83rd minute (score: 1–2). Remained as final result.
^{3} Match suspended before the kick-off. Olympiacos were awarded a 0–3 win.

=== Greek Cup ===
Season	Round	Olympiacos – PAOK				PAOK – Olympiacos				Winner
Season	Round	Date	Venue	Atten.	Score	Date	Venue	Atten.	Score	Winner
1950–51	Final	11–03–1951	Leoforos Alexandras Stadium	N/A	4–0					OSFP
1970–71	Final	09–06–1971	Karaiskakis Stadium	N/A	3–1					OSFP
1972–73	Final	17–06–1973	Karaiskakis Stadium	40,070	1–0					OSFP
1973–74	Final	16–06–1974	Nikos Goumas Stadium	26,402	2–2 (a.e.t.); 3–4 (p)					PAOK
1974–75	Semi-finals	28–05–1975	Karaiskakis Stadium	N/A	4–0					OSFP
1975–76	Round of 16	10–03–1976	Karaiskakis Stadium	38,846	1–1 (a.e.t.); 6–5 (p)					OSFP
1978–79	Round of 16	21–02–1979	Karaiskakis Stadium	29,453	2–2 (a.e.t.); 6–5 (p)					OSFP
1979–80	Round of 32	06–02–1980	Karaiskakis Stadium	38,150	1–2					PAOK
1980–81	Final	21–06–1981	Nikos Goumas Stadium	30,512	3–1					OSFP
1985–86	Additional round	20–11–1985	Athens Olympic Stadium	25,955	0–0 (a.e.t.); 4–3 (p)					OSFP
1989–90	Round of 16	24–01–1990	Karaiskakis Stadium	22,090	1–0 (a.e.t.); 5–3 (p)	10–01–1990	Toumba Stadium	27,217	1–0	OSFP
1990–91	Round of 32	05–12–1990	Karaiskakis Stadium	17,789	2–0	09–01–1991	Toumba Stadium	33,411	3–0	PAOK
1991–92	Final	27–05–1992	Karaiskakis Stadium	29,831	2–0	20–05–1992	Toumba Stadium	25,744	1–1	OSFP
1996–97	Round of 16	11–12–1996	Karaiskakis Stadium	4,503	2–1	27–11–1996	Toumba Stadium	20,498	1–2	OSFP
1999–2000	Round of 16	12–01–2000	Athens Olympic Stadium	17,317	2–1					OSFP
2000–01	Final	12–05–2001	Nikos Goumas Stadium	13,300	2–4					PAOK
2002–03	Quarter-finals	12–03–2003	Georgios Kamaras Stadium	11,466	1–2	26–02–2003	Toumba Stadium	17,647	3–1	PAOK
2008–09	Quarter-finals	04–03–2009	Karaiskakis Stadium	23,983	2–0 (a.e.t.)	04–02–2009	Toumba Stadium	21,043	1–0	OSFP
2010–11	Quarter-finals	19–01–2011	Karaiskakis Stadium	28,404	1–1	02–02–2011	Toumba Stadium	Cl. doors	1–0	PAOK
2013–14	Semi-finals	02–04–2014	Karaiskakis Stadium	N/A	2–1	16–04–2014	Toumba Stadium	N/A	1–0 (a)	PAOK
2015–16	Semi-finals	27–04–2016	Karaiskakis Stadium	—	3–0^{2}	02–03–2016	Toumba Stadium	24,496	0–3^{1}	OSFP
2019–20	Semi-finals	24–06–2020	Karaiskakis Stadium	Cl. doors	2–0	04–03–2020	Toumba Stadium	N/A	3–2	OSFP
2020–21	Final	22–05–2021	Athens Olympic Stadium	Cl. doors	1–2					PAOK
2021–22	Semi-finals	27–04–2022	Karaiskakis Stadium	N/A	1–1 (a.e.t.); (a)	21–04–2022	Toumba Stadium	25,284	0–0	PAOK
2025–26	Quarter-finals	14–01–2026	Karaiskakis Stadium	N/A	0–2					PAOK

^{1} Match suspended at 90th minute (score: 1–2). Olympiacos were awarded a 0–3 win.
^{2} PAOK didn't show up in the match, so Olympiacos were awarded a 3–0 win and advanced to the Final.

• Series won: Olympiacos 15, PAOK 10.

=== Unofficial matches ===
==== Friendly matches ====
The two clubs faced each other also in friendly matches.

Date	Venue	Match	Atten.	Score
09–10–1926	Iraklis Old Stadium	PAOK – Olympiacos	N/A	1–7
18–11–1934	Neo Phaliron Velodrome	Olympiacos – PAOK	N/A	4–2
30–08–1953	Sintrivani Stadium	PAOK – Olympiacos	N/A	2–1
13–09–1953	Leoforos Alexandras Stadium	Olympiacos – PAOK	N/A	4–1
20–09–1959	Toumba Stadium	PAOK – Olympiacos	14,050	1–1
13–09–1964	Karaiskakis Stadium	Olympiacos – PAOK	20,000	2–0
20–09–1964	Kaftanzoglio Stadium	PAOK – Olympiacos	17,000	2–0
12–09–1965	Toumba Stadium	PAOK – Olympiacos	15,000	1–2
07–11–1965	Karaiskakis Stadium	Olympiacos – PAOK	N/A	5–1
30–08–1970	Toumba Stadium	PAOK – Olympiacos	20,309	1–1
06–09–1970	Karaiskakis Stadium	Olympiacos – PAOK	N/A	1–3
15–06–1972	Karaiskakis Stadium	Olympiacos – PAOK	N/A	0–1
31–08–1972	Karaiskakis Stadium	Olympiacos – PAOK	N/A	1–2
10–09–1975	Toumba Stadium	PAOK – Olympiacos	N/A	2–2
20–09–1975	Karaiskakis Stadium	Olympiacos – PAOK	N/A	0–1
02–06–1976	Toumba Stadium	PAOK – Olympiacos	N/A	1–2
01–09–1977	Karaiskakis Stadium	Olympiacos – PAOK	N/A	3–1
21–08–1978	Kaftanzoglio Stadium	PAOK – Olympiacos	N/A	0–0
27–08–1978	Karaiskakis Stadium	Olympiacos – PAOK	24,076	0–0
29–08–1979	Karaiskakis Stadium	Olympiacos – PAOK	N/A	2–0
24–08–1980	Karaiskakis Stadium	Olympiacos – PAOK	N/A	2–1
30–08–1981	Karaiskakis Stadium	Olympiacos – PAOK	N/A	2–1
23–08–1983	Toumba Stadium	PAOK – Olympiacos	N/A	0–1
27–08–1984	Toumba Stadium	PAOK – Olympiacos	N/A	0–3
14–08–1988	Kaftanzoglio Stadium	PAOK – Olympiacos	N/A	0–1
03–08–1998	Athens Olympic Stadium	Olympiacos – PAOK	7,928	3–0

==== OPAP Summer League ====
The OPAP Summer League was a football competition held during the summer seasons from 1968 to 1974, under the Greek military dictatorship.

Date	Round	Venue	Match	Atten.	Score
14–09–1969	Final	Lamia Municipal Stadium	Olympiacos – PAOK	6,957	0–2
05–09–1971	5th place playoff	Alcazar Stadium	PAOK – Olympiacos	3,800	1–1 (a.e.t.); 8–7 (p)
