= 1950–51 Greek Football Cup =

1950–51 Greek Cup
Tournament details
- Country: Greece
- Teams: 145

Final positions
- Champions: Olympiacos (2nd title)
- Runners-up: PAOK

Tournament statistics
- Matches played: 152
- Goals scored: 521 (3.43 per match)

The 1950–51 Greek Football Cup was the ninth edition of the Greek Football Cup. The competition culminated with the Greek Cup final, held at Leoforos Alexandras Stadium, on 11 March 1951. The match was contested by Olympiacos and PAOK, with Olympiacos winning by 4–0.

== Calendar ==
Round	Date(s)	Fixtures	Clubs	New entries
First Round		59	145 → 88	121
Second Round		27	88 → 65	15
Third Round		27	65 → 40	1
Fourth Round		11	40 → 28	none
Fifth Round		9	28 → 20	none
Sixth Round		4	20 → 16	none
Round of 16	14, 18, 25 January 1951	8	16 → 8	8
Quarter-finals	11, 14, 15 February 1951	4	8 → 4	none
Semi-finals	25, 28 February 1951	2	4 → 2	none
Final	11 March 1951	1	2 → 1	none

== Qualification round ==
=== First round ===
Team 1	Score/Agg.	Team 2	Match	Replay
Central Greece/Islands Football Clubs Association
Atromitos	1–0	Ethnikos Asteras		
Panerythraikos	1–2	Eleftheroupoli		
AE Pangrati	4–1	Niki Plaka		
Kallithaikos	0–4	Ilisiakos		
AE Chalandri	3–0	AO Zografou		
Panathinaikos	3–0	Iraklis Athens		
Yperochi	1–2	Doxa Vyronas		
Apollon Athens	5–0	Armeniki		
Attikos	5–1	Sparta	1–1 (a.e.t.)	4–1
AE Nea Ionia	4–0	Afovos		
AGO P. Kokkinia	0–2 (w/o)	AE Karava		
Neapolis	0–1	Aiolikos Tzitzifies		
Achilleus Piraeus	0–2 (w/o)	Doxa Piraeus		
Proodeftiki	1–6	Argonaftis Piraeus		
AE Nikaia	1–2	Aris Piraeus		
Panelefsiniakos	4–1	Filathloi Piraeus		
Aias Salamina	16–0	Ampelakiakos		
Pelopas Kiato	1–4^{1}	Olympiacos Corinth		
Iraklis Xylokastro	2–1	Aris Xylokastro		
Panargiakos	2–1	Olympiacos Loutraki		
Atromitos Piraeus	bye			
Fostiras	bye			
Hellas Syros	bye			
Achilleus Corinth	bye			
Patras/Western Greece Football Clubs Association
Panegieus	1–1 (a.e.t.)^{2}	Thyella Patras		
Ethnikos Amaliada	0–1	Lefkos Asteras Amaliadas		
Apollon Pyrgos	2–1	Ethnikos Pyrgos		
Iraklis Pyrgos	1–0	AEK Pyrgos		
Averof Ioannina	2–4^{3}	Atromitos Ioannina		
Aris Kerkyra	?^{4}	Elispondos Kerkyra		
Apollon Kalamata	6–1	AEK Kalamata	1–1 (a.e.t.)	5–0
Pamisos Messini	4–6	Prasina Poulia		
Crete Football Clubs Association
EGOH	2–1	Keravnos Poron Heraklion		
OFI	?	Ermis Heraklion		
Irodotos	1–5	Ergotelis		
Keravnos Rethymno	5–0	Asteras Rethymno		
Ionia Chania	1–3	Talos Chania		
Iraklis Heraklion	bye			
Atlantida Chania	bye			
Thessaly Football Clubs Association
Olympiacos Volos	4–2	Ethnikos Volos		
Pagasitikos Volos	6–2	Kentavros Volos		
Iraklis Larissa	5–0	Toxotis Larissa		
AE Trikala	2–1	Achilleus Trikala		
Anagennisi Karditsa	4–7	Niki Volos	4–4 (a.e.t.)	0–3
Olympiacos Lamia	2–1	Pallamiaki Enosis		
Macedonia Football Clubs Association
Apollon Serres	6–4	Iraklis Pentapoli		
Ethnikos Sidirokastro	?	Megas Alexandros Irakleia		
Iraklis Serres	?	Megas Alexandros Chrysou		
Olympos Katerini	0–2 (w/o)^{5}	Megas Alexandros Katerini		
Hellas Florina	?	Megas Alexandros Florina	1–1 (a.e.t.)	?
Vermion Veria	3–1	Olympiacos Naousa		
Iraklis	4–1	AE Ampelokipoi Thessaloniki		
MENT	2–3	PAE Dioikitirio		
PO Xirokrini	2–1	Apollon Kalamarias		
Thermaikos	1–0	Meliteus		
APE Langadas	?	Megas Alexandros		
Eastern Macedonia Football Clubs Association
Iraklis Kavala	1–3	Aris Zygos		
Orfeas Eleftheroupoli	1–3	AEK Kavala		
Filippoi Kavala	3–1	Vyron Kavala		
Aris Drama	4–1	AE Kyrgion		
Elpida Drama	4–1	Iraklis Prosotsani		
Doxa Drama	4–0	Vyron Drama		
Aspida Xanthi	?	Orfeas Xanthi		
Orfeas Komotini	bye			

^{1} Suspended due to incidends in favour of Olympiacos Corinth. That remained as the final score.

^{2} Suspended at the extra time due to incidends at the expense of Panegieus.

^{3} Averof Ioannina initially won 2–1, but Atromitos Ioannina objected and the match was replayed.

^{4} The match was suspended at the second half due to rainfall and was replayed.

^{5} Olympos Katerini won 5–2, but were zeroed.

=== Second round ===
Team 1	Score/Agg.	Team 2	Match	Replay	Replay
Central Greece/Islands Football Clubs Association
Achilleus Corinth	1–0	AE Pangrati			
Olympiacos Corinth	7–2	Iraklis Xylokastro			
Orchomenos	?	AEK Chalkida			
Pallesviakos	1–2	Aris Mytilene			
Patras/Western Greece Football Clubs Association
Asteras Patras	5–2	Proodeftiki Patras			
Achilleus Patras	11–0	Elpis Eglykada			
Apollon Patras	4–1	Iraklis Patras			
Olympiakos Patras	2–0	AEK Patras			
Aris Kerkyra	5–2	Olympos Kerkyra			
Iraklis Pyrgos	5–0	Apollon Pyrgos			
Atromitos Ioannina	2–0	Panetolikos			
Prasina Poulia	0–1	Apollon Kalamata			
Lefkos Asteras Amaliadas	bye				
Thyella Patras	bye				
Panachaiki	bye				
Crete Football Clubs Association
Ergotelis	5–1	Iraklis Heraklion	? (a.e.t.)	5–1	—
Keravnos Rethymno	2–0	EGOH			
Ionia Chania	3–1	Atlantida Chania			
Thessaly Football Clubs Association
AE Trikala	2–3	Iraklis Larissa			
Niki Volos	3–0	Pagasitikos Volos			
Olympiacos Lamia	0–3	Olympiacos Volos			
Macedonia Football Clubs Association
Megas Alexandros Katerini	?	Vermion Veria			
Eastern Macedonia Football Clubs Association
AEK Kavala	2–0	Aris Zygos			
Filippoi Kavala	4–7	Doxa Drama	2–2 (a.e.t.)	2–5	—
Elpida Drama	10–8	Aris Drama	3–2 (a.e.t.)^{6}	4–4 (a.e.t.)	3–2 (a.e.t.)^{7}
Orfeas Komotini	2–1	Aspida Xanthi			

^{6} Suspended due to darkness.

^{7} Suspended at the extra time due to incidends at the expense of Aris Drama.

=== Third round ===
Team 1	Score/Agg.	Team 2	Match	Replay
Central Greece/Islands Football Clubs Association
Fostiras	2–0	Atromitos Piraeus		
AE Nea Ionia	1–0	Aiolikos Tzitzifies		
Aris Piraeus	6–1	Argonaftis Piraeus		
AE Karava	4–3	Doxa Piraeus	2–2 (a.e.t.)	2–1
Apollon Athens	3–0	Attikos		
Panathinaikos	6–0	Doxa Vyronas		
AE Chalandri	2–7	Eleftheroupoli		
Aias Salamina	4–2	Achilleus Corinth		
Panargiakos	1–3	Ilisiakos		
Orchomenos	1–3	Atromitos		
Panelefsiniakos	bye			
Olympiacos Corinth	bye			
Patras/Western Greece Football Clubs Association
Aris Kerkyra	3–1	Atromitos Ioannina		
Panachaiki	3–0	Asteras Patras		
Olympiakos Patras	0–1	Thyella Patras		
Iraklis Pyrgos	0–2	Achilleus Patras		
Lefkos Asteras Amaliadas	0–1	Apollon Patras		
Spartiatikos	1–4	Apollon Kalamata		
Crete Football Clubs Association
Ergotelis	2–0	Keravnos Rethymno		
Ionia Chania	0–1	OFI		
Thessaly Football Clubs Association
Niki Volos	0–1	Olympiacos Volos		
Macedonia Football Clubs Association
Hellas Florina	1–5	Megas Alexandros	1–1 (a.e.t.)	0–4
Megas Alexandros Katerini	?	PO Xirokrini		
Ethnikos Sidirokastro	1–4	Apollon Serres		
Iraklis Serres	2–1 (a.e.t.)	Iraklis		
PAE Dioikitirio	1–2	Thermaikos		
Eastern Macedonia Football Clubs Association
AEK Kavala	0–1	Doxa Drama		

=== Fourth round ===
Team 1	Score/Agg.	Team 2	Match	Replay
Central Greece/Islands Football Clubs Association
Fostiras	0–2 (w/o)	Panelefsiniakos		
Atromitos	1–0	Olympiacos Corinth		
AE Karava	2–4	Eleftheroupoli		
Aias Salamina	4–3	Aris Piraeus		
Panathinaikos	2–1	Ilisiakos		
Apollon Athens	2–1	AE Nea Ionia		
Patras/Western Greece Football Clubs Association
Aris Kerkyra	2–0 (w/o)	Panachaiki		
Achilleus Patras	1–0	Apollon Patras		
Apollon Kalamata	1–0^{8}	Thyella Patras		
Crete Football Clubs Association
OFI	4–3	Ergotelis	2–2 (a.e.t.)	2–1
Thessaly Football Clubs Association
Olympiacos Volos	2–3	Iraklis Larissa		
Macedonia Football Clubs Association
Apollon Serres	?	Thermaikos		

^{8}The match was replayed after the first match was suspended due to rainfall at the extra time while the score was 1–1.

=== Fifth round ===
Team 1	Score/Agg.	Team 2	Match	Replay
Central Greece/Islands Football Clubs Association
Aias Salamina	6–2	Atromitos		
Panathinaikos	2–0	Panelefsiniakos		
Apollon Athens	3–0	Eleftheroupoli		
Patras/Western Greece Football Clubs Association
Achilleus Patras	4–1	Apollon Kalamata		
Macedonia Football Clubs Association
PO Xirokrini	?	Megas Alexandros		
Iraklis Serres	2–1	Apollon Serres		
Eastern Macedonia Football Clubs Association
Orfeas Komotini	?	Elpida Drama		
Doxa Drama	?	Iraklis Serres	? (a.e.t.)	4–1

=== Sixth round ===
Team 1	Score	Team 2
Central Greece/Islands Football Clubs Association
Aris Mytilene	0–6	Apollon Athens
Hellas Syros	0–1	Aias Salamina
Panathinaikos	bye	
Patras/Western Greece Football Clubs Association
Achilleus Patras	2–0 (w/o)^{9}	Aris Kerkyra
Eastern Macedonia Football Clubs Association
Elpida Drama	?	Doxa Drama

^{9} Aris Kerkyra won 3–4 but Achilleus Patras objected for illegal usage of 2 Aris Kerkyra's football players and were awarded the match.

== Knockout phase ==
In the knockout phase, teams play against each other over a single match. If the match ends up as a draw, extra time will be played and if the match remains a draw a replay match is set at the home of the guest team which the extra time rule stands as well. That procedure will be repeated until a winner occurs.
The mechanism of the draws for each round is as follows:

- In the draw for the round of 16, the eight top teams of each association are seeded and the eight clubs that passed the qualification round are unseeded.
  The seeded teams are drawn against the unseeded teams with the exception of 2 draws.
- In the draws for the quarter-finals onwards, there are no seedings, and teams from the same group can be drawn against each other.

== Bracket ==
Round of 16
Olympiacos	0	3
Panionios	0	0
Ergotelis	0
Apollon Athens	2
Makedonikos	2
Megas Alexandros	1
AEK Athens	2
Aias Salamina	1
Elpida Drama	3
PAOK	4
Iraklis Larissa	0
Aris	5
Achilleus Patras	0
Panathinaikos (w/o)	2
OFI	0
Ethnikos	4

Quarter-finals
Olympiacos	3
Makedonikos	2
Asteras Athens	3
AEK Athens	0
PAOK (a.e.t.)	4
Aris	2
Panathinaikos	3
Ethnikos	0

Semi-finals
Olympiacos	3
Asteras Athens	1
PAOK	1
Panathinaikos	0

Final
Olympiacos	4
PAOK	0

== Round of 16 ==
Team 1	Score/Agg.	Team 2	Match	Replay
AEK Athens	2–1	Aias Salamina		
Apollon Athens	1–2	Asteras Athens		
Elpida Drama	3–4	PAOK		
Iraklis Larissa	0–5	Aris		
OFI	0–4	Ethnikos		
Makedonikos	2–1	Megas Alexandros		
Olympiacos	3–0	Panionios	0–0 (a.e.t.)	3–0
Achilleus Patras	0–2 (w/o)	Panathinaikos		

== Quarter-finals ==
Team 1	Score	Team 2
Panathinaikos	3–0	Ethnikos
Asteras Athens	3–0	AEK Athens
Olympiacos	6–2	Makedonikos
PAOK	4–2 (a.e.t.)	Aris

== Semi-finals ==
Team 1	Score	Team 2
PAOK	1–0	Panathinaikos
Olympiacos	3–1	Asteras Athens

== Final ==
11 March 1951
17:00 EET

Olympiacos	4–0	PAOK
Mouratis 27'; Darivas 66'; Drosos 75', 80'	Report

Leoforos Alexandras Stadium, Athens
Attendance: 15,000
Referee: Sotiris Asprogerakas (Athens)
