= Erani Filiatra =

Greek sporting club

- Full name: Athlitikos Podosfairikos Syllogos Filiatra "I Erani"
- Founded: 1935; 91 years ago
- Ground: Filiatra Old Football Field
- Capacity: 500
- Chairman: Grigorios Stamatopoulos
- Manager: Kostas Liberopoulos
- League: Messinia FCA First Division
- 2025–26: Messinia FCA First Division, 2nd

Athlitikos Podosfairikos Syllogos Filiatra "I Erani", commonly known as Erani Filiatra (Greek: Εράνη Φιλιατρών) is a Greek club in Filiatra, Messenia. It includes football (soccer), basketball and chess.

== Informative sources ==
Erani was founded in 1935 and was fully recognized in 1947. Its colours are green and white. Its name came from Erana, an ancient city in the area of Triphylia.

== Football (soccer) ==
In football (soccer), they had participated in the championship role in the organizations of the Messinia FCA and won the prefectural championship several times. It most wins are in the Messinia Cup with six titles and nine participations in the finals.

From 1989-90, the team participated in many times in the Fourth Division and the Third Division in the 1993-94 season. In recent years and the 2009-10 season, they currently play in the Fourth Division.

=== Players ===
From Erani featured many famous footballers or soccer players which played in teams at the first and second division. The most famous of these were the Liberopoulos cousins and Nikos Froussos:

- Nikos Liberopoulos, played with his great career at Panathinaikos, AEK and in Germany.
- Sotiris Liberopoulos, played for the Greek team under 21 and played many times in the First Division.
- Nikolaos Frousos, played in Ionikos, PAOK and Anorthosis.

=== Playoff history ===
The time that Erani entered the finals was in 1990 and challenged Miltiadis and lost 2-1, their next chance was in 1992 and challenged with Apollon Kalamata, their luck for their first title failed as they lost 2-1, then again Erani lost 2-1 with Messini the following year. Their first cup was not achieved until 1995 when they bet Omonoia Kalamata 3-0. In 2001, they won their second beating Messiniakos 3-2, their third beating Pamissos Messini 2-0 and their fourth with the same team but tied apiece but won by penalty kicks. Their fifth was with another rival Sperchogeia beating them 1-0. Their sixth and recent title was won when the Erani beat over Messiniakos with 1-0.

=== Achievements ===
- Messinia Football Clubs Association (5):

1987, 1989, 2002, 2006, 2023

- Messinia Cup (9):

1995, 2001, 2002, 2003, 2004, 2009, 2010, 2012, 2024

- Messinia Cup (finalist) (3):
- 1990, 1992, 1993

=== Current players ===
As of the 2008-09 season:

- Adamopoulos
- Alexandropoulos
- Anastasopoulos
- Andreopoulos
- Anestopoulos
- Assimakopoulos
- Athanassopoulos
- Haralambos Diniotis
- Ilias Diniotis
- Giannis
- Giannakopoulos
- Varouchas Hatzipanagiotis
- Kollias
- Korbis
- Mantzavinos
- Mouhikas
- Nikolopoulos
- Panagiotakopoulos
- Panagiotidis
- Pinchioni
- Tsonis
- Zokos

== Basketball ==
The team plays locally in the EKASKENOP championships. In the 2007-08 season, Erani plays in the third division.
