= 1951–52 Greek Football Cup =

1951–52 Greek Cup
Tournament details
- Country: Greece
- Teams: 213

Final positions
- Champions: Olympiacos (3rd title)
- Runners-up: Panionios

Tournament statistics
- Matches played: 217
- Goals scored: 643 (2.96 per match)

The 1951–52 Greek Football Cup was the tenth edition of the Greek Football Cup. The competition culminated with the Greek Cup final, replayed at Leoforos Alexandras Stadium, on 15 June 1952, because of the first match that took place on June 1st ended as a draw. The match was contested by Olympiacos and Panionios, with Olympiacos winning by 2–0.

== Calendar ==
Round	Date(s)	Fixtures	Clubs	New entries
First Round		99	213 → 115	191
Second Round		50	115 → 67	11
Third Round		24	67 → 41	2
Fourth Round		15	41 → 26	1
Additional Round		2	26 → 24	none
Fifth Round		8	24 → 16	none
Round of 16	20 January 1952	8	16 → 8	8
Quarter-finals	10 February, 30 March 1952	6	8 → 4	none
Semi-finals	24 April 1952	3	4 → 2	none
Final	1, 15 June 1952	2	2 → 1	none

== Qualification round ==
=== First round ===
Team 1	Score/Agg.	Team 2	Match	Replay
Panelefsiniakos	2–1	Archimidis		
Panaspropyrgiakos	2–1	Aris Piraeus		
AE Karava	2–4	Doxa Piraeus		
AE Nikaia	1–0	AE Moschato		
Neapolis	0–5	AGO P. Kokkinia		
Atromitos Piraeus	4–1	Chalkidona		
Asteras Athens	5–0	Niki Ampelokipoi		
Apollon Athens	3–0	Afovos		
Eleftheroupoli	5–0	Kronos		
Fostiras	5–0	Viktoria		
AE Nea Ionia	1–0	Akratitos Petralona		
Daphni Athens	1–0	Sparta		
Esperos Kallitheas	8–1	Poseidon Glyfada		
Olympias Athens	2–3	Armeniki		
AE Chalandri	1–2	PO Psychiko		
Panerythraikos	4–0	Panexarchiakos		
AO Zografou	2–0	Giziakos	0–0	2–0
Ethnikos Asteras	4–0	Foivos Neos Kosmos		
AE Pangrati	2–0 (w/o)	Attikos		
Niki Plaka	2–0	Keramikos		
Doxa Vyronas	3–1	Kallithaikos		
Proodeftiki	3–4	Ilisiakos	2–2 (a.e.t.)	1–2 (a.e.t.)
Argonaftis Piraeus	4–2 (a.e.t.)	AE Kallithea		
AE Ampelokipoi	3–2	Filathloi Piraeus	2–2 (a.e.t.)	1–0
Athinaikos	2–0 (w/o)	Proodos Patisia		
Agios Dimitrios	Sus.^{1}	Iraklis Athens		
Aris Mytilene	5–1	Achilleus Mytilene		
Diagoras	2–0	Dorieus		
Ergotelis	1–0	Keravnos Poron Heraklion		
EGOH	1–0	Irodotos		
OFI	?	AE Katsampa Heraklion		
Iraklis Heraklion	?	Olympiacos Heraklion		
Ermis Heraklion	?	Agios Georgios Poron		
Ionia Chania	3–2	Atlantida Chania		
Talos Chania	1–0	OF Chania		
Atromitos Rethymno	0–4	Asteras Rethymno		
Keravnos Rethymno	4–1	Kritikos Chania		
Iraklis Pyrgos	1–2	AEK Pyrgos	1–1	0–1
Panetolikos	4–1	AEK Agrinio		
Panetolikos	6–1	Patreus		
Aias Gastouni	3–4	Ethnikos Pyrgos	3–3	0–1
AEK Patras^{2}	1–2	Armeniki Patras		
Panegieus	3–2	Olympiacos Aigio		
Panachaiki	1–0	Aetos Patras		
Olympiakos Patras	2–1	Aetos Rio		
Lefkos Asteras Amaliadas	2–0	Ethnikos Amaliada		
Achaiki	1–4	Asteras Patras		
Olympiacos Argostoli	?	Apollon Patras		
Thyella Patras	4–0	Iraklis Patras		
Proodeftiki Patras	2–1	Achilleus Patras		
AE Messolongi	?	Aris Aitoliko		
Ethnikos Asteras Thiva	0–1	Pallevadiaki		
Olympiacos Korinthos	3–0	Panargiakos		
Pelopas Kiato	3–0	Aris Corinth		
Iraklis Nafplio	0–1	Pannafpliakos		
Argonaftis Vrachati	11–1	AE Corinth		
Atromitos Ioannina	2–1	Averof Ioannina	0–0^{3}	2–1
Aetos Arta	?	Panamvrakikos		
Aris Kerkyra	3–0	Olympos Kerkyra		
Ellispontos	3–1^{4}	Asteras Kerkyra		
AEK Kalamata	1–2	Prasina Poulia		
Apollon Kalamata	3–1	Pamisos Messini		
Pantsechiotikos Tripolis	2–0 (w/o)	Asteras Tripolis		
Pantsechiotikos Tripolis	2–1	Atromitos Tripolis		
Spartiatikos	2–0	AEK Tripolis		
Olympiacos Lamia	4–1	Iraklis Lamia		
Olympiacos Volos	4–0	Aris Larissa		
Niki Volos	1–2	Pagasitikos Volos		
Iraklis Larissa	4–2	Larisaikos		
Toxotis Larissa	1–2	Ethnikos Volos		
Anagennisi Karditsa	4–2	AE Trikala		
PO Trikala	3–0	Anagennisi Karditsa		
Olympos Katerini	5–2	Megas Alexandros Katerini		
Olympos Katerini	3–0	AE Ampelokipoi Thessaloniki		
Vermion Veria	?	Εrmis Veria		
Ethnikos Edessa	2–1	Aris Edessa		
Ethnikos Edessa	?	Iraklis Edessa		
Anagennisi Giannitsa	1–3^{5}	Thermaikos		
Hellas Florina	2–0	Megas Alexandros Florina		
PO Xirokrini	0–3	Akrites Sykeon		
Aris	6–0	Meliteus		
Megas Alexandros	1–0	Apollon Kalamarias		
PAE Dioikitirio	?	AE Charilaou		
MENT	?	AE Neapolis		
Apollon Serres	4–1	Orfeas Serres		
Ethnikos Sidirokastro	?	Megas Alexandros Irakleia		
Iraklis Serres	?	Megas Alexandros Chrysou		
Iraklis Kavala	6–0	Neapolis Kavala		
Filippoi Kavala	3–2	Vyron Kavala		
Aris Drama	6–1	Iraklis Prosotsani		
Doxa Drama	6–0	AE Kyrgion		
AEK Kavala	1–0	Ethnikos Asteras Kallifitou Drama		
Elpida Drama	?	Aris Zygos		
Aspida Xanthi	?	Doxa Xanthi		
Orfeas Xanthi	?	Olympiacos Xanthi		
Orfeas Komotini	?	Rodopi Komotini		
AE Komotini	0–2 (w/o)	Thrakikos Komotini		
Ethnikos Alexandroupoli	?	Doxa Alexandroupoli		

^{1}Suspended. Both teams were zeroed.

^{2}AEK Patras were also qualified to the third round.

^{3}Suspended due to rainfall.

^{4}Ellispontos were zeroed.

^{5}Suspended at the 80th minute due to incidents. That remained as the final score.

=== Second round ===
Team 1	Score/Agg.	Team 2	Match	Replay
Apollon Athens	5–1	Niki Plaka		
Asteras Athens	4–0	Armeniki		
Fostiras	2–0	AE Nea Ionia		
Esperos Kallitheas	1–0	Ilisiakos		
Panerythraikos	1–0	PO Psychiko		
AO Zografou	2–3	AE Ampelokipoi		
AE Pangrati	4–2	Eleftheroupoli		
Doxa Vyronas	1–3 (a.e.t.)	Ethnikos Asteras		
Doxa Piraeus	3–1	Atromitos Piraeus		
Panaspropyrgiakos	3–4	Daphni Athens	2–2	1–2
Panelefsiniakos	2–1	Argonaftis Piraeus		
Aias Salamina	3–1	Athinaikos		
Pallesviakos	2–3	Aris Mytilene		
Panegieus	4–1	Armeniki Patras		
Panetolikos	0–1	AE Messolongi		
Asteras Patras	2–0	Proodeftiki Patras		
Olympiakos Patras	3–5	Thyella Patras		
Panachaiki	0–1	Apollon Patras		
Lefkos Asteras Amaliadas	?	Apollon Pyrgos		
AEK Pyrgos	0–2	Ethnikos Pyrgos		
Atromitos Ioannina	2–0	Aetos Arta		
Aris Kerkyra	4–1	Asteras Kerkyra		
Talos Chania	1–0	Asteras Rethymno		
Keravnos Rethymno	2–1	Ionia Chania		
Iraklis Heraklion	4–3	Ermis Heraklion		
Ergotelis	2–1	EGOH		
Apollon Kalamata	4–1	Prasina Poulia		
Pantsechiotikos Tripolis	2–0	Spartiatikos		
Olympiacos Korinthos	?	Pannafpliakos		
Pelopas Kiato	?^{6}	Olympiacos Loutraki	?	?
Pallamiaki	1–2	Olympiacos Lamia		
Pallevadiaki	4–1	AEK Chalkida		
Enosis Chalkida	1–1	AE Orchomenos		
Iraklis Larissa	0–1	Olympiacos Volos		
Ethnikos Volos	3–1	Kentavros Volos		
PO Trikala	3–0	Pagasitikos Volos		
Aris	2–1	PAE Dioikitirio		
Megas Alexandros	1–0	Thermaikos		
Ermis Veria	?	MENT		
Ethnikos Edessa	?	Olympiacos Naousa		
Hellas Florina	2–1^{7}	Akrites Sykeon		
Iraklis Serres	2–1	Apollon Serres		
Filippoi Kavala	3–2	AEK Kavala		
Iraklis Kavala	1–3	Doxa Drama		
Aris Drama	?	Elpida Drama		
Ethnikos Alexandroupoli	2–2^{8}	Tourkiki Neolea Komotini		
Aspida Xanthi	0–1^{9}	Orfeas Xanthi		
Orfeas Komotini	3–1	Thrakikos Komotini		

^{6} Pelopas Kiato were qualified on a draw after two ties.

^{7} Hellas Florina were zeroed.

^{8} Suspended at the second half.

^{9} Orfeas Xanthi were zeroed.

=== Third round ===
Team 1	Score/Agg.	Team 2	Match	Replay
Ethnikos Asteras	2–1	AE Pangrati		
Asteras Athens	3–0	Panerythraikos		
Apollon Athens	2–0 (w/o)	AE Ampelokipoi		
Panelefsiniakos	2–1	Doxa Piraeus		
AE Nikaia	2–3	AGO P. Kokkinia		
Fostiras	0–2	Esperos Kallitheas		
Apollon Kalamata	3–0	Pantsechiotikos Tripolis		
Olympiacos Korinthos	2–0 (w/o)	Argonaftis Vrachati		
OFI	?	Iraklis Heraklion		
Keravnos Rethymno	2–0	Talos Chania		
Aris Mytilene	4–9	Aias Salamina		
Hellas Syros	2–0 (w/o)	Aris Syros		
Olympiacos Lamia	2–0	Pallevadiaki		
Ethnikos Volos	0–1	Olympiacos Volos		
Atromitos Ioannina	2–0	Aris Kerkyra		
Panegieus	1–0	Apollon Patras		
Ethnikos Pyrgos	0–1	Lefkos Asteras Amaliadas		
AE Messolongi	0–1	Asteras Patras		
Thyella Patras	?	AEK Patras		
Aris	1–0	Ermis Veria		
Akrites Sykeon	0–1	Megas Alexandros	0–0	0–1
Olympos Katerini	3–0	Ethnikos Edessa		
Elpida Drama	0–2	Doxa Drama		
Filippoi Kavala	3–2	Orfeas Komotini		
Aspida Xanthi	3–0	Ethnikos Alexandroupoli		
Iraklis Serres	3–0	Ethnikos Sidirokastro		

=== Fourth round ===
Team 1	Score/Agg.	Team 2	Match	Replay
Ethnikos Asteras	2–0 (w/o)	Diagoras		
Esperos Kallitheas	1–0	Asteras Athens		
Apollon Athens	6–2	Daphni Athens		
Aias Salamina	3–1	AGO P. Kokkinia		
Hellas Syros	1–0	Panelefsiniakos		
Ergotelis	1–2 (a.e.t.)	OFI		
Atromitos Ioannina	2–4	Thyella Patras	1–1	1–3
Panegieus	3–3^{10}	Asteras Patras	2–2	1–1
Olympiacos Korinthos	?	Pelopas Kiato		
Apollon Kalamata	2–0 (w/o)	Lefkos Asteras Amaliadas		
Olympiacos Lamia	?	Pagasitikos Volos		
Iraklis Serres	?	Megas Alexandros		
Aspida Xanthi	?	Filippoi Kavala		
Aris	6–0	Olympos Katerini		
Doxa Drama	9–0	Iraklis Andriani		

^{10} Panegieus qualified on a draw after two ties.

=== Additional round ===
Team 1	Score	Team 2
Apollon Kalamata	3–2 (a.e.t.)	Olympiacos Korinthos
Panegieus	1–2	Thyella Patras

=== Fifth round ===
Team 1	Score	Team 2
Apollon Kalamata	1–0	Thyella Patras
Apollon Athens	3–2	Ethnikos Asteras
Enosis Chalkida	0–1	Esperos Kallitheas
Aias Salamina	5–1	Hellas Syros
OFI	1–3	Keravnos Rethymno
Olympiacos Volos	0–1^{11}	Pagasitikos Volos
Aris	2–1	Megas Alexandros
Aspida Xanthi	1–4	Doxa Drama

^{11} Suspended due to incidents.

== Knockout phase ==
In the knockout phase, teams play against each other over a single match. If the match ends up as a draw, extra time will be played and if the match remains a draw a replay match is set at the home of the guest team which the extra time rule stands as well. If a winner doesn't occur after the replay match the winner emerges by a flip of a coin.
The mechanism of the draws for each round is as follows:

- In the draw for the round of 16, the eight top teams of each association are seeded and the eight clubs that passed the qualification round are unseeded.
  The seeded teams are drawn against the unseeded teams.
- In the draws for the quarter-finals onwards, there are no seedings, and teams from the same group can be drawn against each other.

== Bracket ==
Round of 16
Keravnos Rethymno	0
AEK Athens	6
Panathinaikos	2
Esperos Kallitheas	0
Pagasitikos Volos	3
Makedonikos	2
Apollon Kalamata	0
Olympiacos	7
Doxa Drama (a.e.t.)	3
Iraklis	1
Aris	1
PAOK	0
Ethnikos Piraeus	2
Aias Salamina	0
Apollon Athens	1
Panionios	2

Quarter-finals
AEK Athens (a.e.t.)	1	0
Panathinaikos	1	0
Pagasatikos Volos	1
Olympiacos	3
Doxa Drama	3
Aris	2
Ethnikos Piraeus	2	2
Panionios	2	3

Semi-finals
AEK Athens	0
Olympiacos	2
Doxa Drama	2	1
Panionios	2	2

Final
Olympiacos	2	2
Panionios	2	0

== Round of 16 ==
Team 1	Score	Team 2
Panathinaikos	2–0	Esperos Kallitheas
Ethnikos Piraeus	2–0	Aias Salamina
Apollon Kalamata	0–7	Olympiacos
Aris	1–0	PAOK
Apollon Athens	1–2	Panionios
Keravnos Rethymno	0–6	AEK Athens
Pagasitikos Volos	3–2	Makedonikos
Doxa Drama	3–1 (a.e.t.)	Iraklis

== Quarter-finals ==
Team 1	Score/Agg.	Team 2	Match	Replay
AEK Athens^{12}	1–1	Panathinaikos	1–1 (a.e.t.)	0–0 (a.e.t.)
Ethnikos Piraeus	4–5	Panionios	2–2 (a.e.t.)	2–3
Doxa Drama	3–2	Aris		
Pagasatikos Volos	1–3	Olympiacos		

^{12}AEK Athens won by flip of a coin.

== Semi-finals ==
Team 1	Score/Agg.	Team 2	Match	Replay
AEK Athens	0–2	Olympiacos		
Doxa Drama	3–4	Panionios	2–2 (a.e.t.)	1–2

== Final ==
1 June 1952
17:00 EET

Olympiacos	2–2 (a.e.t.)	Panionios
Kopanidis 30'; Drosos 90'	Report (page 1)	Tsolias 34', 60'

Leoforos Alexandras Stadium, Ampelokipoi
Attendance: 15,000
Referee: Sotiris Asprogerakas (Athens)

=== Replay match ===
15 June 1952

Olympiacos	2–0	Panionios
Darivas 5'; Kansos 68'	Report (pages 1,2)

Leoforos Alexandras Stadium, Ampelokipoi
Attendance: 15,000
Referee: Konstantinos Gikopoulos (Thessaloniki)
