= 1951 Greek Football Cup final =

1951 Greek Cup final
- Event: 1950–51 Greek Football Cup
Olympiacos	PAOK
4	0
- Date: 11 March 1951
- Venue: Leoforos Alexandras Stadium, Ampelokipoi, Athens
- Referee: Sotiris Asprogerakas (Athens)
- Attendance: 15,000

The 1951 Greek Cup final was the 9th final of the Greek Cup. The match took place on 11 March 1951 at Leoforos Alexandras Stadium. The contesting teams were Olympiacos and PAOK. It was Olympiacos' second Greek Cup final in their 26 years of existence and PAOK's second Greek Cup final in their 25-year history. Before start of the match the crowd "froze" in the presence of two men entering the pitch. One was dressed as Adolf Hitler and the other as his bodyguard. The misunderstanding ended quickly with the first explaining that he was in fact a fan of PAOK and he was dressed up for the Carnival that was not over at the time.

== Venue ==
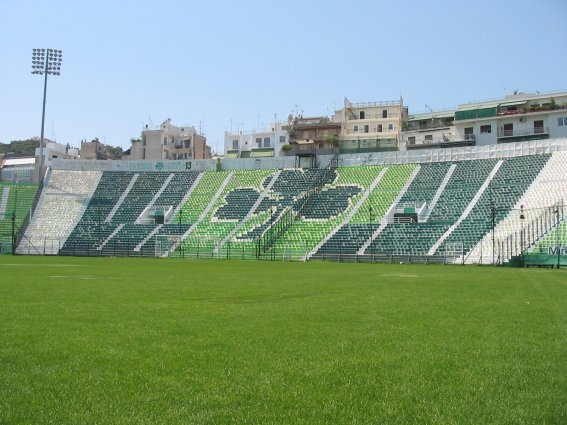
Leoforos Alexandras Stadium.

This was the eighth Greek Cup final held at Leoforos Alexandras Stadium, after the 1932, 1939, 1940, 1947, 1948, 1949 and 1950 finals. (Leoforos also hosted the replay match of the 1933 final between Ethnikos Piraeus and Aris and the replay match of the 1949 final between AEK Athens and Panathinaikos).

Leoforos Alexandras Stadium was built in 1922. The stadium is used as a venue for Panathinaikos and Greece. Its current capacity is 30,000.

== Background ==
Olympiacos had reached the Greek Cup final once in 1947, where they had won Iraklis 5–0.

PAOK had reached the Greek Cup final once in 1939, where they had lost to AEK Athens by 2–1.

The two teams had never met each other in a Cup final.

== Route to the final ==
Olympiacos				Round	PAOK			
Opponent	Agg.	1st leg	2nd leg		Opponent	Agg.	1st leg	2nd leg
Panionios	3–0	0–0 (a.e.t.) (H)	3–0 (A)	Round of 16	Elpida Drama	4–3 (A)		
Makedonikos	6–2 (H)			Quarter-finals	Aris	4–2 (a.e.t.) (H)		
Asteras Athens	3–1 (H)			Semi-finals	Panathinaikos	1–0 (H)		

== Match ==
=== Details ===
11 March 1951
17:00 EET

Olympiacos	4–0	PAOK
Mouratis 27'; Darivas 66'; Drosos 75', 80'	Report

Leoforos Alexandras Stadium, Athens
Attendance: 15,000
Referee: Sotiris Asprogerakas (Athens)

GK	(Greece) Stelios Kourouklatos
DF	(Greece) Ilias Rosidis
DF	(Greece) Gerasimos Germenis
DF	(Greece) Andreas Mouratis
MF	(Greece) Dionysis Minardos (c)
MF	(Greece) Babis Kotridis
MF	(Greece) Nikos Vasiliou
FW	(Greece) Georgios Darivas
FW	(Greece) Stelios Christopoulos
FW	(Greece) Thanasis Bebis
FW	(Greece) Babis Drosos
Manager:
(Greece) Giannis Chelmis, (Greece) Vangelis Chelmis

GK	(Greece) Alexandros Lykaris
DF	(Greece) Vasilis Patakas
DF	(Greece) Nikos Golemis
DF	(Greece) Sofoklis Arvanitis
MF	(Greece) Giorgos Gogos
MF	(Greece) Giannis Psomas
MF	(Greece) Giannis Vasiliadis
FW	(Greece) Giorgos Mouratidis
FW	(Greece) Anestis Tzinopoulos
FW	(Greece) Lefteris Papadakis (c)
FW	(Greece) Vasilis Emmanouilidis
Manager:
(Austria) Wilhelm Sevcik

Assistant referees:
Sotiropoulos
Vrachas

Match rules

- 90 minutes
- 30 minutes of extra time if necessary
- Replay match if scores still level

== See also ==
- 1950–51 Greek Football Cup
