= Paulo Bunze =

Angolan-Portuguese footballer

Personal information
- Full name: Paulo Cezár Dos Santos Bunze
- Date of birth: 19 July 1988 (age 38)
- Height: 1.81 m (5 ft 11 in)
- Position: Forward

Senior career*
Years	Team	Apps	(Gls)
2009	Waltham Forest		
2013	FC Jūrmala	6	(0)
- Michigan Stars FC
- Apollon Kalamata
- PAS Korinthos
–2016	Apollon Kalamata		
2016	AE Pellanas Kastoriou	13	(4)
2017/2018–	Zwekapin United FC		(1)
- * Club domestic league appearances and goals

Paulo Cezár Dos Santos Bunze (Greek: Σάντος Πάολο born 19 July 1988) is an Angolan-Portuguese professional footballer who is under contract to Zwekapin United of the Myanmar National League. He is able to represent Angola internationally and plays as a midfielder. Besides Portugal, he has played in England, Latvia, Greece and Myanmar.

== Career ==
=== Latvia ===
One of Jurmala's new imports for 2013, Bunze claimed that the gameplay there was more bellicose and less technical.

=== Greece ===
Impressing Apollon Kalamata in January 2016, his previous club PAS Korinthos disputed Apollon's transfer claim of the Angolan-Portuguese attacker, explaining that he was still representing them in competitions. Eventually, Bunze became part of Apollon, picking up a three-match suspension in March before joining AE Pellanas Kastoriou succeeding a failed deal with Tsiklitiras Pylos.
