= Nikos Pentzaropoulos =

Greek footballer and manager (1927–1979)

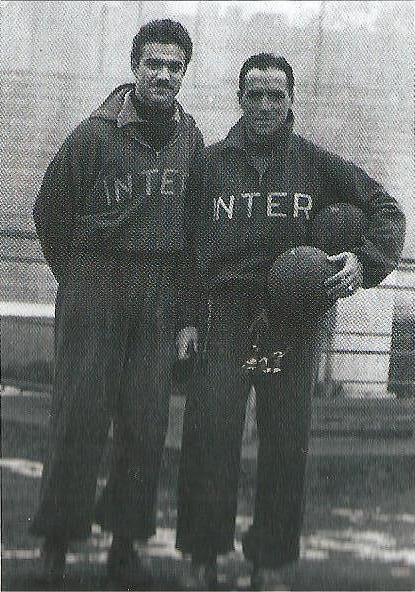
- Nikos Pentzaropoulos (left) and Alfredo Foni with the uniform of Internazionale

Personal information
- Full name: Nikolaos Pentzaropoulos
- Date of birth: 17 January 1927
- Place of birth: Kallithea, Athens, Greece
- Date of death: 29 March 1979 (aged 52)
- Place of death: Kallithea, Athens, Greece
- Position: Goalkeeper

Youth career
- 1940–1943: Keravnos Kallithea

Senior career*
| Years | Team | Apps | (Gls) |
| 1943–1952 | Panionios | | |
| 1952–1953 | Internazionale | 0 | (0) |
| 1953–1955 | Panionios | | |

International career
| 1948–1952 | Greece | 11 | (0) |
| 1952 | Greece Olympic | 1 | (0) |

Managerial career
- 1957: Panionios
- 1969–1970: Acharnaikos
- 1970: Ilioupolis
- 1974–1975: Panionios
- 1978: Panionios (interim)
- * Club domestic league appearances and goals

Nikos Pentzaropoulos (Greek: Νίκος Πεντζαρόπουλος; 17 January 1927 – 29 March 1979) was a Greek footballer, who played as a goalkeeper, mainly for Panionios. He earned the nickname "the Hero of Tampere" (Greek: ο Ήρωας του Τάμπερε), after his performance with the Greek Olympic team in 1952.

== Club career ==
=== Early years and distinction ===
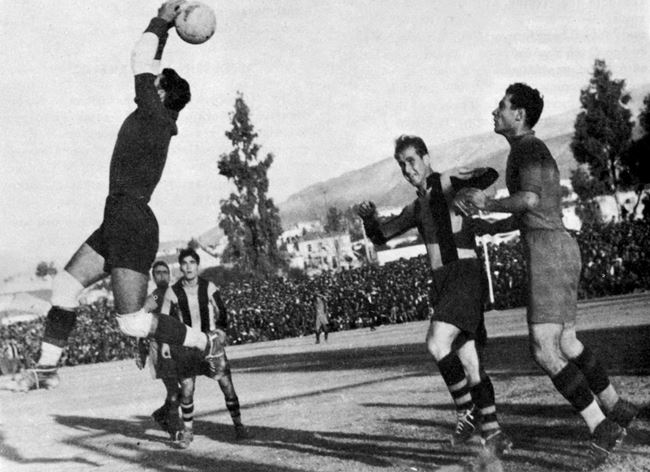
Pentzaropoulos in a match against AEK Athens in 1949

Pentzaropoulos began playing football in 1940 at the local club, Keravnos Kallithea. In 1943, at the age of 16, he was discovered by the goalkeeping coach of Panionios, Giorgos Roussopoulos, who quickly realized his potential and brought him to the club. He was quickly established in the senior team from a young age and in 1948 he became an international with Greece for the first time. During his spell at the club they won their first and only AFCA league title in 1951. The following season they also reached the final, where they lost to Olympiacos in a replay match as they first match ended in a draw.

He was distinguished for his exceptional reflexes, his ability to save the ball and his ability to save penalty kicks. In a match at Karaiskakis Stadium against Olympiacos, Pentzaropoulos kicked the ball from the keeper's box but, due to the strong wind, the ball fell towards the middle of the pitch. Andreas Mouratis of Olympiacos, who was renowned for his strong shots, unleashed a powerful shot sending the ball towards the goal post of Panionios. On the 6-yard-line, as the ball was passing over him, Pentzaropoulos jumped into the air, turned his body 180 degrees, stretched and punched the ball to safety, falling into the nets. The crowd was cheering for him for his stunning save and Mouratis ran to him, helped him get up and kissed him.

=== Internazionale ===
His performances against Denmark at the 1952 Olympics did not go unnoticed, as the manager of Internazionale, Alfredo Foni, who was at the stadium was impressed and suggested him to sign a professional contract at the Italian club. Since Greek football was amateur at the time and the footballers had little or no income at all, the professionalism and the exceptionally high wage that was suggested by Inter impressed him, since he was not from a wealthy family and he barely made his living. The dream of a professional career in a European top club made him depart for Milan in August 1952. He signed a professional contract with Inter and started training with the Italian club, hoping that the administration of Panionios would consent for the transfer. During his time at the Nerazzurri also, he also competed in friendly matches, where he impressed with his performances. Indicative of the Italians' adulation for his figure, was an article of an Italian newspaper with a big picture, which was portrayed Pentzaropoulos, blocking the ball high in the air, with the title of the article being "The flying goalkeeper" with the caption "Pentzaropoulos can fly...". However, his unexpected departure was negatively handled by the administration of Panionios who didn't give in to the financial exchanges that the Italians were offering. The transfer that he desired never materialized, despite staying for almost a whole year in Italy.

=== Return to Panionios ===
Pentzaropoulos returned to Greece, disappointed and embittered in 1953. He was welcomed at the Larissa railway station and after a while he came back to action with Panionios. However, his performances didn't resemble his previous impressive form that gave him the nickname "the flying goalkeeper" and his disappointment was such that he retired from football at the age of only 28.

== International career ==
Pentzaropoulos had a total of 11 games with Greece, while he also competed in 3 friendly matches against Turkey with an Athens Mixed Team. He made his debut on 28 November 1948, in a friendly match against Turkey, entering as a substitute in the second half with his team losing 1–2 and the score remained as it was until the end of the match. From 1949 to 1952 Pentzaropoulos played 8 matches, all of which were for the Mediterranean Cup against Egypt (1–3), Italy B (2–3, 0–3), France B (0–1), Syria (8–0) and Turkey (1–2, 3–1, 1–0).

Afterwards, he became a member of the Olympic team in 1952 Summer Olympics at Helsinki, where he made his greatest performance in Tampere. On 15 July 1952, in the match against the Denmark, at the presence of 7,000 spectators Pentzaropoulos made the greatest game of his career, making numerous saves against the hammering shots of the Danish footballers. Eventually the match ended in a 1–2 defeat and Greece were eliminated, but Pentzaropoulos was cheered by the crowd. He was called the "Hero of Tampere" from the Greek journalists who were constantly posting glowing articles dedicated to him, while the international press was accordingly encomiastic, with many European newspapers publishing articles with the title "The New Zamora was born", comparing him, with the greatest goalkeeper at the time. His last international match was on 25 July 1952, after their elimination from the tournament, against Great Britain which ended in a 4–2 win.

== Managerial career ==
In his later years, Pentzaropoulos enacted with coaching and after that he coached the youth team of Panionios. He also served as the manager of the men's team in 1957, 1974 and 1978. On 11 August 1969 he was hired at Acharnaikos. On 28 July 1970 he took charge of the bench of Ilioupolis.

== Personal life and death ==
Pentzaropoulos had a wife named Vasiliki and a daughter named Eirini. He envisioned the establishment of a goalkeeping school. In a short time before his death, Pentzaropoulos taught his secrets to the young Antonis Manikas, who a few years later praised his former mentor after saving 15 penalties in 3 years, becoming an international. He died on 29 March 1979, at the age of only 52 from cancer, failing to witness Panionios conquering the Greek Cup, a few months later. The news of his death spread throughout the country and the sports press was showing long time features.

== Honours ==
Panionios

- Athens FCA Championship: 1951
