= Panagiotis Bachramis =

Greek footballer (1976–2010)

Personal information
- Full name: Panagiotis Bachramis
- Date of birth: 12 March 1976
- Place of birth: Kalamata, Greece
- Date of death: 13 August 2010 (aged 34)
- Place of death: Kyparissia, Greece
- Height: 1.81 m (5 ft 11 1/2 in)
- Position: Central midfielder

Youth career
- 1993–1994: Apollon Kalamata

Senior career*
Years	Team	Apps	(Gls)
1994–2001	Kalamata	123	(15)
2001–2004	Iraklis	32	(0)
2004–2008	AEL	64	(7)
2008–2010	Veria	27	(2)
Total		246	(24)

International career
1995	Greece U19	1	(0)
1996–1997	Greece U21	2	(1)
- * Club domestic league appearances and goals as of 3 August 2015 (UTC)

Panagiotis Bachramis (Greek: Παναγιώτης Μπαχράμης; 12 March 1976 – 13 August 2010) was a Greek professional footballer who played as midfielder. On 13 August 2010, he was killed when a speedboat struck him while he was snorkeling near the beach in Kyparissia.

== Career ==
Born in Kalamata, Bachramis began playing football with local side, Apollon Kalamata in the fourth division. He joined city rivals, Kalamata in 1994, the club he would play for seven seasons in the First and Second Division. In 1995, Bachramis made his debut in the first division at age 19, in a 5–0 victory over AEL.

In 2001, Bachramis signed with Iraklis, where he played until he joined AEL in 2004. He helped the club of Larissa to gain the promotion to the First Division and win the 2007 Greek Football Cup title. Bachramis also played in the 2007-08 UEFA Cup, where AEL bowed out against Blackburn Rovers F.C. He would finish his career with Veria F.C. in the Second Division, playing a total of more than 280 competitive League, Cup and European matches for his clubs.

Bachramis played with the Greece national under-21 football team, participating in the 1998 UEFA European Under-21 Football Championship qualifying rounds in 1997. Although the team qualified for the finals, he didn't manage to play because of an injury. Although he suffered from frequent injuries, he was a valuable player for all the teams he played for, as he was fast, calm, collective, cooperative and could play in many positions in the pitch covering any gap. It is a characteristic that Bachramis had even played as a goalkeeper(!) in a match with AEL. This happened on 12 April 2006, in the Alcazar Stadium, in the rematch for the semi-finals of the Greek Cup against Olympiacos. At 90', and while all three changes have been made, the regular goalkeeper Stefanos Kotsolis withdrew injured and Bachramis took his position under the goalpost.

== Statistics ==
Points (as of 2009): 268 matches

- First Division: 162
- Second Division: 69
- Greek Cup: 33
- Greek Super Cup: 1
- Intertoto: 1
- UEFA Cup: 2

Goals (as of 2009): 29

- First Division: 14
- Beta Ethniki: 9
- Greek Cup: 6

== Clubs ==
Years	Clubs	Points	Goals
1993–94	(Greece) Apollon Kalamata	(D)	
1994–95	(Greece) Kalamata	14 (B) + 2 (Cup)	0
1995–96	(Greece) Kalamata	18 (A) + 2 (Cup)	1 (Α) + 1 (Cup)
1996–97	(Greece) Kalamata	17 (A) + 2 (Cup)	2 (A)
1997–98	(Greece) Kalamata	19 (A)	2 (A)
1998–99	(Greece) Kalamata	22 ('B) + 4 (Cup)	4 (B) + 2 (Cup)
1999–2000	(Greece) Kalamata	16 (A) + 4 (Cup)	2 (A) + 2 (Cup)
2000–01	(Greece) Kalamata	17 (A) + 2 (Cup)	4 (A)
2001–02	(Greece) Iraklis	13 (A) + 6 (Cup)	0
2002–03	(Greece) Iraklis	14 (A)	0
2003–04	(Greece) Iraklis	5 (A) + 3 (Cup)	0 (A) + 1 (Cup)
2004–05	(Greece) AEL	21 (B) + 3 (Cup)	4 (B)
2005–06	(Greece) AEL	26 (A) + 4 (Cup)	3 (A)
2006–07	(Greece) AEL	6 (A) + 0 (Cup) + 1 (I)	0
2007–08	(Greece) AEL	11 (A) + 2 (Cup) +1 (SC) + 2 (UEFA)	0
2008–09	(Greece) Veria	12 (B) +1 (Cup)	1 (B)
2009–10	(Greece) Veria	9 (C)	1 (C)
Years	National teams	Points	Goals
(;)-1995	Greece U19 team		
1996–1997	Greece U21 team	2	1

- Abbreviations:
  - A or 1st: matches and goals in the First Division
  - B or 2nd: matches and goals in the Second Division
  - C or 3rd: matches and goals in the Third Division
  - D or 4th: matches and goals in the Fourth Division
  - Cup matches and goals in the Greek Cup
  - SC matches and goals in the Super Cup
  - I matches and goals in Intertoto

== Honours ==
AEL

- Greek Cup: 2006–07
