= Nikos Liberopoulos =

Greek footballer (born 1975)

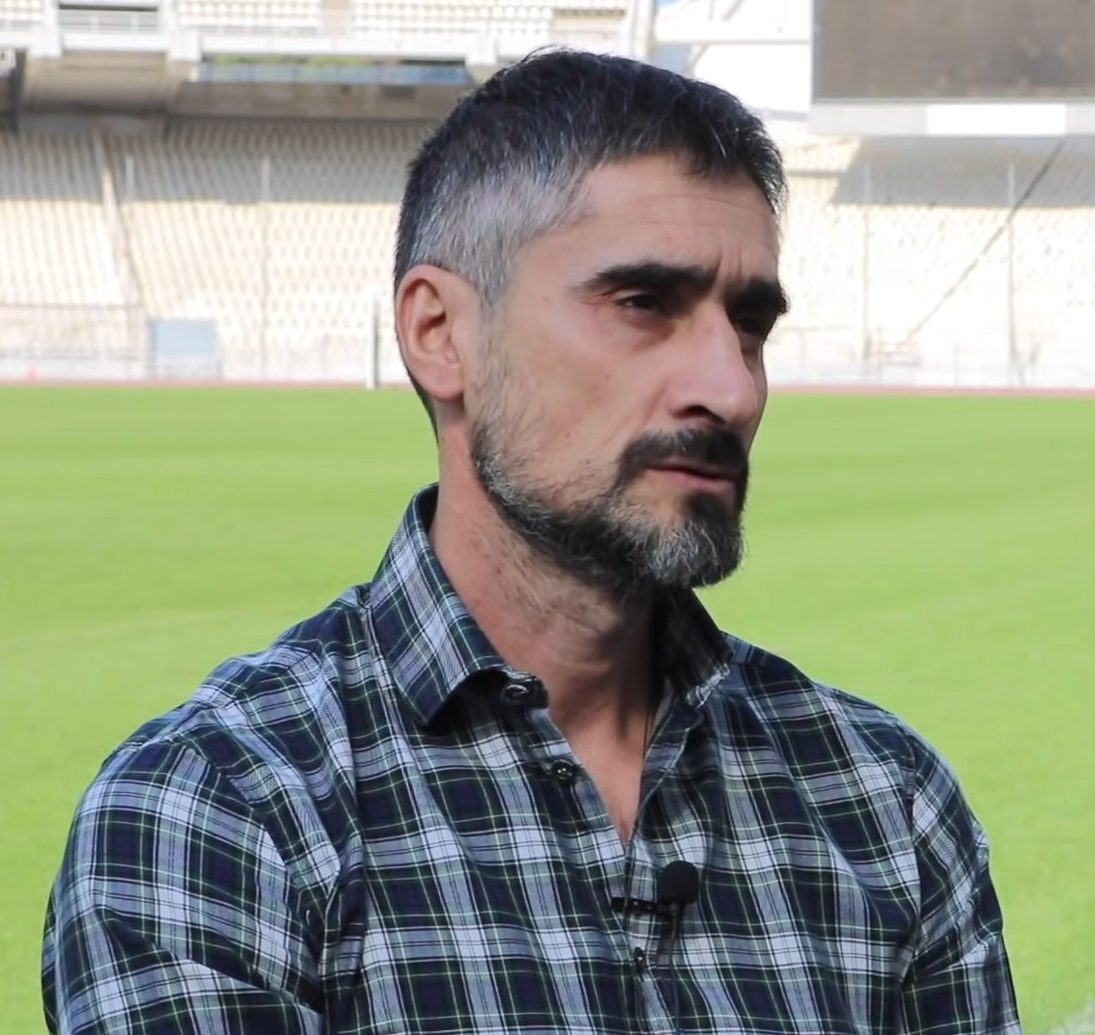
- Liberopoulos in 2020

Personal information
- Full name: Nikolaos Liberopoulos
- Date of birth: 4 August 1975 (age 51)
- Place of birth: Filiatra, Greece
- Height: 1.87 m (6 ft 2 in)
- Positions: Forward; attacking midfielder

Youth career
- 1988–1991: Niki Platis

Senior career*
Years	Team	Apps	(Gls)
1991–1993	Erani Filiatra	53	(33)
1993–1996	Kalamata	78	(20)
1996–2003	Panathinaikos	185	(72)
2003–2008	AEK Athens	142	(66)
2008–2010	Eintracht Frankfurt	50	(10)
2010–2012	AEK Athens	53	(18)
Total		561	(219)

International career
1996–1998	Greece U21	23	(15)
1996–2012	Greece	76	(13)
1997	Greece military		
Medal record
Men's football
Representing Greece
World Military Cup
Winner	1997
UEFA European U-21 Championship
Runner-up	1998
- * Club domestic league appearances and goals

Nikos Liberopoulos (Greek: Νίκος Λυμπερόπουλος; born on 4 August 1975) is a retired Greek former international footballer who played as a forward. He is famous for his aim-to-goal shot, his innate in-play instincts, and his technical attacking skills. Liberopoulos is a unique player in Greek domestic football, as he is equally adored by fans of both AEK Athens and Panathinaikos. He is the only player to be recorded in the top ten scorers of all time for both these teams. Indeed, after seven seasons at Panathinaikos Liberopoulos scored 103 goals. On 10 May 2012, he reached a milestone 100 goals for AEK Athens after a brace against Atromitos, making him the only player in history to score a hundred goals for both Athens clubs (NOTE: this contradicts the tabulated data below, which gives 101 goals for AEK Athens and 87 goals for Panathinaikos. The latter is also in disagreement with data on the Elite Football website: 92 goals at AEK Athens and 76 goals at Panathinaikos). On 8 September 2017, he became the Technical Director of AEK.

== Club career ==
=== Early years ===
Liberopoulos started his professional football career at the local Erani Filiatra, he then moved to Kalamata in 1994. After an impressive debut season in Greece's top division, AEK Athens and Olympiacos tried to sign him during the summer of 1996 yet Panathinaikos managed to snap him up.

=== Panathinaikos ===
In summer 1996, Liberopoulos signed for Panathinaikos. With them he reached the semi-final stage of the UEFA Champions League. Italian clubs, mainly Juventus and Hellas Verona showed interest in hiring him, but his loyalty to Panathinaikos kept him in Athens. In 2003, Liberopoulos clashed with Panathinaikos' board which eventually led to him leaving the club.

=== AEK Athens ===
Following his departure from Panathinaikos he was ready to join Sochaux, but on 31 July 2003 Liberopoulos signed for AEK Athens. He went to score several times against his former team but never celebrated earning the fans' applause and a standing ovation for his action. He helped AEK Athens scoring 79 times in his 195 appearances and earning a top scorer award during the 2006–07 season. His most important goals originated from two long range shots, one in a 1–0 win against Lille and another in a 4–0 with against Olympiacos. During June 2007, Liberopoulos was offered a lucrative contract with 1. FC Nürnberg worth 4 million euros, which he declined to remain with AEK Athens. Club president, Demis Nikolaidis had publicly announced his intent to retain Liberopoulos at all costs in an effort to bolster AEK Athens' chances at achieving dominance in the Greek Super League. On 7 July 2008, Liberopoulos was released by AEK. German team Eintracht Frankfurt announced his signing on 13 July 2008.

=== Eintracht Frankfurt ===
On 13 July, Liberopoulos signed a two-year deal for Eintracht Frankfurt and was given the number 10 shirt. He made his Bundesliga debut, playing the full 90 minutes against Hertha BSC on 17 August 2008 at the Commerzbank-Arena in Frankfurt. Liberopoulos scored his first goal against Mainz 05. He won 55 caps scoring 13 goals in all competitions.

=== Return to AEK Athens ===
In the summer of 2010 Liberopoulos returned to Greece and AEK Athens. He put in an impressive display in AEK's 5–3 win against Australian A-League club Sydney FC on 25 July 2010, scoring one goal and setting up two others. Liberopoulos also scored against Blackburn three days later. He made his league debut against Kerkyra and scored his first official goal in a UEFA Europa League match against Hajduk Split. On 19 January 2010, in a Greek Cup match against Panathinaikos he scored two goals leading his team to victory. Liberopoulos was applauded during his substitution later in that game by some of Panathinaikos' fans despite their team's defeat. After the match Liberopoulos said "I have spent seven nice years in Panathinaikos in which I matured as a player. I keep only the positive things, but now for me AEK is my family and I will do everything for the team." and about the Panathinaikos' fans ovation "It means a lot to me. It's a great feeling to be applauded during your substitution. There were some hoots also but even if the whole stadium was hooting at me that would not have changed what I have said earlier about my feelings for Panathinaikos". On 30 May 2011, Liberopulos won his first trophy in his career with AEK, winning the Greek Cup in 2011 against Atromitos 3–0 while also scoring the first goal and was awarded MVP of the match.

On 16 June 2011, Liberopoulos signed a new one-year deal keeping him at the club until 2012. His teammate Traianos Dellas decided to stay for one year at AEK as well, in order to stop his professional career with Liberopoulos. On 20 May 2012, he played his last match with AEK against Panathinaikos. A lot of Panathinaikos and AEK fans respected him with a standing ovation when he was exiting the stadium.

== International career ==
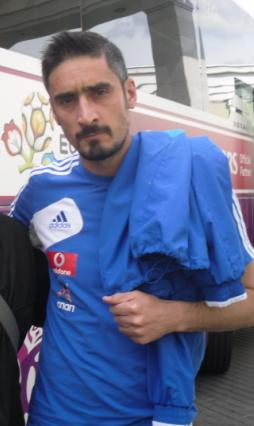
Liberopoulos in 2012

Liberopoulos played for Greece U21 from 1996 to 1998, where in 23 he scored 15 becoming their top scorer. He was also a key member of the team that took part in the final of the European Championship in 1998, where they lost to Spain.

In 1997 he was called to the military team, where he won the World Military Cup of the same year, scoring in the final against Italy.

Liberopoulos appeared 76 times in total for Greece scoring 13 goals in the process. His most notable performance in the Euro 2008 qualifiers to date was a last-second goal five minutes into stoppage time to grant Greece a 2–1 victory over Moldova on 6 June 2007, which placed Greece at the top of their qualifying division. Liberopoulos has been known on the international scene as a "super sub", coming off the bench many times in the final quarter of games and scoring the decisive goal.

He was a member of the 23-man squad formed by coach Otto Rehhagel for UEFA Euro 2008.

On 11 September 2009, Liberopoulos announced his retirement from international football, But he returned to the national squad about a year later when he was recalled by the new coach Fernando Santos.

He was also called for UEFA Euro 2012 by the coach Fernando Santos. Liberopoulos announced his retirement from international football after Greece lost to German 4–2 in the Euro 2012 quarter finals on 22 June 2012.

== Personal life ==
His cousin Sotiris was also a professional footballer.

== Career statistics ==
=== Club ===
Appearances and goals by club, season and competition
Club	Season	League			Cup		Europe		Other		Total	
Club	Season	Division	Apps	Goals	Apps	Goals	Apps	Goals	Apps	Goals	Apps	Goals
Erani Filiatra	1991–93	Delta Ethniki	53	33	0	0	–		–		53	33
Kalamata	1993–94	Beta Ethniki	21	5	2	0	0	0	–		23	5
Kalamata	1994–95	Beta Ethniki	27	4	4	2	0	0	–		31	6
Kalamata	1995–96	Alpha Ethniki	30	11	4	2	0	0	–		34	13
Kalamata	Total		78	20	10	4	0	0	0	0	88	24
Panathinaikos	1996–97	Alpha Ethniki	32	7	6	2	3	2	–		38	9
Panathinaikos	1997–98	Alpha Ethniki	27	2	4	1	0	0	–		31	3
Panathinaikos	1998–99	Alpha Ethniki	31	13	5	2	8	3	–		36	15
Panathinaikos	1999–00	Alpha Ethniki	26	23	4	3	5	1	–		30	26
Panathinaikos	2000–01	Alpha Ethniki	26	11	6	3	14	1	–		39	14
Panathinaikos	2001–02	Alpha Ethniki	17	0	3	1	10	2	–		28	2
Panathinaikos	2002–03	Alpha Ethniki	27	16	4	2	8	2	–		32	18
Panathinaikos	Total		186	72	32	14	48	11	0	0	266	97
AEK Athens	2003–04	Alpha Ethniki	27	13	7	3	6	1	–		40	17
AEK Athens	2004–05	Alpha Ethniki	28	9	9	3	6	1	–		43	13
AEK Athens	2005–06	Alpha Ethniki	27	14	5	2	2	0	–		34	16
AEK Athens	2006–07	Super League Greece	29	18	1	0	9	2	–		39	20
AEK Athens	2007–08	Super League Greece	30	13	1	0	8	0	–		39	13
AEK Athens	Total		141	67	23	8	31	4	0	0	195	79
Eintracht Frankfurt	2008–09	Bundesliga	29	9	2	1	0	0	–		31	10
Eintracht Frankfurt	2009–10	Bundesliga	21	1	3	2	0	0	–		24	3
Eintracht Frankfurt	Total		50	10	5	3	0	0	0	0	55	13
AEK Athens	2010–11	Super League Greece	22	7	6	3	5	2	1	0	34	12
AEK Athens	2011–12	Super League Greece	24	7	1	0	4	0	6	3	35	10
AEK Athens	Total		46	14	7	3	9	2	7	3	69	22
Career total			554	216	77	32	88	17	7	3	726	268

=== International ===
Appearances and goals by national team and year
National team	Year	Apps	Goals
Greece	1996	3	0
Greece	1997	0	0
Greece	1998	3	1
Greece	1999	14	4
Greece	2000	9	2
Greece	2001	7	1
Greece	2002	2	0
Greece	2003	1	0
Greece	2004	0	0
Greece	2005	4	1
Greece	2006	5	1
Greece	2007	7	2
Greece	2008	10	1
Greece	2009	2	0
Greece	2010	0	0
Greece	2011	7	0
Greece	2012	2	0
Total		76	13

Scores and results list Greece's goal tally first, score column indicates score after each Liberopoulos goal.

List of international goals scored by Nikos Liberopoulos
No.	Date	Venue	Opponent	Score	Result	Competition
1	14 October 1998	Athens Olympic Sports Complex, Athens, Greece	Georgia	2–0	3–0	2000 UEQ
2	18 August 1999	Anthi Karagianni Stadium, Kavala, Greece	El Salvador	1–0	3–1	Friendly
3	18 August 1999	Anthi Karagianni Stadium, Kavala, Greece	El Salvador	1–0	3–1	Friendly
4	18 August 1999	Anthi Karagianni Stadium, Kavala, Greece	El Salvador	3–0	3–1	Friendly
5	18 December 1999	Trikala Municipal Stadium, Trikala, Greece	Estonia	2–2	2–2	Friendly
6	3 June 2000	Stadionul Steaua (1974), Bucharest, Romania	Romania	1–2	1–2	Friendly
7	7 October 2000	Athens Olympic Sports Complex, Athens, Greece	Finland	1–0	1–0	2002 WCQ
8	14 November 2001	Municipal Stadium Kaisariani, Athens, Greece	Cyprus	1–1	1–2	Friendly
9	7 September 2005	Almaty Central Stadium, Almaty, Kazakhstan	Kazakhstan	2–1	2–1	2006 WCQ
10	2 September 2006	Zimbru Stadium, Chişinău, Moldova	Moldova	1–0	1–0	2008 UEQ
11	6 June 2007	Pankritio Stadium, Heraklion, Greece	Moldova	2–1	2–1	2008 UEQ
12	13 October 2007	Athens Olympic Sports Complex, Athens, Greece	Bosnia and Herzegovina	3–1	3–2	2008 UEQ
13	24 May 2008	Stadium Puskás Ferenc, Budapest, Hungary	Hungary	2–3	2–3	Friendly

== Honours ==
AEK Athens

- Greek Cup: 2010–11

Greece U21

- UEFA European Under-21 Championship runner-up: 1998

Individual

- Greek Young Footballer of the year: 1995–96
- Greek Footballer of the year: 1999–2000, 2005–06, 2006–07
- Greek Super League top scorer: 2002–03, 2006–07
