= Messinia Football Clubs Association =

Association football governing body in Messinia Prefecture, Greece

- Full name: Messinia Football Clubs Association; Greek: Ένωση Ποδοσφαιρικών Σωματείων Μεσσηνίας
- Short name: Messinia F.C.A.; Greek: Ε.Π.Σ. Μεσσηνίας
- Founded: 1929; 97 years ago
- Headquarters: Kalamata, Greece
- FIFA affiliation: Hellenic Football Federation
- President: Vassilios Spiliotis
- Website: epsmes.gr

Messinia Football Clubs Association (Greek: Ένωση Ποδοσφαιρικών Σωματείων Μεσσηνίας) is responsible for football in prefecture of Messenia. Its offices are housed in Kalamata and it is a member of the part of the Hellenic Football Federation.

== History ==
Its first attempt to run their own football (soccer) union in Messinia happened with the running of the council in Kalamata. In 1929, the Patras FCA asked from the Greek Football Federation not to try to run their own union as it was known that the association was part of the union.

== Information sources ==
The MFCA which is headquartered in Kalamata, the prefectural capital and the power of including of over 70 football (soccer) clubs. Basic organizations of the MFCA is the local football (soccer) championships in three divisions and the Messinia Cup in which features teams in prefectural divisions and the association-member of the MFCA enters the fourth division and its artistic honors of the prefectural association of the highest divisions, the first, the second and the third divisions.

The Messinia championships elevates into the fourth division

The Messinia Cup champions enters the Greek Cup.

The MFCA organizes championships and for children and from 2008, pro-junior 5x5. It features games with other players from the prefectures and councils the Messinia Mixed which plays with clubs from the mixed from other unions.

The MFCA features annual honors and glass rewards to the three best scorers and the three best teams with the highest points fair play from every category.

In the entire games of the divisions, the MFCA teams owes to use particularly the three players under 19, without trying to participate for only players under 19.

== League ==
=== Champions ===
Season	Champion
1930	AEK Kalamata
1931	AEK Kalamata
1932	
1933	
1934	
1935	
1936	
1937	
1938	
1939	
1940	
1941	
1942	
1943	
1944	
1945	
1946	
1947	
1948	
1949	
1950	Prasina Poulia
1951	AEK Kalamata
1952	
1953	Prasina Poulia
1954	
1955	
1956	
1957	
1958	
1959	Apollon Kalamata
1960	Apollon Kalamata
1961	Prasina Poulia
1962	Omilos Kalamata
1963	
1964	AEK Kalamata
1965	Apollon Kalamata
1966	Prasina Poulia
1967	Pammessiniakos
1968	Pamisos Messini
1969	Pamisos Messini
1970	Pamisos Messini
1971	Pamisos Messini
1972	Ethnikos Meligala
1973	Pamisos Messini
1974	Messiniakos
1975	Messiniakos
1976	Pamisos Messini
1977	Messiniakos
1978	Pamisos Messini
1979	Apollon Kalamata
1980	Messiniakos
1981	Kalamata
1982	AO Kyparissia
1983	Apollon Kalamata
1984	Pamisos Messini
1985	Messiniakos
1986	Pamisos Messini
1987	Erani Filiatra
1988	Pamisos Messini
1989	Erani Filiatra
1990	AO Messini
1991	Anagennisi Paralia
1992	Apollon Kalamata
1993	Omonoia Kalamata
1994	AE Messini / Pamisos
1995	Asteras Valyra
1996	Telos Agras Gargalianoi
1997	Apollon Kalamata
1998	Messiniakos
1999	Omonoia Kalamata
2000	AO Sperchogeia
2001	Messiniakos
2002	Erani Filiatra
2003	Apollon Petalidi
2004	Miltiadis Pyrgos Trifylia
2005	Asteras Arfara
2006	Erani Filiatra
2007	Telos Agras Gargalianoi
2008	Pamisos Messini
2009	Olympiakos Kalamata
2010	AO Kyparissia
2011	AO Sperchogeia
2012	Ethnikos Meligala
2013	Messiniakos
2014	Pamisos Messini
2015	AO Kyparissia
2016	Tsiklitiras Pylos
2017	Kalamata
2018	Pamisos Messini
2019	AO Diavolitsi
2020	Pamisos Messini
2021	Abandoned
2022	Panthouriakos
2023	Erani Filiatra
2024	Miltiadis Pyrgos Trifylia
2025	Panthouriakos
2026	Telos Agras Gargalianoi

=== Performance by club ===
Club	Titles	Season
Pamisos Messini	13	1968, 1969, 1970, 1971, 1973, 1976, 1978, 1984, 1986, 1988, 1994, 2008, 2014, 2018, 2020
Messiniakos	8	1974, 1975, 1977, 1980, 1985, 1998, 2001, 2013
Apollon Kalamata	7	1959, 1960, 1965, 1979, 1983, 1992, 1997
Erani Filiatra	5	1987, 1989, 2002, 2006, 2023
AEK Kalamata	4	1930, 1931, 1951, 1964
Prasina Poulia	4	1950, 1953, 1961, 1966
AO Kyparissia	3	1982, 2010, 2015
Telos Agras Gargalianoi	3	1996, 2007, 2026
Ethnikos Meligala	2	1972, 2012
Kalamata	2	1981, 2017
Omonoia Kalamata	2	1993, 1999
AO Sperchogeia	2	2000, 2011
Miltiadis Pyrgos Trifylia	2	2004, 2024
Panthouriakos	2	2022, 2025
Omilos Kalamata	1	1962
Pammessiniakos	1	1967
AO Messini	1	1990
Anagennisi Paralia	1	1991
Asteras Valyra	1	1995
Apollon Petalidi	1	2003
Asteras Arfara	1	2005
Olympiakos Kalamata	1	2009
Tsiklitiras Pylos	1	2016
AO Diavolitsi	1	2019

== Cup ==
=== Cup winners ===
Season	Winner
1972	Pamisos Messini
1973	Pamisos Messini
1974	Messiniakos
1975	Pamisos Messini
1976	Messiniakos
1977	Pamisos Messini
1978	Kalamata
1979	Pamisos Messini
1980	Kalamata
1981	Messiniakos
1982	Omonoia Kalamata
1983	Kalamata
1984	Messiniakos
1985	Pamisos Messini
1986	Messiniakos
1987	Messiniakos
1988	Pamisos Messini
1989	AO Messini
1990	Miltiadis Pyrgos Trifylia
1991	Anagennisi Paralia
1992	Apollon Kalamata
1993	AO Messini
1994	Pamisos Messini
1995	Erani Filiatra
1996	Pamisos Messini
1997	Telos Agras Gargalianoi
1998	Telos Agras Gargalianoi
1999	Apollon Kalamata
2000	Asteras Arfara
2001	Erani Filiatra
2002	Erani Filiatra
2003	Erani Filiatra
2004	Erani Filiatra
2005	Miltiadis Pyrgos Trifylia
2006	Asteras Arfara
2007	Miltiadis Pyrgos Trifylia
2008	Apollon Petalidi
2009	Erani Filiatra
2010	Erani Filiatra
2011	Pamisos Messini
2012	Erani Filiatra
2013	Messiniakos
2014	AO Kyparissia
2015	Tsiklitiras Pylos
2016	Tsiklitiras Pylos
2017	Kalamata
2018	Kalamata
2019	Kalamata
2020	AO Diavolitsi
2021	Cancelled
2022	Panthouriakos
2023	Pamisos Messini
2024	Erani Filiatra
2025	Panthouriakos
2026	Miltiadis Pyrgos Trifylia

=== Performance by club ===
Club	Titles	Season
Pamisos Messini	10	1972, 1973, 1975, 1977, 1979, 1985, 1988, 1994, 1996, 2011, 2023
Erani Filiatra	9	1995, 2001, 2002, 2003, 2004, 2009, 2010, 2012, 2024
Messiniakos	6	1974, 1976, 1981, 1984, 1986, 1987, 2013
Kalamata	6	1978, 1980, 1983, 2017, 2018, 2019
Miltiadis Pyrgos Trifylia	4	1990, 2005, 2007, 2026
Apollon Kalamata	2	1992, 1999
AO Messini	2	1989, 1993
Telos Agras Gargalianoi	2	1997, 1998
Asteras Arfara	2	2000, 2006
Tsiklitiras Pylos	2	2015, 2016
Panthouriakos	2	2022, 2025
Omonoia Kalamata	1	1982
Anagennisi Paralia	1	1991
Apollon Petalidi	1	2008
AO Kyparissia	1	2014
AO Diavolitsi	1	2020

== Clubs in the highest divisions ==
In the power of the MFCA it had 4 teams which in the 2026–27 season features those in the highest categories:

- Super League Greece:
  - Kalamata
- None in the Second division
- Third division:
  - Miltiadis Pyrgos Trifylias
  - Panthouriakos
  - Telos Agras Gargaliani

== Women's clubs ==
In the women's clubs features two teams:

- Messiniakos
- Niki 1991 Kalamata

== The veteran clubs ==
From the 2004-05 season, the Messinia Football Clubs Association runs a veterans championships. In the 2008-09 season, in the 5th veterans, it has 11 clubs: Apollon Kalamata, Kalamata, Messiniakos, Prasina Poulia Kalamata, Omonoia Kalamata, Thyella Paralia, Pamisos Messini, Atromitos Platy, Ethnikos Meligala, Kostis Tsiklitirias Pulos and Apollon Petalidi.

== Sources ==
- Eleftheria Kalamata (16-6-2008), page 6
