= Davidson Morais =

Brazilian footballer (born 1981)

Personal information
- Full name: Davidson de Oliveira Morais
- Date of birth: July 18, 1981 (age 45)
- Place of birth: Belo Horizonte, Brazil
- Height: 1.76 m (5 ft 9 in)
- Position: Right back

Senior career*
Years	Team	Apps	(Gls)
2001–2002	Taubaté	20	(0)
2002–2003	Messiniakos FC	26	(0)
2003–2004	Apollon Kalamarias	25	(1)
2005–2006	OFI	43	(1)
2006–2008	FC Dnipro Dnipropetrovsk	30	(0)
2007–2008	Figueirense	1	(0)
2009–2011	AC Omonia	54	(1)
- * Club domestic league appearances and goals as of May 2, 2010

Davidson de Oliveira Morais is a professional Brazilian footballer. He previously played in Greek football for Messiniakos FC, Asteras Tripolis and OFI, and following an unsuccessful trial for German side Alemannia Aachen in July 2006, he signed a three-year contract with Dnipro. After one year in Figueirense, Morais agreed to a contract with the Cypriot outfit AC Omonia. On 7 December 2011 he released on a free by Omonoia.

== Honours ==
Omonia

- Cypriot Championship: 2010
- Cypriot Cup: 2011
- Cyprus FA Shield: 2010
