= Messiniakos =

Multisports club in Greece

Messiniakos G.S.
- Full name: Μεσσηνιακός Γυμναστικός Σύλλογος; Messiniakos Gymnastikos Syllogos; (Messinian Gymnastic Club)
- Founded: 1888; 138 years ago
- Ground: Messiniakos Stadium, Kalamata
- Capacity: 5,150
- Chairman: Panagiotis Stasinopoulos
- Manager: Fragiskos Keranis
- League: Messinia FCA First Division
- 2025–26: Messinia FCA First Division, 14th
- Website: messiniakosgc1888.blogspot.com
Home colours	Away colours

Messiniakos Gymnastikos Syllogos (Greek: Μεσσηνιακός Γυμναστικός Σύλλογος, lit. 'Messinian Gymnastic Club') is the oldest football club in Greece with Panagiotis Benakis as its first president. The club was founded in 1888. Messiniakos' traditional colours are green and white and in 1924, the club adopted a platanus foil as its symbol.

Messiniakos has made a name of itself in many sports (football, volleyball, athletics, weight-lifting etc.) and has produced athletes, such as OFI's Brazilian footballer Davidson Morais and Louis Tsatoumas in track and field, who is one of the biggest hopes for Greek athletics. The club used to be home to the Papaflessia international athletics meeting. The volleyball team had appearances in the First Division, but is not participating at the current time.

== Football team ==
The football team participated in the Second National Division in the 2006–07 season. Its president is international businessman Stavros Papadopoulos. Papadopoulos is the former owner of Kalamata and Apollon Kalamaria. He bought both those teams when they were in the Third National Division and Second National Division, respectively, and invested substantial money into those teams and eventually took both those teams up to the First National Division.

Papadopoulos has shown he has the same plan for Messiniakos. He bought the team a few years back when it was just a local team, not even in Fourth National Division. He has invested money into the team and brought in talented young players. During this time the team has achieved promotion from a non-league team all the way up to the Second National Division, but has been relegated to the Third National Division for the upcoming season after finishing in second last place in 2007. The next years the football team weakened and now it plays in Messinia F.C.A. Second Division.

== Volleyball team ==
The volleyball women's team of Messiniakos plays in B National Division. The women's team has played one time in A1 National Division, in 1984–1985 season. The men's volleyball has also played in A1 National Division during 1985–1988 period.
