= Tsiklitiras Pylos F.C. =

Tsiklitiras Pylos
- Full name: Athlitikos Omilos Pylos "Olympionikis Kostis Tsiklitiras"
- Founded: 1968
- Ground: Municipal Pylos Stadium; Pylos, Messenia, Greece
- Capacity: 600
- Chairman: Anastasios Karalis
- Manager: Nikolaos Kakaletris
- League: Messinia FCA Second Division
- 2025–26: Messinia FCA Second Division, 13th
- Website: http://www.tsiklitirasfc.gr/

Tsiklitiras Pylos F.C. is a Greek football club, based in Pylos, Messenia. The club took its name from Konstantinos Tsiklitiras, a Greek athlete and Olympic Champion of the former century.

== Honors ==
=== Domestic Titles and honors ===
  - Messinia FCA Champions: 1
    - 2015–16
  - Messinia FCA Cup Winners: 2
    - 2014–15, 2015–16
