= Prasina Poulia =

Prassina Poulia Πράσινα Πουλιά Καλαμάτας
- Full name: Prassina Poulia Football Athletic Club; Ποδοσφαιρικός Αθλητικός Όμιλος "Πράσινα Πουλιά"
- Founded: 1938
- Ground: Kalamata, Greece
- League: Messenia First Division

Prassina Poulia Football Athletic Club (Greek: Ποδοσφαιρικός Αθλητικός Όμιλος "Πράσινα Πουλιά") is one of the oldest football clubs in Kalamata, Greece, being founded in 1938. Its colors are green and white and its name literally means "green birds".

== History ==
The team was founded during the interwar period as well as Apollon and had its famous football (soccer) clubs of the city. Prassina Poulia had followed mainly between the support of the Venizelian line up and the support of many refugees. From Prassina Poulis began the career in which afterwards the famous player of AEK and the national team Kleanthis Maropoulos. He played for two years in 1931 and 1933 and settled with the family in Athens.

From Prassina Poulia played its Messenian football (soccer) until the 1960s. In 1960-61 season Prassina Poulia participated in the B' National Greek Division. The dictatorship in 1967 dissolved the teams along with Apollon and Olympiakos and founded Kalamata.

Other than the soccer club, in 1948 it founded the swimming club along with Apollo, AEK Kalamata and Kalamata NC and on July 17, 1948 in Kalamtata had the swimming games of the First Akropoleia sponsored by the newspaper Akropolis.

== Refounding ==
After the fall of the regime in 1974, the club was refounded and played from then in the prefectural championship mainly in the first division. In the 2007-08 season it participated in the first club of the second division. In the summer of 2008, it played in the finals of the first pre-junior team of the MFCA in which lost 0-1 to Panionios.

== Achievements ==
- Messinia F.C.A. Regional Championship
  - Winners (3): 1950, 1953, 1961,

== Notable players ==
- Kleanthis Maropoulos
- Thanasis Bebis
- Antonis Mavreas
- Ioannis Dimitrakopoulos
- Georgios Zgantzos
- Nikolaos Koutsoudakis
