= Ethnikos Sidirokastro F.C. =

Ethnikos Sidirokastro
- Full name: Gymnastikos Syllogos Ethnikos Sidirokastro
- Founded: 1928; 98 years ago
- Ground: Municipal Stadium of Sidirokastro
- Capacity: 2,500
- Chairman: Savvas Konstantinidis
- Manager: Ioannis Tsemperidis
- League: Serres FCA First Division
- 2025–26: Serres FCA First Division, 8th
- Website: https://ethnikosfc1928.gr/
Home colours	Away colours

Ethnikos Sidirokastro Football Club is a Greek football club, based in Sidirokastro, Serres.

The club was founded in 1928. They spent two seasons at the Greek Second Division in 1975 and 1977. In 2012, they promoted to Football League 2, returning to the professional championships after 45 years.

== Honours ==
=== Domestic Titles and honours ===
- Total Titles: 18
  - Third Division: 2
    - 1974, 1976
  - Fourth Division: 1
    - 2012
  - Serres FCA First Division Champions: 6
    - 1973, 1974, 1998, 2011, 2018, 2020
  - Serres FCA Cup: 9
    - 1972, 1973, 1988, 1992, 1996, 1999, 2000, 2011, 2012
