= Andreas Mouratis =

Greek footballer (1926–2000)

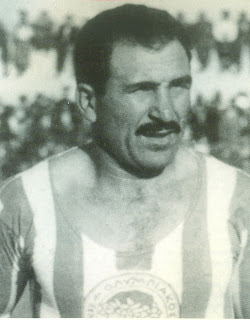

Personal information
- Date of birth: 29 November 1926
- Place of birth: Piraeus, Greece
- Date of death: 10 December 2000 (aged 74)
- Place of death: Piraeus, Greece
- Position: Defender

Youth career
- 1936–1943: A.E. Chromatourgion

Senior career*
Years	Team	Apps	(Gls)
1943–1945	Proodeftiki		
1945–1955	Olympiacos		
1955–1961	Argonaftis Piraeus		

International career
1948–1953	Greece	16	(1)
1952	Greece Olympic	0	(0)
1962	Greece Military		
- * Club domestic league appearances and goals

Andreas Mouratis (Greek: Ανδρέας Μουράτης; 29 November 1926 – 10 December 2000), nicknamed Missouri, was a Greek footballer, who played for Olympiacos. Besides his football career, he participated in the Greek Resistance during World War II, as a member of the National Liberation Front.

== Biography ==
He was born in 1926, in Piraeus, to a poor family of refugees from Asia Minor (Vourla).He was not a good student in his childhood and did several different jobs during his youth. During the axis occupation of Greece, he was active in the Resistance, stealing food from the occupation forces, and sharing it with other locals. He was also a part of United Panhellenic Organization of Youth (EPON), the youth branch of the National Liberation Front (EAM). In 1943, he joined Proodeftiki and in 1945, he was transferred to Olympiacos, asking in return, instead of money, that the state security delete his personal information from their archives. In the following years, he also played for the Greek national football team, but he was removed from the team in 1953, after demanding, along with his team mates, that they be paid by the HFF the money they had been promised for participating in the preliminaries of the 1954 FIFA World Cup.

Mouratis died at the age of 74.

== Career ==
He was a prominent figure for Olympiacos during the post-war era contributing to the club's success in numerous league and cup competitions. He became a popular player among Olympiacos supporters, with his energetic, aggressive and passionate style of play reflecting the qualities valued by the club's fanbase.

He made 16 appearances and scored one goal for the Greece national football team. He was also member of the national side for the 1952 Olympic Games, but he did not play in any matches.

Mouratis was nicknamed "Mourat Aslan" (Mouratis the Lion) by the Turkish press, after a friendly match of the national teams of Greece and Turkey. The nickname referred to his aggressive style of play during the match.

Mouratis was nicknamed "Mourat Aslan" ("Mouratis the Lion") by the Turkish press following a friendly match between the national teams of Greece and Turkey. The nickname referred to his aggressive style of play during the match.

== Honours ==
Olympiacos

- Panhellenic Championship: 1946–47, 1947–48, 1951–52, 1953–54, 1954–55
- Greek Cup: 1946–47, 1950–51, 1951–52, 1952–53, 1953–54
- Piraeus FCA Championship: 1946, 1947, 1948, 1949, 1950, 1951, 1952, 1953, 1954, 1955

Greek Military Team

- World Military Cup: 1962
