= Babis Drosos =

Greek footballer

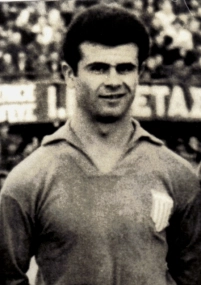
- Babis Drosos with Greece

Personal information
- Full name: Charalampos Drosos
- Date of birth: 19 March 1927
- Place of birth: Thiseio, Greece
- Date of death: 25 February 2015 (aged 87)
- Place of death: Athens, Greece
- Position: Forward

Youth career
- Thyella Peristeri
- –1944: Taxiarches Peristeri

Senior career*
Years	Team	Apps	(Gls)
1944–1948	Atromitos		
1948–1956	Olympiacos		

International career
1951–1953	Greece	8	(0)
1952	Greece Olympic	1	(0)
- * Club domestic league appearances and goals

Charalampos "Babis" Drosos (Greek: Χαράλαμπος "Μπάμπης" Δρόσος; 19 March 1927 – 25 February 2015) was a Greek footballer who played as a forward. He competed in the men's tournament at the 1952 Summer Olympics.

== Honours ==
Olympiacos

- Panhellenic Championship: 1950–51, 1953–54, 1954–55, 1955–56
- Greek Cup: 1950–51, 1951–52, 1952–53, 1953–54
- Piraeus FCA Championship: 1950, 1951, 1952, 1953, 1954, 1955, 1956
