= Pamisos Messini =

Pamissos Messini
- Full name: Pamissos Messini Gymnastic Football Club; Γυμναστικός Ποδοσφαιρικός Σύλλογος Πάμισος Μεσσήνης
- Founded: 1929; 97 years ago
- Ground: Messini Municipal Ground
- Capacity: 2,000
- Chairman: Ioannis Gozadinos
- Manager: Konstantinos Kladis
- League: Messinia FCA First Division
- 2025–26: Messinia FCA First Division, 6th
Home colours	Away colours

The Pamissos Messini Gymnastic Football Club (Greek: Gymnastikos Podosfairikos Syllogos Pamisos Messini) is a football club in Messini, Greece.

== History ==
The club was founded in 1929 in Messini in Messinia and took the name from the Pamisos River which flows in the city. Its colors are green and white and originally its emblem was a discus thrower.

In the entire direction, Pamissos played a championship role in the Messinia FCA games and took part several times in the local championships and the Messinia Cup three times.

The team played for two seasons in the Third Division 1997-98 and 2004–05 and most times in the Fourth Division.

In 1969, the team made it into the Second Division and in the match tied with Panileiakos 1-2.

In 1982, a fire in the club's offices destroyed the archive and early records of the club. In 2019, the club celebrated its 90th anniversary.

== Honours ==
- Delta Ethniki (1): 1996–97
- Messinia FCA First Division (15): 1967–68, 1968–69, 1969–70, 1970–71, 1972–73, 1975–76, 1977–78, 1983–84, 1985–86, 1987–88, 1993–94, 2007–08, 2013–14, 2017–18, 2019–20
- Messinia FCA Cup (11):

1971–72, 1972–73, 1974–75, 1976–77, 1978–79, 1984–85, 1987–88, 1993–94, 1995–96, 2010–11, 2022–23
