= Apollon Kalamata =

Greek soccer club

- Full name: Apollon Kalamata Football Club
- Founded: 1927
- Ground: Asprochoma Ground, Asprochoma, Messenia, Greece
- Capacity: 300
- League: Messenia FCA Third Division
- 2022–23: Messenia FCA First Division, 18th (relegated)

Apollon Kalamata (Greek: Απόλλων Καλαμάτας) is a football (soccer) club in Kalamata, Greece. It currently plays in the Messenia(n) First Division.

== History ==
Founded in 1927, the club sports black and white colors and features a three-leafed clover as its emblem. In the prewar era, its players predominantly came from the royalist segment of the population. Alongside Prassina Poulia, it became one of Kalamata's prominent football (soccer) teams. Notably, Apollon had a significantly large roster of players.

After the war, it took part many times in the prefectural championships and took part in their first championship in the Second Division in 1959 and 1960. In 1967, the dictatorship dissolved temporarily the team and united with two other clubs of the city: Prasina Poulia and Olympiakos to create Kalamata.

Apollon was refounded in 1974 and returned to its original position. It began from the last part of the prefectural soccer. It quickly elevated to the categories and in the 1975-76 season, it returned to the national category. It did not enter the Second Division.

From then, it took part in many local titles and had won many times in the National Artistic Championships of the fourth division. It plays in the prefectural first division.

From Apollon, Panagiotis Bahramis started is career and participated in the national youth team and later in first division teams.

Other than the soccer club, in 1948, it mention the founding of the swimming club along with Prassina Poulia, AEK Kalamata and Kalamata NC founded on July 17, 1948, in Kalamata and its swimming teams "First Akropoleia" with the sponsor of the newspaper "Akropolis".

In June 2025, the team named a new president and board of directors. Lymberis Panagiotis V. was appointed president of the club.

== Achievements ==
- National Artistic Championships (1) (1975)
- Messinia FCA Championship (7):

1959, 1960, 1965, 1979, 1983, 1992, 1997

- Messinia FCA Cup (2):

1992, 1999
