= Georgios Darivas =

Greek footballer (1926–2024)

Personal information
- Date of birth: 12 March 1926
- Place of birth: Athens, Greece
- Date of death: 15 January 2024 (aged 97)
- Place of death: Athens, Greece
- Position: Forward

Senior career*
| Years | Team | Apps | (Gls) |
| 1943–1946 | Niki Plaka | | |
| 1946–1958 | Olympiacos | 270 | (160) |
| 1958–1959 | Doxa Piraeus | | |

International career
| 1951–1955 | Greece | 16 | (4) |
| 1952 | Greece Olympic | 1 | (0) |

Managerial career
- 1962–1965: Kadmos Thiva
- 1970: Koropi
- 1971: Olympiacos
- 1972–1973: Fostiras
- 1973–1974: Vyzas Megara
- 1974: AO Chalkida
- 1974–1975: Ilisiakos
- 1975: Olympiacos
- 1976: Olympiacos
- 1977: Atromitos
- 1977: Apollon Kalamarias
- 1980–1981: Panegialios
- 1987: Trikala
- * Club domestic league appearances and goals

Georgios Darivas (Greek: Γεώργιος Δαρίβας; 12 March 1926 – 15 January 2024) was a Greek coach and footballer who played as a forward for Olympiacos. He competed in the men's tournament at the 1952 Summer Olympics.

As player with Olympiacos won the greek championship seven times (1948, 1951, 1954, 1955, 1956, 1957 και 1958) and the Greek Cup six times (1951, 1952, 1953, 1954, 1957 και 1958). After his retirement, he worked as manager in the youth departments of Olympiacos and then as interim manager of Olympiacos (1971 and 1975).

Darivas died on 15 January 2024, at the age of 97.
