= 1962–63 AEK Athens F.C. season =

AEK Athens
1962–63 season
- Chairman: Nikos Goumas
- Manager: Jenő Csaknády
- Stadium: AEK Stadium
- Alpha Ethniki: 1st
- Greek Cup: Quarter-finals
- Top goalscorer: League: Kostas Nestoridis (24); All: Kostas Nestoridis (28)
- Highest home attendance: 35,000 vs Panathinaikos (23 June 1963)
- Lowest home attendance: 4,623 vs Iraklis (2 June 1963)
- Average home league attendance: 18,508
- Biggest win: AEK Athens 7–1 Olympiacos Kalamata
- Biggest defeat: AEK Athens 0–2 Panathinaikos
Home colours	Away colours

The 1962–63 season was the 39th season in the existence of AEK Athens F.C. and the fourth consecutive season in the top flight of Greek football. They competed in the Alpha Ethniki and the Greek Cup. The season began on 27 September 1962 and finished on 7 July 1963.

== Kits ==
Home	Away

== Overview ==
Since the beginning of the previous season, Nikos Goumas aimed for AEK Athens to win the league. With a series of actions and by sparing no expense, he sought to strengthen the club at multiple levels. The Nea Filadelfeia Stadium had already been modernized by acquiring turf and reconstructed spectator stands and since its official inauguration in January 1962, was among the most modern stadiums in Greece at the time. The former player, Kleanthis Maropoulos, serving in an administrative role, was tasked with protecting the club from off-field interference. The transfer reinforcement laid the foundations for the club’s upcoming season, with the signing of the international Syrian striker, Ibrahim Mughrabi, Manolis Kanellopoulos and Sofos Koulidis from Egaleo, Manolis Klikopoulos from Ethnikos Piraeus, Vangelis Petrakis from Aris and most importantly Mimis Papaioannou from Veria. All of the above was preceded by the arrival of the Hungarian-German Jenő Csaknády as their new manager. Csaknády was already a successful manager at the Bundesliga and a prominent figure by the Greek standards of the time. The new manager showed from the beginning that he intended to align AEK with the professional standards of major European clubs, emphasizing discipline and the uniform treatment of players and the adoption of contemporary training methods and tactical systems. Csaknády quickly recognized the potential of Papaioannou and urged the management to pay the fee of 175,000 drachmas for his acquisition rather than signing him on a free transfer and wait for the expiration of the player's typical one-year suspension. The emphasis on discipline was reflected in the team's routine, which included managerial decisions such as the exclusion of Kostas Nestoridis and Mimis Anastasiadis from a friendly match against Barcelona at the Camp Nou, due to a prior breach of team rules. The approach of Csaknády endowed the team with cohesion, passion and commitment, while the imposition of the start of preparation from August 1, earlier than was typical for Greek clubs at the time, contributed to the improved physical conditioning of the players throughout the season.

The start of the league showed that the scenario of the previous seasons would be repeated with AEK and Panathinaikos fighting for the title, while Olympiacos would be waiting to take advantage of any possible missteps. The certainty of the "greens" for the conquest of the Championship was to such an extent that they did not proceed with any additions to their roster, as considering it complete. The three contenders engaged in a title-race that was close, until AEK prevailed over Olympiacos at Karaiskakis Stadium by 1–3 on the 13th matchday and moved to the top of the table with 33 points. However, in February, the defeat at the same stadium by Ethnikos Piraeus, removed the yellow-blacks from the top of the table. AEK responded with a streak of eight consecutive victories from the 19th matchday to the 26th matchday and combined with the draw by Panathinaikos in the same matchday, they again reached the top of the table. The following matchday against Panathinaikos at home in an inconclusive match despite an underwhelming performance by AEK, they lost by 0–2 and the "greens" emerged as the favorite for their fourth consecutive title. After the end of the three final matches of the league AEK and Panathinaikos finished tied at the top with 77 points each. The regulation of the championship stipulated a play-off match between the two clubs and in the event of a tie declared the team with the best goal ratio in the regular season as the champion.

On June 23, AEK and Panathinaikos met at the Stadium of Nea Filadelfeia, which was selected as the venue for the match. Panathinaikos took the lead at the 8th minute with a goal by Toumpelis, but AEK responded immediately by turning the match with a brace by Papaioannou at the 23rd and 27th minute, respectively. Furthermore, at the 39th minute Nestoridis made it 3–1 from a direct corner kick, bringing AEK close to the title. The "greens" took advantage of a period of inactivity of AEK and with goals from Linoxilakis at the 64th minute and Panagiotidis at the 65th minute, equalized the match at 3–3, which remained as the final score. Thus, despite Panathinaikos having a superior goal difference with +47 compared to AEK which had +45, the goal ratio defined by the regulation gave AEK the title with 3.14 against the 2.68 of the "greens". As AEK won their first post-war league and the first since the establishment of national divisions, Kostas Nestoridis emerged as the top scorer in the championship with 23 goals for the 5th time in a row and for the last in his career.

As all the first division clubs of the season, AEK entered the Cup at the round of 32. There, they defeated Olympiacos Kalamata with 7–1 at home and were qualified to the round of 16. Afterwards, they got the ticket for the quarter-finals by eliminating Atromitos with a 0–3 victory at Peristeri Stadium. In the quarter-finals, AEK faced Aris at Thessaloniki and were eliminated with a 1–0 defeat which came by a header from Panitsidis at the 9th minute.

== Management team ==
Position	Staff
Manager	(Hungary) Jenő Csaknády
Technical director	(Greece) Kleanthis Maropoulos
Academy director	(Greece) Georgios Daispangos
Academy manager	(Greece) Georgios Daispangos
Academy manager	(Greece) Kostas Poulis

== Players ==
=== Squad information ===
NOTE: The players are the ones that have been announced by the AEK Athens' press release. No edits should be made unless a player arrival or exit is announced. Updated 7 July 1963, 23:59 UTC+2.

Player	Nat.	Position(s)	Date of birth (Age)	Signed	Previous club	Transfer fee
Goalkeepers
Stelios Serafidis	(Greece)	GK	6 August 1935 (aged 27)	1953	(Greece) AEK Athens U20	—
Vangelis Petrakis	(Greece)	GK	7 September 1938 (aged 24)	1962	(Greece) Aris	₯500,000
Defenders
Manolis Klikopoulos	(Greece)	CB	1932 (aged 30–31)	1962	(Greece) Ethnikos Piraeus	Free
Giannis Marditsis	(Greece)	CB / ST	19 February 1933 (aged 30)	1959	(Greece) Egaleo	₯103,000
Petros Stamatelopoulos	(Greece)	LB	19 March 1934 (aged 29)	1959	(Greece) Panerythraikos	₯100,000
Alekos Sofianidis	(Greece) (Turkey)	LB / LM / LW	3 August 1935 (aged 27)	1959	(Turkey) Beşiktaş	Free
Mimis Anastasiadis	(Greece)	RB / CB / ST	26 October 1936 (aged 26)	1956	(Greece) A.O. Nea Ionia	Free
Giannis Doukas	(Greece)	CB / DM	6 June 1937 (aged 26)	1962	Free agent	Free
Manolis Kanellopoulos	(Greece)	RB / CB	12 January 1938 (aged 25)	1962	(Greece) Egaleo	Free
Theofilos Vernezis	(Greece)	RB / CB / GK	1938 (aged 24–25)	1956	(Greece) AEK Athens U20	—
Stamatis Skafidas	(Greece)	RB / CB	1944 (aged 18–19)	1962	(Greece) AEK Athens U20	—
Midfielders
Miltos Papapostolou	(Greece)	DM / CB	9 September 1935 (aged 27)	1956	(Greece) Egaleo	Free
Giorgos Petridis	(Greece)	AM / SS / ST / LW	10 February 1938 (aged 25)	1957	(Greece) Pera Club	Free
Panikos Krystallis	(Cyprus)	AM / SS / CM / RM / LM	1 July 1938 (aged 24)	1961	(Cyprus) Apollon Limassol	₯1,900,000
Stelios Skevofilakas	(Greece)	LM / RM / AM / CM	6 January 1939 (aged 24)	1961	(Greece) Eleftheroupoli	Free
Thanasis Gouvas	(Greece)	AM / RW / SS / ST	April 1939 (aged 24)	1960	(Greece) A.E. Messolonghi	Free
Sofos Koulidis	(Greece)	CM / AM	1939 (aged 23–24)	1962	(Greece) Egaleo	Free
Forwards
Kostas Nestoridis	(Greece)	ST / SS / LW / RW	15 March 1930 (aged 33)	1955	(Greece) Panionios	Free
Andreas Stamatiadis (Captain)	(Greece)	RW / LW / SS / AM	16 August 1935 (aged 27)	1952	(Greece) AEK Athens U20	—
Dimitris Zagylos	(Cyprus)	RW	15 March 1938 (aged 25)	1961	(Cyprus) Anorthosis Famagusta	₯320,000
Ibrahim Mughrabi	(Palestine) (Syria)	ST	1939 (aged 23–24)	1962	(Syria) Halab Al-Ahli	Free
Nikos Zagotsis	(Greece)	ST / SS	16 March 1940 (aged 23)	1960	(Greece) AEK Athens U20	—
Aris Tsachouridis	(Greece)	LW / LM / RM / RW	10 December 1940 (aged 22)	1960	(Greece) Makedonikos	Free
Mimis Papaioannou	(Greece)	SS / ST / AM / RW	17 November 1942 (aged 20)	1962	(Greece) Veria	₯175,000
Spyros Pomonis	(Greece)	LW / LM	12 February 1944 (aged 19)	1960	(Greece) AEK Athens U20	—
Nikos Spyropoulos	(Greece)	CF	1945 (aged 17–18)	1962	Free agent	Free

== Transfers ==
=== In ===
Pos.	Player	From	Fee	Date	Source
GK	(Greece) Vangelis Petrakis	(Greece) Aris	₯500,000	17 July 1962	
DF	(Greece) Manolis Klikopoulos	(Greece) Ethnikos Piraeus	Free transfer	30 July 1962	
DF	(Greece) Giannis Doukas	Free agent	Free transfer	1 July 1962	
DF	(Greece) Manolis Kanellopoulos	(Greece) Egaleo	Free transfer^{[a]}	31 July 1962	
DF	(Greece) Stamatis Skafidas	(Greece) AEK Athens U20	Promotion	1 July 1962	
MF	(Greece) Sofos Koulidis	(Greece) Egaleo	Free transfer^{[a]}	31 July 1962	
FW	(Greece) Mimis Papaioannou	(Greece) Veria	₯175,000	10 July 1962	
FW	(Palestine) Ibrahim Mughrabi	(Syria) Halab Al-Ahli	Free transfer	1 July 1962	
FW	(Greece) Nikos Spyropoulos	Free agent	Free transfer	1 July 1962	

a. Plus Sotiris Fakis as an exchange from the transfers of Kanellopoulos and Koulidis.

=== Out ===
Pos.	Player	To	Fee	Date	Source
GK	(Greece) Sotiris Fakis	(Greece) Egaleo	Free transfer	31 July 1962	
DF	(Greece) Dimitris Tzaneras	(Greece) AEK Athens U20	Demotion	1 July 1962	
MF	(Greece) Alekos Daispangos	(Greece) Panegialios	Free transfer	1 July 1962	
FW	(Greece) Christos Ampos	(Australia) Pan Hellenic	Free transfer	1 July 1962	
FW	(Greece) Argyris Argyropoulos	(Greece) Panegialios	Contract termination	30 July 1962	
FW	(Greece) Simos Vavaleros	(Greece) AEK Athens U20	Demotion	1 July 1962	

=== Overall transfer activity ===
Expenditure: ▼ ₯675,000

Income: ▲ ₯0

Net Total: ▼ ₯675,000

== Pre-season and friendlies ==
18 August 1962 Friendly	AEK Athens	5–3	Panegialios	Nea Filadelfeia
	Zagotsis		Goal	Stadium: AEK Stadium

19 August 1962 Friendly	AEK Athens	7–3	Apollon Limassol	Nea Filadelfeia
17:15 EET (UTC+2)	Stamatiadis 4'; Ibrahim 33', 62', 78'; Papaioannou 55', 81'; Gouvas 68'		Ioannidis 40'; Vasiliadis 50'; Georgiou 85'	Stadium: AEK Stadium; Attendance: 12,000; Referee: Epaminondas Chatzinikolaou (Athens)
Note: Friendly match as part of the transfer of Panikos Krystallis from the previous season.

25 August 1962 Friendly	Barcelona	6–1	AEK Athens	Barcelona
	Villaverde 24', 29'; Camps 42'; Kocsis 59'; Vergés 72'; Ré 82'	Report	Zagotsis	Stadium: Camp Nou

2 September 1962 Friendly	AEK Athens	0–1	Ethnikos Piraeus	Nea Filadelfeia
			Goal	Stadium: AEK Stadium

26 December 1962 Friendly	AEK Athens	2–1	Partizan	Nea Filadelfeia
	Goal		Goal	Stadium: AEK Stadium

6 January 1963 Friendly	AEK Athens	0–4	Příbram	Nea Filadelfeia
			Goal	Stadium: AEK Stadium

19 February 1963 Friendly	AEK Athens	1–1	Petrolul Ploiești	Nea Filadelfeia
	Goal		Goal	Stadium: AEK Stadium

15 April 1963 Friendly	Olympiacos	7–1	AEK Athens	Piraeus
	Besis 10'; Polychroniou 21'; Psychos 22', 60'; Gavezos 56'; Grigoriadis 66', 89'	Report	Loukanidis 43' (o.g.)	Stadium: Karaiskakis Stadium; Attendance: 15,000; Referee: Vangelis Vernardakis (Piraeus)
Note: Both clubs used players from their reserve and youth teams.

21 April 1963 Friendly	AEK Athens	2–2	Portuguesa	Nea Filadelfeia
	Goal		Goal	Stadium: AEK Stadium

== Competitions ==
=== Overall record ===
Competition	First match	Last match	Starting round	Final position	Record							
Competition	First match	Last match	Starting round	Final position	Pld	W	D	L	GF	GA	GD	Win %
Alpha Ethniki	27 September 1962	8 June 1963	Matchday 1	Winners	30	20	7	3	66	21	+45	66.67
Championship play-off	23 June 1963		Final	Winners	1	0	1	0	3	3	+0	0.00
Greek Cup	19 May 1963	7 July 1963	Round of 32	Quarter-finals	3	2	0	1	10	2	+8	66.67
Total					34	22	8	4	79	26	+53	64.71

Last updated: 7 July 1963
Source: Competitions

=== Alpha Ethniki ===
==== League table ====
Pos	Team	Pld	W	D	L	GF	GA	GR	Pts	Qualification or relegation
1	AEK Athens (C)	30	20	7	3	66	21	3.143	77 (Note: Championship play-off: AEK Athens–Panathinaikos 3–3, AEK Athens become the champions due to the better total goal ratio. (see below).)	Qualification for European Cup preliminary round
2	Panathinaikos	30	19	9	2	75	28	2.679	77	
3	Olympiacos	30	19	7	4	62	39	1.590	75	Qualification for Cup Winners' Cup first round
4	PAOK	30	13	8	9	44	34	1.294	64	
5	Ethnikos Piraeus	30	12	9	9	47	41	1.146	63	

Source: RSSSF
Rules for classification: 1st points; 2nd decision match; 3rd head-to-head goal ratio.
(C) Champions

==== Results summary ====
Overall								Home						Away					
Pld	W	D	L	GF	GA	GD	Pts	W	D	L	GF	GA	GD	W	D	L	GF	GA	GD
30	20	7	3	66	21	+45	77	12	2	1	44	14	+30	8	5	2	22	7	+15

Source: Competitive matches

==== Results by Matchday ====
Round	1	2	3	4	5	6	7	8	9	10	11	12	13	14	15	16	17	18	19	20	21	22	23	24	25	26	27	28	29	30
Ground	H	A	H	H	A	A	H	A	A	A	A	A	H	A	H	A	H	A	H	A	A	H	A	H	Η	H	H	H	H	A
Result	W	W	W	D	W	W	D	D	W	L	W	D	W	D	D	W	W	L	W	W	W	W	W	W	W	W	L	D	W	W
Position	1	1	1	2	2	2	2	3	2	3	3	3	1	3	3	2	2	3	3	2	2	2	2	2	1	1	2	2	2	1

Source: Competitive matches
A = Away; H = Home; W = Win; D = Draw; L = Loss; P = Postponed

==== Matches ====
27 September 1962 1	AEK Athens	7–2	Egaleo	Nea Filadelfeia
16:00 EET (UTC+2)	Ibrahim 22', 54', 87'; Nestoridis 25', 41'; Papaioannou 30'; Petridis 72'		Maramenidis 51', 83'	Stadium: AEK Stadium; Attendance: 20,000; Referee: Stefanidis
Note: The match was scheduled for 23 September, but was postponed due to obligations of Greece.

30 September 1962 2	Panegialios	0–2	AEK Athens	Aigio
15:45 EET (UTC+2)			Zagylos 43', 64'	Stadium: Aigio National Stadium; Attendance: 9,300; Referee: Kostas Xanthos (Dodecanese)
Note: From the 68th minute AEK played with 10 players due the injury of Doukas.

7 October 1962 3	AEK Athens	4–0	Ethnikos Piraeus	Nea Filadelfeia
15:30 EET (UTC+2)	Ibrahim 44'; Nestoridis 63', 89'; Petridis 78'			Stadium: AEK Stadium; Attendance: 24,514; Referee: Antonis Choumerianos (Heraklion)

14 October 1962 4	Niki Volos	0–0	AEK Athens	Volos
15:30 EET (UTC+2)				Stadium: Niki Volos Stadium; Attendance: 6,181; Referee: Aristeidis Lekkas (Piraeus)

21 October 1962 5	AEK Athens	3–1	Aris	Nea Filadelfeia
15:30 EET (UTC+2)	Ibrahim 9'; Papaioannou 50'; Tsachouridis 86'		Kalliotzis 89' (pen.)	Stadium: AEK Stadium; Attendance: 22,400; Referee: Thomas Vergotis (Rhodes)

27 October 1962 6	AEK Athens	3–1	Fostiras	Nea Filadelfeia
15:15 EET (UTC+2)	Gouvas 9'; Papaioannou 16'; Nestoridis 59'		Liolios 74'	Stadium: AEK Stadium; Attendance: 15,608; Referee: Kostas Xanthos (Dodecanese)

11 November 1962 7	Pierikos	1–1	AEK Athens	Katerini
15:00 EET (UTC+2)	Kiziroglou 53'		Papaioannou 36'	Stadium: Katerini Stadium; Attendance: 6,039; Referee: Antonis Choumerianos (Heraklion)

18 November 1962 8	Apollon Athens	0–0	AEK Athens	Rizoupoli
15:00 EET (UTC+2)				Stadium: Rizoupoli Stadium; Attendance: 18,400; Referee: Spanos (Patras)

25 November 1962 9	AEK Athens	1–0	Apollon Kalamarias	Nea Filadelfeia
15:00 EET (UTC+2)	Nestoridis 53'			Stadium: AEK Stadium; Attendance: 11,669; Referee: Vangelis Vernardakis (Piraeus)

2 December 1962 10	Panionios	2–1	AEK Athens	Nea Smyrni
15:00 EET (UTC+2)	Dedes 40'; Giannakopoulos 59' (pen.)		Papaioannou 72'	Stadium: Nea Smyrni Stadium; Attendance: 11,484; Referee: Moshe Mizrahi (Israel)

9 December 1962 11	PAOK	0–3	AEK Athens	Thessaloniki
15:00 EET (UTC+2)			Papaioannou 20'; Stamatiadis 34'; Nestoridis 82'	Stadium: Toumba Stadium; Attendance: 14,442; Referee: Nicolae Mihăilescu (Romania)

16 December 1962 12	Panathinaikos	1–1	AEK Athens	Ampelokipoi
15:00 EET (UTC+2)	Linoxilakis 67'; Theofanis (penalty missed) 86'		Krystallis 66'	Stadium: Leoforos Alexandras Stadium; Attendance: 25,514; Referee: Stelian Mataiser (Romania)

23 December 1962 13	Olympiacos	1–3	AEK Athens	Piraeus
15:00 EET (UTC+2)	Polychroniou 89' (pen.)		Nestoridis (penalty missed) 18'; Simantiris 39' (o.g.); Polychroniou 45' (o.g.); Papaioannou 59'	Stadium: Karaiskakis Stadium; Attendance: 26,503; Referee: Vasile Dumitrescu (Romania)

13 January 1963 14	Iraklis	0–0	AEK Athens	Thessaloniki
15:15 EET (UTC+2)				Stadium: Aris Stadium; Attendance: 10,242; Referee: Antonis Choumerianos (Heraklion)
Note: The Romanian referee he did not show up, so Antonis Choumerianos took his place. At the 76th minute Iraklis scored a goal but the referee disallowed it as offside. Thus, after the end of the match Iraklis filed an objection, without any result.

20 January 1963 15	AEK Athens	0–0	Proodeftiki	Nea Filadelfeia
15:15 EET (UTC+2)				Stadium: AEK Stadium; Attendance: 12,837; Referee: Thomas Vergotis (Rhodes)

10 February 1963 16	Egaleo	0–3	AEK Athens	Aigaleo
15:30 EET (UTC+2)			Papaioannou 38', 62'; Stamatiadis 66'	Stadium: Egaleo Municipal Stadium; Attendance: 8,902; Referee: Aristeidis Lekkas (Piraeus)
Note: The matchday was scheduled to take place on 27 January, but was canceled due to bad weather in the whole country.

3 February 1963 17	AEK Athens	2–1	Panegialios	Nea Filadelfeia
15:30 EET (UTC+2)	Papaioannou 53'; Nestoridis 81'		Papapostolou 88' (o.g.)	Stadium: Nikos Goumas Stadium; Attendance: 9,730; Referee: Alexandros Monastiriotis (Piraeus)

17 February 1963 18	Ethnikos Piraeus	1–0	AEK Athens	Piraeus
15:30 EET (UTC+2)	Nikiforakis 53'		Papapostolou (red card) 87'	Stadium: Karaiskakis Stadium; Attendance: 19,902; Referee: Giuseppe Adami (Italy)

24 February 1963 19	AEK Athens	2–0	Niki Volos	Nea Filadelfeia
15:45 EET (UTC+2)	Tsachouridis 59'; Nestoridis 69'			Stadium: AEK Stadium; Attendance: 8,629; Referee: Sklavounos (Patras)
Note: The administration of AEK had granted permission for a few days to Jenő Csaknády, thus Georgios Daispangos was on the bench of the team.

3 March 1963 20	Aris	0–1	AEK Athens	Thessaloniki
15:45 EET (UTC+2)			Skevofilakas 88' (pen.)	Stadium: Aris Stadium; Attendance: 7,500; Referee: Ali Kandil (Egypt)
Note: At the 65th minute the goalkeeper of Aris, Kalderimtzis was injured in the head and left the pitch for 15 minutes. Alexiadis took his place under the goalposts.

10 March 1963 21	Fostiras	1–3	AEK Athens	Tavros
15:00 EET (UTC+2)	Arseniadis 69'		Nestoridis 31'; Stamatiadis 66'; Papaioannou 90+1'	Stadium: Tavros Stadium; Attendance: 16,487; Referee: Daniel María Zariquiegui Izco (Spain)

10 April 1963 22	AEK Athens	3–1	Pierikos	Nea Filadelfeia
16:30 EET (UTC+2)	Nestoridis 45+2'; Papaioannou 58'; Tsachouridis 76'		Kefalidis 51'	Stadium: AEK Stadium; Attendance: 16,881; Referee: Antonis Choumerianos (Piraeus)
Note: The match was scheduled to take place on 17 March, but was postponed because AEK went to Cyprus.

24 March 1963 23	AEK Athens	4–3	Apollon Athens	Nea Filadelfeia
16:00 EET (UTC+2)	Nestoridis 45+2', 51', 52'; Bethanis 88' (o.g.)		Kamaras 19', 27'; Frangou 23'	Stadium: AEK Stadium; Attendance: 24,075; Referee: Manuel Gómez Arribas (Spain)

31 March 1963 24	Apollon Kalamarias	0–3	AEK Athens	Thessaloniki
16:00 EET (UTC+2)			Nestoridis 5'; Papaioannou 79'; Petridis 85'	Stadium: Toumba Stadium; Attendance: 6,764; Referee: Werner Treichel (West Germany)

28 April 1963 25	AEK Athens	3–0	Panionios	Nea Filadelfeia
17:00 EET (UTC+2)	Nestoridis 67'; Ibrahim 76'; Papaioannou 79'			Stadium: AEK Stadium; Attendance: 28,592; Referee: Priamo Varazzani (Italy)

5 May 1963 26	AEK Athens	5–1	PAOK	Nea Filadelfeia
17:00 EET (UTC+2)	Tsachouridis 2'; Stamatiadis 28'; Nestoridis 36'; Papaioannou 54'; Ibrahim 77'		Giakoumis 84'	Stadium: AEK Stadium; Attendance: 18,470; Referee: Aristeidis Lekkas (Piraeus)

12 May 1963 27	AEK Athens	0–2	Panathinaikos	Nea Filadelfeia
17:00 EET (UTC+2)			Panakis 79', 88'	Stadium: AEK Stadium; Attendance: 34,900; Referee: Günther Baumgärtel (West Germany)

26 May 1963 28	AEK Athens	2–2	Olympiacos	Nea Filadelfeia
17:30 EET (UTC+2)	Stefanakos 19' (o.g.); Papaioannou 40'		Sideris 48'; Grigoriadis 63'	Stadium: AEK Stadium; Attendance: 29,344; Referee: Josef Kandlbinder (West Germany)

2 June 1963 29	AEK Athens	5–0	Iraklis	Nea Filadelfeia
17:30 EET (UTC+2)	Nestoridis 15', 25', 60' (pen.), 83', 85'			Stadium: AEK Stadium; Attendance: 4,623; Referee: Patsanian (Piraeus)
Note: Kostas Nestoridis became the first footballer of AEK to score five goals in an Alpha Ethniki match.

8 June 1963 30	Proodeftiki	0–1	AEK Athens	Piraeus
17:30 EET (UTC+2)			Nestoridis 49'	Stadium: Karaiskakis Stadium; Attendance: 13,026; Referee: Kostas Xanthos (Dodecanese)

==== Championship play-off ====
23 June 1963 Play-off match	AEK Athens	3–3	Panathinaikos	Nea Filadelfeia
17:30 EET (UTC+2)	Papaioannou 24', 27'; Nestoridis 39'	Report	Panagiotidis 9'; Linoxilakis 65'; Toumpelis 66'	Stadium: AEK Stadium; Attendance: 35,000; Referee: Andries Van Leeuwen (Netherlands)

=== Greek Cup ===
AEK entered the Greek Cup at the round of 32.

==== Matches ====
19 May 1963 Round of 32	AEK Athens	7–1	Olympiacos Kalamata	Nea Filadelfeia
17:00 EET (UTC+2)	Zagylos 3'; Nestoridis 14', 30', 74'; Ibrahim 56', 90'; Stamatiadis 77'		Korogonas 49' (pen.)	Stadium: Nikos Goumas Stadium; Referee: Vangelis Vernardakis (Piraeus)

5 June 1963 Round of 16	Atromitos	0–3	AEK Athens	Peristeri
17:00 EET (UTC+2)	Ramfos (penalty missed) 73'		Nestoridis 43'; Zagylos 54'; Papaioannou 88'	Stadium: Peristeri Stadium; Referee: Aristeidis Lekkas (Piraeus)

7 July 1963 Quarter-finals	Aris	1–0	AEK Athens	Thessaloniki
21:30 EET (UTC+2)	Panitsidis 9' (red card) 19'			Stadium: Kaftanzoglio Stadium; Attendance: 25,000; Referee: Alfred Haberfellner (Austria)
Note: The administration of AEK had decided to remove Jenő Csaknády, thus Georgios Daispangos was sitting on the bench of the team.

== Statistics ==
=== Squad statistics ===
As of 7 July 1963

No.	Pos	Player	Alpha Ethniki		Greek Cup		Total	
No.	Pos	Player	Apps	Goals	Apps	Goals	Apps	Goals
Goalkeepers
—	GK	(Kingdom of Greece) Stelios Serafidis	31	0	3	0	34	0
—	GK	(Kingdom of Greece) Vangelis Petrakis	0	0	0	0	0	0
Defenders
—	DF	(Kingdom of Greece) Manolis Klikopoulos	7	0	0	0	7	0
—	DF	(Kingdom of Greece) Giannis Marditsis	19	0	3	0	22	0
—	DF	(Kingdom of Greece) Petros Stamatelopoulos	0	0	0	0	0	0
—	DF	(Kingdom of Greece) Alekos Sofianidis	31	0	2	0	33	0
—	DF	(Kingdom of Greece) Mimis Anastasiadis	0	0	0	0	0	0
—	DF	(Kingdom of Greece) Giannis Doukas	8	0	0	0	8	0
—	DF	(Kingdom of Greece) Manolis Kanellopoulos	28	0	3	0	31	0
—	DF	(Kingdom of Greece) Theofilos Vernezis	0	0	0	0	0	0
—	DF	(Kingdom of Greece) Stamatis Skafidas	3	0	1	0	4	0
Midfielders
—	MF	(Kingdom of Greece) Miltos Papapostolou	19	0	3	0	22	0
—	MF	(Kingdom of Greece) Giorgos Petridis	22	3	1	0	23	3
—	MF	(Cyprus) Panikos Krystallis	8	1	0	0	8	1
—	MF	(Kingdom of Greece) Stelios Skevofilakas	30	1	2	0	32	1
—	MF	(Kingdom of Greece) Thanasis Gouvas	4	1	0	0	4	1
—	MF	(Kingdom of Greece) Sofos Koulidis	2	0	0	0	2	0
Forwards
—	FW	(Kingdom of Greece) Kostas Nestoridis	30	24	3	4	33	28
—	FW	(Kingdom of Greece) Andreas Stamatiadis	22	4	3	1	25	5
—	FW	(Cyprus) Dimitris Zagylos	4	2	3	2	7	4
—	FW	(Palestine) Ibrahim Mughrabi	22	7	1	2	23	9
—	FW	(Kingdom of Greece) Nikos Zagotsis	0	0	0	0	0	0
—	FW	(Kingdom of Greece) Aris Tsachouridis	18	4	3	0	21	4
—	FW	(Kingdom of Greece) Mimis Papaioannou	31	18	2	1	33	19
—	FW	(Kingdom of Greece) Spyros Pomonis	0	0	0	0	0	0
—	FW	(Kingdom of Greece) Nikos Spyropoulos	2	0	0	0	2	0

=== Goalscorers ===
As of 7 July 1963
The list is sorted by competition order when total goals are equal, then by position and then alphabetically by surname.

Rank	Pos.	Player	Alpha Ethniki	Greek Cup	Total
1	FW	(Greece) Kostas Nestoridis	24	4	28
2	FW	(Greece) Mimis Papaioannou	18	1	19
3	FW	(Palestine) Ibrahim Mughrabi	7	2	9
4	FW	(Greece) Andreas Stamatiadis	4	1	5
5	FW	(Greece) Aris Tsachouridis	4	0	4
5	FW	(Cyprus) Dimitris Zagylos	2	2	4
7	MF	(Greece) Giorgos Petridis	3	0	3
8	MF	(Greece) Stelios Skevofilakas	1	0	1
8	MF	(Greece) Thanasis Gouvas	1	0	1
8	MF	(Cyprus) Panikos Krystallis	1	0	1
Own goals			4	0	4
Totals			69	10	79

=== Hat-tricks ===
Numbers in superscript represent the goals that the player scored.

Player	Against	Result	Date	Competition	Source
(Palestine) Ibrahim Mughrabi	(Greece) Egaleo	7–2 (H)	27 September 1962	Alpha Ethniki	
(Greece) Kostas Nestoridis	(Greece) Apollon Athens	4–3 (H)	24 March 1963	Alpha Ethniki	
(Greece) Kostas Nestoridis	(Greece) Olympiacos Kalamata	7–1 (H)	19 May 1963	Greek Cup	
(Greece) Kostas Nestoridis^{5}	(Greece) Iraklis	5–0 (H)	2 June 1963	Alpha Ethniki	

=== Clean sheets ===
As of 7 July 1963
The list is sorted by competition order when total clean sheets are equal and then alphabetically by surname. Clean sheets in games where both goalkeepers participated are awarded to the goalkeeper who started the game. Goalkeepers with no appearances are not included.

Rank	Player	Alpha Ethniki	Greek Cup	Total
1	(Greece) Stelios Serafidis	15	1	16
Totals		15	1	16

=== Disciplinary record ===
As of 7 July 1963

N	P	Nat.	Name	Alpha Ethniki			Greek Cup			Total			Notes
N	P	Nat.	Name	Yellow card	Second yellow card	Red card	Yellow card	Second yellow card	Red card	Yellow card	Second yellow card	Red card	Notes
Goalkeepers
—	GK	(Kingdom of Greece)	Stelios Serafidis										
—	GK	(Kingdom of Greece)	Vangelis Petrakis										
Defenders
—	DF	(Kingdom of Greece)	Manolis Klikopoulos										
—	DF	(Kingdom of Greece)	Giannis Marditsis										
—	DF	(Kingdom of Greece)	Petros Stamatelopoulos										
—	DF	(Kingdom of Greece)	Alekos Sofianidis										
—	DF	(Kingdom of Greece)	Mimis Anastasiadis										
—	DF	(Kingdom of Greece)	Giannis Doukas										
—	DF	(Kingdom of Greece)	Manolis Kanellopoulos										
—	DF	(Kingdom of Greece)	Theofilos Vernezis										
—	DF	(Kingdom of Greece)	Stamatis Skafidas										
Midfielders
—	MF	(Kingdom of Greece)	Miltos Papapostolou			1						1	
—	MF	(Kingdom of Greece)	Giorgos Petridis										
—	MF	(Cyprus)	Panikos Krystallis										
—	MF	(Kingdom of Greece)	Stelios Skevofilakas										
—	MF	(Kingdom of Greece)	Thanasis Gouvas										
—	MF	(Kingdom of Greece)	Sofos Koulidis										
Forwards
—	FW	(Kingdom of Greece)	Kostas Nestoridis										
—	FW	(Kingdom of Greece)	Andreas Stamatiadis										
—	FW	(Cyprus)	Dimitris Zagylos										
—	FW	(Palestine)	Ibrahim Mughrabi										
—	FW	(Kingdom of Greece)	Nikos Zagotsis										
—	FW	(Kingdom of Greece)	Aris Tsachouridis										
—	FW	(Kingdom of Greece)	Mimis Papaioannou										
—	FW	(Kingdom of Greece)	Spyros Pomonis										
—	FW	(Kingdom of Greece)	Nikos Spyropoulos										

=== Starting 11 ===
This section presents the most frequently used formation along with the players with the most starts across all competitions.

N.	Formation	Matchday(s)
36	WW	1–30

Nat.	Player	Pos.
(Greece)	Stelios Serafidis	GK
(Greece)	Manolis Kanellopoulos	RCB
(Greece)	Giannis Marditsis	CB
(Greece)	Alekos Sofianidis	LCB
(Greece)	Miltos Papapostolou	RCM
(Greece)	Stelios Skevofilakas	LCM
(Palestine)	Ibrahim Mughrabi	SS
(Greece)	Andreas Stamatiadis (C)	RW
(Greece)	Giorgos Petridis	LW
(Greece)	Kostas Nestoridis	RCF
(Greece)	Mimis Papaioannou	LCF

Last updated: 1963-07-07

== Awards ==
Player	Pos.	Award	Source
(Greece) Kostas Nestoridis	FW	Alpha Ethniki Top Scorer	
