= 1963–64 AEK Athens F.C. season =

AEK Athens
1963–64 season
- Chairman: Nikos Goumas (until 23 November); Alexandros Makridis
- Manager: Heinrich Müller
- Stadium: AEK Stadium
- Alpha Ethniki: 3rd
- Greek Cup: Winners
- European Cup: Preliminary round
- Top goalscorer: League: Mimis Papaioannou (29); All: Mimis Papaioannou (34)
- Highest home attendance: 35,000 vs Olympiacos (22 September 1963)
- Lowest home attendance: 6,573 vs Panionios (19 April 1964)
- Average home league attendance: 15,402
- Biggest win: Anagennisi Arta 0–7 AEK Athens
- Biggest defeat: Monaco 7–2 AEK Athens
Home colours

The 1963–64 season was the 40th season in the existence of AEK Athens F.C. and the fifth consecutive season in the top flight of Greek football. They competed in the Alpha Ethniki, the Greek Cup and the European Cup. The season began on 15 September 1963 and finished on 17 June 1964.

== Overview ==
In the summer of 1963, the administration of AEK Athens proceeded with a major restruction of the team's roster. The Syrian Ibrahim Mughrabi, as well as the Cypriots, Panikos Krystallis and Dimitris Zagylos returned to their homelands, while Thanasis Gouvas was among the departures. Moreover, after the first match against Monaco, Giannis Marditsis essentially withdrew from the team. Several players were signed, such as the goalkeeper, Theodoros Maniateas of Panthisiakos and Panagiotis Charalambidis of Iraklis, the striker of Atromitos, Kostas Papageorgiou and Fanis Tasinos, who emerged as the best left midfielder of the previous season at Pagkorinthiakos. Along with the renewal of the roster, the administration, to everyone's surprise, dismissed Jenő Csaknády, the manager who won them the championship in the previous season. The Austrian Heinrich Müller was appointed in his place. One of the first innovations of the new manager was to remove the main goalkeeper, Stelios Serafidis from the regular squad and establish Vangelis Petrakis.

AEK started their competitive obligations, playing for the first time in their history in the UEFA competitions, as they qualified in the preliminary round of the European Cup. The draw brought them against the French champions, Monaco. The first appearance in a UEFA match quickly turned into a nightmare as they faced an imposing 7–2 defeat at Stade Municipal du Ray. The rematch at Athens was purely procedural, as 1–1 draw couldn't change the outcome, since the qualification was secured by the Monegasques from the first match.

AEK started the championship race with three defeats and one draw, conceding 8 goals. Taking into account the heavy defeat at Monaco, as well, the huge number of goals conceded resulted in the return of Serafidis to the main squad, but they were already left behind in the title race. In the next 14 championship matches, the yellow–blacks conceded only 3 goals, 2 of which in their fourth defeat at Drama against Doxa Drama, which gave a greater advantage to the advancing Panathinaikos. AEK eventually finished in third place in the table, 13 points from the top. The 72 goals they achieved won them the best offense, while after four consecutive wins by Kostas Nestoridis, the title of the top scorer of the league "passed" to Mimis Papaioannou, who with 29 goals kept the award within the club.

In the Cup, AEK eliminated Anagennisi Arta by crushing them away from home with 7–0. The round of 16 brought AEK against PAOK again away from home. Despite the 0–0 at the regular time, the yellow-blacks got the qualification with a 3–0 after the extra time. The away matches continued in the quarter-finals, where AEK faced Proodeftiki at Karaiskakis Stadium and eliminated them by 1–0. The draw for the semi-finals brought Panathinaikos and Olympiacos against each other at Leoforos Alexandras Stadium and Pierikos against AEK at Katerini. The clearly superior AEK won 3–1 and easily advanced to the final. In the other semi-final, which was held on the same day, a derby took place that was destined to go down in history for non-competitive reasons and characterized as the "Holocaust of Leoforos". After the match ended a draw at the regular time and the relaxed tempo by the players during the second half and extra time, enraged the crowd of fans of both clubs, who were certain that the match was fixed for a replay match to be set. The crowd reacted by breaking the railings, destroying the billboards and floodlights and invading the pitch. There, they gathered all the wooden objects and set them on fire and then attacked the footballers, the referees and the managers, together and without getting involved with each other. Despite the attempts by the police, the extent of the incidents, was such that the intervention of the public prosecutor was called for. The HFF punished both clubs for the events and fearing worse incidents. Nevertheless, in the summer it was decided that the winner of the semi-final to be judjed by a draw which Olympiacos won and were to play against AEK on 26 August 1964 at Leoforos Alexandras Stadium. Eventually, Olympiacos decided not to show up for the match not wanting to line up without their footballers that were serving in the army. Thus the HFF recognized AEK, as the Cup winner, declaring them to UEFA as the country's representative for the following season's European Cup Winners' Cup. Many years later the HFF, recognizing the unjustified gap that had been created, awarded the trophy to AEK as well.

== Management team ==
Position	Staff
Manager	(Austria) Heinrich Müller
Academy director	(Greece) Georgios Daispangos
Academy manager	(Greece) Georgios Daispangos
Academy manager	(Greece) Kostas Poulis

== Players ==
=== Squad information ===
NOTE: The players are the ones that have been announced by the AEK Athens' press release. No edits should be made unless a player arrival or exit is announced. Updated 17 June 1964, 23:59 UTC+2.

Player	Nat.	Position(s)	Date of birth (Age)	Signed	Previous club	Transfer fee
Goalkeepers
Stelios Serafidis	(Greece)	GK	6 August 1935 (aged 28)	1953	(Greece) AEK Athens U20	—
Vangelis Petrakis	(Greece)	GK	7 September 1938 (aged 25)	1962	(Greece) Aris	₯500,000
Theodoros Maniateas	(Greece)	GK	19 March 1945 (aged 19)	1963	(Greece) Panthisiakos	Free
Defenders
Giannis Marditsis	(Greece)	CB / ST	19 February 1933 (aged 31)	1959	(Greece) Egaleo	₯103,000
Alekos Sofianidis	(Greece) (Turkey)	LB / LM / LW	3 August 1935 (aged 28)	1959	(Turkey) Beşiktaş	Free
Mimis Anastasiadis	(Greece)	RB / CB / ST	26 October 1936 (aged 27)	1956	(Greece) A.O. Nea Ionia	Free
Aleko Yordan	(Turkey) (Greece)	CB	10 January 1938 (aged 26)	1964	(Turkey) Beykoz	Free
Manolis Kanellopoulos	(Greece)	RB / CB	12 January 1938 (aged 26)	1962	(Greece) Egaleo	Free
Theofilos Vernezis	(Greece)	RB / CB / GK	1938 (aged 25–26)	1956	(Greece) AEK Athens U20	—
Panagiotis Charalampidis	(Greece)	CB / DM	18 July 1938 (aged 25)	1963	(Greece) Iraklis	Free
Panagiotis Stasinopoulos	(Greece)	CB	1944 (aged 19–20)	1963	(Greece) AEK Athens U20	—
Midfielders
Miltos Papapostolou	(Greece)	DM / CB	9 September 1935 (aged 28)	1956	(Greece) Egaleo	Free
Giorgos Petridis	(Greece)	AM / SS / ST / LW	10 February 1938 (aged 26)	1957	(Greece) Pera Club	Free
Stelios Skevofilakas	(Greece)	LM / RM / AM / CM	6 January 1939 (aged 25)	1961	(Greece) Eleftheroupoli	Free
Sofos Koulidis	(Greece)	CM / AM	1939 (aged 24–25)	1962	(Greece) Egaleo	Free
Emilios Theofanidis	(Greece)	CM / CB	30 November 1939 (aged 24)	1963	(Greece) Aris Ptolemaida	Free
Fanis Tasinos	(Greece)	LM / CM / LB	28 October 1940 (aged 23)	1963	(Greece) Pagkorinthiakos	₯500,000
Michalis Simigdalas	(Greece)	CM / RM / LM / RB / LB	23 June 1944 (aged 20)	1963	(Greece) AEK Athens U20	—
Forwards
Kostas Nestoridis	(Greece)	ST / SS / LW / RW	15 March 1930 (aged 34)	1955	(Greece) Panionios	Free
Andreas Stamatiadis (Captain)	(Greece)	RW / LW / SS / AM	16 August 1935 (aged 28)	1952	(Greece) AEK Athens U20	—
Aris Tsachouridis	(Greece)	LW / LM / RM / RW	10 December 1940 (aged 23)	1960	(Greece) Makedonikos	Free
Kostas Papageorgiou	(Greece)	ST / SS / RW / LW	1 January 1941 (aged 23)	1963	(Greece) Atromitos	₯200,000
Mimis Papaioannou	(Greece)	SS / ST / AM / RW	17 November 1942 (aged 21)	1962	(Greece) Veria	₯175,000
Spyros Pomonis	(Greece)	LW / LM	12 February 1944 (aged 20)	1960	(Greece) AEK Athens U20	—
Left during season
Nikos Sevastopoulos	(Greece)	RW / SS / AM / ST	26 February 1945 (aged 19)	1963	(Greece) AEK Athens U20	—

== Transfers ==
=== In ===
Pos.	Player	From	Fee	Date	Source
GK	(Greece) Theodoros Maniateas	(Greece) Panthisiakos	Free transfer	31 July 1963	
DF	(Turkey) Aleko Yordan	(Turkey) Beykoz	Free transfer	26 April 1964	
DF	(Greece) Panagiotis Charalampidis	(Greece) Iraklis	Free transfer	2 August 1963	
DF	(Greece) Panagiotis Stasinopoulos	(Greece) AEK Athens U20	Promotion	1 July 1963	
MF	(Greece) Michalis Simigdalas	(Greece) AEK Athens U20	Promotion	1 July 1963	
MF	(Greece) Emilios Theofanidis	(Greece) Aris Ptolemaida	Free transfer	31 July 1963	
MF	(Greece) Fanis Tasinos	(Greece) Pagkorinthiakos	₯500,000	17 July 1963	
MF	(Greece) Stefanos Demiris	(Greece) Panegialios	Loan return	1 August 1963	
FW	(Greece) Nikos Sevastopoulos	(Greece) AEK Athens U20	Promotion	1 July 1963	
FW	(Greece) Kostas Papageorgiou	(Greece) Atromitos	₯200,000^{[a]}	26 July 1963	

a. plus Dimitris Tzaneras and Galanakis from the reserve team as exchange.

=== Out ===
Pos.	Player	To	Fee	Date	Source
DF	(Greece) Manolis Klikopoulos	Free agent	Contract termination	1 July 1963	
DF	(Greece) Giannis Doukas	(Greece) AEK Athens U20	Demotion	1 August 1963	
DF	(Greece) Petros Stamatelopoulos	(Greece) Panachaiki	Free transfer	31 July 1963	
MF	(Greece) Thanasis Gouvas	(United States) Greek Olympic Athletic club of Chicago	Free transfer	1 July 1963	
MF	(Cyprus) Panikos Krystallis	(Cyprus) Apollon Limassol	Free transfer	13 November 1963	
FW	(Cyprus) Dimitris Zagylos	(Cyprus) Anorthosis Famagusta	Free transfer	13 August 1963	
FW	(Palestine) Ibrahim Mughrabi	(United Arab Republic) Al Ahli	Free transfer	16 August 1963	
FW	(Greece) Nikos Zagotsis	(Greece) Panachaiki	Free transfer	31 July 1963	
FW	(Greece) Nikos Spyropoulos	(Greece) AEK Athens U20	Demotion	1 August 1963	

=== Loan out ===
Pos.	Player	To	Fee	Date	Until	Option to buy	Source
DF	(Greece) Stamatis Skafidas	(Greece) Panegialios	Free	1 August 1963	30 June 1964	✗	
MF	(Greece) Stefanos Demiris	(Greece) Aris	Free	1 September 1963	30 June 1964	✗	
FW	(Greece) Nikos Sevastopoulos	(South Africa) Hellenic	Free	22 April 1964	8 November 1964	✗	

=== Overall transfer activity ===
Expenditure: ▼ ₯700,000

Income: ▲ ₯0

Net Total: ▼ ₯700,000

== Pre-season and friendlies ==
12 July 1963 Friendly	AEK Athens	3–0	AEK Athens U20	Nea Filadelfeia
17:00 EET (UTC+2)	Stamatiadis; Ibrahim	Report		Stadium: AEK Stadium; Attendance: 5,000
Note: Fouad Abu Ghaida, Tessi, Terri Piermattei and an unknown Cypriot footballer competed with the youth team.

24 August 1963 Friendly	AEK Athens	10–0	Neapoli Piraeus	Nea Filadelfeia
17:15 EET (UTC+2)	Nestoridis 14', 24', 89'; Papaioannou 30', 43', 65', 68', 75', 84'; Papageorgiou 87'	Report		Stadium: AEK Stadium; Attendance: 8,000

28 August 1963 Friendly	AEK Athens	1–0	Panegialios	Nea Filadelfeia
17:15 EET (UTC+2)	Tsachouridis 46'	Report		Stadium: AEK Stadium; Referee: Vattas

31 August 1963 Friendly	AEK Athens	5–0	Pampeniakos	Nea Filadelfeia
17:15 EET (UTC+2)	Sevastopoulos; Karafeskos; Simigdalas; Pomonis	Report		Stadium: AEK Stadium

1 September 1963 Friendly	Rodiakos	3–3	AEK Athens	Rhodes
	Neskis 15'; Zounis 41'; Marinos 69'	Report	Nestoridis 14' (pen.), 85'; Papageorgiou 54'	Stadium: Diagoras Stadium; Attendance: 5,000; Referee: Kostas Xanthos (Dodecanese)

4 September 1963 Friendly	AEK Athens	5–1	Hapoel Petah Tikva	Nea Filadelfeia
17:15 EET (UTC+2)	Papaioannou 2'; Nestoridis 29'; Stamatiadis 63', 77'; Papageorgiou 88'	Report	Mansur 72'	Stadium: AEK Stadium; Attendance: 10,000; Referee: Koulouvardis (Athens)

8 September 1963 Athletic Echo Cup	AEK Athens	3–2	Olympiacos	Nea Filadelfeia
17:00 EET (UTC+2)	Papageorgiou 2'; Nestoridis 15'; Sofianidis 75'	Report	Neofotistos 56'; Sideris 62'	Stadium: AEK Stadium; Attendance: 25,619; Referee: Giannis Kalofysoudis (Athens)

11 September 1963 Friendly	AEK Athens	0–2	Fostiras	Nea Filadelfeia
21:15 EET (UTC+2)		Report	Georgiou 41'; Ventouris 66'	Stadium: AEK Stadium; Referee: Tsatsoglou

6 November 1964 Friendly	AEK Athens	1–0	Olympiacos	Nea Filadelfeia
	Stamatiadis 75'			Stadium: AEK Stadium

11 December 1963 Friendly	AEK Athens	4–1	Daring Club Motema Pembe	Nea Filadelfeia
	Goal		Goal	Stadium: AEK Stadium

27 December 1963 Friendly	AEK Athens	1–1	Bucharest XI	Nea Filadelfeia
15:00 EET (UTC+2)	Tsachouridis 57'		85'	Stadium: AEK Stadium

3 January 1964 Friendly	AEK Athens	3–0	Panathinaikos	Nea Filadelfeia
	Theofanidis 44', 72'; Petridis 86'			Stadium: AEK Stadium; Attendance: 8,423; Referee: Epaminondas Chatzinikolaou (Athens)

6 January 1964 Friendly	AEK Athens	6–1	Olympiacos	Nea Filadelfeia
	Stamatiadis 4', 28'; Papaioannou 6'; Nestoridis 10'; Papageorgiou 85'; Petridis 89'	Report	Psychos 45'	Stadium: AEK Stadium; Attendance: 16,127; Referee: Tsatsoglou

5 February 1964 Friendly	AEK Athens	0–0	Austria Wien	Nea Filadelfeia
15:30 EET (UTC+2)				Stadium: AEK Stadium

26 February 1964 Charity match	AEK Athens	2–1	Panegialios	Nea Filadelfeia
	Pomonis 45'; Karafeskos 80' (pen.)		Aganian 19'	Stadium: AEK Stadium; Attendance: 1,500; Referee: Chalyvas
Note: The match was made for the financial support of the footballer of Panegialios and former footballer of AEK, Antonis Gavanas who had been diagnosed with a tuberculosis and was hospitalized in a sanatorium.

19 April 1964 Friendly	AO Ioannina	0–1	AEK Athens	Ioannina
			Sevastopoulos 6'	Stadium: Zosimades Stadium

26 April 1964 Friendly	Thyella Patras	1–1	AEK Athens	Patras
	Zafiropoulos 15'		Nestoridis 67'	Stadium: Panachaiki Stadium; Referee: Kournoutos

10 June 1964 Friendly	AEK Athens	3–2	Ethiopia	Nea Filadelfeia
17:30 EET (UTC+2)	Papaioannou 5'; Nestoridis 62'; Demiris 65'	Report	Menguistou 20'; Guetachew 68'	Stadium: AEK Stadium; Attendance: 3,724; Referee: Giannis Zogas (Athens)

21 June 1964 Friendly	AEK Athens	6–1	Ethnikos Piraeus	Nea Filadelfeia
17:45 EET (UTC+2)	Nestoridis 16', 17', 35', 80'; Stamatiadis 63'; Papageorgiou 70'	Report	Antonatos 12'	Stadium: AEK Stadium; Referee: Tsatsoglou

28 June 1964 Friendly	Chios XI	2–2	AEK Athens	Chios
	Koutsodontis 10'; Peppas 85'	Report	Theofanidis 30'; Nestoridis 65'	Stadium: Chios Municipal Stadium; Attendance: 2,000; Referee: Loukis

== Competitions ==
=== Overall record ===
Competition	First match	Last match	Starting round	Final position	Record							
Competition	First match	Last match	Starting round	Final position	Pld	W	D	L	GF	GA	GD	Win %
Alpha Ethniki	15 September 1963	31 May 1964	Matchday 1	3rd	30	18	5	7	72	25	+47	60.00
Greek Cup	26 April 1964	17 June 1964	Round of 32	Winners	4	4	0	0	14	1	+13	100.00
European Cup	18 September 1963	2 October 1963	Preliminary round	Preliminary round	2	0	1	1	3	8	−5	0.00
Total					36	22	6	8	89	34	+55	61.11

Last updated: 2 October 1963
Source: Competitions

=== Alpha Ethniki ===
==== League table ====
Pos	Team	Pld	W	D	L	GF	GA	GD	Pts	Qualification or relegation
1	Panathinaikos (C)	30	24	6	0	67	19	+48	84	Qualification for European Cup preliminary round
2	Olympiacos	30	20	7	3	62	17	+45	77	
3	AEK Athens	30	18	5	7	72	25	+47	71	Qualification for Cup Winners' Cup first round
4	Panionios	30	12	9	9	48	31	+17	63	
5	Apollon Athens	30	13	7	10	41	36	+5	63	

Source: RSSSF
Rules for classification: 1st points; 2nd decision match; 3rd head-to-head goal ratio.
(C) Champions

==== Results summary ====
Overall								Home						Away					
Pld	W	D	L	GF	GA	GD	Pts	W	D	L	GF	GA	GD	W	D	L	GF	GA	GD
30	18	5	7	72	25	+47	71	13	0	2	48	6	+42	5	5	5	24	19	+5

Source: Competitive matches

==== Results by Matchday ====
Round	1	2	3	4	5	6	7	8	9	10	11	12	13	14	15	16	17	18	19	20	21	22	23	24	25	26	27	28	29	30
Ground	A	H	A	A	A	H	A	H	A	H	H	H	A	H	H	H	A	H	H	H	A	Η	A	H	A	A	A	H	A	A
Result	L	L	L	D	D	W	W	W	L	W	W	W	W	W	W	W	L	L	W	W	L	W	W	W	D	D	W	W	W	D
Position	11	13	15	15	13	11	9	6	8	8	6	3	3	3	3	3	3	3	3	3	3	3	3	3	3	3	3	3	3	3

Source: Competitive matches
A = Away; H = Home; W = Win; D = Draw; L = Loss; P = Postponed

==== Matches ====
15 September 1963 1	PAOK	1–0	AEK Athens	Thessaloniki
10:00 EET (UTC+2)	Mouratidis 32'			Stadium: Toumba Stadium; Attendance: 19,912; Referee: Petros Tzouvaras (Thessaly)

22 September 1963 2	AEK Athens	0–2	Olympiacos	Nea Filadelfeia
16:15 EET (UTC+2)	Papapostolou (red card) 88'		Sideris 44', 90+5'	Stadium: AEK Stadium; Attendance: 34,364; Referee: Gerhard Schulenburg (West Germany)

29 September 1963 3	Panathinaikos	5–4	AEK Athens	Ampelokipoi
16:15 EET (UTC+2)	Domazos 14', 39' (pen.); Stamatiadis 45+2' (o.g.); Panagiotidis 50'; Panakis 58'		Kanellopoulos 3'; Papaioannou 5', 82'; Nestoridis 37'	Stadium: Leoforos Alexandras Stadium; Attendance: 24,550; Referee: Mostafa Mansour (Egypt)

6 October 1963 4	Apollon Kalamarias	0–0	AEK Athens	Thessaloniki
15:30 EET (UTC+2)				Stadium: Aris Stadium; Attendance: 3,613; Referee: Aaron Werner (Israel)

13 October 1963 5	Iraklis	0–0	AEK Athens	Thessaloniki
15:15 EET (UTC+2)				Stadium: Kaftanzoglio Stadium; Attendance: 7,190; Referee: Giannos Angelis (Cyprus)

20 October 1963 6	AEK Athens	3–0	Aris	Nea Filadelfeia
15:15 EET (UTC+2)	Papaioannou 9', 70', 78'			Stadium: AEK Stadium; Attendance: 13,800; Referee: Renzo Righetti (Italy)

13 November 1963 7	Olympiacos Chalkida	0–4	AEK Athens	Chalcis
15:00 EET (UTC+2)			Tasinos 50'; Papaioannou 69', 88'; Nestoridis 85'	Stadium: Municipal Stadium of Chalkida; Attendance: 5,726; Referee: Andrei Rădulescu (Romania)

10 November 1963 8	AEK Athens	4–0	Apollon Athens	Nea Filadelfeia
15:00 EET (UTC+2)	Papageorgiou 7', 50'; Papaioannou 20', 69'			Stadium: AEK Stadium; Attendance: 15,648; Referee: Mustafa Rashid Ramzy (Egypt)

17 November 1963 9	Doxa Drama	2–1	AEK Athens	Drama
15:00 EET (UTC+2)	Tsokataridis 31'; Chatzimichail 72'		Papageorgiou 53'	Stadium: Doxa Drama Stadium; Attendance: 5,444; Referee: Menachem Ashkenazi (Israel)

24 November 1963 10	AEK Athens	4–0	Panegialios	Nea Filadelfeia
15:00 EET (UTC+2)	Pomonis 32', 64'; Papaioannou 42'; Papageorgiou 80'			Stadium: Nikos Goumas Stadium; Attendance: 9,990; Referee: Giannis Zogas (Athens)

1 December 1963 11	AEK Athens	6–0	Niki Volos	Nea Filadelfeia
15:00 EET (UTC+2)	Nestoridis 20'; Zanteroglou 63' (o.g.); Papageorgiou 77', 88'; Tasinos 78'; Papaioannou 82'			Stadium: AEK Stadium; Attendance: 8,180; Referee: Aristidis Lekkas (Piraeus)

8 December 1963 12	AEK Athens	4–0	Ethnikos Piraeus	Nea Filadelfeia
15:00 EET (UTC+2)	Nestoridis 39'; Papaioannou 54', 59', 77'			Stadium: AEK Stadium; Attendance: 15,787; Referee: Ivan Danev (Bulgaria)

15 December 1963 13	Panionios	0–1	AEK Athens	Nea Smyrni
15:00 EET (UTC+2)			Papageorgiou 21'	Stadium: Nea Smyrni Stadium; Attendance: 12,317; Referee: Atanas Stavrev Kiryakov (Bulgaria)

22 December 1963 14	AEK Athens	3–0	Egaleo	Nea Filadelfeia
15:00 EET (UTC+2)	Papageorgiou 3'; Nestoridis 30'; Papaioannou 46'			Stadium: AEK Stadium; Attendance: 13,837; Referee: Cornel Niţescu (Romania)

29 December 1963 15	AEK Athens	5–0	Pierikos	Nea Filadelfeia
15:00 EET (UTC+2)	Pomonis 28'; Papaioannou 47'; Nestoridis 52', 87'; Tasinos 86'			Stadium: AEK Stadium; Attendance: 9,922; Referee: Subhy Nusseir (Egypt)

12 January 1964 16	AEK Athens	3–1	PAOK	Nea Filadelfeia
15:00 EET (UTC+2)	Papaioannou 33', 74'; Nestoridis 35'		Giakoumis 66'	Stadium: AEK Stadium; Attendance: 18,762; Referee: Antonio Sbardella (Italy)

1 April 1964 17	Olympiacos	3–0	AEK Athens	Nea Filadelfeia
16:30 EET (UTC+2)	Grigoriadis 25', 39'; Papazoglou 50'			Stadium: AEK Stadium; Attendance: 34,912; Referee: Kurt Tschenscher (West Germany)

15 April 1964 18	AEK Athens	0–1	Panathinaikos	Nea Filadelfeia
16:30 EET (UTC+2)			Loukanidis 54'	Stadium: AEK Stadium; Attendance: 34,825; Referee: Werner Treichel (West Germany)

2 February 1964 19	AEK Athens	2–0	Apollon Kalamarias	Nea Filadelfeia
15:30 EET (UTC+2)	Papageorgiou 38'; Nestoridis 80'			Stadium: AEK Stadium; Attendance: 13,932; Referee: Vladimir Stanković (Yugoslavia)

9 February 1964 20	AEK Athens	4–0	Iraklis	Nea Filadelfeia
15:00 EET (UTC+2)	Papageorgiou 10'; Papaioannou 23', 90'; Nestoridis 53'			Stadium: AEK Stadium; Attendance: 13,614; Referee: Borče Nedelkovski (Yugoslavia)

23 February 1964 21	Aris	2–0	AEK Athens	Thessaloniki
15:00 EET (UTC+2)	Demiris 7', 27'			Stadium: Aris Stadium; Attendance: 10,678; Referee: Andrei Rădulescu (Romania)
Note: AEK fielded a 10-man squad in the 2nd half, after Nestoridis left the pitch, having played with an injury since the 3rd minute of the match.

1 March 1964 22	AEK Athens	4–0	Olympiacos Chalkida	Nea Filadelfeia
16:00 EET (UTC+2)	Tasinos 12'; Papageorgiou 15', 74'; Skevofilakas 22' (pen.)			Stadium: AEK Stadium; Attendance: 8,391; Referee: Anton Bucheli (Switzerland)

15 March 1964 23	Apollon Athens	0–3	AEK Athens	Rizoupoli
16:00 EET (UTC+2)			Papaioannou 8', 60'; Papageorgiou 67'	Stadium: Rizoupoli Stadium; Attendance: 10,904; Referee: Gottfried Dienst (Switzerland)

22 March 1964 24	AEK Athens	2–0	Doxa Drama	Nea Filadelfeia
16:00 EET (UTC+2)	Pomonis 36'; Papaioannou 76'			Stadium: AEK Stadium; Attendance: 12,715; Referee: Todorov (Bulgaria)

29 March 1964 25	Panegialios	1–1	AEK Athens	Aigio
16:30 EET (UTC+2)	Zafiropoulos 55'		Papageorgiou 75'	Stadium: Aigio National Stadium; Attendance: 4,120; Referee: Aristeidis Lekkas (Piraeus)

5 April 1964 26	Niki Volos	2–2	AEK Athens	Volos
10:00 EET (UTC+2)	Kostopoulos 53'; Gerolimatos 89'		Papageorgiou 69'; Papaioannou 85'	Stadium: Niki Volos Stadium; Attendance: 5,000; Referee: Heffler (Austria)

11 April 1964 27	Ethnikos Piraeus	2–4	AEK Athens	Piraeus
16:30 EET (UTC+2)	Antonatos 49'; Chatziioannidis 76'		Papaioannou 7'; Petridis 17'; Papageorgiou 30', 50'; Skevofilakas (penalty missed) 82'	Stadium: Karaiskakis Stadium; Attendance: 8,599; Referee: Atanas Stavrev Kiryakov (Bulgaria)

19 April 1964 28	AEK Athens	4–2	Panionios	Nea Filadelfeia
16:30 EET (UTC+2)	Papageorgiou 5', 30'; Papaioannou 15', 80' (pen.)		Dedes 29'; Saravakos 33'	Stadium: AEK Stadium; Attendance: 6,573; Referee: Giannis Zogas (Athens)

17 May 1964 29	Egaleo	0–3	AEK Athens	Ampelokipoi
17:00 EET (UTC+2)			Stamatiadis 12'; Papaioannou 39'; Papageorgiou 75'	Stadium: Leoforos Alexandras Stadium; Attendance: 1,925; Referee: Petros Tzouvaras (Thessaly)

31 May 1964 30	Pierikos	1–1	AEK Athens	Katerini
17:30 EET (UTC+2)	Sidiropoulos 54'		Papaioannou 26'	Stadium: Katerini Stadium; Attendance: 5,000; Referee: Alexandros Monastiriotis (Piraeus)

=== Greek Cup ===
AEK entered the Greek Cup at the round of 32.

==== Matches ====
26 April 1964 Round of 32	Anagennisi Arta	0–7	AEK Athens	Arta
16:00 EET (UTC+2)	Skouras (red card)		Papageorgiou 18', 67'; Papaioannou 30', 49', 78'; Petridis 40'; Stamatiadis 87'	Stadium: Arta Stadium; Attendance: 5,000; Referee: Alexandros Monastiriotis (Piraeus)

24 May 1964 Round of 16	PAOK	0–3 (a.e.t.)	AEK Athens	Thessaloniki
16:30 EET (UTC+2)			Nestoridis 96'; Papaioannou 109'; Petridis 110'	Stadium: Toumba Stadium; Attendance: 9,061

3 June 1964 Quarter-finals	Proodeftiki	0–1	AEK Athens	Piraeus
17:00 EET (UTC+2)			Nestoridis 87'	Stadium: Karaiskakis Stadium; Attendance: 20,000; Referee: Andreas Kouniaidis (Cyprus)

17 June 1964 Semi-finals	Pierikos	1–3	AEK Athens	Katerini
17:00 EET (UTC+2)	Amanatidis 85'		Papaioannou 4'; Nestoridis 45', 76'	Stadium: Katerini Stadium; Attendance: 5,000; Referee: Anton Bucheli (Switzerland)

As Panathinaikos and Olympiacos were ejected from the competition, the final was scratched and AEK Athens were awarded the cup.

=== European Cup ===
==== Preliminary round ====
18 September 1963 First leg	Monaco (France)	7–2	(Greece) AEK Athens	Nice, France
16:30 EET (UTC+2)	Cossou 9', 31', 42', 57'; Douis 17', 87'; Dijbrill 22'	Report	Nestoridis 80'; Tasinos 82'	Stadium: Stade Municipal du Ray; Attendance: 13,406; Referee: Raoul Righi (Italy)
Note: First ever UEFA game for AEK.

2 October 1963 Second leg	AEK Athens (Greece)	1–1 (3–8 agg.)	(France) Monaco	Athens, Greece
16:00 EET (UTC+2)	Theofanidis 66'	Report	Theo 89' (pen.)	Stadium: AEK Stadium; Attendance: 12,660; Referee: Gino Rigato (Italy)

== Statistics ==
=== Squad statistics ===
As of 17 June 1964

No.	Pos	Player	Alpha Ethniki		Greek Cup		European Cup		Total	
No.	Pos	Player	Apps	Goals	Apps	Goals	Apps	Goals	Apps	Goals
Goalkeepers
—	GK	(Kingdom of Greece) Stelios Serafidis	26	0	4	0	1	0	31	0
—	GK	(Kingdom of Greece) Vangelis Petrakis	4	0	0	0	1	0	5	0
—	GK	(Kingdom of Greece) Theodoros Maniateas	0	0	0	0	0	0	0	0
Defenders
—	DF	(Kingdom of Greece) Giannis Marditsis	0	0	0	0	1	0	1	0
—	DF	(Kingdom of Greece) Alekos Sofianidis	24	0	4	0	1	0	29	0
—	DF	(Kingdom of Greece) Mimis Anastasiadis	2	0	2	0	0	0	4	0
—	DF	(Turkey) Aleko Yordan	2	0	3	0	0	0	5	0
—	DF	(Kingdom of Greece) Manolis Kanellopoulos	22	1	1	0	2	0	25	1
—	DF	(Kingdom of Greece) Theofilos Vernezis	9	0	1	0	0	0	10	0
—	DF	(Kingdom of Greece) Panagiotis Charalampidis	3	0	0	0	1	0	4	0
—	DF	(Kingdom of Greece) Panagiotis Stasinopoulos	3	0	0	0	0	0	3	0
Midfielders
—	MF	(Kingdom of Greece) Miltos Papapostolou	28	0	4	0	2	0	34	0
—	MF	(Kingdom of Greece) Giorgos Petridis	13	1	4	2	2	0	19	3
—	MF	(Kingdom of Greece) Stelios Skevofilakas	29	1	4	0	2	0	35	1
—	MF	(Kingdom of Greece) Sofos Koulidis	0	0	0	0	0	0	0	0
—	MF	(Kingdom of Greece) Emilios Theofanidis	5	0	0	0	2	1	7	1
—	MF	(Kingdom of Greece) Fanis Tasinos	24	4	1	0	2	1	27	5
—	MF	(Kingdom of Greece) Michalis Simigdalas	1	0	0	0	0	0	1	0
Forwards
—	FW	(Kingdom of Greece) Kostas Nestoridis	24	10	3	4	2	1	29	15
—	FW	(Kingdom of Greece) Andreas Stamatiadis	29	1	4	1	1	0	34	2
—	FW	(Kingdom of Greece) Aris Tsachouridis	7	0	0	0	0	0	7	0
—	FW	(Kingdom of Greece) Kostas Papageorgiou	25	20	4	2	0	0	29	22
—	FW	(Kingdom of Greece) Mimis Papaioannou	28	29	4	5	1	0	33	34
—	FW	(Kingdom of Greece) Spyros Pomonis	21	4	1	0	1	0	23	4
Left during season
—	FW	(Kingdom of Greece) Nikos Sevastopoulos	1	0	0	0	0	0	1	0

=== Goalscorers ===
As of 17 June 1964
The list is sorted by competition order when total goals are equal, then by position and then alphabetically by surname.

Rank	Pos.	Player	Alpha Ethniki	Greek Cup	European Cup	Total
1	FW	(Greece) Mimis Papaioannou	29	5	0	34
2	FW	(Greece) Kostas Papageorgiou	20	2	0	22
3	FW	(Greece) Kostas Nestoridis	10	4	1	15
4	MF	(Greece) Fanis Tasinos	4	0	1	5
5	FW	(Greece) Spyros Pomonis	4	0	0	4
6	MF	(Greece) Giorgos Petridis	1	2	0	3
7	FW	(Greece) Andreas Stamatiadis	1	1	0	2
8	DF	(Greece) Manolis Kanellopoulos	1	0	0	1
8	MF	(Greece) Stelios Skevofilakas	1	0	0	1
8	MF	(Greece) Emilios Theofanidis	0	0	1	1
Own goals			1	0	0	1
Totals			72	14	3	89

=== Hat-tricks ===
Numbers in superscript represent the goals that the player scored.

Player	Against	Result	Date	Competition	Source
(Greece) Mimis Papaioannou	(Greece) Aris	3–0 (H)	20 October 1963	Alpha Ethniki	
(Greece) Mimis Papaioannou	(Greece) Ethnikos Piraeus	4–0 (H)	8 December 1963	Alpha Ethniki	
(Greece) Mimis Papaioannou	(Greece) Anagennisi Arta	7–0 (Α)	26 April 1964	Greek Cup	

=== Clean sheets ===
As of 17 June 1964
The list is sorted by competition order when total clean sheets are equal and then alphabetically by surname. Clean sheets in games where both goalkeepers participated are awarded to the goalkeeper who started the game. Goalkeepers with no appearances are not included.

Rank	Player	Alpha Ethniki	Greek Cup	European Cup	Total
1	(Greece) Stelios Serafidis	17	3	0	20
2	(Greece) Vangelis Petrakis	0	0	0	9
Totals		17	3	0	20

=== Disciplinary record ===
As of 17 June 1964

N	P	Nat.	Name	Alpha Ethniki			Greek Cup			European Cup			Total			Notes
N	P	Nat.	Name	Yellow card	Second yellow card	Red card	Yellow card	Second yellow card	Red card	Yellow card	Second yellow card	Red card	Yellow card	Second yellow card	Red card	Notes
Goalkeepers
—	GK	(Kingdom of Greece)	Stelios Serafidis													
—	GK	(Kingdom of Greece)	Vangelis Petrakis													
—	GK	(Kingdom of Greece)	Theodoros Maniateas													
Defenders
—	DF	(Kingdom of Greece)	Giannis Marditsis													
—	DF	(Kingdom of Greece)	Alekos Sofianidis													
—	DF	(Kingdom of Greece)	Mimis Anastasiadis													
—	DF	(Turkey)	Aleko Yordan													
—	DF	(Kingdom of Greece)	Manolis Kanellopoulos													
—	DF	(Kingdom of Greece)	Theofilos Vernezis													
—	DF	(Kingdom of Greece)	Panagiotis Charalampidis													
—	DF	(Kingdom of Greece)	Panagiotis Stasinopoulos													
Midfielders
—	MF	(Kingdom of Greece)	Miltos Papapostolou			1									1	
—	MF	(Kingdom of Greece)	Giorgos Petridis													
—	MF	(Kingdom of Greece)	Stelios Skevofilakas													
—	MF	(Kingdom of Greece)	Sofos Koulidis													
—	MF	(Kingdom of Greece)	Emilios Theofanidis													
—	MF	(Kingdom of Greece)	Fanis Tasinos													
—	MF	(Kingdom of Greece)	Michalis Simigdalas													
Forwards
—	FW	(Kingdom of Greece)	Kostas Nestoridis													
—	FW	(Kingdom of Greece)	Andreas Stamatiadis													
—	FW	(Kingdom of Greece)	Aris Tsachouridis													
—	FW	(Kingdom of Greece)	Kostas Papageorgiou													
—	FW	(Kingdom of Greece)	Mimis Papaioannou													
—	FW	(Kingdom of Greece)	Spyros Pomonis													
Left during season
—	FW	(Kingdom of Greece)	Nikos Sevastopoulos													

=== Starting 11 ===
This section presents the most frequently used formation along with the players with the most starts across all competitions.

N.	Formation	Matchday(s)
36	WW	1–30

Nat.	Player	Pos.
(Greece)	Stelios Serafidis	GK
(Greece)	Manolis Kanellopoulos	RCB
(Greece)	Miltos Papapostolou	CB
(Greece)	Alekos Sofianidis	LCB
(Greece)	Fanis Tasinos	RCM
(Greece)	Stelios Skevofilakas	LCM
(Greece)	Kostas Papageorgiou	SS
(Greece)	Andreas Stamatiadis (C)	RW
(Greece)	Spyros Pomonis	LW
(Greece)	Kostas Nestoridis	RCF
(Greece)	Mimis Papaioannou	LCF

Last updated: 1964-06-17

== Awards ==
Player	Pos.	Award	Source
(Greece) Mimis Papaioannou	FW	Alpha Ethniki Top Scorer	
