= Manolis Kanellopoulos =

Greek footballer and manager (1938–2017)

- Manolis Kanellopoulos with AEK Athens

Personal information
- Full name: Emmanouil Kanellopoulos
- Date of birth: 12 January 1938
- Place of birth: Aigaleo, Athens, Greece
- Date of death: 10 September 2017 (aged 79)
- Place of death: Aigaleo, Athens, Greece
- Position: Defender

Youth career
- –1956: Egaleo

Senior career*
Years	Team	Apps	(Gls)
1956–1962	Egaleo	76	(12)
1962–1965	AEK Athens	55	(1)
1965–1967	Egaleo	46	(4)
1968–1969	Atromitos		
Total		177	(17)
- * Club domestic league appearances and goals

Manolis Kanellopoulos (Greek: Μανώλης Κανελλόπουλος; 12 January 1938 – 10 September 2017) was a Greek professional footballer who played as a defender and later a manager.

== Club career ==
Kanellopoulos started playing football at a young age and soon joined the infrastructure departments of his local club, Egaleo. He became a key member of the youth team of the club and in 1956 at the age of 18 he competed for the first time with the senior team in the first division of the AFCA league. He established himself as the main players in the defence of the club for the following six seasons, winning two consecutive local championships and playing in the newly established second national division, helping his team to win promotion to the first national division in 1961. The following season, his tall and athletic body structure combined with his remarkable technical qualities and strong legs that allowed him to unleash medicinal straight shots as he covered the position of the right wing-back with particular success did not go unnoticed by the big clubs that met him as an opponent. The desire of the president of AEK Athens, Nikos Goumas in signing Kanellopoulos proved to be the most effective of all. Thus, on 31 July 1962, he was transferred to AEK alongside his teammate, Sofos Koulidis.

With the yellow-blacks, he played for three seasons being mostly one of their main defenders. He even made it in to the qualifying phase of the European Cup playing in both matches against Monaco. During his spell in the club he won a championship title in 1963 and a Greek Cup in 1964. A serious injury in 1964 prevented him from being more involved in his last season and eventually forced him to leave the club in the summer of 1965, returning to Egaleo.

He played with the club of Aigaleo for two more seasons in the first division before leaving in the summer of 1967. Afterwards he moved to Atromitos and competed in the second division, finishing his career in 1969.

== After football ==
After the end of his career as a football player Kanellopoulos was involved in coaching, working as a manager in various small provincial clubs until 1980, when he stopped his involvement in football. He also participated in some events of the Veterans Association of AEK Athens.

== Personal life ==
Kanellopoulos lived permanently in Aigaleo, was married and had two sons. He died on 10 September 2017 at the age of 79.

== Honours ==
Egaleo

- AFCA league: 1959–60, 1960–61

AEK Athens

- Alpha Ethniki: 1962–63
- Greek Cup: 1963–64
