= Nikos Zagotsis =

Greek footballer and coach (1940–2022)

- Nikos Zagotsis with AEK Athens suit

Personal information
- Full name: Nikolaos Zagotsis
- Date of birth: 16 March 1940
- Place of birth: Perama, Athens, Greece
- Date of death: 25 June 2022 (aged 82)
- Place of death: Salamina, Greece
- Position: Forward

Youth career
- –1958: AE Perama
- 1958–1960: AEK Athens

Senior career*
Years	Team	Apps	(Gls)
1960–1963	AEK Athens	2	(0)
1963–1965	Panachaiki		
1965	Aias Salamina		

Managerial career
- 1969–1970: Iraklis Psachna
- 1971–1972: Iraklis Psachna
- 1972–1973: Propontis Chalkida
- 1974–1975: Peramaikos
- * Club domestic league appearances and goals

Nikos Zagotsis (Greek: Νίκος Ζαγκώτσης; 16 March 1940 – 25 June 2022) was a Greek professional footballer who played as a forward and later a manager.

== Club career ==
Zagotsis started playing football in the youth teams of AE Perama. In 1958, alongside his graduation from the Ionideios School of Piraeus, he was transferred to AEK Athens, under the presidency of Nikos Goumas. He became a member of their infrastructure departments of the club until 1960, when he was promoted to the men's team.

An attacker with a highly developed sense of the goal, Zagotsis had the misfortune of being a teammate of the great scorer, Kostas Nestoridis, resulting in spending the most of his time at his career in AEK as a back-up choice and since the substitutions were prohibited during the match at the time, he was deprived of the possibility of more appearances. He scored a hat-trick in his only appearance in the Cup on 15 March 1961 in a 8–1 home win against Niki Plakas. Despite being overshadowed by "Nestoras", in the summer of 1962 Zagotsis took the opportunity of the punishment of Nestoridis by the then coach, Jenő Csaknády, due to his late arrival for a friendly match against Panegialios and by replacing him, he scored all 5 AEK in the 5–3 home win on 18 August. The punishment of Nestoridis also gave Zagotsis the opportunity to compete a few days later in the friendly match against Barcelona at the Camp Nou. The match took place on 25 August as a rematch of the friendly that had preceded against the "blaugrana" for the inauguration of the AEK Stadium. AEK experienced a heavy defeat in the hands of Barça by 6–1 with Zagotsis scoring the only goal for his team and went down in history as the first Greek to score at the ground of Barcelona. With AEK he won the Championship in 1963, despite him not making any appearances.

In the summer of 1963, he moved to Panachaiki, who were then competing in the second division and in his first season he emerged as the top scorer of his group with 18 goals, finishing at the top of the table. On 29 July 1965, he was transferred to the newly promoted second division-side, Aias Salamina, where played until December of the same year. Then he was hired after passing the exams he took at the National Bank of Greece and was appointed in Larissa. The difficulty of commuting forced him to end his football career at the age of just 25.

== Managerial career ==
In 1970, five years after his retirement as a footballer, Zagotsis attended the Coaching School of the HFF and obtained a coaching certificate. Combining his work at the bank and his coaching career, when he was transferred to Chalkida in 1971, he took over as the manager of Iraklis Psachna. In 1972 he managed Propontis Chalkida until 1973. His next transfer to Nikaia in 1974 helped him take over as coach at Peramaikos where he spent a season, winning the Piraeus FCA League.

== Personal life ==
Zagotsis was married to Maria Giannouli and together they had three children, six grandchildren and two great-grandchildren. His last transfer with the bank brought him to the department of Salamina, where he lived permanently since 1980, and after serving for many years as the manager of the local branch until 1995, when he retired. Zagotsis watched his beloved AEK incessantly until his death on 25 June 2022, at the age of 82.

== Honours ==
=== As a player ===
AEK Athens

- Alpha Ethniki: 1962–63

Panachaiki

- Beta Ethniki: 1963–64 (Group A)

Individual

- Beta Ethniki top scorer: 1963–64 (Group A)

=== As a manager ===
Peramaikos

- Piraeus FCA League: 1974–75
