= Aris Tsachouridis =

Greek footballer (born 1940)

Personal information
- Full name: Aris Tsachouridis
- Date of birth: 10 December 1940 (age 85)
- Place of birth: Greece
- Position: Forward

Youth career
- –1959: PAO Diikitirio

Senior career*
Years	Team	Apps	(Gls)
1959–1960	Makedonikos		
1960–1964	AEK Athens	47	(12)
1964–1968	Proodeftiki		
1968–1970	AO Koropi		
1970–1971	Leonidas Sparta		

International career
1962–1963	Greece military	7	(5)
1963	Greece	1	(0)

Managerial career
- 1974–1975: Petralona
- 1979–1980: Panthisiakos
Medal record
Men's football
Representing Greece
World Military Cup
Winner	1962
Winner	1963
- * Club domestic league appearances and goals

Aris Tsachouridis (Greek: Άρης Τσαχουρίδης; born 10 December 1940) is a former Greek professional footballer who played as a forward.

== Club career ==
Tsachouridis started football at PAO Diikitirio and in 1959 he joined Makedonikos in Thessaloniki, where he played for a season before singing for AEK Athens in the summer of 1960.

With the yellow–blacks, he played for four seasons winning a championship in 1963 and a Greek Cup in 1964. He scored his first goal with the club on 27 November 1960 in a 4–2 home win over Ethnikos Piraeus, while on 26 April 1961 he scored his team's only goal in the 5–1 away defeat in the hands of Fenerbahçe. In the summer of 1964, Tsachouridis was moved to Proodeftiki as an exchange for the transfer of Fotis Balopoulos to AEK.

At Proodeftiki, he competed for 4 another four seasons in the first division He then played for two years at AO Koropi, winning the promotion in the second division in his first season and in the summer of 1970 he was released. He continued at Leonidas Sparta, where he ended his football career in the summer of 1971.

== International career ==
Tsachouridis was an executive of the Greek military team and he won the World Military Cup in 1962 and 1963.

Tsachouridis appeared once with Greece in 1963. He did so on 22 May 1963 in a friendly 4–0 away defeat against Poland, under his former manager at AEK, Tryfon Tzanetis, he started the match being replaced by Leandros at half-time.

== After football ==
Tsachouridis was the main scout and the opponent's tactical analyst for AEK Athens in the staff of Dušan Bajević in the late 80's and in the 90's. He is one of the founding members of the Veterans Association of AEK Athens and continuously participates in its events.

== Honours ==
AEK Athens

- Alpha Ethniki: 1962–63
- Greek Cup: 1963–64

Greece military

- World Military Cup: 1962, 1963
