= Panikos Krystallis =

Cypriot footballer (1938–2025)

Personal information
- Full name: Panikos Anastasiou
- Date of birth: 1 July 1938
- Place of birth: Amiantos, British Cyprus
- Date of death: 9 June 2025 (aged 86)
- Place of death: Cyprus
- Position: Forward

Youth career
- 1953–1955: AEL Limassol

Senior career*
Years	Team	Apps	(Gls)
1955–1956	AEL Limassol		
1956–1961	Apollon Limassol		
1961–1963	AEK Athens	32	(3)
1963–1969	Apollon Limassol		
1970–1974	AEL Limassol		

International career
1960–1969	Cyprus	20	(4)

Managerial career
- 1967–1969: Apollon Limassol
- 1972–1976: AEL Limassol
- 1976–1977: Cyprus
- 1977–1981: Evagoras Paphos
- * Club domestic league appearances and goals

Panikos Krystallis (Greek: Πανίκος Κρυστάλλης; 1 July 1938 – 9 June 2025) was a Cypriot football player who played as a forward and a later manager. Apart from a stint abroad with Greek club AEK Athens, he spent his entire career in his home country of Cyprus with Apollon Limassol and AEL Limassol. At international level, he made 20 appearances for the Cyprus national team scoring four goals.

== Early life ==
Krystallis was born in Amiantos and grew up in Limassol. His name was Panikos Anastasiou, but subsequently, in an affidavit, he changed it to Krystallis to honor his mother, Krystalla, who raised him alone, as his father had died very early.

== Club career ==
Krystallis started his football career in 1953, when he joined the academies of AEL Limassol under Argyris Gavalas and in 1955 he was promoted to the men's team. He won two consecutive Cypriot First Division titles in 1954 and 1955. In 1956, after he fell out with the management of the club, he was punished and transferred to the cross-town rivals and second division side, Apollon Limassol, where he had his best years as a striker. With Apollon he started playing after his suspension ended in and contributed to the promotion of the team to the First Division, while in the period 1960–01 he became the top scorer in the Cypriot Championship with 26 goals. In 1961, he was invited by Omonia, alongside Vassos Aristotelous, to strengthen the team in friendly games they played in Bulgaria and the Soviet Union. The return to Cyprus would mark the end of the cooperation with Omonoia, as AEK Athens were interested to include Krystallis in their roster. The advanced, for Cypriot standards at the time, Greek Championship, was a "lifetime dream" of all Cypriot footballers and thus Krystallis, for the huge for the time amount of 5,000 British Pounds, along with his compatriot Dimitris Zagylos of Anorthosis Famagusta, were transferred to AEK in August 1961.

Even though Krystallis found in front of him players such as Kostas Nestoridis and Mimis Papaioannou, he managed to make several appearances with the yellow-blacks. On 2 May 1962, AEK faced Bolton in a friendly match in Nea Filadelfeia. The victory of AEK by 4–1 was largely based on the performance of Krystallis, who was also anointed scorer along with Stamatiadis and Nestoridis who scored twice. The people of Bolton were interested in his acquisition which never took place as the difference of 17,000 pounds that AEK asked for and 12,000 pounds offered by the English was bridged. In 1963, he won with the yellow blacks the championship after a play-off match against Panathinaikos. In the summer of 1963, the president of Apollon Limassol, Emilios Michaelidis, hastily arrived in Athens and almost ordered Krystallis to return to Cyprus and Apollon, who were in decline and a possible relegation to the second was anything but a Government choice in Cyprus. Thus, Krystallis left AEK Athens.

In his second spell in Apollon, he led the club to the conquest of two consecutive Cups in 1966 and 1967, while he won the second cup as a player-coach of the team. He was the player-coach of Apollo from 1967 to 1969. In 1969, he was kicked out of the team after a disagreement with the coach. In 1970, he returned to AEL Limassol at the suggestion of Nikos Solomonidis. In the period 1972–1974, he was a player-coach of AEL, where he finished his career as a footballer.

== International career ==
During his career, he was capped 19 times by the Cyprus national team scoring four goals.

== Managerial career ==
After his playing career was over, Krystallis coached various clubs including AEL Limassol, Apollon Limassol and Evagoras Paphos. On 14 August 1976 he took charge at the bench of Cyprus for a year.

== Personal life and death ==
On 15 July 2021, in a friendly match of AEK Athens and Apollon Limassol at Athens Olympic Stadium, he was jointly honored by both clubs. In later years, he was engaged in painting. He died on 9 June 2025, at the age of 86.

== Honours ==
=== As a player ===
AEL Limassol

- Cypriot First Division: 1954–55, 1955–56

Apollon Limassol

- Cypriot Second Division: 1956–57
- Cypriot Cup: 1965–66

AEK Athens

- Alpha Ethniki: 1962–63

=== As a player-manager ===
Apollon Limassol

- Cypriot Cup: 1966–67

== Sources ==
- Μελετίου, Γιώργος (2011). Κυπριακό ποδόσφαιρο 1900-1960. Λευκωσία: Power Publishing. ISBN 978-9963-688-87-6.
