= Alekos Sofianidis =

Greek footballer and manager (1933–2010)

- Alekos Sofianidis

Personal information
- Full name: Alexandros Sofianidis
- Date of birth: 3 August 1933
- Place of birth: Beyoğlu, Istanbul, Turkey
- Date of death: 6 July 2010 (aged 74)
- Place of death: Athens, Greece
- Height: 1.80 m (5 ft 11 in)
- Positions: Left back; left midfielder

Senior career*
Years	Team	Apps	(Gls)
1955–1958	Beyoğlu	53	(16)
1958–1959	Beşiktaş	3	(0)
1959–1969	AEK Athens	238	(11)
1969–1970	Panachaiki	3	(0)
Total		297	(27)

International career^{‡}
1954	Turkey U19		
1957	Turkey B	1	(0)
1959–1967	Greece	7	(0)
1960	Greece Olympic	1	(0)

Managerial career
- 1970: Panargiakos
- 1970–1971: Atromitos
- 1971–1972: Panelefsiniakos
- 1972: Atromitos
- 1973–1974: AEK Athens (assistant)
- 1974–1975: Ilisiakos
- 1978: Greece (assistant)
- 1988–1989: Greece
- 1999: Atromitos
- * Club domestic league appearances and goals as of 13 January 2018 ‡ National team caps and goals as of 13 January 2018

Alekos Sofianidis (Greek: Αλέκος Σοφιανίδης, Turkish: Aleko Sofyanidis; 3 August 1933 – 6 July 2010) was a Greek professional footballer who played as a left back and a later manager. He represented both Greece and Turkey internationally.

== Club career ==
=== Beyoğluspor ===
Born in the Beyoğlu district of Istanbul Province, Sofianidis began his career at his local Beyoğluspor. Since he was a sports fan, he also played basketball and in was a track and field athlete specializing in throwing events, but he prioritized his football obligations. In 1953, he took first place in the javelin throw in the boys' category at the Istanbul Championship. Fast and dynamic, he competed on the wings of the offense and attracted the interest of the major clubs of Istanbul. During his spell at the club, he played with another Greek footballer, Aleko Yordan.

=== Beşiktaş ===
In 1958 Sofianidis was transferred to Beşiktaş. He competed at both legs of the first round of the 1958–59 European Cup, against Real Madrid. In the first leg at Santiago Bernabéu, the goalkeeper of Beşiktaş Varol Ürkmez was injured at the 84th minute and left the pitch and since there were no substitutions at the time, Sofianidis took his place for approximately 10 minutes, making two crucial saves. In the second leg in Istanbul, Beşiktaş managed a 1–1 draw, with Sofianidis providing the assist for Kaya Köstepen, who scored the club's first-ever goal in European competitions. The events of the September 1955 and the difficult period that followed for the Hellenism of Istanbul, had deeply affected Sofianidis who was thinking of relocating to Greece. During a trip to Athens in 1958, he met the president of AEK Athens, Nikos Goumas, who invited him to join the club. He then began a correspondence with the official of the Greek club, Giorgos Tranopoulos with the exclusive subject of concern, his move to AEK.

=== AEK Athens ===
On 17 January 1959, AEK eventually submitted the sport's card of Sofianidis to the HFF and at the same time started negotiating with the TFF for the release of the player, so he can compete with the club. Sofianidis played only in friendly matches until the agreement with the Turks was reached and his move became official in the summer of 1959, which coincided with the start of the first championship with a national division in Greece. The arrival of Jenő Csaknády at the bench of AEK in 1962 also brought about a change of position for Sofianidis, since the Hungarian-German manager relocated him to the position of left wing-back, where Sofianidis spent the rest of his career standing out as one of the best footballers to play that position. In 1968, when AEK played against Fenerbahçe in the Balkans Cup final in 1968, Sofianidis did not accompany his club to Istanbul as he would have been liable for arrest by the Turkish authorities for not fulfill his military obligations. With AEK he won 2 Championships, as well as the 2 Greek Cups, while he was a key member of the squad that reached the quarter-finals of the European Cup in 1969.

=== Panachaiki ===
In the summer of 1969 he was released from AEK and joined Panachaiki where he played for a season, before his retirement.

== International career ==
Sofianidis competed with Turkey U19 in 1954, while on 20 May 1957 he also represented the Turkey B, in a friendly 1–0 win over Egypt.

Sofianidis was capped by Greece seven times. He played his first national game on 15 November 1959 against Yugoslavia. His last game for Greece was against Finland on 10 May 1967.

== Managerial career ==
On 6 May 1970, before gaining his coaching diploma, Sofianidis took charge of Panargiakos for the final five matches of the season. Afterwards, he attended a coaching school at Leicester. On 9 August, he was appointed manager of Atromitos for a season. On 5 August 1972 he returned to Atromitos for a very brief spell. In the following season, he served as an assistant manager to Stan Anderson at AEK Athens, until 18 April 1974, when the Englishman was fired.

In 1988 Sofianidis was appointed manager of Greece. His first game was on 15 November 1988 against Hungary, where Greece won 3–0. Greece played seven matches under Sofianidis, winning three, drawing one and losing three. He was also in charge during the infamous friendly against Turkey on 29 March 1989, losing 1–0. It was also his final match as national team manager.

== Personal life ==
Sofianidis was a gymnastics teacher by profession. He had a pool's agency in Athens on Agios Meletios Street. He died on 6 July 2010 after a long battle with cancer at the age of 74.

== Career statistics ==
=== International ===
Appearances and goals by national team and year
National team	Year	Apps	Goals
Greece	1959	1	0
Greece	1960	0	0
Greece	1961	0	0
Greece	1962	1	0
Greece	1963	1	0
Greece	1964	0	0
Greece	1965	1	0
Greece	1966	0	0
Greece	1967	3	0
Total		7	0

== Honours ==
AEK Athens

- Alpha Ethniki: 1962–63, 1967–68
- Greek Cup: 1963–64, 1965–66
