= Sofos Koulidis =

Greek footballer and manager (1939–2018)

Personal information
- Full name: Sofoklis Koulidis
- Date of birth: 1939
- Place of birth: Aigaleo, Athens, Greece
- Date of death: 8 June 2018 (aged 78–79)
- Place of death: Athens, Greece
- Position: Midfielder

Youth career
- –1958: Egaleo

Senior career*
| Years | Team | Apps | (Gls) |
| 1958–1962 | Egaleo | 66 | (3) |
| 1962–1964 | AEK Athens | 2 | (0) |
| 1964–1966 | Panegialios | 15 | (0) |
| 1966–1967 | Panarkadikos | | |

Managerial career
- 1972–1973: Aris Agios Konstantinos
- 1973–1975: Orfeas Egaleo
- Ethnikos Asteras
- Aias Salamina
- * Club domestic league appearances and goals

Sofoklis "Sofos" Koulidis (Greek: Σοφοκλής "Σόφος" Κουλίδης; 1939 – 8 June 2018) was a Greek professional footballer who played as a midfielder and later a manager.

== Club career ==
Koulidis his football career at the infrastructure departments of his local club, Egaleo. In 1958, he made his debut with the senior team in the first division of the AFCA league. In his first season at the club he made 13 league appearances, scoring once. In 1959, Koulidis expressed his desire for a move to AEK Athens, the club he supported as a child. However, the officials of Egaleo weren't keen in him transferring to another the club. The following summer, he signed a sport's card with AEK in secret, but the club did not make use of it, fearing for the player's punhsiment. During his spell at the club he won two consecutive local championships and playing in the newly established second national division, helping his team to win promotion to the first national division in 1961. Eventually, on 31 July 1962, the officials of AEK combined the transfer of his teammate, Manolis Kanellopoulos with his signing and the move which he desired took place.

In his first season at the club he made two appearances, where AEK won a championship. In the following season, he did not make any appearances, playing mainly with the reserve team. AEK won the Cup at the end of the season.

On 28 July 1964, Koulidis moved to Panegialios, where he played for two seasons. Afterwards, he signed for Panarkadikos, where he played for one season in the second division before ending his career in 1967.

== Managerial career ==
After the end of his playing career, Koulidis was involved in coaching, taking charge of various clubs from the second and third division. In 1972, he became the manager of Aris Agios Konstantinos for a season, playing in the Phthiotis FCA league. Afterwards, he was appointed at Orfeas Egaleo, for two seasons, winning promotion to the second national division for the first time in club's history. His spell at the club was overshadowed by an incident that occurred at Stavros Mavrothalassitis Stadium on 5 June 1975, in a match against Daphne Erythron. The match was decisive for Orfeas, who wanted only victory in order to secure promotion to the second national division. Koulidis had constant arguments and counter-arguments with the team's curator, Efthymis Stivaktopoulos. After a heated argument, Stivaktopoulos headbutted Koulidis in the neck with the latter retaliating with a blow that left the curator unconscious. Stivaktopoulos was transferred to the General State Hospital of Nikaia, where he died three days later. Koulidis, who had meanwhile fled to Agios Konstantinos at Phthiotis, was arrested by Gendarmerie officers, transferred to Athens, referred by order of the Athens Criminal Courts for fatal bodily harm and imprisoned. Afterwards, he took charge of Ethnikos Asteras for almost the entire decade of the 1980s until the mid-1990's, winning the fourth national division championship in 1992. He also worked at the bench of Aias Salamina.

== Death ==
Koulidis died on 8 June 2018.

== Honours ==
=== Player ===
Egaleo

- AFCA league: 1959–60, 1960–61

AEK Athens

- Alpha Ethniki: 1962–63
- Greek Cup: 1963–64

=== Manager ===
Ethnikos Asteras

- Delta Ethniki: 1991–92 (3rd group)
