= Original 21 =

Football hooligans club

- Type: Supporters, Ultras group
- Abbreviation: R21
- Territory: Athens, Greece
- Years active: 1982–present
- Club: A.E.K.
- Motto: AEK against all
- Website: https://www.facebook.com/ORIGINAL21official
- YouTube: https://www.youtube.com/@Original-py1yx

Original 21 (Greek: Ορίτζιναλ 21) is the name of the association which consists of many supporters groups of the Greek multi-sports club A.E.K. Officially founded in 1982, Original 21 is the biggest supporters' union of A.E.K. with members from all over Greece. Over the years, the group has become a part of the club by affecting club decisions and by following the club on all possible occasions.

== Background ==
After the fall of the dictatorship, Greek society was dominated by the demand for the active participation of citizens in all political and social sectors. In this context, fan associations were also created.

One of them was the first organized association of A.E.K. fans with the name Gate 21, founded in 1975. The name came from the corresponding entrance of the Nikos Goumas Stadium where the most passionate supporters of the team gathered. In a way similar to a political party, which is organized with the axes of reference of the offices of local organizations, Gate 21 started its operation by renting an underground space in the area of Agios Nikolaos, Attica. The area was just four train stops from the Nikos Goumas Stadium. The meetings of its members took place there. However, internal conflicts over the organization's action and orientation soon became apparent. Thus, in 1982 Gate 21 was split. The members who supported a more active presence in the life of the group left and founded the Genuine Gate 21, the Original 21, led by Dimitris Hatzichristos, who gradually developed into a leading figure and a key exponent of the association. Hatzichristos died on June 5, 2025, after losing a long battle with a persistent health issue.

Original 21 was the first fan organization that, in 1982, raised the skull and crossbones as their flag, a symbol that can still be seen in almost all stadiums in Greece today. It symbolized the "fighting death" of their opponents and the "pirate" character of its members.

== History ==
=== Origins ===
Original 21 was created in 1975, as Gate 21, taking its name from Gate 21 of the Nikos Goumas Stadium, in Nea Filadelfeia, from where its hardcore fans watched the team's games. From 1982, when a second stand molding was constructed on the opposite door doors of Gate 21 (9–11) and after it was split from Gate 21, the "seat" of the Original 21 was moved to those doors, henceforth known as "Skepasti". The name of Original 21 comes from the translation of "Genuine Gate 21".

After the demolition of the historic stadium of AEK in 2003, and the use of the Olympic Stadium of Athens, the association has made its "headquarters" one of the two curva's, that at Gates 1–35, just opposite the other curva of the stadium, at gate 21. Original 21 has a total of 60 sub-links/clubs in various parts of the world, in Greece, Cyprus, London and two important Greek communities in Australia, Sydney and Melbourne. The "central" club and headquarters of the organization is the so-called "Domatiaki" in the Square of the Argentine Republic.

=== Today ===
In 2008, when AEK was in the beginning of their financial struggle, Original 21 officially entered the club's administration, taking over the management of AEK Athletic Club after elections. Their primary goal was to enroll 10,000 members.

A historic moment in the course of the organization was the departure of its natural leader, Dimitris Hatzichristos, who left its ranks with the relegation of AEK FC in 2013. Since then, Original 21 has not had a person who can be described as the leader of the organization.

In 2022, Original 21 returned, together with AEK, back to Nea Filadelfeia, at the newly built Agia Sophia Stadium. They now stand at Gate 21 of the stadium and continue to have a huge impact to the club.

== Friendships ==
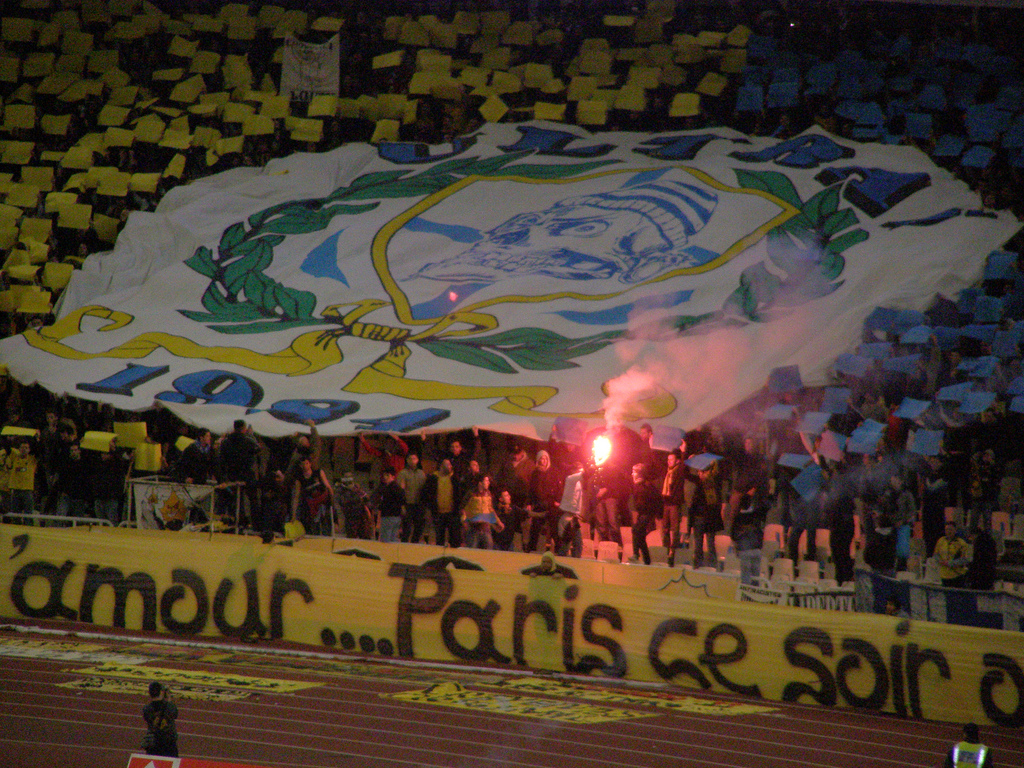
AEK fans lifting a Commando Ultras 1984 banner

A so-called "triangle of brotherhood" has developed between the largest left-wing fan clubs of AEK, Marseille and Livorno. The connection is mostly an ideological one. Also, AEK's, FC Partizan Minsk's.

== Politics ==
Original 21 is widely known for their political stance and their left-wing and antifascist ideology.

Football and politics become homogenous in one way or another. AEK Athens is a club that has deep roots in the community around it. Therefore, the viewpoints of the community are generally reflected at the club.

AEK was created by Greek refugees. For this reason, they represent the wider part of the general Greek society who feel they are left out and segregated. They offer a refuge for all fans.

Original 21 has stood by the side of various people, such as the people of Palestine, Kurdistan, Albania, and others.

AEK fans almost always display banners of solidarity towards the people of Palestine but has also stood against Israel and Israeli clubs. Specifically, several instances have attracted more people and have made a larger impact. The world of AEK demonstrates a particular sensitivity towards the people of Palestine. The Palestinian flag is almost always raised in the stands, often accompanied by banners either criticizing American and Israeli officials or showing solidarity with Palestinian fighters and activists. AEK, born amidst war, persecution, and displacement, cannot help but stand in solidarity with the forgotten ones of this land. In 2018 and in 2023, in BCL games against Hapoel Jerusalem, AEK fans raised banners against Israel but also burned several Israeli flags and violently attacked Hapoel's supporters.

Again in 2018, in the Champions League game against Ajax, AEK fans displayed Palestine and Hezbollah flags along with violent hooligan clashes against Ajax ultras, including a petrol bomb, and a controversial banner against UEFA and FIFA that said: “A LA CARTE FFP APPLICATION – PANAMA PAPERS SCANDAL – TAX EVASION – BRIBERIES – MONEY LAUNDERING – OFFSHORE FRAUD DEALS – BACKHANDERS FROM TV SPONSORSHIPS": THESE ARE THE REAL CRIMES AGAINST FOOTBALL! NOT PYROTECHNICS! UEFA – FIFA: KINGS OF CORRUPTION!". After that game, AEK was punished by the Disciplinary Committee of the European Federation with a two-match stadium ban, a one-year exclusion from participating in European competitions, but with a two-year suspension, and a fine of 80,000 euros.

In 2001, AEK was playing against the Scottish team Hibernian. Following UEFA's directive, a minute of silence was held before all European matches to honor the victims of the September 11 attacks. However, the AEK fans refused to remain silent and participate in what they perceived as institutional hypocrisy. Their refusal was not out of disrespect for the dead, but rather because they found it highly hypocritical to observe a minute of silence only for the victims of the Twin Towers and not for the thousands of dead in Afghanistan and elsewhere. The stadium continued to chant and send an anti-war message. One of the most notable slogans was "Murderers of the People, Americans," which was shouted by almost everyone in the Nikos Goumas Stadium.

In 2019, in the game against Volos, Original 21 raised a banner about the October 2019 Turkish offensive into north-eastern Syria and solidarity towards the people of Kurdistan. The banner said: "Kemal has been reborn, Hitler revived, and you all lie in silence by the children's corpses." They also raised banners supporting Palestine and a Hezbollah flag.

=== Anti-fascism ===
Original 21 also made a clear stance against fascism during the game against Dynamo Kyiv in the Europa League in 2018. Well before the match, the anti-fascist movement was on alert, with the anarchist collective Rouvikonas warning of Dynamo fans and members of the Right Sector. In their statement, they state: "Under normal circumstances, there is nothing more indifferent to an anarchist collective than a football match. However, these are not normal circumstances. Along with the Dynamo Kyiv players, a significant number of organized fans will also arrive, as is usually the case in such situations. The presence of organized Dynamo Kyiv fans is a challenge to the entire anti-fascist world, whether it is related to football or not."

The tension ultimately did not manifest against the local anti-fascists but rather against a group of Russians in Kolonaki, Athens, resulting in unprecedented incidents for the area. However, AEK fans did not stand idly by, and even before the game, they posted an anti-Nazi message on Facebook that concluded: "Today, all together - one kick - we score against the neo-Nazis!" At the Olympic Stadium (OAKA), the Anti-Fascist stance continued with the display of banners that read "LOVE AEK, HATE RACISM. ORIGINAL 21 ANTI-NAZI" and "THROW NAZIS OUT OF FOOTBALL." The first banner was accompanied by the Anti-Fascist symbol with the crossed-out swastika. Additionally, another banner raised at OAKA stated in Ukrainian: "In 1942, the Nazis hanged your football players, in 2018 you disrespect your history," referring to the Death Match during World War II.

=== Fight against Golden Dawn ===
The battle between Original 21 and Golden Dawn started in 2012, when Golden Dawn made its first entry into the Greek Parliament and opened offices in various regions. There was a rumor that the organization wanted to try to open offices next a fan club of Original 21 in Peristeri, Athens. At the time, AEK fans had taken to the street with a banner reading "Don't even think about it", openly declaring their intentions.

At the end of the same year, specifically in December 2012, the then member of Parliament for Syriza, Dimitris Stratoulis, denounced a fascist attack against him while he was at the stadium watching his team play in the football match between AEK Athens and Atromitos at the Athens Olympic Stadium. The men who attacked him not only resorted to verbal assault but also physically assaulted him, leading to his transfer to the stadium's clinic for first aid. Syriza, in a statement at the time, identified the perpetrators as members of Golden Dawn, stating: "We denounce the brutal attack against SYRIZA MP Dimitris Stratoulis by members of Golden Dawn. The SYRIZA MP suffered fatal blows to the head outside the Olympic Stadium during halftime, from three individuals who, upon recognizing him, declared themselves as members of Golden Dawn, telling him, 'Now we will kill you.' We demand the immediate arrest and prosecution of the perpetrators. Tolerance towards the fascist organization Golden Dawn inevitably leads to mourning lives and undermines democracy. The response must be immediate and decisive before it's too late." Original 21, in turn, had stated at the time that "we should put an end once and for all to this cancer of fascists," also noting: "We, as Original 21, as descendants of refugees/migrants, and ultimately as ordinary people, want to make it clear to the cowardly worms who attacked Stratoulis, an AEK fan, that they are unwanted and now wanted by the authorities. The large family of AEK includes people without color and borders. Misanthropes have no place among us."

A few days later, in January 2013, Original 21 fans were attacked by members of Golden Dawn in Corinth while they were collecting food and clothing for needy, immigrants, and detainees. "On Thursday afternoon, while five individuals were depositing the food they had previously purchased, five fascists disembarked from two cars and attacked them, wielding folding knives. What followed is food for thought. P.S. Perhaps some people need to start taking arithmetic lessons. Not a single step back," stated a concise announcement by the fan club of Original 21 in Corinth.

On the day of Pavlos Fyssas' death, the announcement by Original 21 has since demonstrated the prevailing presence of anti-fascists in the stands of the club. AEK was among the teams that took a stance following the murder of Pavlos Fyssas' by Golden Dawn and raised a banner that read: "Fascists kill, cops collaborate, and the 300 play with our lives."

Apart from banners and statements, Original 21 had launched an attack on the offices of Golden Dawn in Trikala in January 2016, prior to their basketball team's game against the local team. According to reports, over 500 AEK fans chanted anti-fascist slogans and threw stones, bricks, and flares at the offices after conducting a march in the city.

== See also ==
- A.E.K.
- A.E.K. F.C.
- A.E.K. B.C.
