= Ibrahim Mughrabi =

Palestinian footballer (born 1939)

Personal information
- Full name: Ibrahim Mughrabi
- Date of birth: 1939 (age 86–87)
- Place of birth: Aleppo, Syria
- Position: Striker

Senior career*
Years	Team	Apps	(Gls)
–1962	Halab Al-Ahli		
1962–1963	AEK Athens	22	(7)
1963–1964	Al Ahli		

International career
- Syria Military
1965	Palestine	6	(1)
- * Club domestic league appearances and goals

Ibrahim Mughrabi (Arabic: إبراهيم المغربي, born 1939) is a Palestinian former footballer who played professionally in Syria, Greece, and Egypt as a striker. He was the first foreigner to ever play in the Greek Championship. In Greece he was known mononymously as Ibrahim.

== Club career ==
Mughrabi studied Law at the Damascus University, while playing football for Halab Al-Ahli. Hailing from a noble family, he played football mostly as a hobby.

In 1962 he moved to Athens in order to continue his studies at the University of Athens and signed for AEK Athens, becoming the first ever foreign player to play for a Greek club. He made his debut, on 27 September 1962 against Egaleo, introducing himself to the fans of the club by scoring a hat-trick, in a 7–2 win. On 7 October, he opened the score with a header in the 4–0 home win against Ethnikos Piraeus He also scored an opener against Aris on 21 October, in the final 3–1 win at home. On 28 April 1963, he scored in the 3–0 home win over Panionios. He shaped the last of the 5 goals of his club in the 5–1 against PAOK at home, on 5 May. His last 2 goals for AEK were on 19 May 1963 in a match for the Greek Cup at home against Kalamata, where he formed the final 7–1. In his only season at AEK he won the Greek Championship.

He left AEK and Greece halfway of the season and returned to Syria, while the following year he moved to Cairo and joined Al Ahli, where he signed a professional contract. It is the first professional contract signed in Egyptian football. At the end of the season he gave up football to practice law.

== International career ==
In 1965, he played with Palestine in the 4th Pan-Arab Games held in Egypt, winning the fourth place. He scored the winner in the match against Lebanon.

== Personal life ==
Mughrabi lived for decades in Switzerland, along with his partner.

== Honours ==
AEK Athens

- Alpha Ethniki: 1962–63
