= Pavlos Grigoriadis =

Greek footballer and manager (1938–2007)

Personal information
- Date of birth: 27 May 1938
- Place of birth: Sitagroi, Greece
- Date of death: 24 November 2007 (aged 69)
- Position: Forward

Senior career*
Years	Team	Apps	(Gls)
1959–1961	Doxa Drama		
1961–1965	Olympiacos		

International career
1960	Greece	1	(0)

Managerial career
- 1972–1973: Pierikos
- 1973: Lamia
- 1975–1976: Kastoria
- 1979: Korinthos
- 1983–1984: Panserraikos
- 1987: Olympiacos (caretaker)
- 1988: Olympiacos (caretaker)
- 1989: Ionikos
- * Club domestic league appearances and goals

Pavlos Grigoriadis (Greek: Παύλος Γρηγοριάδης; 27 May 1938 – 24 November 2007) was a Greek]] football player and manager who played as a forward.
