= Dimitris Zagylos =

Cypriot footballer and coach (1938–2022)

- Dimitris Zagylos

Personal information
- Full name: Dimitrios Zagylos
- Date of birth: 15 March 1938
- Place of birth: Paralimni, Cyprus
- Date of death: 10 June 2022 (aged 84)
- Place of death: Cyprus
- Position: Right winger

Youth career
- 1953–1956: Anorthosis Famagusta

Senior career*
Years	Team	Apps	(Gls)
1956–1961	Anorthosis Famagusta		
1961–1963	AEK Athens	19	(5)
1963–1968	Anorthosis Famagusta		

International career
- Cyprus

Managerial career
- Enosis Neon Paralimni
- * Club domestic league appearances and goals

Dimitris Zagylos (Greek: Δημήτρης Ζάγκυλος; 15 March 1938 – 10 June 2022) was a Cypriot professional footballer who played as a right winger and a later manager. His nickname was "Dimitrakis" (Greek: Δημητράκης)

== Club career ==
Zagylos started football at Anorthosis Famagusta, from 1953. In 1958, he emerged as the top scorer of the league with 21 goals. With Anorthosis he won 3 championships, and a Cypriot Cup in 1959.

In the summer of 1961, he transferred to AEK Athens, who paid the sum of 320,000 drachmas for his acquisition. Zagylos showed aspects of his talent in Greece as well, standing out for his inexhaustible combativeness, his elaborate game and his excellent attacks, however, due to injuries, he did not perform as well as he could. In April 1962 he secretly left for Cyprus, because AEK had not found him a job as promised. In fact, he had worked for two weeks in the shop of an agent of AEK, but was fired without knowing the reason. After almost a month he came back after the people of AEK assured him that they would find him a job with a satisfactory salary. With AEK he won the Greek championship in 1963.

He played in AEK until October 1963 and then returned to Anorthosis, winning another Cup in 1964, scoring in the final against APOEL. He played at the club of Famagusta until 1968, when he finished his football career. He is the fourth scorer in the history of Anorthosis with 93 goals in 166 appearances.

== International career ==
Zagylos was an international footballer with Cyprus.

== Managerial career ==
After the end of his football career, Zagylos also worked as a coach at Enosis Neon Paralimni, winning the Cypriot Second Division and the promotion to the First Cypriot Division in 1969.

== Personal life ==
Zagylos died on the morning of 10 June 2022, at the age of 84.

== Honours ==
=== As a player ===
Anorthosis Famagusta

- Cypriot First Division: 1956–57, 1957–58, 1959–60
- Cypriot Cup: 1958–59, 1963–64

AEK Athens

- Alpha Ethniki: 1962–63

Individual

- Cypriot First Division top scorer: 1957–58

=== As a manager ===
Enosis Neon Paralimni

- Cypriot Second Division: 1968–69
