= Kostas Linoxilakis =

Greek footballer

Personal information
- Full name: Konstantinos Linoxilakis
- Date of birth: 5 March 1933
- Place of birth: Ano Meros, Rethymnon, Athens, Greece
- Date of death: 30 December 2014 (aged 81)
- Place of death: Athens, Greece
- Position: Defender

Senior career*
Years	Team	Apps	(Gls)
1950–1951	Asteras Athinon		
1951–1963	Panathinaikos	101	(7)

International career
1950–1960	Greece	28	(1)

Managerial career
- 1973–1975: Atromitos
- 1975–1976: Apollon Athens
- * Club domestic league appearances and goals

Kostas Linoxilakis (Greek: Κώστας Λινοξυλάκης; 5 March 1933 – 3 December 2014) was a Greek former international and Olympic footballer.

== Career ==
Linoxilakis started his career at Asteras Athens and was centre back of Panathinaikos from 1950 when he was only 17 years old until the 1962–1963 season. As player of Panthinaikos, he won 4 greek championships (1953, 1960, 1961, 1962) and one Greek Cup title (1955).

He was capped a total of 28 times by the Greece national team during his career, scoring 1 goal. He was member of the national side for the 1952 Olympic Games.

After retiring, Linoxilakis began his career as a manager and coached Atromitos, Fostiras, Proodeftiki, Apollon Athens and Chalkida.

He was elected at least four times to the Athens City Council.
