= Nikos Goumas =

Greek businessman

- Nikos Goumas

12th president of AEK Athens
- In office 13 February 1957 – 23 November 1963
- Preceded by: Georgios Chrisafidis
- Succeeded by: Alexandros Makridis

Personal details
- Born: 1908 Spetses, Greece
- Died: 17 August 2001 (aged 92–93) Athens, Greece
- Spouse: Ekaterini Polemis
- Occupation: Entrepreneur; Shipowner
- Known for: President of AEK Athens F.C.

Nikos Goumas (Greek: Νίκος Γκούμας; 1908 – 17 August 2001) was a Greek businessman who served as the twelfth president of AEK Athens F.C. from 1957 until 1963. He was considered one of the "patriarchs" of the club.

== Early life ==
Goumas was born Andros. Ηe was involved mainly with the ship owning business.

== President of AEK Athens ==
From a young age Goumas was involved in the administration of AEK Athens, before WWII and remained involved in the club's administration into his later years. In the 1950s, he envisioned the modernization and expansion of AEK's stadium in Nea Filadelfeia. On 19 November 1956 an objection was filed challenging the validity of the club's election which had taken place the previous day. On 12 February 1957 the objection was upheld and the election was annulled, while the Board of Members of the club was dismissed. The following day Goumas was elected president of a temporary administration. The first months of his tenure were satisfactory to both the supporters and the officials of the club, so when the elections were held on 13 October he was re-elected, this time as a permanent president.

During his spell Goumas expanded and modernized the stadium with the addition of two small stands and changing-room facilities, transforming it into one of the most modern stadiums of its time. With the completion of the works in late 1961, the stadium could accommodate more than 40,000 spectators. On 3 January 1962, the inauguration took place with great splendor in the friendly against Barcelona. The match was attended by the heir to the Spanish throne, Juan Carlos and his future wife, Sofia. Goumas also signed players such as Mimis Papaioannou, Alekos Sofianidis and Stelios Skevofilakas, while under his presidency AEK won and their first post-war league title in 1963. In July 1963 he took the decision to step down from the presidency of the club after six years. After months of proceedings in order to elect a new administration of the club, he was eventually replaced on 24 November by Alexandros Makridis.

The final contribution of Goumas to AEK was the construction of the roof over Gate 18 of the stadium on 7 September 1991. From that day onward, the historic AEK Stadium bore his name, until its demolition in 2003.

== Death ==
Goumas suffered with a lung infection and after a 27-day hospitalization at "Hygeia" with a lung infection, he died on 17 August 2001 at 11:30 in the morning at the age of 93. He was buried in his place of origin, Andros.
