= Nikos Goumas Stadium =

Stadium in Athens, Greece (1930–2003)

- Interactive map of Nikos Goumas Stadium
- Former names: AEK Stadium
- Location: Nea Filadelfeia, Athens, Greece
- Coordinates: 38°2′13.01″N 23°44′28.89″E
- Owner: AEK
- Operator: AEK Athens F.C.
- Capacity: 24,729
- Surface: Grass
- Scoreboard: Yes
- Field size: 105 x 68 m

Construction
- Groundbreaking: 1928
- Built: 1928–1930
- Opened: 2 November 1930; 96 years ago
- Renovated: 1998
- Expanded: 1955–1962, 1979
- Closed: 3 May 2003; 23 years ago
- Demolished: 5 May 2003 – June 2003

Tenants
- AEK Athens (1930–1985, 1987–2003); Nea Ionia football clubs (1932–?); Greece (selected matches)

Nikos Goumas Stadium (Greek: Στάδιο Νίκος Γκούμας) was a multi-purpose stadium in Nea Filadelfeia, a northwestern suburb of the Athens urban area, Greece. It was used mostly for football matches and was the home stadium of AEK Athens. It has since been replaced by Agia Sophia Stadium, that was built on the same location.

== Name ==
The stadium was originally named "AEK Stadium" (Greek: Γήπεδο ΑΕΚ), but was also known as "Nea Filadelfeia Stadium" (Greek: Στάδιο Νέας Φιλαδέλφειας).

On 7 September 1991, it was officially named "Nikos Goumas Stadium" after the former club president, Nikos Goumas, who contributed to its building and later upgrading.

== History ==
=== Construction ===
In 1926, through the actions of the first president of AEK Athens, Konstantinos Spanoudis, a piece of land in the suburb of Nea Filadelfeia, originally set aside for refugee housing, was donated as a training ground for refugees. AEK began using the grounds for training (albeit unofficially), and by 1930, the property was signed over to the club.

The stadium was completed in 1929 and officially opened in 1930 at a ceremony attended by Prime Minister Eleftherios Venizelos. The first home game, on 2 November 1930, was an exhibition match against Olympiacos, which ended in a 2–2 draw. The stadium had a horseshoe shape (with stands on three of its four sides).

=== Expansion ===
On 11 March 1955, the first expansion of the stadium began under the presidency of Nikos Goumas. The expansion included the construction of a large new stand and the installation of turf. The construction works on the stadium lasted about 7 years. The inauguration of the new stand took place on 3 January 1962 with a friendly match against Barcelona. The game, which ended 0–6 for the Catalans, was attended by the heir to the Spanish throne, Juan Carlos, and his future wife, Sofia.

In 1979, the chairman of the club, Loukas Barlos, initiated the constitution of a double-tiered south stand, the addition of which made it the largest stadium in Athens at the time, as its capacity was over 35,000 after the construction of this new stand. This stand, and particularly its lower tier known as "Skepasti" ("the Covered"), became the new home of the ultras of AEK, who had until then resided in the opposite "Gate 21" stand. The stand was inaugurated on October 7 in a league match against Panathinaikos, which ended 0–1 for the greens.

On 30 November 1980, the stadium set an attendance record when AEK sold 36,766 tickets in the league game against Panathinaikos.

From the summer of 1985 to the summer of 1987, the stadium was closed due to construction works for the renewal of its pitch. During that period, AEK moved to the Olympic Stadium.

=== Renovation ===
In 1998, AEK Athens decided to install new seats, reducing the stadium's capacity from 35,000 to 24,729 (excluding the press and VIP stands).

=== Demolition ===
Giannis Granitsas, then president of the amateur AEK and temporarily chairman of AEK Athens F.C., decided to demolish the stadium in June 2003. He claimed that the stadium was too old and seriously damaged by the 1999 Athens earthquake. The last match held at the stadium was on 3 May 2003 between AEK Athens and Aris. The game ended in a 4–0 win for AEK with Ilija Ivić scoring the last goal at the 77th minute.

== Plans for a new venue ==
The club's initial plan was to build a modern arena on the same site, including an underground parking and an innovative underground basketball court. These ambitious plans were halted after various objections raised by local residents.

After AEK Athens F.C. came under new ownership under Demis Nikolaidis's direction, the plan for a stadium in Nea Filadelfeia was abandoned. Nikolaidis started negotiations to build a new football stadium farther north, on the southern foothills of Mount Parnitha. However, this drew considerable controversy among the team's fan club, Original 21, who opposed the plan. Nevertheless, the land of the former Nikos Goumas stadium remained under the ownership of AEK, and plans for building a new stadium in the Nikos Goumas area were kept alive.

On October 2, 2013, the AEK Athens board under Dimitris Melissanidis presented plans for a new stadium to the municipality of Nea Filadelfeia in order to gain building permission. A new 4-star UEFA-rated system stadium was about to be built, seating between 32.500 and 35.000 spectators. The project's cost was initially not published, but AEK had been granted 20 million euros by the Greek government as a contribution to the construction, with the rest of the funding to be provided privately.

The new stadium is modeled after Hagia Sophia church in Constantinople, since AEK has its roots in the city. The project generated around 1.000–1.500 new jobs, and the neighborhood was expected to largely benefit from this endeavor. Construction of the new Agia Sophia Stadium at the site was completed in October 2022.

== International matches ==
18 October 1962 Friendly	Greece	3–2	Ethiopia
	Papaemmanouil 13'; Nestoridis 15'; G. Deimezis 53'		Vassalo 50'; Worku 78'	Attendance: 10,123; Referee: Alexandros Monastiriotis (Greece)

21 November 1968 Friendly	Greece	4–1	Egypt
	Papaioannou 29'; Aidiniou 31'; Dedes 53' 65'		M. Reyad 58'	Attendance: 10,010; Referee: Vangelis Pazaropoulos (Greece)

31 January 1973 Friendly	Greece	2–2	Bulgaria
	Sarafis 13'; Eleftherakis 17'		Petkov 31'; Bonev 37'	Attendance: 22,000; Referee: Fulvio Pieroni (Italy)

15 February 1978 Friendly	Greece	1–1	Austria
	Galakos 40'		Krankl 59'	Attendance: 11,297; Referee: Domenico Serafino (Italy)

20 January 1982 Friendly	Greece	1–2	Portugal
	Anastopoulos 24'		Oliveira 42' 77'	Attendance: 8,753; Referee: Günter Linn (West Germany)

10 March 1982 Friendly	Greece	0–2	Soviet Union
			Cherenkov 39'; Buryak 50'	Attendance: 12,000; Referee: Jean-Marie Macheret (Switzerland)

17 April 1991 Friendly	Greece	2–2	Sweden
19:00 (UTC+3:00)	Vonderburg 11' (o.g.); Borbokis 83'	Report	Erlingmark 21'; Mild 63'	Attendance: 3,900; Referee: Pierluigi Magni (Italy)

19 February 1997 Friendly	Greece	0–0	Portugal
		Report		Attendance: 10,000; Referee: Aron Husu (Romania)

10 November 2001 Friendly	Greece	4–2	Estonia
	Nikolaidis 6', 9'; Tsiartas 24'; Machlas 39'	Report	Viikmäe 44'; Zelinski 81' (pen.)	Attendance: 1,200; Referee: Roy Helge Olsen (Norway)

== Record ==
Team	Competition	Pld	W	D	L
AEK Athens	League	715	570	93	52
AEK Athens	Cup	165	137	17	11
AEK Athens	EPSA	162	105	29	28
AEK Athens	Balkans Cup	12	8	2	2
AEK Athens	UEFA	64	36	17	11
AEK Athens	Total	1,118	856	158	104

Team	Competition	Pld	W	D	L	GF	GA	GD
Greece	International friendlies	9	3	4	2	17	14	+3

== Concerts ==
Rory Gallagher performed at the stadium in 1981. In 1988, David Hasselhoff entered and performed on the ground of the stadium along with KITT. Iron Maiden and Bryan Adams also had a performance at the stadium in 1988, and the group The Cure in 1989. In 1990, Tina Turner gave a concert in the stadium. In 1992, the group Simply Red and in 1993 Elton John and Sting performed at Nikos Goumas Stadium.
