= 1963–64 Greek Football Cup =

1963–64 Greek Cup
Tournament details
- Country: Greece

Final positions
- Champions: AEK Athens (12th title)
- Runners-up: None

The 1963–64 Greek Football Cup was the 22nd edition of the Greek Football Cup.

The final was scratched and AEK Athens were awarded the cup after Panathinaikos and Olympiacos were ejected from the competition following the abandonment of their semi-final in the 115th minute with the score 1–1 due to riots by supporters from both teams, who believed the match had been fixed to end in a draw in order to have a replay for financial reasons (this was the same reason that the final of 1961–62 was abandoned and the cup withheld). Initially the winner of the semi-final was decided by a draw which Olympiacos won and were to play against AEK on 26 August 1964 at Leoforos Alexandras Stadium. Eventually Olympiacos decided not to show up for the match not wanting to line up without their footballers that were serving in the army.

== Calendar ==
From Round of 32 onwards:

Round	Date(s)	Fixtures	Clubs	New entries
Round of 32	26 April 1964	17	32 → 16	16
Round of 16	24 May 1964	9	16 → 8	none
Quarter-finals	3 June 1964	4	8 → 4	none
Semi-finals	17 June 1964	2	4 → 1	none

== Knockout phase ==
In the knockout phase, teams play against each other over a single match. If the match ends up as a draw, extra time will be played and if the match remains a draw a replay match is set at the home of the guest team which the extra time rule stands as well. If a winner doesn't occur after the replay match the winner emerges by a flip of a coin.
The mechanism of the draws for each round is as follows:

- In the draw for the round of 32, the teams that had qualified to previous' season Round of 16 are seeded and the clubs that passed the qualification round are unseeded.
- In the draws for the round of 16 onwards, there are no seedings, and teams from the same group can be drawn against each other.

== Bracket ==
Round of 32
Fostiras	0
Pierikos	2
Niki Volos	6
Achilleas Triandria	2
Pagchaniakos	0
Ethnikos Piraeus	1
Apollon Athens	3
Pallamiaki Enosi	0
AEK Kalamata	1
Panionios	5
Panegialios	0
Proodeftiki	1
Edessaikos	1
PAOK	4
Anagennisi Arta	0
AEK Athens	7
Aris	1
Aris Ptolemaida	0
Panathinaikos	4
Elpida Drama	1
Olympiacos Kozani	2	2
Apollon Kalamarias	2	1
Vyzas Megara	3
Chalandri	0
Olympiacos	10
Rodiakos	2
Averoff Ioannina	0
Iraklis	2
Chalkida	0
Atromitos	2
Egaleo	2
Attikos	1

Round of 16
Pierikos	1
Niki Volos	0
Ethnikos Piraeus	0
Apollon Athens	1
Panionios	1
Proodeftiki (a.e.t.)	2
PAOK	0
AEK Athens (a.e.t.)	3
Aris	0
Panathinaikos (a.e.t.)	2
Olympiacos Kozani	2	1
Vyzas Megara	2	4
Olympiacos	2
Iraklis	0
Atromitos	2
Egaleo	1

Quarter-finals
Pierikos	2
Apollon Athens	0
Proodeftiki	0
AEK Athens	1
Panathinaikos	3
Vyzas Megara	0
Olympiacos	5
Atromitos	1

Semi-finals
Pierikos	1
AEK Athens	3
Panathinaikos	1
Olympiacos	1

Final
AEK Athens

== Round of 32 ==
Team 1	Score/Agg.	Team 2	Match	Replay
Anagennisi Arta	0–7	AEK Athens		
AEK Kalamata	1–5	Panionios		
Olympiacos	10–2	Rodiakos		
Pagchaniakos	0–1	Ethnikos Piraeus		
Panathinaikos	4–1	Elpida Drama		
Apollon Athens	3–0	Pallamiaki Enosi		
Fostiras	0–2	Pierikos		
Panegialios	0–1	Proodeftiki		
Edessaikos	1–4	PAOK		
Olympiacos Kozani	4–1	Apollon Kalamarias	2–2 (a.e.t.)	2–1
Averoff Ioannina	0–2	Iraklis		
Aris	1–0	Aris Ptolemaida		
Niki Volos	6–2	Achilleas Triandria		
Vyzas Megara	3–0	Chalandri		
Egaleo	2–1	Attikos		
Chalkida	0–2	Atromitos		

== Round of 16 ==
Team 1	Score/Agg.	Team 2	Match	Replay
Olympiacos Kozani	3–6	Vyzas Megara	2–2 (a.e.t.)	1–4
Aris	0–2 (a.e.t.)	Panathinaikos		
Olympiacos	2–0	Iraklis		
PAOK	0–3 (a.e.t.)	AEK Athens		
Panionios	1–2 (a.e.t.)	Proodeftiki		
Atromitos	2–1	Egaleo		
Pierikos	1–0	Niki Volos		
Ethnikos Piraeus	0–1	Apollon Athens		

== Quarter-finals ==
Team 1	Score	Team 2
Panathinaikos	3–0	Vyzas Megara
Pierikos	2–0	Apollon Athens
Proodeftiki	0–1	AEK Athens
Olympiacos	5–1	Atromitos

== Semi-finals ==
Team 1	Score	Team 2
Pierikos	1–3	AEK Athens
Panathinaikos	1–1^{*} (a.e.t.)	Olympiacos

^{*} The match was abandoned in the 115th minute with the score at 1–1 due to riots from the supporters of both clubs against their teams for the same reasons that the 1961–62 final was abandoned; both teams were ejected from the competition.

== Final ==
The final was scratched and AEK Athens were awarded the Cup after Panathinaikos and Olympiacos were ejected from the competition.
