= 1962–63 Alpha Ethniki =

27th season of top-tier football league in Greece

Alpha Ethniki
- Season: 1962–63
- Champions: AEK Athens; 3rd Greek title
- Relegated: Proodeftiki; Fostiras
- European Cup: AEK Athens
- Cup Winners' Cup: Olympiacos
- Inter-Cities Fairs Cup: Iraklis
- Matches: 240
- Goals: 602 (2.51 per match)
- Top goalscorer: Kostas Nestoridis (23 goals)

The 1962–63 Alpha Ethniki was the 27th season of the highest football league of Greece. The season began on 23 September 1962 and ended on 30 June 1963 with the play-off match. AEK Athens won their third Greek title and their first in 23 years.

The point system was: Win: 3 points - Draw: 2 points - Loss: 1 point.

== Teams ==
Promoted from 1962 Beta Ethniki	Relegated from 1961–62 Alpha Ethniki
Panegialios; Pierikos	Panelefsiniakos; Doxa Drama

Location of teams in 1962–63 Alpha Ethniki

== League table ==
Pos	Team	Pld	W	D	L	GF	GA	GR	Pts	Qualification or relegation
1	AEK Athens (C)	30	20	7	3	66	21	3.143	77 (Note: Championship play-off: AEK Athens–Panathinaikos 3–3, AEK Athens become the champions due to the better total goal ratio. (see below).)	Qualification for European Cup preliminary round
2	Panathinaikos	30	19	9	2	75	28	2.679	77	
3	Olympiacos	30	19	7	4	62	39	1.590	75	Qualification for Cup Winners' Cup first round
4	PAOK	30	13	8	9	44	34	1.294	64	
5	Ethnikos Piraeus	30	12	9	9	47	41	1.146	63	
6	Iraklis	30	11	10	9	35	38	0.921	62	Invitation for Inter-Cities Fairs Cup first round
7	Panionios	30	10	11	9	33	38	0.868	61	
8	Apollon Athens	30	8	12	10	35	34	1.029	58	
9	Pierikos	30	9	7	14	36	37	0.973	55 (Note: 9th place play-off: Pierikos–Egaleo 3–1.)	
10	Egaleo (Note: Egaleo were deducted 1 point.)	30	10	6	14	27	44	0.614	55	
11	Niki Volos	30	8	8	14	24	39	0.615	54	
12	Apollon Kalamarias	30	6	11	13	18	32	0.563	53 (Note: Relegation play-out: Aris–Proodeftiki 3–1, Apollon Kalamarias–Panegialios 1–1, Panegialios–Aris 0–0, Apollon Kalamarias–Proodeftiki 1–1, Panegialios–Proodeftiki 1–0, Apollon Kalamarias–Aris 3–1, Apollon Kalamarias 7pts, Panegialios 7pts, Aris 6pts, Proodeftiki 4pts.)	
13	Panegialios	30	8	7	15	25	37	0.676	53	
14	Aris	30	9	5	16	22	44	0.500	53	
15	Proodeftiki (R)	30	7	9	14	26	43	0.605	53	Relegation to Beta Ethniki
16	Fostiras (R)	30	6	4	20	27	53	0.509	46	Relegation to Beta Ethniki

Source: RSSSF
Rules for classification: 1st points; 2nd decision match; 3rd head-to-head goal ratio.
(C) Champions; (R) Relegated

== Results ==
Home \ Away	AEK	APA	APK	ARIS	EGA	ETH	FOS	IRA	NIK	OLY	PAO	PNE	PAN	PAOK	PIE	PRO
AEK Athens		4–3	1–0	3–1	7–2	4–0	3–1	5–0	2–0	2–2	0–2	2–1	3–0	5–1	3–1	0–0
Apollon Athens	0–0		1–0	3–0	0–1	2–2	2–1	0–0	2–0	2–3	0–1	0–0	1–1	1–0	1–1	2–0
Apollon Kalamarias	0–3	2–2		1–0	0–1	0–0	4–1	0–0	0–1	1–0	0–0	0–0	1–0	0–0	2–1	0–1
Aris	0–1	1–0	2–1		1–0	2–1	3–1	1–1	2–1	0–1	1–2	3–2 (Note: Aris–Panegialios 1–1, replayed 3–2.)	1–0	0–3	0–0	0–0
Egaleo	0–3	1–3	0–0	1–0		0–3	1–0	2–0	1–0	2–2	0–5	2–0	0–2	1–3	2–0	1–1
Ethnikos Piraeus	1–0	1–1	2–0	2–0	2–1		1–0	3–2	1–1	1–1	4–2	1–2	1–1	1–1	1–1	3–3
Fostiras	1–3	0–0	0–0	1–0	1–1	2–0		0–1	3–1	0–1	3–4	0–1	0–0	0–2	0–3	2–0
Iraklis	0–0	1–1	2–3	2–1	1–0	2–0	2–1		1–0	1–2	0–0	3–1	1–1	3–0	2–1	3–0
Niki Volos	0–0	1–2	2–2	0–1	0–1	1–0	1–0	2–0		0–3	2–2	2–1	1–0	0–0	1–1	2–2
Olympiacos	1–3	2–1	0–0	3–1	3–1	2–1	4–3	2–2	4–1		3–2	1–0	4–1	3–2	2–1	5–2
Panathinaikos	1–1	2–2	6–1	4–0	1–1	2–0	6–0	4–0	5–0	2–0		2–1	3–2	2–1	3–0	3–0
Panegialios	0–2	2–1	0–0	2–0	1–0	0–3	1–2	0–0	1–2	1–0	1–2		1–1	1–1	2–1	1–0
Panionios	2–1	2–1	1–0	0–0	1–1	1–4	2–1	2–1	1–0	1–1	4–4	0–0		3–2	2–1	0–2
PAOK	0–3	2–0	1–0	3–0	2–0	3–2	2–0	4–1	0–2	2–2	1–1	2–1	1–1		2–0	3–0
Pierikos	1–1	0–0	3–0	4–0	2–1	2–3	2–0	2–3	1–0	1–2	0–0	3–1	0–1	1–0		2–1
Proodeftiki	0–1	3–1	1–0	1–1	0–2	2–3	2–3	0–0	0–0	2–3	0–2	1–0	1–0	0–0	1–0	

Source: RSSSF
Legend: Blue = home team win; Yellow = draw; Red = away team win.

=== Championship play-off ===
23 June 1963
17:30 EET

AEK Athens	3–3	Panathinaikos
Papaioannou 24', 27'; Nestoridis 39'	Report	Panagiotidis 9'; Linoxilakis 65'; Toumpelis 66'

AEK Stadium, Nea Filadelfeia
Attendance: 35,000
Referee: Andries Van Leeuwen (Netherlands)

AEK Athens won due to the better total goal ratio.

== Top scorers ==
Rank	Player	Club	Goals
1	(Greece) Kostas Nestoridis	AEK Athens	23
2	(Greece) Vangelis Panakis	Panathinaikos	21
3	(Greece) Giorgos Sideris	Olympiacos	18
4	(Greece) Mimis Papaioannou	AEK Athens	17
5	(Greece) Andreas Papaemmanouil	Panathinaikos	15
6	(Greece) Andreas Antonatos	Ethnikos Piraeus	14
6	(Greece) Stelios Psychos	Olympiacos	14

== Attendances ==
Panathinaikos drew the highest average home attendance in the 1962–63 Alpha Ethniki.

#	Team	Average attendance
1	Panathinaikos	19,160
2	Olympiacos	18,578
3	AEK Athens	18,508
4	PAOK	8,005
5	Ethnikos Piraeus	7,702
6	Aris	6,256
7	Proodeftiki	6,087
8	Fostiras	5,504
9	Apollon Athens	4,923
10	Iraklis	4,390
11	Panionios	4,270
12	Niki Volos	3,924
13	Pierikos	3,813
14	Apollon Kalamarias	3,639
15	Egaleo	3,437
16	Panegialios	3,001
