= 1963 Greek Football Cup final =

1963 Greek Cup final
- Event: 1962–63 Greek Football Cup
Olympiacos	Pierikos
3	0
- Date: 18 July 1963
- Venue: Leoforos Alexandras Stadium, Ampelokipoi, Athens
- Referee: Otmar Humber (Switzerland)
- Attendance: 25,000

The 1963 Greek Cup final was the 21st final of the Greek Cup. The match took place on 18 July 1963 at Karaiskakis Stadium. The contesting teams were Olympiacos and Pierikos. It was Olympiacos' thirteenth Greek Cup final and eighth consecutive in their 38 years of existence and Pierikos' first ever Greek Cup final in their 2-year history. A remarkable fact was that Pierikos reached their first and only Cup final, only two years after their foundation with the merger of Megas Alexandros Katerinis and Olympos Katerinis. It was also the first time in the history of the institution, that a Cup final took place at night and was held under floodlights.

== Venue ==
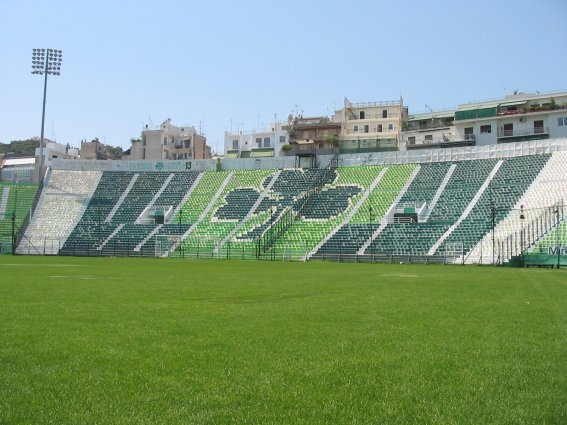
Leoforos Alexandras Stadium.

This was the seventeenth Greek Cup final held at Leoforos Alexandras Stadium, after the 1932, 1939, 1940, 1947, 1948, 1949, 1950, 1951, 1952, 1953, 1954, 1955, 1956, 1959, 1960 and 1961 finals. (Leoforos also hosted the replay match of the 1933 final between Ethnikos Piraeus and Aris, the replay match of the 1949 final between AEK Athens and Panathinaikos and the replay match of the 1952 final between Olympiacos and Panionios).

Leoforos Alexandras Stadium was built in 1922. The stadium is used as a venue for Panathinaikos and Greece. Its current capacity is 30,000.

== Background ==
Olympiacos had reached the Greek Cup final twelve times, winning ten of them. The last time that they had won the Cup was in 1961 (3–0 against Panionios). The last time that had played in a final was in 1962, against Panathinaikos, where the match was abandoned at the extra time.

Pierikos had never competed in a Cup final.

The two teams had never met each other in a Cup final.

== Route to the final ==
Olympiacos				Round	Pierikos			
Opponent	Agg.	1st leg	2nd leg		Opponent	Agg.	1st leg	2nd leg
Pagchaniakos	6–1 (A)			Round of 32	Anagennisi Giannitsa	2–0 (A)		
Panionios	2–1 (H)			Round of 16	Ethnikos Piraeus	2–1 (H)		
Panathinaikos	5–3 (H)			Quarter-finals	Niki Volos	3–2	0–0 (a.e.t.) (A)	3–2 (H)
Aris	6–3	1–1 (a.e.t.) (A)	5–2 (H)	Semi-finals	Proodeftiki	4–0 (H)		

== Match ==
=== Details ===
18 July 1963

Olympiacos	3–0	Pierikos
Polychroniou 30'; Papazoglou 39'; Sideris 65'	Report

Leoforos Alexandras Stadium, Ampelokipoi
Attendance: 25,000
Referee: Otmar Humber (Switzerland)

Olympiacos	Pierikos

GK	(Greece) Stathis Tsanaktsis
DF	(Greece) Giangos Simantiris
DF	(Greece) Dimitrios Stefanakos
DF	(Greece) Thanasis Loukanidis
MF	(Greece) Kostas Polychroniou (c)
MF	(Greece) Sotiris Gavezos
MF	(Greece) Nikos Sideris
MF	(Greece) Thanasis Bebis
FW	(Greece) Giorgos Sideris
FW	(Greece) Aris Papazoglou
FW	(Greece) Stelios Psychos
Manager:
(Greece) Giannis Chelmis

GK	(Greece) Vangelis Drandakis
DF	(Greece) Giorgos Kefalidis
DF	(Greece) Paraskevas Portokalidis
DF	(Greece) Giannis Mystakidis
DF	(Greece) Alexandros Taxidis
MF	(Greece) Theodoros Sidiropoulos
MF	(Greece) Michalis Amanatidis
MF	(Greece) Polychronis Fourlidis (c)
MF	(Greece) Theodoros Kyziroglou
FW	(Greece) Kostas Orfanidis
FW	(Greece) Giannis Christoforidis
Manager:
(Socialist Federal Republic of Yugoslavia) Alexi Petrović

Match rules

- 90 minutes
- 30 minutes of extra time if necessary
- Replay match if scores still level

== See also ==
- 1962–63 Greek Football Cup
