= 1961 Greek Football Cup final =

1961 Greek Cup final
- Event: 1960–61 Greek Football Cup
Olympiacos	Panionios
3	0
- Date: 2 July 1961
- Venue: Leoforos Alexandras Stadium, Ampelokipoi, Athens
- Referee: Cezare Jonni (Italy)
- Attendance: 25,000

The 1961 Greek Cup final was the 19th final of the Greek Cup. The match took place on 2 July 1961 at Leoforos Alexandras Stadium. The contesting teams were Olympiacos and Panionios. It was Olympiacos' eleventh Greek Cup final and sixth consecutive in their 36 years of existence and Panionios' second Greek Cup final in their 71-year history. With the conquest of the Cup, Olympiacos became the only team to win the trophy five times in a row.

== Venue ==
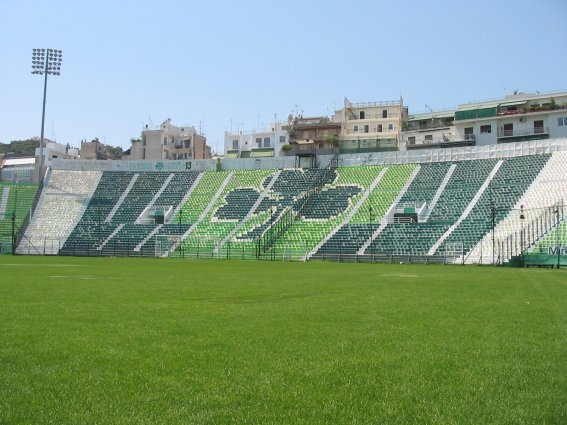
Leoforos Alexandras Stadium.

This was the sixteenth Greek Cup final held at Leoforos Alexandras Stadium, after the 1932, 1939, 1940, 1947, 1948, 1949, 1950, 1951, 1952, 1953, 1954, 1955, 1956, 1959 and 1960 finals. (Leoforos also hosted the replay match of the 1933 final between Ethnikos Piraeus and Aris, the replay match of the 1949 final between AEK Athens and Panathinaikos and the replay match of the 1952 final between Olympiacos and Panionios).

Leoforos Alexandras Stadium was built in 1922. The stadium is used as a venue for Panathinaikos and Greece. Its current capacity is 30,000.

== Background ==
Olympiacos had reached the Greek Cup final ten times, winning nine of them. The last time that they had played in a final was in 1960, where they won Panathinaikos by 3–0 in a replay match, after the 1–1 of the initial match.

Panionios had reached the Greek Cup final one time in 1952, where they had lost to Olympiacos by 2–0 in a replay match, after the 2–2 of the initial match.

The two teams had met each other in a Cup final one time in the 1952 final.

== Route to the final ==
Olympiacos		Round	Panionios	
Opponent	Result		Opponent	Result
Panachaiki	4–2 (H)	Round of 32	Atlantida Chania	2–0 (A)
Aris	3–2 (H)	Round of 16	Iraklis Kavala	3–0 (H)
Apollon Athens	2–1 (A)	Quarter-finals	Panathinaikos	2–1 (H)
Doxa Drama	3–0 (H)	Semi-finals	Iraklis	1–0 (H)

== Match ==
=== Details ===
2 July 1961
17:00 EET

Olympiacos	3–0	Panionios
Papazoglou 34'; Sideris 69', 88'	Report

Leoforos Alexandras Stadium, Ampelokipoi
Attendance: 25,000
Referee: Cezare Jonni (Italy)

GK	(Greece) Stathis Tsanaktsis
DF	(Greece) Ilias Rosidis (c)
DF	(Greece) Dimitrios Stefanakos
DF	(Greece) Giangos Simantiris
MF	(Greece) Kostas Polychroniou
MF	(Greece) Takis Spetseris
FW	(Greece) Sotiris Gavezos
FW	(Greece) Kostas Papazoglou
FW	(Greece) Tasos Sourounis
FW	(Greece) Giorgos Sideris
FW	(Greece) Antonis Poseidon
Manager:
(Socialist Federal Republic of Yugoslavia) Kiril Simonovski

GK	(Greece) Stelios Sochos
DF	(Greece) Grigoris Kapsis
DF	(Greece) Takis Papoulidis
DF	(Greece) Thanasis Christou
MF	(Greece) Stathis Mavridis
MF	(Greece) Georgios Giannakopoulos
FW	(Greece) Stathis Chaitas (c)
FW	(Greece) Achileas Athanasoulas
FW	(Greece) Thanasis Saravakos
FW	(Greece) Giannis Giannakopoulos
FW	(Greece) Adam Chronopoulos
Manager:
(Greece) Ioannis Skordilis

Assistant referees:
Anosia (Italy)
Tomenico (Italy)

Match rules

- 90 minutes
- 30 minutes of extra time if necessary
- Replay match if scores still level

== See also ==
- 1960–61 Greek Football Cup
