= 1962 Greek Football Cup final =

1962 Greek Cup final
- Event: 1961–62 Greek Football Cup
Olympiacos	Panathinaikos
0	0
- Abandoned at the 97th minute.
- Date: 27 June 1962
- Venue: AEK Stadium, Nea Filadelfia, Athens
- Referee: Andre Möhler (Switzerland)
- Attendance: 28,155

The 1962 Greek Cup final was the 20th final of the Greek Cup. The match took place on 27 June 1962 at AEK Stadium. The contesting teams were Olympiacos and Panathinaikos. It was Olympiacos' twelfth Greek Cup final and seventh consecutive in their 37 years of existence and Panathinaikos' sixth Greek Cup final in their 54-year history. It was an eventful and a harsh match that was marked by three red cards in a first half, which in fact lasted 66 minutes, due to the continuous interruptions. The intermission lasted 30 minutes and spectators became suspicious that both teams had arranged for a draw in order to make more money from the replay match that would occur according to the regulation at the time. Thus the hurled objects on to the pitch. The second half went smoothly with the spectators persisting in booing the footballers of both teams. The score remained at 0–0 and the match went to extra time. However, with the 21-minute delay at the beginning of the match and since there were no floodlights in the stadium, darkness set in. As a result, the referee interrupted the match at the 97th minute. The HFF, fearful of reactions of the crowd, declined to arrange a replay match, so while there the final took place, there was no winner and conclusively there no runner-up. Nevertheless, Olympiacos qualified for the next season's European Cup Winners' Cup, since Panathinaikos emerged as the champions of that year.

== Venue ==
This was the first Greek Cup final held at AEK Stadium.

AEK Stadium was built in 1930. The stadium is used as a venue for AEK Athens and was used for Greece on various occasions. Its current capacity is 32,000.

== Background ==
Olympiacos had reached the Greek Cup final eleven times, winning ten of them. The last time that they had played in a final was in 1961, where they won Panionios by 3–0.

Panathinaikos had reached the Greek Cup final five times, winning three of them. The last time that they had won the Cup was in 1955 (1–0 against PAOK). The last time that had played in a final was in 1960, where they had lost to Olympiacos by 3–0 in a replay match, after the 1–1 of the initial match.

The two teams had met each other in a Cup final one time in the 1960 final.

== Route to the final ==
Olympiacos				Round	Panathinaikos			
Opponent	Agg.	1st leg	2nd leg		Opponent	Agg.	1st leg	2nd leg
Olympiacos Chalkida	7–1 (H)			Round of 32	Egaleo	2–0 (H)		
OFI	9–0 (H)			Round of 16	Averof Ioannina	3–0 (H)		
Aris	3–2 (H)			Quarter-finals	Apollon Kalamarias	6–1 (H)		
Panionios	4–3	1–1 (a.e.t.) (H)	3–2 (A)	Semi-finals	Apollon Athens	5–3 (H)		

== Match ==
=== Details ===
27 June 1962
17:00 EET

Olympiacos	0–0 (Abandoned at the 97th minute) (a.e.t.)	Panathinaikos
	Report

AEK Stadium, Nea Filadelfia
Attendance: 28,155
Referee: Andre Möhler (Switzerland)

GK	(Greece) Stathis Tsanaktsis
DF	(Greece) Dimitris Plessas
DF	(Greece) Dimitrios Stefanakos
DF	(Greece) Giangos Simantiris
MF	(Greece) Kostas Polychroniou (c)
MF	(Greece) Savvas Papazoglou	(red card) 5'
MF	(Greece) Thanasis Bebis
FW	(Greece) Kostas Papazoglou
FW	(Greece) Elias Yfantis
FW	(Greece) Aris Papazoglou	(red card) 43'
FW	(Greece) Stelios Psychos
Manager:
(Greece) Alekos Chatzistavridis

GK	(Greece) Michalis Voutsaras
DF	(Greece) Nikos Tzounakos
DF	(Greece) Kostas Linoxilakis (c)
DF	(Greece) Aristidis Kamaras
MF	(Greece) Zacharias Pytichoutis
MF	(Greece) Giorgos Andreou
MF	(Greece) Mimis Domazos
FW	(Greece) Andreas Papaemmanouil	(red card) 5'
FW	(Greece) Kostas Toumpelis
FW	(Greece) Dimitris Theofanis
FW	(Greece) Vangelis Panakis
Manager:
(England) Harry Game

Assistant referees:
Barot (Switzerland)
Giakoj (Switzerland)

Match rules

- 90 minutes
- 30 minutes of extra time if necessary
- Replay match if scores still level

== See also ==
- 1961–62 Greek Football Cup
