= 1960–61 AEK Athens F.C. season =

AEK Athens
1960–61 season
- Chairman: Nikos Goumas
- Manager: Lukas Aurednik (until 8 January); Tryfon Tzanetis
- Stadium: AEK Stadium
- Alpha Ethniki: 4th
- Greek Cup: Quarter-finals
- Balkans Cup: 5th
- Top goalscorer: League: Kostas Nestoridis (27); All: Kostas Nestoridis (44)
- Highest home attendance: 28,268 vs Olympiacos (4 June 1961)
- Lowest home attendance: 2,000 vs PAO Kalogreza (8 March 1961)
- Average home league attendance: 11,928
- Biggest win: AEK Athens 9–0 AE Kesarianis
- Biggest defeat: Fenerbahçe 5–1 AEK Athens
Home colours

The 1960–61 season was the 37th season in the existence of AEK Athens F.C. and the second consecutive season in the top flight of Greek football. They competed in the Alpha Ethniki, the Greek Cup and the Balkans Cup. The season began on 18 September 1960 and finished on 25 June 1961.

== Overview ==
AEK Athens continued this season with one of their "Patriarchs", Tryfon Tzanetis in the technical leadership, who was officially hired in January with the task of revitalizing the team. However, his predecessor, Lukas Aurednik, remained in the team and alongside Christos Ribas formed a coaching triumvirate with Tzanetis apparently having the first say, but Auretnik maintaining the tactical support and the acceptance of the majority of the supporters. Aurednik promoted the prominent winger, Spyros Pomonis from the academy, while the signings of Thanasis Gouvas from A.E. Messolonghi and Aris Tsachouridis from Makedonikos were also noteworthy.

The first objections to the objectivity of the referees begun and made their appearance in Greek football, culminating in the Athenian derby, in the following matchday. Three days before the match there was strong dissatisfaction with the presence of certain people from Panathinaikos in the central arbitration committee. AEK was severely wronged by the referee Ioannidis and the dissatisfaction was confirmed since the referee denied an obvious penalty to Nestoridis in the 87th minute and while the score was 2–2. In the tension that followed, the referee showed Anastasiadis a red card and the refusal of the latter to come out of the pitch resulted in the game being awarded to Panathinaikos and AEK being zeroed. Another 2 consecutive defeats followed, which kept AEK away from the top.

AEK entered the Cup facing AE Kaisarianis at the first round and they achieved one of the highest scoring victories in their history by 9–0 at home. At the second round they eliminated Agioi Anargyroi easily by 5–1 at home and then Doxa Metaxourgio with a 3–2 home win for the third round. Afterwards they played against PAO Kalogreza and eliminated them by 2–1 at home and at the fifth round they faced Niki Plakas and won with a triumphant 8–1 at home. In the round of 32, AEK came across Prasina Poulia, one of the historic teams from Kalamata, who came to compete in Athens for the first time. The match was held under intense emotional charge due to the presence of the former player of both clubs, Kleanthis Maropoulos and the Messinian team held a historic 2–2 draw until the 60th minute, when AEK "woke up" and in the end the result was a satisfying 7–3. At the round of 16, they easily eliminated Proodetiki by 4–1 at home, and were qualified to the quarter-finals. There, they faced Iraklis at Thessaloniki and were defeated by 1–0, ending their campaign in the tournament.

The incidents with the referees continued, with the suspension of the match against Proodeftiki and its resumption 4 months later, as on 18 February at Karaiskakis Stadium. At the 80th minute and while the game was at 1–1, Gouvas scored a goal where the ball hit the inner post at the bottom of the goal and went out again with the referee indicating "play on", considering that the ball hit the post. A scuffle between players followed on the pitch and after several incidents the referee called it off and it was repeated on 14 June, when AEK was indifferent and mathematically out of the title. In the rest of the season, the team briought mediocre results, losing in both matches to the then strong Panionios, while they achieved a 4–1 victory over Olympiacos. The 27 goals scored by Kostas Nestoridis, who emerged again as the top scorer of the league, did not manage to give AEK anything better than fourth place.

== Management team ==
Position	Staff
Manager	(Greece) Tryfon Tzanetis
Assistant manager	(Austria) Lukas Aurednik
Assistant manager	(Greece) Christos Ribas

== Players ==
=== Squad information ===
NOTE: The players are the ones that have been announced by the AEK Athens' press release. No edits should be made unless a player arrival or exit is announced. Updated 25 June 1961, 23:59 UTC+2.

Player	Nat.	Position(s)	Date of birth (Age)	Signed	Previous club	Transfer fee
Goalkeepers
Sotiris Fakis	(Greece)	GK	1934 (aged 26–27)	1957	(Greece) Amyna Ampelokipoi	Free
Stelios Serafidis	(Greece)	GK	6 August 1935 (aged 25)	1953	(Greece) AEK Athens U20	—
Kimon Dimitriou	(Greece)	GK	1938 (aged 22–23)	1959	(Greece) Propontis Chalkida	Free
Defenders
Giannis Marditsis	(Greece)	CB / ST	19 February 1933 (aged 28)	1959	(Greece) Egaleo	₯103,000
Petros Stamatelopoulos	(Greece)	LB	19 March 1934 (aged 27)	1959	(Greece) Panerythraikos	₯100,000
Nikos Melissis	(Greece)	CB / DM / ST	1936 (aged 24–25)	1953	(Greece) PAO Kalogreza	Free
Mimis Anastasiadis	(Greece)	RB / CB / ST	26 October 1936 (aged 24)	1956	(Greece) A.O. Nea Ionia	Free
Antonis Gavanas	(Greece)	CB	1938 (aged 22–23)	1957	(Greece) Ethnikos Asteras	Free
Theofilos Vernezis	(Greece)	RB / CB / GK	1938 (aged 22–23)	1956	(Greece) AEK Athens U20	—
Dimitris Tzaneras	(Greece)	CB / DM	1942 (aged 18–19)	1960	(Greece) Atromitos Piraeus	Free
Dimitris Diakakis	(Greece)	CB	1942 (aged 18–19)	1959	Free agent	Free
Midfielders
Pavlos Emmanouilidis	(Greece)	RM / RW / ST / SS	15 October 1929 (aged 31)	1947	(Greece) AEK Athens U20	—
Thymios Polyzos	(Greece)	CM	1931 (aged 29–30)	1956	(Greece) Asteras Athens	Free
Miltos Papapostolou	(Greece)	DM / CB	9 September 1935 (aged 25)	1956	(Greece) Egaleo	Free
Giorgos Petridis	(Greece)	AM / SS / ST / LW	10 February 1938 (aged 23)	1957	(Greece) Pera Club	Free
Stelios Skevofilakas	(Greece)	LM / RM / AM / CM	6 January 1939 (aged 22)	1961	(Greece) Eleftheroupoli	Free
Thanasis Gouvas	(Greece)	AM / RW / SS / ST	April 1939 (aged 22)	1960	(Greece) A.E. Messolonghi	Free
Alekos Daispangos	(Greece)	DM / CB	1942 (aged 18–19)	1960	(Greece) AEK Athens U20	—
Forwards
Kostas Nestoridis	(Greece)	ST / SS / LW / RW	15 March 1930 (aged 31)	1955	(Greece) Panionios	Free
Alekos Sofianidis	(Greece) (Turkey)	LW / LM / LB	3 August 1935 (aged 25)	1959	(Turkey) Beşiktaş	Free
Andreas Stamatiadis (Captain)	(Greece)	RW / LW / SS / AM	16 August 1935 (aged 25)	1952	(Greece) AEK Athens U20	—
Dimitris Tsanoulas	(Greece)	ST	1936 (aged 24–25)	1956	Free agent	Free
Christos Ampos	(Greece)	LW / SS / ST	19 October 1937 (aged 23)	1955	(Greece) A.O. Kifisia	Free
Argyris Argyropoulos	(Greece)	ST	1939 (aged 21–22)	1958	(Greece) AEK Athens U20	—
Nikos Zagotsis	(Greece)	ST / SS	16 March 1940 (aged 21)	1960	(Greece) AEK Athens U20	—
Aris Tsachouridis	(Greece)	LW / LM / RM / RW	10 December 1940 (aged 20)	1960	(Greece) Makedonikos	Free
Stefanos Demiris	(Greece)	ST / SS / AM	19 January 1941 (aged 20)	1959	(Greece) AE Kavala	—
Spyros Pomonis	(Greece)	LW / LM	12 February 1944 (aged 17)	1960	(Greece) AEK Athens U20	—

== Transfers ==
=== In ===
Pos.	Player	From	Fee	Date	Source
DF	(Greece) Dimitris Tzaneras	(Greece) Atromitos Piraeus	Free transfer	1 July 1960	
MF	(Greece) Alekos Daispangos	(Greece) AEK Athens U20	Promotion	1 July 1960	
MF	(Greece) Thanasis Gouvas	(Greece) A.E. Messolonghi	Free transfer	1 July 1960	
FW	(Greece) Aris Tsachouridis	(Greece) Makedonikos	Free transfer	1 July 1960	
FW	(Greece) Spyros Pomonis	(Greece) AEK Athens U20	Promotion	1 July 1960	
FW	(Greece) Nikos Zagotsis	(Greece) AEK Athens U20	Promotion	1 July 1960	

=== Out ===
Pos.	Player	To	Fee	Date	Source
DF	(Greece) Thanasis Tsangaris	(Greece) Panerythraikos	Contract termination	1 July 1960	
MF	(Greece) Kostas Zografos	Free agent	Contract termination	1 July 1960	
MF	(Greece) Samaras	Free agent	Contract termination	1 July 1960	
FW	(Greece) Loukas Sismanis	Free agent	Contract termination	1 July 1960	

=== Loan in ===
Pos.	Player	From	Fee	Date	Until	Option to buy	Source
MF	(Greece) Stelios Skevofilakas	(Greece) Eleftheroupoli	Free	1 April 1961	30 June 1961	✓	

=== Overall transfer activity ===
Expenditure: ▼ ₯0

Income: ▲ ₯0

Net Total: ₯0

== Pre-season and friendlies ==
4 September 1960 Friendly	AEK Athens	7–1	Dafni Dafniou	Nea Filadelfeia
	Goal		Goal	Stadium: AEK Stadium

14 September 1960 Friendly	AEK Athens	1–1	A.S.D.A.N	Nea Filadelfeia
	Goal		Goal	Stadium: AEK Stadium

26 October 1960 Friendly	AEK Athens	5–0	Aris Petroupolis	Nea Filadelfeia
	Goal			Stadium: AEK Stadium

2 November 1960 Friendly	AEK Athens	7–2	Attikos	Nea Filadelfeia
	Goal		Goal	Stadium: AEK Stadium

9 November 1960 Friendly	Trofonios	0–6	AEK Athens
			Goal

25 December 1960 Christmas Cup	AEK Athens	1–3	Partizan	Nea Filadelfeia
	Goal		Goal	Stadium: AEK Stadium

8 February 1961 Friendly	AEK Athens	0–0	Greece military	Nea Filadelfeia
				Stadium: AEK Stadium

22 March 1961 Friendly	Greece	5–1	AEK Athens
	Goal		Goal

1 April 1961 Friendly	AEK Athens	2–4	Fenerbahçe	Nea Filadelfeia
16:00 EET (UTC+2)	Loukanidis 45'; Toumpelis 76'	Report	Erdem 30'; Bartu 42', 46'; Gündüz 65'	Stadium: AEK Stadium; Attendance: 31,960
Note: The footballers of Panathinaikos, Takis Loukanidis, Kostas Toumpelis, Vangelis Panakis and Dimitris Pyrgolios competed with AEK.

12 April 1961 Friendly	AEK Athens	3–0	Greece gendarmerie	Nea Filadelfeia
	Goal			Stadium: AEK Stadium

28 May 1961 Friendly	AE Nikopolis	2–2	AEK Athens
	Goal		Goal

28 June 1961 Friendly	AEK Athens	0–3	Santos	Ampelokipoi
		Report	Pelé 36'; Coutinho 40', 44'	Stadium: Leoforos Alexandras Stadium; Attendance: 16,823; Referee: Dimosthenis Stathatos (Athens)

28 June 1961 Friendly	Fenerbahçe	0–2	AEK Athens	Ampelokipoi
			Goal	Stadium: Leoforos Alexandras Stadium

== Competitions ==
=== Overall record ===
Competition	First match	Last match	Starting round	Final position	Record							
Competition	First match	Last match	Starting round	Final position	Pld	W	D	L	GF	GA	GD	Win %
Alpha Ethniki	18 September 1960	25 June 1961	Matchday 1	4th	30	17	6	7	64	32	+32	56.67
Greek Cup	11 December 1960	7 June 1961	First round	Quarter-finals	8	7	0	1	38	10	+28	87.50
Balkans Cup	15 February 1961	17 May 1961	Group stage	Group stage	8	1	1	6	8	24	−16	12.50
Total					46	25	7	14	110	66	+44	54.35

Last updated: 25 June 1961
Source: Competitions

=== Alpha Ethniki ===
==== League table ====
Pos	Team	Pld	W	D	L	GF	GA	GD	Pts	Qualification or relegation
2	Olympiacos	30	19	5	6	62	23	+39	73	Qualification for Cup Winners' Cup first round
3	Panionios	30	17	6	7	55	37	+18	70	
4	AEK Athens (Note: AEK Athens and Atromitos Piraeus were deducted 1 points each.)	30	17	6	7	64	32	+32	69	
5	Apollon Athens	30	10	13	7	56	41	+15	63	
6	Ethnikos Piraeus	30	11	10	9	33	29	+4	62 (Note: 6th place play-off: Ethnikos Piraeus–Doxa Drama 2–1.)	

Source: RSSSF
Rules for classification: 1st points; 2nd decision match; 3rd head-to-head goal difference.

==== Results summary ====
Overall								Home						Away					
Pld	W	D	L	GF	GA	GD	Pts	W	D	L	GF	GA	GD	W	D	L	GF	GA	GD
30	17	6	7	64	32	+32	69	11	3	1	38	10	+28	6	3	6	26	22	+4

Source: Competitive matches

==== Results by Matchday ====
Round	1	2	3	4	5	6	7	8	9	10	11	12	13	14	15	16	17	18	19	20	21	22	23	24	25	26	27	28	29	30
Ground	Η	A	H	A	H	A	H	H	A	H	A	A	A	H	H	A	H	A	H	A	H	A	A	H	A	H	H	H	A	A
Result	W	W	D	L	L	L	W	W	W	W	L	L	W	W	W	D	W	L	W	L	D	W	W	W	D	D	W	W	W	D
Position	1	1	2	7	9	12	10	9	5	5	5	7	6	5	4	4	4	4	4	4	5	4	4	4	4	4	4	3	3	4

Source: Competitive matches
A = Away; H = Home; W = Win; D = Draw; L = Loss; P = Postponed

==== Matches ====
18 September 1960 1	AEK Athens	6–0	Panegialios	Nea Filadelfeia
16:30 EET (UTC+2)	Gouvas 15', 73'; Nestoridis 46', 75', 77'; Stamatiadis 87'			Stadium: AEK Stadium; Attendance: 8,710; Referee: Giorgos Pelomis (Athens)

25 September 1960 2	Apollon Kalamarias	0–3	AEK Athens	Thessaloniki
			Ampos 39'; Nestoridis 75', 76'	Stadium: Toumba Stadium; Attendance: 7,608; Referee: Kostas Tzitzis

2 October 1960 3	AEK Athens	1–1	Proodeftiki	Nea Filadelfeia
16:00 EET (UTC+2)	Stamatiadis 44'		Mesolongitis 2'	Stadium: AEK Stadium; Attendance: 15,820; Referee: Antonis Choumerianos (Heraklion)

2 October 1960 4	Panathinaikos	2–0 (Awarded)	AEK Athens	Ampelokipoi
	Papaemmanouil 30', 49'; Panakis 88'		Gouvas 18'; Stamatiadis 55'; Anastasiadis (red card) 88'	Stadium: Leoforos Alexandras Stadium; Attendance: 23,887; Referee: Aristidis Ioannidis (Thessaloniki)
Note: At the 87th minute the referee denied Nestoridis a clear penalty, when he was brought down by Andreou. While AEK players were still protesting, Panathinaikos went on the counter and scored with Panakis. The yellow-blacks continued protesting, Anastasiadis was sent-off but refused to leave the pitch and eventually the referee decided to suspend the match at the expense of AEK. Panathinaikos were awarded the match by 2–0 and AEK were zeroed.

16 October 1960 5	AEK Athens	1–2	Panionios	Nea Filadelfeia
	Nestoridis 57'		Braoudakis 53'; Saravakos 78'	Stadium: AEK Stadium; Attendance: 15,286; Referee: Periklis Poulias (Athens)

23 October 1960 6	Aris	3–1	AEK Athens	Thessaloniki
	Panagoulias 18'; Papoutsopoulos 61'; Perros 76'		Tsompanis 1' (o.g.)	Stadium: Aris Stadium; Attendance: 6,072; Referee: Giorgos Chavelas (Piraeus)

30 October 1960 7	AEK Athens	3–1	Thermaikos	Nea Filadelfeia
	Nestoridis 7', 64' (pen.); Sofianidis 11'		Xylas 17'	Stadium: Nikos Goumas Stadium; Attendance: 5,857; Referee: Alexandros Monastiriotis (Piraeus)

6 November 1960 8	AEK Athens	1–0	Apollon Athens	Nea Filadelfeia
	Ampos 73'			Stadium: AEK Stadium; Attendance: 17,659; Referee: Vangelis Vernardakis (Piraeus)

13 November 1960 9	Fostiras	0–1	AEK Athens	Nea Smyrni
			Stamatiadis 23'	Stadium: Nea Smyrni Stadium; Attendance: 8,889; Referee: Giannis Korkidis (Athens)

27 November 1960 10	AEK Athens	4–2	Ethnikos Piraeus	Nea Filadelfeia
	Nestoridis 25' (pen.), 42'; Tsachouridis 39'; Stamatiadis 48'		Giakoumakis 49'; Giannitsas 62'; Stamou (red card) 87'	Stadium: AEK Stadium; Attendance: 9,670; Referee: Vangelis Pazaropoulos (Athens)

4 December 1960 11	Doxa Drama	1–0	AEK Athens	Drama
	Ioannou 66'			Stadium: Doxa Drama Stadium; Attendance: 5,710; Referee: Stathis Papavasiliou (Piraeus)

18 December 1960 12	Olympiacos	3–1	AEK Athens	Nea Filadelfeia
	Kotridis 21' (pen.); Poseidon 39'; Bebis 70'		Nestoridis 72'	Stadium: AEK Stadium; Attendance: 20,061; Referee: Othmar Huber (Switzerland)

15 January 1961 13	Iraklis	0–2	AEK Athens	Thessaloniki
15:00 EET (UTC+2)			Ampos 38'; Nestoridis 75'	Stadium: Kaftanzoglio Stadium; Attendance: 4,339; Referee: Kostas Tzitzis

22 January 1961 14	AEK Athens	7–0	Atromitos Piraeus	Nea Filadelfeia
15:00 EET (UTC+2)	Ampos 28'; Nestoridis 40', 51', 80'; Petridis 53'; Demiris 70'; Stamatiadis 74'			Stadium: Nikos Goumas Stadium; Referee: Spanos (Patra)

29 January 1961 15	AEK Athens	3–0	PAOK	Nea Filadelfeia
15:00 EET (UTC+2)	Gouvas 35'; Ampos 42', 67'			Stadium: AEK Stadium; Attendance: 15,000; Referee: Patsanian (Piraeus)

9 September 1961 16	Panegialios	1–1	AEK Athens	Aigio
16:30 EET (UTC+2)	Politis 50'		Nestoridis 85'	Stadium: Aigio National Stadium; Attendance: 3,172; Referee: Alexandros Monastiriotis (Piraeus)

12 February 1961 17	AEK Athens	1–0	Apollon Kalamarias	Nea Filadelfeia
15:15 EET (UTC+2)	Nestoridis 83'			Stadium: AEK Stadium; Attendance: 6,863; Referee: Giorgos Chavelas (Piraeus)

14 June 1961 18	Proodeftiki	4–2	AEK Athens	Piraeus
17:00 EET (UTC+2)	Mesolongitis 20'; Varamentis 51'; Daoutis 72'; Mitosis 84'		Stamatiadis 32'; Nestoridis 68'	Stadium: Karaiskakis Stadium; Attendance: 5,000; Referee: Dimosthenis Stathatos (Athens)
Note: The game was originally held on 18 February. In the 67th minute of the match with the score at 1–1, AEK scored a second goal with Gouvas. The striker's shot was so strong that the ball, hit inside the back of the goal, and returned inside the area. This resulted in referee Bakirtzis not realizing the goal and order to continue the game, despite the advice of linesman Velisarios and the endorsement by the observer Savaris. The match ended in a draw amid protests by the players of AEK. Subsequently, the administration of AEK filed a complaint against the validity of the game, as it was entitled, and in particular as it owed it to such an obvious distortion of the score. On 2 March the Technical Arbitration Committee (TED) acquitted AEK, punished referee Bakirtzis for one year, and ordered the match to be repeated from the beginning, at first on 15 March with foreign referee, but eventually occurred on 14 June at such a time (between the 28th and the 29th matchday) which any outcome left the yellow-blacks indifferent, having already been out of the title race.

26 February 1961 19	AEK Athens	2–1	Panathinaikos	Nea Filadelfeia
15:30 EET (UTC+2)	Petridis 32'; Sofianidis 55'		Papaemmanouil 60'	Stadium: AEK Stadium; Attendance: 26,800; Referee: Jose Camacho Caballero (Spain)

5 March 1961 20	Panionios	2–1	AEK Athens	Nea Smyrni
15:30 EET (UTC+2)	Saravakos 30'; Marditsis 53' (o.g.)		Sofianidis 22'	Stadium: Nea Smyrni Stadium; Attendance: 10,411; Referee: Gastone Roversi (Italy)

12 March 1961 21	AEK Athens	0–0	Aris	Nea Filadelfeia
15:45 EET (UTC+2)				Stadium: AEK Stadium; Attendance: 8,000; Referee: Patsanian (Piraeus)

19 March 1961 22	Thermaikos	2–4	AEK Athens	Thessaloniki
15:45 EET (UTC+2)	Tokmakidis 55'; Xanthopoulos 66'		Sofianidis 4', 58'; Anastasiadis 35' (pen.); Petridis 44'	Stadium: Kaftanzoglio Stadium; Attendance: 634; Referee: Fatouros

26 March 1961 23	Apollon Athens	2–4	AEK Athens	Rizoupoli
16:00 EET (UTC+2)	Mastrakoulis 1'; L. Serafidis 68' (pen.)		Petridis 45'; Nestoridis 54', 66'; Stamatiadis 73'	Stadium: Rizoupoli Stadium; Attendance: 10,616; Referee: Achilleas Grammatikopoulos (Piraeus)
Note: Lambis Serafidis, scored the second goal of Apollon against his younger brother, Stelios, who was the goalkeeper of AEK.

23 April 1961 24	AEK Athens	4–2	Fostiras	Nea Filadelfeia
16:30 EET (UTC+2)	Gouvas 20'; Nestoridis 9', 43', 82' (pen.)		Deimezis 65'; Georgalas 66'	Stadium: AEK Stadium; Attendance: 10,000; Referee: Vangelis Vernardakis (Piraeus)

14 May 1961 25	Ethnikos Piraeus	1–1	AEK Athens	Piraeus
	Pestrofas 62'		Polyzos 83'	Stadium: Karaiskakis Stadium; Referee: Thomas Vergotis (Rhodes)

21 May 1961 26	AEK Athens	0–0	Doxa Drama	Nea Filadelfeia
17:00 EET (UTC+2)				Stadium: AEK Stadium; Referee: Stathis Papavasiliou (Piraeus)

4 June 1961 27	AEK Athens	4–1	Olympiacos	Nea Filadelfeia
17:30 EET (UTC+2)	Papapostolou 49'; Stamatiadis 64'; Nestoridis 80', 87'		Psychos 33'	Stadium: AEK Stadium; Attendance: 28,268; Referee: Jose Camacho Caballero (Spain)
Note: After the end of the match, Olympiacos filed an objection and demanded a repeat of the match, protesting against bad refereeing. The objection was rejected by TED on 15 June with a vote of 2 against 1.

11 June 1961 28	AEK Athens	1–0	Iraklis	Nea Filadelfeia
17:30 EET (UTC+2)	Ampos 13'			Stadium: AEK Stadium; Attendance: 8,000; Referee: Giannis Zogas (Athens)

11 February 1962 29	Atromitos Piraeus	0–4	AEK Athens	Piraeus
15:30 EET (UTC+2)			Demiris 24'; Nestoridis 35'; Gouvas 51', 73'	Stadium: Karaiskakis Stadium; Attendance: 3,000; Referee: Nikiforakis
Note: In the 21st minute, the player of Atromitos Piraeus, Anasopoulos suddenly lost consciousness, while the ball was being played away. He couldn't continue playing afterwards and thus Atromitos played with 10 players in the rest of the match. AEK also finished the game with 10 players, after an injury of Tzaneras at 88th minute who did not return.

25 June 1961 30	PAOK	1–1	AEK Athens	Thessaloniki
17:30 EET (UTC+2)	Raptopoulos 60'		Nestoridis 1'	Stadium: Toumba Stadium; Attendance: 5,000; Referee: Achilleas Grammatikopoulos (Piraeus)

=== Greek Cup ===
==== Matches ====
11 December 1960 First round	AEK Athens	9–0	AE Kesarianis	Nea Filadelfeia
	Emmanouilidis; Stamatiadis; Tsachouridis; Demiris; Ampos			Stadium: AEK Stadium

12 January 1961 Second round	AEK Athens	5–1	Agioi Anargyroi	Nea Filadelfeia
14:30 EET (UTC+2)	Nestoridis 15' (pen.), 35', 49', 50'; Petridis 52'		Pavlis 4'	Stadium: AEK Stadium; Attendance: 3,000; Referee: Nikiforakis (Athens)
Note: The game originally took place on 8 January and even though the pitch had been turned into a lake due to heavy rainfall, the referee Eleftheriadis decided to start the match, but he eventually stopped the game at the 60th minute, while AEK were leading by 1–0 with a goal by Vernezis at the 52nd minute.

1 February 1961 Third round	AEK Athens	3–2	Doxa Metaxourgio	Nea Filadelfeia
15:00 EET (UTC+2)	Emmanouilidis 17'; Nestoridis 55'; Stamatiadis 82'		Kekeris 65'; Kondilis 70'	Stadium: AEK Stadium; Referee: Giannis Kalofysoudis (Athens)

8 March 1961 Fourth round	AEK Athens	2–1	PAO Kalogreza	Nea Filadelfeia
15:00 EET (UTC+2)	Petridis 25'; Stamatiadis 80'		Panakis 75'	Stadium: AEK Stadium; Attendance: 2,000; Referee: Kalomenidis
Note: In the reportage of the time it was reported that in the starting squad of Kalogreza there were 2 players with the surname Loukeris and there was no one with the surname Panakis. In the match report it appeared that there were 2 players with the surname Panakis, and one Loukeris. Kouskounis or Kasinos was the other player named Panakis.

15 March 1961 Fifth round	AEK Athens	8–1	Niki Plaka	Nea Filadelfeia
15:00 EET (UTC+2)	Zagotsis 13', 46', 65'; Demiris 42', 78'; Stamatiadis 51', 60', 70'		Sofianidis 63' (o.g.)	Stadium: Nikos Goumas Stadium; Referee: Alexandros Monastiriotis (Piraeus)

2 April 1961 Round of 32	AEK Athens	7–3	Prasina Poulia	Nea Filadelfeia
15:15 EET (UTC+2)	Sofianidis 4'; Nestoridis 45', 59', 62', 80'; Stamatiadis 67', 83'		Korogonas 7'; Damianakos 50'; Paraskevakos 89'	Stadium: Nikos Goumas Stadium; Referee: Vangelis Vernardakis (Piraeus)

7 May 1961 Round of 16	AEK Athens	4–1	Proodeftiki	Nea Filadelfeia
16:30 EET (UTC+2)	Nestoridis 36', 42', 48', 64'		Daoutis 75'	Stadium: AEK Stadium; Attendance: 7,000; Referee: Antonis Choumerianos (Heraklion)
Note: When AEK made the 4–0, the goalkeeper of Proodeftiki, Anastasiadis hit his shoulder and an internal substitution took place with Vergidis going under the goalpost and Anastasiadis playing as an attacker.

7 June 1961 Quarter-finals	Iraklis	1–0	AEK Athens	Thessaloniki
17:00 EET (UTC+2)	Liaros 12', (penalty missed) 52'			Stadium: Kaftanzoglio Stadium; Attendance: 15,000; Referee: Viktor Schicker (Switzerland)

=== Balkans Cup ===
Pos	Team	Pld	W	D	L	GF	GA	GR	Pts	Qualification
1	(Romania) Steagul Roșu Brașov (C)	8	5	3	0	18	7	2.571	13	Winners
2	(Bulgaria) Levski Sofia	8	3	2	3	16	11	1.455	8	
3	(Albania) Partizani Tirana	8	3	2	3	8	6	1.333	8	
4	(Turkey) Fenerbahçe	8	2	4	2	9	11	0.818	8	
5	(Greece) AEK Athens	8	1	1	6	8	24	0.333	3	

Source: rsssf.com
Rules for classification: 1) points; 2) goal average; 3) number of goals scored
(C) Champions

==== Matches ====
15 February 1961 1	AEK Athens (Greece)	2–4	(Romania) Steagul Roșu Brașov	Athens, Greece
15:30 EET (UTC+2)	Nestoridis 24'; Petridis 81'		Năftănăilă 29'; Meszaros 36'; Szigeti 50'; Nagy 64' (pen.)	Stadium: AEK Stadium; Attendance: 25,000; Referee: Todor Gerov (Bulgaria)

29 March 1961 2	AEK Athens (Greece)	2–2	(Turkey) Fenerbahçe	Athens, Greece
16:00 EET (UTC+2)	Nestoridis 39' (pen.); Petridis 40'	Report	Aytaç 13'; Gündüz 61'; Küçükandonyadis (penalty missed) 63'	Stadium: AEK Stadium; Attendance: 18,500; Referee: Konstantin Dinov (Bulgaria)

26 April 1961 3	Fenerbahçe (Turkey)	5–1	(Greece) AEK Athens	Istanbul, Turkey
	Küçükandonyadis 3', 26'; Gündüz 17'; Bartu 20'; Has 41'	Report	Tsachouridis 49'	Stadium: BJK İnönü Stadium; Attendance: 20,000; Referee: Stelian Mataiser (Romania)

17 May 1961 4	AEK Athens (Greece)	3–1	(Bulgaria) Levski Sofia	Athens, Greece
17:00 EET (UTC+2)	Nestoridis 44', 66'; Gouvas 74'	Report	Sokolov 32'	Stadium: AEK Stadium; Attendance: 15,000; Referee: Cezmi Basar (Turkey)

5	Steagul Roșu Brașov (Romania)	2–0 (Awarded)	(Greece) AEK Athens	Brașov, Romania
				Stadium: Tineretului Stadium
Note: After Steagul Roșu Brașov won the trophy on 15 November 1961, AEK Athens withdrew from the tournament.

6	Levski Sofia (Bulgaria)	2–0 (Awarded)	(Greece) AEK Athens	Sofia, Bulgaria
				Stadium: Levski Stadium
Note: After Steagul Roșu Brașov won the trophy on 15 November 1961, AEK Athens withdrew from the tournament.

7	Partizani Tirana (Albania)	2–0 (Awarded)	(Greece) AEK Athens	Tirana, Albania
				Stadium: Dinamo Stadium
Note: After Steagul Roșu Brașov won the trophy on 15 November 1961, AEK Athens withdrew from the tournament.

8	AEK Athens (Greece)	0–2 (Awarded)	(Albania) Partizani Tirana	Athens, Greece
				Stadium: AEK Stadium
Note: After Steagul Roșu Brașov won the trophy on 15 November 1961, AEK Athens withdrew from the tournament.

== Statistics ==
=== Squad statistics ===
As of 25 June 1961

No.	Pos	Player	Alpha Ethniki		Greek Cup		Balkans Cup		Total	
No.	Pos	Player	Apps	Goals	Apps	Goals	Apps	Goals	Apps	Goals
Goalkeepers
—	GK	(Kingdom of Greece) Sotiris Fakis	21	0	4	0	2	0	27	0
—	GK	(Kingdom of Greece) Stelios Serafidis	8	0	3	0	3	0	14	0
—	GK	(Kingdom of Greece) Kimon Dimitriou	1	0	1	0	0	0	2	0
Defenders
—	DF	(Kingdom of Greece) Giannis Marditsis	21	0	5	0	4	0	30	0
—	DF	(Kingdom of Greece) Petros Stamatelopoulos	17	0	7	0	0	0	24	0
—	DF	(Kingdom of Greece) Nikos Melissis	0	0	3	0	0	0	3	0
—	DF	(Kingdom of Greece) Mimis Anastasiadis	14	1	4	0	4	0	22	1
—	DF	(Kingdom of Greece) Antonis Gavanas	5	0	2	0	0	0	7	0
—	DF	(Kingdom of Greece) Theofilos Vernezis	24	0	1	0	4	0	29	0
—	DF	(Kingdom of Greece) Dimitris Tzaneras	2	0	0	0	0	0	2	0
—	DF	(Kingdom of Greece) Dimitris Diakakis	12	0	4	0	0	0	16	0
Midfielders
—	MF	(Kingdom of Greece) Pavlos Emmanouilidis	0	0	3	2	0	0	3	2
—	MF	(Kingdom of Greece) Miltos Papapostolou	24	1	5	0	4	0	33	1
—	MF	(Kingdom of Greece) Giorgos Petridis	24	4	5	2	4	2	33	8
—	MF	(Kingdom of Greece) Stelios Skevofilakas	0	0	0	0	1	0	1	0
—	MF	(Kingdom of Greece) Thanasis Gouvas	26	7	3	0	3	1	32	8
—	MF	(Kingdom of Greece) Thymios Polyzos	18	1	6	0	3	0	27	1
—	MF	(Kingdom of Greece) Alekos Daispangos	0	0	1	0	0	0	1	0
Forwards
—	FW	(Kingdom of Greece) Kostas Nestoridis	28	27	5	13	4	4	37	44
—	FW	(Kingdom of Greece) Alekos Sofianidis	14	5	5	1	3	0	22	6
—	FW	(Kingdom of Greece) Andreas Stamatiadis	29	9	8	9	4	0	41	18
—	FW	(Kingdom of Greece) Dimitris Tsanoulas	1	0	2	0	1	0	4	0
—	FW	(Kingdom of Greece) Christos Ampos	22	7	3	2	1	0	26	9
—	FW	(Kingdom of Greece) Argyris Argyropoulos	1	0	0	0	0	0	1	0
—	FW	(Kingdom of Greece) Nikos Zagotsis	2	0	1	3	0	0	3	3
—	FW	(Kingdom of Greece) Aris Tsachouridis	6	1	3	3	3	1	12	5
—	FW	(Kingdom of Greece) Stefanos Demiris	9	2	4	3	1	0	14	5
—	FW	(Kingdom of Greece) Spyros Pomonis	1	0	0	0	0	0	1	0

=== Goalscorers ===
As of 25 June 1961
The list is sorted by competition order when total goals are equal, then by position and then alphabetically by surname.

Rank	Pos.	Player	Alpha Ethniki	Greek Cup	Balkans Cup	Total
1	FW	(Greece) Kostas Nestoridis	27	13	4	44
2	FW	(Greece) Andreas Stamatiadis	9	9	0	18
3	FW	(Greece) Christos Ampos	7	2	0	9
4	MF	(Greece) Thanasis Gouvas	7	0	1	8
4	MF	(Greece) Giorgos Petridis	4	2	2	8
6	FW	(Greece) Alekos Sofianidis	5	1	0	6
7	FW	(Greece) Stefanos Demiris	2	3	0	5
7	FW	(Greece) Aris Tsachouridis	1	3	1	5
9	FW	(Greece) Nikos Zagotsis	0	3	0	3
10	MF	(Greece) Pavlos Emmanouilidis	0	2	0	2
11	DF	(Greece) Mimis Anastasiadis	1	0	0	1
11	MF	(Greece) Miltos Papapostolou	1	0	0	1
11	MF	(Greece) Thymios Polyzos	1	0	0	1
Own goals			1	0	0	1
Totals			66	38	8	112

=== Hat-tricks ===
Numbers in superscript represent the goals that the player scored.

Player	Against	Result	Date	Competition	Source
(Greece) Kostas Nestoridis	(Greece) Panegialios	6–0 (H)	18 September 1960	Alpha Ethniki	
(Greece) Aris Tsachouridis	(Greece) AE Kesarianis	9–0 (H)	11 December 1960	Greek Cup	
(Greece) Kostas Nestoridis^{4}	(Greece) Agioi Anargyroi	5–1 (H)	12 January 1961	Greek Cup	
(Greece) Kostas Nestoridis	(Greece) Atromitos Piraeus	7–0 (H)	22 January 1961	Alpha Ethniki	
(Greece) Nikos Zagotsis	(Greece) Niki Plakas	8–1 (H)	15 March 1961	Greek Cup	
(Greece) Andreas Stamatiadis	(Greece) Niki Plakas	8–1 (H)	15 March 1961	Greek Cup	
(Greece) Kostas Nestoridis^{4}	(Greece) Prasina Poulia	7–3 (H)	2 April 1961	Greek Cup	
(Greece) Kostas Nestoridis	(Greece) Fostiras	4–2 (H)	23 April 1961	Alpha Ethniki	
(Greece) Kostas Nestoridis^{4}	(Greece) Proodeftiki	4–1 (H)	7 May 1961	Greek Cup	

=== Clean sheets ===
As of 25 June 1961
The list is sorted by competition order when total clean sheets are equal and then alphabetically by surname. Clean sheets in games where both goalkeepers participated are awarded to the goalkeeper who started the game. Goalkeepers with no appearances are not included.

Rank	Player	Alpha Ethniki	Greek Cup	Balkans Cup	Total
1	(Greece) Sotiris Fakis	9	0	0	9
2	(Greece) Stelios Serafidis	2	0	0	2
2	(Greece) Kimon Dimitriou	1	1	0	2
Totals		12	1	0	13

=== Disciplinary record ===
As of 25 June 1961

N	P	Nat.	Name	Alpha Ethniki			Greek Cup			Balkans Cup			Total			Notes
N	P	Nat.	Name	Yellow card	Second yellow card	Red card	Yellow card	Second yellow card	Red card	Yellow card	Second yellow card	Red card	Yellow card	Second yellow card	Red card	Notes
Goalkeepers
—	GK	(Kingdom of Greece)	Sotiris Fakis													
—	GK	(Kingdom of Greece)	Stelios Serafidis													
—	GK	(Kingdom of Greece)	Kimon Dimitriou													
Defenders
—	DF	(Kingdom of Greece)	Giannis Marditsis													
—	DF	(Kingdom of Greece)	Petros Stamatelopoulos													
—	DF	(Kingdom of Greece)	Nikos Melissis													
—	DF	(Kingdom of Greece)	Mimis Anastasiadis			1									1	
—	DF	(Kingdom of Greece)	Antonis Gavanas													
—	DF	(Kingdom of Greece)	Theofilos Vernezis													
—	DF	(Kingdom of Greece)	Dimitris Tzaneras													
—	DF	(Kingdom of Greece)	Dimitris Diakakis													
Midfielders
—	MF	(Kingdom of Greece)	Pavlos Emmanouilidis													
—	MF	(Kingdom of Greece)	Miltos Papapostolou													
—	MF	(Kingdom of Greece)	Giorgos Petridis													
—	MF	(Kingdom of Greece)	Stelios Skevofilakas													
—	MF	(Kingdom of Greece)	Thanasis Gouvas													
—	MF	(Kingdom of Greece)	Thymios Polyzos													
—	MF	(Kingdom of Greece)	Alekos Daispangos													
Forwards
—	FW	(Kingdom of Greece)	Kostas Nestoridis													
—	FW	(Kingdom of Greece)	Alekos Sofianidis													
—	FW	(Kingdom of Greece)	Andreas Stamatiadis													
—	FW	(Kingdom of Greece)	Dimitris Tsanoulas													
—	FW	(Kingdom of Greece)	Christos Ampos													
—	FW	(Kingdom of Greece)	Argyris Argyropoulos													
—	FW	(Kingdom of Greece)	Nikos Zagotsis													
—	FW	(Kingdom of Greece)	Aris Tsachouridis													
—	FW	(Kingdom of Greece)	Stefanos Demiris													
—	FW	(Kingdom of Greece)	Spyros Pomonis													

== Awards ==
Player	Pos.	Award	Source
(Greece) Kostas Nestoridis	FW	Alpha Ethniki Top Scorer	
(Greece) Kostas Nestoridis	FW	Greek Cup Top Scorer	
