= Nikos Alefantos =

Greek footballer (1939–2020)

Personal information
- Full name: Nikolaos Alefantos
- Date of birth: 3 January 1939
- Place of birth: Athens, Greece
- Date of death: 23 June 2020 (aged 81)
- Place of death: Athens, Greece
- Height: 1.83 m (6 ft 0 in)
- Position: Midfielder

Youth career
- 1949–1952: Asteras Exarchion

Senior career*
Years	Team	Apps	(Gls)
1952–1956	Rouf		
1956	Panathinaikos	1	
1956–1958	Chalandri		
1958–1959	Olympiacos	30	(0)
1959–1963	Atromitos Piraeus	22	(1)
1963–1964	Olympiacos Chalkida	25	(3)
1964–1967	Panegialios	54	(13)
1967–1968	Panelefsiniakos	6	(1)
1968–1969	Vyzas Megara	12	(0)

Managerial career
- 1969–1970: Asteras Exarchion
- 1970–1973: PAO Rouf
- 1973–1974: PAS Giannina
- 1974–1976: Pierikos
- 1976–1977: OFI
- 1978: Kastoria
- 1979: Pierikos
- 1979: PAS Giannina
- 1979–1980: Korinthos
- 1981: OFI
- 1983: Doxa Drama
- 1983–1984: Olympiacos
- 1984–1985: Panionios
- 1985: Greece military
- 1985–1986: Iraklis
- 1986–1987: AEK Athens
- 1987–1988: Iraklis
- 1989: PAOK
- 1989: Apollon Kalamarias
- 1989–1990: Doxa Drama
- 1990: Apollon Kalamarias
- 1990: AEL
- 1991: Ionikos
- 1991–1992: Ionikos
- 1993: Anorthosis
- 1993: Kalamata
- 1993: Skoda Xanthi
- 1994: Olympiacos
- 1995–1996: Panionios
- 1997: APOEL
- 1997–1998: Apollon Kalamarias
- 1998: ILTEX Lykoi
- 1998: Ethnikos Piraeus
- 1998–1999: Proodeftiki
- 1999–2000: Panachaiki
- 2000–2001: Panargiakos
- 2001–2002: Ethnikos Asteras
- 2002: Fostiras
- 2004: Olympiacos
- * Club domestic league appearances and goals

Nikos Alefantos (Greek: Νίκος Αλέφαντος, 3 January 1939 – 23 June 2020) was a Greek professional footballer and football coach. He is regarded as one of the most innovative football managers of the 20th century, known in Greece for his phlegmatic personality, short temper and famous quips. He is often regarded as the greatest Greek manager never to have won one of the two major domestic titles (Alpha Ethniki and Greek Cup). In his 35-year managerial career he managed 28 different teams, most notably Olympiacos (1983–84, 1994, 2004) and Iraklis, whom he guided from the relegation zone to a 4th-place finish in 1985–86, after what was dubbed the "Play-off of Shame" in Greece.

Raised in Athens during the Second World War, Alefantos' talent led him to embark on a football career aged just 13 at Rouf, beginning as a midfielder. He was a key member of Olympiacos' Double winning 1958–59 season aged just 20 years of age. Afterwards, he'd help Atromitos Piraeus to its singular promotion to the newly created First Division in 1960 before shifting to an attacker in his later years after leaving Atromitos, most prominently at Panegialios, before retiring with Vyzas Megaron aged 30 to pursue a managerial career. He never featured for the Greek national football team, but had played in the national youth team in 1959.

Alefantos became a prominent manager on the Greek football stage in the 1970s, achieving promotions to the Alpha Ethniki with PAS Giannina and Pierikos, quickly gaining a reputation for his idiosyncratic character and tactical innovations – inspired by his future mentor Ernst Happel – and having various spells in the top division before taking charge of former club Olympiacos in 1983. His relationships with club executives and fans were often strained; he had notoriously frequent short spells, including at Kastoria, Kalamata and Fostiras, where he was fired before completing more than one official match. His stint at AEK Athens in 1987 also ended in acrimony after falling out with star player Thomas Mavros and assaulting a journalist after his sacking.

Despite attaining only the Cypriot Cup with APOEL in 1997, Alefantos had successful spells at Olympiacos, Panionios, Iraklis and Ionikos, achieving promotion with the latter, becoming a cult figure and gaining admirers and critics for his uncompromising attitude, which led him being imprisoned twice, in 1979 and 1987, the latter following his AEK Athens tenure. His teams suffered no relegation with him in charge, earning reputation as a relegation specialist. At his final managerial role at Olympiacos in 2004, his team controversially failed to stop rivals Panathinaikos from completing a domestic double, which invoked a feud between him and referee Giorgos Douros, ending Alefantos' career.

Outside of football, he became a prominent TV host in the final two decades of his life and died in 2020 aged 81, prompting an outpouring of grief across Greece's football scene. He was buried in the First Cemetery of Athens. Some of Alefantos' quotes have entered popular culture in Greece, which he acknowledged in his 2013 autobiography Τα Πάντα Όλα ("All and everything").

== Career ==
After playing football in the streets in the years of WWII and the Greek Civil War, his talent was spotted by Asteras Exarchion, the club from which he would later start his long and memorable managerial career. He would sign for P.A.O. Rouf at age 13 and embarked on a 16–year footballing career which included being one of roughly 30 players who have appeared for both eternal enemies, Panathinaikos and Olympiacos. At the latter, the club he supported for all his life, he played a vital role in the club's Double in the 1958–59 season. After noteworthy spells at other clubs, he retired in 1969 aged 30 and immediately embarked on a lengthy career in managemenent.

Alefantos managed several clubs in the Alpha Ethniki, including Olympiacos during 2004. He also had brief spells leading AEL in 1975 and 1990.

Alefantos gained notoriety for his unusually short tenure as the manager of Fostiras in 2002. He was appointed manager of the club, replacing Vlachos in September 2002. One of Fostira's players, Dimitrios Moutas, immediately refused to train with Alefantos, and then Alefantos resigned later that day after failed contract negotiations. Eventually Alefantos appeared in ART channel of Greece, participating in a sport TV program called "Dokari Kai mesa" presented by Giannis Karatzaferis.

He died from a heart attack on 23 June 2020, aged 81.

== Managerial statistics ==
Team	From	To	Record				
Team	From	To	G	W	D	L	Win %
Asteras Exarchion	28 July 1969	6 June 1970	40	21	9	10	52.50
P.A.O. Rouf	6 June 1970	8 June 1973	114	51	38	25	44.74
PAS Giannina	29 July 1973	24 March 1974	28	20	6	2	71.43
Pierikos	4 July 1974	30 June 1976	72	32	22	18	44.44
OFI	8 August 1976	18 November 1977	45	18	9	18	40.00
Kastoria	14 Μarch 1978	27 March 1978	1	0	0	1	0.00
Pierikos (Note: Matches during Alefantos' second tenure at Pierikos are counted by pitch performances and not by the court ruling which relegated Pierikos in the 1978–79 season.)	2 January 1979	26 June 1979	22	16	3	3	72.73
PAS Giannina (Note: Includes matches played during Alefantos' 25 day prison sentence in October 1979.)	5 July 1979	4 December 1979	10	4	4	2	40.00
Korinthos	8 December 1979	30 June 1980	26	11	5	10	42.31
OFI	1 July 1981	26 October 1981	6	2	0	4	33.33
Doxa Drama	3 February 1983	30 June 1983	21	8	3	10	38.10
Olympiacos	30 November 1983	12 March 1984	14	9	2	3	64.29
Panionios	7 May 1984	5 April 1985	28	11	10	7	39.29
Iraklis	8 October 1985	30 June 1986	31	17	6	8	54.84
AEK Athens	30 December 1986	7 May 1987	14	6	4	4	42.86
Iraklis	7 October 1987	7 January 1988	10	4	2	4	40.00
PAOK	29 January 1989	9 April 1989	13	4	5	4	30.77
Apollon Kalamarias	22 June 1989	4 July 1989	4	3	0	1	75.00
Doxa Drama	5 July 1989	22 January 1990	20	5	7	8	25.00
Apollon Kalamarias	26 March 1990	23 April 1990	3	0	2	1	0.00
AEL	25 October 1990	4 December 1990	4	0	0	4	0.00
Ionikos	18 April 1991	7 May 1991	3	0	2	1	0.00
Ionikos	1 July 1991	28 September 1992	47	22	17	8	46.81
Kalamata	1 July 1993	25 July 1993	0	0	0	0	—
Skoda Xanthi	6 December 1993	19 December 1993	3	2	0	1	66.67
Olympiacos	27 January 1994	16 September 1994	19	11	5	3	57.89
Panionios	27 November 1995	29 January 1996	7	2	1	4	28.57
APOEL	28 February 1997	31 May 1997	14	5	2	7	35.71
ILTEX Lykoi	2 February 1998	23 February 1998	3	1	1	1	33.33
Ethnikos Piraeus	25 March 1998	4 May 1998	4	0	2	2	0.00
Proodeftiki	26 November 1998	27 September 1999	30	12	7	11	40.00
Panachaiki	1 January 2000	14 February 2000	6	1	2	3	16.67
Ethnikos Asteras	1 July 2001	4 February 2002	23	9	5	9	39.13
Fostiras	11 September 2002	11 September 2002	0	0	0	0	—
Olympiacos (caretaker)	19 March 2004	15 June 2004	10	7	2	1	70.00
Total			706	323	181	202	45.75

=== Olympiacos managerial statistics ===
Club	From	To	Competition	Record				
Club	From	To	Competition	P	W	D	L	Win %
Olympiacos (first tenure)	30 November 1983	12 March 1984	Alpha Ethniki	12	7	2	3	58.33
Olympiacos (first tenure)	30 November 1983	12 March 1984	European Cup	0	0	0	0	—
Olympiacos (first tenure)	30 November 1983	12 March 1984	Greek Football Cup	2	2	0	0	100.00
Olympiacos total (first tenure)				14	9	2	3	64.29
Olympiacos (second tenure)	27 January 1994	16 September 1994	Alpha Ethniki	15	9	5	1	60.00
Olympiacos (second tenure)	27 January 1994	16 September 1994	Greek Football Cup	3	2	0	1	66.67
Olympiacos (second tenure)	27 January 1994	16 September 1994	European Cup	0	0	0	0	—
Olympiacos (second tenure)	27 January 1994	16 September 1994	UEFA Cup	1	0	0	1	0.00
Olympiacos (second tenure)	27 January 1994	16 September 1994	European Cup Winners' Cup	0	0	0	0	—
Olympiacos total (second tenure)				19	11	5	3	57.89
Olympiacos (third tenure, caretaker)	19 March 2004	15 June 2004	Alpha Ethniki	7	6	1	0	85.71
Olympiacos (third tenure, caretaker)	19 March 2004	15 June 2004	Greek Football Cup	3	1	1	1	33.33
Olympiacos (third tenure, caretaker)	19 March 2004	15 June 2004	UEFA Champions League	0	0	0	0	—
Olympiacos (caretaker) total (third tenure)				10	7	2	1	70.00
Totals				43	27	9	7	62.79

== Honours ==
=== As a player ===
Olympiacos

- Panhellenic Championship: 1958–59
- Greek Cup: 1958–59

=== As a coach ===
APOEL

- Cypriot Cup: 1996–97

PAS Giannina

- Beta Ethniki: 1973–74 (Group 1)

Pierikos

- Beta Ethniki: 1974–75 (Group 3)
