= 1960–61 Alpha Ethniki =

25th season of top-tier football league in Greece

Alpha Ethniki
- Season: 1960–61
- Champions: Panathinaikos; 5th Greek title
- Relegated: Panegialios; Thermaikos; Atromitos Piraeus
- European Cup: Panathinaikos
- Cup Winners' Cup: Olympiacos
- Inter-Cities Fairs Cup: Iraklis
- Matches: 240
- Goals: 676 (2.82 per match)
- Top goalscorer: Kostas Nestoridis (27 goals)
- Biggest home win: AEK Athens 7–0 Atromitos; Panathinaikos 8–1 Proodeftiki
- Biggest away win: Atromitos 0–4 AEK Athens; Atromitos 0–4 Ethnikos Piraeus; Proodeftiki 0–4 Panathinaikos; Fostiras 1–5 Panathinaikos; Panegialios 2–6 Fostiras
- Highest scoring: Doxa Drama 6–4 Atromitos

The 1960–61 Alpha Ethniki was the 25th season of the highest football league of Greece. The season began on 17 September 1960 and ended on 2 July 1961 with the play-off match. Panathinaikos won their second consecutive and fifth Greek title.

The point system was: Win: 3 points - Draw: 2 points - Loss: 1 point.

== Teams ==
Promoted from 1960 Beta Ethniki	Relegated from 1959–60 Alpha Ethniki
Atromitos Piraeus; Fostiras; Thermaikos	Pankorinthiakos; Megas Alexandros Katerinis; AE Nikaia

Location of teams in 1960–61 Alpha Ethniki

== League table ==
Pos	Team	Pld	W	D	L	GF	GA	GD	Pts	Qualification or relegation
1	Panathinaikos (C)	30	23	4	3	71	23	+48	80	Qualification for European Cup preliminary round
2	Olympiacos	30	19	5	6	62	23	+39	73	Qualification for Cup Winners' Cup first round
3	Panionios	30	17	6	7	55	37	+18	70	
4	AEK Athens (Note: AEK Athens and Atromitos Piraeus were deducted 1 points each.)	30	17	6	7	64	32	+32	69	
5	Apollon Athens	30	10	13	7	56	41	+15	63	
6	Ethnikos Piraeus	30	11	10	9	33	29	+4	62 (Note: 6th place play-off: Ethnikos Piraeus–Doxa Drama 2–1.)	
7	Doxa Drama	30	12	8	10	48	50	−2	62	
8	Iraklis	30	12	7	11	35	31	+4	61	Invitation for Inter-Cities Fairs Cup first round
9	Fostiras	30	12	6	12	44	48	−4	60	
10	PAOK	30	7	15	8	31	33	−2	59	
11	Proodeftiki	30	9	9	12	37	49	−12	57 (Note: 11th place play-off: Proodeftiki–Aris 2–0.)	
12	Aris	30	10	7	13	30	41	−11	57	
13	Apollon Kalamarias	30	8	8	14	31	38	−7	54	
14	Panegialios (R)	30	5	7	18	26	60	−34	47	Relegation to FCA Winners' Championship
15	Thermaikos (R)	30	3	8	19	33	75	−42	44	Relegation to FCA Winners' Championship
16	Atromitos Piraeus (R)	30	2	7	21	19	65	−46	40	Relegation to FCA Winners' Championship

Source: RSSSF
Rules for classification: 1st points; 2nd decision match; 3rd head-to-head goal difference.
(C) Champions; (R) Relegated

== Results ==
Home \ Away	AEK	APA	APK	ARIS	ATR	DOX	ETH	FOS	IRA	OLY	PAO	PNG	PAN	PAOK	PRO	THE
AEK Athens		1–0	1–0	0–0	7–0	0–0	4–2	4–2	1–0	4–1	2–1	6–0	1–2	3–0	1–1	3–1
Apollon Athens	2–4		3–1	3–0	3–0	7–1	0–0	2–2	2–1	0–1	1–3	5–1	1–0	2–0	2–2	6–2
Apollon Kalamarias	0–3	4–2		0–0	0–0	1–2	0–1	1–0	1–0	0–2	1–2	0–0	0–1	1–1	0–0	4–0
Aris	3–1	2–1	1–2		2–0	3–0	0–1	2–1	0–1	0–0	0–3	2–1	2–5	1–1	2–0	2–1
Atromitos Piraeus	0–4	0–0	0–1	0–1		1–2	0–4	0–1	1–1	1–3	0–2 (Note: Atromitos Piraeus-Panathinaikos 0-1, replayed 0-2.)	3–0	1–1	1–1	0–2	3–1
Doxa Drama	1–0	3–0	1–2	2–1	6–4		1–1	6–2	1–1	1–0	0–1	1–1	2–2	2–0	3–1	2–2
Ethnikos Piraeus	1–1	0–0	2–0	1–1	0–0	2–1		1–1	2–1	1–0	0–1	2–0	4–1	0–1	0–3	1–1
Fostiras	0–1	2–2	3–2	4–0	3–1	2–0	1–0		2–0	1–0	1–5	1–0	1–2	0–0	1–0	3–0
Iraklis	0–2	2–2	2–0	0–2	4–0	1–2	2–1	0–0		2–1	1–0	1–0	1–0	1–1	2–0	2–1
Olympiacos	3–1	1–1	1–0	3–1	3–0	3–0	2–0	7–1	2–1		1–0	2–0	5–1	1–1	3–0	5–1
Panathinaikos	2–0 (Note: Panathinaikos-AEK Athens 3-2, forfeit 2-0.)	1–1	2–0	1–0	5–1	2–0	0–0	5–2	1–0	1–0		4–1	4–2	2–0	8–1	4–2
Panegialios	1–1	2–2	1–1	1–0	1–0	3–1	1–3	2–6	1–3	1–4	1–3		0–1	2–2	1–0	2–3
Panionios	2–1	1–2	2–2	3–0	2–0	3–2	4–1	0–0	2–1	0–0	3–3	1–0		1–2	1–0	4–0
PAOK	1–1	1–1	2–2	3–0	2–0	0–0	0–0	2–0	1–1	0–2	0–1	0–0	1–2		1–3	1–0
Proodeftiki	4–2 (Note: Proodeftiki-AEK Athens 1-1, replayed 4-2.)	2–2	2–1	1–1	1–0	2–3	1–2	2–1	1–1	1–1	1–3	1–0	0–4	2–2		2–0
Thermaikos	2–4	1–1	1–4	1–1	2–2	2–2	1–0	1–0	1–2	2–5	1–1	1–2	0–2	1–4	1–1	

Source: RSSSF
Legend: Blue = home team win; Yellow = draw; Red = away team win.

== Top scorers ==
Rank	Player	Club	Goals
1	(Greece) Kostas Nestoridis	AEK Athens	27
2	(Greece) Andreas Papaemmanouil	Panathinaikos	23
3	(Greece) Mimis Benardos	Panathinaikos	19
4	(Greece) Giorgos Deimezis	Fostiras	18
5	(Greece) Pavlos Grigoriadis	Doxa Drama	17
6	(Greece) Thanasis Saravakos	Panionios	14
6	(Greece) Giorgos Sideris	Olympiacos	14
8	(Greece) Aris Papazoglou	Olympiacos	13
9	(Greece) Christos Georgalas	Fostiras	12
9	(Greece) Plastiras Xylas	Thermaikos	12
11	(Greece) Dimitris Skordas	Apollon Athens	11

== Attendances ==
Panathinaikos drew the highest average home attendance in the 1960–61 Alpha Ethniki.

#	Team	Average attendance
1	Panathinaikos	15,998
2	Olympiacos	14,547
3	AEK Athens	11,928
4	Ethnikos Piraeus	5,867
5	Proodeftiki	5,853
6	Panionios	4,437
7	PAOK	4,394
8	Apollon Athens	3,859
9	Iraklis	3,810
10	Doxa Drama	3,804
11	Aris	3,699
12	Fostiras	3,551
13	Atromitos	3,547
14	Apollon Kalamarias	2,959
15	Panegialios	2,015
16	Thermaikos	902
