= S.F.K. Pierikos =

- Full name: Σύνδεσμος Φιλάθλων Κατερίνης Πιερικός (Supporters' Association of Katerini Pierikos)
- Nicknames: Ο Άρχοντας του Βορρά (The Lord of the North)
- Founded: 1927; 99 years ago, as Megas Alexandros Katerini; 11 April 1961; 64 years ago, as Pierikos
- Colours: White
- Anthem: Hymn of Pierikos
- Chairman: vacant

Syndesmos Filathlon Katerinis Pierikos (Greek: Σύνδεσμος Φιλάθλων Κατερίνης Πιερικός, Supporters' Association of Katerini Pierikos), founded in 1961, is a Greek multi-sport club and parent club of Pierikos, based in the town of Katerini, capital of Pieria regional unit, located in Central Macedonia, Greece. The club is also known as S.F.K. Pierikos, or simply Pierikos, and its colours are white.

== The foundation ==
SFK Piericos was founded on April 11, 1961 after the merging of Alexander the Great Katerini's F.C. and Olympus Katerini's F.C. and within the same year, Katerini's new team managed to gain promotion to the First National League.

In 1959 there were two popular clubs in Katerini, Alexander the Great F.C. and Olympus F.C.. There were big rivalries, bickering and many fights between the two clubs fans. That year began the first National League Championship and among the 16 teams in the premiere of the institution Alexander the Great F.C., without chance the first year, relegated. Katerini's second division team, Olympus F.C., claims to be trying to emulate its compatriot team but didn't made it and lost the ticket to its first trip to Thermaikos F.C. on the thread. The demise of Alexander the Great and the failure of promotion of Olympus lead the "calm" thinkers to a revolutionary thought at that time, the Unification. And this thought is considered revolutionary because between the two clubs there was a lame football hatred.

=== The merger ===
The new situation with the creation of the First National Division, changed the flow of things. There was no room for selfishness and similar emotions. The creation of a representative strong football club made out of the wonderful material of both teams it was the demand of the times. Thoughts of the merger have begun to mature as other federations in the provinces have followed suit because of financial and other problems. Of course there were reactions. The tough ones were scarce. Creating a powerful team that will represent Pieria is gaining ground.

The decision for the joint meeting of the representatives of the two clubs is taken by the Prefect of Pieria, Konstantinos Nalbantis and the Mayor of Katerini, Vassilios Tavantzis. The first meeting was held in the Prefecture on Saturday, March 18, 1961, with the chairman and rapporteur of the subject, the Prefect, who stated to the representatives of Olympus and Alexander the Great:

"From our own experience and also from the fans' disposal, regardless of their club placement, that with the current situation and the way the Football Championship is being carried out, a dynamic football organization must be created in our city, which will be morally and materially enhanced by the whole population of our city."

There really was a mood for union. The decisions on the issue of the General Meetings of the two clubs were decided on Tuesday, April 11, 1961. The next move was the meetings of the two clubs for decisions. Alexander the Great's F.C. General Meeting took place at the "Agrotikon" cafe on I. Dragoumi Street and Olympus F.C. General Meeting at the "Paradise" café at Successor's Konstantine Street. The General Meeting of Alexander the Great was held with 90 members present, unanimously voting in favor of the merger, after an hour-long process. On the contrary, the General Meeting of Olympus has been quite noisy, with reactions, leavings, dissensions and departures. The vote was 70 in favor of the merger, 6 against and 20 withdrew. But, nevertheless, the merger is now a fact! A little earlier, on May 29, 1961, Pierikos F.C. gave their first friendly game, in which Panathinaikos scored 3-0 with two goals by Fulidis and one by Bikas. The first signs are positive ... On June 4 of the same year, the statute is signed.

=== The name ===
The details of the arrangement followed. The two clubs would complete the 1961-62 championship and in June, after the draw, would temporarily remain one of the two clubs, to which they would formally accede the latter and would change their statutes and branding later. Its name: SUPPORTERS' ASSOCIATION OF KATERINI "PIERIKOS", its logo the regenerated from its ashes Phoenix. There were three names on the table; KATERINI F.C.- PAMPIERIKOS F.C.- PIERIKOS F.C., finally Pierikos F.C. prevailed. The draw led to the formal transcription of Alexander the Great F.C., whose statutes were changed and also changed its name, while Olympus F.C. was retained as a youth team, which in turn was renamed Apollo Katerini F.C. later.

=== Crest and colors ===
The team's crest was decided to be the resurrected Phoenix who symbolized the rebirth of the team after the merger as a new football force and a fresh start in Katerini football events. The shirt emblem it was difficult for the seamstress of the time to embroider on the jersey the regenerated Phoenix by its ash, instead of that, it was preferred to sew a circular Π, which was established in the consciousness of all Greek sportsmen as a mark and logo of the Pierikos F.C. emblem, inspired by the military units of ancient times that every military unit had its own logo, a design that the soldiers designed on their shield. And it was neither quickie work nor modernity of the time. It existed for millennia before Pierikos. With this Π in the jersey, the team has excelled in its best decade. Historically, the first jerseys had a black circle and a white Π, later the circle became white with a black perimeter and a black Π where it became classical. Some year there was only a black Π without a circle. Later the classic came back again. According to its statutes, Pierikos' colours were white. There was no mention of a second colour, but there had to be a second different colour to distinguish the numbers on the jerseys, so black was used as the second auxiliary colour. The colour selection was not random. It had been decided that the colour would be out of the "cliché" colours of the "football establishment" at that times (old times P.O.K.) with the vertical stripes (red-white, or green-white, or yellow-white). It was chosen with "non-established" templates, not Greek... No colour was chosen, but lack of colour. Inspired by the Real of the five consecutive Champions League Cups at the time in Europe. Throughout the '60s, Pierikos was always wearing full-white jerseys while in home meetings where the opponent played in white jerseys. Pierikos played in other colours as the regulation stated that the guest had the right to choose first and the host must wear different colours from the guest.

=== The Qualification to the First National League ===
Pierikos faced in a qualification match Olympiakos Kozani's F.C. in a 1961-62 second-leg brawl due to a tiebreaker on April 1, 1962 at the Kleanthis Vikelidis Stadium (named Aris Stadium at that time) on Sunday at 10.30am for the promotion to the newly established First National League. 18,000 fans arrived at the Thessaloniki's Stadium (and 10,000 off the pitch), the majority were Pierians. A campaign to Thessaloniki that Katerini did not know alike, since almost whole Katerini and whole Kozani fans went to watch the match, using every means of transportation available (buses, trucks, taxis, cars) while O.S.E. added extra wagons to transport the fans at that day.

This match was very tough, almost like a final, as whoever won would be promoted to the First National League and the loser would remain in the Second National League. There were so many hard fouls and tackles on both sides that Pierikos was left with 10 players and Olympiakos Kozani's with 9 cause of red cards. Three players dismissals in total, two for Olympiakos, one for Pierikos. In the 52', Olympiakos' player Sanopoulos was eliminated, while in the 57' Pierikos' player Taxidis and Olympiakos' Tsakiridis, they saw the red card from the Portuguese referee Guinea. The winning goal came from Kefalides in the 89' with a powerful shot from outside the penalty box. Kefalidis as a fast player took the ball in his possession from the back, passed 5-6 Olympiakos' players and when he reached the opponent's penalty box shot and scored. The festivities on the stands were frantic. The sporty Pieria sees the dream come true. There is only one step left for the qualification ... the game versus Hercules Kavala's F.C.

Pierikos again leads on July 4, 1962 in a Baraz match with Hercules Kavala's, where he was leveled after failing to beat him, drawing a 0-0 draw, in the last match in Katerini. The match took place on the Aris stadium with 12,000 spectators. A 1-0 lead for Pierikos came in the 57' from Bikas who opened the scoring with a long shot. The final 2-0 at 87' was scored by Anastasiadis sealing victory and success. The dream came true. Pierikos F.C. in the First National League! A real accomplishment since Pierikos was the first City of Greece that climb to the First National League in the first year of the newly established First National League.

The glory that followed in the 1960s shook the waters of Greek football and Katerini did not long to become the "football mom" of the country. Pierikos in front, and entire Katerini follows, Katerini who loved this sport so much, raised it high, "worshiped it as a religion". The dream, the hope and the desire for distinction, has unite all the Katerinians who, in the name of this sport, raised the white and black emblem and made it known throughout Greece and not only.

== Pierikos departments – History and honours ==
=== Pierikos Football ===
Created in 1961 and from 1962 to 1972, Katerini's team competed uninterruptedly in the First National League. In 1963 Pierikos competed in the Greek Cup final where he was defeated by Olympiacos 3-0. During the 1964–65 season Pierikos had the most distinction in its history so far, when it was ranked 5th in the First National Championship. In 1968-69 he repeated his success and again won 5th place and played in the 1969 Balkans Cup with Bulgaria's Beroe Stara Zagora and Turkey's PTT Ankara. On the big team of that time following players where participated: Drandakis, Kefalidis, Taxidis, Portokalidis, Mystakides, Sidiropoulos, Kyziroglou, Christoforidis, Orphanides, Foulidis, Amanatidis, Theodoridis.

During the period 1975–1978, Pierikos again competed at the First National Championship. He was re-found at the FNC in the 1984–85 season by converting to a professional club (and renamed Σ.Φ.Κ. Πιερικός ΠΑΕ) and also in the years 1991-92 and 1992–93. In 2007 the club finished first and climbed from the 3rd National to the 2nd National where competed until 2015, while in the same year was relegated to the 3rd National due to debts, where the club still competes now days.

=== Pierikos Basketball ===
Pierikos Basketball Club was the basketball section of S.F.K. Pierikos. The sport was added in 1969, following the club policy to expand. At the time of the section's merged in 2008, it was the second most successful section of S.F.K. Pierikos next after the football team.

From 1969 to 2008 the men's basketball division of Pierikos was in competition. In 1982–83 it competed in the First National. Argyris Papapetrou was the most important basketball player to play for Pierikos Basketball.

The basketball division ceased to exist in the summer of 2008 when GAS Archelaos Katerinis and SFK Pierikos B.C. merged their basketball divisions to strengthen their presence in the national men's basketball championships. The new club is currently competing in the A2 Division under the name S.F.K. Pierikos - Archelaus and is completely independent of the founding club.

=== Pierikos Basketball Women's ===
Pierikos B.C. (women's) was the women's basketball section of S.F.K. Pierikos. Since 1969 till 2008 the women's basketball division of Pierikos was in competition.

Along the Men's Basketball team the women's basketball division ceased to exist also in the summer of 2008 when GAS Archelaos Katerinis and SFK Pierikos B.C. merged their basketball divisions to strengthen their presence in the national women's basketball championships. The new club is currently competing in local championships under the name S.F.K. Pierikos - Archelaus and is completely independent of the founding club.

== Administrative Council ==
As of November 14, 2020

On June 19, 2019 SFK Pierikos proceeded to an early General Meeting in order to elect and appoint a new Board.

On June 20, 2019 the newly elected form proceeded to a new meeting in order to form the new board of directors which is as follows:

Composition of current Board
President	Antonios Kirgiakos
Vicepresident	Ilias Tsoukalas
General Board Secretary	Panagiotis Asteriou
Deputy Board Secretary	Dimitrios Morfakidis
Treasury Manager	Makis Theoharis
General Team's Chief	Makis Theoharis
Heads of Academies	Christina Daskalopoulou; Haralambpos Peidis; Ioannis Lazaridis
Football Supervisor	
Press Office Managers	Vassilis Tsakiridis; Konstantinos Panagitsas
General Material Supervisor	Michael Vassiliadis
Volleyball Division Supervisor	Aikaterini Panagiotidou
Legal Advisor	Konstantinos Karafoulidis
Technical Manager	Athanasios kotsiopoulos
Security manager	Georios Hajikostas

== Sport facilities ==
The football team plays at the Municipal Stadium of Katerini, Pierikos' home since 1961. The club uses also Municipal training facilities in the area of the National Stadium District. The facilities cover over 20,000 square meters.
