= 1961–62 Greek Football Cup =

1961–62 Greek Cup
Tournament details
- Country: Greece

Final positions
- Champions: None

Tournament statistics
- Top goal scorer(s): Giorgos Sideris (7 goals)

The 1961–62 Greek Football Cup was the 20th edition the Greek Football Cup.

== Tournament details ==
The competition began normally, but however was not completed: although the final (between Olympiacos and Panathinaikos) was held, it was abandoned in extra time, and it was determined no Cup would be awarded that year.

In the round of 32, the teams that had qualified to round of 16 of previous season qualified without matches. By Alpha Ethniki teams of that year, 6 teams were entered in qualifying matches. They were PAOK, Ethnikos Piraeus, Egaleo, Niki Volos, Panelefsiniakos and Fostiras. The last two did not qualify for the round of 32, after they were eliminated by Ethnikos and Egaleo, respectively.

In the round of 32, the teams of Central and Southern Greece were drawn against each other, as were the teams of Northern Greece, with the exception of the tie between Atromitos and Olympiacos Kozani. From the round of 16 onwards, there was a draw between teams that had qualified. In two cases the winners were determined by draw, after both matches ended in a draw after extra time. Olympiacos won by 9–0 against a subpar OFI.

Finalists that year were the eternal enemies, Olympiacos and Panathinaikos. The match was played at the AEK Stadium. It was an eventful and very hard match that was marked by three red cards in a first half, which in fact lasted 66 minutes because of continuous interruptions due to crowd behaviour. The intermission lasted 30 minutes, and spectators became suspicious that both teams had arranged for a draw in order to make more money from the replay (there being no penalty shootouts at the time), hurled objects on to the pitch.

The second half went more smoothly despite the reactions of disgruntled spectators unhappy with proceedings. The scores remained tied and the match went to extra time. However, with the 21 minutes of delays at the beginning of the match, darkness set in (there were no floodlights in the stadium), so the Swiss referee abandoned the game.

The HFF, fearful of reactions, declined to arrange a replay, so while there was a Cup final, there was no Cup winner. Olympiacos qualified for the European Cup Winners' Cup of next season, since Panathinaikos were the champions of that year, and therefore entered the European Cup competition.

== Calendar ==
From Round of 32 onwards:

Round	Date(s)	Fixtures	Clubs	New entries
Round of 32	10, 26 April 1962	16	32 → 16	16
Round of 16	8, 10, 16, 17 May 1962	10	16 → 8	none
Quarter-finals	1962	4	8 → 4	none
Semi-finals	1962	3	4 → 2	none
Final	27 June 1962	1	2	none

== Knockout phase ==
In the knockout phase, teams play against each other over a single match. If the match ends up as a draw, extra time will be played and if the match remains a draw a replay match is set at the home of the guest team which the extra time rule stands as well. If a winner doesn't occur after the replay match the winner emerges by a flip of a coin, except from the final.
The mechanism of the draws for each round is as follows:

- In the draw for the round of 32, the teams that had qualified to previous' season round of 16 are seeded and the clubs that passed the qualification round are unseeded.
  The teams of Central and Southern Greece were drawn against each other, as were the teams of Northern Greece, with the exception of one match.
- In the draws for the round of 16 onwards, there are no seedings, and teams from the same group can be drawn against each other.

== Bracket ==
Round of 32
Panathinaikos	2
Egaleo	0
Averof Ioannina	3
Proodeftiki	0
Panelefsiniakos	0
Pankorinthiakos	1
Iraklis Kavala	1	1
Apollon Kalamarias	1	3
Ethnikos Piraeus	5
Kalogreza	1
Doxa Drama	1	1
Pierikos	1	3
AEK Athens (w/o)	2
Kalamata	0
Apollon Athens	4
Ergotelis	0
Olympiacos	7
Olympiacos Chalkida	1
Rodiakos	0
OFI (w/o)	2
PAOK	1
Makedonikos Kozani	0
Olympos Katerini	0
Aris	1
Niki Volos	2
Ilisiakos	0
Lilas	1
Panionios	6
Olympiacos Kozani	3
Atromitos	1
Iraklis	5
Apollon Serres	1

Round of 16
Panathinaikos	3
Averof Ioannina	0
Pankorinthiakos	0
Apollon Kalamarias	1
Ethnikos Piraeus	0
Pierikos	1
AEK Athens	1
Apollon Athens	2
Olympiacos	9
OFI	0
PAOK	1	1
Aris	1	1
Niki Volos	2
Panionios	5
Olympiacos Kozani	1	2
Iraklis	1	2

Quarter-finals
Panathinaikos	6
Apollon Kalamarias	1
Pierikos	1
Apollon Athens (a.e.t.)	4
Olympiacos	3
Aris	2
Panionios (a.e.t.)	2
Olympiacos Kozani	1

Semi-finals
Panathinaikos	5
Apollon Athens	3
Olympiacos	1	3
Panionios	1	2

Final
Panathinaikos	0
Olympiacos	0

== Round of 32 ==
Team 1	Score/Agg.	Team 2	Match	Replay
Panathinaikos	2–0	Egaleo		
Ethnikos Piraeus	5–1	Kalogreza		
Apollon Athens	4–0	Ergotelis		
Olympiacos	7–1	Olympiacos Chalkida		
Chalkida	1–6	Panionios		
AEK Athens	2–0 (w/o)	Kalamata		
Panelefsiniakos	0–1	Pankorinthiakos		
Rodiakos	0–2 (w/o)	OFI		
Niki Volos	2–0	Ilisiakos		
Averof Ioannina	3–0	Proodeftiki		
Olympiacos Kozani	3–1	Atromitos		
Olympos Katerini	0–1	Aris		
Doxa Drama	2–4	Pierikos	1–1 (a.e.t.)	1–3
PAOK	1–0	Makedonikos Kozani		
Iraklis Kavala	2–4	Apollon Kalamarias	1–1 (a.e.t.)	1–3
Iraklis	5–1	Apollon Serres		

== Round of 16 ==
Team 1	Score/Agg.	Team 2	Match	Replay
Pankorinthiakos	0–1	Apollon Kalamarias		
Niki Volos	2–5	Panionios		
PAOK	2–2	Aris^{*}	1–1 (a.e.t.)	1–1 (a.e.t.)
Panathinaikos	3–0	Averof Ioannina		
Olympiacos Kozani^{*}	3–3	Iraklis	1–1 (a.e.t.)	2–2 (a.e.t.)
Olympiacos	9–0	OFI		
Ethnikos Piraeus	0–1	Pierikos		
AEK Athens	1–2	Apollon Athens		

^{*}Qualified after draw.

== Quarter-finals ==
Team 1	Score	Team 2
Panathinaikos	6–1	Apollon Kalamarias
Olympiacos	3–2	Aris
Panionios	2–1 (a.e.t.)	Olympiacos Kozani
Pierikos	1–4 (a.e.t.)	Apollon Athens

== Semi-finals ==
Team 1	Score/Agg.	Team 2	Match	Replay
Panathinaikos	5–3	Apollon Athens		
Olympiacos	4–3	Panionios	1–1 (a.e.t.)	3–2

== Final ==
27 June 1962
17:00 EET

Olympiacos	0–0 (Abandoned at the 97th minute) (a.e.t.)	Panathinaikos
	Report

AEK Stadium, Nea Filadelfia
Attendance: 28,155
Referee: Andre Möhler (Switzerland)
