= Dimitrios Stefanakos =

Greek footballer (1936–2021)

Mimis Stefanakos
Personal information
- Full name: Dimitrios Stefanakos
- Date of birth: 19 October 1936
- Place of birth: Kalamata, Greece
- Date of death: 17 December 2021 (aged 85)
- Position: Defender

Senior career*
Years	Team	Apps	(Gls)
1946–1958	Iperochi Neapoleos		
1958–1965	Olympiacos	170	(3)
1965	Rangers Johannesburg		
1965	Corinthians Johannesburg		

International career
1958–1963	Greece	8	(0)
1960	Greece Olympic	3	(0)
- * Club domestic league appearances and goals

Dimitrios "Mimis" Stefanakos (Greek: Δημήτριος "Μίμης" Στεφανάκος; 19 October 1936 – 17 December 2021) was a Greek footballer who played for Olympiacos and the Greece national team.

== Career ==
Born in Kalamata, Stefanakos fled the German occupation with his family before beginning his football career as a defender with Iperochi Neapoleos in 1946, until he joined Alpha Ethniki side Olympiacos F.C. in July 1965. He spent most of his senior career with Olympiacos winning the league championship six times and the cup eight times. Stefanakos left Olympiacos in 1965 for Rangers in South Africa, and finished his career with Corinthians in Brazil.

Stefanakos made eight appearances for the Greece national team from 1958 to 1963.

== Honours ==
Olympiacos

- Panhellenic Championship: 1957–58, 1958–59
- Greek Cup:1958, 1959, 1960, 1961, 1963 και 1965
- Piraeus' League: 1958, 1959

== Filmography ==
Stefanakos appeared in seven Greek movies.

== Personal life and death ==
Stefanakos was married to Martha Karagianni. The couple had a child who died three days after the birth. The couple separated few months later. He died on 17 December 2021, at the age of 85.
