= 1958–59 Panhellenic Championship =

23rd season of top-tier football league in Greece

Panhellenic Championship
- Season: 1958–59
- Champions: Olympiacos; 15th Greek title
- Relegated: none
- European Cup: Olympiacos
- Matches played: 90
- Goals scored: 249 (2.77 per match)
- Top goalscorer: Kostas Nestoridis (21 goals)
- Biggest home win: Panionios 6–1 PAOK
- Biggest away win: Aris 1–5 Olympiacos; PAOK 0–4 Panionios
- Highest scoring: Panionios 6–1 PAOK

The 1958–59 Panhellenic Championship was the 23rd season of the highest football league of Greece and the last one that was held with the system of qualifying rounds per local association, as from the following year the structure of Greek football changed with the introduction of Alpha Ethniki, as well as the other categories in following seasons. Olympiacos won their 15th championship (6 consecutive) after an interesting race with AEK Athens.

Compared to the previous season, the teams that participated in the final round of the championship decreased by 2 (10 out of 12) and resulted as follows:

- Athenian Championship: The first 3 teams of the ranking.
- Piraeus' Championship: The first 2 teams of the ranking.
- Macedonian Championship: The first 2 teams of the ranking.
- Regional Championship: The 2 winners (North and South Group).
- An additional position was secured after a play-off round between the third teams Piraeus' and Macedonian Championship.

The qualifying round matches took place from 7 September 1958 to 14 January 1959, while the final round took place from 21 January to 21 June 1959. The point system was: Win: 3 points - Draw: 2 points - Loss: 1 point.

== Qualification round ==
=== Athens Football Clubs Association ===
Pos	Team	Pld	W	D	L	GF	GA	GD	Pts	Qualification
1	Panathinaikos (Q)	14	9	5	0	23	7	+16	37	Final round 1959–60 Alpha Ethniki
2	Panionios (Q)	14	6	8	0	23	10	+13	34	Final round 1959–60 Alpha Ethniki
3	AEK Athens (Q)	14	6	7	1	17	8	+9	33	Final round 1959–60 Alpha Ethniki
4	Apollon Athens	14	7	3	4	20	8	+12	31	1959–60 Alpha Ethniki
5	Egaleo	14	4	5	5	14	19	−5	27	
6	Fostiras	14	2	6	6	10	13	−3	24	
7	Asteras Athens	14	1	5	8	15	27	−12	21	
8	Athinaikos	14	0	3	11	3	33	−30	17	

Source: rsssf
(Q) Qualified for the phase indicated

Home \ Away	PAO	PGSS	AEK	APOL	EGA	FOS	AST	ATH
Panathinaikos		0–0	1–1	1–0	3–1	2–0	2–0	5–0
Panionios	2–2		1–1	1–0	2–1	2–1	6–1	3–0
AEK Athens	1–1	0–2		0–0	2–1	0–0	2–1	4–0
Apollon Athens	0–1	1–1	0–1		1–0	1–0	2–1	1–0
Egaleo	2–2	0–0	1–1	0–4		0–0	3–3	2–1
Fostiras	0–1	1–1	0–1	1–1	0–1		3–2	0–0
Asteras Athens	0–1	2–2	0–0	0–3	1–2	0–0		3–0
Athinaikos	0–1	0–0	0–3	0–5	0–1	1–4	1–1	

Source: rsssf
Legend: Blue = home team win; Yellow = draw; Red = away team win.

=== Piraeus Football Clubs Association ===
Pos	Team	Pld	W	D	L	GF	GA	GD	Pts	Qualification
1	Olympiacos (Q)	14	11	3	0	30	7	+23	39	Final round 1959–60 Alpha Ethniki
2	Ethnikos Piraeus (Q)	14	6	6	2	22	19	+3	32	Final round 1959–60 Alpha Ethniki
3	AE Nikaia (A)	14	4	7	3	12	14	−2	29	3rd-place play-offs 1959–60 Alpha Ethniki
4	Proodeftiki	14	4	6	4	14	15	−1	28	1959–60 promotion play-offs
5	Panelefsiniakos	14	5	3	6	18	17	+1	27	
6	Aris Piraeus	14	3	5	6	20	25	−5	25	
7	Atromitos Piraeus	14	4	2	8	13	20	−7	24	
8	Argonaftis	14	0	6	8	12	24	−12	20	

Source: rsssf
(A) Advance to a further round; (Q) Qualified for the phase indicated

Home \ Away	OLY	ETH	AEN	PRO	PAN	ARIS	ATR	ARG
Olympiacos		4–1	2–0	3–1	4–2	4–0	1–0	3–0
Ethnikos Piraeus	1–1		2–2	1–1	4–2	1–0	2–1	2–2
AE Nikaia	0–0	1–2		2–1	1–0	2–2	0–0	1–1
Proodeftiki	1–3	0–0	0–0		0–0	2–1	3–2	1–0
Panelefsiniakos	0–0	1–2	3–0	0–0		2–1	3–0	1–1
Aris Piraeus	1–2	1–0	1–1	2–2	3–1		4–1	2–2
Atromitos Piraeus	0–2	0–2	0–1	1–0	1–0	4–1		3–2
Argonaftis	0–1	3–3	0–1	0–2	0–2	1–1	0–0	

Source: rsssf
Legend: Blue = home team win; Yellow = draw; Red = away team win.

=== Macedonia Football Clubs Association ===
Pos	Team	Pld	W	D	L	GF	GA	GD	Pts	Qualification
1	Aris (Q)	10	6	3	1	21	10	+11	25	Final round 1959–60 Alpha Ethniki
2	PAOK (Q)	10	5	3	2	14	8	+6	23	Final round 1959–60 Alpha Ethniki
3	Apollon Kalamarias (Note: Apollon Kalamarias has 1 defeat without a match and -1 point.) (A)	10	5	2	3	12	9	+3	21 (Note: 3rd place ranking match: Apollon Kalamarias–Iraklis 1–1. Apollon was qualified due to better goal difference.)	3rd-place play-offs 1959–60 Alpha Ethniki
4	Iraklis	10	4	3	3	13	11	+2	21	1959–60 promotion play-offs
5	Thermaikos	10	1	3	6	9	16	−7	15	
6	Makedonikos	10	1	2	7	7	22	−15	14	

Source: rsssf
(A) Advance to a further round; (Q) Qualified for the phase indicated
Notes:

Home \ Away	ARIS	PAOK	APOL	IRA	THER	MAK
Aris		2–1	2–1	2–0	3–3	4–0
PAOK	0–0		2–1 (Note: Suspended at the 83rd minute while the score was 2–1 for PAOK. That remained as the final score.)	1–1	2–1	5–1
Apollon Kalamarias	2–1	0–1		1–0	1–1	3–1
Iraklis	2–2	1–0	1–1		3–1	2–1
Thermaikos	1–2	0–1	0–1	0–2		1–0
Makedonikos	0–3	1–1	0–1	2–1	1–1	

Source: rsssf
Legend: Blue = home team win; Yellow = draw; Red = away team win.

=== Piraeus/Macedonia 3rd teams play-offs ===
Team 1	Agg.	Team 2	1st leg	2nd leg
AE Nikaia	2–3	Apollon Kalamarias	0–1	2–2

=== Regional Championship ===
==== North Group ====
Pos	Team	Pld	W	D	L	GF	GA	GD	Pts	Qualification
1	Doxa Drama (Q)	6	5	0	1	21	9	+12	16	Final round 1959–60 Alpha Ethniki
2	Megas Alexandros	6	4	1	1	13	9	+4	15	1959–60 Alpha Ethniki
3	Aspida Xanthi	6	1	2	3	8	12	−4	10	1959–60 promotion play-offs
4	Achileas Trikalon	6	0	1	5	9	21	−12	7	

Source: rsssf
(Q) Qualified for the phase indicated

Home \ Away	DOX	MEG	ASP	ACH
Doxa Drama		4–0	2–1	7–1
Megas Alexandros	4–2		4–1	2–1
Aspida Xanthi	1–2	0–0		3–2
Achileas Trikalon	2–4	1–3	2–2	

Source: rsssf
Legend: Blue = home team win; Yellow = draw; Red = away team win.

==== South Group A ====
Pos	Team	Pld	W	D	L	GF	GA	GD	Pts	Qualification
1	Pankorithiakos (A)	4	3	0	1	8	3	+5	10 (Note: Ranking match: Pankorithiakos–Olympiacos Chalkida 1–0.)	South Group play-offs 1959–60 Alpha Ethniki
2	Olympiacos Chalkida	4	3	0	1	6	2	+4	10	1959–60 South Group 2nd-place play-offs
3	Diagoras	4	0	0	4	1	10	−9	4	

Source: rsssf
(A) Advance to a further round
Notes:

Home \ Away	PAN	OLY	DIA
Pankorithiakos		1–0	4–1
Olympiacos Chalkida	2–1		2–0
Diagoras	0–2	0–2	

Source: rsssf
Legend: Blue = home team win; Yellow = draw; Red = away team win.

==== South Group B ====
Pos	Team	Pld	W	D	L	GF	GA	GD	Pts	Qualification
1	Panegialios (A)	4	3	1	0	8	1	+7	11	South Group play-offs 1959–60 Alpha Ethniki
2	OFI	4	1	2	1	5	2	+3	8	1959–60 South Group 2nd-place play-offs
3	Apollon Kalamata	4	0	1	3	2	12	−10	5	

Source: rsssf
(A) Advance to a further round

Home \ Away	PAN	OFI	APOL
Panegialios		0–0	1–0
OFI	0–0		4–0
Apollon Kalamata	1–6	1–1	

Source: rsssf
Legend: Blue = home team win; Yellow = draw; Red = away team win.

==== South Group play-offs ====
Team 1	Agg.	Team 2	1st leg	2nd leg
Panegialios	5–2	Pankorithiakos	4–2	1–0

== Final round ==
=== League table ===
Pos	Team	Pld	W	D	L	GF	GA	GD	Pts	Qualification
1	Olympiacos (C)	18	14	2	2	43	19	+24	48	Qualification for European Cup preliminary round
2	AEK Athens	18	12	4	2	39	20	+19	46	
3	Panionios	18	7	5	6	33	27	+6	37	
4	Panathinaikos	18	8	2	8	21	18	+3	36	
5	Doxa Drama	18	6	5	7	23	26	−3	35	
6	Aris	18	7	2	9	22	24	−2	34	
7	Ethnikos Piraeus	18	5	4	9	23	29	−6	32	
8	PAOK	18	5	4	9	14	34	−20	32	
9	Apollon Kalamarias (Note: Apollon Kalamarias has a defeat without a match and –1 point.)	18	6	1	11	16	23	−7	30	
10	Panegialios (Note: Panegialios has a victory without a match.)	18	2	7	9	15	29	−14	29	

Source: rsssf
(C) Champions

=== Results ===
Home \ Away	OLY	AEK	PGSS	PAO	DOX	ARIS	ETH	PAOK	APOL	PAN
Olympiacos		2–2	3–2	2–0	4–1	3–0	3–1	4–0	1–0	3–1
AEK Athens	1–2		4–2	2–1	3–0	1–0	2–1	0–1	4–1	4–1
Panionios	1–3	0–1		0–2	2–2	2–0	2–1	6–1	2–1	2–1
Panathinaikos	1–2	1–2	0–0		0–2	3–1	3–1	3–0	0–3	1–0
Doxa Dramas	1–1	2–2	3–1	0–2		0–1	3–1	0–0	1–2	2–1
Aris	1–5	2–3	2–2	1–0	3–0		0–1	1–2	2–0	4–0
Ethnikos Piraeus	2–3	1–1	2–2	0–2	0–2	1–3		3–0	2–0	2–0
PAOK	2–3	1–3	0–4	1–0	1–0	1–0	2–2		0–1	1–1
Apollon Kalamarias	2–0	0–2	0–2	0–1	1–2	0–0	0–1	3–1		0–2 (Note: Match suspended at 70th minute. Awarded 0–2 to Panegialios.)
Panegialios	1–0	2–2	1–1	1–1	2–2	0–1	1–1	0–0	0–2	

Source: rsssf
Legend: Blue = home team win; Yellow = draw; Red = away team win.

== Top scorers ==
Rank	Player	Club	Goals
1	(Greece) Kostas Nestoridis	AEK Athens	21
2	(Greece) Elias Yfantis	Olympiacos	13
3	(Greece) Thanasis Loukanidis	Doxa Drama	9
