= Yüksel Gündüz =

Turkish footballer (1937–2023)

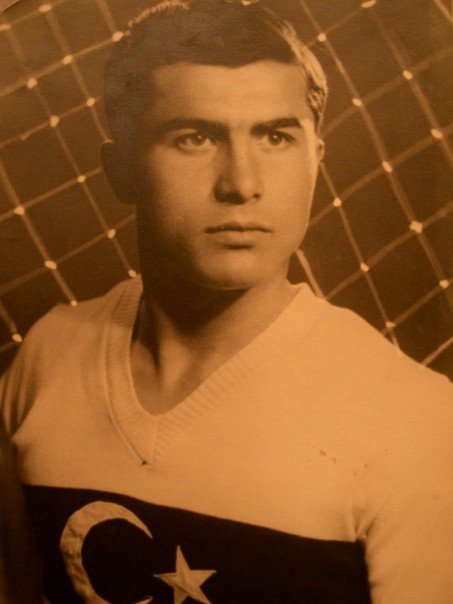

Personal information
- Date of birth: 20 December 1937
- Place of birth: Tavşanlı District, Turkey
- Date of death: June 2023 (aged 85)
- Height: 1.82 m (6 ft 0 in)
- Positions: Forward; winger

Youth career
- 1947–????: Ankara Dışkapıspor
- –1955: Ankara Güneşspor

Senior career*
Years	Team	Apps	(Gls)
1955–1957	Ankara Güneşspor		
1957–1965	Fenerbahçe	130	(49)
1965–1966	İstanbulspor	4	(0)

International career
1955–1963	Turkey U18	6	(0)
1959–1961	Turkey B	2	(1)
1962	Turkey	1	(0)
1967	Turkey U21	1	(0)
- * Club domestic league appearances and goals

Yüksel Gündüz (20 December 1937 – June 2023) was a Turkish footballer who played as a forward and winger.

== Career ==
Gündüz began his youth career at Ankara Dışkapıspor, before joining Ankara Güneşspor, where he made his debut in 1955. In 1957, he joined Fenerbahçe, where he later scored the club's first ever goal in the Turkish Cup, during a 2–1 win against Adana Demirspor. Overall, he played 268 total matches for Fenerbahçe, scoring 115 goals and helping them win the 1958–59 Istanbul Football League and three Süper Lig titles.

He made one appearance for the Turkish national team in April 1962, where he played 22 minutes in a 2–1 defeat against Hungary in Budapest. He had previously played for the country's under-18's, under-21's, and B team, with one B team appearance being at the 1959 Mediterranean Games.

Following his retirement, he served on the Fenerbahçe Board of Directors.
