= Asteras Exarchion =

Greek sports club

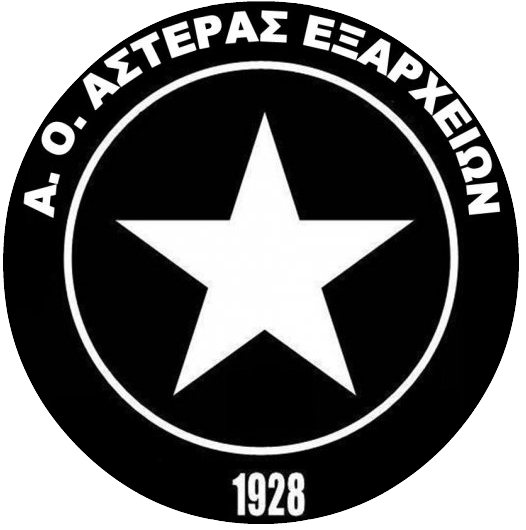
- Full name: Athletic Club Asteras Exarchion
- Founded: 1928 (under current name from 1967)
- Ground: Exarchia, Athens
- League: Athens Football Clubs Association Division B
- Website: https://asteras1928.wordpress.com/

Asteras Exarchion, alternatively called Asteras Exarchia (Greek: Αστέρας Εξαρχείων), is a Greek sports club from Exarcheia, Athens, founded in 1928, but competing under its current name from 1967. The club has three active sports sections: Men's Basketball, Women's Basketball and men's football sections. The women's basketball team compete in the top division the A1 Ethniki, and the men's football team compete in the amateur Athens Football Clubs Association Division B. The club colours are black and white.

== History ==
The history of the current club is complex due to the number of mergers and name changes in its history. The club dates back to 1928 but adopted its current name in 1967.

=== Achilles Naples ===
Refers from the 1930-31 season, when sponsored by Athens Mayor S. Mercouri 1931 to 1932 the team participated in the C category of SFA Athens with the sum of 2,000 drachmas. Next season 1932-33 not subsidized and their following history is unknown.

=== Excellence Naples ===
From the antebellum period in the district of Exarheia was the Football Association "Excellence Naples", founded around 1928. In 1931–32 season they received a grant from the City of Athens 2,500 drachmas from wonderfully started his career and struggled as the 1958 international footballer Mimis Stefanakos who made a great career in Olympiacos. The first post-war season 1944-45 the Primacy participated in league ISL Athens, in the C division, and continued to small groups of EPSA as the season 1956–57 . The team colors were blue and white.

=== Panexarcheiakos Supporters Group ===
Participated in small classes of EPSA from season 1949-50 to season 1956-57, chaired by the Emm campaign. In October 1952 he founded and partook in the basketball section. During this period (1948–52) there has been a very active and independent association called "Enosis Exarheia," not evolved into an official club, and various non-formal clubs (basically groups of players) such as: Meliteus (1949), luminary Eq. (1951), Victory Eq. (1951), Dorian (1952) Thunderbolt (1952) etc.

=== DP Exarheia-Naples (or ASEM) ===
Founded in June 1957 by the merger of Excellence with Panexarcheiako, then struggling in the B2 category of EPSA, the first president of Professor NATURAL. Rep. Delopoulo treatment. A first attempt to merge the two clubs had been in 1954 without success. The ASEM participated in the championship of EPSA as the season 1966-67, low categories. The ASEM had colors "cyan" (supremacy) and "yellow" (the Panexarcheiakou). Besides the football club, the new club had also a basketball team based in the court of Strefi Hill and part fighting, with 80 athletes (better known: Karystinos, Papalazarou, Alex) led by protopalaisti Charisiadis, which had existed since 1954 Housed in training area in New Slaughterhouses (street Piraeus 200). In ASEM invited to participate, and neighboring clubs "White Aster" and "Hercules Museum", without response.

=== White Aster Lycabettus ===
Was an informal club since 1927. During postwar participated in the championships of EPSA since the early '50s as the season 1966–67, who was in the A2 category. In 1954 the Board the club refused a proposal to merge with excellence. AO "Astir" Exarheia: founded in the summer of 1967 after the forced merger imposed by the dictatorial regime of both old Athenian football teams: "White Aster Lycabettus" and "AS Exarheia-Naples" (ASEM). The previous season 1966-67 the White Aster participated in the A2 category of SFA Athens, which after the reformation which placed the new group of AO Star in division B, an amateur league in which the men's football section plays to this day.

== Women's basketball ==
The clubs first title was winning the Second Division (national B) in 1992. Winning the league A2 National League the season 1998-99 was the club's ticket for its return to A1 Ethniki next fall which started a successful period for the club and the end to its anonymity. Its first year in this new cycle, from 1999 to 2000 was quite successful in bringing club to 5th position. The following season, 2000-01 was even more successful, as the team completed the season in 3rd place, an achievement they repeated the next two years, 2001–02 and 2002-03 followed by a 5th the season after. Meanwhile, the club reached the final of the Greek Cup held on 22 February 2004 in Athens . There, they lost the trophy from D.A.S. Ano Liosia by a score of 64-59. They were relegated the next season.

Starting in the A2 Ethniki Asteras ranked 3rd in the final standings of Group South for the 2005-06 season. In the following year they were able to return for another term at A1 National, finishing 2nd behind leader Athens, with 23 wins and 3 losses. However, this stay was short-lived, as the end of the 2007-08 season it found itself in the 12th position in the league.

The return of the club in the A2 Ethniki was accompanied by moderate performances and so in the year 2008-09 the club finished in 7th place. In addition, as regards the Greek Cup, was defeated by a score of 46 -64 from F.E.A. and eliminated. During the 2009-10 season Asteras climbed to 4th-place ranking, while the Cup came in the second phase where eliminated by scoring 53 -58 by OA Chania .

The next year, 2010–11, the team Exarheia, having just one defeat on the road in the South Group, secured first place with coach Sunday Tsiantouka, sealing his return to the top division of the Greek league. In the Cup they were eliminated during the 3rd day of the Phase A when was defeated by Saturn St. Demetrios with a score of 73-71.

The 2011-12 A1 National League season they finished 5th and were eliminated in the "Round of 16" where they were defeated by a score 63-45 by F.E.A in the Cup.

== Fans ==
The Exarcheia region is famous as a stomping ground for Greek anarchists, and their fans are known to have strong anti-fascist and anti-racist views, and are politically involved. Despite playing in the lower divisions, they can amass up to 200 fans in a game.

== Notable athletes ==
Women's basketball team has had many international basketball players including Olga Chatzinikolaou, Anastasia Kostaki and Zuzana Klimešová.

The men's football team was where Greek coach Nikos Alefantos started his managing career.

== Honours ==
=== Men's basketball ===
- Third National Champions: 1994
- ESKA Champions: 1987

=== Women's basketball ===
- National A2 Champions: 1999, 2011
- National B Champions: 1992
