= Takis Papoulidis =

Greek footballer (1934–1998)

Personal information
- Full name: Panagiotis Papoulidis
- Date of birth: 5 December 1934
- Place of birth: Kallithea, Athens, Greece
- Date of death: 5 September 1998 (aged 63)
- Place of death: Kallithea, Athens, Greece
- Position: Defender

Senior career*
Years	Team	Apps	(Gls)
1955–1963	Panionios		
1963–1967	Panathinaikos		

International career
1957–1965	Greece	21	(0)

Managerial career
- 1974–1975: Kallithea
- 1978: Panathinaikos
- 1989: Panionios
- * Club domestic league appearances and goals

Panagiotis Papoulidis (Greek: Τάκης Παπουλίδης; 5 December 1934 – 5 September 1998) was a Greek footballer who played as a defender. He made 21 appearances for the Greece national team from 1957 to 1965.

== Honours ==
Panathinaikos

- Alpha Ethniki: 1963-64, 1964–65
