= Stathis Tsanaktsis =

Greek footballer

Personal information
- Date of birth: 27 February 1934
- Date of death: 1 February 2002 (aged 67)

International career
Years	Team	Apps	(Gls)
1957–1962	Greece	4	(0)

Stathis Tsanaktsis (27 February 1934 – 1 February 2002) was a Greek footballer. He played in four matches for the Greece national football team from 1957 to 1962.
