= 1959–60 Alpha Ethniki =

24th season of top-tier football league in Greece

Alpha Ethniki
- Season: 1959–60
- Champions: Panathinaikos; 4th Greek title
- Relegated: Pankorinthiakos; Megas Alexandros Katerinis; AE Nikaia
- European Cup: Panathinaikos
- Matches: 240
- Goals: 619 (2.58 per match)
- Top goalscorer: Kostas Nestoridis (33 goals)
- Biggest home win: Olympiacos 8–1 Panegialios
- Biggest away win: AE Nikaia 2–7 Ethnikos Piraeus
- Highest scoring: Olympiacos 8–1 Panegialios; AE Nikaia 2–7 Ethnikos Piraeus

The 1959–60 Alpha Ethniki was the 24th season of the highest football league of Greece and the first season of the nationwide league after the league replaced the Panhellenic Championship. The season began on 25 October 1959 and ended on 31 July 1960 with the play-off matches. Panathinaikos won their fourth Greek title and their first in seven years.

The 16 teams that formed the first national championship were resulted as follows:

- Panathenian Championship: The first 4 teams of the 1958–59 season. (Panathinaikos, Panionios, AEK Athens and Apollon Athens)
- Piraeus' Championship: The first 3 teams of the 1958–59 season. (Olympiacos, Ethnikos Piraeus and AE Nikaia)
- Macedonian Championship: The first 3 teams of the 1958–59 season. (Aris, PAOK and Apollon Kalamarias)
- Regional Championship South Group:The first 2 teams of the 1958–59 season. (Panegialios and Pankorinthiakos)
- Regional Championship North Group:The first 2 teams of the 1958–59 season. (Doxa Drama and Megas Alexandros Katerinis)
- The 2 final places were secured after a play-off matches by the 4th teams Piraeus' and Macedonian Championship against the 2nd teams of the South and North group respectively. (Proodeftiki and Iraklis against Olympiacos Chalkida or OFI and Aspida Xanthi)

The point system was: Win: 3 points - Draw: 2 points - Loss: 1 point.

Location of teams in 1959–60 Alpha Ethniki

== Qualification round ==
Initially there were going to be 18 teams in the first division, however, the delay of 6 weeks in the start of the event due to the financial negotiations between the involved parties General Secretary of Sport, OPAP, HFF and in some places FCAs, put its serious completion in a timely manner. The HFF took the decision to reduce the number of teams to 16 and as a consequence a promotional play-off round was formed to decide the last two places of the championship.

=== South Group 2nd-place play-offs ===
Team 1	Agg.	Team 2	1st leg	2nd leg	Play-off
Olympiacos Chalkida	4–3	OFI	2–1	1–2	1–0

Olympiacos Chalkida qualifies to the promotional Play-offs.

=== Promotion play-offs ===
South
Team 1	Agg.	Team 2	1st leg	2nd leg	Play-off
Olympiacos Chalkida	2–5	Proodeftiki	2–2	0–0	0–3

North
Team 1	Agg.	Team 2	1st leg	2nd leg
Iraklis	3–0	Aspida Xanthi	1–0	2–0

== League table ==
Pos	Team	Pld	W	D	L	GF	GA	GD	Pts	Qualification or relegation
1	Panathinaikos (C)	30	22	5	3	59	20	+39	79 (Note: Championship Play-off: Panathinaikos–AEK Athens 2–1 (see below).)	Qualification for European Cup
2	AEK Athens	30	21	7	2	72	27	+45	79	
3	Olympiacos	30	16	8	6	52	24	+28	70	
4	Apollon Athens	30	13	10	7	52	33	+19	66	
5	Panionios	30	14	6	10	46	31	+15	64	
6	Doxa Drama	30	11	8	11	47	41	+6	60	
7	PAOK	30	10	9	11	32	32	0	59 (Note: 7th place play-off: PAOK–Aris 0–0, PAOK were placed ahead Aris due to the better goal average in regular season.)	
8	Aris	30	10	9	11	31	35	−4	59	
9	Iraklis	30	9	10	11	29	34	−5	58 (Note: 9th place play-off: Iraklis–Proodeftiki 2–0.)	
10	Proodeftiki	30	10	8	12	34	36	−2	58	
11	Apollon Kalamarias	30	7	12	11	31	39	−8	56	
12	Ethnikos Piraeus	30	8	10	12	34	46	−12	56	
13	Panegialios	30	9	7	14	26	43	−17	55 (Note: Relegation play-out: Panegialios–Pankorinthiakos 2–1.)	
14	Pankorinthiakos (R)	30	9	7	14	27	45	−18	55	Relegation to FCA Winners' Championship
15	Megas Alexandros Katerinis (R)	30	4	9	17	27	60	−33	47	Relegation to FCA Winners' Championship
16	AE Nikaia (R)	30	2	5	23	20	73	−53	39	Relegation to FCA Winners' Championship

Source: RSSSF
Rules for classification: 1st points; 2nd decision match; 3rd head-to-head goal difference.
(C) Champions; (R) Relegated

== Results ==
Home \ Away	AEN	AEK	APA	APK	ARIS	DOX	ETH	IRA	MEG	OLY	PANK	PAO	PNG	PGSS	PAOK	PRO
AE Nikaia		0–3	0–2	0–2	2–3	0–3	2–7	1–2	3–2	1–4	3–0	0–1	0–2	0–5	1–1	0–1
AEK Athens	2–0		5–2	6–2	3–0	4–3	4–0	3–0	0–0	1–0	5–1	1–0	4–0	2–0	3–1	4–2
Apollon Athens	6–0	0–0		4–1	0–0	3–2	6–1	2–2	2–2	1–1	1–0	0–1	0–1	1–3	2–1	3–0
Apollon Kalamarias	2–2	1–1	0–2		1–0	1–1	2–2	0–0	5–1	0–0	2–0	1–2	0–0	0–0	1–0	0–1
Aris	2–1	2–2 (Note: Aris-AEK Athens 2-1, replayed 2-2.)	2–3	0–1		1–0	1–0	0–1	2–0	1–3	2–0	2–1	1–0	1–1	0–1	1–0
Doxa Drama	2–1	2–0	3–2	1–1	2–2		1–0	2–0	4–1	0–0	2–1	1–3	2–0	2–3	1–1	2–4
Ethnikos Piraeus	0–0	0–1	1–2	2–1	0–0	2–2		1–1	2–0	3–3	1–2	0–3	1–0	1–0	3–1	2–0
Iraklis	3–0	0–1	0–0	0–2	1–1	1–1	1–1		0–1	1–1	1–2	1–0	1–1	2–1	1–0	2–0
Megas Alexandros Katerinis	1–0	2–4	0–0	2–2	2–2	0–3	0–1	2–3		0–4	2–2	0–0	1–1	1–4	1–0	1–2
Olympiacos	2–1	0–1	2–0	3–0	1–1	1–1	2–0	1–0	4–0		1–0	1–4	8–1	1–0	1–2	3–1
Pankorinthiakos	1–1	0–0	1–4	2–2	2–0	1–0	1–1	1–0	1–0	1–0		1–2	2–1	0–1	0–0	1–0
Panathinaikos	6–1	2–2	0–0	2–0	3–0	1–0	3–0	4–1	3–0	0–0	4–2		2–1	4–3	1–0	2–1
Panegialios	1–0	1–4	3–2	3–1	2–0	1–0	1–0	1–0	1–2	0–2	1–1	0–1		0–0	2–3	0–0
Panionios	3–0	3–2	0–0	1–0	0–3	3–2	4–0	1–2	2–1	0–1	3–0	0–1	1–1		2–1	1–0
PAOK	0–0	1–2	1–2	0–0	0–0	3–1	1–1	2–1	3–2	2–0	2–0	0–2	2–0	0–0		2–1
Proodeftiki	4–0	2–2	0–0	1–0	2–1	0–1	1–1	1–1	0–0	1–2	3–1	1–1	2–0	2–1	1–1	

Source: RSSSF
Legend: Blue = home team win; Yellow = draw; Red = away team win.

=== Championship play-off ===
31 July 1960
17:00 EET

Panathinaikos	2–1	AEK Athens
Panakis 35'; Papaemmanouil 48'	Report	Ampos 14'

Karaiskakis Stadium, Piraeus
Attendance: 20,923
Referee: Daniel Mele (Switzerland)

== Top scorers ==
Rank	Player	Club	Goals
1	(Greece) Kostas Nestoridis	AEK Athens	33
2	(Greece) Giorgos Kamaras	Apollon Athens	19
3	(Greece) Elias Yfantis	Olympiacos	16
4	(Greece) Pavlos Grigoriadis	Doxa Drama	14
5	(Greece) Giannis Cholevas	Apollon Athens	13
6	(Greece) Vangelis Karafoulidis	Megas Alexandros Katerinis	11
6	(Greece) Lakis Sofianos	Panegialios	11
6	(Greece) Andreas Stamatiadis	AEK Athens	11

== Attendances ==
Panathinaikos drew the highest average home attendance in the 1959–60 Alpha Ethniki.

#	Team	Average attendance
1	Panathinaikos	13,394
2	AEK Athens	11,426
3	Olympiacos	11,101
4	Apollon Athens	6,865
5	PAOK	6,043
6	Proodeftiki	5,195
7	Aris	5,069
8	Ethnikos Piraeus	4,223
9	Panionios	3,833
10	Iraklis	3,830
11	Doxa Drama	3,335
12	Panegialios	2,934
13	Pankorinthiakos	2,807
14	Apollon Kalamarias	2,441
15	AE Nikaia	2,318
16	Megas Alexandros Katerinis	2,179
