= 1962–63 Greek Football Cup =

1962–63 Greek Cup
Tournament details
- Country: Greece

Final positions
- Champions: Olympiacos (11th title)
- Runners-up: Pierikos

Tournament statistics
- Top goal scorer(s): Giorgos Sideris (7 goals)

The 1962–63 Greek Football Cup was the 21st edition of the Greek Football Cup. The competition culminated with the Greek Cup Final, held at Leoforos Alexandras Stadium, Athens on 18 July 1963. The match was contested by Olympiacos and Pierikos, with Olympiacos winning by 3–0.

== Calendar ==
From Round of 32 onwards:

Round	Date(s)	Fixtures	Clubs	New entries
Round of 32	19 May 1963	17	32 → 16	16
Round of 16	5 June 1963	10	16 → 8	none
Quarter-finals	7 July 1963	5	8 → 4	none
Semi-finals	July 1963	3	4 → 2	none
Final	18 July 1963	1	2 → 1	none

== Knockout phase ==
In the knockout phase, teams play against each other over a single match. If the match ends up as a draw, extra time will be played and if the match remains a draw a replay match is set at the home of the guest team which the extra time rule stands as well. If a winner doesn't occur after the replay match the winner emerges by a flip of a coin.
The mechanism of the draws for each round is as follows:

- In the draw for the round of 32, the teams that had qualified to previous' season Round of 16 are seeded and the clubs that passed the qualification round are unseeded.
- In the draws for the round of 16 onwards, there are no seedings, and teams from the same group can be drawn against each other.

== Bracket ==
Round of 32
Aris	4
Anagennisi Karditsa	0
Iraklis	1
Doxa Drama	0
Atromitos	3
Pampaianikos	0
AEK Athens	7
Olympiacos Kalamata	1
Pagchaniakos	1
Olympiacos	6
Kadmos Thiva	0
Panionios	1
Proodeftiki (w/o)	2
Pankorinthiakos	0
Panathinaikos	6
Paniliakos	0
Niki Volos	4
Makedonikos	3
OFI	1	1
Panegialios	1	2
Anagennisi Giannitsa	0
Pierikos	2
Ethnikos Piraeus	1
Poseidon Glyfada	0
Averoff Ioannina	3
Apollon Athens	2
Olympiacos Kozani	1
Apollon Kalamarias	0
Veria	0	1
PAOK	0	2
Diagoras	1
Fostiras	3

Round of 16
Aris	0	3
Iraklis	0	0
Atromitos	0
AEK Athens	3
Olympiacos	2
Panionios	1
Proodeftiki	2	2
Panathinaikos	2	4
Niki Volos	3
Panegialios	1
Pierikos	2
Ethnikos Piraeus	1
Averoff Ioannina	4
Olympiacos Kozani	1
PAOK	3
Fostiras	2

Quarter-finals
Aris	1
AEK Athens	0
Olympiacos	5
Panathinaikos	3
Niki Volos	0	2
Pierikos	0	3
Averoff Ioannina	2
PAOK	0

Semi-finals
Aris	1	2
Olympiacos	1	5
Pierikos	4
Averoff Ioannina	0

Final
Olympiacos	3
Pierikos	0

== Round of 32 ==
Team 1	Score/Agg.	Team 2	Match	Replay
Kadmos Thiva	0–1	Panionios		
Ethnikos Piraeus	1–0	Poseidon Glyfada		
Pagchaniakos	1–6	Olympiacos		
Diagoras	1–3	Fostiras		
AEK Athens	7–1	Olympiacos Kalamata		
Atromitos	3–0	Pampaianikos		
Averoff Ioannina	3–2	Apollon Athens		
Niki Volos	4–3	Makedonikos		
Olympiacos Kozani	1–0	Apollon Kalamarias		
Iraklis	1–0	Doxa Drama		
Aris	4–0	Anagennisi Karditsa		
Panathinaikos	6–0	Paniliakos		
Anagennisi Giannitsa	0–2	Pierikos		
OFI	2–3	Panegialios	1–1 (a.e.t.)	1–2
Veria	1–2	PAOK	0–0 (a.e.t.)	1–2
Proodeftiki	2–0 (w/o)	Pankorinthiakos		

== Round of 16 ==
Team 1	Score/Agg.	Team 2	Match	Replay
Niki Volos	3–1	Panegialios		
Averoff Ioannina	4–1	Olympiacos Kozani		
Olympiacos	2–1	Panionios		
Pierikos	2–1	Ethnikos Piraeus		
PAOK	3–2	Fostiras		
Atromitos	0–3	AEK Athens		
Aris	3–0	Iraklis	0–0 (a.e.t.)	3–0
Proodeftiki	4–6	Panathinaikos	2–2 (a.e.t.)	2–4

== Quarter-finals ==
Team 1	Score/Agg.	Team 2	Match	Replay
Aris	1–0	AEK Athens		
Averoff Ioannina	2–0	PAOK		
Niki Volos	2–3	Pierikos	0–0 (a.e.t.)	2–3
Olympiacos	5–3	Panathinaikos		

== Semi-finals ==
Team 1	Score/Agg.	Team 2	Match	Replay
Aris	3–6	Olympiacos	1–1 (a.e.t.)	2–5
Pierikos	4–0	Averoff Ioannina		

== Final ==
18 July 1963

Olympiacos	3–0	Pierikos
Polychroniou 30'; Papazoglou 39'; Sideris 65'	Report

Leoforos Alexandras Stadium, Ampelokipoi
Attendance: 25,000
Referee: Otmar Humber (Switzerland)
