= 1960–61 Greek Football Cup =

1960–61 Greek Cup
Tournament details
- Country: Greece

Final positions
- Champions: Olympiacos (10th title)
- Runners-up: Panionios

Tournament statistics
- Top goal scorer(s): Kostas Nestoridis (13 goals)

The 1960–61 Greek Football Cup was the 19th edition of the Greek Football Cup. The competition culminated with the Greek Cup Final, held at Leoforos Alexandras Stadium, on 2 July 1961. The match was contested by Olympiacos and Panionios, with Olympiacos winning by 3–0.

== Calendar ==
From Round of 32 onwards:

Round	Date(s)	Fixtures	Clubs	New entries
Round of 32	2 April 1961	18	32 → 16	none
Round of 16	7 May 1961	8	16 → 8	none
Quarter-finals	7 June 1961	4	8 → 4	none
Semi-finals	1961	2	4 → 2	none
Final	7 July 1961	1	2 → 1	none

== Knockout phase ==
In the knockout phase, teams play against each other over a single match. If the match ends up as a draw, extra time will be played and if the match remains a draw a replay match is set at the home of the guest team which the extra time rule stands as well. If a winner doesn't occur after the replay match the winner emerges by a flip of a coin.

== Bracket ==
Round of 32
AE Orchomenos	0
Apollon Athens	3
Olympiacos Chalkida	1
Panegialios	0
Olympiacos	4
Panachaiki	2
Aris	2
Niki Volos	0
PAOK	1
Olympiacos Kozani	2
OFI (w/o)	2
Fostiras	0
AE Komotini	0
Doxa Drama	5
Pankorinthiakos	1
Atromitos	0
Atlantida Chania	0
Panionios	2
Atromitos Piraeus	0	1
Iraklis Kavala	0	1
Panathinaikos	6
Rodiakos	0
Achilleas Trikala	0
Apollon Kalamarias	3
Fillipoi Kavala	0	0
Iraklis	0	4
Olympiacos Volos	3
Olympos Katerini	4
AEK Athens	7
Prasina Poulia	3
Anagennisi Arta	1	1
Proodeftiki	1	2

Round of 16
Olympiacos Chalkida	0
Apollon Athens	2
Olympiacos	3
Aris	2
Olympiacos Kozani	4
OFI	2
Doxa Drama	1
Pankorinthiakos	0
Panionios	3
Iraklis Kavala	0
Panathinaikos	4
Apollon Kalamarias	1
Iraklis	3
Olympos Katerini	0
AEK Athens	4
Proodeftiki	1

Quarter-finals
Apollon Athens	1
Olympiacos	2
Olympiacos Kozani	0
Doxa Drama	1
Panionios	2
Panathinaikos	1
Iraklis	1
AEK Athens	0

Semi-finals
Olympiacos	3
Doxa Drama	0
Panionios	1
Iraklis	0

Final
Olympiacos	3
Panionios	0

== Round of 32 ==
Team 1	Score/Agg.	Team 2	Match	Replay
Achilleas Trikala	0–3	Apollon Kalamarias		
AE Komotini	0–5	Doxa Drama		
Olympiacos	4–2	Panachaiki		
Olympiacos Chalkida	1–0	Panegialios		
AEK Athens	7–3	Prasina Poulia		
Atlantida Chania	2–0	Panionios		
Pankorinthiakos	1–0	Atromitos		
Olympiacos Volos	3–4	Olympos Katerini		
PAOK	1–2	Olympiacos Kozani		
AE Orchomenos	0–3	Apollon Athens		
Aris	2–0	Niki Volos		
Panathinaikos	6–0	Rodiakos		
Fillipoi Kavala	0–4	Iraklis	0–0 (a.e.t.)	0–4
Anagennisi Arta	2–3	Proodeftiki	1–1 (a.e.t.)	1–2
Atromitos Piraeus	1–1	Iraklis Kavala	0–0 (a.e.t.)	1–1^{*}
OFI	2–0 (w/o)	Fostiras		

^{*}Qualified after draw.

== Round of 16 ==
Team 1	Score	Team 2
Panionios	3–0	Iraklis Kavala
Panathinaikos	4–1	Apollon Kalamarias
Olympiacos	3–2	Aris
Iraklis	3–0	Olympos Katerini
Olympiacos Chalkida	0–2	Apollon Athens
AEK Athens	4–1	Proodeftiki
Doxa Drama	1–0	Pankorinthiakos
Olympiacos Kozani	4–2 (a.e.t.)	OFI

== Quarter-finals ==
Team 1	Score	Team 2
Iraklis	1–0	AEK Athens
Olympiacos Kozani	0–1	Doxa Drama
Panionios	2–1	Panathinaikos
Apollon Athens	1–2	Olympiacos

== Semi-finals ==
Team 1	Score	Team 2
Panionios	1–0	Iraklis
Olympiacos	3–0	Doxa Drama

== Final ==
2 July 1961
17:00 EET

Olympiacos	3–0	Panionios
Papazoglou 34'; Sideris 69', 88'	Report

Leoforos Alexandras Stadium, Ampelokipoi
Attendance: 25,000
Referee: Cezare Jonni (Italy)
