= Giangos Simantiris =

Greek footballer

Personal information
- Date of birth: 5 February 1940
- Place of birth: Haifa, Mandatory Palestine
- Date of death: 9 March 2007 (aged 67)
- Position: Defender

Senior career*
Years	Team	Apps	(Gls)
1956–1960	Hapoel Haifa		
1960–1965	Olympiacos		
1965-1969	OF Irakliou		
1969-1974	AE Larisas		

International career
1959	Israel	1	(0)
1961	Greece	1	(0)
- * Club domestic league appearances and goals

Giangos Simantiris, also known as Yango Simantiri, (5 February 1940 – 9 March 2007) was a footballer who played international football for both Israel and Greece. He played as a defender for Hapoel Haifa, Olympiacos, OF Irakliou and AE Larisas.
