= Thanasis Saravakos =

Greek footballer

Personal information
- Full name: Athanasios Saravakos
- Date of birth: 18 January 1932
- Place of birth: Argos, Greece
- Date of death: 13 January 2009 (aged 76)
- Place of death: Greece
- Height: 1.60 m (5 ft 3 in)
- Position: Forward

Youth career
- –1949: PAO Thriamvos Athens
- 1949–1951: Panionios

Senior career*
Years	Team	Apps	(Gls)
1951–1966	Panionios	173	(63)
Total		173	(63)

International career
1953	Greece Military	4	(0)
1962–1965	Greece	3	(0)
- * Club domestic league appearances and goals

Thanasis Saravakos (Greek: Θανάσης Σαραβάκος; 18 January 1932 – 13 January 2009) was a Greek international football player who played as a forward for Panionios. He played in three matches for the Greece national football team from 1962 to 1965. He was also the father of the Greek international footballer Dimitris Saravakos.

Panionios' squad in 1950–51 season

== Honours ==
Panionios

- Athens FCA Championship: 1951

== See also ==
- List of one-club men in association football
