= 1910 in association football =

The following are the football (soccer) events of the year 1910 throughout the world.

== Events ==
- 20 November, Portuguese team Vitória F.C. is founded.
- 1 September – The foundation of Sport Club Corinthians Paulista.
- 24 February, Swedish team Malmö FF is founded.
- Suffering from financial problems and close to bankruptcy, Woolwich Arsenal are liquidated and reformed, being bought out by Fulham chairman Henry Norris.
- Millwall Athletic move from their ground in North Greenwich to The Old Den in New Cross.
- Ayr United F.C. is founded.

== Men's national leagues ==
Nation	League	Champion	Second place	Title	Last honour
Argentina	1910 Argentine Primera División	Alumni	Porteño	9th	1909
Belgium	1909–10 Belgian First Division	Union Saint-Gilloise	FC Brugeois	6th	1908–09
England	1909–10 First Division	Aston Villa	Liverpool	6th	1899–1900
Germany	1910 German football championship	Karlsruher FV	Holstein Kiel	1st	—N/a
Greece	1910 SEGAS Championship	Goudi Athens	Peiraikos Syndesmos	2nd	1908
Hungary	1909–10 Nemzeti Bajnokság I	Ferencváros	MTK Budapest FC	5th	1908–09
Italy	1909–10 Prima Categoria	Internazionale Milano F.C.	Pro Vercelli	1st	—N/a
Luxembourg	1909–10 Luxembourg National Division	Racing Club Luxembourg	US Hollerich	1st	—N/a
Netherlands	1909–10 Netherlands Football League Championship	HVV Den Haag	Quick Nijmegen	9th	1906–07
Paraguay	1910 Paraguayan Primera División season	Club Libertad	Atlántida	1st	—N/a
Romania	1909–10 Divizia A	Olympia București	Colentina București	1st	—N/a
Scotland	1909–10 Scottish Division One	Celtic	Falkirk	10th	1908–09
Sweden	1909–10 Swedish football champions	IFK Göteborg	Djurgårdens IF	2nd	1908
Uruguay	1910 Campeonato Uruguayo Primera División	River Plate F.C.	CURCC	2nd	1908

== Men's domestic cups ==
Nation	Cup	Champion	Final score	Second place	Venue	Title	Last honour
Scotland	1909–10 Scottish Cup	Dundee	Final: 2–2; Replay: 0–0; Second Replay: 2–1	Clyde	Ibrox Park	1st	—N/a

== Men's national Tier II leagues ==
Nation	League	Champion	Second place	Title	Last honour
Scotland	1909–10 Scottish Division Two	Leith Athletic	Raith Rovers	2nd	1905–06

== International tournaments ==
- 1910 British Home Championship (March 12 – April 11, 1912)

Scotland

== Births ==
- 22 January – Raúl Alexandre, Portuguese footballer (d. ?)
- 27 March – Bob Robinson, English professional footballer (d. 1989)
- 3 April – Danny Edgar, English professional footballer (d. 1991)
- 31 December – Albert Curwood, professional footballer (d. 1971)
