= 1908–09 Football League =

21st season of the Football League

The Football League
- Season: 1908–09
- Champions: Newcastle United
- Relegated: Chesterfield
- New Clubs in League: Bradford Park Avenue; Tottenham Hotspur

The 1908–09 season was the 21st season of The Football League.

Tottenham Hotspur played their first ever season in the Football League. Spurs, along with Bradford Park Avenue entered the Second Division to replace Lincoln City and Stoke.

== Final league tables ==
Beginning in the 1894–95 season, clubs finishing level on points were separated according to goal average (goals scored divided by goals conceded). In case one or more teams had the same goal difference, this system favoured those teams who had scored fewer goals. The goal average system was eventually scrapped beginning with the 1976–77 season.

During the first six seasons of the league, (up to the 1893–94 season), re-election process concerned the clubs which finished in the bottom four of the league. From the 1894–95 season and until the 1920–21 season the re-election process was required of the clubs which finished in the bottom three of the league.

== First Division ==
First Division
- Season: 1908–09
- Champions: Newcastle United; 3rd English title
- Relegated: Manchester City; Leicester Fosse
- Matches: 380
- Goals: 1,185 (3.12 per match)
- Top goalscorer: Bert Freeman (38 goals)
- Biggest home win: Nottingham Forest 12–0 Leicester Fosse (21 April 1909)
- Biggest away win: Newcastle United 1–9 Sunderland (5 December 1908)
- Highest scoring: Nottingham Forest 12–0 Leicester Fosse (21 April 1909)

Pos	Team	Pld	W	D	L	GF	GA	GAv	Pts	Relegation
1	Newcastle United (C)	38	24	5	9	65	41	1.585	53	
2	Everton	38	18	10	10	82	57	1.439	46	
3	Sunderland	38	21	2	15	78	63	1.238	44	
4	Blackburn Rovers	38	14	13	11	61	50	1.220	41	
5	The Wednesday	38	17	6	15	67	61	1.098	40	
6	Woolwich Arsenal	38	14	10	14	52	49	1.061	38	
7	Aston Villa	38	14	10	14	58	56	1.036	38	
8	Bristol City	38	13	12	13	45	58	0.776	38	
9	Middlesbrough	38	14	9	15	59	53	1.113	37	
10	Preston North End	38	13	11	14	48	44	1.091	37	
11	Chelsea	38	14	9	15	56	61	0.918	37	
12	Sheffield United	38	14	9	15	51	59	0.864	37	
13	Manchester United	38	15	7	16	58	68	0.853	37	
14	Nottingham Forest	38	14	8	16	66	57	1.158	36	
15	Notts County	38	14	8	16	51	48	1.063	36	
16	Liverpool	38	15	6	17	57	65	0.877	36	
17	Bury	38	14	8	16	63	77	0.818	36	
18	Bradford City	38	12	10	16	47	47	1.000	34	
19	Manchester City (R)	38	15	4	19	67	69	0.971	34	Relegation to the Second Division
20	Leicester Fosse (R)	38	8	9	21	54	102	0.529	25	Relegation to the Second Division

Source: World Football
Rules for classification: 1) Points; 2) Goal average; 3) Goals scored
(C) Champions; (R) Relegated

=== Results ===
Home \ Away	AST	BLB	BRA	BRI	BRY	CHE	EVE	LEI	LIV	MCI	MUN	MID	NEW	NOT	NTC	PNE	SHU	SUN	WED	WOO
Aston Villa		1–1	1–3	1–1	3–0	0–0	3–1	1–1	1–1	2–1	3–1	0–3	3–0	1–2	1–1	2–4	3–0	2–0	1–1	2–1
Blackburn Rovers	3–1		1–1	1–1	0–1	2–0	0–0	3–0	1–0	3–2	1–3	0–0	2–4	0–3	0–2	1–1	0–1	8–1	2–2	1–3
Bradford City	1–1	0–2		0–1	4–1	3–0	1–1	4–1	0–2	0–0	1–0	0–2	1–2	1–1	2–2	2–0	3–1	0–2	0–0	4–1
Bristol City	0–0	1–4	0–1		4–2	1–0	0–2	1–1	1–0	1–0	0–0	1–1	3–3	2–1	1–0	2–3	1–1	2–4	1–1	2–1
Bury	1–2	1–1	2–1	1–2		2–1	2–2	2–2	2–1	1–0	2–2	2–1	1–1	3–2	3–1	0–1	1–2	4–2	4–2	1–1
Chelsea	0–2	1–1	1–1	3–1	4–1		3–3	1–0	3–0	1–2	1–1	3–0	1–2	2–1	3–2	0–0	1–1	2–0	2–2	1–2
Everton	3–1	4–4	0–1	5–2	4–0	3–2		4–2	5–0	6–3	3–2	1–1	0–1	3–3	0–1	0–1	5–1	4–0	1–0	0–3
Leicester Fosse	4–2	2–4	1–4	1–1	2–5	5–2	0–2		3–2	3–1	3–2	1–1	0–4	0–3	0–2	0–0	1–1	4–3	1–1	1–1
Liverpool	3–2	1–1	4–0	1–2	2–2	2–1	0–1	4–1		1–3	3–1	1–2	2–1	1–1	1–1	2–1	2–1	3–0	1–2	2–2
Manchester City	2–0	3–3	4–3	5–1	6–1	1–2	4–0	5–2	4–0		1–2	0–0	0–2	2–1	1–0	4–1	1–3	1–0	4–0	2–2
Manchester United	0–2	0–3	2–0	0–1	2–1	0–1	2–2	4–2	3–2	3–1		6–3	1–0	2–2	4–3	0–2	2–1	2–2	3–1	1–4
Middlesbrough	1–0	1–0	1–0	4–0	0–1	1–4	2–3	6–2	1–0	3–0	5–0		0–0	4–0	1–2	4–2	1–2	0–3	2–1	1–1
Newcastle United	0–2	2–0	1–0	2–1	3–1	1–3	3–0	2–0	0–1	2–0	2–1	1–0		1–1	1–0	2–0	4–0	1–9	1–0	3–1
Nottingham Forest	1–2	2–1	2–1	1–1	0–2	2–1	1–2	12–0	5–1	0–2	2–0	4–1	0–4		1–0	1–1	0–2	4–0	1–2	0–1
Notts County	1–1	2–3	1–1	0–1	3–2	3–0	0–0	2–3	1–2	5–1	0–1	3–2	0–4	3–0		1–0	3–1	0–0	1–0	2–1
Preston North End	3–2	2–0	0–0	2–1	0–2	6–0	3–3	0–1	2–0	3–0	0–3	1–1	0–1	1–1	0–0		1–1	1–0	4–1	0–0
Sheffield United	3–1	0–0	3–0	3–1	2–2	1–3	1–5	2–1	0–2	4–0	0–0	2–0	1–1	1–2	3–2	2–1		0–2	2–1	1–1
Sunderland	4–3	0–1	2–1	0–2	3–1	1–2	2–0	3–1	1–4	2–0	6–1	2–0	3–1	2–1	0–1	2–1	3–1		4–2	1–0
The Wednesday	4–2	1–2	0–2	2–0	4–3	5–1	2–0	3–1	2–3	3–1	2–0	3–2	2–0	3–0	2–0	1–0	1–0	2–5		6–2
Woolwich Arsenal	0–1	0–1	1–0	1–1	4–0	0–0	0–4	2–1	5–0	3–0	0–1	1–1	1–2	1–2	1–0	1–0	1–0	0–4	2–0	

Updated to match(es) played on unknown. Source:
Legend: Blue = home team win; Yellow = draw; Red = away team win.

=== Maps ===
Locations of the Football League First Division teams

== Second Division ==
Football League Second Division
- Season: 1908–09
- Champions: Bolton Wanderers (1st title)
- Failed re-election: Chesterfield
- Matches: 380
- Goals: 1,026 (2.7 per match)
- Top goalscorer: Alf Bentley (Derby County), 24
- Biggest home win: West Bromwich Albion – Grimsby Town 7–0 (2 January 1909)
- Biggest away win: Chesterfield – Hull City 0–4 (24 October 1909)
- Highest scoring: Burnley – Wolverhampton Wanderers 3–5 (7 November 1909)

Pos	Team	Pld	W	D	L	GF	GA	GAv	Pts	Promotion or relegation
1	Bolton Wanderers (C, P)	38	24	4	10	59	28	2.107	52	Promotion to the First Division
2	Tottenham Hotspur (P)	38	20	11	7	67	32	2.094	51	Promotion to the First Division
3	West Bromwich Albion	38	19	13	6	56	27	2.074	51	
4	Hull City	38	19	6	13	63	39	1.615	44	
5	Derby County	38	16	11	11	55	41	1.341	43	
6	Oldham Athletic	38	17	6	15	55	43	1.279	40	
7	Wolverhampton Wanderers	38	14	11	13	56	48	1.167	39	
8	Glossop	38	15	8	15	57	53	1.075	38	
9	Gainsborough Trinity	38	15	8	15	49	70	0.700	38	
10	Fulham	38	13	11	14	58	48	1.208	37	
11	Birmingham	38	14	9	15	58	61	0.951	37	
12	Leeds City	38	14	7	17	43	53	0.811	35	
13	Grimsby Town	38	14	7	17	41	54	0.759	35	
14	Burnley	38	13	7	18	51	58	0.879	33	
15	Clapton Orient	38	12	9	17	37	49	0.755	33	
16	Bradford (Park Avenue)	38	13	6	19	51	59	0.864	32	
17	Barnsley	38	11	10	17	48	57	0.842	32	
18	Stockport County	38	14	3	21	39	71	0.549	31	
19	Chesterfield Town (R)	38	11	8	19	37	67	0.552	30	Failed re-election and demoted
20	Blackpool	38	9	11	18	46	68	0.676	29	Re-elected

(C) Champions; (P) Promoted; (R) Relegated

=== Results ===
Home \ Away	BAR	BIR	BLP	BOL	BPA	BUR	CHF	CLA	DER	FUL	GAI	GLP	GRI	HUL	LEE	OLD	STP	TOT	WBA	WOL
Barnsley		3–1	4–0	0–1	3–1	1–2	4–0	3–0	1–0	1–2	2–2	1–3	3–1	2–1	2–1	2–0	2–0	1–1	0–2	1–1
Birmingham	2–1		2–2	2–0	3–1	2–0	3–0	1–0	1–1	1–3	2–2	1–2	3–1	1–2	1–0	2–0	4–2	3–3	0–0	1–1
Blackpool	1–1	2–0		1–2	2–1	0–0	2–2	1–3	2–2	2–0	3–0	2–1	2–2	2–3	1–0	1–0	2–1	1–1	0–2	3–1
Bolton Wanderers	3–0	2–1	3–1		0–1	2–1	4–0	2–0	1–0	0–0	4–0	2–0	2–0	1–0	2–0	3–0	4–1	0–1	1–1	1–1
Bradford Park Avenue	3–2	1–2	4–3	1–2		2–3	1–0	0–1	2–0	1–1	4–1	1–0	0–2	1–0	2–0	3–4	0–1	0–2	0–0	4–1
Burnley	3–2	1–1	1–1	1–2	3–3		0–1	0–1	2–0	1–3	5–2	3–2	2–0	1–0	0–0	1–0	5–1	1–2	0–2	3–5
Chesterfield	1–0	4–2	3–1	0–2	2–1	1–0		2–0	2–4	2–1	2–1	2–1	1–2	0–4	2–0	1–1	1–2	1–3	2–2	1–1
Clapton Orient	1–1	3–2	1–1	0–2	2–0	0–1	1–1		2–0	1–1	2–2	0–2	2–1	1–2	0–0	2–0	5–0	0–0	1–0	1–3
Derby County	0–0	1–2	1–1	1–0	3–1	1–0	1–1	1–0		2–1	5–0	4–0	2–1	0–0	5–1	1–0	5–0	1–1	2–1	2–1
Fulham	2–2	1–1	3–0	1–2	3–1	3–0	0–0	1–2	1–2		4–0	2–3	5–2	0–3	0–1	3–2	5–1	2–3	2–0	1–1
Gainsborough Trinity	4–1	1–3	1–0	2–1	2–1	1–0	3–0	2–0	0–0	1–1		3–1	0–3	2–0	1–1	1–4	3–2	0–2	2–0	1–0
Glossop	3–0	3–1	3–0	0–2	1–1	1–2	2–0	4–0	3–1	0–0	2–2		1–0	2–1	0–0	2–1	3–0	1–1	1–3	3–2
Grimsby Town	0–0	0–3	2–1	1–0	1–1	0–1	1–0	1–0	2–0	2–2	1–2	2–0		0–0	0–1	2–0	3–0	1–2	1–1	3–0
Hull City	4–0	4–1	2–0	2–0	2–3	3–2	1–0	3–2	4–0	2–0	5–1	0–0	0–1		4–1	1–0	4–1	1–0	2–2	0–1
Leeds City	2–0	2–0	1–0	1–2	0–3	1–1	3–0	0–0	2–5	2–0	0–2	3–1	4–1	2–0		3–0	2–1	1–0	1–1	5–2
Oldham Athletic	0–0	2–0	3–1	1–1	2–0	4–1	2–0	2–0	1–1	1–0	2–0	2–1	4–0	2–2	6–0		0–1	1–0	2–0	2–1
Stockport County	2–1	3–2	1–0	1–0	0–1	2–1	2–0	1–1	1–0	1–2	0–1	4–2	0–1	3–1	1–0	1–3		1–3	0–0	1–0
Tottenham Hotspur	4–0	4–0	4–1	2–1	3–0	4–2	4–0	0–1	0–0	1–0	1–1	3–3	2–0	0–0	3–0	3–0	0–0		1–3	3–0
West Bromwich Albion	1–1	1–1	5–1	2–0	1–0	0–0	2–2	1–0	2–0	1–1	2–0	1–0	7–0	1–0	2–1	1–0	2–0	3–0		0–2
Wolverhampton Wanderers	2–0	2–0	2–2	1–2	1–1	2–1	3–0	5–1	1–1	0–1	4–0	0–0	0–0	3–0	2–1	1–1	2–0	1–0	0–1	

Updated to match(es) played on unknown. Source: Ian Laschke: Rothmans Book of Football League Records 1888–89 to 1978–79. Macdonald and Jane’s, London & Sydney, 1980.
Legend: Blue = home team win; Yellow = draw; Red = away team win.

=== Maps ===
Locations of the Football League Second Division London teams
Locations of the Football League Second Division teams

== Attendances ==
=== First Division ===
#	Football club	Home games	Average attendance
1	Newcastle United	19	29,300
2	Chelsea FC	19	29,120
3	Everton FC	19	23,025
4	Bradford City	19	21,875
5	Manchester City	19	19,665
6	Aston Villa	19	18,945
7	Manchester United	19	18,150
8	Liverpool FC	19	17,660
9	Sunderland AFC	19	15,235
10	Blackburn Rovers	19	14,745
11	Middlesbrough FC	19	14,050
12	Woolwich Arsenal	19	13,025
13	The Wednesday	19	12,840
14	Leicester Fosse	19	12,790
15	Sheffield United	19	12,625
16	Bristol City	19	12,015
17	Nottingham Forest	19	11,090
18	Bury FC	19	10,975
19	Notts County	19	10,805
20	Preston North End	19	9,210

=== Second Division ===
#	Football club	Home games	Average attendance
1	Tottenham Hotspur	19	20,255
2	Fulham FC	19	16,340
3	West Bromwich Albion	19	15,525
4	Bolton Wanderers	19	12,850
5	Oldham Athletic	19	12,295
6	Bradford Park Avenue	19	11,350
7	Leeds City	19	11,055
8	Birmingham City	19	10,825
9	Clapton Orient	19	10,500
10	Wolverhampton Wanderers	19	8,620
11	Hull City	19	8,200
12	Burnley FC	19	6,815
13	Derby County	19	6,615
14	Stockport County	19	5,925
15	Barnsley FC	19	5,650
16	Gainsborough Trinity	19	5,380
17	Grimsby Town	19	5,235
18	Chesterfield Town	19	4,975
19	Blackpool FC	19	4,970
20	Glossop	19	3,430

== See also ==
- 1908–09 in English football
- 1908 in association football
- 1909 in association football
