= 1926–27 Atromitos F.C. season =

Atromitos
1926–27 season
- Chairman: Andreas Tsouroutsoylou
- AFCA League: 3rd
| Home colours | Away colours |

The 1926–27 season of Atromitos was the 4th in the club's history and the third season that the club were participating in the Athens Football Clubs Association League.

The chairman of the team was Andreas Tsouroutsoylou, the person that created the club.

== Players ==
=== Squad ===
Note: Flags indicate national team as defined under FIFA eligibility rules; some limited exceptions apply. Players may hold more than one non-FIFA nationality.

| No. | Pos. | Nation | Player |
|---|---|---|---|
| — | GK | GRE | Evgenios Origonis (captain) |
| — | DF | GRE | Petros Peradakos |
| — | DF | GRE | Achilleas Maniatis |
| — | MF | GRE | Papanikolaou |
| — | MF | GRE | Chalkousis |
| — | MF | GRE | P. Papadopoulos |
| — | FW | GRE | Th. Sarantopoulos |

| No. | Pos. | Nation | Player |
|---|---|---|---|
| — | FW | GRE | D. Stathopoulos |
| — | FW | GRE | Stamatopoulos |
| — | FW | GRE | D. Kalomvounis |
| — | FW | GRE | Rigopoulos |
| — | FW | GRE | Tsipourlianos |
| — | FW | GRE | Michos |
| — | FW | GRE | Vokos |

== Athens Football Clubs Association League ==
Competition: The league was conducted in one group, from which the top four teams would proceed to the final phase. The final phase was a single round-robin tournament, from which the team that finished first would be declared champions.

Atromitos made it to the final phase by finishing 3rd in the starting group, but came 3rd in the final phase as well, losing the title.

=== Qualification round ===
==== Table ====
| Pos | Team | Pld | W | D | L | GF | GA | GD | Pts | Qualification | AEK | PAO | ATR | APOL | GDI | ATH | ARM |
|---|---|---|---|---|---|---|---|---|---|---|---|---|---|---|---|---|---|
| 1 | AEK Athens (Q) | 6 | 4 | 2 | 0 | 16 | 7 | +9 | 10 | Final Round | | — | 4–2 | 1–1 | 3–1 | 2–0 | 4–1 |
| 2 | Panathinaikos (Q) | 5 | 3 | 2 | 0 | 18 | 6 | +12 | 8 | Final Round | 2–2 | | 3–0 | 2–1 | — | 8–1 | 2–0 |
| 3 | Atromitos (Q) | 6 | 3 | 1 | 2 | 17 | 11 | +6 | 7 | Final Round | — | — | | 6–0 | 4–2 | 5–2 | — |
| 4 | Apollon Athens (Q) | 6 | 2 | 3 | 1 | 11 | 13 | −2 | 7 | Final Round | — | — | — | | 3–1 | ― | 3–1 |
| 5 | Goudi Athens | 5 | 1 | 1 | 3 | 9 | 12 | −3 | 3 | | — | — | — | — | | 4–1 | 1–1 |
| 6 | Athinaikos | 6 | 1 | 1 | 4 | 9 | 21 | −12 | 3 | | — | — | — | 1–1 | — | | 4–1 |
| 7 | Armeniki Enosis (R) | 6 | 0 | 2 | 4 | 4 | 14 | −10 | 2 | | — | — | 0–0 | — | — | — | |

Source: rsssf
(Q) Qualified for the phase indicated; (R) Relegated

==== Matches ====
| 28 November 1926 2 | AEK Athens | 4–2 | Atromitos | Goudi |
| | Negrepontis 44', 55' (pen.), 67' (pen.); Iliaskos 90' | | Kolomvounis 20' (pen.); Tsipriakos 30' | Stadium: Goudi Stadium; Referee: D. Karabatis (Athens) |

| 19 December 1926 2 | Armeniki Enosis | 0–0 | Atromitos | Ampelokipoi |
| | | | | Stadium: Leoforos Alexandras Stadium |

| 23 January 1927 3 | Atromitos | 5–2 | Athinaikos | Athens |
| | Kolomvounis (pen.); Rigopoulos 29'; Stamatopoulos; Stathopoulos (pen.) | | | Stadium: Panellinios Stadium; Referee: Lorentis (Athens) |

| 30 January 1927 4 | Atromitos | 4–2 | Goudi Athens | Goudi |
| | Rigopoulos 20' | | Skiadas 2' (7) | Stadium: Goudi Stadium; Referee: Leonidas Kalogeropoulos (Athens) |

| 6 February 1927 5 | Apollon Athens | 0–6 | Atromitos | Ampelokipoi |
| | | | Stamatopoulos 55'; Stathopoulos 58'; Kolomvounis; Oikonomidis (o.g.) | Stadium: Leoforos Alexandras Stadium; Referee: Kaye (Athens) |

| 13 February 1927 6 | Panathinaikos | 3–0 | Atromitos | Ampelokipoi |
| | Aravostias (penalty missed) 10'; Sidiriopoulos 10'; 75' (pen.) | | | Stadium: Leoforos Alexandras Stadium; Referee: Lorentis (Athens) |
Note: The match was interrupted at the 75th minute.

=== Final round ===
==== Table ====
| Pos | Team | Pld | W | D | L | GF | GA | GD | Pts | Qualification | PAO | AEK | APOL | ATR |
|---|---|---|---|---|---|---|---|---|---|---|---|---|---|---|
| 1 | Panathinaikos (Note: A play-off round took place to decide the champion.) (Q) | 3 | 2 | 1 | 0 | 10 | 4 | +6 | 5 | Championship play-offs | | 1–1 | 4–2 | 5–1 |
| 2 | AEK Athens (Q) | 3 | 2 | 1 | 0 | 7 | 1 | +6 | 5 | Championship play-offs | — | | 2–0 | 4–0 |
| 3 | Apollon Athens | 2 | 0 | 0 | 2 | 2 | 6 | −4 | 0 | | — | — | | — (Note: Not played) |
| 4 | Atromitos | 2 | 0 | 0 | 2 | 1 | 9 | −8 | 0 | | — | — | — | |

Source: rsssf
(Q) Qualified for the phase indicated

==== Matches ====
| 20 March 1927 1 | AEK Athens | 4–0 | Atromitos | Ampelokipoi |
| 14:40 | Kargiotakis 15'; Negrepontis 31', 60' (pen.); Armash 80' | | | Stadium: Leoforos Alexandras Stadium; Referee: Leonidas Kalogeropoulos (Athens) |

| 8 May 1927 2 | Panathinaikos | 5–1 | Atromitos | Ampelokipoi |
| 16:00 | Aravositas (pen.); F. Asprogerakas | | Stathopoulos | Stadium: Leoforos Alexandras Stadium; Referee: Goudiou (Athens) |

| 3 | Apollon Athens | v | Atromitos | Athens |
Note: Not played.
