= Prosfygika =

Prosfygika, (Greek: Προσφυγικά, meaning "refugee houses"), may refer to the following settlements:

- Prosfygika, Patras, a neighborhood in the Greek city of Patras
- Prosfygika of Alexandras avenue, a neighborhood and occupied community adjuscent to the Alexandras avenue, in the Ampelokipoi district of Athens.
