= 1909–10 Maltese Premier League =

Maltese First Division
- Season: 1909–10
- Champions: Floriana (1st title)
- Matches played: 8
- Goals scored: 22 (2.75 per match)
- Top goalscorer: Salvu Samuele (4 goals)

The 1909–10 Maltese First Division was the first edition of the Maltese First Division, the precursor of today's Premier League.

== Overview ==
Following numerous attempts to organise a local football competition and the ever-increasing interest in the game, on 26 October 1907 the Lyceum Football ground was inaugurated in Marsa. This was to host the first football league campaign contested by Maltese teams and selections from the military service; the Royal Malta Artillery selection won the competition. This led to the set up of the first league season with all games to be played at the Lyceum Ground.

A total of five teams joined the league and the stipulation was that each team had to provide their own goalposts and nets. The league ended with a two-way tussle between Floriana and Sliema Wanderers, after the latter were awarded a 2–1 win over St. Joseph's United following crowd trouble. In the decider game played on 24 April 1910, Floriana triumphed with a single goal from top scorer Salvu Samuele thereby winning the first edition and being awarded the Daily Malta Chronicle Cup, a cup specifically designed for the occasion.

Locations of the 1909–10 Maltese First Division teams

== League table ==
Pos	Team	Pld	W	D	L	GF	GA	GD	Pts
1	Floriana (C)	4	4	0	0	6	0	+6	8
2	Sliema Wanderers	4	2	1	1	5	2	+3	5
3	St. Joseph's United	4	2	0	2	4	4	0	4
4	Boys Empire League	4	1	1	2	7	4	+3	3
5	Malta University	4	0	0	4	0	12	−12	0

Source: RSSSF
Rules for classification: 1) points;
(C) Champions

== Results ==
Home \ Away	FRN	SLM	SJU	BEL	MUN
Floriana	—	1–0	w/o	1–0	4–0
Sliema Wanderers		—	2–1 (Note: Match was abandoned at 2–1 after crowd invasion and result was kept at this score.)	0–0	3–0
St. Joseph's United			—	3–2	w/o
Boys Empire League				—	5–0
Malta University					—

Source: RSSSF

== See also ==
- 1909 in association football
- 1910 in association football
