= 1909–10 Football League =

22nd season of the Football League

The Football League
- Season: 1909–10
- Champions: Aston Villa
- Relegated: Grimsby Town
- New Team in League: Lincoln City

The 1909–10 season was the 22nd season of The Football League.

Beginning in the 1894–95 season, clubs finishing level on points were separated according to goal average (goals scored divided by goals conceded). In case one or more teams had the same goal difference, this system favoured those teams who had scored fewer goals. The goal average system was eventually scrapped beginning with the 1976–77 season.

During the first six seasons of the league, (up to the 1893–94 season), re-election process concerned the clubs that finished in the bottom four of the league. From the 1894–95 season and until the 1920–21 season, the re-election process was required for the clubs that finished in the bottom three of the league.

== First Division ==
First Division
- Season: 1909–10
- Champions: Aston Villa; 6th English title
- Relegated: Chelsea; Bolton Wanderers
- Matches: 380
- Goals: 1,194 (3.14 per match)
- Top goalscorer: Jack Parkinson (30 goals)
- Biggest home win: Blackburn Rovers 7–0 Woolwich Arsenal (2 October 1909)
- Biggest away win: Middlesbrough 0–5 Bury (12 February 1910)
- Highest scoring: Liverpool 6–5 Newcastle United (4 December 1910)

Pos	Team	Pld	W	D	L	GF	GA	GAv	Pts	Relegation
1	Aston Villa (C)	38	23	7	8	84	42	2.000	53	
2	Liverpool	38	21	6	11	78	57	1.368	48	
3	Blackburn Rovers	38	18	9	11	73	55	1.327	45	
4	Newcastle United	38	19	7	12	70	56	1.250	45	
5	Manchester United	38	19	7	12	69	61	1.131	45	
6	Sheffield United	38	16	10	12	62	41	1.512	42	
7	Bradford City	38	17	8	13	64	47	1.362	42	
8	Sunderland	38	18	5	15	66	51	1.294	41	
9	Notts County	38	15	10	13	67	59	1.136	40	
10	Everton	38	16	8	14	51	56	0.911	40	
11	The Wednesday	38	15	9	14	60	63	0.952	39	
12	Preston North End	38	15	5	18	52	58	0.897	35	
13	Bury	38	12	9	17	62	66	0.939	33	
14	Nottingham Forest	38	11	11	16	54	72	0.750	33	
15	Tottenham Hotspur	38	11	10	17	53	69	0.768	32	
16	Bristol City	38	12	8	18	45	60	0.750	32	
17	Middlesbrough	38	11	9	18	56	73	0.767	31	
18	Woolwich Arsenal	38	11	9	18	37	67	0.552	31	
19	Chelsea (R)	38	11	7	20	47	70	0.671	29	Relegation to the Second Division
20	Bolton Wanderers (R)	38	9	6	23	44	71	0.620	24	Relegation to the Second Division

Source: World Football
Rules for classification: 1) Points; 2) Goal average; 3) Goals scored
(C) Champions; (R) Relegated

=== Results ===
Home \ Away	AST	BLB	BOL	BRA	BRI	BRY	CHE	EVE	LIV	MUN	MID	NEW	NOT	NTC	PNE	SHU	SUN	TOT	WED	WOO
Aston Villa		4–3	3–1	3–1	1–0	4–1	4–1	3–1	3–1	7–1	4–2	4–0	0–0	1–1	3–0	2–1	3–2	3–2	5–0	5–1
Blackburn Rovers	3–2		4–2	2–0	5–2	5–1	1–0	2–1	1–1	3–2	1–1	2–0	2–2	2–0	2–2	3–1	0–0	2–0	0–0	7–0
Bolton Wanderers	1–2	1–2		1–1	4–2	1–3	5–2	0–1	1–2	2–3	1–1	0–4	2–1	3–4	3–1	1–0	2–1	0–2	0–2	3–0
Bradford City	1–2	2–0	1–0		3–1	0–0	4–1	2–0	1–2	0–2	4–1	3–3	1–1	2–1	2–0	2–0	3–1	5–1	2–0	0–1
Bristol City	0–0	2–2	1–0	2–0		1–1	1–0	3–1	0–1	2–1	4–1	0–3	4–0	3–1	2–0	0–2	2–3	0–0	1–1	0–1
Bury	0–2	2–1	1–2	3–4	1–2		4–2	2–2	1–2	1–1	2–1	1–2	4–1	1–1	3–1	2–0	0–1	3–1	3–2	1–2
Chelsea	0–0	3–1	3–2	0–3	4–1	2–0		0–1	2–1	1–1	2–1	2–1	0–1	2–2	2–0	2–2	1–4	2–1	4–1	0–1
Everton	0–0	0–2	3–1	1–1	1–0	3–0	2–2		2–3	3–3	1–1	1–4	0–4	2–0	2–1	1–2	2–1	4–2	1–1	1–0
Liverpool	2–0	3–1	3–0	1–0	0–1	2–2	5–1	0–1		3–2	0–0	6–5	7–3	2–1	2–0	0–0	1–4	2–0	3–1	5–1
Manchester United	2–0	2–0	5–0	1–0	2–1	2–0	2–0	3–2	3–4		4–1	1–1	2–6	2–1	1–1	1–0	2–0	5–0	0–3	1–0
Middlesbrough	3–2	1–3	1–2	3–7	0–0	0–5	0–1	1–1	2–2	1–2		1–1	2–1	2–0	1–0	0–2	3–2	4–3	4–0	5–2
Newcastle United	1–0	4–1	1–0	1–0	3–1	2–2	1–0	1–2	1–3	3–4	2–0		1–2	1–3	5–2	0–0	1–0	1–0	3–1	1–1
Nottingham Forest	1–4	0–4	2–0	1–1	0–0	3–3	0–0	1–0	1–4	2–0	0–1	0–1		2–1	0–0	2–3	1–3	2–2	0–6	1–1
Notts County	2–3	2–2	0–0	3–2	0–2	3–1	2–1	2–3	3–1	3–2	2–1	2–2	4–1		3–1	1–2	1–1	3–0	0–0	5–1
Preston North End	1–0	3–2	1–0	2–2	3–0	2–1	2–0	0–1	2–0	1–0	1–0	4–0	0–1	4–0		1–1	1–0	4–1	1–0	3–4
Sheffield United	0–1	3–0	2–2	1–2	4–0	2–0	0–0	3–0	4–2	0–1	2–0	4–0	1–4	2–2	5–1		3–0	1–1	3–3	2–0
Sunderland	1–1	0–0	3–0	3–0	4–0	2–3	4–0	0–1	2–1	3–0	2–2	0–2	2–1	0–3	2–1	1–0		3–1	2–0	6–2
Tottenham Hotspur	1–1	4–0	1–1	0–0	3–2	1–0	2–1	3–0	1–0	2–2	1–3	0–4	2–2	1–3	2–1	2–1	5–1		3–0	1–1
The Wednesday	3–2	2–1	0–0	2–1	2–0	1–4	4–1	1–3	3–0	4–1	1–5	3–1	4–3	0–0	4–1	1–3	1–0	1–1		1–1
Woolwich Arsenal	1–0	0–1	2–0	0–1	2–2	0–0	3–2	1–0	1–1	0–0	3–0	0–3	0–1	1–2	1–3	0–0	1–2	1–0	0–1	

Updated to match(es) played on unknown. Source:
Legend: Blue = home team win; Yellow = draw; Red = away team win.

=== Maps ===
Locations of the Football League First Division London teams
Locations of the Football League First Division teams

== Second Division ==
Football League Second Division
- Season: 1909–10
- Champions: Manchester City (3rd title)
- Failed re-election: Grimsby Town
- Matches: 380
- Goals: 1,166 (3.07 per match)
- Top goalscorer: John Smith (Hull City), 32
- Biggest home win: Leicester Fosse – Gainsborough Trinity 9–1 (27 December 1909)
- Biggest away win: Leeds City – Barnsley 0–7 (23 October 1909)
- Highest scoring: Leicester Fosse – Gainsborough Trinity 9–1 (27 December 1909)

Pos	Team	Pld	W	D	L	GF	GA	GAv	Pts	Promotion or relegation
1	Manchester City (C, P)	38	23	8	7	81	40	2.025	54	Promotion to the First Division
2	Oldham Athletic (P)	38	23	7	8	79	39	2.026	53	Promotion to the First Division
3	Hull City	38	23	7	8	80	46	1.739	53	
4	Derby County	38	22	9	7	72	47	1.532	53	
5	Leicester Fosse	38	20	4	14	79	58	1.362	44	
6	Glossop	38	18	7	13	64	57	1.123	43	
7	Fulham	38	14	13	11	51	43	1.186	41	
8	Wolverhampton Wanderers	38	17	6	15	64	63	1.016	40	
9	Barnsley	38	16	7	15	62	59	1.051	39	
10	Bradford (Park Avenue)	38	17	4	17	64	59	1.085	38	
11	West Bromwich Albion	38	16	5	17	58	56	1.036	37	
12	Blackpool	38	14	8	16	50	52	0.962	36	
13	Stockport County	38	13	8	17	50	47	1.064	34	
14	Burnley	38	14	6	18	62	61	1.016	34	
15	Lincoln City	38	10	11	17	42	69	0.609	31	
16	Clapton Orient	38	12	6	20	37	60	0.617	30	
17	Leeds City	38	10	7	21	46	80	0.575	27	
18	Gainsborough Trinity	38	10	6	22	33	75	0.440	26	
19	Grimsby Town (R)	38	9	6	23	50	77	0.649	24	Failed re-election and demoted
20	Birmingham	38	8	7	23	42	78	0.538	23	Re-elected

(C) Champions; (P) Promoted; (R) Relegated

=== Results ===
Home \ Away	BAR	BIR	BLP	BPA	BUR	CLA	DER	FUL	GAI	GLP	GRI	HUL	LEE	LEI	LIN	MCI	OLD	STP	WBA	WOL
Barnsley		5–1	1–0	4–0	0–0	2–1	5–1	2–1	4–1	3–0	2–1	1–2	1–1	3–1	2–1	1–1	2–1	1–0	2–1	7–1
Birmingham	2–1		1–2	0–1	2–1	1–2	1–3	1–1	5–0	2–2	2–4	0–2	1–2	2–1	1–0	1–1	2–2	3–0	0–1	1–0
Blackpool	0–0	2–0		0–0	2–3	2–2	1–1	1–1	0–2	1–1	1–0	1–2	3–1	0–1	3–0	0–0	1–3	2–0	2–1	2–0
Bradford Park Avenue	2–0	5–0	2–1		3–1	3–1	1–2	3–0	2–0	3–3	6–1	0–1	4–2	1–3	4–0	2–0	1–6	2–4	1–0	2–3
Burnley	2–0	2–0	5–1	1–0		2–0	1–2	2–0	2–1	0–1	3–1	0–1	3–0	5–2	3–0	3–3	1–2	2–2	2–3	4–2
Clapton Orient	4–0	3–0	2–1	1–0	2–1		0–2	0–0	2–0	0–0	0–0	0–0	0–2	3–0	1–2	3–2	1–2	2–0	1–3	1–0
Derby County	2–1	3–1	2–1	1–2	5–2	1–0		3–1	2–2	2–1	6–0	4–0	1–0	0–1	2–0	3–1	1–1	1–0	2–1	5–0
Fulham	3–0	0–0	0–1	3–1	2–1	0–0	0–0		0–1	2–0	3–2	3–1	5–1	2–0	1–1	1–1	1–1	2–0	0–2	0–0
Gainsborough Trinity	0–0	1–0	3–1	3–1	2–0	0–1	2–4	2–0		1–3	1–1	0–1	2–0	0–1	0–0	1–3	0–2	1–0	3–1	0–2
Glossop	3–0	4–1	2–3	3–1	2–0	3–1	1–1	0–1	4–0		3–0	2–1	2–1	1–0	0–1	0–3	6–2	1–0	3–2	2–0
Grimsby Town	7–0	0–2	0–1	0–1	5–3	2–0	1–1	0–2	2–1	4–0		2–3	3–1	0–0	1–2	0–1	0–0	0–1	3–0	1–0
Hull City	1–0	7–0	1–2	2–1	3–2	3–0	0–0	3–2	5–1	4–2	5–1		3–1	2–1	0–0	1–2	4–0	1–1	5–1	2–2
Leeds City	0–7	2–1	3–2	2–3	1–0	2–1	2–1	2–2	0–0	1–2	3–1	1–1		1–1	5–0	1–3	3–5	0–2	0–1	1–0
Leicester Fosse	1–1	3–1	3–2	3–0	1–1	4–0	6–0	2–3	9–1	3–1	3–1	3–1	6–2		4–1	1–3	3–0	1–0	2–1	2–1
Lincoln City	2–1	3–2	2–2	1–1	0–0	4–0	2–3	2–2	4–0	1–2	0–0	1–3	0–0	3–1		0–2	0–2	1–0	0–3	1–0
Manchester City	0–0	3–0	1–2	3–1	4–0	2–1	2–1	3–1	3–1	3–3	2–0	3–0	3–0	2–0	6–2		0–2	2–1	3–2	6–0
Oldham Athletic	5–0	1–1	2–0	1–1	1–0	5–0	4–0	0–1	2–0	1–0	4–1	3–0	2–1	2–1	6–1	1–0		3–0	1–2	3–0
Stockport County	5–0	1–1	2–0	2–1	1–1	3–0	1–1	0–2	3–0	5–0	2–1	1–5	0–0	6–2	1–1	1–2	2–0		0–2	1–1
West Bromwich Albion	4–3	3–1	0–3	1–0	1–2	3–0	0–0	3–2	5–0	0–0	4–3	0–2	3–1	1–2	1–1	0–0	1–1	0–1		0–1
Wolverhampton Wanderers	1–0	4–2	2–1	0–2	3–1	3–1	2–3	1–1	0–0	3–1	8–1	2–2	5–0	4–1	4–2	3–2	1–0	2–1	3–1	

Updated to match(es) played on unknown. Source: Ian Laschke: Rothmans Book of Football League Records 1888–89 to 1978–79. Macdonald and Jane’s, London & Sydney, 1980.
Legend: Blue = home team win; Yellow = draw; Red = away team win.

=== Maps ===
Locations of the Football League Second Division London teams
Locations of the Football League Second Division teams

== Attendances ==
=== Division One ===
No.	Club	Average
1	Chelsea FC	28,545
2	Tottenham Hotspur FC	27,560
3	Newcastle United FC	24,825
4	Liverpool FC	21,620
5	Aston Villa FC	21,125
6	Bradford City AFC	20,640
7	Everton FC	19,110
8	Manchester United	18,740
9	Sheffield United FC	13,840
10	Blackburn Rovers FC	13,805
11	Bolton Wanderers FC	12,445
12	Sunderland AFC	11,615
13	Middlesbrough FC	11,230
14	Bristol City FC	10,990
15	The Wednesday	10,720
16	Woolwich Arsenal	10,395
17	Notts County FC	10,250
18	Nottingham Forest FC	10,010
19	Bury FC	9,790
20	Preston North End FC	9,110

== See also ==
- 1909–10 in English football
- 1909 in association football
- 1910 in association football
