= Elpis Hospital =

General Hospital of Athens "Elpis" Γενικό Νοσοκομείο Αθηνών "Η Ελπίς"

Geography
- Location: Athens, Attica, Greece

Organisation
- Care system: Publicly funded health care
- Type: Clinical

Services
- Emergency department: Yes
- Beds: 260

History
- Founded: 1842; 184 years ago

Links
- Lists: Hospitals in Greece

The General Hospital of Athens "Elpis" is a hospital in the center of Athens, Greece. It is the oldest active hospital in the country.

The foundation stone of the Municipal Hospital of Athens "Elpis" was laid in June 1836 at 50 Akadimias Street, where today the Spiritual Center of the Municipality of Athens is housed. The plans were by the German architect F. Stauffert, with some modifications by his compatriot Eduard Schaubert (1804–1860). The construction was undertaken by the Danish architect Christian Hansen, making some additional modifications. The central part of the building was completed in 1842, through the support of fundraisers and donations from King Ludwig of Bavaria (Otto's father), the Duchess of Plaisance and many other Greeks such as Konstantinos Bellios, Alexandros Mavrokordatos, Konstantinos Galatis, Rallou Mourouzi and others.

It operated on Akadimias Street until 1971 when it moved to its current premises, on Dimitsanas Street in Ampelokoipoi, just behind the refugee camps on Alexandra Avenue. A relocation that was considered as far back as 1892 and was initially attempted in June 1904, with the foundation stone of the new hospital building being laid on the then municipal plot of Ampelokoipoi. However, the relocation to the new building will take place about 70 years later as it will be used initially by the Hellenic Red Cross for the care of the wounded of the Balkan Wars and then handed over to the Ministry of Defense.

In the hospital many figures of the medical science of Greece started their medical careers who later participated in the establishment of many of the newest hospitals in Athens, such as Theodoros Aretaios, Spyridon Magginas, Nikolaos Makkas, Marinos Geroulanos, Alivizatos and others. He treated, among others, the wounded of the 1893 war, the Thessalian and Cretan refugees, the wounded of the Balkan Wars, the Asia Minor refugees, the soldiers of the Greco-Italian War and the Athenians during the famine of the occupation.

It has been part of the National Health System since 1983.
