= 1926–27 FCA Championship =

5th season of FCA Championship

Football Clubs Association
- Season: 1926–27
- Champions: Panathinaikos (Athens); Olympiacos (Piraeus); Iraklis (Macedonia)
- Relegated: none (Athens) none (Piraeus) none (Macedonia)

Statistics of Football Clubs Association Championship in the 1926–27 season.

== Athens Football Clubs Association ==
=== Qualification round ===
It began on 28 November 1926 and ended on 13 February 1927.

Pos	Team	Pld	W	D	L	GF	GA	GD	Pts	Qualification	AEK	PAO	ATR	APOL	GDI	ATH	ARM
1	AEK Athens (Q)	6	4	2	0	16	7	+9	10	Final Round		—	4–2	1–1	3–1	2–0	4–1
2	Panathinaikos (Q)	5	3	2	0	18	6	+12	8	Final Round	2–2		3–0	2–1	—	8–1	2–0
3	Atromitos (Q)	6	3	1	2	17	11	+6	7	Final Round	—	—		6–0	4–2	5–2	—
4	Apollon Athens (Q)	6	2	3	1	11	13	−2	7	Final Round	—	—	—		3–1	―	3–1
5	Goudi Athens	5	1	1	3	9	12	−3	3		—	—	—	—		4–1	1–1
6	Athinaikos	6	1	1	4	9	21	−12	3		—	—	—	1–1	—		4–1
7	Armeniki Enosis (R)	6	0	2	4	4	14	−10	2		—	—	0–0	—	—	—	

Source: rsssf
(Q) Qualified for the phase indicated; (R) Relegated

=== Final round ===
It began on 27 February and ended on 8 May 1927.

Pos	Team	Pld	W	D	L	GF	GA	GD	Pts	Qualification	PAO	AEK	APOL	ATR
1	Panathinaikos (Note: A play-off round took place to decide the champion.) (Q)	3	2	1	0	10	4	+6	5	Championship play-offs		1–1	4–2	5–1
2	AEK Athens (Q)	3	2	1	0	7	1	+6	5	Championship play-offs	—		2–0	4–0
3	Apollon Athens	2	0	0	2	2	6	−4	0		—	—		— (Note: Not played)
4	Atromitos	2	0	0	2	1	9	−8	0		—	—	—	

Source: rsssf
(Q) Qualified for the phase indicated

=== Championship play-offs ===
5 June 1927
Final

Panathinaikos	1–1	AEK Athens
Zareh		Negrepontis

Leoforos Alexandras Stadium, Ampelokipoi
Referee: Jan Kopřiva
19 June 1927
17:00 EET
Replay

Panathinaikos	1–0	AEK Athens
Papadopoulos

Leoforos Alexandras Stadium, Ampelokipoi
Referee: Jan Kopřiva

Panathinaikos won the Athenian championship.

==== Top scorers ====
Rank	Player	Club	Goals
1	(Greece) Kostas Negrepontis	AEK Athens	7
2	(Greece) Rigopoulos	Atromitos	5
3	(Greece) Ilias Iliaskos	AEK Athens	4
3	(Greece) Kalomvounis	Atromitos	4
3	(Greece) Stathopoulos	Atromitos	4
6	(Greece) Stamatopoulos	Atromitos	3
6	(Greece) Fanis Asprogerakas	Panathinaikos	3
6	(Greece) Lazaros Sidiropoulos	Panathinaikos	3
6	(Greece) A. Kampouropoulos	Apollon Athens	3
10	(Greece) Sotiris Asprogerakas	Panathinaikos	2
10	(Greece) Manak Armash	AEK Athens	2
12	(Greece) Thanasis Aravositas	Panathinaikos	1
12	(Greece) Stavros Georgiadis	Panathinaikos	1
12	(Armenia) Zareh Minasyan	Panathinaikos	1
12	(Greece) Apostolos Nikolaidis	Panathinaikos	1
12	(Greece) Michalis Papadopoulos	Panathinaikos	1
12	(Greece) Andreas Viglatzis	Apollon Athens	1
12	(Greece) Giorgos Chaniotis	Apollon Athens	1
12	(Greece) Charalampos Mavrommatis	Apollon Athens	1
12	(Greece) Skiadas	Goudi	1
12	(Greece) Tsipourlianos	Atromitos	1
12	(Greece) Kargiotakis	AEK Athens	1

== Piraeus Football Clubs Association ==
Pos	Team	Qualification
1	Olympiacos (Q)	Championship play-off
2	Ethnikos Piraeus (Q)	Championship play-off
3	Falirikos Syndesmos	
4	Falirki Enosis	
5	G.S. Iraklis	
6	Kallithaikos	
7	Proodeftiki	
8	Enosi Filathlon Neapolis	
9	Titan-Panpiraikos	

Championship play-off
Team 1	Score	Team 2
Olympiacos	4–2^{*}	Ethnikos Piraeus

Replay
Team 1	Score	Team 2
Olympiacos	1–0	Ethnikos Piraeus

Olympiacos won the Piraeus' championship.

^{*}Initially, the match was scheduled for 12 June 1927 at Panathinaikos' Stadium, but because Panathinaikos wanted to play their postponed match with AEK Athens for the Athenian championship final, the match was eventually held at Panellinios' Stadium, where Olympiacos won by 4–2. However, because the fight was delayed to end due to incidents, the Piraeus' association set a rematch initially on 10 July and then its next decision was to postpone it to September. Eventually the match was decided to take place on 17 July at Panathinaikos' Stadium, where Olympiakos won by 1–0.

== Macedonia Football Clubs Association ==
Pos	Team	Pld	W	D	L	GF	GA	GD	Pts	IRA	ATL	ARIS	THER
1	Iraklis (C)	6	5	1	0	19	6	+13	11		1–1	3–1	5–1
2	Atlantas Thessaloniki	6	3	1	2	10	12	−2	7	1–6		1–4	4–0
3	Aris	6	3	0	3	24	9	+15	6	1–2	0–1		8–0
4	Thermaikos	6	0	0	6	5	31	−26	0	1–1	2–10	1–2	

Source: rsssf
(C) Champions
