= 1909–10 in English football =

Football in England
- Season: 1909–10

The 1909–10 season was the 39th season of competitive football in England.

== Events ==
Aston Villa won their sixth top division title.

Lincoln City were re-admitted to the Football League after a season away, at the expense of Chesterfield.

== Honours ==
Competition	Winner
First Division	Aston Villa (6th)
Second Division	Manchester City
FA Cup	Newcastle United (1st)
Charity Shield	Newcastle United
Home Championship	Scotland

Notes = Number in parentheses is the times that club has won that honour. * indicates new record for competition

== League tables ==
=== First Division ===
Pos	Team	Pld	W	D	L	GF	GA	GAv	Pts	Relegation
1	Aston Villa (C)	38	23	7	8	84	42	2.000	53	
2	Liverpool	38	21	6	11	78	57	1.368	48	
3	Blackburn Rovers	38	18	9	11	73	55	1.327	45	
4	Newcastle United	38	19	7	12	70	56	1.250	45	
5	Manchester United	38	19	7	12	69	61	1.131	45	
6	Sheffield United	38	16	10	12	62	41	1.512	42	
7	Bradford City	38	17	8	13	64	47	1.362	42	
8	Sunderland	38	18	5	15	66	51	1.294	41	
9	Notts County	38	15	10	13	67	59	1.136	40	
10	Everton	38	16	8	14	51	56	0.911	40	
11	The Wednesday	38	15	9	14	60	63	0.952	39	
12	Preston North End	38	15	5	18	52	58	0.897	35	
13	Bury	38	12	9	17	62	66	0.939	33	
14	Nottingham Forest	38	11	11	16	54	72	0.750	33	
15	Tottenham Hotspur	38	11	10	17	53	69	0.768	32	
16	Bristol City	38	12	8	18	45	60	0.750	32	
17	Middlesbrough	38	11	9	18	56	73	0.767	31	
18	Woolwich Arsenal	38	11	9	18	37	67	0.552	31	
19	Chelsea (R)	38	11	7	20	47	70	0.671	29	Relegation to the Second Division
20	Bolton Wanderers (R)	38	9	6	23	44	71	0.620	24	Relegation to the Second Division

Source: World Football
Rules for classification: 1) Points; 2) Goal average; 3) Goals scored
(C) Champions; (R) Relegated

=== Second Division ===
Pos	Team	Pld	W	D	L	GF	GA	GAv	Pts	Promotion or relegation
1	Manchester City (C, P)	38	23	8	7	81	40	2.025	54	Promotion to the First Division
2	Oldham Athletic (P)	38	23	7	8	79	39	2.026	53	Promotion to the First Division
3	Hull City	38	23	7	8	80	46	1.739	53	
4	Derby County	38	22	9	7	72	47	1.532	53	
5	Leicester Fosse	38	20	4	14	79	58	1.362	44	
6	Glossop	38	18	7	13	64	57	1.123	43	
7	Fulham	38	14	13	11	51	43	1.186	41	
8	Wolverhampton Wanderers	38	17	6	15	64	63	1.016	40	
9	Barnsley	38	16	7	15	62	59	1.051	39	
10	Bradford (Park Avenue)	38	17	4	17	64	59	1.085	38	
11	West Bromwich Albion	38	16	5	17	58	56	1.036	37	
12	Blackpool	38	14	8	16	50	52	0.962	36	
13	Stockport County	38	13	8	17	50	47	1.064	34	
14	Burnley	38	14	6	18	62	61	1.016	34	
15	Lincoln City	38	10	11	17	42	69	0.609	31	
16	Clapton Orient	38	12	6	20	37	60	0.617	30	
17	Leeds City	38	10	7	21	46	80	0.575	27	
18	Gainsborough Trinity	38	10	6	22	33	75	0.440	26	
19	Grimsby Town (R)	38	9	6	23	50	77	0.649	24	Failed re-election and demoted
20	Birmingham	38	8	7	23	42	78	0.538	23	Re-elected

(C) Champions; (P) Promoted; (R) Relegated
