= 1908 in association football =

The following are the football (soccer) events of the year 1908 throughout the world.

== Winners club national championship ==
- Argentina: Belgrano(*)
- Belgium : Racing CB
- England: Manchester United
  - FA Cup: Wolves
- Finland: Unitas Helsinki
- Germany: Viktoria Berlin (winners of a regional league play-off)(*)
- Hungary: MTK(*)
- Italy: Pro Vercelli(*)
- Netherlands : Quick Den Haag(*)
- Scotland: For fuller coverage, see 1907-08 in Scottish football.
  - Scottish Division One – Celtic
  - Scottish Division Two – Raith Rovers
  - Scottish Cup – Celtic
- Sweden: IFK Gothenburg(*)
- Switzerland: FC Winterthur (winners of a play-off)(*)
- Uruguay: River Plate(*)
- Greece: F.C. Goudi Athens

(*)Amateur league

== International tournaments ==
- Torneo Internazionale Stampa Sportiva, in Turin, Italy:
  1. (Switzerland) Servette FC
  2. (Italy) Torino
- Olympic Games in London, United Kingdom (October 19 – 24 1908)
  1. (United Kingdom) Great Britain
  2. Denmark
  3. Netherlands
- 1908 British Home Championship

Shared by England and Scotland

== Clubs founded ==
- March 25 – Clube Atlético Mineiro (Brazil)
- July 19 – Feyenoord (Netherlands)
- September 26 – SK Brann (Norway)
- Hartlepool United F.C. (England)
- March 9 – F.C. Internazionale Milano (Italy)
- R.S.C. Anderlecht (Belgium)
- Huddersfield Town F.C. (England)
- Panathinaikos F.C. (Greece)
- U.S. Lecce (Italy)
- St Albans City F.C. (England)
- S.S.C. Bari (Italy)
- Real Murcia (Spain)
- FC Lugano (Switzerland)
- ŁKS Łódź (Poland)
- LASK (Austria)

== Births ==
- March 21 – Juan López Fontana, Uruguayan football manager (died 1983)
- April 20 – Pierre Korb, French international footballer (died 1980)
- June 4 – Alejandro Villanueva, Peruvian footballer (died 1944)
- June 8 – Leo Lemešić, Croatian football player and manager (died 1978)
- August 1 – William Ling, English football referee (died 1984)
- November 12 – Frank Wattam, English professional footballer (died 1984)
