= Konstantinos Bellios =

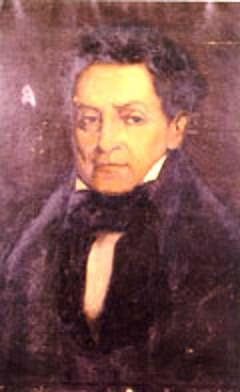
Baron Konstantinos Bellios

Baron Konstantinos Bellios or Vellios (Greek: Κωνσταντίνος Μπέλλιος/Βέλλιος, Romanian: Constantin Bellu; 7 March 1772 in Blatsi – 23 December 1838 in Vienna) was a Greek merchant and benefactor from the Ottoman Empire, the modern region of Greek Macedonia.

== Life ==
His Aromanian (Vlach) family, hailed from Linotopi. Like the other inhabitants of the village, they abandoned it in 1769, after it was destroyed by Muslim Albanian irregulars during the suppression of the Orlov Revolt. The inhabitants spread across Macedonia, but Bellios' family settled in Blatsi (modern Vlasti, Kozani Prefecture), where Bellios was born in 1772.

Konstantinos' father, Alexandros, left Blatsi for Constantinople. Konstantinos and his older brother Stefanos received their first education at Vlasti, but later left for Constantinople, where they continued their studies. In 1812, Konstantinos and Stefanos accompanied the newly appointed hospodar (ruler) of Wallachia, Ioannis Karatzas, to his province. The brothers settled at the Wallachian capital Bucharest, where Stefanos rose to become the logothete (minister) of Justice. Konstantinos Bellios acquired a thorough education at the Greek gymnasium of Iasi, and began his career in commerce and finance. Eventually, he settled in Vienna, where, on 24 February 1817, Emperor Francis I of Austria ennobled him as Baron von Bellios.

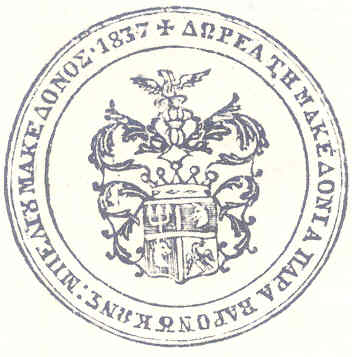
Donation seal on the books donated by Bellios to the National Library of Greece, originally intended for the Macedonian refugee settlement of Nea Pella

Following the establishment of the independent Kingdom of Greece, he spent much of his fortune in donations and beneficent works "to assist and be of use to my homeland at a time when it is beginning to rise again". His benefactions include:

- Foundation of the Elpis Hospital in Athens, the first hospital established in the country after Independence
- Foundation of the Nea Pella settlement for Macedonian refugees in Atalanti who had fled south during the Greek War of Independence. Bellios gave each of the ca. 200 families a home and ca. 4 hectares of land.
- The Velieion trust, which offered scholarships to Macedonians from Vlasti, Siatista, Kastoria, and other cities of Macedonia, as well as Nea Pella
- Fund drives in Vienna and Bucharest to raise money for schools, hospitals, etc. in Greece
- Donation of the first safe to the Greek government in 1836
- Donation of his library for use by the settlement of Nea Pella to the National Library of Greece, comprising 771 titles in 1886 volumes
- Donations to the Educational Society (Φιλεκπαιδευτική Εταιρεία) in 1837
- Donation of lands to the value of 70,000 drachmas to the Municipality of Athens

In 1836 he visited Athens, the capital of independent Greece, where he was received with honours by King Otto, who decorated him with the Order of the Redeemer. In return, Bellios gave the king an 11th-century sword, and to Queen Amalia a rare edition of Homer. He stayed in Athens for three months, from December 1836 to March 1837. During his stay, he became acquainted with Kyriakos Pittakis, director of the Greek Archaeological Service. His contact with Pittakis, and his tours of the antiquities of Athens, made a deep impression on Bellios, which led to his decision to co-found and fund the private Archaeological Society of Athens in 1837.

He died in Vienna on 3 December 1838.

== Legacy ==
Bellios was referred to as a "Macedonian compatriot" in the preamble in the first issue of their journal Loza in 1892.

== Sources ==
- Christoforou, Manthos K. (2006). Ο βαρόνος Κωνσταντίνος Δημ. Μπέλλιος ή Βέλλιος - Ευεργέτης των Μακεδόνων (in Greek). Αιάντειος Δημόσια Βιβλιοθήκη Αταλάντης.
- Dellios, Ioannis (1910). "Ο βαρώνος Κωνσταντίνος Μπέλλιος". Μακεδονικό Ημερολόγιο (in Greek). 3: 19–36.
- Kalinderis, Michail (1973). Ο βαρώνος Κωνσταντίνος Δ. Βέλιος 1772-1838, Η ζωή και η υπέρ του έθνους προσφορά του (in Greek). Society of Macedonian Studies.
- Panagiotopoulos, Vasilis P. (1964). Βαρώνος Κωνσταντίνος Μπέλλιος. Ἕνας ὁμογενὴς στὴν Ἀθήνα τοῦ 1836 (in Greek).
- Tzafettas, John; Konecny, Elvira (2015). Nikolaus Dumba (1830-1900): A Dazzling Figure in Imperial Vienna. AKAKIA Publications. ISBN 9781910714171.
- Varvarousis, Ioannis K. (2007). Ο βαρόνος Κωνσταντίνος Μπέλλιος από την Βλάστη και οι επίγονοί του (in Greek).
