= President Hotel (Athens) =

Hotel in Athens, Attica Region, Greece

- Interactive map of the President Hotel area
- Alternative names: President Hotel Athens

General information
- Location: Athens, Greece, Kifissias Avenue 43,
- Coordinates: 37.9892°N 23.7636°E
- Opening: 1978
- Owner: GEKE Hotel & Tourism Company

Height
- Height: 68 m (223 ft)

Technical details
- Floor count: 22

Design and construction
- Architect: Ioannis Vikelas

Other information
- Number of rooms: 517

Website
- https://president.gr/

President Hotel Athens is a hotel located in Ampelokipi, Athens. It is the tallest hotel in Greece with a height of 68 m and has 22 floors. Construction started in 1974 and ended in 1978. The hotel building has an area of 34,280 sq. m. It was designed by the famous Greek architect Ioannis Vikelas and it was completely renovated in 2004. On the 21st floor of the hotel there is a restaurant and bar as well as a swimming pool. Many events also happen, usually DJ gigs. The hotel also offers Breakfast Buffets, Lunch and Dinner. The hotel has a total of 517 rooms and 918 beds. It is the leading 4-star hotel of Athens regarding the room occupancy rate, with a total of 68% for 2018.

== See also ==
President Hotel Athens (February 2018)

- Hilton Athens
