= Macedonian refugees in Atalanti =

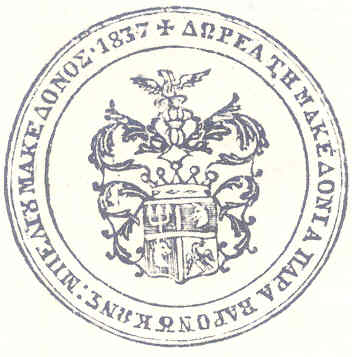
Donation seal on the books donated by Bellios to the National Library of Greece, originally intended for the Macedonian refugee settlement of Nea Pella

The Macedonian refugees in Atalanti (Greek: Μακεδόνες πρόσφυγες στην Αταλάντη) were a compact population from the Macedonia region, settled in the town of Atalanti after the failed revolution in Macedonia during the Greek War of Independence and the establishment of the independent Kingdom of Greece.

On November 5, 1826, at the port of Atalanti, arrived the "Thessalomacedonians" (Θεσσαλομακεδόνες) refugees, led by Angelis Gatsos and Anastasios Karatasos, organized with the aid of Ioannis Kolettis. In 1829, 545 Macedonian families or 2,436 people were accommodated in Skopelos.

Between February and March 1831, 150 captains with their men fled from Thessaloniki to southern parts of Greece and the government of Ioannis Kapodistrias received and accommodated them in Atalanti.

A royal decree of March 20, 1835, affirmed that 370 Macedonian refugees were granted the right to settle in Atalanti, freeing up 1.5 hectares (3 1/2 acres) of state land for cultivation and food. Subsequently, other Macedonian refugees settled in Atalanti, and all of them were granted state-owned timber for the construction of houses.

By royal decree of April 25, old style, or May 7, 1837, Macedonians were granted the right of self-government - in this case, against the existing local Greek community. This provoked protest by the mayor and as a result the formation of two parallel self-governing communities, with no analogue in the territory of the Kingdom of Greece. Immediately after the royal decree, philanthropist Konstantinos Bellios donated 2000 books to the local Macedonian library.

The district in Atalanti for the Macedonian Greeks was the former "Turkish neighborhood" (Τουρκομαχαλάς), officially renamed to Pella or "Nea Pella" (New Pella) or "Nea Pelli" (Attic form of Pella). In 1859 Simon Sinas was declared also honorable citizen of Nea Pella.

== See also ==
- Wallachian uprising of 1821
- Macedonian Question
- Macedonia naming dispute
