= Albert Curwood =

English footballer

Personal information
- Date of birth: 31 December 1910
- Place of birth: Bridgwater, England
- Date of death: 1971 (aged 70)
- Place of death: Blackpool
- Position: Centre forward

Senior career*
Years	Team	Apps	(Gls)
1933	Blackpool	0	(0)
1934	Bournemouth & Boscombe Athletic	7	(0)
1935	→ Swansea Town (loan)	0	(0)
- * Club domestic league appearances and goals

Albert Curwood (31 December 1910 – 1971) was an English professional footballer. A centre forward, he was on the books of Blackpool Blackpool (having been transferred from Llanelli F.C where he started his football), Bournemouth & Boscombe Athletic, Swansea Town , Rochdale, Halifax Town and ending his career at Fleetwood Town. His grandson Steven Curwood is the Chief Executive at Blackburn Rovers and was previously at Fleetwood Town.
