= Bob Robinson (footballer, born 1910) =

English footballer

Personal information
- Full name: Robert Robinson
- Date of birth: 27 March 1910
- Place of birth: Leamside, England
- Date of death: 22 January 1989 (aged 78)
- Place of death: Cross Hills, England
- Height: 5 ft 10 1/2 in (1.79 m)
- Position: Goalkeeper

Senior career*
Years	Team	Apps	(Gls)
1925	Lambton & Hetton		
1925	South Hetton Colliery Welfare		
1925–1926	Hebburn Colliery		
1926–1931	Sunderland	34	(0)
1931–1932	Guildford City		
1932–1934	Norwich City	34	(0)
1934–1937	Barrow	32	(0)
1937–1938	Scarborough		
1938–19??	Gainsborough Trinity		
- * Club domestic league appearances and goals

Robert Robinson (27 March 1910 – 22 January 1989) was an English professional footballer who played as a goalkeeper for Sunderland.
