= 1909 in association football =

The following are the football (soccer) events of the year 1909 throughout the world.

== Events ==
- Goalkeepers begin to wear a different coloured shirt to the rest of the team.
- During the fall, a team composed of British players tour the United States.
- 19 December: Borussia Dortmund are founded.

== Winners club national championship ==
- Germany: Phönix Karlsruhe
- Greece: Peiraikos sindesmos Pireas
- Italy: S.G. Pro Vercelli
- Scotland: For fuller coverage, see 1908-09 in Scottish football.
  - Scottish Division One – Celtic
  - Scottish Division Two – Abercorn
  - Scottish Cup – After two drawn games between Celtic and Rangers and a riot the cup was withheld.

== International tournaments ==
- 1909 British Home Championship (13 February – 3 April 1909)

England

- Sir Thomas Lipton Trophy:
  1. (England) West Auckland
  2. (Switzerland) FC Winterthur
  3. (Italy) Torino XI
  4. (Germany) Stuttgarter Sportfreunde

== Births ==
- 28 January – John Thomson, Scottish international footballer (died 1931)
- 28 March – Cyril Beach, English professional footballer (died 1980)
- 9 July – Juan Yustrich, Argentine goalkeeper (died 2002)
- 26 September – Ştefan Dobay, Romanian international footballer (died 1994)
- 16 October – Franz Krumm, German international footballer (died 1943)
- 26 December – Tom Poskett, English professional footballer (died 1972)

== Clubs founded ==
- Bologna FC 1909
- Borussia Dortmund
- Budapest Honvéd FC
- SK Sturm Graz
- Real Sociedad
- Club Sportivo Sergipe
- Coritiba Foot Ball Club
- Sport Club Internacional
