= 1910–11 Football League =

23rd season of the Football League

The Football League
- Season: 1910–11
- Champions: Manchester United
- Relegated: Lincoln City
- New Team in League: Huddersfield Town

The 1910–11 season was the 23rd season of The Football League.

== Final league tables ==
Beginning in the 1894–95 season, clubs finishing level on points were separated according to goal average (goals scored divided by goals conceded). In case one or more teams had the same goal difference, this system favoured those teams who had scored fewer goals. The goal average system was eventually scrapped beginning with the 1976–77 season.

During the first six seasons of the league, (up to the 1893–94 season), re-election process concerned the clubs which finished in the bottom four of the league. From the 1894–95 season and until the 1920–21 season the re-election process was required of the clubs which finished in the bottom three of the league.

== First Division ==
First Division
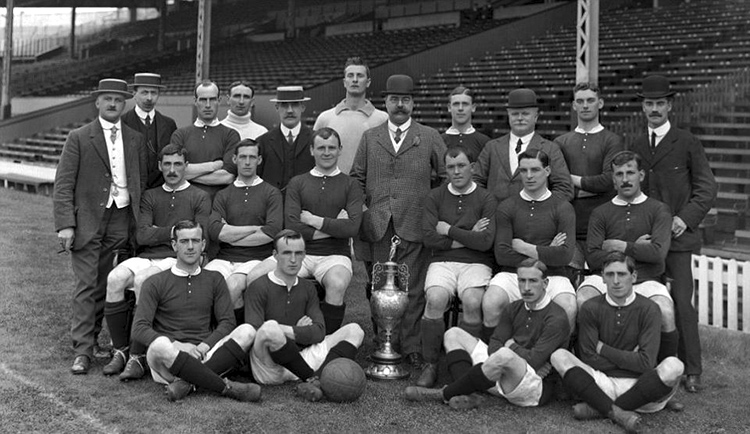
- The 1910–11 Manchester United team and staff with Football League First Division trophy
- Season: 1910–11
- Champions: Manchester United; 2nd English title
- Relegated: Bristol City; Nottingham Forest
- Matches: 380
- Goals: 1,028 (2.71 per match)
- Top goalscorer: Albert Shepherd (25 goals)
- Biggest home win: Newcastle United 6–1 Liverpool (22 Oct 1910); Everton 6–1 Blackburn Rovers (19 November 1910); Blackburn Rovers 6–1 The Wednesday (26 November 1910); Newcastle United 6–1 Bradford City (3 December 1910)
- Biggest away win: Everton 1–5 Newcastle United (2 January 1911)
- Highest scoring: Tottenham Hotspur 6–2 Middlesbrough (13 February 1911)

Pos	Team	Pld	W	D	L	GF	GA	GAv	Pts	Relegation
1	Manchester United (C)	38	22	8	8	72	40	1.800	52	
2	Aston Villa	38	22	7	9	69	41	1.683	51	
3	Sunderland	38	15	15	8	67	48	1.396	45	
4	Everton	38	19	7	12	50	36	1.389	45	
5	Bradford City	38	20	5	13	51	42	1.214	45	
6	The Wednesday	38	17	8	13	47	48	0.979	42	
7	Oldham Athletic	38	16	9	13	44	41	1.073	41	
8	Newcastle United	38	15	10	13	61	43	1.419	40	
9	Sheffield United	38	15	8	15	49	43	1.140	38	
10	Woolwich Arsenal	38	13	12	13	41	49	0.837	38	
11	Notts County	38	14	10	14	37	45	0.822	38	
12	Blackburn Rovers	38	13	11	14	62	54	1.148	37	
13	Liverpool	38	15	7	16	53	53	1.000	37	
14	Preston North End	38	12	11	15	40	49	0.816	35	
15	Tottenham Hotspur	38	13	6	19	52	63	0.825	32	
16	Middlesbrough	38	11	10	17	49	63	0.778	32	
17	Manchester City	38	9	13	16	43	58	0.741	31	
18	Bury	38	9	11	18	43	71	0.606	29	
19	Bristol City (R)	38	11	5	22	43	66	0.652	27	Relegation to the Second Division
20	Nottingham Forest (R)	38	9	7	22	55	75	0.733	25	Relegation to the Second Division

Source: World Football
Rules for classification: 1) Points; 2) Goal average; 3) Goals scored
(C) Champions; (R) Relegated

=== Results ===
Home \ Away	AST	BLB	BRA	BRI	BRY	EVE	LIV	MCI	MUN	MID	NEW	NOT	NTC	OLD	PNE	SHU	SUN	TOT	WED	WOO
Aston Villa		2–2	4–1	2–0	4–1	2–1	1–1	2–1	4–2	5–0	3–2	3–1	3–1	1–1	0–2	3–0	2–1	4–0	2–1	3–0
Blackburn Rovers	0–0		3–0	2–0	6–2	0–1	1–2	2–0	1–0	5–1	3–1	4–1	1–1	1–0	0–1	1–2	0–1	3–0	6–1	1–0
Bradford City	1–2	1–0		3–1	2–2	3–1	1–3	1–0	1–0	1–0	1–0	2–1	0–1	1–2	1–0	0–1	3–0	3–0	5–2	3–0
Bristol City	1–2	1–0	0–2		2–0	0–1	1–1	2–1	0–1	3–2	1–0	5–1	1–0	3–2	0–0	0–2	1–1	0–2	2–2	0–1
Bury	1–0	2–2	0–1	2–1		0–0	3–0	5–2	0–3	4–2	1–1	1–0	0–0	2–2	1–0	1–1	0–0	2–1	1–1	1–1
Everton	0–1	6–1	0–0	4–3	2–1		0–1	1–0	0–1	2–0	1–5	2–1	5–0	1–0	2–0	1–0	2–2	2–0	1–1	2–0
Liverpool	3–1	2–2	1–2	4–0	2–0	0–2		1–1	3–2	3–0	3–0	2–3	2–1	1–0	3–0	2–0	1–2	1–2	3–0	1–1
Manchester City	1–1	0–0	1–3	1–2	5–1	2–1	1–2		1–1	2–1	2–0	1–0	0–1	2–0	0–2	0–4	3–3	2–1	1–2	1–1
Manchester United	2–0	3–2	1–0	3–1	3–2	2–2	2–0	2–1		1–2	2–0	4–2	0–0	0–0	5–0	1–1	5–1	3–2	3–2	5–0
Middlesbrough	0–1	2–3	3–2	3–0	2–1	1–0	2–2	0–0	2–2		0–2	2–2	4–1	1–2	2–0	3–1	1–0	2–0	0–1	1–1
Newcastle United	1–0	2–2	6–1	0–1	5–1	1–0	6–1	3–3	0–1	0–0		4–1	2–0	3–0	1–1	1–1	1–1	1–1	0–2	0–1
Nottingham Forest	3–1	5–2	0–2	3–3	1–2	1–1	2–0	0–0	2–1	1–1	0–1		0–2	4–1	1–3	1–2	1–3	1–2	0–1	2–3
Notts County	1–2	2–0	1–1	2–0	1–0	0–0	1–0	0–1	1–0	1–0	2–2	1–1		1–0	3–3	0–3	1–1	1–0	2–0	0–2
Oldham Athletic	1–1	2–0	1–0	1–0	0–0	2–0	3–1	1–1	1–3	1–1	0–2	2–0	2–1		2–1	3–0	2–1	2–0	1–0	3–0
Preston North End	0–1	0–0	2–0	4–0	2–0	0–2	2–1	1–1	0–2	1–1	2–1	0–2	2–0	1–1		1–1	0–2	2–0	1–3	4–1
Sheffield United	2–1	1–1	0–1	0–4	3–0	0–1	2–0	2–2	2–0	2–1	0–0	0–1	0–2	1–2	5–0		1–2	3–0	0–1	3–2
Sunderland	3–2	2–2	1–1	3–1	4–1	4–0	4–0	4–0	1–2	3–1	2–1	2–2	1–1	2–1	1–1	0–2		4–0	1–2	2–2
Tottenham Hotspur	1–2	2–2	2–0	3–2	5–0	0–1	1–0	1–1	2–2	6–2	1–2	1–4	3–0	2–0	1–1	2–1	1–1		3–1	3–1
The Wednesday	1–0	1–0	0–1	2–1	1–0	0–2	1–0	4–1	0–0	1–1	0–2	5–2	1–3	2–0	0–0	2–0	1–1	2–1		0–0
Woolwich Arsenal	1–1	4–1	0–0	3–0	3–2	1–0	0–0	0–1	1–2	0–2	1–2	3–2	2–1	0–0	2–0	0–0	0–0	2–0	1–0	

Updated to match(es) played on unknown. Source:
Legend: Blue = home team win; Yellow = draw; Red = away team win.

=== Maps ===
Locations of the Football League First Division London teams
Locations of the Football League First Division teams

== Second Division ==
Football League Second Division
- Season: 1910–11
- Champions: West Bromwich Albion (2nd title)
- Failed re-election: Lincoln City
- Matches: 380
- Goals: 1,050 (2.76 per match)
- Top goalscorer: Bob Whittingham (Chelsea), 31
- Biggest home win: Barnsley – Bradford Park Avenue 7–0 (25 March 1911); Chelsea – Lincoln City 7–0 (29 October 1910)
- Biggest away win: Lincoln City – Wolverhampton Wanderers 1–5 (22 October 1910)
- Highest scoring: Bolton Wanderers – Leicester Fosse 6–2 (31 December 1910); Fulham – Stockport County 6–2 (4 March 1911); Burnley – Stockport County 5–3 (18 March 1911)

Pos	Team	Pld	W	D	L	GF	GA	GAv	Pts	Promotion or relegation
1	West Bromwich Albion (C, P)	38	22	9	7	67	41	1.634	53	Promotion to the First Division
2	Bolton Wanderers (P)	38	21	9	8	69	40	1.725	51	Promotion to the First Division
3	Chelsea	38	20	9	9	71	35	2.029	49	
4	Clapton Orient	38	19	7	12	44	35	1.257	45	
5	Hull City	38	14	16	8	55	39	1.410	44	
6	Derby County	38	17	8	13	73	52	1.404	42	
7	Blackpool	38	16	10	12	49	38	1.289	42	
8	Burnley	38	13	15	10	45	45	1.000	41	
9	Wolverhampton Wanderers	38	15	8	15	51	52	0.981	38	
10	Fulham	38	15	7	16	52	48	1.083	37	
11	Leeds City	38	15	7	16	58	56	1.036	37	
12	Bradford (Park Avenue)	38	14	9	15	53	55	0.964	37	
13	Huddersfield Town	38	13	8	17	57	58	0.983	34	
14	Glossop	38	13	8	17	48	62	0.774	34	
15	Leicester Fosse	38	14	5	19	52	62	0.839	33	
16	Birmingham	38	12	8	18	42	64	0.656	32	
17	Stockport County	38	11	8	19	47	79	0.595	30	
18	Gainsborough Trinity	38	9	11	18	37	55	0.673	29	
19	Barnsley	38	7	14	17	52	62	0.839	28	Re-elected
20	Lincoln City (R)	38	7	10	21	28	72	0.389	24	Failed re-election and demoted

(C) Champions; (P) Promoted; (R) Relegated

=== Results ===
Home \ Away	BAR	BIR	BLP	BOL	BPA	BUR	CHE	CLA	DER	FUL	GAI	GLP	HUD	HUL	LEE	LEI	LIN	STP	WBA	WOL
Barnsley		2–3	1–2	0–0	7–0	0–1	3–2	1–2	0–2	4–2	2–2	4–0	1–2	0–1	4–0	1–1	2–2	1–1	1–1	2–2
Birmingham	1–0		2–0	2–1	1–0	1–1	2–1	0–1	2–0	1–1	1–1	1–2	2–1	1–0	2–1	1–0	0–1	1–3	1–1	1–3
Blackpool	1–0	3–1		1–1	4–1	1–0	0–2	1–1	0–1	1–2	1–1	1–0	1–1	2–0	1–2	2–0	5–1	2–1	0–0	2–0
Bolton Wanderers	4–0	5–1	1–0		1–0	1–1	2–0	2–0	2–1	2–0	3–0	4–0	3–1	2–1	3–0	6–2	3–1	2–2	3–1	4–1
Bradford Park Avenue	2–3	2–2	1–0	1–1		1–1	2–1	3–0	2–1	1–0	5–0	6–0	0–1	2–0	0–2	3–1	6–0	3–2	3–3	1–0
Burnley	0–0	2–2	1–1	1–3	1–1		1–1	2–0	2–1	1–0	1–1	0–0	2–1	0–0	4–1	2–1	3–1	5–3	2–0	1–1
Chelsea	3–1	2–2	0–0	3–0	3–0	3–0		1–0	3–2	2–0	3–0	2–0	2–0	2–0	4–1	2–0	7–0	2–0	2–1	2–0
Clapton Orient	3–0	2–1	2–1	0–0	1–0	0–2	0–0		1–0	1–0	1–0	4–0	2–0	1–1	1–0	3–1	2–0	1–0	0–0	3–1
Derby County	5–1	1–0	1–1	2–2	4–2	3–0	1–4	3–1		2–2	4–0	2–1	1–1	2–3	2–2	3–0	5–0	4–1	1–3	2–0
Fulham	0–2	3–0	2–1	2–0	4–0	3–0	1–0	1–1	3–1		1–0	2–2	2–1	0–1	2–1	3–1	0–0	6–2	0–1	0–1
Gainsborough Trinity	1–1	1–0	2–0	1–0	1–2	1–2	3–1	3–1	0–0	0–1		3–0	3–1	1–1	1–2	2–0	1–0	0–0	1–1	1–3
Glossop	1–1	2–1	3–1	1–2	0–1	1–1	2–1	1–3	2–2	2–1	3–1		5–2	0–0	2–1	1–0	2–0	3–0	0–2	5–1
Huddersfield Town	2–0	7–1	2–2	1–1	0–0	0–1	3–1	2–0	0–3	1–2	2–1	1–0		2–0	3–2	1–2	1–1	4–1	0–2	3–1
Hull City	5–1	4–1	1–1	1–1	2–2	3–0	1–1	1–2	2–0	0–0	3–2	1–0	2–2		1–1	2–2	2–1	4–1	1–1	2–2
Leeds City	0–0	1–1	1–2	1–0	2–0	0–0	3–3	1–0	3–2	3–1	4–0	0–2	5–2	1–0		2–3	0–1	4–0	3–1	1–0
Leicester Fosse	1–1	2–0	2–0	5–0	2–0	1–1	1–0	2–1	1–2	3–2	1–0	1–1	2–1	0–2	2–1		2–0	5–1	2–3	2–3
Lincoln City	1–0	0–1	0–1	1–3	0–0	1–0	0–0	0–0	0–2	1–0	0–0	2–2	2–2	1–4	1–1	2–0		2–0	1–2	1–5
Stockport County	2–2	3–1	1–3	0–1	1–0	4–2	2–2	0–3	3–2	1–1	1–0	2–1	1–0	1–1	0–4	1–0	3–2		0–1	1–0
West Bromwich Albion	3–3	1–0	0–1	2–0	3–0	2–1	1–3	3–0	1–1	2–1	2–1	3–1	1–0	0–2	2–0	5–1	3–0	4–2		2–1
Wolverhampton Wanderers	1–0	3–1	0–3	3–0	0–0	1–0	0–0	1–0	1–2	5–1	1–1	2–0	0–3	0–0	3–1	1–0	2–1	0–0	2–3	

Updated to match(es) played on unknown. Source: Ian Laschke: Rothmans Book of Football League Records 1888–89 to 1978–79. Macdonald and Jane’s, London & Sydney, 1980.
Legend: Blue = home team win; Yellow = draw; Red = away team win.

=== Maps ===
Locations of the Football League Second Division London teams
Locations of the Football League Second Division teams

== Attendances ==
=== Division One ===
No.	Club	Average
1	Newcastle United FC	25,055
2	Manchester City FC	24,955
3	Manchester United	24,190
4	Tottenham Hotspur FC	23,155
5	Aston Villa FC	22,705
6	Everton FC	18,860
7	Liverpool FC	16,825
8	Bradford City AFC	16,780
9	Sunderland AFC	16,650
10	Middlesbrough FC	15,955
11	Blackburn Rovers FC	14,350
12	Oldham Athletic FC	14,155
13	Notts County FC	12,750
14	Sheffield United FC	12,595
15	The Wednesday	11,890
16	Woolwich Arsenal	11,525
17	Bristol City FC	11,025
18	Nottingham Forest FC	10,360
19	Bury FC	10,210
20	Preston North End FC	9,080

== See also ==
- 1910–11 in English football
- 1910 in association football
- 1911 in association football
