= Frank Wattam =

English footballer

Personal information
- Full name: Frank Wattam
- Date of birth: 12 November 1908
- Place of birth: Grimsby, England
- Date of death: 1984 (aged 75–76)
- Height: 5 ft 10 in (1.78 m)
- Position: Wing half

Senior career*
Years	Team	Apps	(Gls)
1924–1925	Grimsby YMCA		
1925–1926	Grimsby Albion		
1926–1927	Cleethorpes Town		
1927–1928	Louth Town		
1928–1939	Grimsby Town	27	(0)
- * Club domestic league appearances and goals

Frank Wattam (12 November 1908 – 1984) was an English professional footballer who played as a wing half.
