= Danny Edgar =

English footballer

Personal information
- Full name: Daniel Edgar
- Date of birth: 3 April 1910
- Place of birth: Jarrow, England
- Date of death: 23 March 1991 (aged 80)
- Place of death: Jarrow, England
- Height: 5 ft 11 in (1.80 m)
- Position: Full-back

Youth career
- Jarrow St Bede's

Senior career*
Years	Team	Apps	(Gls)
1930	Sunderland	0	(0)
1930–1931	Walsall	9	(0)
1931–1935	Sunderland	43	(0)
1935–1938	Nottingham Forest	100	(1)
- * Club domestic league appearances and goals

Daniel Edgar (3 April 1910 – 23 March 1991) was an English professional footballer who played as a full-back for Sunderland.
