= Cyril Beach =

English footballer (1909–1980)

Personal information
- Full name: Cyril Howard Beach
- Date of birth: 28 March 1909
- Place of birth: Chilvers Coton, Nuneaton, England
- Date of death: 22 August 1980 (aged 71)
- Place of death: Auckland, New Zealand
- Height: 5 ft 9 1/2 in (1.77 m)
- Position: Inside forward

Youth career
- 1927–1929: Hounslow

Senior career*
Years	Team	Apps	(Gls)
1929–1932	Charlton Athletic	29	(4)
1932–1933	Sunderland	3	(0)
1933–1935	Hayesco		
1935–1936	Peterborough United		
- * Club domestic league appearances and goals

Cyril Howard Beach (28 March 1909 – 22 August 1980) was an English professional footballer who played as an inside forward for Charlton Athletic and Sunderland.

Beach moved to New Zealand with his parents. He died in Auckland in 1980.
