= 1910 SEGAS Championship =

5th season of SEGAS Championship

SEGAS Championship
- Season: 1910
- Champions: Goudi Athens

The 1910 SEGAS Championship was the fifth championship organized by SEGAS.

== Overview ==
Goudi Athens won the championship.

== Teams ==
Pos	Team
1	Goudi Athens (C)
2	Peiraikos Syndesmos
	Ethnikos G.S. Athens
	University of Athens team
	Evelpidon team
	Hellenic Naval Academy team
