= Tom Poskett =

English footballer

Personal information
- Full name: Thomas William Poskett
- Date of birth: 26 December 1909
- Place of birth: Esh Winning, England
- Date of death: 19 December 1972 (aged 62)
- Height: 6 ft 0 in (1.83 m)
- Position: Goalkeeper

Senior career*
Years	Team	Apps	(Gls)
1926–1927	Chopwell Institute		
1927–1928	Crook Town		
1928–1932	Grimsby Town	2	(0)
1932–1934	Lincoln City	10	(0)
1934–1935	Notts County	10	(0)
1935–1937	Tranmere Rovers	22	(0)
1937–1947	Crewe Alexandra	99	(0)
1947–194?	Northwich Victoria		
- * Club domestic league appearances and goals

Thomas William Poskett (26 December 1909 – 19 December 1972) was an English professional footballer who played as a goalkeeper.
