= Raúl Alexandre =

Portuguese footballer

Personal information
- Date of birth: 22 January 1910 (age 116)
- Place of birth: Portugal
- Position: Midfielder

Senior career*
Years	Team	Apps	(Gls)
1929–1932	Vitória Setúbal		
1932–1937	Académico do Porto		

International career
1930	Portugal	1	(0)
- * Club domestic league appearances and goals

Raúl Alexandre (22 January 1910 – ?) was a Portuguese footballer who played as a midfielder.
