= Prosfygika of Alexandras avenue =

- Προσφυγικά Λεωφόρου Αλεξάνδρας
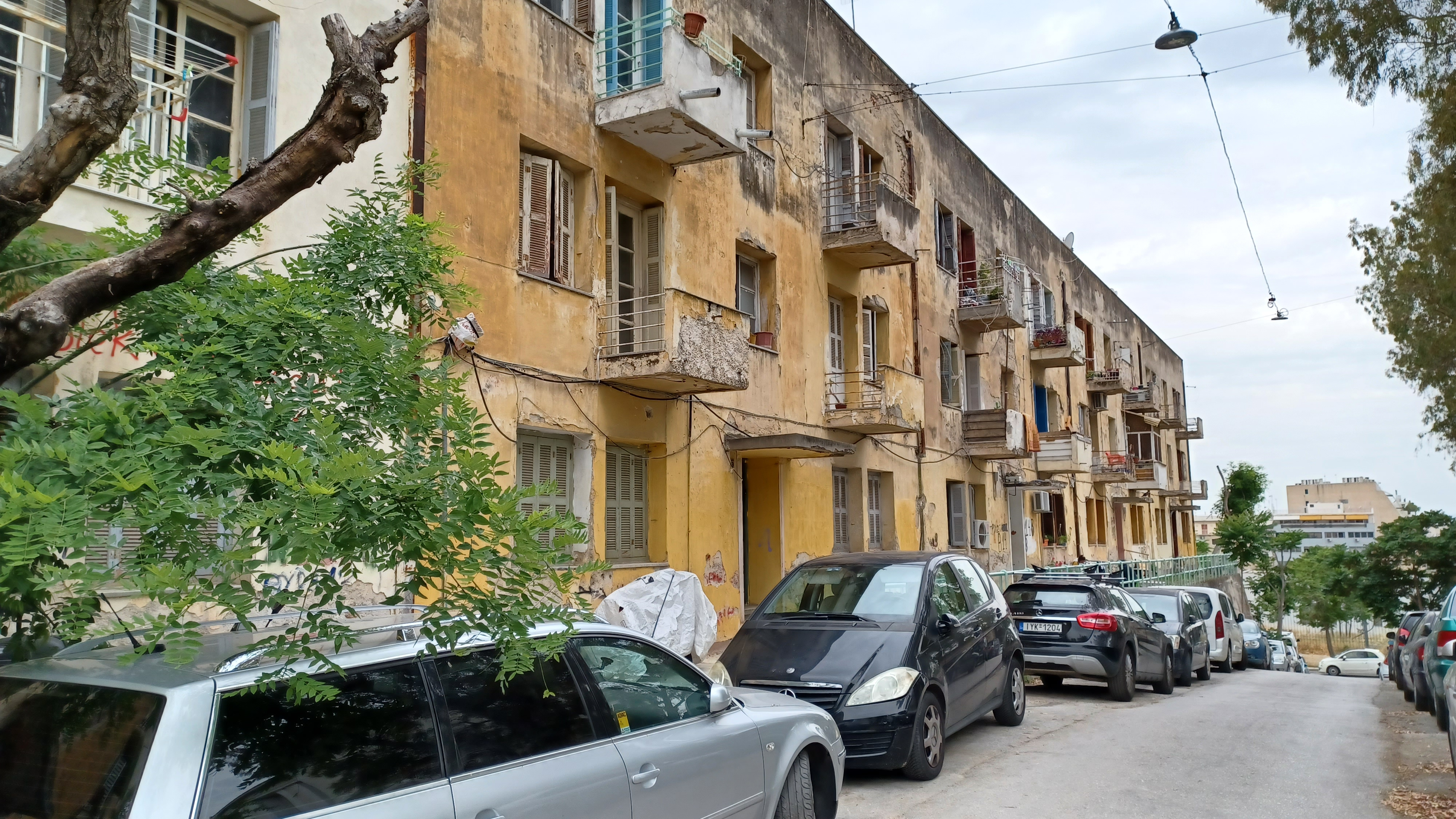
- The Prosfygika as seen from the Alexandras avenue

General information
- Location: Ampelokipoi, Athens
- Coordinates: 37°59′19″N 23°45′16″E
- Year built: 1933-1935

The Prosfygika of Alexandras avenue (Greek: Προσφυγικά Λεωφόρου Αλεξάνδρας), or simply Prosfygika, are a neighborhood and set of housing blocks located in Athens, in the area of Ampelokipoi along Alexandras Avenue. They were originally built to house Greek refugees from the Greco-Turkish War of 1919-1922, taking their name from their original purpose (πρόσφυγας, prosfygas, is the Greek word for refugee). Today they have been assigned the status of a preserved building by the Greek government. Besides regular tenants, a large part of the buildings currently houses squats and social solidarity initiatives.

== Location ==
Prosfygika are located on the north side of Alexandras avenue at the height of 165-169 and consists of 8 rectangle-shaped apartment buildings with their long side parallel to the avenue, with a total of 228 apartments, several of which are inhabited.

== History ==
=== Refugee crisis and construction of blocks ===
The purpose of the housing blocks of Prosfygika was to accommodate some of the large number of refugees from Asia Minor after Greece's defeat in the Greco-Turkish War of 1919–1922. The original plan was for them to be built on the southern side of the Alexandras avenue. However, due to a conflict with Panathinaikos fans, who had been trying to use this space for the construction of the club's field, the location of the refugees' residencies to be created, was transferred to the northern side of the avenue.

Initially, the refugees set up a shanty town in the northern side of Alexandras avenue, that was replaced by the current housing blocks when the residencies were finally built, during the years 1933–1935. The architect Kimon Laskaris and the civil engineer Dimitris Kyriakou were in charge of the construction.

=== The neighborhood during the Dekemvriana battle ===
During the Dekemvriana conflict in 1944, after the liberation of Greece from the Axis forces, the neighborhood was the site of clashes between EAM-ELAS and the British and Greek government forces. ELAS fighters were welcomed and found shelter in the neighborhood, which thus became a target and was bombarded with mortars by the British forces stationed in the nearby Lykavittos hill. Bullet holes on the walls of the houses from these clashes still remain visible. A small memorial column has been set up by the Communist Party of Greece in the spot to honor the EAM-ELAS fighters that were killed during the Dekemvriana battle.

=== Population evictions ===
During the military dictatorship of 1967-1974, a ministerial decision was made to evict the neighborhood inhabitants in order to build a courthouse. The decision however was not implemented.

At the late 1990s the Greek government announced a plan to demolish the buildings and create a park. Owners had to sell their houses to the Greek state or face a compulsory expropriation at the official assessed value. The residents' mobilization and ensuing legal proceedings resulted in the two buildings facing Alexandras avenue being characterized as buildings to be preserved due to their historical, cultural, socio-political and architectural value. By 2004, 137 owners had sold their apartments and another 40 homes were expropriated by the state. The remaining 51 apartments continued resisting against the compulsory expropriation and in 2009, the Central Archaeological Council declared the six remaining housing blocks of Prosfygika as buildings to be preserved.

== Social movements and community ==
Since 2011, the community of Prosfygika neighborhood has organized different initiatives to provide for the needs of its members and of outsiders and create an alternative, self-organizing model of community life. One of the main reasons for the creation of the Assembly of Occupied Prosfygika was to fight against organized crime and drug dealers that had started operating in the neighborhood as a result of the abandonment by the government.

=== Occupied Prosfygika ===
In 2011, the need for political action in the Prosfygika community and their abandonment by the government led to the emergence of the Open Assembly of Struggle of the Prosfygika Community and of People in Solidarity and the Assembly of Occupied Prosfygika, who occupied the empty buildings creating structures of collective bakeries, collective kitchens, a children's shelter, a structure for self-education as well as health structures.

=== Residents ===
The Community of Squatted Prosfygika (Greek: Κοινότητα Κατειλημμένων Προσφυγικών, SY.KA.PRO) was formally established in 2012, following a collectivization process begun in 2010 in which residents placed the keys to their homes collectively on the table, signalling the end of individual management and the adoption of a communal system.

As of 2026, the complex consists of 228 apartments across eight buildings, of which 177 are owned by the Region of Attica and 51 are privately-owned, with a total area of over 17,000 square metres. The community housed over 400 people from 27 different countries, speaking approximately 20 languages, including Greeks, refugees, migrants, approximately 50 children, elderly residents, people with serious health conditions, and people with mental health issues. Many residents belong to groups for whom the private rental market in Athens is effectively inaccessible, including refugees fleeing armed conflict and state repression, and people excluded by the city's worsening housing affordability crisis.

One of the original motivations for the formation of the organised community in 2010 was to expel drug dealers and organised crime that had taken hold of the neighborhood during years of state neglect.

=== Model of organisation ===
The community operates through a horizontal organisational model based on direct democracy, with weekly general assemblies and plenary conferences as the primary decision-making bodies. The collectivization process was inspired by models including the Democratic Autonomous Administration of North and East Syria and the Zapatista communities in Mexico.

All structures operate without public funding. The community describes its project as a social proposal in opposition to what it characterises as the individualism and insecurity produced by capitalism and state withdrawal from social services.

=== Self-organised structures ===
Over its 16 years of operation the community developed 22 self-organised structures serving both residents and the wider Ampelokipi and Gkyzi neighborhoods, operating without public funding.

- Children's house and self-education structure — operates daily with a full educational programme, in direct cooperation with local schools, parents' associations and teachers' unions in Ampelokipi and across Attica.
- Self-organised nursery school — provides childcare for children of community residents and the surrounding neighborhood.
- Collective bakery "Berkin Elvan" — named after Berkin Elvan, a 15-year-old Kurdish boy killed by Turkish police in 2014. The bakery produces bread and pastries daily for residents and the wider neighborhood, operating on a sliding-scale model: those who can pay do so, supporting those who cannot.
- Health structure and social pharmacy — provides healthcare in collaboration with self-organised medical groups and social clinics across Athens.
- Hosting structure for cancer patients — in cooperation with the workers' union of the adjacent Saint Savvas oncology hospital, the community renovated two flats to house relatives of patients undergoing long-term treatment, many of whom previously had no alternative but to sleep in their cars.
- Women's structure — focused on the empowerment and collectivization of women and on challenging traditional family structures within the community.
- Social centre — hosts the community's weekly decision-making assembly and maintains a library open to residents and visitors.
- Collective café and cinema — open to children and adults, serving as a cultural and social space for the community and neighborhood.
- Technical workers' structure — coordinates maintenance and renovation of the buildings, carried out collectively by residents with support from external architects and civil engineers.
- Homeless solidarity crew — provides support for people without housing in the surrounding area.
- Clothing structure — distributes clothing to residents and people in need in the wider neighborhood.

=== Eviction attempts ===
The occupied buildings have been the target of eviction attempts or intrusion into flats by the police:

- On October 31 and November 1, 2016 an attempted intrusion by the police collaborating with members of the neo-nazi criminal organization Golden Dawn, was stopped by the community.
- In November 2022, police raids tried to evict the squatters from the Prosfygika, leading to 79 arrests (of which one was released, being a reporter who was covering the event).
- In June 2024, a 15-year old member of the community was allegedly detained, declined any contact with his parents, beaten, forced naked and threatened with rape by the police in order to reveal names of other members of the community.

=== 2025–2026 eviction threat and campaign ===
==== Redevelopment plan ====
In June 2025, the Region of Attica, together with the Greek Ministry of Culture and the Public Employment Service (DYPA), signed a programmatic agreement for the "redevelopment" of Prosfygika. The plan, with a total estimated cost of €15 million funded through the Attica Regional ESPA 2021–2027 European structural funds programme, envisages the renovation of the buildings and the eviction of the existing community of over 400 residents. The details of the agreement were not made public until mid-January 2026, when reports began circulating in local media.

According to the community, the plan would convert the buildings into social housing units and a hostel for relatives of patients at the adjacent Saint Savvas oncology hospital — functions the community argues it already provides through its self-organised structures, without public funding. Critics of the plan have noted that the Municipality of Athens owns approximately 80,000 vacant apartments in the city centre that remain unused. The community's legal representative, Panagiotis Antoniou, stated that residents had not been consulted and had not been offered alternative accommodation, calling it "impossible for these people and their collectives not to have a say in a plan that will actually displace the most vulnerable among them." A Region of Attica official, speaking anonymously, acknowledged there was "no clear information on what will happen to the people living in Prosfygika."

The community has proposed an alternative: self-financed restoration of the buildings, carried out with the participation of architects, civil engineers and other technical specialists, organised through the non-profit civil law company "Residents and Friends of Prosfygika Alexandras Av."

==== Hunger strike ====
On 5 February 2026, community member Aristotelis Chantzis began an indefinite hunger strike, stating he would continue until death unless the authorities cancelled the eviction plan. In a public statement, Chantzis declared: "As the Community of Squatted Prosfygika, we have decided to defend our social proposal, the people, the structures, and the historical memory of the Prosfygika to the end." Announcing the strike, Chantzis stated: "We know that if the Prosfygika are evacuated, a large portion of us will end up on the streets." Chantzis subsequently restricted his diet to "Water, Tea, 10-25 grams of Sugar per day, 1-1.5 teaspoons of Salt per day, Vitamins B1, B6, B12, Magnesium and Potassium."

By mid-April 2026, after more than 70 days without food, a monitoring medical team reported severe deterioration of his condition, including signs consistent with starvation and muscle atrophy. On 3 April 2026, his 58th day without food, Chantzis was required to report in person to Ampelokipi police station as a condition of a prior conviction for participating in a pro-Palestine demonstration. He collapsed outside the station and was taken by ambulance to Gennimatas Hospital.

A second community member, Suzon Doppagne, announced her intention to join the hunger strike on 1 May 2026.

As of June 25 the hunger strikes have been suspended after the Athens Municipal Council voted through a resolution which reportedly called for 'the Region of Attica to halt implementation of its programme agreement', with the aim of saving the lives of the hunger strikers, stating explicitly in the resolution; "Today, this necessity becomes imperative, as the life of hunger striker Aristotelis Chantzis is at a critical point. There must not be, in 2026, a death from hunger strike in the country." Following this development the Prosfygika Occupied Community released a statement announcing a cessation of the hunger strike, exclaiming “The struggle has been won, the struggle continues.”, going on to express some concern if the relevant institutions will truly 'fulfill their obligation', imploring their supporters to "closely monitor the process.". Finally they stress that Chantzis condition is critical as of publication date, remaining hospitalized within an intensive care unit due to 'acute Wernicke encephalopathy' and ataxia.

==== Mobilisation and international solidarity ====
On 14 March 2026, more than 4,000 people marched along Alexandras Avenue in Athens in support of the community. Solidarity actions took place in Poland, Serbia, Belgium, France, Germany, Italy, Spain, Portugal and Colombia.

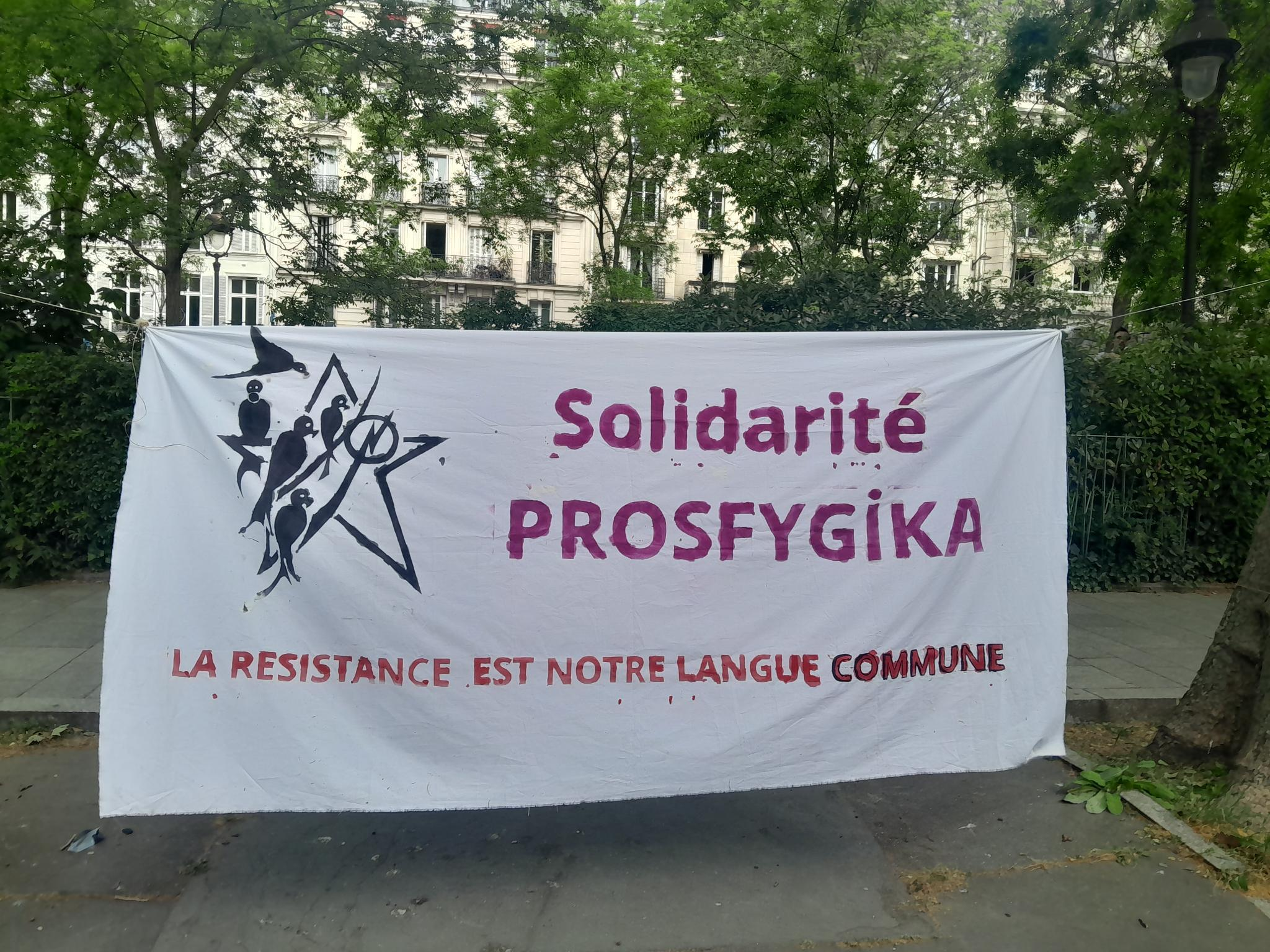
Banner by anarchists expressing solidarity with the Prosfygika squat during the demonstration of 1st May 2026 in Paris

The Party of the European Left issued a statement condemning the eviction attempt during the Housing Action Days 2026, describing the community as "an extraordinary example of self-management and collective urban regeneration" and holding the Greek government and the Region of Attica directly responsible for the health of the hunger striker.

The community presented its case twice to the Athens City Council, in March and April 2026, calling for the cancellation of the regional contract. The campaign operates under the hashtag #saveprosfygika, with an international coordination website at saveprosfygika.gr.
