= Ampelokipoi, Athens =

Ampelokipoi Αμπελόκηποι
- Neighborhood
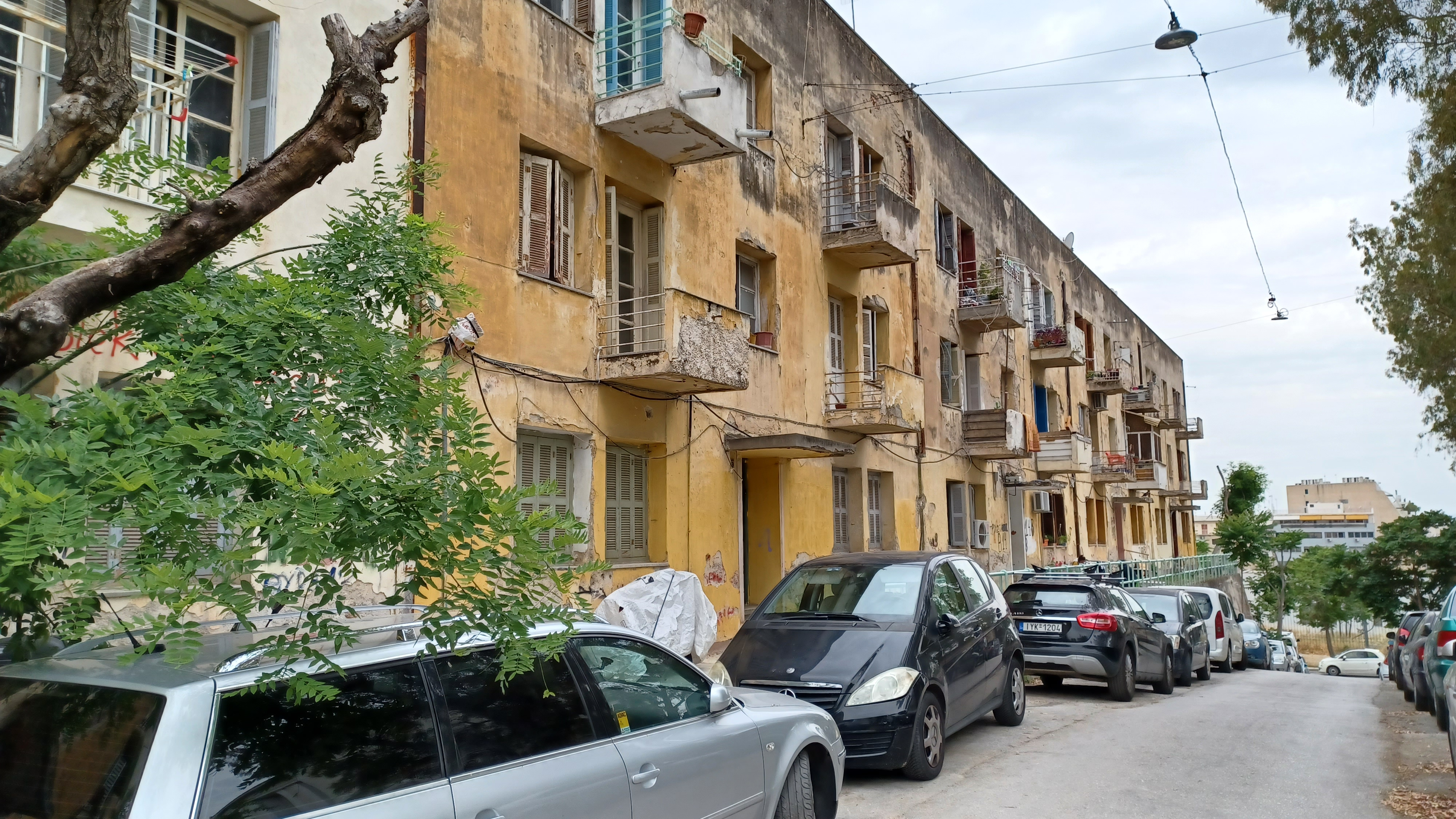
- Ampelokipoi

- Location within Athens municipality
- Coordinates: 37°59′23″N 23°45′53″E
- Country: Greece
- Region: Attica
- City: Athens
- Postal code: 115 22, 115 23, 115 24, 115 26
- Website: www.cityofathens.gr

Ampelokipoi or Ampelokipi (Greek: Αμπελόκηποι, pronounced [am.beˈlo.ci.pi]), meaning 'vineyards', is a large, central district of the city of Athens. Ampelokipoi is in the center of Athens, near Zografou, Goudi, Psychiko and Pagkrati. The area is famous for hosting Panathinaikos's home ground since it was inaugurated in 1922.

Two metro stations are located in the district: the Ambelokipi station and the Panormou station.

== History ==
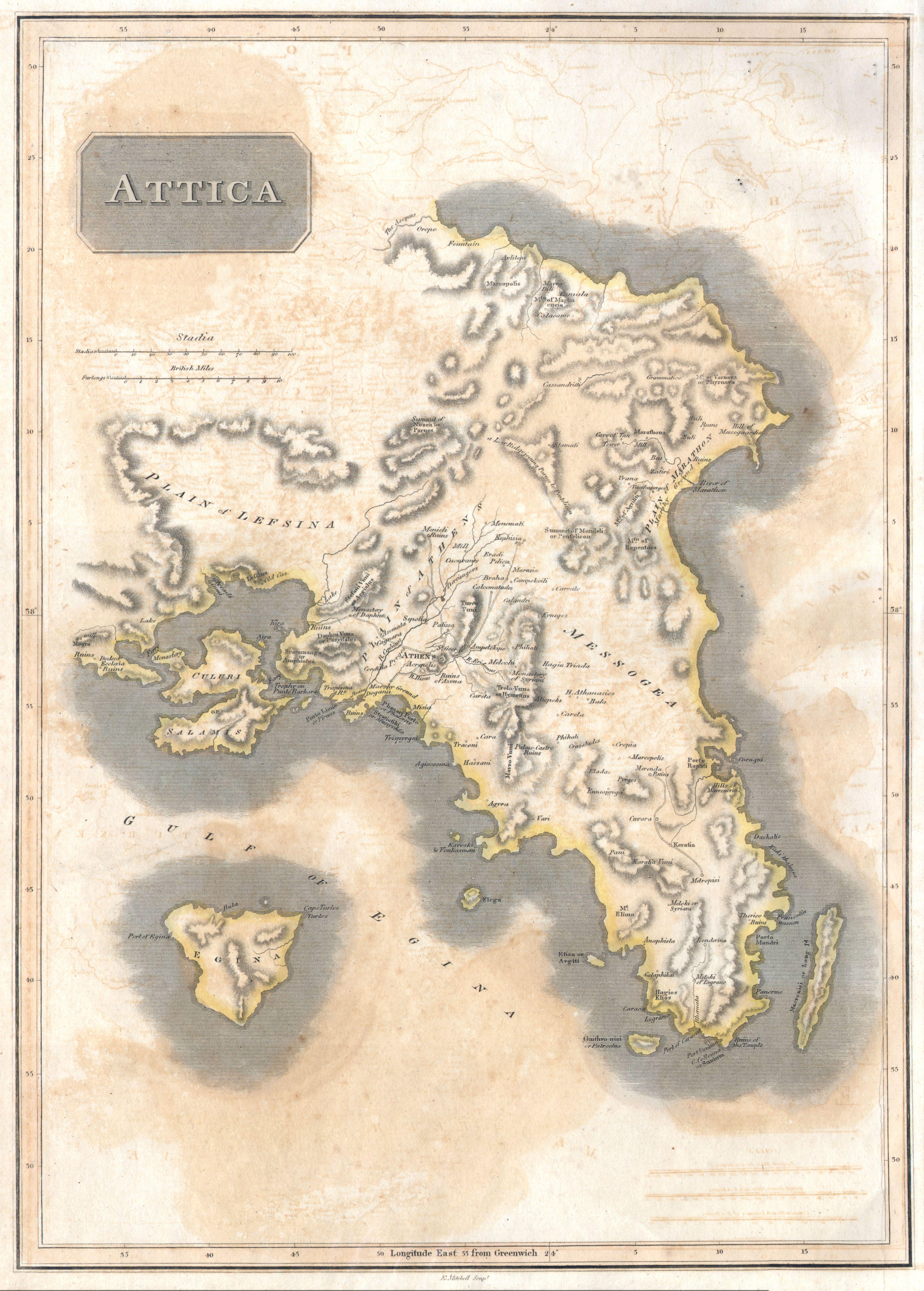
The village Ampelokipoi is indicated in the map of 1815

Before the Greek independence, at the beginning of the 19th century, Ampelokipoi was a village a few kilometers north-east of Athens. The village Ampelokipoi is noted in the maps of this period. In the late 19th century, the village still remained outside the boundaries of Athens agglomeration. Then some cottages of rich Athenians were built in this area. Due to its healthy climate, many hospitals were built in Ampelokipoi in the late 19th century and the beginning of the 20th. Today in this area there are the hospitals Erythros Stavros Hospital (Red Cross), Errikos Dynan Hospital, Ippokrateio Hospital, Elpis Hospital and Agios Sabbas Hospital. The population explosion in Ampelokipoi happened after the Asia Minor Disaster, in 1922, when many refugees settled in this area. For the residence of the refugees, the government had originally chosen the area of the stadium of Panathinaikos that had been built in the same period. So a conflict broke out between refugees and Panathinaikos fans and finally the government changed the place for the settling of refugees. The new district was named Kountouriotika and was located around of Panathinaikos stadium. Few years later the government built a new neighborhood for the refugees opposite of Panathinaikos stadium, known as Prosfygika of Alexandras Avenue. These houses were built between 1933 and 1935 and today they have been proclaimed monuments of historical heritage.A large part of the Prosfygika buildings are occupied and many self-organized initiatives are hosted in them.

== Sports ==
Ampelokipoi is where Panathinaikos' ground lies today. It as also the home to Ampelokipoi B.C., a basketball club founded in 1929.

Sport clubs based in Ampelokipoi
Club	Founded	Sports	Achievements
Panathinaikos A.O.	1908 (originally as Football Club of Athens)	Football, basketball, volleyball, water polo, track and field and others	One of the most successful clubs in Greece. Most successful Greek club in European competitions (basketball)
Ampelokipoi B.C.	1929 (originally as Hephaestus Athens)	Basketball	Earlier presence in A1 Ethniki basketball

== Climate ==
Ampelokipoi has a hot-summer Mediterranean climate (Csa). It has mild winters and hot summers, with particularly warm summer nights. The driest months are July and August while the rainiest period is during the Autumn.

Climate data for Ampelokipoi (2009-2024)
Month	Jan	Feb	Mar	Apr	May	Jun	Jul	Aug	Sep	Oct	Nov	Dec	Year
Record high °C (°F)	23.0 (73.4)	24.2 (75.6)	25.2 (77.4)	31.0 (87.8)	37.0 (98.6)	41.7 (107.1)	43.3 (109.9)	42.9 (109.2)	38.2 (100.8)	33.4 (92.1)	27.0 (80.6)	23.1 (73.6)	43.3 (109.9)
Mean daily maximum °C (°F)	13.3 (55.9)	14.8 (58.6)	17.0 (62.6)	21.3 (70.3)	26.1 (79.0)	30.6 (87.1)	33.8 (92.8)	33.4 (92.1)	29.0 (84.2)	23.6 (74.5)	19.3 (66.7)	15.2 (59.4)	23.1 (73.6)
Daily mean °C (°F)	10.6 (51.1)	11.8 (53.2)	13.6 (56.5)	17.4 (63.3)	22.1 (71.8)	26.5 (79.7)	29.6 (85.3)	29.5 (85.1)	25.3 (77.5)	20.2 (68.4)	16.2 (61.2)	12.5 (54.5)	19.6 (67.3)
Mean daily minimum °C (°F)	7.8 (46.0)	8.8 (47.8)	10.3 (50.5)	13.5 (56.3)	18.0 (64.4)	22.3 (72.1)	25.5 (77.9)	25.5 (77.9)	21.6 (70.9)	16.8 (62.2)	13.2 (55.8)	9.7 (49.5)	16.1 (60.9)
Record low °C (°F)	−1.3 (29.7)	−0.5 (31.1)	0.0 (32.0)	4.5 (40.1)	12.2 (54.0)	15.1 (59.2)	19.3 (66.7)	20.5 (68.9)	14.9 (58.8)	8.1 (46.6)	5.8 (42.4)	0.7 (33.3)	−1.3 (29.7)
Average rainfall mm (inches)	65.4 (2.57)	57.8 (2.28)	37.5 (1.48)	19.3 (0.76)	24.0 (0.94)	31.0 (1.22)	11.5 (0.45)	5.6 (0.22)	35.8 (1.41)	50.3 (1.98)	69.9 (2.75)	82.5 (3.25)	490.6 (19.31)
Source 1: National Observatory of Athens Monthly Bulletins (Aug 2009 - Jan 2024)
Source 2: Ampelokipoi N.O.A station, World Meteorological Organization

== Buildings ==
Important buildings located in the area:

=== Government buildings ===
- Hellenic Police Headquarters (Αστυνομικό Μέγαρο)
- Court of Cassation (Greece) (Άρειος Πάγος)
- Athens Prefecture Building (Νομαρχία Αθηνών)

=== Hospitals ===
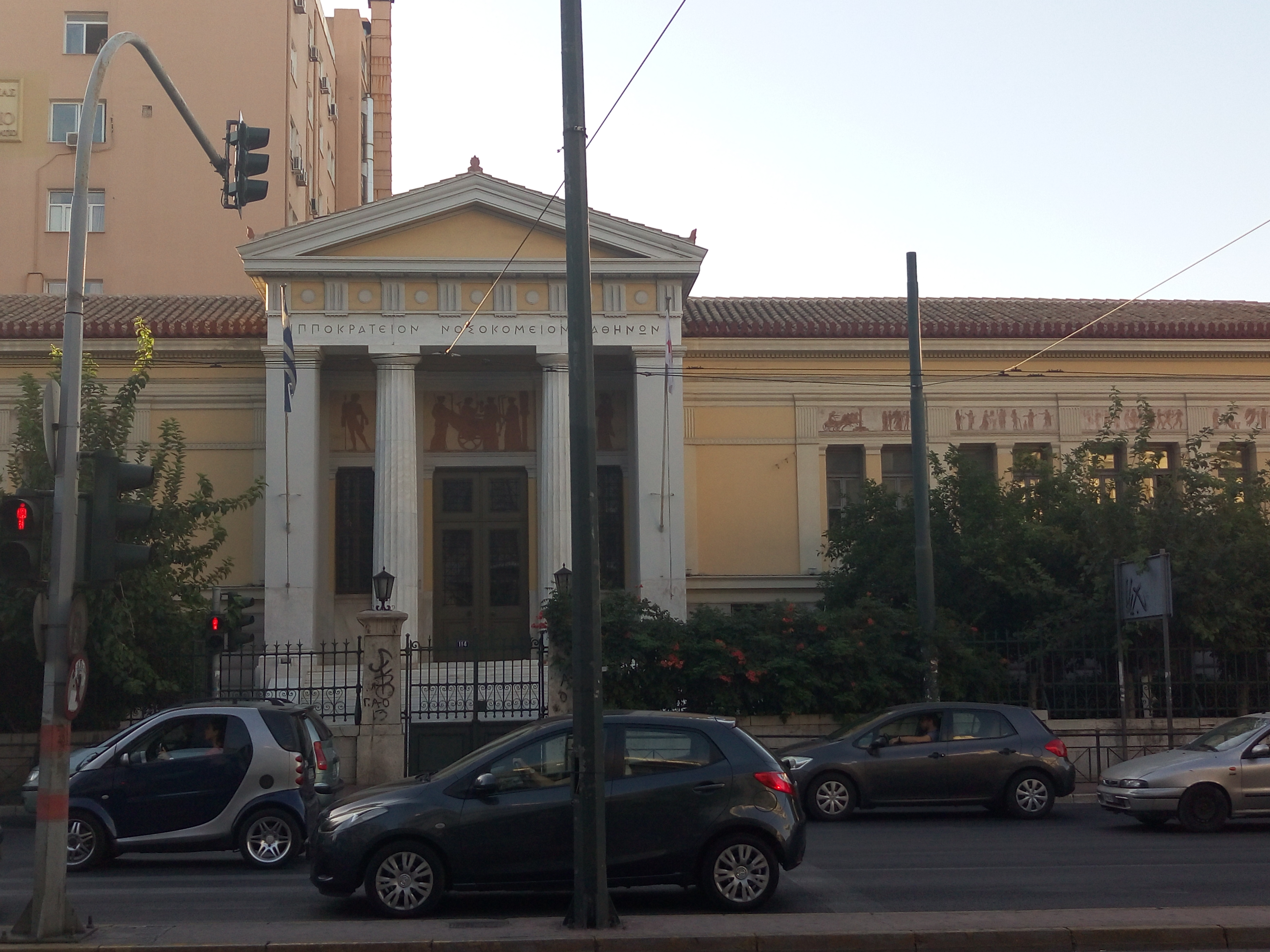
Hippokrateio Hospital

- Erythros Stavros Hospital (Red Cross)
- Errikos Dunant Hospital (Henry Dunant)
- Hippokrateio Hospital
- Elpis Hospital
- Agios Savvas Hospital

=== Schools ===
- Formerly the Philippine School in Greece (Katipunan Philippines Cultural Academy)

=== Other ===
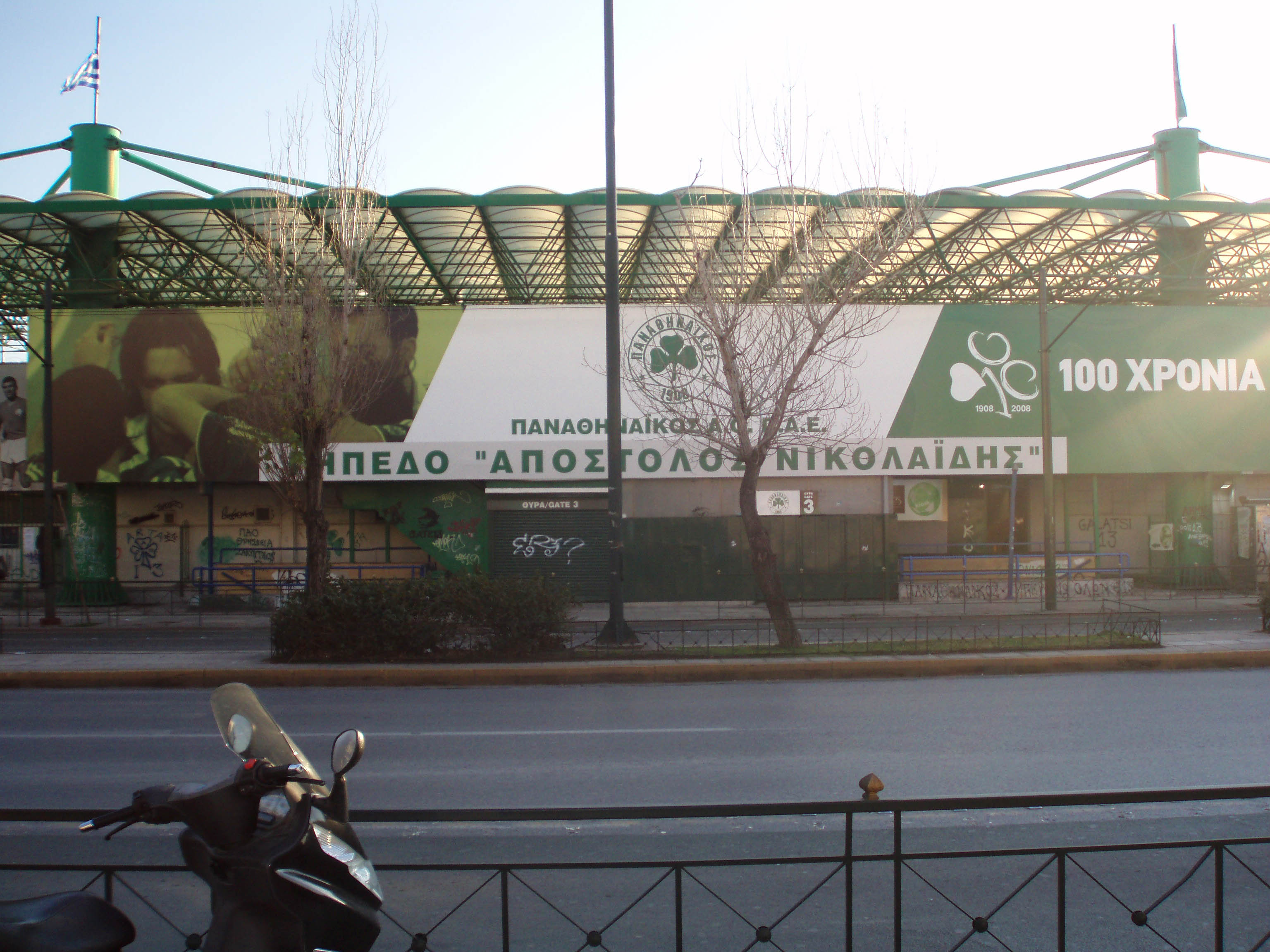
Leoforos Alexandras Stadium

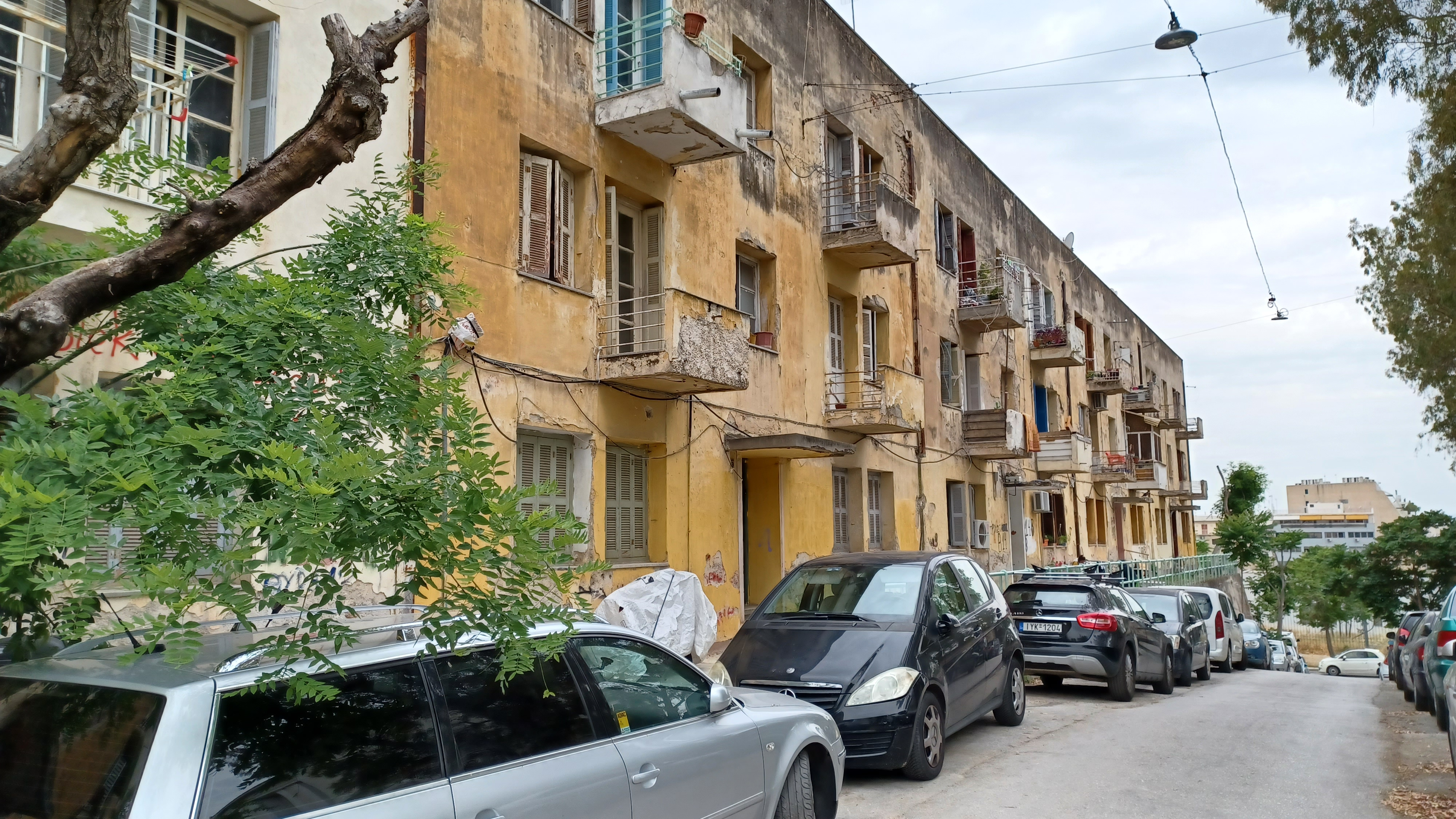
Prosfygika in Ampelokipoi, opposite of the Panathinaikos Stadium

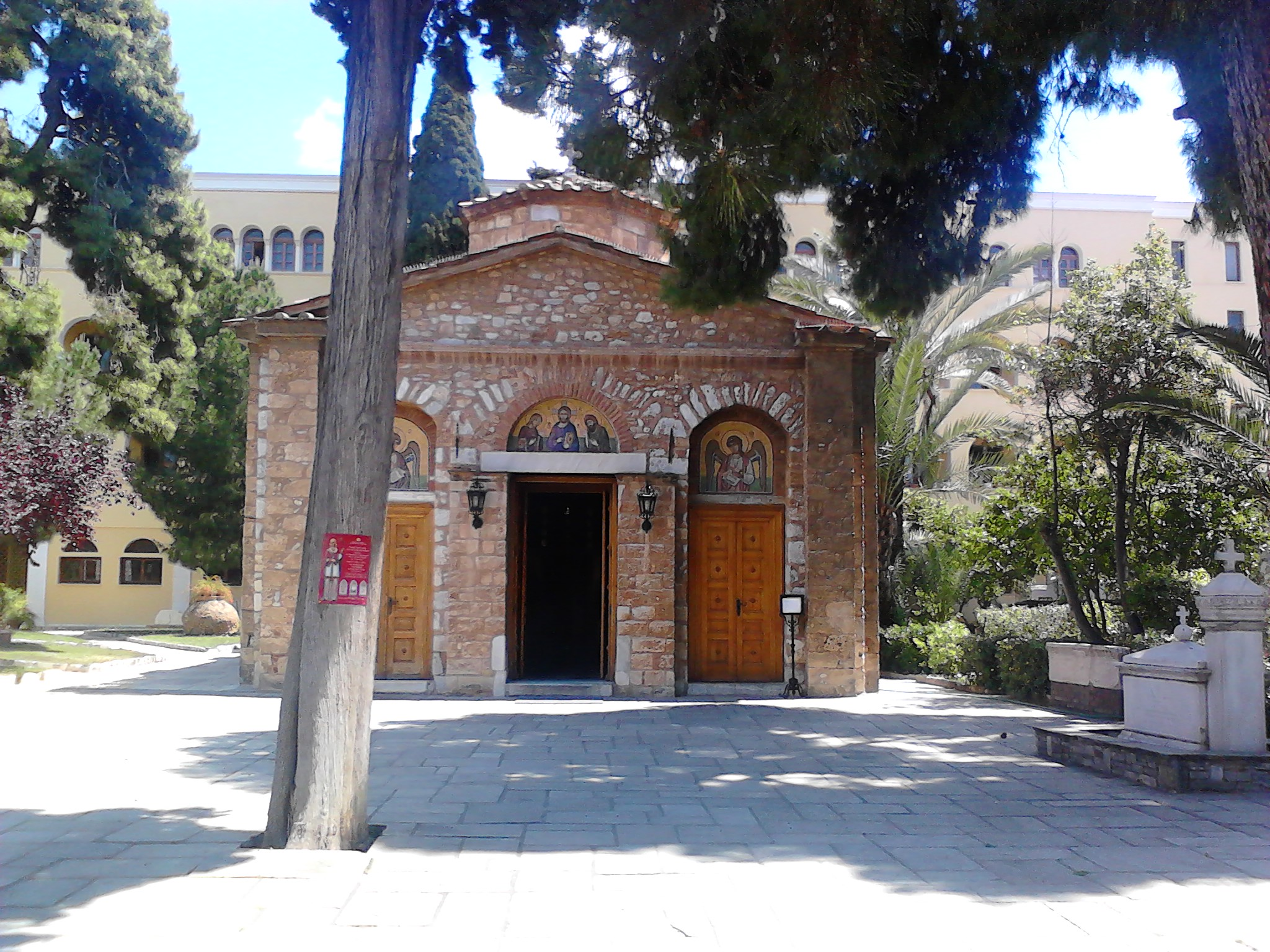
Petraki Monastery

- Leoforos Alexandras Stadium – the traditional athletic center of Panathinaikos A.C.
- Athens Tower (Πύργος των Αθηνών) – the tallest building in Greece.
- Apollo Tower (Πύργος Απόλλων) – the tallest residential tower in Greece. It is 80m tall and consists of 25 floors.
- Prosfygika of Alexandras Avenue
- Petraki Monastery

=== Hotels ===
- President Hotel Athens

=== Cinemas ===
- Aavora
- Alfavil
- Astron
- Athinaion
- Danaos
- Galaxias
- Nirvana
- ODEON Zina
- Plaza

== Residential streets ==
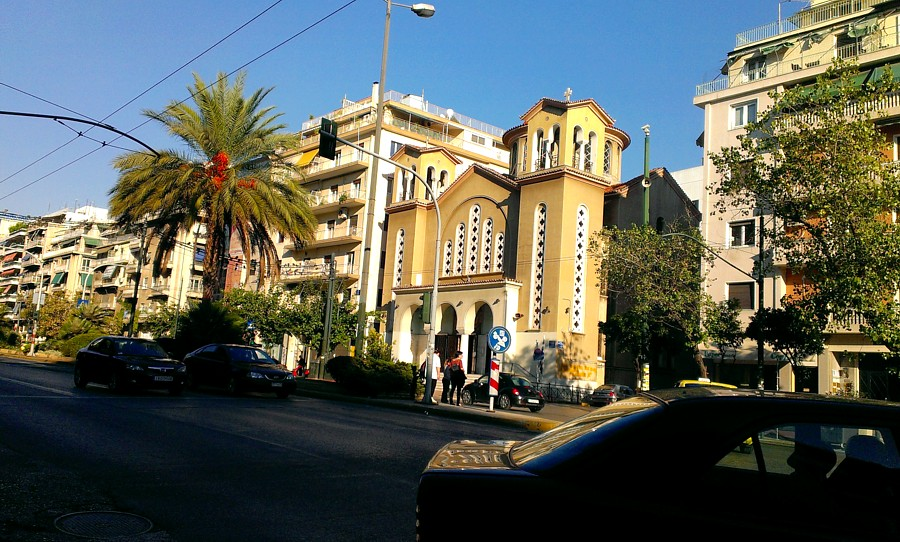
Kifisias street

This is a list of residential streets in the Ampelokipoi area. Most of these are named after geographic locations:

- Acarnanias Street
- Achaias Street
- Alexandras Avenue
- Amaliados Street
- Ampelakion Street
- Aretaiou Street
- Aoou Street
- Aphaeas Street
- Argolidos Street
- Artis Street
- Boeotias Street
- Colchidos Street
- Corinthias Street
- Daskalaki Street
- Dimitsanas Street
- Doukissis Plakentias Street
- Elsin Street
- Estias Street
- Etolias Street
- Evrytanias Street
- Gytheiou Street
- Kalamon Street
- Kalavrias Street
- Karystou Street
- Kedrinou Street
- Komotinis Street
- Lamias Street
- Larissis Street
- Lasithiou Street
- Loudias Street
- Louizis Riankour Street
- Maiandroupoleos Street
- Megalou Spilaiou Street
- Messinias Street
- Nileon Street
- Panormou Street
- Papada Street
- Pavli Street
- Peramou Street
- Phocidos Street
- Phthiotidos Street
- Portarias Street
- Pouliou Street
- Sevastoupoleos Street
- Sithonias Street
- Stageiron Street
- Theophanous Street
- Trifyllias Street
- Trikalon Street
- Tyanon Street
- Vardousion Street
- Vatopediou Street
- Velestinou Street
- Vrastovou Street
- Vytinas Street
