= Alexandras Avenue =

Avenue in Athens, Greece

Coordinates: 37.9895°N 23.7457°E

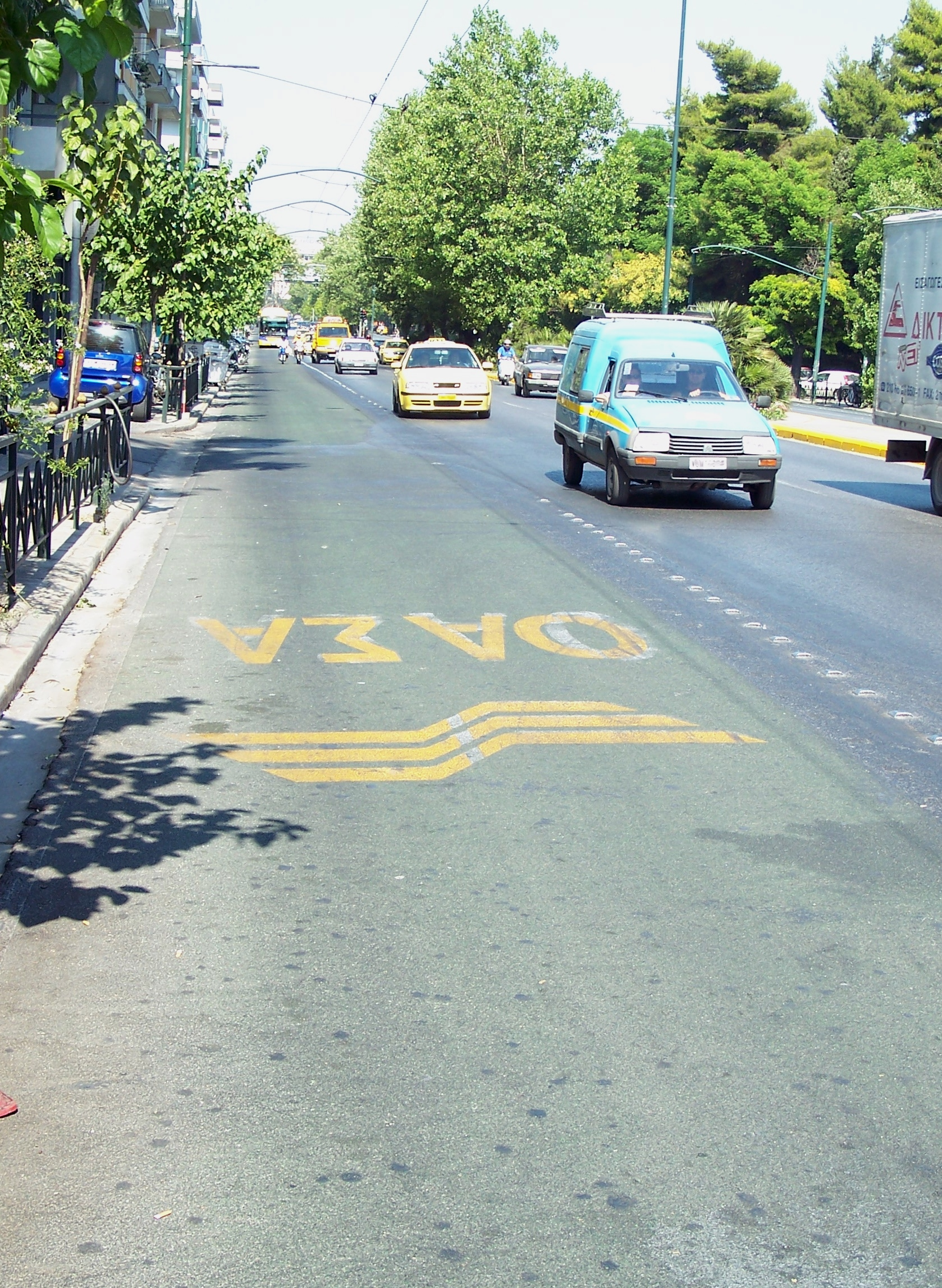
Alexandras Avenue

Alexandra's Avenue (Greek: Λεωφόρος Αλεξάνδρας, Leoforos Alexandras) is a main east–west thoroughfare running from Patission Street/28 October Street and Kifissias Avenue in the northern part of the center of Athens, Greece. It is named after Princess Alexandra of Greece, later Grand Duchess Alexandra Georgievna of Russia (daughter of George I of Greece). The avenue has two regular traffic lanes plus one dedicated bus lane per direction. Its total length is approximately 3 km.

== Panathinaikos Stadium ==
The sports center of Panathinaikos Athletic Club, named Leoforos Alexandras Stadium, lies to the south side near Panormou Street, opposite the St. Savvas Cancer Hospital. It was opened in 1922.

== Intersections and other notable landmarks ==
Major streets that cross this avenue include Mavrommateon, Spyrou Trikoupi, Valtinon, Vasileiou Voulgaroktonou, Charilaou Trikoupi, Ippokratous, Gkyzi, Koniari, Panormou and D. Soutsou Streets. The avenue features Egiptos Square and the forested Argentinis Dimokratias Square (meaning Argentine Republic) near the Argentine embassy and the Prosfygika housing blocks and occupied community. The Pedion Areos lies to the north in the west end of the avenue while Strefi Hill is to the south. The Ambelokipi metro line 3 station is near Panormou street on the eastern end of the Avenue.
