= F.C. Goudi Athens =

Goudi Athens
- Full name: F.C. Goudi Athens
- Founded: 1906
- Dissolved: 1945
Home colours	Away colours

F.C. Goudi Athens (or Goudi) is a defunct Greek football team of Athens based in homonymous district. It was founded in October 1906 by dissatisfied athletes of the Ethnikos Athens and was a founding member both in 1919 of the Athens-Piraeus Football Clubs Association (since 1921) and in 1926 of the Hellenic Football Federation.

It is also referred to as the "Gymnastics Club" when its executives took part in track and field and volleyball games, without, however, particularly developing the specific sports. It permanently suspended its activities during the first post-war period (circa 1945).

== SP Goudi ==
=== 1906–1912 ===
Modern sources consider SP Goudi as the first in Greece on the one hand a purely football club and on the other hand to create, at the foot of Hymettus, the first stadium exclusively for the sport. One of its founders and pioneer, Panagis Vryonis, had served during his studies as goalkeeper of the Swiss Servette. The colors of the club were red-black.

Won the Panhellenic Championship organized by the Hellenic Amateur Athletic Association (SEGAS) in 1907-08 season, with 9–0 victory over Peiraikos Syndesmos, 7–1 over Ethnikos GS and 21-0 of Panellinios G.S. For the 1908-09 season, they were limited to the 2nd place behind Peiraikos Syndesmos, but in the 1909-10 and 1912, returned as champion.

=== Athinaikos SP and Hope ===
In April 1912, the POA and PS Goudi decided to unite under the name "Athinaikos Football Club". Apart from football, he would also form field hockey and tennis teams in Neo Faliro (an activity already developed by the POA). The event was recorded extensively in the press with details such as the composition of the first board of directors (in parentheses their original association): chairman I. Botasis (Goudi), vice-chairman G. Vryonis (C), general secretary I. Bouboulis (POA), special secretary K. Nikolopoulos (P ), treasurer Th. Filaretos (C), leader P. Filippou (P), deputy leader R. Rossetis (C), members A. Argyropoulos (C), P. Economidis (P), G. Psaraftis (C), honorary members P. Vryonis (C), K. Goulimis (P), Om. Iosifoglou (C) and S. Lorandos (P). Athinaikos was, according to reports at the time, the strongest club of the next period together with the Piraiki Enosis, won the 1914 Panhellenic Championship organized by the Hellenic Olympic Committee (EOA, now EOE).

The "Hope Football Club" of Athens was an unofficial football club founded in 1914 as a subsidiary of Athinaikos. He participated in friendly matches with respective, but also official teams, while Vasilis Sarris served as its president. In 1917 it was recognized by the Court and renamed the Athinaikos Sports Club, which in 1952 relocated from Plaka to Vyronas to merge with the local AE Neas Elvetias and create the Athinaikos Vyronas.

== APO (Neon) Goudi ==
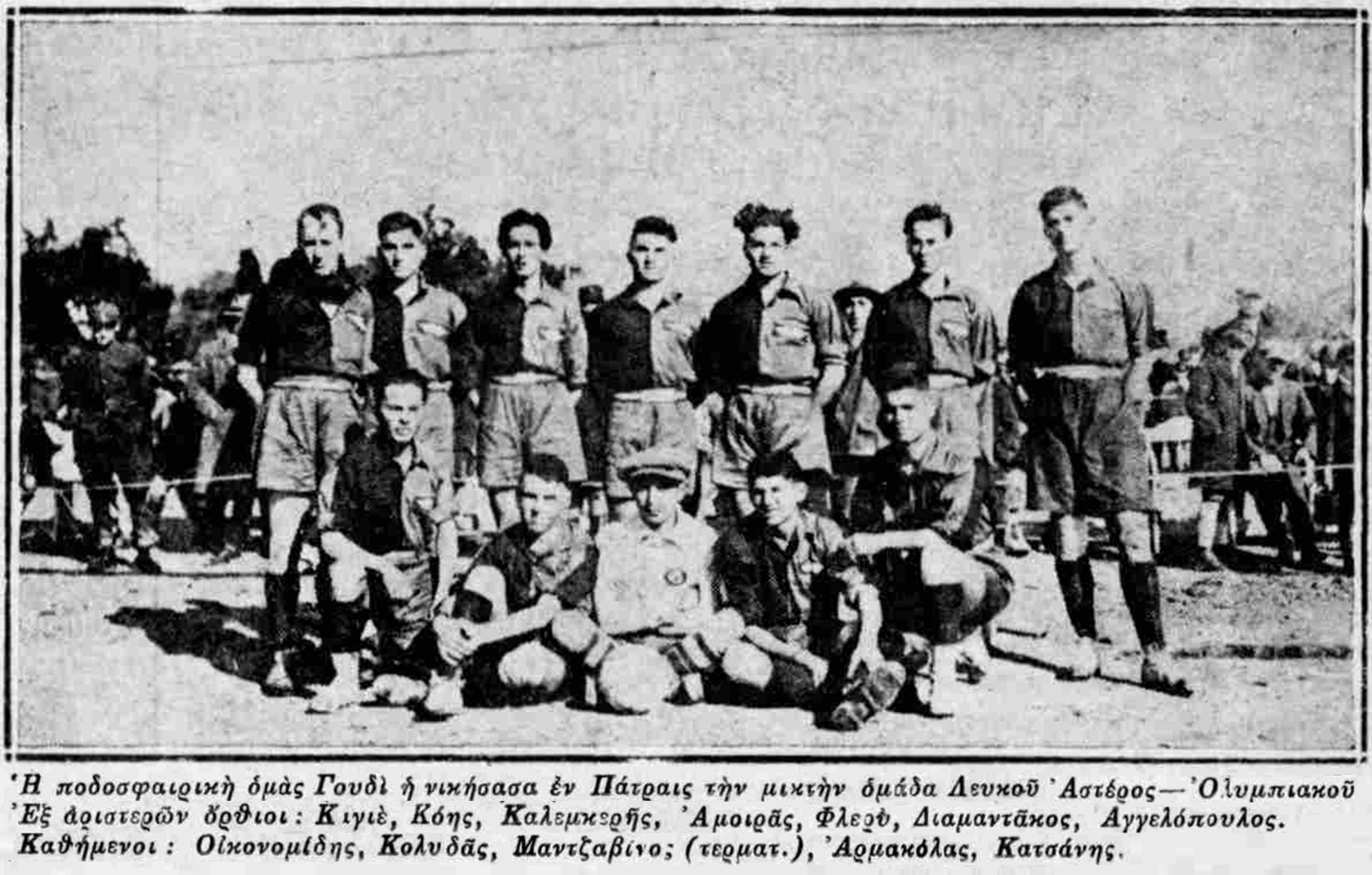
The team of 1926

The coexistence of the former members of SP Goudi with those of POA evolved into short-lived and soon most of them left for the re-establishment of their old club, this time as "Athinaikos Football Club" Goudi" and later "Athletic Football Club Goudi" or APO Goudi. Referring to the sources of the time, often with the -clarifying- name "Neon Goudi", it continued the course of the predecessor SP and in 1926 festive events were held for their 20th anniversary. It had a privately owned stadium in the district, the only one initially in Athens, until the creation of the Panathinaikos stadium.

=== 1919–1935 ===
Among the victorious countries of World War I, the Inter-Allied Games were organized in 1919 in Paris, which also included a football tournament, with the Greek team to staff four players of APO Goudi: M. Isaias, Leon. Tragalos, G. Protopoulos and Vr. Branopoulos. With the establishment of Athens Football Clubs Association, they participate in the Athenian championship with his greatest successes the championships of 1932 and 1933. He also took 2nd place in 1928 when he lost in the final to Atromitos. Through the Athens championship Goudi participated in the National category for 2 years, in 1934 occupying the 5th place, and in 1935 occupying the 6th place. He also undertook innovative initiatives such as the organization of championships between the schools of the area, etc.

=== 1937–1945 ===
The former star team was relegated in 1937 to the 2nd tier of Athens and finished in last place in 1938, avoiding relegation thanks to the increase in the number of teams from the new year. This was followed by The Occupation, which essentially marked the end of the historic club.

After the war, his presence is mentioned on two occasions in 1945, but he did not take part in the official EPSA championship. On April 29, in the Freedom Cup, he was drawn with Daphni Athens. In October of the same year he participated in the ephemeral Union of Collaborating Associations created by Panathinaikos, which organized the "Ohi" Cup. Goudi was drawn with Athinaikos, but did not appear in the match. This was the last activity of the historical group.

== Honours ==
- SEGAS Championship
  - Winners (4): 1907–08, 1909–10, 1912–13, 1913–14
- SEGAS Cup
  - Winners (1): 1911–12
- Athens FCA First Division
  - Winners (2): 1931–32, 1932–33
