= List of Greek football champions =

Greek League (1st tier)
- HOC and SEGAS Championship (1906–1927)
- Panhellenic Championship (1927–1959)
- Alpha Ethniki/Super League Greece 1 (1959–present)

Country
- Greece

Founded
- 1905 (HOC/SEGAS), 1923 (EPSE), 1927 (HFF)

Number of teams
- 14 (since 2019–20)

Current champions
- AEK Athens (2025–26)

Most successful club
- Olympiacos (48 championships)
- Current: 2025–26 Super League Greece

Titles won by club (%)
1. Olympiacos – 48 (53.3%)
2. Panathinaikos – 20 (22.2%)
3. AEK Athens – 14 (14.6%)
4. PAOK – 4 (4.44%)
5. Aris – 3 (3.33%)
6. AEL – 1 (1.11%)

The Greek football champions are the winners of Super League Greece, the highest professional football league in Greece. Officially the title has been contested since 1927–28, in various forms of competition, officially bearing the Super League name since 2006–07. AEK Athens are the current title holders, having won in 2025–26.

Efforts to build a region–wide championship were established as early as 1898, when only the Football League First Division in England and the Swiss Serie A in Switzerland had been codified as nationwide, independent league tournaments. After the concept seemed to have faded by the turn of the 20th century, various championships, initially organised by the Hellenic Athletics Federation (known as SEGAS), were held from 1905 to 1914. However, it was put on hold at the start of the First Balkan War. After a 9–year hiatus following World War I and the Greco–Turkish War, it was revived, organised by the Greece Football Clubs Association (FCA), originally containing teams from Athens and Piraeus, beginning from the 1921–22 season.

Despite efforts to host a national final between the Greek FCA champion and the Salonican teams' champion, the FCA collapsed thanks to secret deals that spawned new sports associations, such as Ethnikos Piraeus and Olympiacos. Its collapse led to the creation of two new FCA organisations, Athens Football Clubs Association and its Piraeus and Macedonian counterparts. Afterward, it would run as a nationwide championship until 1927.

In late 1926, the Hellenic Football Federation (HFF) was officially formed under the supervision of SEGAS. Controversy ensued when three teams (Olympiacos, Panathinaikos and AEK Athens, collectively known as P.O.K.) withdrew from the nationwide championship, citing disagreements over income distribution to championship teams. As the first championship under the HFF dwindled in income and size, the Federation conceded and the three teams were re–instated in July 1928.

In what was named the Panhellenic Championship, the regional champions formed a national group, from which the national champion was decided, with the title being decided in a final between regional champions until 1934. In this period, the P.O.K., primarily Olympiacos, won all but three championships, and all three teams greatly expanded their influence to become the dominant sides, often coming at odds with the HFF. After a hiatus in the Second World War, with German forces effectively dismantling the HFF and multiple attempts at a return failing, the HFF reorganised and hosted the Panhellenic Championship again from 1945–46 onward. Olympiacos would dominate in the post–war era, winning a record six consecutive championships from 1953 to the Championship's conclusion in 1959.

In the summer of 1959, the regional leagues were unified in a single, round–robin championship, a landmark in the history of Greek football. Since 1959–60, the top league has been formed in its current form, named Alpha Ethniki, with the league becoming professional from the 1979–80 season onward. The Alpha Ethniki name was kept until 2005–06, when Super League Greece was founded, with expansion of distribution deals and no expansion of the league format. The unified league era has been characterised by lengthy, successful dynasties, such as Panathinaikos' initial domination, with 8 titles from 1960 to 1972 and Olympiacos' dynasty from the 1990s onward, with the team winning 22 league titles from 1997 to 2022. AEL is a notable exception, becoming the only club from outside of Athens or Thessaloniki to win a league title, in 1988, under Jacek Gmoch, who had also won a league title with Panathinaikos in 1984.

Only six clubs have become champions since the HFF's inception, with tournaments prior to 1927 being non–recognised. Olympiacos has won the most titles, with forty–eight, the last being in 2025, followed by Panathinaikos with twenty, last won in 2010 and AEK Athens, last won in 2026. Rivals of Thessaloniki have won 7 titles in total. PAOK has won four titles, followed by Aris Thessaloniki with three, last won in 2024 and 1946 respectively, while AEL won their singular league title in 1988. Aris Thessaloniki won the first HFF–sanctioned Panhellenic Championship in 1927–28, while Panathinaikos won the first Alpha Ethniki campaign in 1959–60. AEK Athens, Aris Thessaloniki and AEL have played in all professional tiers of the Greek football league system, while Olympiacos, Panathinaikos and PAOK have never been relegated, having partook in every Alpha Ethniki/Super League league season since its inception in 1959.

== Performance by club (1927–) ==
Club	Champions	Winning years
Olympiacos	48	1931, 1933, 1934, 1936, 1937, 1938, 1947, 1948, 1951, 1954, 1955, 1956, 1957, 1958, 1959, 1966, 1967, 1973, 1974, 1975, 1980, 1981, 1982, 1983, 1987, 1997, 1998, 1999, 2000, 2001, 2002, 2003, 2005, 2006, 2007, 2008, 2009, 2011, 2012, 2013, 2014, 2015, 2016, 2017, 2020, 2021, 2022, 2025
Panathinaikos	20	1930, 1949, 1953, 1960, 1961, 1962, 1964, 1965, 1969, 1970, 1972, 1977, 1984, 1986, 1990, 1991, 1995, 1996, 2004, 2010
AEK Athens	14	1939, 1940, 1963, 1968, 1971, 1978, 1979, 1989, 1992, 1993, 1994, 2018, 2023, 2026
PAOK	4	1976, 1985, 2019, 2024
Aris Thessaloniki	3	1928, 1932, 1946
Larissa	1	1988

Source: rsssf.org

== Champions ==
=== Early championships ===
(not counted by HFF)

Season	Winner
1898	Cycling Club of Athens
1899	Panellinios G.S.

=== HOC / SEGAS Championship, Greece FCA Championship and EPSE Championship ===
- 1905–06 to 1926–27 (not counted by HFF)

Season	Winner
1905–06	Ethnikos Athens
1906–07	Ethnikos Athens
1907–08	Goudi Athens
1908–09	Piraikos Syndesmos
1909–10	Goudi Athens
1910–11	Podosferikos Omilos Athinon
1911–12	Panellinios Podosferikos Omilos
1912–13	Goudi Athens
1913–14	Athinaikos SP
1915	Panellinios Podosferikos Omilos
1916	Athinaikos SP
1916–17	Not held
1917–18	Not Finished
1918–19	Not Held
1919–20	Not Held
1920–21	Panellinios Podosferikos Omilos
1921–22	Panellinios Podosferikos Omilos
1922–23	Piraikos Syndesmos (The only panhellenic championship organized by EPSE before the establishment of the HFF)
1923–24	APS Piraeus (The final for the Greek champion with Aris, was not held, so APS Piraeus was declared champion)
1924–25	2 Champions (Panathinaïkos Athens, Olympiacos Piraeus, no tournament Thessaloniki )
1925–26	3 Champions (Panathinaïkos Athens, Olympiacos Piraeus, Aris Thessaloniki)
1926–27	3 Champions (Panathinaïkos Athens, Olympiacos Piraeus, Iraklis Thessaloniki)

=== HFF Panhellenic Championship ===
- 1927–28 to 1958–59

Season	Winner (number of titles)	Runner-up
1927–28	Aris (1)	Ethnikos Piraeus
1928–29	Not Held	
1929–30	Panathinaikos (1)	Aris
1930–31	Olympiacos (1)	Panathinaikos
1931–32	Aris (2)	Panathinaikos
1932–33	Olympiacos (2)	Aris
1933–34	Olympiacos (3)	Iraklis
1934–35	Not Finished	
1935–36	Olympiacos (4)	Panathinaikos
1936–37	Olympiacos (5)	PAOK
1937–38	Olympiacos (6)	Apollon Athens
1938–39	AEK Athens (1)	Iraklis
1939–40	AEK Athens (2)	PAOK
1940–41	Not Finished due to World War II	
1941–42	Not Held due to World War II	
1942–43	Not Finished due to World War II	
1943–44	Not Held due to World War II	
1944–45	Not Held due to World War II	
1945–46	Aris (3)	AEK Athens
1946–47	Olympiacos (7)	Iraklis
1947–48	Olympiacos (8)	Apollon Athens
1948–49	Panathinaikos (2)	Olympiacos
1949–50	Not Held	
1950–51	Olympiacos (9)	Panionios
1951–52	Not Held	
1952–53	Panathinaikos (3)	Olympiacos
1953–54	Olympiacos (10)	Panathinaikos
1954–55	Olympiacos (11)	Panathinaikos
1955–56	Olympiacos (12)	Ethnikos Piraeus
1956–57	Olympiacos (13)	Panathinaikos
1957–58	Olympiacos (14)	AEK Athens
1958–59	Olympiacos (15)	AEK Athens

=== Alpha Ethniki ===
- 1959–60 to 1978–79

Season	Winner (number of titles)	Runner-up	Third place	Top Scorer (team) (Goals) [Goal Average]
1959–60	Panathinaikos (4)	AEK Athens	Olympiacos	(Greece) Kostas Nestoridis (AEK Athens) (30) [1.13]
1960–61	Panathinaikos (5)	Olympiacos	Panionios	(Greece) Kostas Nestoridis (AEK Athens) (27) [0.90]
1961–62	Panathinaikos (6)	Olympiacos	Apollon Athens	(Greece) Kostas Nestoridis (AEK Athens) (29) [0.96]
1962–63	AEK Athens (3)	Panathinaikos	Olympiacos	(Greece) Kostas Nestoridis (AEK Athens) (23) [0.77]
1963–64	Panathinaikos (7)	Olympiacos	AEK Athens	(Greece) Mimis Papaioannou (AEK Athens) (29) [0.96]
1964–65	Panathinaikos (8)	AEK Athens	Olympiacos	(Greece) Giorgos Sideris (Olympiacos) (29) [0.96]
1965–66	Olympiacos (16)	Panathinaikos	AEK Athens	(Greece) Mimis Papaioannou (AEK Athens) (23) [0.79]
1966–67	Olympiacos (17)	AEK Athens	Panathinaikos	(Greece) Giorgos Sideris (Olympiacos) (24) [0.80]
1967–68	AEK Athens (4)	Olympiacos	Panathinaikos	(Greece) Thanasis Intzoglou (Panionios) (24) [0.70]
1968–69	Panathinaikos (9)	Olympiacos	Aris	(Greece) Giorgos Sideris (Olympiacos) (35) [1.03]
1969–70	Panathinaikos (10)	AEK Athens	Olympiacos	(Greece) Antonis Antoniadis (Panathinaikos) (25) [0.74]
1970–71	AEK Athens (5)	Panionios	Panathinaikos	(Greece) Georgios Dedes (Panionios) (28) [0.82]
1971–72	Panathinaikos (11)	Olympiacos	AEK Athens	(Greece) Antonis Antoniadis (Panathinaikos) (39) [1.14]
1972–73	Olympiacos (18)	PAOK	Panathinaikos	(Greece) Antonis Antoniadis (Panathinaikos) (22) [0.64]
1973–74	Olympiacos (19)	Panathinaikos	Aris	(Greece) Antonis Antoniadis (Panathinaikos) (26) [0.76]
1974–75	Olympiacos (20)	AEK Athens	PAOK	(Greece) Antonis Antoniadis (Panathinaikos), (Uruguay) Roberto Calcadera (Ethnikos Piraeus) (20) [0.58]
1975–76	PAOK (1)	AEK Athens	Olympiacos	(Greece) Giorgos Dedes (AEK Athens) (15) [0.50]
1976–77	Panathinaikos (12)	Olympiacos	PAOK	(Greece) Thanasis Intzoglou (Ethnikos Piraeus), (Greece) Dimitris Papadopoulos (OFI) (22) [0.64]
1977–78	AEK Athens (6)	PAOK	Panathinaikos	(Greece) Thomas Mavros (AEK Athens) (22) [0.64]
1978–79	AEK Athens (7)	Olympiacos	Aris	(Greece) Thomas Mavros (AEK Athens) (31) [0.91]

=== Alpha Ethniki - Professional league ===
- 1979–80 to 2005–06

Season	Winner (number of titles)	Runner-up	Third place	Top Scorer (team) (Goals) [Goal Average]
1979–80	Olympiacos (21)	Aris	Panathinaikos	(Socialist Federal Republic of Yugoslavia) Dušan Bajević (AEK Athens) (25) [0.73]
1980–81	Olympiacos (22)	AEK Athens	Aris	(Greece) Dinos Kouis (Aris) (21) [0.61]
1981–82	Olympiacos (23)	Panathinaikos	PAOK	(Greece) Grigoris Charalampidis (Panathinaikos) (21) [0.61]
1982–83	Olympiacos (24)	Larissa	AEK Athens	(Greece) Nikos Anastopoulos (Olympiacos) (29) [0.93]
1983–84	Panathinaikos (13)	Olympiacos	Iraklis	(Greece) Nikos Anastopoulos (Olympiacos) (18) [0.60]
1984–85	PAOK (2)	Panathinaikos	AEK Athens	(Greece) Thomas Mavros (AEK Athens) (27) [0.90]
1985–86	Panathinaikos (14)	OFI	AEK Athens	(Greece) Nikos Anastopoulos (Olympiacos) (19) [0.63]
1986–87	Olympiacos (25)	Panathinaikos	OFI	(Greece) Nikos Anastopoulos (Olympiacos) (16) [0.53]
1987–88	AEL (1)	AEK Athens	PAOK	(Denmark) Henrik Nielsen (AEK Athens) (20) [0.66]
1988–89	AEK Athens (8)	Olympiacos	Panathinaikos	(Hungary) Imre Boda (Olympiacos Volos) (20) [0.66]
1989–90	Panathinaikos (15)	AEK Athens	PAOK	(Greece) Thomas Mavros (Panionios) (22) [0.64]
1990–91	Panathinaikos (16)	Olympiacos	AEK Athens	(Greece) Dimitris Saravakos (Panathinaikos) (23) [0.67]
1991–92	AEK Athens (9)	Olympiacos	Panathinaikos	(Greece) Vasilis Dimitriadis (AEK Athens) (28) [0.82]
1992–93	AEK Athens (10)	Panathinaikos	Olympiacos	(Greece) Vasilis Dimitriadis (AEK Athens) (33) [0.97]
1993–94	AEK Athens (11)	Panathinaikos	Olympiacos	(Greece) Alexandros Alexandris (AEK Athens), (Poland) Krzysztof Warzycha (Panathinaikos) (24) [0.70]
1994–95	Panathinaikos (17)	Olympiacos	PAOK	(Poland) Krzysztof Warzycha (Panathinaikos) (29) [0.85]
1995–96	Panathinaikos (18)	AEK Athens	Olympiacos	(Greece) Vasilios Tsiartas (AEK Athens) (26) [0.76]
1996–97	Olympiacos (26)	AEK Athens	OFI	(Greece) Alexandros Alexandris (Olympiacos) (23) [0.67]
1997–98	Olympiacos (27)	Panathinaikos	AEK Athens	(Poland) Krzysztof Warzycha (Panathinaikos) (32) [0.94]
1998–99	Olympiacos (28)	AEK Athens	Panathinaikos	(Greece) Demis Nikolaidis (AEK Athens) (22) [0.64]
1999–00	Olympiacos (29)	Panathinaikos	AEK Athens	(Greece) Dimitris Nalitzis (Panionios, PAOK) (24) [0.71]
2000–01	Olympiacos (30)	Panathinaikos	AEK Athens	(Greece) Alexandros Alexandris (Olympiacos) (19) [0.63]
2001–02	Olympiacos (31)	AEK Athens	Panathinaikos	(Greece) Alexandros Alexandris (Olympiacos) (19) [0.73]
2002–03	Olympiacos (32)	Panathinaikos	AEK Athens	(Greece) Nikos Liberopoulos (Panathinaikos) (16) [0.53]
2003–04	Panathinaikos (19)	Olympiacos	PAOK	(Brazil) Giovanni Silva de Oliveira (Olympiacos) (21) [0.70]
2004–05	Olympiacos (33)	Panathinaikos	AEK Athens	(Greece) Theofanis Gekas (Panathinaikos) (18) [0.60]
2005–06	Olympiacos (34)	AEK Athens	Panathinaikos	(Greece) Dimitris Salpingidis (PAOK) (17) [0.57]

=== Super League Greece ===
- 2006–07 to present

Season	Winner (number of titles)	Runner-up	Third place	Top Scorer (team) (Goals) [Goal Average]
2006–07	Olympiacos (35)	AEK Athens	Panathinaikos	(Greece) Nikos Liberopoulos (AEK Athens) (18) [0.60]
2007–08	Olympiacos (36)	Panathinaikos	AEK Athens	(Argentina) Ismael Blanco (AEK Athens) (19) [0.63]
2008–09	Olympiacos (37)	Panathinaikos	AEK Athens	(Argentina) Ismael Blanco (AEK Athens) (14) [0.47], (Argentina) Luciano Galletti (Olympiacos)
2009–10	Panathinaikos (20)	PAOK	AEK Athens	(France) Djibril Cissé (Panathinaikos) (23) [0.77]
2010–11	Olympiacos (38)	Panathinaikos	PAOK	(France) Djibril Cissé (Panathinaikos) (20) [0.67]
2011–12	Olympiacos (39)	Panathinaikos	AEK Athens	(Belgium) Kevin Mirallas (Olympiacos) (22) [0.73]
2012–13	Olympiacos (40)	PAOK	Atromitos	(Algeria) Rafik Djebbour (Olympiacos) (20) [0.67]
2013–14	Olympiacos (41)	Panathinaikos	PAOK	(Argentina) Esteban Solari (Skoda Xanthi) (16) [0.52]
2014–15	Olympiacos (42)	Panathinaikos	Asteras Tripolis	(Argentina) Jerónimo Barrales (Asteras Tripolis) (17) [0.63]
2015–16	Olympiacos (43)	PAOK	Panathinaikos	(Greece) Kostas Fortounis (Olympiacos) (18) [0.64]
2016–17	Olympiacos (44)	AEK Athens	Panathinaikos	(Sweden) Marcus Berg (Panathinaikos) (22)
2017–18	AEK Athens (12)	PAOK	Olympiacos	(Serbia) Aleksandar Prijović (PAOK) (19)
2018–19	PAOK (3)	Olympiacos	AEK Athens	(Greece) Efthimis Koulouris (Atromitos) (19)
2019–20	Olympiacos (45)	PAOK	AEK Athens	(Morocco) Youssef El-Arabi (Olympiacos) (20)
2020–21	Olympiacos (46)	PAOK	Aris	(Morocco) Youssef El-Arabi (Olympiacos) (22)
2021–22	Olympiacos (47)	PAOK	Aris	(Netherlands) Tom van Weert (Volos) (17)
2022–23	AEK Athens (13)	Panathinaikos	Olympiacos	(Democratic Republic of the Congo) Cédric Bakambu (Olympiacos) (18)
2023–24	PAOK (4)	AEK Athens	Olympiacos	(Spain) Loren Morón (Aris) (20)
2024–25	Olympiacos (48)	Panathinaikos	PAOK	(Spain) Jefté Betancor (Panserraikos) (19)
2025-26	AEK Athens (14)	Olympiacos	PAOK	(Morocco) Ayoub El Kaabi (Olympiacos) (18)

== Top three ranking ==
Location of Greek football champions

Ranking by top three finishes in the National League since 1959–60.

Club	1st	2nd	3rd
Olympiacos	33	15	11
Panathinaikos	17	21	14
AEK Athens	12	17	18
PAOK	4	9	11
AEL	1	1	–
Aris	–	1	6
OFI	–	1	2
Panionios	–	1	1
Apollon Athens	–	–	1
Asteras Tripolis	–	–	1
Atromitos	–	–	1
Iraklis	–	–	1

Ranking by top three finishes in the Greek Championship since 1927–28.

Club	1st	2nd	3rd	Top 3 overall
Olympiacos	48	17	13	78
Panathinaikos	20	27	17	64
AEK Athens	14	20	20	54
PAOK	4	11	11	26
Aris	3	3	10	16
AEL	1	1	–	2
Iraklis	–	3	2	5
Apollon Athens	–	2	5	7
Panionios	–	2	3	5
Ethnikos	–	2	–	2
OFI	–	1	2	3
Atromitos	–	–	2	2
Asteras Tripolis	–	–	1	1
