= Super League Greece =

First-tier professional men's association football league in Greece

Super League 1
- Organising body: Super League 1 Greece Limited Liability Partnership
- Founded: 1927; 99 years ago (officially); 2006; 20 years ago (as Super League)
- Country: Greece
- Confederation: UEFA
- Number of clubs: 14 (since 2019–20)
- Level on pyramid: 1
- Relegation to: Super League 2
- Domestic cups: Greek Cup; Greek Super Cup
- International cups: UEFA Champions League; UEFA Europa League; UEFA Conference League
- Current champions: AEK Athens (14th title) (2025–26)
- Most championships: Olympiacos (48 titles)
- Most appearances: Mimis Domazos (535)
- Top scorer: Thomas Mavros (260 goals)
- Broadcasters: Novasports, Magenta Sport, SportFM TV (Skai TV)
- Sponsor: Stoiximan
- Website: slgr.gr
- Current: 2026–27 Super League Greece

The Super League 1 (Greek: Σούπερ Λιγκ 1), officially known as A1 Ethniki Katigoria (Greek: Α1 Εθνική Κατηγορία, lit. 'A1 National Division') and currently named Stoiximan Super League due to sponsorship reasons, is a professional association football league in Greece and the highest level of the Greek football league system. Formed on 16 July 2006, it replaced Alpha Ethniki Katigoria as the country's first tier league. The members of the cooperative are the Football Anonymous Companies (P.A.E.) that have the right to participate in the Super League 1 championship. The president of Super League is Giannis Alafouzos.

It consists of 14 teams and runs from August to May, with teams playing 26 games each followed by 6-game Championship play-offs to decide the champions.

As of March 2026, Super League Greece is ranked 11th in the UEFA ranking of leagues, based on performances in European competitions over the last five years.

Since the foundation of the first official Panhellenic Championship in 1927, only six clubs have won the title: Olympiacos, Panathinaikos, AEK, PAOK, Aris and AEL. With 48 conquests, Olympiacos has the most titles in the history of the competition.

The current champions are AEK Athens, who won their 14th title in the 2025–26 season.

== History ==
=== Origins ===
Football first appeared in Greece in 1894 and began to spread after the 1896 Olympiad, which was included in the games program. Many clubs started to establish football divisions while the first purely football clubs were also founded. The first years, until 1912, championship was organised by the Hellenic Association of Amateur Athletics (SEGAS). This championship was actually a local tournament among clubs from Athens and Piraeus.

After the Balkan Wars and World War I, two football associations were formed, one organising a football league in Athens and Piraeus, and one doing the same in Thessaloniki. These were the Athens-Piraeus FCA (EPSAP) and the Macedonia FCA (EPSM). In 1923, a Panhellenic Champion was determined by a play-off game between the Athens-Piraeus and the Thessaloniki champions. Peiraikos Syndesmos won 3–1 against Aris. This panhellenic final was not repeated the following year as the EPSAP was split into the Athens FCA (EPSA) and Piraeus FCA (EPSP) following a dispute.

=== Panhellenic Championship (1927–1959) ===
On 14 November 1926, the Hellenic Football Federation is founded and organizes the first Panhellenic Championship in the period 1927–28, in which, however, Olympiacos, Panathinaikos and AEK Athens did not participate due to conflicts with the EPO.

The initial events were held with teams from Athens, Piraeus and Thessaloniki, excluding the provincial ones. Previously, the local championships of the cities were held and in the final phase, sometimes only the first ones qualified, sometimes the first two or the first three teams. In the championship of 1938-39, which was held in two groups, teams outside Athens-Thessaloniki (Doxa Drama, AEK Kavala and Filippi Kavala) participated for the first time. The maiden presence of provincial teams in a single group of the Panhellenic Championship took place in 1953-54 with the participation of Panachaiki from Southern Greece and Niki Volos from Central and Northern Greece.

=== Overall Rating of the Panhellenic Championship (1927-1959) ===
| Pos. | Team | G. | W. | D. | L. | Go. | P. |
|---|---|---|---|---|---|---|---|
| 1 | Olympiacos | 242 | 166 | 39 | 37 | 565–229 | 537 (515)* |
| 2 | Panathinaikos | 210 | 120 | 36 | 54 | 449–247 | 421 (396) |
| 3 | AEK Athens | 169 | 79 | 35 | 55 | 318–277 | 289 (272) |
| 4 | PAOK | 174 | 61 | 35 | 78 | 275–287 | 273 (218)** |
| 5 | Apollon Smyrnis | 166 | 73 | 26 | 67 | 270–260 | 272 (245) |
| 6 | Ethnikos Piraeus | 168 | 66 | 35 | 69 | 273–252 | 259 (233) |
| 7 | Aris | 151 | 62 | 36 | 53 | 295–232 | 238 (222) |
| 8 | Iraklis | 112 | 43 | 20 | 49 | 182–193 | 158 (149) |
| 9 | Panionios | 72 | 29 | 15 | 28 | 124–110 | 145 (102) |
| 10 | Doxa Drama | 74 | 21 | 20 | 33 | 102–128 | 136 (83) |
| 11 | Proodeftiki | 54 | 15 | 09 | 30 | 74–112 | 93 (54) |
| 12 | Apollon Kalamarias | 40 | 17 | 03 | 20 | 49–50 | 77 (54) |
| 13 | Asteras Athens | 54 | 15 | 09 | 30 | 38–66 | 54 (48) |
| 14 | OFI | 30 | 3 | 5 | 22 | 30–83 | 14 (41) |
| 15 | Niki Volos | 18 | 6 | 4 | 8 | 15–24 | 22 (34) |
| 16 | Panegialios | 18 | 2 | 7 | 9 | 15–29 | 13 (29) |
| 17 | Philippoi Kavala | 16 | 5 | 1 | 10 | 28–42 | 16 (27) |
| 18 | Panachaiki | 18 | 2 | 4 | 12 | 14–42 | 10 (26) |
| 19 | Athinaikos | 14 | 2 | 4 | 8 | 12–32 | 10 (22) |
| 20 | A.E. Kavala | 10 | 4 | 0 | 6 | 11–18 | 12 (18) |
| 21 | Atromitos Piraeus | 10 | 3 | 2 | 5 | 12–21 | 11 (18) |
| 22 | Aris Nikaia | 14 | 1 | 0 | 13 | 11–54 | 3 (16) |
| 23 | Panargiakos | 18 | 0 | 0 | 18 | 7–76 | 0 (18) |
| 24 | Atromitos | 18 | 1 | 1 | 16 | 13–70 | 4 (15) |
| 25 | Goudi Athens | 20 | 4 | 3 | 13 | 25–82 | 15 (11) |
| 26 | Olympiacos Loutraki | 8 | 2 | 0 | 6 | 12–29 | 6 (11) |
| 27 | Olympiacos Volos | 10 | 1 | 0 | 9 | 9–30 | 3 (11) |
| 28 | Panetolikos | 10 | 1 | 0 | 9 | 6–35 | 3 (11) |
| 29 | Olympiacos Chalkida | 8 | 1 | 0 | 7 | 8–24 | 3 (10) |
| 30 | Fostiras | 8 | 1 | 0 | 7 | 7–16 | 3 (10) |
| 31 | Iraklis Serres | 4 | 2 | 0 | 2 | 12–13 | 6 (8) |
| 32 | Makedonikos | 10 | 0 | 0 | 10 | 13–36 | 0 (8) |
| 33 | Aspida Xanthi | 4 | 1 | 1 | 2 | 7–16 | 4 (7) |
| 34 | Orfeas Xanthi | 6 | 0 | 1 | 5 | 2–21 | 1 (7) |
| 35 | Megas Alexandros Thessaloniki | 16 | 0 | 1 | 15 | 17–84 | 1 (1) |

- The score in parentheses is the teams' actual score, adjusted for all scoring systems, penalties, etc. The first score is with the 3-1-0 system for convenience.

=== National League (1959–1979) ===
In 1959 the Alpha Ethniki – the precursor of the current Super League – was set up as a national round-robin tournament. After several months of talks, the 1959–60 championship was the first nationwide league competition. It started on Sunday 25 October 1959 with the participation of 16 teams. The creation of a championship in the form of a single permanent national division rather than the way they have been held until then with the participation of the teams selected by the local competitions was a requirement of both the State and UEFA. The first wished to establish a fixed number of matches every Sunday in Greece to stimulate interest in PRO-PO while UEFA wished to nominate national champions with strict criteria and through joint events for all states. The Hellenic Football Federation (HFF) was obliged to proceed to the abolition of the competitions of the Football Clubs Associations (EPS) of Greece as qualifying stages for the Pan-Hellenic Championship. The first place was taken by Alpha Ethniki, a single division with clubs from all over the Greek territory and a stable participation, with the exception of those who would be relegated at the end of the season. The initial design provided for a number of teams well above the 10th of the 1958–59 Pan-Hellenic Championship and in particular 18 which, as the expanded division calendar would cover almost all the available dates of the year, would no longer participate in its local competitions their EPSs. Those would be the qualifier for the upcoming national division and not the participation in the final round of the current championship, so their significance was significantly reduced. On Saturday, 10 October 1959 at the General Assembly of the HFF, i.e. with the participation of all the members of the Association of Football Associations and in the presence of the General Secretariat of Sports (GGA) and representatives of the Karamanlis government, became the first national division of Greek football. The 1st game was set for 15 days. According to the general Assembly of HFF on 29 August 1959, it was decided that the newly created Alpha Ethniki would consist of 18 teams, with their determination being made in accordance with the positions in the local EPS competitions in the period 1958–59. The HFF, at its decisive General Assembly on Saturday, 10 October, decided to reduce the number of teams to 16 so that the racing program will not be extended in the summer. After the end of the first event in the summer of 1960, the teams did not increase despite HFF's initial intention, with the number 16 being considered the ideal for a championship in Greece and only 18 in 1967.

The teams that participated in the first championship of the Alpha Ethniki were the following:

- The top four of the Athens FCA Championship: Panathinaikos, Panionios, AEK Athens and Apollon Smyrnis.
- The top four of the Piraeus FCA Championship: Olympiacos, Ethnikos Piraeus, AE Nikaia and Proodeftiki.
- The top four of the Macedonia FCA (Thessaloniki) Championship: Aris, PAOK, Apollon Kalamarias and Iraklis.
- The top two of the North Group of the Regional Championship: Doxa Drama and Megas Alexandros Katerini.
- The first of the two Sub-Groups of the South Regional Championship: Pankorinthiakos and Panegialios.

On 25 October 1959, the Alpha Ethniki was launched. Panathinaikos won the first Alpha Ethniki's Championship and became the Greek champions for the fourth time in his history. The club tied with AEK by 79 points and defeated them by 2–1 in the play-off, a match where Panathinaikos needed only a draw at the neutral Karaiskakis Stadium. In such a case, after the half-hour extension, the competition announcement set the best goal difference. Through the playoffs and with the same score was also the third place for the demotion, with the winner Panegialios to overtake Pankorinthiakos again in the event of a draw. The scoring system was 3 points for the win, 2 points for the draw, 1 point for the defeat.

Time has been relentless for some teams that have participated in the first league of the Alpha Ethniki. The historic Ethnikos Piraeus, cup winner of Greece in 1933, participates in the Gamma Ethniki, as well as Proodeftiki while AE Nikaia participates in the local championship of Piraeus. Apollon Kalamaria, Doxa Drama and Iraklis are fighting in the Beta Ethniki, while Pankorinthiakos, a few years after joining Alpha Ethniki, merged with Aris Korinthos and created PAS Korinthos, which reached the Alpha Ethniki at the 1990s and is now participating in the Gamma Ethniki. Megas Alexandros Katerini is the ancestor of Pierikos. In 1961, they merged with Olympos Katerini and created Pierikos who plays in the Gamma Ethniki.

=== Professional League (1979–present) ===
On 19 January 1979 a bill was passed in the Hellenic Parliament under which football clubs became Football Incorporated Companies (PAE or ΠΑΕ in Greek). The Association of Football Incorporated Companies (EPAE, ΕΠΑΕ in Greek), under the supervision of the HFF, has since held the responsibility to hold the championship, with Makis Ithakisios being elected its first president. Initially the shares were owned by the sports union to which the football club belonged. Yet soon after, prominent Greek businessmen (shipowners, oil magnates, bankers etc.) began acquiring the newly formed PAEs by buying the majority of their shares, and then increasing their share capital, thus turning Greek football into a fully commercialised and highly profitable business for the decades to come.

For a single racing season, 2000–01, the championship is renamed "Upper Category". It was an attempt to restructure the Greek football leagues, which included a gradual reduction of the teams in the Greek league and was announced at the end of 1999 by the then president of the Football Association of Societies (E.P.A.E.) Viktoras Mitropoulos. It was based on a plan developed on behalf of EPAE. the international company "Deloitte & Touche". However, it was never completed and a simple renaming of the leagues was only valid for the 2000–2001 season, which was abolished the following season.

==== Super League (2006–2019) ====
On 16 July 2006, was founded the copartnership Super League. Members of the copartnership are the PAE's that have the right to participate in the professional football championship of the First Division. The main activity of the copartnership is the organization and conduct of the First Division's Championship according to the regulations and decisions of the Hellenic Football Federation (HFF) and the supreme international football confederations (UEFA, FIFA). From the 2007–08 season, the play-offs were established for the exit of the teams in Europe (places 2–5).

==== Super League 1 (2019–Today) ====
With the restructuring of 2019, from the period 2019–2020 the professional football association "Super League Greece Limited Liability Company" was renamed to "Super League 1 Greece Limited Liability Company". Playoffs are established to determine the champion, among the top six teams in the league. At the same time, the use of the V.A.R. was established.

== Competition format ==
From 2024–2025 season, 14 clubs compete in the Super League, playing each other in a 26-game home and away series. At the end of the season, the top 4 clubs face each other in a 6-game championship round to decide the Super League champions but also the teams to enter the UEFA Champions League, UEFA Europa League and the UEFA Conference League competitions.

After the end of the regular season, the teams ranked 5 through 8 participate in the Europe play-offs, to determine the last available spot for next year's UEFA Conference League 2nd qualifying round, assuming that the Greek Football Cup winner finishes in the top 4, since Super League Greece is entitled to 5 entrants in 2025-26 UEFA Competitions.

The bottom 6 clubs face each other in play-outs to decide who gets relegated to Super League 2. In their place, the top two teams from Super League 2 are promoted. The number of teams to be relegated may change, depending on a licensing procedure that takes place at the end of the regular season.

== Tickets for European Competitions ==
The Super League for the 2026–27 season, is entitled to two entrants into the UEFA Champions League. The reigning champions AEK Athens qualified for the 2026–27 UEFA Champions League play-off round.

The second-placed team, Olympiacos, will enter the 2026–27 UEFA Champions League third qualifying round in league path.

The 2025–26 Greek Cup winner OFI qualified for the 2026–27 UEFA Europa League play-off round.

The third-placed team in the championship, PAOK, qualified for the 2026–27 UEFA Europa League second qualifying round

Panathinaikos, who finished 4th in the 2025–26 season, qualified for the 2026–27 UEFA Conference League second qualifying round.

== Criticism ==
The Greek Super League has, throughout its history, grappled with persistent allegations of corruption, fraud, and match-fixing, casting a shadow over the integrity of Greek football. Over the past two decades, various scandals, such as Koriopolis, 2015 Greek football match-fixing scandal and Paranga, have stained the league's reputation, prompting interventions from UEFA, the Greek Federation, and the government itself.

The allegations of team officials being involved in match-fixing has been a matter of concern for both the media and the judiciary. The lack of decisive action in the form of legal consequences for those involved has been a glaring issue. Notably, no officials have been sentenced for their alleged involvement in these illicit activities, raising concerns among experts, politicians and journalists alike. Instances of violence have further exacerbated the situation, with attacks on referees, bombings targeting the properties of match officials, and a disturbing array of physical assaults designed to coerce officials into participating in match-fixing schemes. Furthermore, over the past few years, several fans have been murdered due to a combination of assaults and police negligence. Simultaneously, police officers have also become targets of violence.

Critics argue that the absence of legal repercussions for implicated officials serves as compelling evidence of a more extensive and deeply rooted systemic corruption within the football governing bodies and the broader justice system of the country.

== Clubs ==
=== 2026–27 season ===
The following 14 clubs compete in the Super League in the 2026–27 season.

Locations of the 2026–27 Super League Greece 1 teams

Note: Table includes the 2026–27 season.

| Club | Location | 2025–26 season | Stadium | Stadium Capacity | Manager |
|---|---|---|---|---|---|
| AEK Athens | Athens | 1st | Agia Sophia Stadium | 32,500 | Marko Nikolić |
| A.E. Kifisia | Athens | 10th | Leoforos Alexandras Stadium | 16,003 | Sebastian Leto |
| Aris | Thessaloniki | 5th | Kleanthis Vikelidis Stadium | 22,800 | Michalis Grigoriou |
| Asteras Tripolis | Tripoli | 11th | Theodoros Kolokotronis Stadium | 7,423 | Georgios Antonopoulos |
| Atromitos | Athens | 9th | Peristeri Stadium | 9,050 | Dušan Kerkez |
| Iraklis | Thessaloniki | 1st (North Group SL2) | Kaftanzoglio Stadium | 27,560 | Walter Mazzarri |
| Kalamata | Kalamata | 1st (South Group SL2) | Kalamata Municipal Stadium | 4,496 | Panagiotis Christofileas |
| Levadiakos | Levadia | 6th | Levadia Municipal Stadium | 5,915 | Elias Charalambous |
| OFI | Heraklion | 7th | Pankritio Stadium | 26,240 | Christos Kontis |
| Olympiacos | Piraeus | 2nd | Karaiskakis Stadium | 33,334 | José Luis Mendilibar |
| Panathinaikos | Athens | 4th | Athens Olympic Stadium | 69,618 | Jacob Neestrup |
| Panetolikos | Agrinio | 12th | Panetolikos Stadium | 7,321 | Giannis Anastasiou |
| PAOK | Thessaloniki | 3rd | Toumba Stadium | 28,703 | Alessio Lisci |
| Volos | Volos | 8th | Panthessaliko Stadium | 22,700 | Kostas Bratsos |

== Champions ==
=== The Championship through the years ===
==== Unofficial Championships (not recognised by the HFF) ====
- 1905–06 to 1913–14: SEGAS Championship
- 1921–22 to 1926–27: Greece FCA Championship and in between 1922–23: EPSE Championship

==== Greek Championship (1927–present) ====
Panhellenic Championship

- Period: From 1927–28 to 1958–59
- Format: Regional Leagues followed by final stage playoffs between the winners/top ranked teams

National League

- Period: From 1959–60 to 1978–79
- Format: A national round-robin league tournament with amateur or semi-professional players
- Name: Alpha Ethniki Katigoria (A' National Division)

Professional League

- Period: From 1979–80 to present
- Format: A national round-robin league tournament followed occasionally by playoffs/playouts with professional players
- Name(s):

i) From 1979–80 to 2005–06, Alpha Ethniki Katigoria (A' National Division)

In between the league was named Upper Category for the 2000–01 season

ii) From 2006–07 to 2018–19, Super League Greece

iii) From 2019–20 to present, Super League 1 (The use of VAR is established)

== SEGAS, FCA and EPSE championships ==
SEGAS championship
| 1905–06 | Ethnikos Athens |
| 1906–07 | Ethnikos Athens |
| 1907–08 | Goudi Athens |
| 1908–09 | Peiraikos Syndesmos |
| 1909–10 | Goudi Athens |
| 1910–11 | Podosferikos Omilos Athinon |
| 1911–12 | Panellinios Podosferikos Omilos |
| 1912–13 | Goudi Athens |
| 1913–14 | Athinaikos SP |
| 1914–15 | Not held (WW1) |
| 1915–16 | Not held (WW1) |
| 1916–17 | Not finished (WW1) |
| 1917–18 | Not held (WW1) |
| 1918–19 | Not held (WW1) |
| 1919–20 | Not held (WW1) |

Greece FCA championship
| 1920–21 | Panellinios Podosferikos Omilos |
| 1921–22 | Panellinios Podosferikos Omilos |
| 1923–24 | APS Piraeus |
| 1924–25 | 2 champions (Panathinaïkos Athens, Olympiacos Piraeus, no tournament Thessaloniki ) |
| 1925–26 | 3 champions (Panathinaïkos Athens, Olympiacos Piraeus, Aris Thessaloniki) |
| 1926–27 | 3 champions (Panathinaïkos Athens, Olympiacos Piraeus, Iraklis Thessaloniki) |

EPSE Championship
| 1922–23 | Peiraikos Syndesmos (The only Panhellenic Championship organized by EPSE before the establishment of the HFF) |

== Greek Championship ==
Panhellenic Championship

| Season | Champion |
|---|---|
| 1927–28 | Aris |
| 1928–29 | Not held |
| 1929–30 | Panathinaikos |
| 1930–31 | Olympiacos |
| 1931–32 | Aris |
| 1932–33 | Olympiacos |
| 1933–34 | Olympiacos |
| 1934–35 | Not finished |
| 1935–36 | Olympiacos |
| 1936–37 | Olympiacos |
| 1937–38 | Olympiacos |
| 1938–39 | AEK Athens |
| 1939–40 | AEK Athens |
| 1940–41 | Not finished (WW2) |
| 1942–1945 | Not held (WW2) |
| 1945–46 | Aris |
| 1946–47 | Olympiacos |
| 1947–48 | Olympiacos |
| 1948–49 | Panathinaikos |
| 1949–50 | Not held |
| 1950–51 | Olympiacos |
| 1951–52 | Not held |
| 1952–53 | Panathinaikos |
| 1953–54 | Olympiacos |
| 1954–55 | Olympiacos |
| 1955–56 | Olympiacos |
| 1956–57 | Olympiacos |
| 1957–58 | Olympiacos |
| 1958–59 | Olympiacos |

National League
(Alpha Ethniki)

| Season | Champion |
|---|---|
| 1959–60 | Panathinaikos |
| 1960–61 | Panathinaikos |
| 1961–62 | Panathinaikos |
| 1962–63 | AEK Athens |
| 1963–64 | Panathinaikos |
| 1964–65 | Panathinaikos |
| 1965–66 | Olympiacos |
| 1966–67 | Olympiacos |
| 1967–68 | AEK Athens |
| 1968–69 | Panathinaikos |
| 1969–70 | Panathinaikos |
| 1970–71 | AEK Athens |
| 1971–72 | Panathinaikos |
| 1972–73 | Olympiacos |
| 1973–74 | Olympiacos |
| 1974–75 | Olympiacos |
| 1975–76 | PAOK |
| 1976–77 | Panathinaikos |
| 1977–78 | AEK Athens |
| 1978–79 | AEK Athens |

Professional League
(Alpha Ethniki)

| Season | Champion |
|---|---|
| 1979–80 | Olympiacos |
| 1980–81 | Olympiacos |
| 1981–82 | Olympiacos |
| 1982–83 | Olympiacos |
| 1983–84 | Panathinaikos |
| 1984–85 | PAOK |
| 1985–86 | Panathinaikos |
| 1986–87 | Olympiacos |
| 1987–88 | AEL |
| 1988–89 | AEK Athens |
| 1989–90 | Panathinaikos |
| 1990–91 | Panathinaikos |
| 1991–92 | AEK Athens |
| 1992–93 | AEK Athens |
| 1993–94 | AEK Athens |
| 1994–95 | Panathinaikos |
| 1995–96 | Panathinaikos |
| 1996–97 | Olympiacos |
| 1997–98 | Olympiacos |
| 1998–99 | Olympiacos |
| 1999–00 | Olympiacos |
| 2000–01 | Olympiacos |
| 2001–02 | Olympiacos |
| 2002–03 | Olympiacos |
| 2003–04 | Panathinaikos |
| 2004–05 | Olympiacos |
| 2005–06 | Olympiacos |

Super League
(Greece)

| Season | Champion |
|---|---|
| 2006–07 | Olympiacos |
| 2007–08 | Olympiacos |
| 2008–09 | Olympiacos |
| 2009–10 | Panathinaikos |
| 2010–11 | Olympiacos |
| 2011–12 | Olympiacos |
| 2012–13 | Olympiacos |
| 2013–14 | Olympiacos |
| 2014–15 | Olympiacos |
| 2015–16 | Olympiacos |
| 2016–17 | Olympiacos |
| 2017–18 | AEK Athens |
| 2018–19 | PAOK |
Super League 1
| 2019–20 | Olympiacos |
| 2020–21 | Olympiacos |
| 2021–22 | Olympiacos |
| 2022–23 | AEK Athens |
| 2023–24 | PAOK |
| 2024–25 | Olympiacos |
| 2025–26 | AEK Athens |

Source: epo.gr, rsssf.org.

== Performances ==
=== Performance by club (1927–present) ===
| Club | Champions | Winning years |
|---|---|---|
| Olympiacos | 48 | 1931, 1933, 1934, 1936, 1937, 1938, 1947, 1948, 1951, 1954, 1955, 1956, 1957, 1958, 1959, 1966, 1967, 1973, 1974, 1975, 1980, 1981, 1982, 1983, 1987, 1997, 1998, 1999, 2000, 2001, 2002, 2003, 2005, 2006, 2007, 2008, 2009, 2011, 2012, 2013, 2014, 2015, 2016, 2017, 2020, 2021, 2022, 2025 |
| Panathinaikos | 20 | 1930, 1949, 1953, 1960, 1961, 1962, 1964, 1965, 1969, 1970, 1972, 1977, 1984, 1986, 1990, 1991, 1995, 1996, 2004, 2010 |
| AEK Athens | 14 | 1939, 1940, 1963, 1968, 1971, 1978, 1979, 1989, 1992, 1993, 1994, 2018, 2023, 2026 |
| PAOK | 4 | 1976, 1985, 2019, 2024 |
| Aris | 3 | 1928, 1932, 1946 |
| AEL | 1 | 1988 |

Source: rsssf.org

=== Performance by city (1927–present) ===
The six clubs that have won the championship are from a total of four cities:

| City | Titles | Clubs |
|---|---|---|
| Piraeus | 48 | Olympiacos (48) |
| Athens | 34 | Panathinaikos (20), AEK Athens (14) |
| Thessaloniki | 7 | PAOK (4), Aris (3) |
| Larissa | 1 | AEL (1) |

=== Performance by region (1927–present) ===
The six clubs that have won the championship are from a total of three regions:

| Region | Titles | Clubs |
|---|---|---|
| Attica | 82 | Olympiacos (48), Panathinaikos (20), AEK Athens (14) |
| Central Macedonia | 7 | PAOK (4), Aris (3) |
| Thessaly | 1 | AEL (1) |

== Statistics ==
=== Top three ranking (1959–present) ===
| Club | 1st | 2nd | 3rd | Total |
|---|---|---|---|---|
| Olympiacos | 33 | 16 | 11 | 60 |
| Panathinaikos | 17 | 21 | 14 | 52 |
| AEK Athens | 12 | 17 | 18 | 47 |
| PAOK | 4 | 9 | 11 | 24 |
| AEL | 1 | 1 | – | 2 |
| Aris | – | 1 | 6 | 7 |
| OFI | – | 1 | 2 | 3 |
| Panionios | – | 1 | 1 | 2 |
| Apollon Smyrnis | – | – | 1 | 1 |
| Asteras Tripolis | – | – | 1 | 1 |
| Atromitos | – | – | 1 | 1 |
| Iraklis | – | – | 1 | 1 |

=== Seasons in National League ===
The number of seasons that each team (in alphabetical order) has played in the national top division from 1959–60 until 2026–27. A total of 70 teams had competed at least once in the national league. Olympiacos, Panathinaikos and PAOK are the only teams that have never been relegated and participated in every season since the league's inception in its modern form. The teams in bold will participate in the 2026–27 Super League.

| Seasons | Clubs |
|---|---|
| 68 | **Olympiacos**, **Panathinaikos**, **PAOK** |
| 66 | **AEK Athens** |
| 62 | **Aris** |
| 59 | Panionios |
| 54 | **Iraklis** |
| 50 | **OFI** |
| 42 | Apollon Smyrnis |
| 36 | Ethnikos Piraeus |
| 32 | AEL |
| 31 | Xanthi |
| 28 | PAS Giannina |
| 27 | Panserraikos |
| 26 | Panachaiki, **Atromitos** |
| 23 | Egaleo |
| 22 | **Levadiakos** |
| 21 | Doxa Drama |
| 20 | Apollon Kalamarias, **Asteras Tripolis** |
| 19 | Kavala |
| 18 | Ionikos |
| 17 | Veria, **Panetolikos** |
| 16 | Pierikos |
| 15 | Proodeftiki |
| 10 | Kastoria |
| 9 | Ergotelis, Athinaikos, Olympiacos Volos |
| 8 | Lamia, **Kalamata**, **Volos** |
| 7 | Fostiras, Paniliakos, Trikala |
| 6 | Panegialios, Panthrakikos, Niki Volos, Platanias |
| 5 | Edessaikos, Korinthos, Kerkyra, Athens Kallithea |
| 4 | Akratitos, Ethnikos Asteras, Rodos, Vyzas Megara |
| 3 | Diagoras, Olympiakos Nicosia, Panelefsiniakos, AEL Kalloni, AOK Kerkyra, **A.E. Kifisia** |
| 2 | Chalkidona |
| 1 | Olympiacos Chalkida, Atromitos Piraeus, Makedonikos, AEL Limassol, AE Nikaia, APOEL*, Chalkida, EPA Larnaca, Megas Alexandros Katerini, Naoussa, Omonia Nicosia, Pankorinthiakos, Thermaikos, Thrasyvoulos |

- APOEL avoided relegation in the 1973–74 season, but were forced to play in the Cypriot A Division the following season due to the Turkish invasion of Cyprus. Hence they are the only team to have played a single season in the Greek league and not been relegated.

=== Seasons in Panhellenic Championship final stage and National League ===
The number of seasons that each team (in alphabetical order) has played in the final stage of the Panhellenic Championship (1927–59) and also in the National League (1959–present). A total of 82 teams had competed at least one time. The teams in bold will participate in the 2026–27 Super League.

| Seasons | Clubs |
|---|---|
| 90 | **Olympiacos** |
| 85 | **Panathinaikos** |
| 81 | **PAOK** |
| 80 | **AEK Athens**, **Aris** |
| 64 | Panionios, **Iraklis** |
| 55 | Apollon Smyrnis |
| 51 | **OFI** |
| 49 | Ethnikos Piraeus |
| 32 | AEL |
| 31 | Xanthi |
| 28 | PAS Giannina, Panachaiki, **Atromitos** |
| 27 | Panserraikos |
| 26 | Doxa Drama |
| 23 | Egaleo |
| 22 | Apollon Kalamarias, **Levadiakos** |
| 20 | **Asteras Tripolis** |
| 19 | Kavala |
| 18 | Proodeftiki, Ionikos, **Panetolikos** |
| 17 | Veria |
| 16 | Pierikos |
| 10 | Kastoria, Athinaikos, Olympiacos Volos |
| 9 | Ergotelis |
| 8 | Fostiras, Niki Volos, Lamia, **Kalamata**, **Volos** |
| 7 | Paniliakos, Trikala |
| 6 | Panegialios, Panthrakikos, Platanias |
| 5 | Edessaikos, Korinthos, Kerkyra, Kallithea |
| 4 | Akratitos, Ethnikos Asteras, Rodos, Vyzas Megara |
| 3 | Megas Alexandros Thessaloniki, Diagoras, Olympiakos Nicosia, Panelefsiniakos, AEL Kalloni, AOK Kerkyra, **A.E. Kifisia** |
| 2 | Asteras Athens, Philippoi Kavala, Olympiacos Chalkida, Atromitos Piraeus, Makedonikos, Chalkidona |
| 1 | A.E. Kavala, Aris Piraeus, Aspida Xanthi, Orfeas Xanthi, Iraklis Serron, Panargiakos, Olympiakos Loutraki, Goudi Athens, AEL Limassol, AE Nikaia, APOEL*, Chalkida, EPA Larnaca, Megas Alexandros Katerini, Naoussa, Omonia Nicosia, Pankorinthiakos, Thermaikos, Thrasyvoulos |

== Top Division Table (since 1959–60) ==
This index is an overall record of all match results, points, and goals of the best ten teams that has played in Alpha Ethniki and Super League championships since 1959–60. The table is correct as of the end of the 2025–26 season. Points are based on 3–1–0 and no deductions are counted.

| Pos | Team | Seasons | Points | Played | Won | Drawn | Lost | G.F. | G.A. | G.D. | 1 | 2 | 3 | 1st App | Since/Last App | Best |
|---|---|---|---|---|---|---|---|---|---|---|---|---|---|---|---|---|
| 1 | Olympiacos | 67 | 4678 | 2132 | 1416 | 435 | 281 | 4321 | 1565 | 2742 | 33 | 16 | 11 | 1959–60 | 1959–60 | 1 |
| 2 | Panathinaikos | 67 | 4345 | 2133 | 1300 | 478 | 355 | 3963 | 1685 | 2278 | 17 | 21 | 14 | 1959–60 | 1959–60 | 1 |
| 3 | AEK Athens | 65 | 3997 | 2066 | 1208 | 478 | 380 | 3785 | 1789 | 1996 | 12 | 18 | 19 | 1959–60 | 2015–16 | 1 |
| 4 | PAOK | 67 | 3664 | 2133 | 1051 | 532 | 514 | 3307 | 2039 | 1278 | 4 | 9 | 11 | 1959–60 | 1959–60 | 1 |
| 5 | Aris | 61 | 2887 | 1953 | 788 | 538 | 627 | 2425 | 2123 | 302 | – | 1 | 6 | 1959–60 | 2018–19 | 2 |
| 6 | Panionios | 59 | 2411 | 1870 | 642 | 493 | 735 | 2202 | 2364 | −162 | – | 2 | 1 | 1959–60 | 2019–20 | 2 |
| 7 | Iraklis | 53 | 2401 | 1686 | 623 | 469 | 594 | 2099 | 2011 | 88 | – | – | 1 | 1959–60 | 2016–17 | 3 |
| 8 | OFI | 49 | 2004 | 1543 | 557 | 362 | 621 | 1910 | 2058 | −148 | – | 1 | 2 | 1968–69 | 2018–19 | 2 |
| 9 | Apollon Smyrnis | 43 | 1546 | 1359 | 397 | 361 | 601 | 1418 | 1802 | −384 | – | – | 1 | 1959–60 | 2021–22 | 3 |
| 10 | Ethnikos Piraeus | 36 | 1394 | 1164 | 356 | 326 | 482 | 1305 | 1552 | −247 | – | – | – | 1959–60 | 1998–99 | 4 |

== Per geographic region ==
All the geographic regions of Greece have been represented by at least one club in the first national division. Central Greece has had the strongest presence with 27 clubs overall, of which 22 come from Attica alone. Central Greece, Macedonia and the Peloponnese together contain almost three-quarters of the clubs that participated in the top flight. Between 1967 and 1974, the Cypriot champion also participated in the Greek top competition, and five different Cypriot clubs participated during those years. The Greek islands of Rhodes, Lesbos and Corfu have also been represented. A total of 74 clubs have participated at the first tier so far.

| Regions | Total | Teams |
|---|---|---|
| Central Greece | 29 | Attica: Olympiacos, Panathinaikos, AEK Athens, Panionios, Apollon Smyrnis, Ethnikos Piraeus, Egaleo, Ionikos, Atromitos, Proodeftiki, Athinaikos, Fostiras, Akratitos, Ethnikos Asteras, Athens Kallithea, Vyzas Megara, Panelefsiniakos, Chalkidona, Nikaia, Atromitos Piraeus, Thrasyvoulos, A.E. Kifisia, Aris Piraeus, Goudi Athens, Asteras Athens; Euboea: Chalkida, Olympiacos Chalkida; Boeotia: Levadiakos; Aetolia-Acarnania: Panetolikos; Phthiotis: Lamia |
| Macedonia | 19 | Central Macedonia: PAOK, Aris, Iraklis, Panserraikos, Apollon Kalamarias, Pierikos, Veria, Edessaikos, Makedonikos, Megas Alexandros Katerini, Naoussa, Thermaikos, Megas Alexandros Thessaloniki, Iraklis Serron; East Macedonia: Doxa Drama, Kavala, Philippoi Kavala, A.E. Kavala; West Macedonia: Kastoria |
| Peloponnese | 9 | Panachaiki, Asteras Tripolis, Kalamata, Paniliakos, Panegialios, Korinthos, Pankorinthiakos, Olympiakos Loutraki, Panargiakos |
| Cyprus | 5 | Olympiakos Nicosia, AEL Limassol, APOEL, EPA Larnaca, Omonia |
| Thessaly | 5 | AEL, Olympiacos Volos, Trikala, Niki Volos, Volos |
| Crete | 3 | OFI, Ergotelis, Platanias |
| Aegean Islands | 3 | Rodos, Diagoras, AEL Kalloni |
| Thrace | 4 | Aspida Xanthi, Orfeas Xanthi, Xanthi, Panthrakikos |
| Ionian Islands | 2 | Kerkyra, AOK Kerkyra |
| Epirus | 1 | PAS Giannina |

== Top scorers and appearances ==
Most appearances
| Rank | Name | Appearances | Teams |
|---|---|---|---|
| 1 | Mimis Domazos | 536 | Panathinaikos, AEK Athens |
| 2 | Nikos Nioplias | 509 | OFI, Panathinaikos, Chalkidona |
| 3 | Giorgos Koudas | 504 | PAOK |
| 4 | Thomas Mavros | 501 | Panionios, AEK Athens |
| 5 | Savvas Kofidis | 493 | Iraklis, Olympiacos, Aris |
| 6 | Mimis Papaioannou | 480 | AEK Athens |
| 6 | Stathis Chaitas | 480 | Panionios, AEL |
| 8 | Georgios Skartados | 478 | Rodos, PAOK, Iraklis, Olympiacos |
| 9 | Georgios Georgiadis | 476 | Doxa Drama, Panathinaikos, PAOK, Olympiacos, Iraklis |
| 10 | Dinos Kouis | 473 | Aris |
| 11 | Tasos Mitropoulos | 458 | Ethnikos Piraeus, Olympiacos, AEK Athens, Apollon Smyrnis, Iraklis, Veria |
| 12 | Elias Yfantis | 457 | Olympiacos |
| 13 | Takis Nikoloudis | 453 | Iraklis, AEK Athens, Olympiacos, Apollon Kalamarias |
| 14 | Angelos Kremmydas | 448 | Ethnikos Piraeus, Panachaiki |
| 15 | Stelios Manolas | 447 | AEK Athens |
| 16 | Dimitris Saravakos | 443 | Panionios, Panathinaikos, AEK Athens |
| 17 | Theodoros Pachatouridis | 434 | Doxa Drama, Olympiacos, Ionikos |
| 18 | Georgios Dedes | 429 | Panionios, AEK Athens |
| 19 | Ioannis Gounaris | 426 | PAOK, Olympiacos |
| 20 | Michalis Kritikopoulos | 422 | Panegialios, Ethnikos Piraeus, Olympiacos, Apollon Smyrnis |
Foreign players
| 1 | Krzysztof Warzycha | 390 | Panathinaikos |
| 2 | Predrag Đorđević | 375 | Paniliakos, Olympiacos |
| 3 | Toni Savevski | 357 | AEK Athens |
| 4 | Daniel Batista | 316 | Ethnikos Piraeus, Olympiacos, AEK Athens, Aris |
| 5 | Noni Lima | 291 | Panionios |

Most goals
| Rank | Name | Goals | Teams |
|---|---|---|---|
| 1 | Thomas Mavros | 260 | AEK Athens, Panionios |
| 2 | Krzysztof Warzycha | 244 | Panathinaikos |
| 3 | Mimis Papaioannou | 234 | AEK Athens |
| 4 | Giorgos Sideris | 224 | Olympiacos |
| 5 | Antonis Antoniadis | 187 | Panathinaikos, Olympiacos |
| 6 | Alexis Alexandris | 186 | Veria, AEK Athens, Olympiacos, AEL, Kallithea |
| 7 | Dimitris Saravakos | 186 | Panionios, Panathinaikos, AEK Athens |
| 8 | Georgios Dedes | 181 | Panionios, AEK Athens |
| 9 | Nikos Anastopoulos | 179 | Panionios, Olympiacos, Ionikos |
| 10 | Michalis Kritikopoulos | 175 | Panegialios, Ethnikos Piraeus, Olympiacos |
| 11 | Nikos Liberopoulos | 167 | Kalamata, Panathinaikos, AEK Athens |
| 12 | Demis Nikolaidis | 163 | Apollon Smyrnis, AEK Athens |
| 13 | Dinos Kouis | 142 | Aris |
| 14 | Kostas Nestoridis | 140 | AEK Athens |
| 15 | Mimis Domazos | 139 | Panathinaikos, AEK Athens |
| 16 | Georgios Georgiadis | 137 | Doxa Drama, Panathinaikos, PAOK, Olympiacos, Iraklis |
| 17 | Stavros Sarafis | 136 | PAOK |
| 17 | Dimitris Salpingidis | 136 | PAOK, Panathinaikos |
| 19 | Giorgos Koudas | 134 | PAOK |

== Greek football clubs in European competitions ==
A total of 20 Greek clubs have participated in European competitions. Olympiacos is the club with the most overall apps and matches. They are also the only Greek team to have won a European trophy and the first team in Europe to win both men and youth European titles in the same season, after winning the UEFA Conference League and the UEFA Youth League (unbeaten) in 2024.

All-time contribution of points for the UEFA country ranking.

As of 10 July 2024

| Rank | Club | Points |
|---|---|---|
| 25 | Olympiacos | 82.250 |
| 42 | Panathinaikos | 63.900 |
| 66 | PAOK | 45.583 |
| 70 | AEK Athens | 44.492 |
| 186 | Aris | 14.633 |
| 312 | Panionios | 6.533 |
| 359 | OFI | 5.267 |
| 388 | AEL | 4.683 |
| 472 | Iraklis | 3.167 |
| 499 | Asteras Tripolis | 2.900 |
| 664 | Atromitos | 1.500 |
| 706 | Panachaiki | 1.250 |
| 835 | Olympiacos Volos | 700 |
| 853 | Egaleo | 667 |
| 879 | Xanthi | 533 |
| 903 | Apollon Smyrnis | 500 |
| 1020 | Athinaikos | 250 |
| 1021 | Kastoria | 250 |
| 1053 | PAS Giannina | 200 |
| 1179 | Ionikos | 0 |

== UEFA ranking ==
=== Country rankings ===
As of 22 October 2026, the Greek Super League ranks 10th in the UEFA coefficient database, with 46.612 points.

| Rank | Competition | Points |
|---|---|---|
| 1 | (England) Premier League | 106.463 |
| 2 | (Italy) Serie A | 90.732 |
| 3 | (Spain) La Liga | 85.868 |
| 4 | (Germany) Bundesliga | 83.973 |
| 5 | (France) Ligue 1 | 71.010 |
| 6 | (Portugal) Primeira Liga | 67.350 |
| 7 | (Belgium) Belgian Pro League | 62.450 |
| 8 | (Netherlands) Eredivisie | 55.395 |
| 9 | (Turkey) Süper Lig | 52.275 |
| 10 | Super League Greece | 46.612 |
| 11 | (Czech Republic) Czech First League | 45.725 |
| 12 | (Poland) Ekstraklasa | 45.725 |
| 13 | (Norway) Eliteserien | 40.212 |
| 14 | (Denmark) Danish Superliga | 40.056 |
| 15 | (Cyprus) Cypriot First Division | 35.443 |
| 16 | (Switzerland) Swiss Super League | 31.200 |

=== Club rankings ===
As of 5 November 2026

| Rank | Club | Points |
|---|---|---|
| 28 | Olympiacos | 61.250 |
| 59 | PAOK | 37.750 |
| 63 | Panathinaikos | 35.250 |
| 70 | AEK Athens | 30.500 |
| 177 | Aris | 9.522 |
| 177 | OFI | 9.522 |

== Broadcasting rights ==
Nova Sports (premium channel) have taken the broadcasting rights for the home games of six teams of the Super League. The teams are Aris, Asteras AKTOR, Atromitos, Levadiakos, Panserraikos and PAOK. Cosmote Sport (also a premium channel) have taken the broadcasting rights for the home games of eight teams of the Super League. The teams are AEK Athens, A.E. Kifisia, AEL, OFI, Olympiacos, Panathinaikos, Panetolikos and Volos.

| Season | Broadcaster(s) | Notes |
|---|---|---|
| 2000–01 | Alpha TV, SuperSport, ERT | Nova held primary rights; Alpha aired highlights; ERT aired occasional matches |
| 2001–02 | Alpha TV, SuperSport, ERT | Similar to 2000–01; ERT showed select games (e.g. Panathinaikos, Olympiacos) |
| 2002–03 | Alpha Digital (collapsed), SuperSport, ERT | Alpha Digital collapsed mid-season; rights shifted to Nova and ERT temporarily stepped in |
| 2003–04 | SuperSport, ERT | Nova held primary rights; ERT aired selected games and highlights |
| 2004–05 | SuperSport, ERT | Nova with main coverage; ERT continued select Sunday match coverage |
| 2005–06 | SuperSport, ERT | Nova's dominance continued; ERT aired some derbies and highlights |
| 2006–07 | SuperSport, ERT | Centralized deal; no major ERT presence this season |
| 2007–08 | SuperSport, ERT | Exclusive deal with Nova |
| 2008–09 | SuperSport, ERT | Centralized broadcast rights |
| 2009–10 | Nova Sports | SuperSport rebranded as Nova Sports |
| 2010–11 | Nova Sports | Centralized league deal with Nova |
| 2011–12 | Nova Sports | Exclusive deal |
| 2012–13 | Nova Sports | - |
| 2013–14 | Nova Sports | - |
| 2014–15 | Nova Sports | - |
| 2015–16 | Nova Sports | - |
| 2016–17 | Nova Sports | Final year of centralized model |
| 2017–18 | Nova Sports | - |
| 2018–19 | Nova Sports, ERT | Club-by-club deals began; ERT aired Panathinaikos, Aris, Atromitos, Apollon Smyrnis, Lamia |
| 2019–20 | Nova Sports, ERT, PAOK TV | Same model; PAOK broadcast home matches via its own OTT platform PAOK TV |
| 2020–21 | Nova Sports, ERT | Final season with ERT broadcasting league matches |
| 2021–22 | Nova Sports, Cosmote Sport | Olympiacos, AEK, Panathinaikos, Aris signed with Cosmote; others on Nova |
| 2022–23 | Nova Sports, Cosmote Sport | Continued split of club TV rights; no more ERT involvement |
| 2023–24 | Nova Sports, Cosmote Sport | Ongoing club-by-club deals; similar to previous season |
| 2024–25 | Nova Sports, Cosmote Sport | Ongoing club-by-club deals; similar to previous season |

Eurosport has pan-European broadcasting rights for the Super League (except Greece and Portugal).

South Korean OTT Coupang Play has taken the broadcasting rights for Olympiacos' matches.

== Sponsorship ==
=== Title Sponsorship ===
From 2007 to 2017, the Super League had title sponsorship rights sold to one company, which were OPAP. From 2017 until 2019, the Super League has title sponsorship rights sold to the company Souroti. OPAP' deal with the Super League expired at the end of the 2016–17 season. The Super League announced on 20 July 2017 that the new title sponsorship deal for the Super League was with the Souroti company. On 28 January 2023 Stoiximan became the official sponsor of the league.

| Period | Sponsor | Name |
|---|---|---|
| 2007–2017 | OPAP | Super League OPAP |
| 2017–2019 | Souroti | Super League Souroti |
| 2019–2023 | Interwetten | Super League Interwetten |
| 2023– | Stoiximan | Stoiximan Super League |

=== Sponsor(s) ===
As well as sponsorship for the league itself, the Super League has a number of official partners and suppliers. The official ball supplier for the league is Puma. Also, Panini has held the licence to produce collectables for the Super League since 2008, including stickers (for their sticker album) and trading cards.

- AUTOVALUE
- Allianz
- Round Glass Living
- Mediterranean College

Super League Greece Official Sponsors:

== See also ==
- Greek football league system
- Greek Football Cup
- Greek Super Cup
- List of Greek football champions
- List of Greek football championship top scorers
- Greek football PSAP awards
- List of foreign Super League Greece players
- List of sports attendance figures
- Football records and statistics in Greece
