= List of Aris Thessaloniki F.C. seasons =

This article lists the performance of Aris in the Greek championship, the Greek Cup and the various European competitions they have qualified per season.

== Super League Greece ==
=== Before 1959 ===
Before 1959, Aris were competing in the Panhellenic Championship, the Greek National Football Championship format that was the predecessor of Alpha Ethniki. During this period, Aris managed to be crowned three times Greek Champion and numerous more regional Macedonian Champion

Regional Champion of Macedonian Football Clubs Association in 1923, 1924, 1926, 1928, 1929, 1930, 1931, 1934, 1938, 1946, 1949, 1953, 1959. ^{[M]}

Northern Greece Champion: 1933, 1935. ^{[M]}

Panhellenic Champion in 1928, 1932 and 1946.

| Season | Position in EPSM Championship | Position in Northern Greece Championship | Position in Panhellenic Championship |
| 1914–15 to 1918–19 ^{[1]} | - | - | - |
| 1919–20 to 1921–22 ^{[2]} | - | - | - |
| 1922–23 | 1st | - | runner-up (lost national play-off ^{[3]}) |
| 1923–24 | 1st | - | - |
| 1924–25 | not held | - | - |
| 1925–26 | 1st ^{[4]} | - | - |
| 1926–27 | 3rd | - | - |
| 1927–28 | 1st | - | 1st |
| 1928–29 | 1st | - | not held |
| 1929–30 | 1st | - | 2nd |
| 1930–31 | 1st | - | 3rd |
| 1931–32 | did not participate ^{[M]} | - | 1st |
| 1932–33 | not held ^{[M]} | 1st | 2nd |
| 1933–34 | 1st | 2nd | did not qualify ^{[M]} |
| 1934–35 | not held ^{[M]} | 1st | not held ^{[5]} |
| 1935–36 | not held ^{[M]} | not held ^{[M]} | 4th |
| 1936–37 | 3rd | not held ^{[M]} | did not qualify |
| 1937–38 | 1st | not held ^{[M]} | 3rd |
| 1938–39 | 2nd | 2nd | did not qualify |
| 1939–40 | 3rd | 2nd in Group A ^{[M]} | did not qualify |
| 1940–41 ^{[6]} | not finished | not held | not held |
| 1941–42 to 1944-45 ^{[7]} | not held | not held | not held |
| 1945–46 | 1st | not held ^{[M]} | 1st |
| 1946–47 | 4th | not held ^{[M]} | did not qualify |
| 1947–48 | 2nd | not held ^{[M]} | did not qualify |
| 1948–49 | 1st | not held ^{[M]} | 3rd ^{[8]} |
| 1949–50 | 3rd | not held ^{[M]} | not held |
| 1950–51 | 4th | not held ^{[M]} | did not qualify |
| 1951–52 | 2nd | not held ^{[M]} | not held |
| 1952–53 | 1st^{[9]} | not held ^{[M]} | 3rd |
| 1953–54 | 2nd | not held ^{[M]} | did not qualify |
| 1954–55 | 3rd | not held ^{[M]} | did not qualify |
| 1955–56 | 2nd | not held ^{[M]} | 6th after Final Stage ^{[10]} (1st in North Group of Semi-final round) |
| 1956–57 | 2nd | not held ^{[M]} | 7th ^{[11]} |
| 1957–58 | 4th ^{[12]} | not held ^{[M]} | did not qualify |
| 1958–59 | 1st | not held ^{[M]} | 6th ^{[13]} |

Notes:

1. During 1914-19 no championships could be held because of World War I.

2. During 1919-22 no championships could be held because of the Greco-Turkish War (1919–1922).

3. In 1922–23: runner-up after losing national play-off match against Piraikos Syndesmos, 3-1.

4. In 1925–26: 1st in EPSM Championship after winning play-off match against Iraklis, 4-1.

5. In 1934-35: The National Championship not held because the Greece national team was in preparation for the 5th Balkan Cup, and, also, because the political situation was unstable.

6. In 1940–41: The 1940–41 regional EPSM championship never finished, and the national one wasn't held because of World War II.

7. During 1941-45 the regional EPSM championship, along with the national one, was not held because of World War II.

8. In 1948–49: Panathinaikos-Aris awarded 2–0 due to crowd violence. Also, Aris had 1 point deducted.

9. In 1952–53: 1st in EPSM Championship after winning play-off matches against Iraklis (0-0 and 1-0).

10. In 1955-56: The National Championship was contested in two stages, a semifinal stage of 3 groups and a final stage of 6 teams, the winner and the runner-up of each group.

11. In 1956–57: Aris-Panargiakos awarded 2-0 because Panargiakos did not show up.

12. In 1957–58: 4th in EPSM Championship after drawing play-off match against PAOK 1-1. Aris lost the 3rd place due to worse goal average.

13. Aris qualifies for the 1959–60 Alpha Ethniki.

M. Macedonian Football Clubs Association Championship, which was formally organized in 1924, was the top tier competition for soccer teams in the Prefecture of Thessaloniki until 1959 with its winners (and sometimes lower placed teams) participating in the Panhellenic Championship, which was held from 1927–28 till 1958–59. However, in 1928–29, 1934–35, 1940–41 to 1944–45, 1949–50 and 1951–52 the Panhellenic Championship was not held, and in 1959–60 it was replaced with Alpha Ethniki. In 1924–25 the Macedonian Football Clubs Association Championship was not held, in 1931–32 the regional championship had 2nd level status and Aris participated in the combined regions' national championship, in 1932–33 the Northern Greece Championship was held instead of the Macedonian Football Clubs Association Championship, whereas in 1933–34 both championships were held and the Northern Greece Championship's winner, Iraklis, participated in the Panhellenic Championship play-off against the Southern Greece Championship's winner. In 1934–35 only the Northern Greece Championship was held instead of the Macedonian Football Clubs Association Championship, while in 1935–36 only a combined regions national championship was held. In 1936-37 and 1937-38 only the Macedonian Football Clubs Association Championship, and not the Northern Greece Championship, was held, while in 1938-39 and 1939-40 both championships were held and the Northern Greece Championship's winner participated in the Panhellenic Championship play-off against the Southern Greece Championship's winner. Also, in 1939-40 the Northern Greece Championship was played in two groups, with its winner being determined in play-off matches between the two group winners. The 1940–41 regional championship never finished, and the national one wasn't held, while, during 1941–45 the regional championship, along with the national one, was not held because of World War II. After 1939-1940, the Northern Greece Championship was not held again. Instead, a Northern inter-regional Championship was established in 1953-54 (for regions other than Thessaloniki, Athens and Piraeus), being the predecessor of Beta Ethniki, and securing National Championship places for regional teams since then.

- Point system: 1922–23 to 1958–59: 3–2–1.
- Teams competing in the national championship: 1922-23, 1933-34, 1937-38 and 1939-40: 2 (national play-offs). 1927-28, 1929-1930, 1932-33, 1936-37, 1937-38, 1945-46, 1947-48, 1948-49, 1950-51 and 1952-53: 3. 1946-47, 1953-54, 1954-55: 6. 1930-31, 1931-32 and 1935-36: 8. 1956-57, 1958-59: 10. 1957-58: 12. 1956-57: 14 in the Semifinal Stage and 6 in the Final Stage. Not held: 1923-27, 1928-29, 1934-35, 1940-41 to 1944-45, 1949–50 and 1951–52.

=== Since 1959 ===
From 1959 to 2014, Aris had been competing in the top-tier Alpha Ethniki of the Greek National Football Championship, with the interval of two seasons (1997–98 and 2005–06) that the club competed in the second-tier Beta Ethniki. During this period, the club had once been tied for the 1st place, in the 1979–80 season, ultimately losing the play-off match for 1st place to Olympiacos and had also reached the top 5 places many times. However, in 2014 it was relegated to third-tier Gamma Ethniki due to financial and management reasons. After spending two seasons in third-tier Gamma Ethniki and another two in second-tier Football League (Greece), Aris will compete in first-tier Super League Greece in season 2018–19.

| Season | Pos. | W–D–L | Goals | Points | Notes |
| 1959–60 | 8 | 10–9–11 | 31–35 | 59 | ^{[A]} |
| 1960–61 | 12 | 10–7–13 | 30–41 | 57 | ^{[B]} |
| 1961–62 | 13 | 7–8–15 | 30–43 | 52 | ^{[C]} |
| 1962–63 | 14 | 9–5–16 | 22–44 | 53 | ^{[D]} |
| 1963–64 | 6 | 10–11–9 | 28–29 | 61 | |
| 1964–65 | 7 | 8–12–10 | 38–38 | 58 | |
| 1965–66 | 5 | 11–8–11 | 42–42 | 60 | |
| 1966–67 | 5 | 14–5–11 | 38–30 | 63 | |
| 1967–68 | 4 | 16–9–9 | 61–49 | 75 | |
| 1968–69 | 3 | 17–11–6 | 54–33 | 79 | |
| 1969–70 | 4 | 20–7–7 | 47–15 | 81 | |
| 1970–71 | 10 | 10–13–11 | 45–39 | 67 | |
| 1971–72 | 4 | 18–11–5 | 52–25 | 81 | |
| 1972–73 | 9 | 13–9–12 | 38–36 | 69 | |
| 1973–74 | 3 | 21–6–7 | 49–29 | 48 | |
| 1974–75 | 6 | 15–9–10 | 47–38 | 39 | |
| 1975–76 | 6 | 13–9–8 | 50–27 | 35 | |
| 1976–77 | 5 | 17–8–9 | 58–34 | 42 | |
| 1977–78 | 6 | 12–12–10 | 39–35 | 36 | |
| 1978–79 | 3 | 22–6–6 | 63–26 | 50 | |
| 1979–80 | 2 | 19–9–6 | 46–20 | 47 | ^{[E]} |
| 1980–81 | 3 | 16–11–7 | 57–33 | 43 | |
| 1981–82 | 5 | 15–11–8 | 56–30 | 41 | |
| 1982–83 | 5 | 15–11–8 | 35–23 | 41 | |
| 1983–84 | 4 | 16–7–7 | 39–23 | 39 | |
| 1984–85 | 7 | 8–14–8 | 38–37 | 30 | |
| 1985–86 | 7 | 11–11–8 | 35–29 | 33 | |
| 1986–87 | 11 | 10–4–16 | 26–30 | 18 | ^{[F]} |
| 1987–88 | 9 | 11–5–14 | 39–41 | 27 | |
| 1988–89 | 7 | 11–11–8 | 31–26 | 33 | |
| 1989–90 | 7 | 11–13–10 | 37–40 | 35 | |
| 1990–91 | 9 | 11–11–12 | 34–38 | 33 | |
| 1991–92 | 7 | 12–7–15 | 26–40 | 31 | |
| 1992–93 | 9 | 12–6–16 | 40–50 | 42 | |
| 1993–94 | 4 | 18–9–7 | 55–34 | 63 | |
| 1994–95 | 7 | 19–5–10 | 46–34 | 62 | |
| 1995–96 | 7 | 12–10–12 | 45–47 | 46 | |
| 1996–97 | 16 | 9–11–14 | 32–48 | 35 | ^{[G]} |
| 1997–98 | Beta Ethniki | | | | ^{[H]} |
| 1998–99 | 6 | 19–3–12 | 53–43 | 60 | |
| 1999–2000 | 7 | 14–8–12 | 50–46 | 50 | |
| 2000–01 | 7 | 13–5–12 | 37–41 | 44 | |
| 2001–02 | 9 | 7–8–11 | 25–34 | 29 | |
| 2002–03 | 6 | 15–6–9 | 37–34 | 51 | |
| 2003–04 | 13 | 7–6–17 | 24–46 | 27 | |
| 2004–05 | 14 | 5–13–12 | 26–37 | 25 | ^{[I]} |
| 2005–06 | Beta Ethniki | | | | ^{[J]} |
| 2006–07 | 4 | 11–13–6 | 32–26 | 46 | |
| 2007–08 | 4 | 14–8–8 | 32–20 | 50 | ^{[K]} |
| 2008–09 | 6 | 13–8–9 | 30–31 | 47 | |
| 2009–10 | 4 | 12–10–8 | 35–28 | 46 | ^{[L]} |
| 2010–11 | 6 | 13–6–11 | 29–29 | 45 | |
| 2011–12 | 9 | 10–10–10 | 29–33 | 37 | ^{[N]} |
| 2012–13 | 13 | 7–12–11 | 32–40 | 33 | |
| 2013–14 | 18 | 3–13–18 | 26–53 | 22 | ^{[O]} |
| 2014–15 | Gamma Ethniki | | | | ^{[P]} |
| 2015–16 | Gamma Ethniki | | | | ^{[Q]} |
| 2016–17 | Football League | | | | ^{[R]} |
| 2017–18 | Football League | | | | ^{[S]} |
| 2018–19 | 5 | 15–4–11 | 46–33 | 49 | |
| 2019–20 | 5 | 10–12–14 | 48–51 | 42 | ^{[T]} |
| 2020–21 | 3 | 17–10–9 | 41–26 | 61 | ^{[U]} |
| 2021–22 | 3 | 18–8–10 | 39–28 | 62 | ^{[V]} |
| 2022–23 | 5 | 15–6–15 | 55–41 | 51 | ^{[W]} |
| 2023–24 | 5 | 16–7–13 | 51–44 | 55 | ^{[X]} |
| 2024–25 | 5 | 16–8–8 | 42–32 | 35 (regular season's 42 halved plus 14) | ^{[Y]} |
| 2025–26 | 5 | 11–13–8 | 34–32 | 31 (regular season's 30 halved plus 16) | |

Notes:

A. In 1959–60: 8th after play-off match with PAOK for places 7–8.

B. In 1960–61: 12th after play-off match with Proodeftiki F.C. for places 11–12.

C. In 1961–62: 13th after play-off matches with Niki Volos F.C. and Apollon Kalamarias F.C. for places 11–13.

D. In 1962–63: 14th after play-off matches with Apollon Kalamarias F.C., Proodeftiki F.C. and Panegialios F.C. for places 12–15.

E. In 1979–80: 2nd after play-off match with Olympiacos F.C. for the championship.

F. In 1986–87: Most of the teams went the last three match days on strike. Only Olympiacos, Panathinaikos, OFI and Panionios did not. All other teams had −6 points, because they did not show-up.

G. In 1996–97: Athinaikos-Aris awarded 2–0, because Aris could not present the registration ID's and health certificates of the players to the referee. Moreover, Aris had 3 points deducted, finished 16th and was relegated to Beta Ethniki.

H. In 1997–98: Aris participated in Beta Ethniki, finishing 1st (with 20 matches won, 12 drawn and 2 lost, 52 goals for and 18 against and 72 points) and being promoted to top-tier Alpha Ethniki.

I. In 2004–05: Aris-Iraklis awarded 0–2; abandoned at 1–2 in 43', because Aris fans entered the pitch and attacked some of the players of Iraklis. Moreover, Aris had 3 points deducted, finished 14th and was relegated to Beta Ethniki.

J. In 2005–06: Aris participated in Beta Ethniki, finishing 3rd (with 14 matches won, 12 drawn and 4 lost, 33 goals for and 17 against and 54 points) and being promoted to top-tier Super League.

K. In 2007–08: finished in 4th place in the regular season, qualifying for the play-offs, and, finishing overall in 4th place after the league play–offs (clubs placed 2nd to 5th).

L. In 2009–10: finished in 5th place in the regular season, qualifying for the play-offs, and, finishing overall in 4th place after the league play–offs (clubs placed 2nd to 5th).

N. In 2011–12: Aris-Asteras Tripolis awarded 0–3; abandoned at 0–1 in 42', because an Aris fan threw a plastic water bottle into the field, which hit the lineswoman of that side. The lineswoman declared herself unable to continue due to psychological reasons, the match was abandoned and later awarded to Asteras Tripoli, while Aris also had 3 points deducted.

O. In 2013–14: finished last (18th), but was relegated to third-tier Gamma Ethniki, an amateur league, instead of second-tier Football League, a professional league, due to financial and management reasons.

P. In 2014–15: Aris participated in Group 1 of third-tier Gamma Ethniki, an amateur league, finishing 2nd with 22 matches won, 5 drawn and 3 lost, 51 goals for and 12 against and 71 points.

Q. In 2015–16: Aris participated in Group 1 of third-tier Gamma Ethniki, an amateur league, finishing 1st with 28 matches won, 3 drawn and 1 lost, 76 goals for and 17 against and 87 points and being promoted to second-tier Football League.

R. In 2016–17: Aris participated in second-tier Football League, finishing 3rd with 23 matches won, 8 drawn and 3 lost, 58 goals for and 17 against and 77 points.

S. In 2017–18: Aris participated in second-tier Football League, finishing 2nd with 26 matches won, 7 drawn and 1 lost, 65 goals for and 13 against and 85 points and being promoted to first-tier Super League.

T. In 2019–20: finished in 6th place in the regular season, qualifying for the play-offs, and, finishing overall in 5th place after the league play–offs (clubs placed 1st to 6th).

U. In 2020–21: finished in 2nd place in the regular season, qualifying for the play-offs, and, finishing overall in 3rd place after the league play–offs (clubs placed 1st to 6th).

V. In 2021–22: finished in 4th place in the regular season, qualifying for the play-offs, and, finishing overall in 3rd place after the league play–offs (clubs placed 1st to 6th).

W. In 2022–23: finished in 5th place in the regular season, qualifying for the play-offs, and, finishing overall in 5th place after the league play–offs (clubs placed 1st to 6th).

X. In 2023–24: finished in 5th place in the regular season, qualifying for the play-offs, and, finishing overall in 5th place after the league play–offs (clubs placed 1st to 6th).

Y. In 2024–25: finished in 5th place in the regular season, qualifying for the Europe play-offs, and, finishing overall in 5th place after these play–offs (clubs placed 5th to 8th).

- Point system: 1959–60 to 1972–73: 3–2–1. 1973–74 to 1991–92: 2–1–0. 1992–93 onwards: 3–1–0.
- Teams competing in the first-tier championship: 1959–60 to 1966–67: 16. 1967–68 to 1974–75: 18. 1975–76: 16. 1976–77 to 1982–83: 18. 1983–84 to 1988–89: 16. 1989–90 to 1999–00: 18. 2000–01: 16. 2001–02: 14. 2002–03 to 2012–13: 16. 2013–14 to 2014–15: 18. 2015–16 to 2018–19: 16. 2019–20 to present: 14.
- Teams participating in the second-tier championship in 1997–98: 18. Teams participating in the second-tier championship in 2005–06: 16. Teams participating in the second-tier championship in 2016–17: 18. Teams participating in the second-tier championship in 2017–18: 18.
- Teams participating in the third-tier championship in 2014–15: Total: 61, Group 1: 16. Teams participating in the third-tier championship in 2015–16: Total: 64, Group 1: 17.

==== League top scorers ====
| Player | Goals |
|---|---|
| (Greece) Dinos Kouis | 141 |
| (Greece) Alexandros Alexiades | 127 |
| (Greece) Kostas Papaioannou | 65 |
| (Greece) Kostas Drampis | 48 |
| (Greece) (Romania) Giorgos Zindros | 46 |

==== Most league appearances ====
| Player | Matches |
|---|---|
| (Greece) Dinos Kouis | 473 |
| (Greece) Theodoros Pallas | 368 |
| (Greece) Giannis Nalbantis | 303 |
| (Greece) Giorgos Foiros | 303 |
| (Greece) Giannis Venos | 303 |

== Greek Football Cup ==
Aris has been participating in the Greek Football Cup since its inception in the 1931–1932 season, having been 9 times in the cup final, winning it once in the 1969–70 season.

| Season | Eliminated in Round | Goals | Number of Rounds; Aris played in | Notes |
| 1931–32 | Final | 13-9 | 4 | ^{[Α]} ^{[Β]} |
| 1932–33 | Final | 13-7 | 4 | ^{[Γ]} |
| 1933–34 to 1937-38 | not held | - | - | ^{[Δ]} |
| 1938–39 | Quarter-finals | 8-3 | 2 | |
| 1939–40 | Final | 13-9 | 4 | ^{[Ε]} ^{[ΣΤ]} |
| 1940–41 | not finished | - | - | ^{[Ζ]} |
| 1941–42 to 1945-46 | not held | - | - | ^{[Η]} |
| 1946–47 | Quarter-finals | 1-2 | 2 | |
| 1947–48 | 3rd Round | 7-4 | 3 | |
| 1948–49 | 1st Round | 0-2 | 1 | ^{[Θ]} |
| 1949–50 | Final | 11-10 | 4 | ^{[Ι]} ^{[ΙΑ]} |
| 1950–51 | Quarter-finals | 7-4 | 2 | |
| 1951–52 | Quarter-finals | 8-5 | 5 | |
| 1952–53 | Quarter-finals | 5-2 | 2 | |
| 1953–54 | Quarter-finals | 3-3 | 2 | |
| 1954–55 | Quarter-finals | 10-4 | 3 | |
| 1955–56 | Semi-finals | 6-5 | 4 | ^{[ΙΒ]} |
| 1956–57 | Round of 16 | 4-3 | 2 | |
| 1957–58 | Quarter-finals | 6-2 | 3 | ^{[ΙΓ]} |
| 1958–59 | Round of 16 | 18-4 | 6 | |
| 1959–60 | Quarter-finals | 5-3 | 3 | |
| 1960–61 | Round of 16 | 4-3 | 2 | |
| 1961–62 | Quarter-finals | 5-5 | 3 | ^{[ΙΔ]} |
| 1962–63 | Semi-finals | 11-6 | 4 | ^{[ΙΕ]} |
| 1963–64 | Round of 16 | 1-2 | 2 | |
| 1964–65 | Quarter-finals | 5-4 | 3 | |
| 1965–66 | Round of 32 | 0-1 | 1 | |
| 1966–67 | Round of 32 | 17-4 | 6 | |
| 1967–68 | Round of 16 | 18-3 | 6 | ^{[ΙΣΤ]} |
| 1968–69 | Round of 16 | 3-3 | 2 | |
| 1969–70 | - (Cup Winner) | 8-2 | 5 | ^{[ΙΖ]} |
| 1970–71 | Round of 32 | 1-2 | 1 | |
| 1971–72 | Quarter-finals | 9-3 | 4 | ^{[ΙΗ]} |
| 1972–73 | Round of 32 | 2-1 | 2 | |
| 1973–74 | Round of 16 | 7-2 | 3 | |
| 1974–75 | Round of 16 | 3-3 | 2 | |
| 1975–76 | Quarter-finals | 9-4 | 4 | |
| 1976–77 | Round of 16 | 6-2 | 3 | |
| 1977–78 | Semi-finals | 11-6 | 5 | |
| 1978–79 | Quarter-finals | 20-18 | 4 | |
| 1979–80 | Quarter-finals | 4-3 | 4 | ^{[ΙΘ]} |
| 1980–81 | Quarter-finals | 12-4 | 4 | |
| 1981–82 | 1st Round | 1-3 | 1 | |
| 1982–83 | Round of 32 | 6-2 | 2 | |
| 1983–84 | Round of 16 | 10-7 | 3 | |
| 1984–85 | Round of 32 | 14-3 | 2 plus an additional Round | |
| 1985–86 | Semi-finals | 16-8 | 5 | |
| 1986–87 | Round of 16 | 13-6 | 3 plus an additional Round | |
| 1987–88 | Round of 16 | 10-4 | 3 | |
| 1988–89 | Round of 16 | 10-4 | 3 | |
| 1989–90 | Round of 16 | 16-7 | 3 | |
| 1990–91 | Round of 32 | 13-7 | 2 | |
| 1991–92 | Round of 32 | 13-3 | 2 | |
| 1992–93 | 1st Round | 5-3 | 1 | |
| 1993–94 | Semi-finals | 18-10 | 5 | |
| 1994–95 | Round of 16 | 9-11 | 3 | |
| 1995–96 | Quarter-finals | 19-7 | 4 | |
| 1996–97 | Round of 16 | 4-5 | 2 | |
| 1997–98 | Quarter-finals | 18-10 | 5 | |
| 1998–99 | Round of 32 | 3-3 | 2 | |
| 1999–00 | Quarter-finals | 12-5 | 3 | ^{[Κ]} |
| 2000–01 | Round of 16 | 17-12 | 2 | |
| 2001–02 | Quarter-finals | 17-5 | 4 | ^{[ΚΑ]} |
| 2002–03 | Final | 18-5 | 6 | ^{[ΚΒ]} |
| 2003–04 | Round of 16 | 7-6 | 3 | |
| 2004–05 | Final | 21-11 | 6 | ^{[ΚΓ]} |
| 2005–06 | 3rd Round | 1-2 | 1 | |
| 2006–07 | Round of 32 | 0-2 | 1 | |
| 2007–08 | Final | 8-3 | 5 | ^{[ΚΔ]} |
| 2008–09 | Round of 16 | 2-1 | 2 | ^{[ΚΕ]} |
| 2009–10 | Final | 14-7 | 5 | ^{[ΚΣΤ]} |
| 2010–11 | Round of 32 | 1-1 | 1 | ^{[ΚΖ]} |
| 2011–12 | Round of 16 | 3-3 | 2 | |
| 2012–13 | Round of 32 | 3-4 | 1 | |
| 2013–14 | Round of 32 | 0-1 | 1 | |
| 2014–15 | First Round (Had to withdraw and participate in the 2014–15 Gamma Ethniki Cup) | - | 0 | ^{[ΚΗ]} |
| 2015–16 | EPSM Cup, as part of the 1st round of Greek Football Amateur Cup | | | ^{[ΚΘ]} |
| 2016–17 | Round of 16 | 7-6 | 2 | |
| 2017–18 | First Round | 3-3 | 1 | |
| 2018–19 | Round of 32 (group stage) | 5-5 | 1 | |
| 2019–20 | Semi-finals | 7-5 | 3 | |
| 2020–21 | Quarter-finals | 6-3 | 2 | |
| 2021–22 | Quarter-finals | 5-2 | 2 | |
| 2022–23 | Quarter-finals | 3-3 | 2 | |
| 2023–24 | Final | 7-4 | 4 | ^{[ΚΙ]} |
| 2024–25 | Round of 16 | 2-2 | 2 | |
| 2025–26 | | | | |

Notes:

Α. In 1931–32: Aris would enter in the round of 16, but got a bye and entered in the quarter-finals.

Β. In 1931–32: finalist, lost final against AEK Athens 5-3.

Γ. In 1932–33: finalist, drew final against Ethnikos Piraeus F.C. 2-2 and lost replay final 2-1.

Δ. During 1933-38 no cup tournaments were held due to financial reasons.

Ε. In 1939-40: won Round of 16 against Doxa Drama F.C. in replay match 4-2 as the original match ended in a 1-1 draw, won Quarter-finals against PAOK in replay match 1-0 as the original match ended in a 1-1 draw, won Semi-finals against AEK in second replay match 3-0 as the original match ended in a 2-2 draw and the first replay match in a 0-0 draw.

ΣΤ. In 1939-40: finalist, lost final against Panathinaikos F.C. 3-1.

Ζ. In 1940-41: only some 1st Round matches were played before the tournament was abandoned because of World War II; Aris did not participate in those.

Η. During 1941-46 no cup tournaments were held because of World War II.

Θ. In 1948-49: lost 1st Round against Iraklis in replay match 2-0 as the original match was suspended in the 88th minute and ultimately abandoned due to dim light, while Aris was winning 0-1.

Ι. In 1949-50: won Quarter-finals against PAOK in replay match 1-3 as the original match ended in a 3-3 draw.

IΑ. In 1949-50: finalist, lost final against AEK Athens 4-0.

ΙΒ. In 1955-56: won Quarter-finals against Iraklis in replay match 2-1 as the original match ended in a 1-1 draw.

ΙΓ. In 1957-58: lost Quarter-finals against Panathinaikos F.C. 2-0 because Aris did not show up in protest to its treatment by the Greek Federation and the match was awarded to Panathinaikos.

ΙΔ. In 1961-62: won Round of 16 against PAOK on coin toss as both the original match and the replay match ended in 1-1 draws.

ΙΕ. In 1962-63: won Round of 16 against Iraklis in replay match 0-3 as the original match ended in a 0-0 draw, lost Semi-finals against Olympiacos in replay match 5-2 as the original match ended in a 1-1 draw.

ΙΣΤ. In 1967–68: won Round of 32 against Kavala F.C. on coin toss as the two teams were drawn 0-0 after extra time in the original match.

ΙΖ. In 1969-70: cup winner, won final against PAOK 1-0.

ΙΗ. In 1971-72: lost Quarter-finals against PAOK 0-2 because Aris' players attacked the referee in the 89th minute while the score was 1-2 in favour of PAOK; the match was suspended and awarded to PAOK.

ΙΘ. In 1979-80: entered in the 1st Round, but advanced from the 2nd round (round of 32) to the 3rd round (round of 16) on a bye.

Κ. In 1999-00: won Round of 16 against Panathinaikos F.C. on penalties 4-2 as the two teams were drawn 1-1 after extra time in the original match.

ΚΑ. In 2001-02: entered in the 1st Round, but advanced from the 2nd round (round of 32) to the 3rd round (round of 16) on a bye.

ΚΒ. In 2002-03: finalist, lost final against PAOK 1-0.

ΚΓ. In 2004-05: finalist, lost final against Olympiacos 3-0.

ΚΔ. In 2007-08: finalist, lost final against Olympiacos 2-0.

ΚΕ. In 2008-09: lost Round of 16 against PAOK on penalties 8-9 as both the original match and the replay match ended in 0-0 draws.

ΚΣΤ. In 2009-10: finalist, lost final against Panathinaikos F.C. 1-0.

ΚΖ. In 2010-11: lost Round of 32 against Trikala F.C. on penalties 4-2 as the two teams were drawn 1-1 after extra time in the original match.

ΚΗ. In 2014-15: had to withdraw from the Greek Football Cup, as it participated in third-tier Gamma Ethniki, an amateur league, and therefore could only compete in the associated Gamma Ethniki Cup. Aris reached the Quarter-finals of the 2014–15 Gamma Ethniki Cup, having scored 8 and conceded 4 goals, after having played in 4 rounds of the cup competition.

ΚΘ. In 2015-16: participated in third-tier Gamma Ethniki, an amateur league, and therefore could only compete in the Greek Football Amateur Cup. Aris participated in the EPSM Cup, which formed the 1st round of the Greek Football Amateur Cup, and played only a single round, losing 2-1 to Niki Mesimeriou.

ΚΙ. In 2023-24: finalist, lost final against Panathinaikos F.C. 1-0.

== European competitions ==
Aris FC have played in the UEFA Cup and the UEFA Cup Winners' Cup on many occasions. The furthest the club has progressed is to the third round of the 1979–80 UEFA Cup where Aris beat the Portuguese side Benfica 4–3 on aggregate in the 1st Round, and Italian club Perugia 4–1 on aggregate in the 2nd Round, before being eliminated 4–7 on aggregate by French club Saint Etienne. Aris's most recent participation in Europe is in the 2010–11 UEFA Europa League. The club's biggest win in a European competition was 6–0 to Hibernians, while the heaviest defeat was 1–9 to Újpest, both in 1968–69.

Aris boasts a remarkable statistic in European football; the club had not lost a home game in European competitions in 52 years (1968 το 2020), having gone 28 home games undefeated. This record was notably maintained when Aris defeated Europa League champions Atlético Madrid on 16 September 2010, Aris' 23rd undefeated home game in Europe. The team then went on to tie Bayer Leverkusen and Manchester City to keep the record intact once more. In 2020, Aris finally recorded a home loss to FC Kolos Kovalivka in a European qualification game.

=== European matches panorama ===
Aris Thessaloniki F.C. scores are given first in all scorelines.

| Season | Competition | Round | Opponent | | Home leg | Away leg | Aggregate | Notes |
| Season | Competition | Round | Country | Club | Home leg | Away leg | Aggregate | Notes |
|---|---|---|---|---|---|---|---|---|
| 1964–65 | Inter-Cities Fairs Cup | 1st Round | Italy | A.S. Roma | 0–0 | 0–3 | 0–3 | |
| 1965–66 | Inter-Cities Fairs Cup | 2nd Round | West Germany | FC Köln | 2–1 | 0–2 | 2–3 | |
| 1966–67 | Inter-Cities Fairs Cup | 1st Round | Italy | Juventus | 0–2 | 0–5 | 0–7 | |
| 1968–69 | Inter-Cities Fairs Cup | 1st Round | Malta | Hibernians | 1–0 | 6–0 | 7–0 | |
| 1968–69 | Inter-Cities Fairs Cup | 2nd Round | Hungary | Újpest | 1–2 | 1–9 | 2–11 | |
| 1969–70 | Inter-Cities Fairs Cup | 1st Round | Italy | Cagliari | 1–1 | 0–3 | 1–4 | |
| 1970–71 | Cup Winners' Cup | 1st Round | England | Chelsea | 1–1 | 1–5 | 2–6 | |
| 1974–75 | UEFA Cup | 1st Round | Austria | Rapid Wien | 1–0 | 1–3 | 2–3 | |
| 1979–80 | UEFA Cup | 1st Round | Portugal | Benfica | 3–1 | 1–2 | 4–3 | |
| 1979–80 | UEFA Cup | 2nd Round | Italy | Perugia | 1–1 | 3–0 | 4–1 | |
| 1979–80 | UEFA Cup | 3rd Round | France | Saint-Étienne | 3–3 | 1–4 | 4–7 | |
| 1980–81 | UEFA Cup | 1st Round | England | Ipswich Town | 3–1 | 1–5 | 4–6 | |
| 1981–82 | UEFA Cup | 1st Round | Malta | Sliema Wanderers | 4–0 | 4–2 | 8–2 | |
| 1981–82 | UEFA Cup | 2nd Round | Belgium | Lokeren | 1–1 | 0–4 | 1–5 | |
| 1994–95 | UEFA Cup | Qualifying Round | Israel | Hapoel Be'er Sheva | 3–1 | 2–1 | 5–2 | |
| 1994–95 | UEFA Cup | 1st Round | Poland | Katowice | 1–0 | 0–1 | 1–1 | 3–4 on penalties |
| 1999–00 | UEFA Cup | 1st Round | Switzerland | Servette | 1–1 | 2–1 (a.e.t) | 3–2 (a.e.t) | extra time win |
| 1999–00 | UEFA Cup | 2nd Round | Spain | Celta de Vigo | 2–2 | 0–2 | 2–4 | |
| 2003–04 | UEFA Cup | 1st Round | Moldova | Zimbru Chişinău | 2–1 | 1–1 | 3–2 | |
| 2003–04 | UEFA Cup | 2nd Round | Italy | Perugia | 1–1 | 0–2 | 1–3 | |
| 2005–06 | UEFA Cup | 1st Round | Italy | A.S. Roma | 0–0 | 1–5 | 1–5 | |
| 2007–08 | UEFA Cup | 1st Round | Spain | Real Zaragoza | 1–0 | 1–2 | 2–2(a) | Aris advanced to the next round on away goals |
| 2007–08 | UEFA Cup | Group stage (Group F) | Serbia | Red Star Belgrade | 3–0 | | 3–0 | group phase was played in a single round-robin format |
| 2007–08 | UEFA Cup | Group stage (Group F) | England | Bolton Wanderers | | 1–1 | 1–1 | group phase was played in a single round-robin format |
| 2007–08 | UEFA Cup | Group stage (Group F) | Portugal | Braga | 1–1 | | 1–1 | group phase was played in a single round-robin format |
| 2007–08 | UEFA Cup | Group stage (Group F) | Germany | Bayern Munich | | 0–6 | 0–6 | group phase was played in a single round-robin format |
| 2008–09 | UEFA Cup | 2nd Qualifying; Round | Croatia | Slaven Belupo | 1–0 | 0–2 | 1–2 | |
| 2010–11 | UEFA Europa League | 3rd Qualifying; Round | Poland | Jagiellonia Białystok | 2–2 | 2–1 | 4–3 | |
| 2010–11 | UEFA Europa League | Play-off Round | Austria | Austria Wien | 1–0 | 1–1 | 2–1 | |
| 2010–11 | UEFA Europa League | Group stage (Group B) | Spain | Atlético Madrid | 1–0 | 3–2 | 4–2 | Aris advanced to the next round, finishing 2nd with 10 points |
| 2010–11 | UEFA Europa League | Group stage (Group B) | Germany | Bayer Leverkusen | 0–0 | 0–1 | 0–1 | Aris advanced to the next round, finishing 2nd with 10 points |
| 2010–11 | UEFA Europa League | Group stage (Group B) | Norway | Rosenborg | 2–0 | 1–2 | 3–2 | Aris advanced to the next round, finishing 2nd with 10 points |
| 2010–11 | UEFA Europa League | Round of 32 | England | Manchester City | 0–0 | 0-3 | 0-3 | |
| 2019–20 | UEFA Europa League | 2nd Qualifying; Round | Cyprus | AEL | 0–0 | 1–0 | 1–0 | |
| 2019–20 | UEFA Europa League | 3rd Qualifying; Round | Norway | Molde FK | 3–1 (a.e.t) | 0–3 | 3–4 (a.e.t) | extra time loss |
| 2020–21 | UEFA Europa League | 2nd Qualifying; Round | Ukraine | FC Kolos Kovalivka | 1–2 | – | 1-2 | single match due to the COVID-19 pandemic |
| 2021–22 | UEFA Europa Conference League | 2nd Qualifying; Round | Kazakhstan | FC Astana | 2–1 (a.e.t) | 0–2 | 2–3 (a.e.t) | extra time loss |
| 2022–23 | UEFA Europa Conference League | 2nd Qualifying; Round | Belarus | FC Gomel | 5–1 | 2–1 | 7–2 | The away game was also played in Greece, as, due to the country's involvement in the Russian invasion of Ukraine, Belarusian teams are required to play their home matches at neutral venues and behind closed doors until further notice. |
| 2022–23 | UEFA Europa Conference League | 3rd Qualifying; Round | Israel | Maccabi Tel Aviv F.C. | 2–1 | 0–2 | 2–3 | |
| 2023–24 | Europa Conference League | 2nd Qualifying Round | Armenia | Ararat-Armenia | 1–0 | 1–1 | 2–1 | |
| 2023–24 | Europa Conference League | 3rd Qualifying Round | Ukraine | Dynamo Kyiv | 1–0 | 1–2 | 2–2 | 5-6 on penalties |
| 2025–26 | Europa Conference League | 2nd Qualifying Round | Azerbaijan | Araz-Naxçıvan | 1–2 | 2–2 | 3–4 | |

=== UEFA club ranking ===
==== Current season ranking ====
| Rank | Country | Team | Points |
|---|---|---|---|
| 30 | (Greece) | Aris | 1.500 |

As of 2025.

==== Ranking for the past decade ====
| Rank | Country | Team | Points |
|---|---|---|---|
| 219 | (Greece) | Aris | 13.122 |

As of 2025.

=== UEFA club competition record ===
After 2022 2nd qualifying round matches.

| Competition | Pld | W | D | L | GF | GA |
|---|---|---|---|---|---|---|
| UEFA Champions League | 0 | 0 | 0 | 0 | 0 | 0 |
| UEFA Cup Winners' Cup | 2 | 0 | 1 | 1 | 2 | 6 |
| UEFA Cup & UEFA Europa League | 53 | 21 | 15 | 17 | 69 | 75 |
| UEFA Europa Conference League | 12 | 6 | 2 | 4 | 18 | 15 |
| UEFA Super Cup | 0 | 0 | 0 | 0 | 0 | 0 |
| Inter-Cities Fairs Cup (not sanctioned by UEFA) | 12 | 3 | 2 | 7 | 12 | 28 |
| Intercontinental Cup | 0 | 0 | 0 | 0 | 0 | 0 |
| Total | 79 | 30 | 20 | 29 | 101 | 124 |

== Honours ==
Aris Thessaloniki's honours and achievements include the following:

=== Domestic ===
==== Domestic Championships ====
- Panhellenic Championship / Alpha Ethniki / Super League (tier 1)
  - Champions (3): 1927–28, 1931–32, 1945–46
  - Runners-up (3): 1929–30, 1932–33, 1979–80
- Beta Ethniki / Football League (tier 2)
  - Champions (1): 1997–98
  - Runners-up (1): 2017–18
  - Promotion (2): 1997–98 ^{[A]}, 2005–06 ^{[B]}, 2017–18 ^{[C]}
- Gamma Ethniki / Football League 2 (tier 3)
  - Champions (1): 2015–16
  - Runners-up (1): 2014–15
  - Promotion (1): 2015–16 ^{[D]}

==== Domestic Cups ====
- Greek Cup
  - Winners (1): 1969–70
  - Finalists (8): 1931–32, 1932–33, 1939–40, 1949–50, 2002–03, 2004–05, 2007–08, 2009–10
- Greek Amateurs' Cup
  - Winners (1): 1984-85

=== International ===
- Greater Greece Cup
  - Winners (1): 1971

=== Regional ===
- Macedonian Football Clubs Association Championship (local level 1 until 1959) ^{[E]}
  - Winners (13): 1922–23, 1923–24, 1925–26, 1927–28, 1928–29, 1929–30, 1930–31, 1933–34, 1937–38, 1945–46, 1948–49, 1952–53, 1958–59
  - Runners up (6): 1938–39, 1947–48, 1951–52, 1953–54, 1955–56, 1956–57
- Northern Greece Championship (regional level 1 in 1932–35, 1938–40) ^{[D]}
  - Winners (2): 1932–33, 1934–35
  - Runners up (2): 1933–34, 1938–39

=== Youth ===
- Greek Youth Football Championship (national level 1)
  - Winners(11): 1962, 1963, 1964, 1971, 1975, 1978, 1983, 1984, 1985, 1987, 1991
- Super League U–20 Championship (national level 1)
  - Winners (2): 2001–02, 2010–11
- Super League U-17 Championship (national level 1)
  - Winners (1): 2011-12
  - Finalists (1): 2021-22
- Football League U-19 Championship (national level 2)
  - Winners (1): 2017-18
  - Finalists (1): 2016-17

Notes:

A. In 1997–98: Aris participated in Beta Ethniki, finishing 1st (with 20 matches won, 12 drawn and 2 lost, 52 goals for and 18 against and 72 points) and being promoted to top-tier Alpha Ethniki.

B. In 2005–06: Aris participated in Beta Ethniki, finishing 3rd (with 14 matches won, 12 drawn and 4 lost, 33 goals for and 17 against and 54 points) and being promoted to top-tier Super League.

C. In 2017–18: Aris participated in second-tier Football League, finishing 2nd (with 26 matches won, 7 drawn and 1 lost, 65 goals for and 13 against and 85 points) and being promoted to top-tier Super League.

D. In 2015–16: Aris participated in Group 1 of Gamma Ethniki, an amateur league, finishing 1st (with 28 matches won, 3 drawn and 1 lost, 76 goals for and 17 against and 87 points) and being promoted to second-tier Football League.

E. Macedonian Football Clubs Association Championship, which was formally organized in 1924, was the top tier competition for soccer teams in the Prefecture of Thessaloniki until 1959 with its winners (and sometimes lower placed teams) participating in the Panhellenic Championship, which was held from 1927–28 till 1958–59. However, in 1928–29, 1934–35, 1940–41 to 1944–45, 1949–50 and 1951–52 the Panhellenic Championship was not held, and in 1959–60 it was replaced with Alpha Ethniki. In 1924–25 the Macedonian Football Clubs Association Championship was not held, in 1931–32 the regional championship had 2nd level status and Aris participated in the combined regions' national championship, in 1932–33 the Northern Greece Championship was held instead of the Macedonian Football Clubs Association Championship, whereas in 1933–34 both championships were held and the Northern Greece Championship's winner. Iraklis, participated in the Panhellenic Championship play-off against the Southern Greece Championship's winner. In 1934–35 only the Northern Greece Championship was held instead of the Macedonian Football Clubs Association Championship, while in 1935–36 only a combined regions national championship was held. In 1936-37 and 1937-38 only the Macedonian Football Clubs Association Championship, and not the Northern Greece Championship, was held, while in 1938-39 and 1939-40 both championships were held and the Northern Greece Championship's winner participated in the Panhellenic Championship play-off against the Southern Greece Championship's winner. Also, in 1939-40 the Northern Greece Championship was played in two groups, with its winner being determined in play-off matches between the two group winners. The 1940–41 regional championship never finished, and the national one wasn't held, while, during 1941–45 the regional championship, along with the national one, was not held because of World War II. After 1939-1940, the Northern Greece Championship was not held again. Instead, a Northern inter-regional Championship was established in 1953-54 (for regions other than Thessaloniki, Athens and Piraeus), being the predecessor of Beta Ethniki, and securing National Championship places for regional teams since then.
