= 1925–26 Atromitos F.C. season =

Atromitos
1925–26 season
- Chairman: Andreas Tsouroutsoylou
- AFCA League: 4th
Home colours	Away colours

The 1925–26 season of Atromitos was the 3rd in the club's history and the second season that the club were participating in the Athens Football Clubs Association League.

The chairman of the team was Andreas Tsouroutsoylou, the person that created the club.

== Athens Football Clubs Association League ==
Competition: The league was conducted in one group, from which the first team would be declared champions.

Atromitos finished at the fourth place among seven teams.

=== League table ===
Pos	Team	GF	GA	GD	Pts
1	Panathinaikos (C)	46	5	+41	34
2	Apollon Athens	25	16	+9	30
3	AEK Athens	31	16	+15	28
4	Atromitos	30	21	+9	22
5	Athinaikos	26	34	-8	22
6	Armeniki Enosis	6	33	-27	17
7	Attikos	4	46	-42	15

GF = Goals for; GA = Goals against; GD = Goal difference; Pts = Points

=== Group Stage Matches ===
27 December 1925 1	AEK Athens	4–2	Atromitos	Goudi
				Stadium: Goudi Stadium

2	Apollon Athens	2–1	Atromitos	Athens

3	Atromitos	11–0	Attikos	Athens

4	Panathinaikos	6–0	Atromitos	Athens

5	Atromitos	5–1	Athinaikos	Athens

6	Armeniki Enosis	1–0	Atromitos	Athens

28 January 1926 7	Atromitos	0–1	AEK Athens	Ampelokipoi
14:00				Stadium: Leoforos Alexandras Stadium

8	Atromitos	3–0	Apollon Athens	Athens

9	Attikos	0–3	Atromitos	Athens

10	Atromitos	1–2	Panathinaikos	Athens

11	Athinaikos	3–2	Atromitos	Athens

12	Atromitos	2–0	Armeniki Enosis	Athens
