= 1921–22 FCA Championship =

1st season of FCA Championship

Football Clubs Association Championship
- Season: 1921–22
- Champions: Panellinios Podosferikos Omilos Athinon (Athens–Piraeus)
- Relegated: none

Statistics of Football Clubs Association Championship in the 1921–22 season. Only the Athens-Piraeus championship was held. It began on 23 January and ended on 10 April 1922.

== Athens-Piraeus Football Clubs Association ==
Pos	Team	Pld	W	D	L	GF	GA	GD	Pts	PAO	PIE	ATH	PIR	EVE	ENG	HNA	KYP
1	Panellinios Podosferikos Omilos Athinon (C)	5	4	1	0	18	0	+18	9		3–0	7–0	0–0	3–0	W^{*}	—	5–0
2	Peiraiki Enosis	5	3	1	1	9	3	+6	7	—		0–0	1–0 (Note: Replay match for the previous 4–0 game that did not count.)	W^{*}	W^{*}	5–0	3–0
3	Athinaikos	5	3	1	1	11	11	0	7	—	—		W^{*}	3–2	W^{*}	5–2	3–0
4	Peiraikos Syndesmos (Note: Withdrew.)	3	1	1	1	12	2	+10	3	—	—	—		W^{*}	W^{*}	12–1	W^{*}
5	Evelpidon team	4	1	1	2	6	7	−1	3	—	—	—	—		3–0	—	1–1
6	English Navy Officers	2	0	1	1	1	4	−3	1	—	—	—	—	—		1–1	W^{*}
7	Hellenic Naval Academy team	4	0	1	3	4	23	−19	1	—	—	—	—	—	—		—
8	Kypriakos Athens	4	0	1	3	1	12	−11	1	—	—	—	—	—	—	—	

Source: rsssf
Legend: Blue = home team win; Yellow = draw; Red = away team win.
(C) Champions
Notes:

^{*}Withdrew.
