= 1911 SEGAS Championship =

7th season of SEGAS Championship

SEGAS Championship
- Season: 1911
- Champions: Panellinios Podosferikos Omilos
- Matches: 3
- Goals: 21 (7 per match)
- Highest scoring: Podosferikos Omilos Athinon 10–2 Peiraikos Syndesmos

The 1911 SEGAS Championship was the seventh championship organized by SEGAS.

== Overview ==
Panellinios Podosferikos Omilos won the championship.

== Teams ==
The only teams that participated were Panellinios Podosferikos Omilos and Peiraikos Syndesmos.

== Matches ==
20 November 1911
First leg

Panellinios Podosferikos Omilos	4–0	Peiraikos Syndesmos
	Report

Neo Phaliron Velodrome

27 November 1911
Second leg

Panellinios Podosferikos Omilos	2–3	Peiraikos Syndesmos
	Report

Neo Phaliron Velodrome
Referee: Campbell

4 December 1911
Play-off

Panellinios Podosferikos Omilos	10–2	Peiraikos Syndesmos
	Report

Neo Phaliron Velodrome

Panellinios Podosferikos Omilos won the championship.
