= 1940–41 Panhellenic Championship =

Incomplete season of top-tier football league in Greece

Panhellenic Championship
- Season: 1940–41
- Champions: none
- Relegated: none

The 1940–41 Panhellenic Championship never finished, because of the WW2. The only championships that started and went on until 28 October 1940, when the Greco-Italian War started, were the Athenian, Piraeus' and Macedonian championship. The point system was: Win: 3 points - Draw: 2 points - Loss: 1 point.

== Qualification round ==
=== Athens Football Clubs Association ===
Pos	Team	Pld	W	D	L	GF	GA	GD	Pts	GOUD	AEK	PAO	ATH	PAG	AST	ATR	ARK
1	Goudi Athens	3	3	0	0	14	1	+13	9		—	—	—	6–0	—	—	6–1
2	AEK Athens	3	3	0	0	12	2	+10	9	—		—	4–1	—	6–0	—	2–1
3	Panathinaikos	3	1	1	1	4	3	+1	6	—	—		—	—	0–0	2–0	—
4	Athinaikos	3	1	1	1	5	7	−2	6	—	—	3–2		—	—	—	—
5	A.O. Pangrati	3	1	1	1	3	6	−3	6	—	—	—	—		—	0–0	3–0
6	Asteras Athens	3	0	2	1	1	7	−6	5	—	—	—	1–1	—		—	—
7	Atromitos	3	0	1	2	0	4	−4	4	0–2	—	—	—	6–0	—		—
8	Arion Kolonaki	3	0	0	3	2	11	−9	3	—	—	—	—	6–0	—	—	

Source: rsssf

Suspended 27 October 1940, with P. Angelopoulos being the top scorer of the association with 8 goals.

=== Piraeus Football Clubs Association ===
Pos	Team	Pld	W	D	L	GF	GA	GD	Pts	OLY	PRO	ETHN	KER	THE	ARIS	ARG
1	Olympiacos	3	3	0	0	13	0	+13	9		—	2–0	7–0	4–0	—	—
2	Proodeftiki	3	1	1	1	8	5	+3	6	—		—	—	—	—	6–2
3	Ethnikos Piraeus	3	1	1	1	7	5	+2	6	—	2–2		—	—	5–1	—
4	Keramikos Kaminia	3	1	1	1	3	9	−6	6	—	1–0	—		—	2–2	—
5	Thiseas Piraeus	2	1	0	1	5	5	0	4	—	—	—	—		—	5–1
6	Aris Piraeus	2	0	1	1	3	7	−4	3	—	—	—	—	—		—
7	Argonaftis Piraeus	2	0	0	2	3	11	−8	2	—	—	—	—	—	—	

Source: rsssf

Suspended 27 October 1940.

=== Macedonia Football Clubs Association ===
Pos	Team	Pld	W	D	L	GF	GA	GD	Pts	ARIS	PAOK	IRA	MENT	MAK	MEG
1	Aris	3	2	1	0	8	2	+6	8		—	2–0	4–0	—	—
2	PAOK	3	2	1	0	9	6	+3	8	2–2		—	5–3	2–1	—
3	Iraklis	3	1	0	2	3	5	−2	5	—	—		—	—	1–0
4	MENT	3	1	0	2	6	11	−5	5	—	—	3–2		—	—
5	Makedonikos	1	0	0	1	1	2	−1	1	—	—	—	—		—
6	Megas Alexandros	1	0	0	1	0	1	−1	1	—	—	—	—	—	

Source: rsssf

Suspended 27 October 1940.

== Final round ==
Not held.
