= 1910–11 SEGAS Championship =

6th season of SEGAS Championship

SEGAS Championship
- Season: 1910–11
- Champions: Podosferikos Omilos Athinon
- Highest scoring: Podosferikos Omilos Athinon 12–0 Goudi Athens
- Longest unbeaten run: Podosferikos Omilos Athinon

The 1910–11 SEGAS Championship was the sixth championship organized by SEGAS.

== Overview ==
Podosferikos Omilos Athinon won the championship.

== Teams ==
Pos	Team	Pld	W	D	L	GF	GA	GD
1	Podosferikos Omilos Athinon (C)	2	2	0	0	23	1	+22
2	Peiraikos Syndesmos	1	0	0	1	1	11	-10
3	Goudi Athens	1	0	0	1	0	12	-12
