= 1922–23 Panhellenic Championship =

1st season of Panhellenic Championship

Panhellenic Championship
- Season: 1922–23
- Champions: Peiraikos Syndesmos
- Relegated: none (Athens–Piraeus) none (Macedonia)
- Matches: 1
- Goals: 4 (4 per match)

The 1922–23 Panhellenic Championship was the first football event that was named Panhellenic Championship and was organized by the Greece Football Clubs Association. They were preceded by the Athens-Piraeus Football Clubs Association Championship and the Macedonia Football Clubs Association Championship under the auspices of Young Men's Christian Association of Thessaloniki. Difficulties, the cost of travel and other problems, led to the decision to judge the title over a single match between the two champions of each association, in which Peiraikos Syndesmos prevailed over Aris by 3–1 or 4–1 (according to two different sources).

== Athens-Piraeus Football Clubs Association ==
=== Qualification round ===
It began on 8 January 1923.

==== Group A ====
Pos	Team	Pld	W	D	L	GF	GA	GD	Pts	Qualification	APOL	PIR	ATH	KYP	GDI
1	Apollon Athens (Q)	2	1	1	0	4	3	+1	3	Athens-Piraeus final round		2–1	2–2	—	—
2	Peiraikos Syndesmos (Q)	2	1	0	1	6	2	+4	2	Athens-Piraeus final round	—		5–0	—	—
3	Athinaikos	2	0	1	1	2	7	−5	1		—	—		—	—
4	Kypriakos Athens (Note: Withdrew)	0	0	0	0	0	0	0	0		—	—	—		—
5	Goudi Athens	0	0	0	0	0	0	0	0		—	—	—	—	

Source: rsssf
(Q) Qualified for the phase indicated

==== Group B ====
Pos	Team	Pld	W	D	L	GF	GA	GD	Pts	Qualification	PAO	PGSS	PIE	CON	FIL
1	Panathinaikos (Q)	4	3	0	1	16	1	+15	6	Athens-Piraeus final round		2–0	—	9–0	5–0
2	Panionios (Q)	4	3	0	1	12	4	+8	6	Athens-Piraeus final round	—		1–0	9–1	2–1
3	Peiraiki Enosis (Q)	4	3	0	1	11	3	+8	6	Athens-Piraeus final round	1–0	—		1–0	9–2
4	PS Concordia	4	1	0	3	5	19	−14	2		—	—	—		4–0
5	Filathloi Piraeus	4	0	0	4	3	20	−17	0		—	—	—	—	

Source: rsssf
(Q) Qualified for the phase indicated

=== Final round ===
It began on 20 May and ended on 1 July 1923.

Pos	Team	Pld	W	D	L	GF	GA	GD	Pts	Qualification	PIR	PGSS	APOL	PIE	PAO
1	Peiraikos Syndesmos (Q)	4	4	0	0	16	6	+10	8	Final		4–3	2–1	4–1	6–1
2	Panionios	4	2	1	1	6	4	+2	5		—		1–0 (Note: Apollon didn't show up to the postponed match and it was awarded to Panionios by 1–0.)	0–0	2–0
3	Apollon Athens	5	1	2	2	6	6	0	4		—	—		2–0	3–3
4	Peiraiki Enosis	5	1	2	2	5	9	−4	4		—	—	—		4–3
5	Panathinaikos	4	0	1	3	7	15	−8	1		—	—	—	—	

Source: rsssf
(Q) Qualified for the phase indicated

== Macedonia Football Clubs Association ==
It began on 17 March and ended on 8 April 1923, when it was interrupted.

Pos	Team	Pld	W	D	L	GF	GA	GD	Pts	Qualification	ARIS	HANT	MEG	EFO	MAX	IRA
1	Aris (Q)	4	4	0	0	9	0	+9	8	Final		—	— (Note: Canceled due to darkness)	1–0 (Note: Awarded)	6–0	1–0
2	HANT	4	2	0	2	9	7	+2	4		—		4–2	—	3–0	—
3	Megas Alexandros	4	2	0	2	5	6	−1	4		—	—		—	—	—
4	Effort Sportive	3	1	0	2	3	3	0	2		—	2–1	—		—	—
5	Max Nordaou	3	1	0	2	4	11	−7	2		—	—	—	4–2		—
6	Iraklis (Note: Withdrew and were zeroed.)	2	1	0	1	2	5	−3	0		—	3–1	—	—	—	

Source: rsssf
(Q) Qualified for the phase indicated

== Final ==
The match took place on 12 August 1923^{*} at Iraklis' Gymnasium and the referee was Petros Saridakis of Iraklis.

Summary
Team 1	Score	Team 2
Peiraikos Syndesmos	3–1^{**}	Aris

Peiraikos Syndesmos won the championship.

^{*} 25 August according to the current Gregorian calendar. According the date was 22 August.

^{**}According to some sources the final score was 4–1.
