= 1908 SEGAS Championship =

3rd season of SEGAS Championship

SEGAS Championship
- Season: 1908
- Champions: Goudi Athens
- Matches: 5
- Goals: 44 (8.8 per match)
- Highest scoring: Goudi Athens 21–0 Panellinios
- Longest winning run: Goudi Athens
- Longest unbeaten run: Goudi Athens

The 1908 SEGAS Championship was the third championship organized by SEGAS.

== Overview ==
Goudi Athens won the championship.

== Teams ==
All 4 teams were either from Athens or Piraeus, despite it being called a Panhellenic Championship, which would imply the competition was nationwide.

Pos	Team	Pld	W	D	L	GF	GA	GD	Pts	GDI	ETH	PIR	PAN
1	Goudi Athens (C)	3	3	0	0	37	1	+36	6		8–1	8–0	21–0
2	Ethnikos G.S. Athens	2	1	0	1	4	8	−4	2	—		—	3–0
3	Peiraikos Syndesmos	2	0	1	1	1	10	−9	1	—	—		1–2
4	Panellinios	3	0	1	2	2	25	−23	1	—	—	—	

Source: RSSSF
Rules for classification: 1) points; 2) goal difference; 3) number of goals scored.
(C) Champions
