= 1947–48 Panhellenic Championship =

14th season of top-tier football league in Greece

Panhellenic Championship
- Season: 1947–48
- Champions: Olympiacos; 8rd Greek title
- Relegated: none
- Matches: 18
- Goals: 14 (0.78 per match)
- Top goalscorer: Stelios Christopoulos (3 goals)
- Biggest home win: Olympiacos 2–1 Apollon Athens; Olympiacos 2–1 PAOK
- Biggest away win: PAOK 0–3 Olympiacos
- Highest scoring: PAOK 0–3 Olympiacos
- Longest winning run: Olympiacos
- Longest unbeaten run: Olympiacos (4 matches)
- Longest winless run: PAOK (4 matches)
- Longest losing run: PAOK

The 1947–48 Panhellenic Championship was the 14th season of the highest football league of Greece. The clubs that participated were the champions from the 3 founding football associations of the HFF: Athens, Piraeus and Macedonia. Olympiacos won the championship in an undefeated run for a 3rd time in their history. The point system was: Win: 3 points - Draw: 2 points - Loss: 1 point.

== Qualification round ==
=== Athens Football Clubs Association ===
Pos	Team	Pld	GF	GA	GD	Pts	Qualification
1	Apollon Athens (Q)	14	31	7	+24	38	Final round
2	Panathinaikos	14	23	10	+13	36	
3	AEK Athens	14	31	23	+8	30	
4	Panionios	14	27	26	+1	27	
5	Fostiras	14	21	24	-3	27	
6	Daphni Athens	14	20	24	-4	26	
7	Asteras Athens	14	20	28	-8	24	
8	Athinaikos	14	10	41	-31	16	

=== Piraeus Football Clubs Association ===
Pos	Team	Pld	GF	GA	GD	Pts	Qualification
1	Olympiacos (Q)	14	53	9	+44	40	Final round
2	Atromitos Piraeus	14	34	23	+11	32	
3	Proodeftiki	14	36	39	-3	31	
4	Ethnikos Piraeus	14	29	18	+11	31	
5	Panelefsiniakos	14	31	29	+2	28	
6	Aris Piraeus	14	26	47	-21	23	
7	Amyna Nikaia	14	18	34	-16	22	
8	AE Neapoli	14	14	12	+2	17	

=== Macedonia Football Clubs Association ===
Pos	Team	Pld	GF	GA	GD	Pts	Qualification
1	PAOK (Q)	10	25	10	+15	28	Final round
2	Aris	10	19	8	+11	24	
3	Iraklis	10	25	12	+13	24	
4	Makedonikos	10	13	17	-4	19	
5	Megas Alexandros	10	19	33	-14	13	
6	Meliteus	10	12	33	-21	12	

== Final round ==
=== League table ===
Pos	Team	Pld	W	D	L	GF	GA	GD	Pts	OLY	APOL	PAOK
1	Olympiacos (C)	4	3	1	0	8	3	+5	11		2–1	2–1
2	Apollon Athens	4	1	2	1	4	4	0	8	1–1		1–0
3	PAOK	4	0	1	3	2	7	−5	5	0–3	1–1	

Source: rsssf
(C) Champions

== Top scorers ==
Rank	Player	Club	Goals
1	(Greece) Stelios Christopoulos	Olympiacos	3
2	(Greece) Alekos Chatzistavridis	Olympiacos	2
2	(Greece) Stratos	Apollon Athens	2
