= 1906 SEGAS Championship =

1st season of SEGAS Championship

SEGAS Championship
- Season: 1906
- Champions: Ethnikos G.S. Athens
- Matches: 3
- Goals: 13 (4.33 per match)
- Highest scoring: Peiraikos Syndesmos 4–3 Panellinios
- Longest unbeaten run: Ethnikos G.S. Athens
- Longest losing run: Panellinios

The 1906 SEGAS Championship was the first competition organised by Hellenic Amateur Athletic Association to take place in mainland Greece in March 1906. However, it was not organised by the Hellenic Football Federation (HFF) and, as such, was not recognised by it.

== Season summary ==
All 3 matches took place at the Neo Phaliron Velodrome in March and April 1906. Ethnikos G.S. Athens won the championship after defeating the other two teams by a 3–0 score.

== Teams ==
All 3 teams were either from Athens or Piraeus, despite it being called a Panhellenic Championship, which would imply the competition was nationwide.

Pos	Team	Pld	W	D	L	GF	GA	GD	Pts	ETH	PIR	PAN
1	Ethnikos G.S. Athens (C)	2	2	0	0	6	0	+6	4		3–0	3–0
2	Peiraikos Syndesmos	2	1	0	1	4	6	−2	2	—		4–3
3	Panellinios	2	0	0	2	3	7	−4	0	—	—	

Source: RSSSF
Rules for classification: 1) points; 2) goal difference; 3) number of goals scored.
(C) Champions
