= Greece Football Clubs Association =

Defunct association football governing body in Greece

Greece Football Clubs Association (Greek: Ένωσις Ποδοσφαιρικών Σωματείων Ελλάδος), founded in 1919 as Athens–Piraeus F.C.A. (Greek: Ε.Π.Σ. Αθηνών–Πειραιώς), was the first governing body of association football in Greece, before the Hellenic Football Federation. Prior to the Greece FCA's founding, football competitions had been organised by the Hellenic Amateur Athletic Association, the Committee of the Olympic Games, or local clubs.

As evidenced by the association's name, it originally included clubs from Athens and Piraeus, however it eventually sought to attain a nationwide status, even staging a national final between the champions of Athens-Piraeus and Thessaloniki in 1923. However, it would collapse the following year, as disputes led to the creation of a separate Athens FCA. FCAs would become the standard local governing bodies throughout the country, whilst a new nationwide body would be formed in 1926.

== History ==
The Athens-Piraeus Football Clubs Association was founded in 1919 by 5 clubs in the wider Athens-Piraeus area: Peiraikos Syndesmos, Peiraiki Enosis (precursors of Olympiacos and Ethnikos Piraeus), Panathinaikos (then named Panellinios Podosfairikos Agonistikos Omilos), Athinaikos and Goudi. The clubs designated Christos Brisimitzakis, silver medalist at the 1889 Zappas Olympics, as chairman. The FCA quickly got to work, staging Greece's first major football competition in 10 years, with the help of the Athens branch of the YMCA. Despite the ongoing war, the FCA successfully organised not only its main annual tournament, but also tournaments for military and student teams.

The first championship was held between autumn 1920 and spring 1921, with all games played at the Neo Phaliron Velodrome, which featured a coal-dust pitch. Panathinaikos claimed this first title, though little informations remains about the tournament. Panathinaikos also won the title during the next season, as the tournament expanded to 8 teams. Between these 2 tournaments, 1870 Zappas Olympian Ioannis Psichas became chairman and the FCA was renamed to the Greece Football Clubs Association.

The FCA reached its peak in 1922, as it welcomed Panionios and Apollon Smyrnis, following the Asia Minor Catastrophe. These clubs came from Smyrna, where football was more developed up to 1922; Manolis Marsellos, 3-times Panionian Games gold medallist was chosen as the Association's new chairman. Soon the FCA worked with the Thessaloniki branch of the YMCA to set up a tournament between the city's top clubs, the winner of which would face the winner of the Athens-Piraeus tournament in a panhellenic final. Peiraikos Syndesmos was the winner of this title.

However, the FCA would soon collapse, following the election of Greek football's founding father Panagis Vrionis as chairman. Despite the Association's constant expansion, its recognition as Greece's sole legitimate governing body of football by the Hellenic Amateur Athletic Association and its plans to become a Federation, supported by local FCAs (with the first being the Macedonia-Thrace FCA in January 1924), friction between the clubs of Athens and those of Piraeus would tear the FCA apart, as Apollon and Panathinaikos left the Association, followed by the rest of the Athenian clubs, except Goudi. As the Athenian clubs formed the Athens FCA, the GFCA dissolved itself, with the Piraeus clubs forming the Piraeus FCA.

== Competitions ==
The Greece FCA organised its main football competition in Athens and Piraeus, while also helping form a competition in Thessaloniki; it also staged a final between the winners of the 2 competitions.

Winners
Season	Athens-Piraeus tournament	Thessaloniki tournament	National final
1920–21	Panellinios PAO	Not held	Not held
1921–22	Panellinios PAO	Not held	Not held
1923–24	Piraeus Athletics and Football Club	Aris Thessaloniki	Not held

Winners
Season	Panhellenic Championship	1922–23	National final
1922–23	Peiraikos Syndesmos	Aris Thessaloniki	Peiraikos Syndesmos

== Chairmen ==
During its existence, the Greece FCA had 4 chairmen, all noted athletes in their own right.

Chairmen
Tenure	Name
1919–21	Christos Brisimitzakis
1921–22	Ioannis Psichas
1922–23	Manolis Marsellos
1923–24	Panagis Vrionis
