= 1925–26 FCA Championship =

4th season of FCA Championship

Football Clubs Association
- Season: 1925–26
- Champions: Panathinaikos (Athens); Olympiacos (Piraeus); Aris (Macedonia)
- Relegated: Attikos (Athens) none (Piraeus); AEK Thessaloniki, Megas Alexandros (Macedonia)

Statistics of Football Clubs Association Championship for the 1925–26 season.

== Athens Football Clubs Association ==
Pos	Team	Pld	W	D	L	GF	GA	GD	Pts	PAO	APOL	AEK	ATR	ARM	ATH	ATT
1	Panathinaikos (C)	8	6	2	0	27	5	+22	14		0–0	0–0	2–1	4–1	9–0	5–1
2	Apollon Athens	7	6	1	0	15	6	+9	13			2–1 (Note: From this match it was judged whether AEK would continue to have chances of winning the title, given that their following match with Panathinaikos. The game was episodic and in the middle of the second half two opposing players engaged in a fight. The referee ordered their dismissal. AEK officers entered the stadium protesting and eventually AEK left. Then the board of AFCA instead of awarding the match in favor of Apollon, ordered the replay of the match, in which Apollon threatened not to show up. Meanwhile, Panathinaikos defeated AEK in the match between them and won the title, so the replay was of any importance and was canceled with the match being awarded to Apollon by 2–1, which was the score before the interruption.)	0–2 (Note: Without match)		3–0	2–1
3	AEK Athens	7	4	1	2	12	7	+5	9	1–3					1–0	4–0
4	Atromitos	7	2	1	4	20	12	+8	5					1–1	5–1	2–0
5	Armeniki Enosi	6	2	0	4	6	11	−5	4							0–0
6	Athinaikos	9	2	0	7	10	27	−17	4	1–4	1–4	8–0	3–2			
7	Attikos (R)	6	0	1	5	5	27	−22	1							

Source: rsssf
(C) Champions; (R) Relegated

== Piraeus Football Clubs Association ==
Pos	Team	Pld	W	D	L	GF	GA	GD	Pts
1	Olympiacos (C)	5	5	0	0	20	5	+15	10
2	Ethnikos Piraeus	5	3	1	1	10	5	+5	7
3	Megas Alexandros Piraeus	5	2	1	2	8	13	−5	5
4	Falirikos Syndesmos	5	1	2	2	9	11	−2	4
5	Enosi Filathlon Neapolis	5	1	0	4	3	6	−3	2
6	Titan-Panpiraikos	5	1	0	4	3	13	−10	2

Source: rsssf
(C) Champions

== Macedonia Football Clubs Association ==
Pos	Team	Pld	W	D	L	GF	GA	GD	Pts	ARIS	IRA	ATL	THER	AEK	MEG
1	Aris (C)	7	7	0	0	26	6	+20	14		5–2	3–0	1–0	2–0	—
2	Iraklis	7	4	0	3	15	13	+2	8	1–4		3–1	3–0	2–0 (Note: Without match)	—
3	Atlantas Thessaloniki	7	3	0	4	10	12	−2	6	1–3	2–0		2–0	—	—
4	Thermaikos	8	1	1	6	6	20	−14	3	2–8	1–4	2–1		—	—
5	AEK Thessaloniki (Note: Withdrew in the second round) (R)	4	0	1	3	2	8	−6	1	—	—	1–3	1–1		—
6	Megas Alexandros (Note: Withdrew after one game) (R)	0	0	0	0	0	0	0	0	—	—	—	— (Note: The match took place on January 31 and ended with 3-0 in favor of Megas Alexandros, while Thermaikos then filed an objection requesting a replay of the match, which he won, but until the game was replayed, the Megas Alexandros had already withdrawn from the championship.)	—	

Source: rsssf
(C) Champions; (R) Relegated
