= 1924–25 FCA Championship =

3rd season of FCA Championship

Football Clubs Association
- Season: 1924–25
- Champions: Panathinaikos (Athens); Olympiacos (Piraeus)
- Relegated: Aias Athens, Goudi Athens (Athens) none (Piraeus)

Statistics of Football Clubs Association Championship in the 1924–25 season.

== Athens Football Clubs Association ==
=== Group A ===
It began on 23 November 1924 and ended on 11 January 1925.

Pos	Team	Pld	W	D	L	GF	GA	GD	Pts	Qualification	ATR	ARM	ATH	LEN	AIAS
1	Atromitos (Q)	4	3	1	0	14	2	+12	7	Final round		1–0	2–2	4–0	7–0
2	Armeniki Enosi (Q)	4	3	0	1	10	3	+7	6	Final round	—		4–2	1–0	5–0
3	Athinaikos	4	1	2	1	10	10	0	4		—	—		4–4	2–0
4	Lenorman	4	1	1	2	9	10	−1	3		—	—	—		5–1
5	Aias Athens (R)	4	0	0	4	1	19	−18	0		—	—	—	—	

Source: rsssf
(Q) Qualified for the phase indicated; (R) Relegated

=== Group B ===
It began on 14 December 1924 and ended on 18 January 1925.

Pos	Team	Pld	W	D	L	GF	GA	GD	Pts	Qualification	PAO	AEK	APOL	GDI
1	Panathinaikos (Q)	3	3	0	0	13	1	+12	6	Final round		2–0	3–1	8–0
2	AEK Athens (Q)	3	2	0	1	8	4	+4	4	Final round	—		4–0	4–2
3	Apollon Athens	3	1	0	2	5	7	−2	2		—	—		4–0
4	Goudi Athens (R)	3	0	0	3	2	16	−14	0		—	—	—	

Source: rsssf
(Q) Qualified for the phase indicated; (R) Relegated

=== Athens final round ===
Semi-finals
Team 1	Score	Team 2
Panathinaikos	4–0	Atromitos
AEK Athens	1–0	Armeniki Enosi

Final
Team 1	Score	Team 2
Panathinaikos	1–0	AEK Athens

8 March 1925
Final

Panathinaikos	1–0	AEK Athens
Nikolaidis 58' (pen.)

Leoforos Alexandras Stadium, Ampelokipoi

Panathinaikos won the championship.

== Piraeus Football Clubs Association ==
=== Group A ===
Pos	Team	Pld	W	D	L	GF	GA	GD	Pts	Qualification	OLY	MEG	TIT
1	Olympiacos (Q)	2	2	0	0	7	2	+5	4	Final round		2–0	5–2
2	Megas Alexandros Piraeus (Q)	2	1	0	1	7	2	+5	2	Final round	—		7–0
3	Titan-Panpeiraikos	2	0	0	2	2	12	−10	0		—	—	

Source: rsssf
(Q) Qualified for the phase indicated

=== Group B ===
Pos	Team	Pld	W	D	L	GF	GA	GD	Pts	Qualification	PIR	NEA	FAL
1	Peiraikos (Q)	2	2	0	0	9	1	+8	4	Final round		3–1	6–0
2	Enosi Filathlon Neapolis (Q)	2	1	0	1	3	4	−1	2	Final round	—		2–1
3	Falirikos Syndesmos	2	0	0	2	1	8	−7	0		—	—	

Source: rsssf
(Q) Qualified for the phase indicated

=== Piraeus final round ===
Semi-finals
Team 1	Score	Team 2
Olympiacos	13–0	Enosi Filathlon Neapolis
Peiraikos	3–2	Megas Alexandros Piraeus

The final took place on 17 May 1925 at Leoforos Alexandras Stadium.

Final
Team 1	Score	Team 2
Olympiacos	4–2	Peiraikos

Olympiacos won the championship.
