= 1923–24 FCA Championship =

2nd season of FCA Championship

Football Clubs Association
- Season: 1923–24
- Champions: Apollon Athens (Athens); APS Piraeus (Athens–Piraeus); Aris (Macedonia)
- Relegated: Panionios (Athens) none (Athens–Piraeus) none (Macedonia)

Statistics of Football Clubs Association Championship in the 1923–24 season.

== Athens Football Clubs Association ==
Pos	Team	Pld	W	D	L	GF	GA	GD	Pts	Qualification	APOL	PAO	MIL	ATH	PGSS
1	Apollon Athens (Q)	4	2	2	0	6	3	+3	6	Final round		1–1	2–0	2–2	1–0
2	Panathinaikos (Q)	2	1	1	0	3	1	+2	3	Final round	—		2–0	—	—
3	Milon Athens	3	1	0	2	1	4	−3	2		—	—		1–0	—
4	Athinaikos	2	0	1	1	2	3	−1	1		—	—	—		—
5	Panionios (R)	1	0	0	1	0	1	−1	0		—	—	—	—	

(Q) Qualified for the phase indicated; (R) Relegated

^{*}Known results only.

The match took place on 8 June 1924 at Leoforos Alexandras Stadium.

Final round
Team 1	Score	Team 2
Apollon Athens	1–0	Panathinaikos

Apollon Athens won the championship.

== Athens-Piraeus Football Clubs Association ==
It began on 3 January and ended on 2 March 1924.

Pos	Team	Pld	W	D	L	GF	GA	GD	Pts	APS	OFP	PGSS	ATH	PAO	NEA	GDI	APOL
1	APS Piraeus (C)	11	9	1	1	54	7	+47	19		5–1	1–0	6–0	—	9–0	10–1 (Note: The match was originally for January 20, but it was not held, because Panathinaikos informed that they were withdrawing the Athens-Piraeus' Association and would not give their stadium. It was eventually conducted on 2 March 1924 at Goudi Stadium.)	3–1 (Note: Apollon quit the match at the 70th minute without reason.)
2	Omilos Filathlon Piraeus	8	5	1	2	13	9	+4	11	1–1		1–0	1–0 (Note: Awarded)	—	2–0	4–0	—
3	Panionios	10	5	0	5	15	11	+4	10	1–6	1–0		7–1	—	1–0	4–2	—
4	Athinaikos (Note: Panathinaikos, Apollon Athens, Athinaikos and Neapolis withdrew and had fewer games. All their matches with teams that continued were awarded in favor of the opponents but without a score.)	8	3	1	4	15	23	−8	7	—	2–1	0–1		3–2 (Note: After the match Panathinaikos withdrew from the championship, claiming that the referee was unfair to them.)	6–2	3–3	—
5	Panathinaikos	3	2	0	1	14	3	+11	4	2–0	—	—	—		—	10–0	—
6	Enosi Filathlon Neapolis	8	2	0	6	3	25	−22	4	0–1	—	—	1–0	—		?	—
7	Goudi Athens	8	2	1	5	7	45	−38	5	0–12	0–2	—	—	—	1–0		—
8	Apollon Athens	3	1	0	2	7	4	+3	2	—	—	0–1	—	—	6–0	—	

Source: Athletic Echo
(C) Champions

== Macedonia Football Clubs Association ==
Pos	Team	Pld	W	D	L	GF	GA	GD	Pts	ARIS	IRA	MEG
1	Aris (C)	2	2	0	0	14	1	+13	4		4–1	10–0
2	Iraklis	2	1	0	1	4	4	0	2	—		3–0
3	Megas Alexandros	2	0	0	2	0	13	−13	0	—	—	

Source: rsssf
(C) Champions
