= 1909 SEGAS Championship =

4th season of SEGAS Championship

SEGAS Championship
- Season: 1909
- Champions: Peiraikos Syndesmos

The 1909 SEGAS Championship was the fourth championship organized by SEGAS.

== Overview ==
Peiraikos Syndesmos won the championship.

== Teams ==
Pos	Team
1	Peiraikos Syndesmos (C)
2	Goudi Athens
3	Podosferikos Omilos Athinon
4	Ethnikos G.S. Athens
