= 1914 SEGAS Championship =

9th season of SEGAS Championship

SEGAS Championship
- Season: 1914
- Champions: Athinaikos Syllogos Podosfairiseos

The 1914 SEGAS Championship was the ninth championship organized by SEGAS. It was organized in April 1914 under the name "Panhellenic Football Games".

== Overview ==
Athinaikos Syllogos Podosfairiseos won the championship.

== Teams ==
The teams that participated were Athinaikos Syllogos Podosfairiseos, Peiraiki Enosis and Korivos. All the games took place at Neo Phaliron Velodrome. Athinaikos Syllogos Podosfairiseos and Peiraiki Enosis were qualified to the final where Athinaikos won the title.
