= 1912 SEGAS Championship =

8th season of SEGAS Championship

SEGAS Championship
- Season: 1912
- Champions: Goudi Athens
- Highest scoring: Goudi Athens 9–1 Panellinios
- Longest unbeaten run: Goudi Athens

The 1912 SEGAS Championship was the eighth championship organized by SEGAS.

== Overview ==
Goudi Athens won the championship.

== Teams ==
Pos	Team	Pld	W	D	L	GF	GA	GD
1	Goudi Athens (C)	4	4	0	0	20	3	+17
	Ethnikos G.S. Athens							
	Panellinios							
	Podosferikos Omilos Athinon							
	Evelpidon team							
