= Peiraikos Syndesmos =

Multisports club in Greece

Piraikos Syndesmos
- Full name: Πειραϊκός Σύνδεσμος; Piraikos Syndesmos; (Piraean Association)
- Founded: 22 October 1894; 130 years ago
- Based in: Piraeus, Greece
- Colours: Blue, White
- President: Evaggelos Karlaftis
- Website: peiraikos.gr

Piraikos Syndesmos (Greek: Πειραϊκός Σύνδεσμος, lit. 'Piraean Association') or simply Piraikos, is one of the oldest sports clubs in Greece, based in Piraeus. It was founded on 22 October 1894. Today Piraikos has departments in basketball, volleyball, and track and field. The previous years it had departments in association football, swimming, handball, and water polo.

== Active departments ==
- Piraikos Syndesmos Basketball team
- Piraikos Syndesmos Volleyball team
- Piraikos Syndesmos Track and Field team

== History ==
Piraikos was founded on 22 October 1894. The club was one of the founder members of SEGAS. Piraikos was the first club which founded a football team in Piraeus. It won a Panhellenic football championship in 1923 and the first Greek water polo championship. The basketball team of Piraikos was founded in 1935. It has played two times in A1 Ethniki (first division), in the 1991-92 and 1996-97 seasons. The women's basketball team has won two championships, in 1969 and 1970. Piraikos volleyball team was founded in 1929. It was the club that brought volleyball to the city of Piraeus. Today, it is a women's volleyball team.

== Honours ==
Peiraikos Syndesmos
Home colours

=== Piraikos Football team (defunct) ===
- Panhellenic Football Championship
  - Winner (2): 1909, 1923

=== Piraikos Basketball team (Women) ===
- Greek Championship
  - Winner (2): 1969, 1970

=== Piraikos Athletics team ===
- Panhellenic championship (1): 1935

=== Piraikos Water polo team ===
- Panhellenic championship (1): 1923
