= Macedonia Football Clubs Association =

Association football governing body in Thessaloniki Prefecture, Greece

- Full name: Macedonia Football Clubs Association; Greek: Ένωση Ποδοσφαιρικών Σωματείων Μακεδονίας
- Short name: Macedonia F.C.A.; Greek: Ε.Π.Σ. Μακεδονίας
- Founded: 1924; 102 years ago
- Headquarters: Thessaloniki, Greece
- FIFA affiliation: Hellenic Football Federation
- President: Savvas Dimitriadis
- Website: epsm.gr

Macedonia Football Clubs Association (Greek: Ένωση Ποδοσφαιρικών Σωματείων Μακεδονίας) is a governing body responsible for administering association football in Thessaloniki Prefecture. It was formed in 1924 as Macedonia–Thrace Football Association (Greek: Ποδοσφαιρική Ένωσις Μακεδονίας–Θράκης) and it administrated association football in the regions of West Macedonia, Central Macedonia and East Macedonia and Thrace. Since 1935 its area of responsibility was restricted within the borders of the Prefecture of Thessaloniki. Founding members of the union were Aris, Iraklis and Megas Alexandros.

== Current ==
Nowadays the Union runs 4 amateur divisions (fourth to seventh tier in a national level), with 238 clubs participating in them, and a cup competition between the clubs that are members of the Union, and participate either in the Union's championships or in the semi-professional Gamma Ethniki. 238 football clubs participate in the championships organised by the Union itself. 9 clubs of the union participate in the Delta Ethniki championship, 2 in Football League 2, 1 in Football League and 3 in the Super League Greece. It also holds U-16 and U-18 sides that compete in the respective national interregional championships.

== EPSM Championships (1923–1959) ==
Macedonia Football Clubs Association Championship
- First season: 1923–24
- Country: Greece
- Confederation: HFF
- Divisions: 4
- Number of clubs: 163
- Level on pyramid: 4–7
- Promotion to: Gamma Ethniki
- League cup: Macedonia FCA Cup
- Broadcaster(s): Egnatia TV (highlights)
- Website: http://www.epsm.gr/

From its foundation to 1959 (the year of the foundation of the nationwide championship of Alpha Ethniki) the Union of Football Clubs of Macedonia organised a league that was considered the top tier of football in Northern Greece, and its winner was proclaimed "EPSM champion".

=== List of EPSM champions 1923–1959 ===
- 1922–23: Aris
- 1923–24: Aris
- 1924–25: Not held
- 1925–26: Aris
- 1926–27: Iraklis
- 1927–28: Aris
- 1928–29: Aris
- 1929–30: Aris
- 1930–31: Aris
- 1931–32: Megas Alexandros Thessaloniki
- 1933–34: Aris
- 1934–35: Not held
- 1935–36: Not held
- 1936–37: PAOK
- 1937–38: Aris
- 1938–39: Iraklis
- 1939–40: Iraklis
- 1940–45: Not held due to World War II
- 1945–46: Aris
- 1946–47: Makedonikos
- 1947–48: PAOK
- 1948–49: Aris
- 1949–50: PAOK
- 1950–51: Iraklis
- 1951–52: Iraklis
- 1952–53: Aris
- 1953–54: PAOK
- 1954–55: PAOK
- 1955–56: PAOK
- 1956–57: PAOK
- 1957–58: Apollon Kalamarias
- 1958–59: Aris

=== Winners ===
Club	Titles	Years
Aris	13	1922–23, 1923–24, 1925–26, 1927–28, 1928–29, 1929–30, 1930–31, 1933–34, 1937–38, 1945–46, 1948–49, 1952–53, 1958–59
PAOK	7	1936–37, 1947–48, 1949–50, 1953–54, 1954–55, 1955–56, 1956–57
Iraklis	5	1926–27, 1938–39, 1939–40, 1950–51, 1951–52
Megas Alexandros Thessaloniki	1	1931–32
Makedonikos	1	1946–47
Apollon Kalamarias	1	1957–58
