= Football at the 1906 Intercalated Games – Men's team squads =

The following is a list of squads for each team competing in men's football at the 1906 Intercalated Games in Athens.

Ages as of the start of the tournament, 23 April 1906.

== (Greece) Athens ==
No.	Pos.	Player	Date of birth (age)	Club
	MF	Konstantinos Botasis		(Greece) Ethnikos Athens
	FW	Panagiotis Botasis		(Greece) Ethnikos Athens
	DF	Nikolaos Dekavalas		(Greece) Ethnikos Athens
	DF	Georgios Gerontakis		(Greece) Ethnikos Athens
	MF	Omiros Iosifoglou		(Greece) Ethnikos Athens
	MF	Alexandros Kalafatis (One source lists Georgios Kalafatis, the brother of Alexandros)		(Greece) Panellinios GS
	FW	Georgios Merkouris	0 December 1886 (aged 19–20)	(Greece) Ethnikos Athens
	FW	Georgios Pantos		(Greece) Ethnikos Athens
	FW	Konstantinos Siriotis		(Greece) Ethnikos Athens
	FW	Grigorios Vryonis		(Greece) Ethnikos Athens
	GK	Panagiotis Vryonis		(Greece) Ethnikos Athens
		Ioannis Giannikostas		
		Takis Georgiadis		(Greece) Ethnikos Athens
		Ch. Gryparis		
		Ar. Kydonakis		
		F. Lavranos		
		Ioannis Oikonomou	0 December 1860 (aged 45–46)	
		... Papaonannou		
		Al. Paspatis		
		G. Vavaris		

== Denmark ==
No.	Pos.	Player	Date of birth (age)	Club
	MF	Aage Andersen	1 December 1883 (aged 22)	(Denmark) Akademisk BK
	GK	Vigo Andersen	30 July 1884 (aged 21)	(Denmark) B93 København
	FW	Charles Buchwald	22 October 1880 (aged 25)	(Denmark) Akademisk BK
	MF	Parmo Ferslev	17 March 1883 (aged 23)	(Denmark) KB
	FW	Holger Frederiksen	30 January 1881 (aged 25)	(Denmark) Akademisk BK
	DF	Hjalmar Heerup	14 April 1886 (aged 20)	(Denmark) Akademisk BK
	FW	August Lindgren	1 August 1883 (aged 22)	(Denmark) B93 København
	FW	Oskar Nielsen	4 October 1882 (aged 23)	(Denmark) KB
	DF	Peder Pedersen	12 September 1882 (aged 23)	(Denmark) KB
	FW	Carl Frederik Pedersen	9 December 1883 (aged 22)	(Denmark) Akademisk BK
	FW	Henry Rambusch	16 October 1881 (aged 24)	(Denmark) B93 København
	MF	Stefan Rasmussen	11 April 1880 (aged 26)	(Denmark) BK Frem
	MF	Harald Bohr	22 April 1887 (aged 19)	(Denmark) Akademisk BK
	DF	Axel Hansen	30 June 1882 (aged 23)	(Denmark) B93 København
	DF	Harald Hansen	14 March 1884 (aged 22)	(Denmark) B93 København
	FW	Thorald Petersen	1 November 1885 (aged 20)	(Denmark) B93 København

== (Greece) Smyrna ==
No.	Pos.	Player	Date of birth (age)	Club
	DF	(France) Edmund Giraud	29 November 1880 (aged 25)	(Ottoman Empire) Bournabat FC
	MF	(France) Jim Giraud	14 May 1882 (aged 23)	(Ottoman Empire) Bournabat FC
	MF	(France) Henri Joly		(Ottoman Empire) Bournabat FC
	GK	(United Kingdom) Edwin Charnaud	0 December 1886 (aged 19–20)	(Ottoman Empire) Bournabat FC
	MF	(United Kingdom) Percy La Fontaine	0 December 1888 (aged 17–18)	(Ottoman Empire) Bournabat FC
	FW	(United Kingdom) Albert Whittall	14 June 1879 (aged 26)	(Ottoman Empire) Bournabat FC
	FW	(United Kingdom) Donald Whittall	25 February 1881 (aged 25)	(Ottoman Empire) Bournabat FC
	FW	(United Kingdom) Edward Whittall	5 May 1888 (aged 17)	(Ottoman Empire) Bournabat FC
	FW	(United Kingdom) Godfrey Whittall	24 December 1882 (aged 23)	(Ottoman Empire) Bournabat FC
	FW	(United Kingdom) Herbert Whittall	0 December 1884 (aged 21–22)	(Ottoman Empire) Bournabat FC
	DF	(United Kingdom) Zareh Couyoumdjian	0 December 1883 (aged 22–23)	(Ottoman Empire) Bournabat FC

== (Greece) Thessaloníki ==
No.	Pos.	Player	Date of birth (age)	Club
	FW	Ioannis Abbot		(Greece) Omilos Filomuson
	FW	Antonios Karangonidis		(Greece) Omilos Filomuson
	MF	Ioannis Kyrou		(Greece) Omilos Filomuson
	FW	Dimitrios Michitsopoulos		(Greece) Omilos Filomuson
	MF	Nikolaos Pentsikis		(Greece) Omilos Filomuson
	DF	Nikolaos Pindos		(Greece) Omilos Filomuson
	FW	Ioannis Saridakis	0 December 1888 (aged 17–18)	(Greece) Omilos Filomuson
	MF	Georgios Sotiriadis		(Greece) Omilos Filomuson
	DF	Antonios Tegos		(Greece) Omilos Filomuson
	GK	Georgios Vaporis	0 December 1880 (aged 25–26)	(Greece) Omilos Filomuson
	FW	Vasilios Zarkadis		(Greece) Omilos Filomuson
