= Whittall =

Whittall is a surname. Notable people with the surname include:

- Andy Whittall (born 1973), Zimbabwean cricketer
- Arnold Whittall (1935–2026), British musicologist and writer
- Beth Whittall (1936–2015), Canadian competitive swimmer
- Guy Whittall (born 1972), Zimbabwean cricketer
- James Whittall (1800s), British businessman in Hong Kong
- Sam Whittall (born 1993), British footballer
- Ted Whittall, British-born Canadian actor
- Zoe Whittall (born 1976), Canadian poet, novelist, and TV writer

== The Whittalls of Smyrna ==
- Donald Whittall (1881–1959), Anglo-Ottoman footballer who played at the 1906 Intercalated Games
- Edward Whittall (1851–1917), British-Ottoman merchant and plant collector
  - Albert Whittall (1879–1957), Anglo-Ottoman footballer who played at the 1906 Intercalated Games
  - Godfrey Whittall (1882–1957), Anglo-Ottoman footballer who played at the 1906 Intercalated Games
  - Edward Whittall (1888–1947), Anglo-Ottoman footballer who played at the 1906 Intercalated Games
- Herbert Whittall (1858–1929), Anglo-Ottoman businessman, footballer, and manager
  - Herbert Whittall (1884–1953), Anglo-Ottoman footballer who played at the 1906 Intercalated Games
