= Mixed team at the 1906 Intercalated Games =

- IOC code: ZZX
- NOC: Mixed team
- Competitors: 14 in 2 sports
- Medals: Gold 0 Silver 2 Bronze 0 Total 2

Summer appearances
- 1896; 1900; 1904

Early Olympic Games allowed for individuals in a team to be from different nations. The International Olympic Committee (IOC) groups their results together under the mixed team designation (IOC code ZZX). There were also mixed teams at the 1906 Summer Olympics in Athens, now called the Intercalated Games and no longer considered as an official Olympic Games by the International Olympic Committee. During the 1906 Intercalated Games two teams comprising international members won medals in different events.

== Medalists ==
Medal	Name	Sport	Event
Silver	Smyrna; Edmund Giraud (FRA); Jim Giraud (FRA); Henri Joly (FRA); Edwin Charnaud (GBR); Percy La Fontaine (GBR); Albert Whittall (GBR); Donald Whittall (GBR); Edward Whittall (GBR); Godfrey Whittall (GBR); Herbert Whittall (GBR); Zareh Couyoumdjian (GBR)	Football	Men
Silver	Max Orban (BEL); Rémy Orban (BEL); Theofilos Psiliakos (GRE)	Rowing	Coxed pairs (1 mile)

== Football ==
Smyrna were a team from the Ottoman Empire, in fact the Bournabat Football Club, although none of the players were from Turkey and included English and French players.

Squad
Edmund Giraud (FRA)
Jim Giraud (FRA)
Henri Joly (FRA)
Edwin Charnaud (GBR)
Percy La Fontaine (GBR)
Albert Whittall (GBR)
Donald Whittall (GBR)
Edward Whittall (GBR)
Godfrey Whittall (GBR)
Herbert Whittall (GBR)
Zareh Couyoumdjian (GBR)

Semifinals

23 April 1906
12:00

Denmark	5–1	Smyrna
	Report

Podilatodromio, Athens
Attendance: 3000
Referee: Gösta Drake (Sweden)

Second place match

Following Athens' failure to appear for the second half of the final, the tournament organisers ordered Athens, Smyrna and Thessaloniki to play off for second place: Athens refused, and were ejected from the competition.

25 April 1906
11:30

Smyrna	12–0	(Greece) Thessaloniki
	Report

Podilatodromio, Athens
Referee: Carl Andersen (Denmark)

Final rank
Silver

== Rowing ==
The Belgian Orban brothers arrived in Greece without a coxswain, as they didn't know they required one, so they recruited a young Greek called Theophilos Psiliakos.

Athlete	Events	Final	
Athlete	Events	Result	Rank
Max Orban (BEL); Rémy Orban (BEL); Theophilos Psiliakos (GRE)	Coxed pairs (1 km)	Unknown	5
Max Orban (BEL); Rémy Orban (BEL); Theophilos Psiliakos (GRE)	Coxed pairs (1 mile)	8:00.0	2nd place, silver medalist(s)
