= Edward Whittall =

Edward Whittall may refer to:

- Edward Whittall (botanist) (1851-1917), Ottoman botanist and merchant
- Edward Whittall (footballer) (1888-1947), Turkish footballer and son of above
