= Herbert Whittall =

Herbert Whittall may refer to:

- Herbert Whittall (footballer, 1858-1929), Ottoman football forward and manager of Bournabat FC
- Herbert Whittall (footballer, 1884-1953), Turkish football forward and son of above
