= Stefan Rasmussen (footballer) =

Danish footballer (1880–1951)

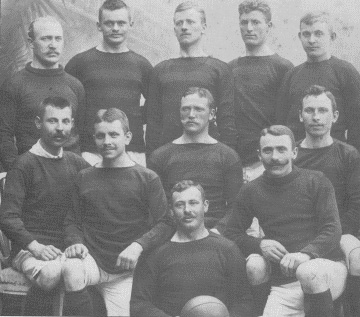
- Rasmussen (standing, second from left) in 1902

Personal information
- Date of birth: 11 April 1880
- Place of birth: Copenhagen, Denmark
- Date of death: 3 March 1951 (aged 70)
- Place of death: Gentofte, Denmark
- Position: Midfielder

Senior career*
Years	Team	Apps	(Gls)
1901–1911	Boldklubben Frem		

International career
1906	Denmark	2	(+0)
Medal record
Men's football
Representing Denmark
Football at the Summer Olympics
Gold medal – first place	1906 Athens	Team competition
- * Club domestic league appearances and goals

Stefan Rasmussen (11 April 1880 – 3 March 1951) was a Danish footballer who played as a midfielder for Boldklubben Frem at the start of the 20th century. He competed in the football tournament at the 1906 Intercalated Games in Athens, winning a gold medal as a member of the Denmark team.

== Playing career ==
Born in Copenhagen on 11 April 1880, Stefan Rasmussen began his career at his hometown club Boldklubben Frem in 1901, aged 21. He made his competitive debut in the Fodboldturneringen on 6 October 1901, scoring a goal to help his side claim its first victory (2–1) over Akademisk Boldklub in 17 matches. Together with Axel Andersen Byrval and Louis Østrup, Rasmussen was a member of the Frem team that went on to win the 1901–02 Football Tournament. He remained loyal to Frem for a full decade, playing his last game on 10 December 1911, in a 6–1 away victory against Boldklubben af 1893. In total, he scored 3 goals in 55 league appearances.

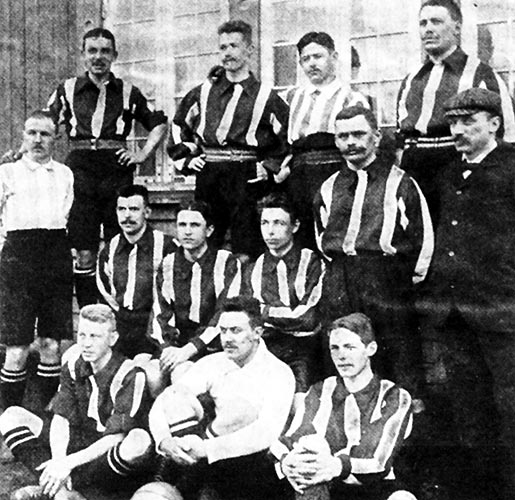
Rasmussen with the Copenhagen city selection in 1906.

In April 1906, Rasmussen was a member of the first-ever version of a Denmark national team, which participated in the football tournament of the 1906 Intercalated Games in Athens. The team that represented Denmark was made up of players from the Copenhagen Football Association (KBU), with Rasmussen being the only member of Frem. Despite being a full-back, he played the tournament as a half-back, the position from which he helped Denmark win an unofficial gold medal, beating the hosts Athens in the final 9–0.

In addition to football, Rasmussen also found success as an athlete, winning the Danish championship in pentathlon twice and being a member of the Danish team in relay races on several occasions.

== Later life ==
Professionally, Rasmussen worked as a master stonemason, moving his business to the Ordrup, a district of the Gentofte Municipality, located near Klampenborg, where he co-founded Skovshoved IF in June 1909, being one of its most active members in the early 1910s, and even reportedly becoming its chairman in 1914. He later also founded Nordre Birks Boldspil-Union, which he served as its first chairman.

== Death ==
Rasmussen remained a faithful member of Frem until he died in Gentofte on 3 March 1951, at the age of 70.

== Honours ==
=== Club ===
Boldklubben Frem

- Fodboldturneringen
  - Champions (1): 1901–02

=== International ===
Denmark

- Intercalated Games
  - Gold medalists (1): 1906
