= Edward Whittall (footballer) =

Anglo-Ottoman footballer (1888–1947)

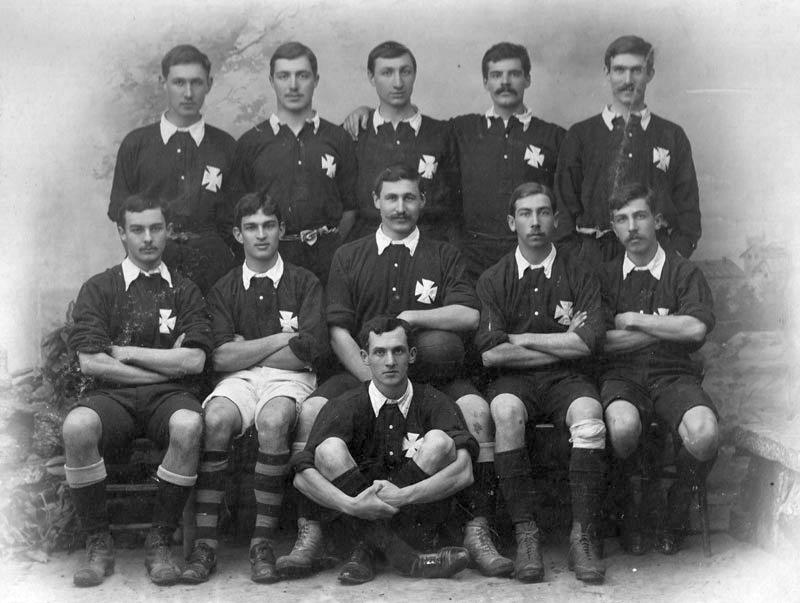
- Whittall (standing, first from left) in 1906

Personal information
- Full name: Edward Sidney Whittall
- Date of birth: 5 May 1888
- Place of birth: İzmir, Ottoman Empire
- Date of death: 13 June 1947 (aged 59)
- Place of death: Uxbridge, England
- Position: Forward

Senior career*
Years	Team	Apps	(Gls)
1904–1906	Bournabat FC		

International career
1906	Smyrna XI	2	(+0)
Medal record
Men's football
Representing Turkey
Football at the Summer Olympics
Silver medal – second place	1906 Athens	Team competition
- * Club domestic league appearances and goals

Edward Sidney Whittall (5 May 1888 – 13 June 1947) was an Anglo-Ottoman footballer who played as a forward for Bournabat FC and was one of five members of the Whittall family who competed in the football tournament at the 1906 Intercalated Games in Athens, winning a silver medal as a member of the Bournabat Olympic team representing Smyrna.

== Early life ==
Edward Whittall was born in İzmir on 5 May 1888, as the eighth of nine children from the marriage of Mary Maltass (1851–1938) and Edward Whittall, an Anglo-Ottoman merchant and amateur botanist.

The founder of the family was the Liverpool-born Charlton Whittall (1791–1867), who worked for a trading company in his hometown, which sent him to Smyrna (now İzmir), a major sea port, where he later set up his own trading company named C. Whittall & Co. This firm exported Turkish products to England, and was thus later absorbed by the Levant Company, a trading company that controlled and regulated trade between England and Turkey.

== Playing career ==
Whittall began playing football at Bournabat FC, which had been founded in Bornova in the late 1880s by several young merchants from the vast colony of Westerners living in Levant, specifically of British and French nationality, such as prominent members of the wealthy Whithall and La Fontaine families residing in Izmir; in fact, in Bournabat's first-ever recorded match in 1894, the club fielded several members of those families, including his uncle Herbert and his older brother Albert, who played a crucial role in helping Bournabat became the strongest team in Smyrna in the 1890s.

In 1904, Edward and his brother Albert started for a Smyrna XI in an inter-city match against Istanbul, helping their side to a 4–2 victory. This meant that football in Smyrna was the best one in the Ottoman Empire, hence why the Greeks invited a team from that region to participate in the 1906 Intercalated Games in Athens. The team that represented Smyrna at the Olympics was entirely composed of players from Bournabat FC, half of whom were members of the Whittall family: Edward and his older brothers Albert and Godfrey, along with two cousins, Herbert and Donald, with the latter also participating in the rowing event. Aged 17 years and 352 days, he was not only the youngest player in the team, but also the youngest of the tournament. At the Olympics, Smyrna were knocked-out in the semifinals by a Copenhagen XI (5–1), who went on claim gold, but the withdrawal of the Athens team during the final and their subsequent disqualification meant that Smyrna and Thessaloniki would face each other for second place on 25 April 1906, in which the Whittalls, who formed a powerful attacking quintet, played a crucial role in helping their side to a 12–0 victory, thus winning the silver medal, which still is the greatest success of Izmir football in official matches.

== Later life and death ==
Whittall married Dorothy Jane Peacock, with whom he had seven children, Iris Eveline (1914–2005), Dulcie Mary (1915–1917), Dorothy Marion (1917–2012), Monica Daisy (1918–1998), Edward James (1921–), Joan (1923), and Rosemary (1924). In June 1946, Whittall and his wife returned to England, where he died at Uxbridge on 13 June 1947, at the age of 59, thus becoming the first of the three Whittall brothers to pass away.

== Honours ==
Smyrna XI

- Intercalated Games
  - Silver medalists (1): 1906 (representing Smyrna XI)
