= Heerup =

Heerup is a Danish surname. Notable people with the surname include:

- Henry Heerup (1907–1993), Danish painter, graphic artist, and sculptor
- Hjalmar Heerup (1886–1961), Danish footballer
- Ole Heerup (1934–2016), Danish visual artist
- Gunnar Heerup (1903–1989), Danish music educator and music researcher
- Malene Heerup (born 1964), Danish visual artist
