= Spyros Rigos =

Greek judoka

Spyros Rigos (born October 4, 1963 in Athens) is a 7th dan Greek judoka who represented Greece in international competition, and was the head coach of the national judo team from 1998 to 2000. Rigos shares with Yiannis Tsaparas the record of having the greatest number of Greek national titles in his weight division.

== Athletic career ==
Rigos started judo at Panellinios G.S. in 1975 and transferred to Ethnikos G.S. Athens in 1993. In 1980, Rigas visited Japan for the first time and obtained his first Dan from the Kodokan Judo Institute, making him the youngest person of Greek descent to do so, and winning all five of his fights by ippon. It was at this time that he placed himself under the guidance of Hiroyuki Hasegawa, 9th Dan and former all-Japan champion. During extended periods of stay in Japan, Rigos practiced judo at Tsukuba University, the Kodokan Ιnstitute, Tokai University, Saitama University and the Saitama Kidotai Police Centre. He later returned to these institutions as an assistant judo instructor. Rigos rose through the ranks at the Κodokan Institute, reaching the rank of 6th dan in 2011, making him a Kodokan shihan. In 2024 he was promoted to 7th by and at the Kodokan Institute, making him one of the few non-Japanese persons to have ever received the honour. His international career includes representing Greece at the Balkan Athletics Championships, the Mediterranean Games and the World Masters Championships. Rigos won 9 gold medals in the Greek championships, and 6 gold medals in the Greek Interclub Championships. Rigos is the holder of the greatest number of Greek national titles in his weight division, with consecutive wins in the 86 kg weight class from 1984 to 1986 and again from 1988 to 1990.

| Competition | Weight | Result |
|---|---|---|
| Balkan Youth Championships 1982 | under-86 kg | bronze |
| Balkan Championships 1986 | under-86 kg | silver |
| Mediterranean Games 1987 | under-86 kg | 5th place |
| Saitama Prefecture Team Championships 1989 | - | gold |
| European championships 1991 | under-86 kg | 9th place |
| World Masters Championships 2009 | over-100 kg, (M4 age band,45–49 years old) | gold |
| World Masters Championships 2010 | over-100 kg, (M4 age band, 45–49 years old) | 5th place |
| World Masters Championships 2011 | under-100 kg, (M4 age band, 45–49 years old) | 5th place |
| World Veterans Championships 2013 | under-100 kg, (M5 age band, 50–54 years old) | silver |

== Coaching career ==
Since 1984, Rigos has been the technical director and principal coach of Ethnikos G.S. During his term as head coach of the Greece national team from 1998 to 2000, Rigos introduced innovative training methods in an attempt to recover the “lost ground.” Already as an active contestant he had identified “the lack of combative opponents” as a fundamental problem in Greek contest judo. He also associated himself with the Judo Club of the University of Athens. Rigos is a founding member and is currently serving as vice-chair of the Greek Judo Veterans Association. In an article published in the Japanese newspaper Tokyo Shimbun, Rigos registered a major aspect of his training philosophy: “The soul of judo is only now coming to the fore. Victory or defeat is not that important." In a 2017 interview for Kathimerini newspaper, Rigos emphasized the general applicability of the two major judo principles of the correct use of energy and prosperity, reasoning that the “Japanese have attained a high level of education and culture through these principles.”
