= 1901–02 Football Tournament =

Football Tournament
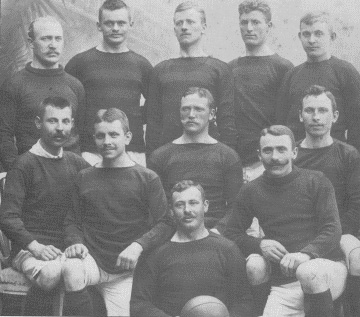
- Ballklubben Frem's championship team
- Season: 1901–02
- Matches played: 20
- Top goalscorer: Victor Vilager Andersen, Frem (10 goals); Johannes Gandil, B.93 (10 goals)

Statistics of the Football Tournament in the 1901–02 season.

== Overview ==
It was contested by 5 teams. Boldklubben Frem, the workers' club from the Copenhagen district Valby, won the DBU championship for the first time by overcoming defending champions and local rivals Boldklubben af 1893. The winning side included Stefan Rasmussen, Axel Andersen Byrval, and Louis Østrup, as well as the brothers Otto and Victor Andersen, who later changed their surname to Vilager. Since Copenhagen now had two decent pitches, this season, the 1901–02 season was thus the first one with two league matches played simultaneously.

== League standings ==
Pos	Team	Pld	W	D	L	GF	GA	GR	Pts
1	Boldklubben Frem	8	7	0	1	25	14	1.786	14
2	Boldklubben af 1893	8	6	0	2	25	15	1.667	12
3	Kjøbenhavns Boldklub	8	4	0	4	15	17	0.882	8
4	Akademisk Boldklub	8	2	0	6	13	18	0.722	4
5	Østerbros BK	8	1	0	7	11	25	0.440	2

== The champion team ==
Frems mesterhold
Position	Spiller
Målmand	Holger Nielsen
Forsvar	Peter Mikkelsen; Christian Henriksen
Midtbane	Valdemar Petersen; Axel Andersen Byrval; Otto Andersen
Angreb	Peter Møller; Victor Vilager Andersen; Carl Mertins; Stefan Rasmussen; August Møller-Sørensen
Reserver	Christian Hansen; Louis Østrup; Edvin Gielfeldt; Georg Gielfeldt; C. Wegener
