= Henry Rambusch =

Danish footballer (1881–1954)

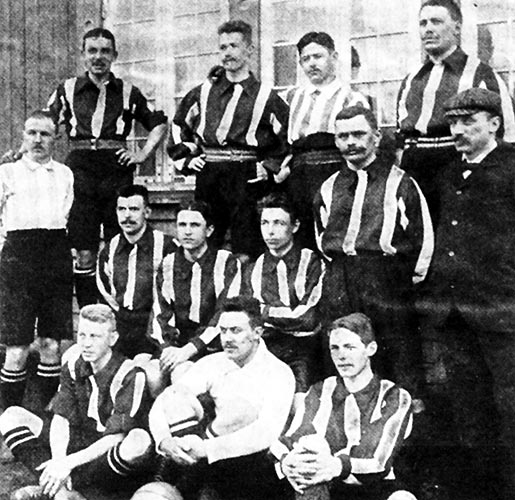
- Rambusch with the Copenhagen city selection in 1906

Personal information
- Full name: Henry Andreas Rambusch
- Date of birth: 16 October 1881
- Place of birth: Aarhus, Denmark
- Date of death: 20 May 1954 (aged 72)
- Place of death: Copenhagen, Denmark
- Position: Forward

Youth career
- 1894–1897: Østerbros Boldklub

Senior career*
Years	Team	Apps	(Gls)
1897–1909	Boldklubben af 1893		
1902–1903	Berliner SV 1892		
1903–1909	Boldklubben af 1893		

International career
1906	Denmark	2	(+0)
Medal record
Men's football
Representing Denmark
Football at the Summer Olympics
Gold medal – first place	1906 Athens	Team competition
- * Club domestic league appearances and goals

Henry Andreas Rambusch (16 October 1881 – 20 May 1954) was a Danish footballer who played as a forward for Boldklubben af 1893 at the start of the 20th century. He competed in the football tournament at the 1906 Intercalated Games in Athens, winning a gold medal as a member of the Denmark team.

== Early life and education ==
Henry Rambusch was born in Aarhus on 16 October 1881, as the son of Holger Rambusch, a machinist. After completing his studies in engineering, he became an artillery officer, being appointed second lieutenant in 1905.

== Playing career ==
In 1894, the 13-year-old Rambusch began his football career at Østerbros Boldklub, from which he joined B93 in 1897. An fast and dangerous left winger who was noted for his powerful left-footed shots, Rambusch scored a total of 34 goals in 56 matches for the club's first team between 1898 and 1909. In 1902, he was a member of the club's first-ever trip abroad to Hungary and Bohemia, helping his side claim a victory in all five matches played. Outside football, he was an engineer, a work that took him to Berlin in 1901–02, where he played for Berliner SV 1892.

In April 1906, Rambusch was a member of the first-ever version of a Denmark national team, which participated in the football tournament of the 1906 Intercalated Games in Athens, helping his side win an unofficial gold medal after beating the hosts Athens XI in the final 9–0. The team that represented Denmark was made up of players from the Copenhagen Football Association (DBU), with Rambusch being one of the six players from B93.

== Later life ==
Rambusch was a member of the club's board for a year and later presided over the club's junior football department. He later served as a telegraph master in the navy. He was also a Knight of the Order of the Dannebrog.

== Death ==
Rambusch died in Copenhagen on 20 May 1954, at the age of 72.

== Honours ==
Denmark

- Intercalated Games
  - Gold medalists (1): 1906
