= 1906–07 Ethnikos G.S. Athens season =

Ethnikos G.S. Athens
1906-07 season
- Stadium: Neo Phaliron Velodrome
- Panhellenic Championship: 1st

1905-06 was Ethnikos' second season of organised football, competing in the second Panhellenic Championship, in which the club came first.

== Panhellenic Championship ==
February 18, 1907 Semi-final	Ethnikos	2–1	Peiraikos	Piraeus
		Report (Page 2, Greek)		Stadium: Neo Phaliron Velodrome; Referee: Campbell

February 25, 1907 Final	Ethnikos	2–1	Akadimaikon Gimnastirion	Piraeus
		Report (Page 2, Greek)		Stadium: Neo Phaliron Velodrome

== All Matches ==
Date	Opponents	H / A	Result F–A
February 18, 1907	Peiraikos	H	2-1
February 25, 1907	Akadimaikon Gimnastirion	H	2-1

== Squad ==
N	Pos.	Nat.	Name	Age	EU	Since	App	Goals	Ends	Transfer fee	Notes
	GK	(Greece)	A. Laskaris (C)		EU		2				
	FB	(Greece)	N. Lorandos		EU		1				
	FB	(Greece)	A. Konstantaras		EU		1				
	FB	(Greece)	D. Konstantaras		EU		1				Also FW
	FB	(Greece)	K. Vrizakis		EU		2				Also FW
	MF	(Greece)	I. Zeppos		EU		2				
	MF	(Greece)	K. Goulimis		EU		2				
	MF	(Greece)	A. Lamprinidis		EU		2				
	MF	(Greece)	P. Melas		EU		2				Also FW
	FW	(Greece)	S. Kountouriotis		EU		2				
	FW	(Greece)	A. Leon		EU		2				
	FW	(Greece)	K. Volidis		EU		1				
	FW	(Greece)	P. Iraios		EU		1				

- Source: See References
