= Stefan Rasmussen =

Stefan Rasmussen may refer to:

- Stefan Rasmussen (footballer) (1880–1951), Danish footballer
- Stefan G. Rasmussen (born 1947), Danish airline pilot
