= Aage Andersen =

Danish footballer (1883–1976)

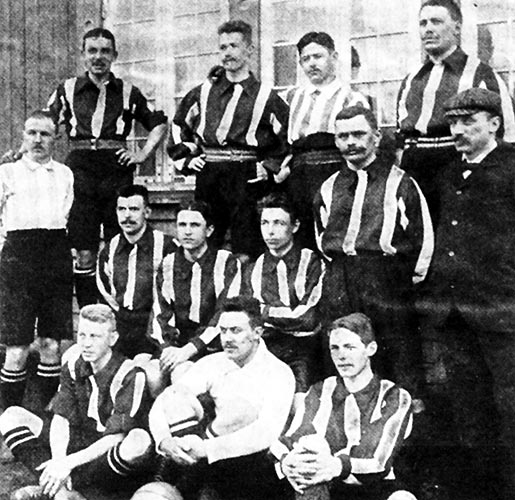
- Andersen with the Copenhagen city selection in 1906

Personal information
- Full name: Aage Jørgen Christian Andersen
- Date of birth: 1 December 1883
- Place of birth: Copenhagen, Denmark
- Date of death: 1 April 1976 (aged 92)
- Place of death: Pinner, Greater London, England
- Position: Midfielder

Senior career*
Years	Team	Apps	(Gls)
?–1906	Akademisk Boldklub		
1907–1908	Wacker Leipzig		

International career
1906	Denmark	2	(+0)
Medal record
Men's football
Representing Denmark
Football at the Summer Olympics
Gold medal – first place	1906 Athens	Team competition
- * Club domestic league appearances and goals

Aage Jørgen Christian Andersen (1 December 1883 – 1 April 1976) was a Danish footballer who played as a midfielder for Akademisk Boldklub and Wacker Leipzig at the start of the 20th century. He also competed in the football tournament of the 1906 Intercalated Games in Athens, winning a gold medal as a member of the Denmark team.

== Playing career ==
Born in Copenhagen on 1 December 1883, Aage Andersen was playing at his hometown club Akademisk Boldklub when he was called-up by the Copenhagen Football Association (DBU), together with five of his teammates, to represent Denmark in the football tournament of the 1906 Intercalated Games in Athens, where he helped his side win an unofficial gold medal, beating the hosts Athens XI in the final 9–0.

In the following year, in 1907, Andersen joined the ranks of Wacker Leipzig, then a top-flight club in Germany, helping his side win the 1908 Central German football championship, beating Victoria 96 Magdeburg 3–2 in the final, thus qualifying for the 1908 German football championship, where he played two matches, the quarter-final and semifinal, which ended in a 4–0 loss to the eventual champions Viktoria 89 Berlin.

== Later life and death ==
In his later years, Andersen wrote some books, including Refining of oils and fats for edible purposes in 1962 and Margarine in 1965.

Andersen died in Pinner, Greater London, on 1 April 1976, at the age of 92.

== Honours ==
=== Club ===
Wacker Leipzig

- Central German football championship
  - Champions (1): 1908

=== International ===
Denmark

- Intercalated Games
  - Gold medalists (1): 1906

== Works ==
- Margarine (1965)
- Refining of oils and fats for edible purposes (1962)
