= Gunson =

Gunson is a surname. Notable people with the surname include:

- Ella Gunson (born 1989), New Zealand field hockey player
- Gordon Gunson (1904–1991), English footballer
- James Gunson (1877–1963), New Zealand businessman and politician
- Joe Gunson (1863–1942), American baseball player
- Lyn Gunson (born 1953), netball player and coach from New Zealand
