= Hjalmar Heerup =

Danish footballer (1886–1961)

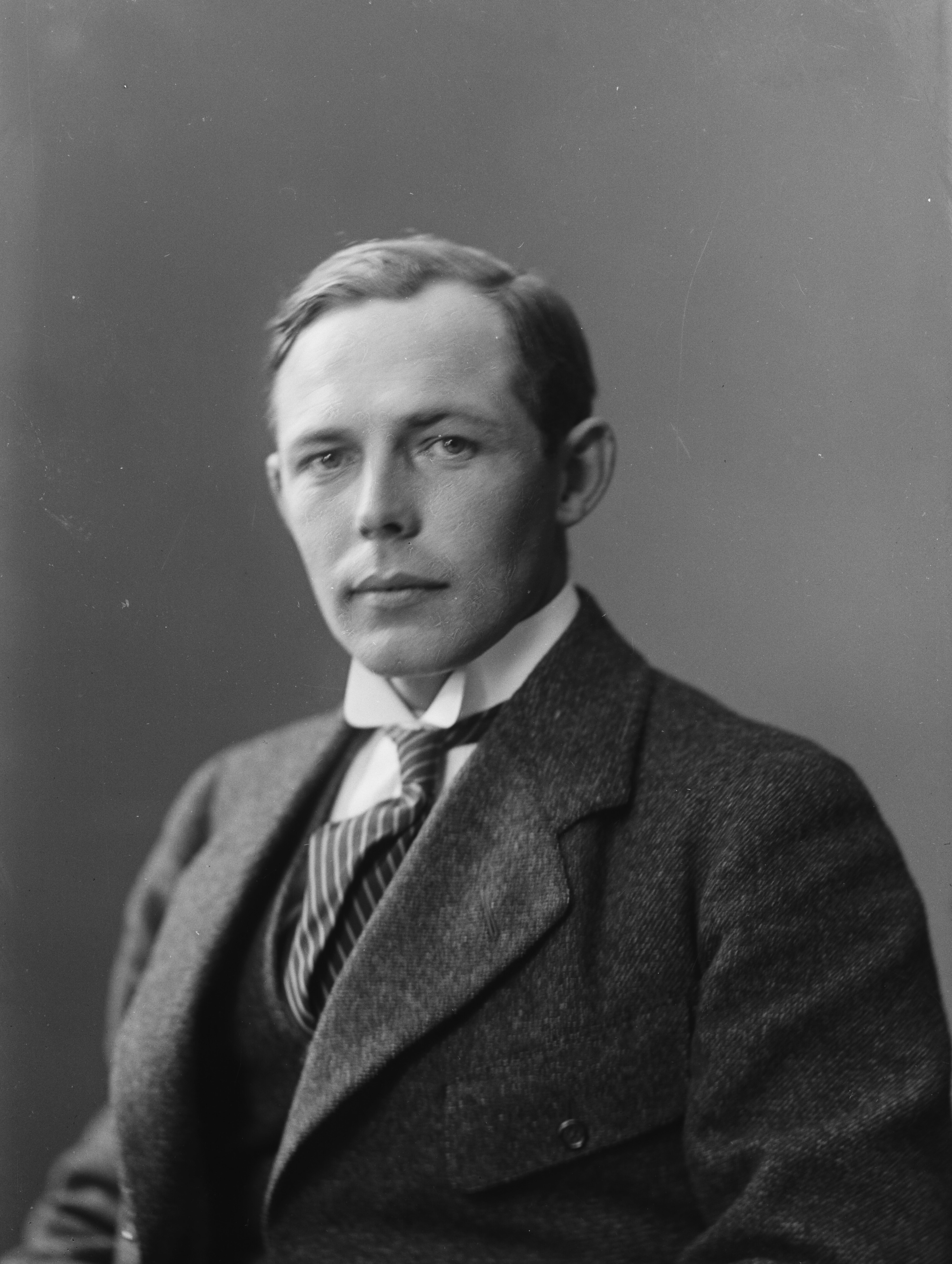
- Heerup in June 1916

Personal information
- Date of birth: 14 April 1886
- Place of birth: Frederiksværk, Denmark
- Date of death: 18 November 1961 (aged 75)
- Place of death: Odense, Denmark
- Position: Defender

Senior career*
Years	Team	Apps	(Gls)
1904–1906	Akademisk Boldklub		

International career
1906	Denmark	2	(+0)
Medal record
Men's football
Representing Denmark
Football at the Summer Olympics
Gold medal – first place	1906 Athens	Team competition
- * Club domestic league appearances and goals

Hjalmar Heerup (14 April 1886 – 18 November 1961) was a Danish footballer who played as a defender for Akademisk Boldklub at the start of the 20th century. He competed in the football tournament at the 1906 Intercalated Games in Athens, winning a gold medal as a member of the Denmark team.

== Playing career ==
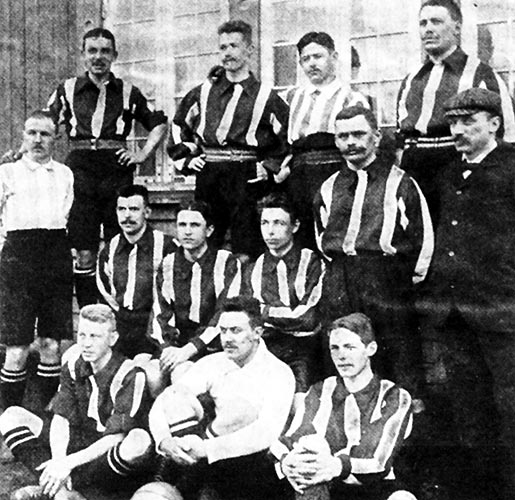
Heerup with the Copenhagen city selection in 1906.

Born in Frederiksværk on 14 April 1886, Heerup was playing for Akademisk Boldklub when he was called up by the Copenhagen Football Association (DBU), together with five of his teammates, to represent Denmark in the football tournament of the 1906 Intercalated Games in Athens, where he helped his side win an unofficial gold medal, beating the hosts Athens XI in the final 9–0.

== Later life ==
Having completed his studies in medicine at the University of Copenhagen, Heerup became a doctor and chief physician, working as a medical officer in the Faroe Islands from 1915 until 1930. During his stint there, he was elected as a member and deputy mayor of the municipal council of Tórshavn Municipality, a position that he held from early 1929 until his resignation on 9 July 1930. After returning to Denmark, he settled at Albanigade, serving as a county doctor in Odense from 1930 to 1956.

== Death ==
Heerup died in Odense on 18 November 1961, at the age of 75.

== Honours ==
Denmark

- Intercalated Games
  - Gold medalists (1): 1906
