= Bornova Anglican Cemetery =

British cemetery in Bornova, İzmir, Turkey

- Interactive map of Bornova Anglican Cemetery

Details
- Established: 1875
- Location: Bornova, İzmir
- Country: Turkey
- Coordinates: 38°27′34″N 27°12′38″E
- Type: Anglican cemetery
- Style: 19th century European
- Find a Grave: Bornova Anglican Cemetery

Bornova Anglican Cemetery (Turkish: Bornova Anglikan Mezarlığı) also known as The English Churchyard of St. Mary Magdalene is a historic English Protestant cemetery in İzmir, Turkey. The cemetery is approximately 6 kilometres north of the city centre in a district called Bornova.

== History and description ==
The cemetery was consecrated by the Bishop of Gibraltar on May 3, 1875. It is in a built up area with apartment blocks overlooking. The red painted front wall and white cross should easily be viewed from the main road. This civil cemetery contains three Commonwealth burials of the Second World War. The burial ground is still used as cemetery and accepting new burials, there are however criteria concerning burial here, linking the person to Bornova usually. Unlike virtually all other cemeteries of any denomination, this burial ground is still under private ownership allowing the management to be affected by its own cemetery council with the council only being in charge of tree pruning. Unfortunately the graveyard has suffered considerable desecration in the 1980s and 90s, now halted with a resident guard.

Merchant and botanist Edward Whittall (1851–1917) is buried here.

== See also ==
- St. John the Evangelist's Anglican Church, İzmir
