= Herbert Whittall (footballer, born 1884) =

Anglo-Ottoman footballer (1884–1953)

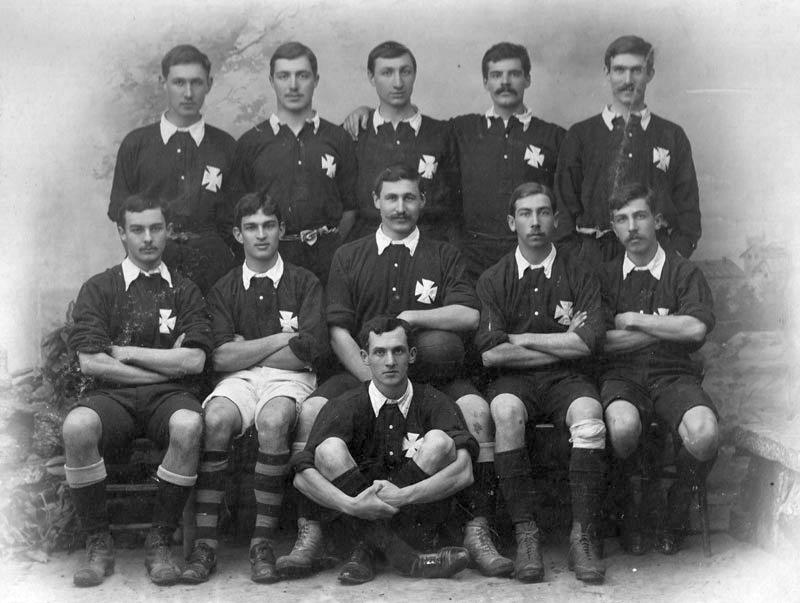
- Whittall (standing, first from right) in 1906

Personal information
- Full name: Herbert James Whittall
- Date of birth: 1884
- Place of birth: İzmir, Ottoman Empire
- Date of death: 22 March 1953 (aged 69)
- Place of death: İzmir, Ottoman Empire
- Position: Forward

Senior career*
Years	Team	Apps	(Gls)
1904–1906	Bournabat FC		

International career
1906	Smyrna XI	2	(+0)
Medal record
Men's football
Representing Turkey
Football at the Summer Olympics
Silver medal – second place	1906 Athens	Team competition
- * Club domestic league appearances and goals

Herbert James Whittall (1884 – 22 March 1953) was an Anglo-Ottoman footballer who played as a forward for Bournabat FC and was one of five members of the Whittall family who competed in the football tournament at the 1906 Intercalated Games in Athens, winning a silver medal as a member of the Bournabat Olympic team representing Smyrna.

== Early life and education ==
Herbert Whittall was born in İzmir in 1884, as the third of five children from the marriage formed by Louisa Jane Maltass and Herbert Whittall, one of the grandsons of the family's founder, the Liverpool-born Charlton Whittall (1791–1867), who worked for a trading company in his hometown, which sent him to Smyrna (now İzmir), a major sea port, where he later set up his own trading company named C. Whittall & Co. This firm exported Turkish products to England, and was thus later absorbed by the Levant Company, a trading company that controlled and regulated trade between England and Turkey.

As the son of a well-off family, Whittall was sent to England to complete his education at Cheltenham College, where he excelled at music and athletics, most notably the shot put.

== Playing career ==
Whittall began playing football at Bournabat FC, which had been founded in Bornova in the late 1880s by several young merchants from the vast colony of Westerners living in Levant, specifically of British and French nationality, such as prominent members of the wealthy Whithall and La Fontaine families residing in Izmir; in Bournabat's first-ever recorded match in 1894, the club fielded several members of those families, including his father Herbert, who played a crucial role in helping Bournabat became the strongest team in Smyrna in the 1890s.

In the early 20th century, Smyrna had the best football in the Ottoman Empire, hence why the Greeks invited a team from that region to participate in the 1906 Intercalated Games in Athens. The team that represented Smyrna at the Olympics was entirely composed of players from Bournabat FC, half of whom were members of the Whittall family: Herbert, and his cousins Albert, Godfrey, Edward, and Donald, with the latter also participating in the rowing event. At the Olympics, Smyrna were knocked-out in the semifinals by a Copenhagen XI (5–1), who went on claim gold, but the withdrawal of the Athens team during the final and their subsequent disqualification meant that Smyrna and Thessaloniki would face each other for second place on 25 April 1906, in which the Whittalls, who formed a powerful attacking quintet, played a crucial role in helping their side to a 12–0 victory, thus winning the silver medal, which still is the greatest success of Izmir football in official matches.

== Death ==
On 22 March 1953, the 69-year-old Whittall died during a hunting trip when his Jeep was hit on an unmarked level crossing by a train. He had three children, Douglas George (1909–?), Herbert Alfred (1914–?), and Victor.

== Honours ==
Smyrna XI

- Intercalated Games
  - Silver medalists (1): 1906 (representing Smyrna XI)
