= 1907 SEGAS Championship =

2nd season of SEGAS Championship

SEGAS Championship
- Season: 1907
- Champions: Ethnikos G.S. Athens
- Matches: 4
- Goals: 8 (2 per match)

The 1907 SEGAS Championship was the second championship organized by SEGAS and the Hellenic Olympic Committee.

== Overview ==
The competition was held in a cup-like format. All 3 matches took place at the Neo Phaliron Velodrome. Ethnikos G.S. Athens won the championship, after beating Akadimaikon Gimnastirion by 2–1 in the final. Note that Akadimaikon Gimnastirion was the football team of the University of Athens. The other 3 contestants were the same with the previous season.

== Teams ==
As with last year all teams came from Athens and Piraeus.

=== Matches ===
11 February 1907
15:00
Semi-final

Akadimaikon Gimnastirion	2–0	Panellinios
	Report (Page 4, Greek)

Neo Phaliron Velodrome

18 February 1907
15:00
Semi-final

Ethnikos G.S. Athens	2–1	Peiraikos Syndesmos
	Report (Page 2, Greek)

Neo Phaliron Velodrome
Referee: Campbell

25 February 1907
15:00
Final

Ethnikos G.S. Athens	2–1	Akadimaikon Gimnastirion
	Report (Page 2, Greek)

Neo Phaliron Velodrome
