= 1905–06 Ethnikos G.S. Athens season =

Ethnikos G.S. Athens
1905-06 season
- Stadium: Neo Phaliron Velodrome
- Panhellenic Championship: 1st

1905-06 was Ethnikos' first season of organised football, competing in the very first Panhellenic Championship, in which the club came first.

== Friendlies ==
March 1906	Ethnikos	7-0	Peiraikos	Piraeus
				Stadium: Neo Phaliron Velodrome

March 1906	Ethnikos B	0-2	Peiraikos	Piraeus
				Stadium: Neo Phaliron Velodrome

16 April 1906	Ethnikos	0-18	British Marines	Piraeus
		Report (Page 4, Greek)		Stadium: Neo Phaliron Velodrome

== Panhellenic Championship ==
March 1906 Match 1	Ethnikos	3-0	Peiraikos	Piraeus
		RSSSF		Stadium: Neo Phaliron Velodrome

April 1906 Match 3	Ethnikos	3-0	Panellinios	Piraeus
		RSSSF		Stadium: Neo Phaliron Velodrome

Pos	Team	Pld	W	D	L	GF	GA	GD	Pts	ETH	PIR	PAN
1	Ethnikos G.S. Athens (C)	2	2	0	0	6	0	+6	4		3–0	3–0
2	Peiraikos Syndesmos	2	1	0	1	4	6	−2	2	—		4–3
3	Panellinios	2	0	0	2	3	7	−4	0	—	—	

Source: RSSSF
Rules for classification: 1) points; 2) goal difference; 3) number of goals scored.
(C) Champions

== Intercalated Games ==
23 April 1906 Semi-Final	Ethnikos	5-0	Omilos Filomouson	Piraeus
		Report		Stadium: Neo Phaliron Velodrome

24 April 1906 Final	Ethnikos	0-9	Denmark	Piraeus
		Report		Stadium: Neo Phaliron Velodrome
Note: Ethnikos forfeited at half-time and were subsequently disqualified from the tournament.

== All matches ==
Date	Opponents	H / A	Result F–A	Notes
March 1906	Peiraikos	H	7-0	
March 1906	Peiraikos	H	0-2 (B Team)	
March 1906	Peiraikos	H	3-0	
April 1906	Panellinios	H	3-0	
16 April 1906	British Marines	H	0-18	
23 April 1906	Omilos Filomouson	H	5-0	
23 April 1906	Denmark	H	0-9	Forfeited at half-time.

== Squad ==
N	Pos.	Nat.	Name	Age	EU	Since	App	Goals	Ends	Transfer fee	Notes
	GK	(Greece)	Panagiotis Vrionis		EU	1905	3		1906		
	FB	(Greece)	Georgios Gerontakis		EU		3				
	FB	(Greece)	Alexandros Dragoumis		EU		1				
	FB	(Greece)	Nikolaos Dekavalas		EU		2				
	MF	(Greece)	Omiros Iosifoglou		EU	1905	3				
	MF	(Greece)	Alexandros Kalafatis		EU	1905	3				
	MF	(Greece)	Konstantinos Botasis		EU		3				
	FW	(Greece)	Panagiotis Botasis		EU		3				
	FW	(Greece)	Grigoris Vrionis		EU		3				
	FW	(Greece)	Georgios Pantos		EU		3				
	FW	(Greece)	Theodoros Nikolaidis		EU		1				
	FW	(Greece)	Nellis		EU		1				
	FW	(Greece)	Georgios Merkouris		EU		2				
	FW	(Greece)	Konstantinos Syriotis		EU		2				
		(Greece)	Filiakos		EU		1				

- Source: Greek Wikipedia

Appearances and goals include the Panhellenic Championship, Olympic Games and friendly matches, of which statistics are known.
