= Donald Whittall =

Anglo-Ottoman footballer (1881–1959)

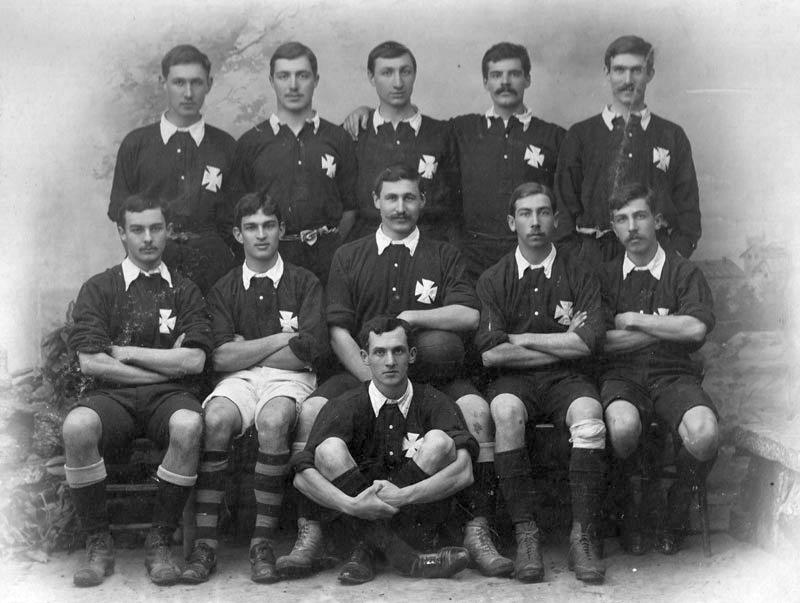
- Whittall (standing, second from right) in 1906

Personal information
- Date of birth: 25 February 1881
- Place of birth: İzmir, Ottoman Empire
- Date of death: 20 October 1959 (aged 78)
- Place of death: İzmir, Ottoman Empire
- Position: Forward

Senior career*
Years	Team	Apps	(Gls)
1904–1906	Bournabat FC		

International career
1906	Smyrna XI	2	(+0)
Medal record
Men's football
Representing Turkey
Football at the Summer Olympics
Silver medal – second place	1906 Athens	Team competition
- * Club domestic league appearances and goals

Donald Whittall (25 February 1881 – 20 October 1959) was an Anglo-Ottoman footballer who played as a forward for Bournabat FC and was one of five members of the Whittall family who competed in the football tournament at the 1906 Intercalated Games in Athens, winning a silver medal as a member of the Bournabat Olympic team representing Smyrna.

== Early life ==
Donald Whittall was born in İzmir on 25 February 1881, as the son of Sophia Maria Cramer (1847–1948) and Richard Whittall, one of the grandsons of the family's founder, the Liverpool-born Charlton Whittall (1791–1867), who worked for a trading company in his hometown, which sent him to Smyrna (now İzmir), a major sea port, where he later set up his own trading company named C. Whittall & Co. This firm exported Turkish products to England, and was thus later absorbed by the Levant Company, a trading company that controlled and regulated trade between England and Turkey. Notably, his father was the one who brought the first motor vehicle into Turkey in 1905.

== Playing career ==
Whittall began playing football at Bournabat FC, which had been founded in Bornova in the late 1880s by several young merchants from the vast colony of Westerners living in Levant, specifically of British and French nationality, such as prominent members of the wealthy Whithall and La Fontaine families residing in Izmir; in fact, in Bournabat's first-ever recorded match in 1894, the club fielded several members of those families, including his uncle Herbert, who played a crucial role in helping Bournabat became the strongest team in Smyrna in the 1890s.

In the early 20th century, Smyrna had the best football in the Ottoman Empire, hence why the Greeks invited a team from that region to participate in the 1906 Intercalated Games in Athens. The team that represented Smyrna at the Olympics was entirely composed of players from Bournabat FC, half of whom were members of the Whittall family: Donald, and his cousins Albert, Godfrey, Edward, and Herbert. At the Olympics, Smyrna were knocked-out in the semifinals by a Copenhagen XI (5–1), who went on claim gold, but the withdrawal of the Athens team during the final and their subsequent disqualification meant that Smyrna and Thessaloniki would face each other for second place on 25 April 1906, in which the Whittalls, who formed a powerful attacking quintet, played a crucial role in helping their side to a 12–0 victory, thus winning the silver medal, which still is the greatest success of Izmir football in official matches.

Donald was the only Whittall to compete in another sport at the 1906 Games, as he also participated in the coxed fours rowing event, where his four crewmates were all Greek; they finished seventh out of eight.

== Death ==
Whittall died on 20 October 1959, at the age of 78, thus being the last surviving member of the five Whitalls who participated at the 1906 Games.

== Honours ==
Smyrna XI

- Intercalated Games
  - Silver medalists (1): 1906 (representing Smyrna XI)
