= Vasilios Zarkadis =

Greek fencer and footballer

Sport
- Sport: Fencing, football
Medal record
Football
Representing Greece
Olympic Games
Bronze medal – third place	1906	Football

Vasilios Zarkadis (Greek: Βασίλιος Ζαρκάδης) was a Greek fencer and footballer. He won a bronze medal in football as part of the Greek team at the 1906 Intercalated Games.
