= Ludvig Sylow (DBU) =

Danish football executive (1861–1933)

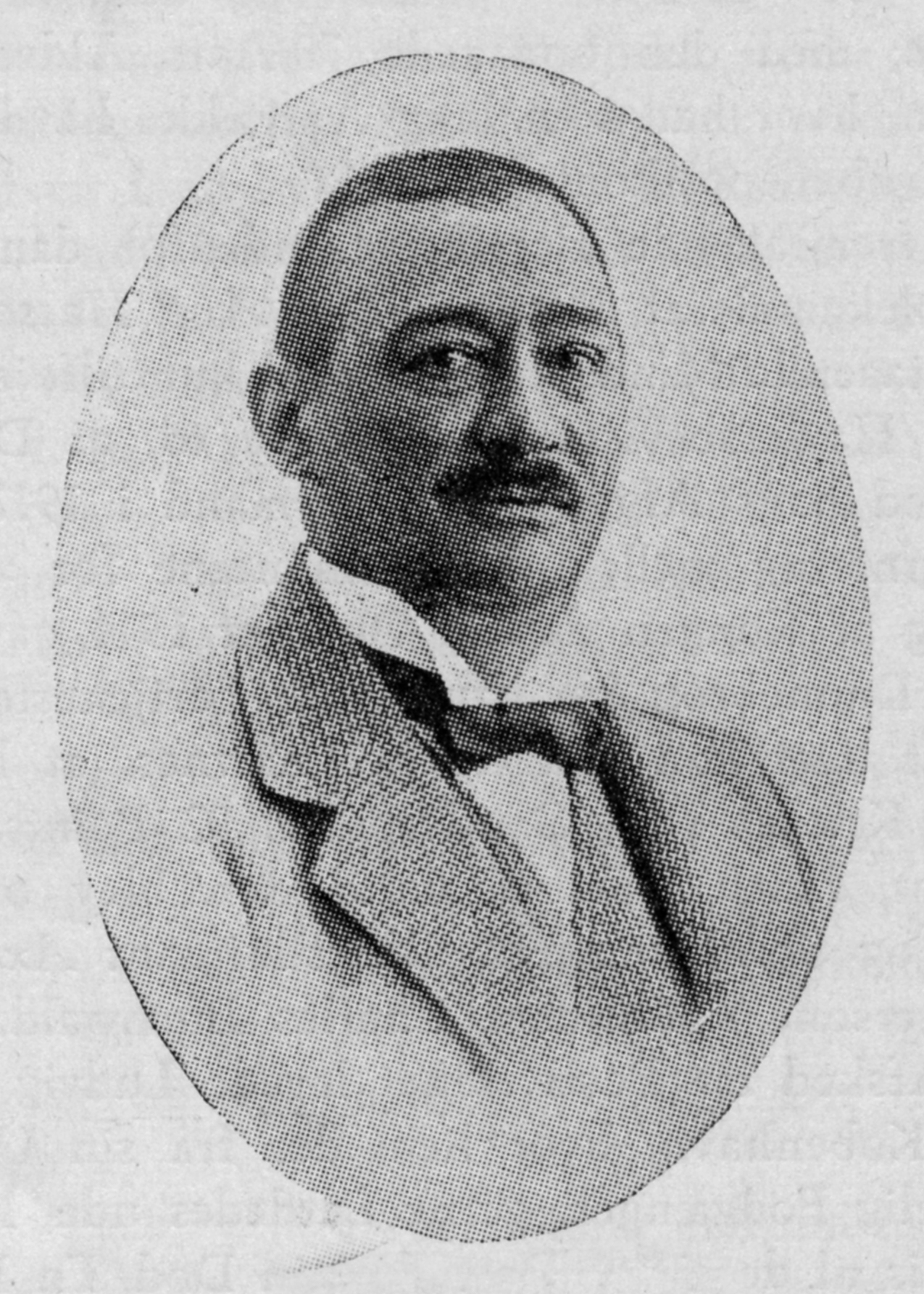
- Ludvig Sylow

5th President of Danish Football Association
- In office 1911–1918
- Preceded by: Albert Albertsen
- Succeeded by: Louis Østrup

Personal details
- Born: 6 October 1861 Copenhagen, Denmark
- Died: 20 February 1933 (aged 71) Vejle, Denmark
- Citizenship: Danish
- Occupation: Football executive

Ludvig Sylow (6 October 1861 – 20 February 1933) was a Danish football executive, who was the fifth chairman of the Danish Football Association from 1911 to 1918. He was also a member of FIFA's founding board of directors.

== Early life ==
Ludvig Sylow was born on 6 October 1861 as the son of a mayor. After a brief stint at the Korsør Realskole, Sylow attended the Sorø Academy in 1877, where he helped to introduce football in 1878. Later that year, he graduated after taking a maths and science exam and was then employed by the Post and Telegraph Service. As a result of this, Sylow was moved to Copenhagen and advanced to mailroom clerk in 1886, and became a post inspector in 1914. Shortly after he moved to Copenhagen in 1879, Sylow became associated with Kjøbenhavns Boldklub (KB), for whom he played several first-team matches in football, tennis, cricket, and was the captain of KB's cricket match team for many years.

== Sports career ==
Over time he became heavily involved in the organizational work at the club, and in the mid-1880s, when KB took the initiative to look at the different forms of football and their laws, Sylow was one of its main promoters. In 1886, Sylow, together with Frederik Markmann, Holger Forchhammer, and E. Wescher, translated the English association rules into Danish, so from then on rules such as offside and "hand on the ball" were used in Danish football. These rules were first used in a match the following year, in 1887. Prior to this, the matches would be played with a mixture of rugby and football rules, so this translation was a big step in the development of football in Denmark.

Sylow was the chairman of KB twice, first in 1887, but his stint only lasted a year, and then he was elected chairman again in 1901 and this time he sat in the post for five years. In 1904, Sylow was the Danish representative in the assembly that founded the world organization Fédération Internationale de Football Association (FIFA), where he was elected the assistant of FIFA's first-ever General Secretary Louis Muhlinghaus.

In 1911 he ran for the presidential election in the Danish Football Union (DBU) and won, replacing Albert Albertsen as chairman of the country's football association, sat in the post until 1918, and was replaced by Louis Østrup. Sylow bequeathed all his earthly possessions to KB. In 1914 was appointed Knight of the Dannebrog.

== Death ==
Sylow died in Vejle on 20 February 1933, at the age of 71.
