= Albert Albertsen =

Danish justice councillor and football executive

- Born: Albert Martin Albertsen; 20 May 1848; Ærøskøbing, Denmark
- Died: 9 January 1913 (aged 64); Frederiksberg, Denmark
- Citizenship: Danish
- Occupations: Barrister; Justice councillor; Football executive
- Known for: 4th President of Danish Football Association

4th President of Danish Football Association
- In office 1897 – 22 April 1911
- Preceded by: Johannes Forchhammer
- Succeeded by: Ludvig Sylow

Albert Martin Albertsen (20 May 1848 – 9 January 1913) was a Danish justice councillor and football executive, who served as the 4th chairman of the Danish Football Association for 14 years, from 1897 until 1911.

== Early life and education ==
Albert Albertsen was born on 20 May 1848 as the son of Peter Albertsen, a shipmaster, and Anne Sophie Lauritzen. After working in the County Hall of Ærø and Svendborg, he studied law, and upon his graduation in 1872, he became a barrister.

== Professional career ==
In that same year, Albertsen became a clerk at the Vallø stift foundation, where he worked for three years, until 1875, when he became an assistant in the General Fire Insurance of the Towns, where he advanced to clerk in 1878, to deputy director in 1886, and finally to director in 1906, a position that he held until his death.

Albertsen became chancellor in 1892, real justice in 1906, and a Knight of the Order of the Dannebrog on 11 January 1911. In 1906, he replaced State Councilor Julius Goldschmidt as the new auditor at Vallø Diocese, a position that he held for seven years, until 1913, when he was replaced by former mayor and city clerk Kai August Hammerich.

== Sporting career ==
A long-time member of Kjøbenhavns Boldklub (KB), Albertsen was elected as the fourth president of the Danish Football Association (DBU) in 1897, thus replacing Johannes Forchhammer. He held that position for 14 years, until 1911, when he was replaced by Ludvig Sylow.

== Personal life ==
On 26 October 1877, Albertsen married in the Church of Our Lady in Svendborg to Anna Elisabeth Christine Gregoria Henriette Kugler (1852–1925), the daughter of organist Frederik Vilhelm Kugler. He died in Frederiksberg on 9 January 1913, at the age of 64.
