= Lloyd's Agency Network =

- Company type: Survey Network
- Industry: Insurance
- Founded: 1811
- Headquarters: 1, Lime Street; London, United Kingdom
- Website: www.lloyds.com/market-resources/lloyds-agency-network

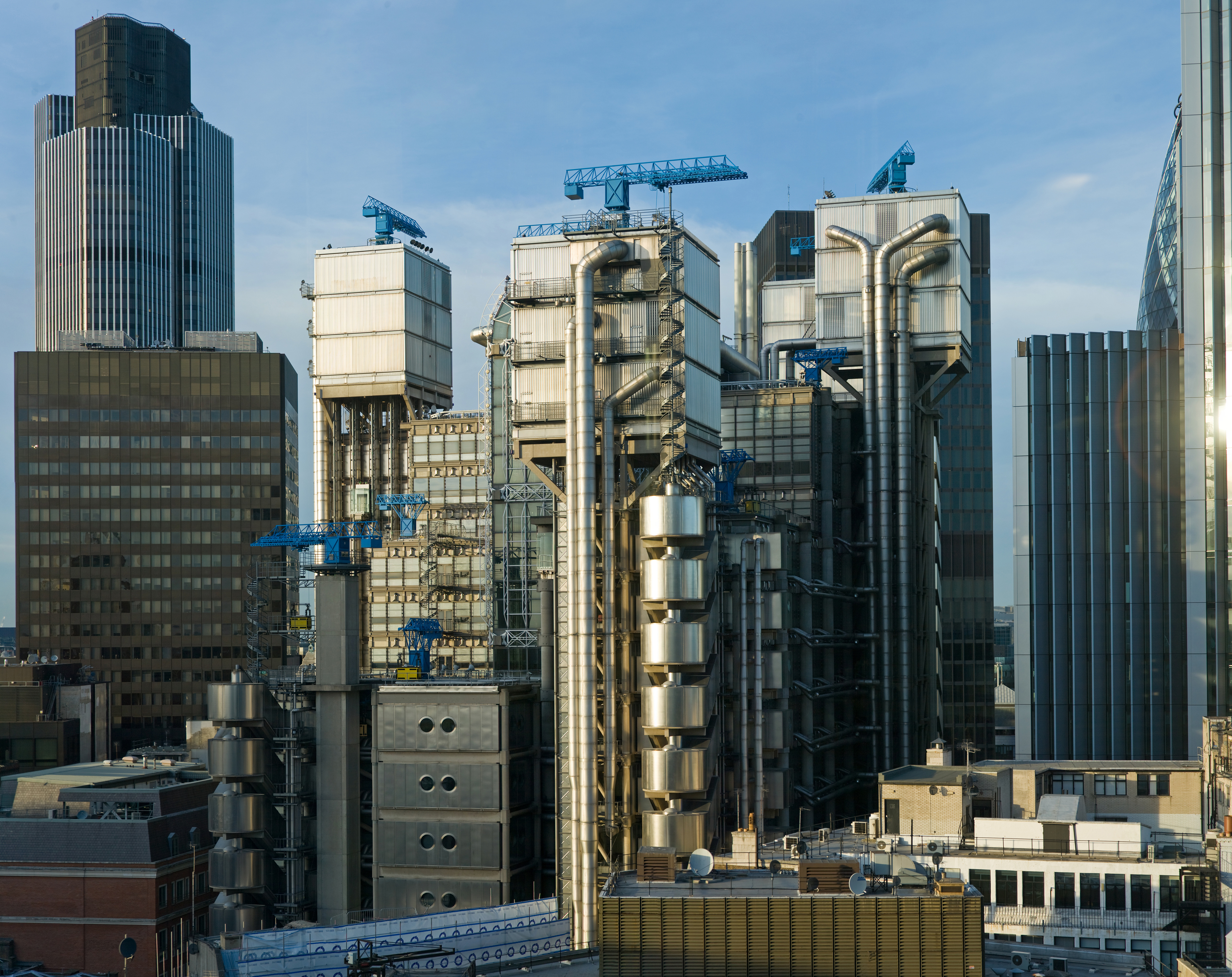
The Lloyd's building (centre), with Tower 42 in the top-left

The Lloyd's Agency Network was established in August 1811 by the then Committee of Lloyd's of London. They resolved that it is highly important to the interests of Underwriters, that a regular and universal system of intelligence and superintendence should be established in all the Principal Ports and Places, both at home and abroad..., and so the first Agents were appointed at Dover, Deal, Margate, Charleston, Antigua and Madeira.

The Agency Network developed quickly from its inception in 1811 and by the middle of the 19th century over three hundred Agents had been established worldwide. Today, the network comprises over 300 Lloyd’s Agents and a similar number of Sub Agents in every major port and commercial centre in the world. Their primary purpose is to provide a range of surveying and adjusting services to the global insurance market and its customers.
