= Louis Østrup =

Danish football executive (1876–1951)

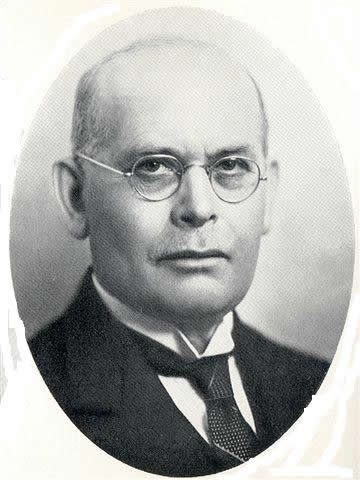
- Louis Østrup

6th President of Danish Football Association
- In office 25 February 1918 – 1935
- Preceded by: Ludvig Sylow
- Succeeded by: Kristian Middelboe
- Born: Louis Harald Østrup; 23 March 1876; Brumleby, Østerbro, Denmark
- Died: 12 December 1951 (aged 75); Hellerup, Denmark
- Resting place: Bispebjerg Cemetery
- Citizenship: Danish
- Occupations: Football executive; Consul General of Costa Rica
- Known for: 6th President of Danish Football Association

Louis Harald Østrup (23 March 1876 – 12 December 1951) was a Danish consul general and football executive, who was the sixth chairman of the Danish Football Association from 1918 to 1935.

== Official career ==
Østrup was associated with Boldklubben Frem all his life. As a 14-year-old, he became an official member of the club in 1890, and played cricket and football in Frem's youth teams. Three years later, as a 17-year-old, Østrup was elected as treasurer at the club's general meeting, after criticizing that many members failed to pay the club dues of 75 øre. He held this position for several years to come. Østrup helped the club win the local cricket tournament in 1894, for the first time in the club's history, after which they won the championship several times. In total, Østrup played 47 first-team matches in cricket. Moreover, he also played football in the club's first team, playing 23 matches between 1894 and 1900. He was at the 1901–02 Football Tournament as a reserve player, when they won the tournament for the first time.

In 1912, at the age of 36, Østrup was appointed as the coach of the Danish squad that competed in the football tournament of the 1912 Olympic Games in Stockholm. Denmark would go on to win silver after losing the final 2–4 to Great Britain.

Østrup became a member of the board of the Danish Football Association in 1911, and became its new vice-chairman later that same year, at the same time as Ludvig Sylow became the new chairman. At DBU's representative board meeting on 25 February 1918, Østrup was elected as the 6th chairman of the country's football association, thus replacing Sylow in the post. He held the presidency for 17 years, the longest-serving chairman in the history of the Danish association. His mandate ended in 1935 when he resigned from the union's board due to personal disagreements, being replaced by former Danish international Kristian Middelboe. Østrup also became vice-president of FIFA in 1921 and held this post until 1927.

== Civil Service ==
In 1914, Østrup took over as the Consul General for Costa Rica, and in 1927, he was appointed director of a trade agency. He received the Order of Vasa of the 1st degree, the Norwegian Football Federation's badge of honor in gold, the Netherlands Football Association's badge of honour, the Boldklubben Frem's gold pin in 1946, and was posthumously named an honorary member of the club in 2009.

== Personal life ==
Østrup was married and had two children. He lived the last years of his life in Hellerup. He died in December 1951, aged 75. He is buried at Bispebjerg Cemetery, but the burial site has been closed.
