= Denmark national football team results (unofficial matches) =

This is a list of the Denmark national football team results results from 1896 to the present day that, for various reasons, are not accorded the status of official internationals and are not being recognized by FIFA. Denmark played several unofficial matches against British clubs, and did it under several different names such as Danish Football Union, Denmark XI, or Select Denmark.

Select Copenhagen XI was a football team that represented the city of Copenhagen. Notably, it played five matches against Liverpool F.C. in 1910, 1914, and 1932, registering a win, a draw, and three losses.

== 1890s ==
=== 1896 Olympic Games ===
12 April 1896 1896 Summer Olympics	Greece	0–9 or 0–15	Denmark	Athens, Greece
15:40		Report		Stadium: Podilatodromio; Attendance: 6,000; Referee: Prince George of Greece and Denmark (Greece)
Note: The International Olympic Committee does not acknowledge that football was played at the 1896 Olympics; however, there is incontrovertible evidence that this match was played as a demonstration sport.

=== Friendlies ===
18 April 1897 Friendly	Altona FA (German Empire)	0–5	Denmark	Hamburg, Germany
	? ?'	Report	? ?'	Attendance: 5,000

30 May 1898 Friendly	Danish Football Union (Denmark)	0 – 7	(Scotland) Queen's Park	København, Denmark
		Report

1 June 1898 Friendly	Danish Football Union (Denmark)	0 – 3	(Scotland) Queen's Park	København, Denmark
		Report

== 1900s ==
=== 1906 Intercalated Games ===
23 April 1906 1906 Intercalated Games semi-finals	Denmark	5–1	(Ottoman Empire) Smyrna	Athens
		Report		Stadium: Podilatodromio; Referee: Goster Drake (Sweden)

24 April 1906 1906 Intercalated Games Final	Athens City (Greece)	0–9	Denmark	Athens, Greece
		Report		Stadium: Podilatodromio; Referee: Goster Drake (Sweden)
Note: The Athens team withdrew from the final at half-time, because they were losing 0-9 at home and wanted to avoid further humiliation.

=== Friendlies ===
21 May 1900 Friendly	Danish Football Union (Denmark)	1 – 6	(Scotland) Queen's Park	København, Denmark
		Report

24 May 1900 Friendly	Danish Football Union (Denmark)	1 – 8	(Scotland) Queen's Park	København, Denmark
		Report

30 April 1903 Friendly	Select Copenhagen (Denmark)	0 – 3	(England) Southampton	København, Denmark
		Report

3 June 1903 Friendly	Danish Football Union (Denmark)	1 – 4	(Scotland) Queen's Park	København, Denmark
		Report

1 May 1904 Friendly	Danish Football Union (Denmark)	0 – 1	(England) Southampton	København, Denmark
		Report

5 May 1904 Friendly	Select Copenhagen (Denmark)	1 – 3	(England) Southampton	København, Denmark
		Report

8 May 1904 Friendly	Copenhagen XI (Denmark)	2 – 6	(England) Newcastle United	København, Denmark
		Report

12 May 1904 Friendly	Denmark XI	1 – 3	(England) Newcastle United	København, Denmark
		Report

19 May 1905 Friendly	Select Copenhagen (Denmark)	8 – 1	(England) Ilford	København, Denmark
		Report

25 May 1905 Friendly	Select Copenhagen (Denmark)	6 – 1	(England) Ilford	København, Denmark
		Report

28 May 1905 Friendly	Denmark XI	1 – 1	(England) Ilford	København, Denmark
		Report

11 May 1906 Friendly	Select Copenhagen (Denmark)	3 – 1	(England) Southampton	København, Denmark
		Report

13 May 1906 Friendly	Select Copenhagen (Denmark)	4 – 4	(England) Southampton	København, Denmark
		Report

15 May 1908 Friendly	Select Denmark	2 – 2	(Scotland) Queen's Park	København, Denmark
		Report

19 May 1908 Friendly	Select Denmark	1 – 1	(Scotland) Queen's Park	København, Denmark
		Report

7 May 1909 Friendly	Select Copenhagen (Denmark)	2 – 2	(England) Southampton	København, Denmark
		Report

16 May 1909 Friendly	Denmark XI	1 – 1	(England) Newcastle United	København, Denmark
		Report

20 May 1909 Friendly	Denmark XI	2 – 3	(England) Newcastle United	København, Denmark
		Report

23 May 1909 Friendly	Denmark XI	1 – 2	(England) Newcastle United	København, Denmark
		Report

28 May 1909 Friendly	Danish XI (Denmark)	3 – 1	(England) West Brom	København, Denmark
		Report

== 1910s ==
22 May 1910 Friendly	Select Copenhagen (Denmark)	3 – 0	(England) Liverpool	København, Denmark
	?	Report1; Report2

24 May 1910 Friendly	Select Copenhagen (Denmark)	0 – 1	(England) Liverpool	København, Denmark
		Report1; Report2	?
Note: This game was actually supposed to take place on Friday 20th May, but was moved as a mark of respect due to the funeral of King Edward VII that day.

1 June 1910 Friendly	Select Denmark	1 – 1	(England) Notts County	København, Denmark
		Report

4 June 1910 Friendly	Select Denmark	2 – 4	(England) Notts County	København, Denmark
		Report

6 June 1910 Friendly	Select Denmark	1 – 2	(England) Notts County	København, Denmark
		Report

25 May 1911 Friendly	Denmark XI	2 – 3	(England) Sheffield Wednesday	København, Denmark
		Report

28 May 1911 Friendly	Denmark XI	2 – 3	(England) Sheffield Wednesday	København, Denmark
		Report

8 June 1911 Friendly	Select Denmark	1 – 1	(Scotland) Rangers	København, Denmark
		Report

11 June 1911 Friendly	Select Denmark	1 – 3	(Scotland) Rangers	København, Denmark
		Report

8 September 1911 Friendly	Danish Football Union (Denmark)	6 – 2	(England) English Wanderers	København, Denmark
		Report

10 September 1911 Friendly	Danish Football Union (Denmark)	1 – 0	(England) Southampton	København, Denmark
		Report

1 May 1913 Friendly	Select Copenhagen (Denmark)	1 – 0	(England) Birmingham City	København, Denmark
		Report

4 May 1913 Friendly	Select Copenhagen (Denmark)	5 – 4	(England) Birmingham City	København, Denmark
		Report

12 May 1913 Friendly	Denmark XI	1 – 4	(England) Newcastle United	København, Denmark
		Report

15 May 1913 Friendly	Denmark XI	2 – 3	(England) Newcastle United	København, Denmark
		Report

18 May 1913 Friendly	Denmark XI	1 – 1	(England) Newcastle United	København, Denmark
		Report

5 June 1913 Friendly	Select Denmark	1 – 2	(Scotland) Rangers	København, Denmark
		Report

8 June 1913 Friendly	Select Denmark	1 – 1	(Scotland) Rangers	København, Denmark
		Report

24 May 1914 Friendly	Select Copenhagen (Denmark)	3 – 3	(England) Liverpool	København, Denmark
	?	Report1; Report2	Lacey; Tom Miller; Metcalf	Attendance: 15,000

26 May 1914 Friendly	Select Denmark	1 – 7	(England) Liverpool	København, Denmark
	?? (pen.)	Report1; Report2	Unknown; Billy Banks; Lacey; Fairfoul ? (o.g.)

7 June 1914 Friendly	Select Copenhagen (Denmark)	1 – 2	(England) Heart of Midlothian	København, Denmark
		Report

9 June 1914 Friendly	Select Denmark	1 – 2	(England) Heart of Midlothian	København, Denmark
		Report

== 1920s ==
22 May 1921 Friendly	Select Copenhagen (Denmark)	4 – 3	(Scotland) Queen's Park	København, Denmark
		Report

24 May 1921 Friendly	Select Copenhagen (Denmark)	2 – 3	(Scotland) Queen's Park	København, Denmark
		Report

25 May 1921 Friendly	Select Copenhagen (Denmark)	6 – 1	(Scotland) Queen's Park	København, Denmark
		Report

5 June 1921 Friendly	Copenhagen XI (Denmark)	1 – 2	(Scotland) Rangers	København, Denmark
		Report

28 May 1922 Friendly	Copenhagen XI (Denmark)	1 – 2	(England) Newcastle United	København, Denmark
		Report

30 May 1922 Friendly	Copenhagen XI (Denmark)	0 – 1	(England) Newcastle United	København, Denmark
		Report

1 June 1922 Friendly	Copenhagen XI (Denmark)	0 – 1	(Scotland) Rangers	København, Denmark
		Report

4 June 1922 Friendly	Copenhagen XI (Denmark)	0 – 3	(Scotland) Rangers	København, Denmark
		Report

5 June 1922 Friendly	Denmark XI	2 – 2	(Scotland) Rangers	København, Denmark
		Report

13 May 1923 Friendly	Danish XI (Denmark)	1 – 2	(England) Arsenal	København, Denmark
		Report

25 May 1923 Friendly	Select Copenhagen (Denmark)	0 – 3	(England) Notts County	København, Denmark
		Report

27 May 1923 Friendly	Select Copenhagen (Denmark)	0 – 1	(England) Notts County	København, Denmark
		Report

29 May 1923 Friendly	Danish XI (Denmark)	2 – 3	(England) Notts County	København, Denmark
		Report

8 June 1926 Friendly	Copenhagen XI (Denmark)	1 – 4	(England) Aston Villa	København, Denmark
		Report

10 June 1926 Friendly	Copenhagen XI (Denmark)	2 – 5	(England) Aston Villa	København, Denmark
		Report

15 May 1927 Friendly	Select Copenhagen (Denmark)	1 – 5	(England) West Ham United	København, Denmark
		Report

17 May 1927 Friendly	Select Denmark	1 – 3	(England) West Ham United	København, Denmark
		Report

20 May 1927 Friendly	Select Denmark	0 – 2	(England) West Ham United	København, Denmark
		Report

17 May 1928 Friendly	Danish XI (Denmark)	2 – 3	(England) Arsenal	København, Denmark
		Report

20 May 1928 Friendly	Danish XI (Denmark)	0 – 1	(England) Arsenal	København, Denmark
		Report

22 May 1928 Friendly	Select Denmark	3 – 5	(England) Arsenal	København, Denmark
		Report

12 May 1929 Friendly	Select Copenhagen (Denmark)	0 – 5	(Scotland) Queen's Park	København, Denmark
		Report

17 May 1929 Friendly	Select Copenhagen (Denmark)	2 – 3	(Scotland) Queen's Park	København, Denmark
		Report

16 June 1929 Friendly	Copenhagen XI (Denmark)	3 – 4	(England) Middlesex Wanderers	København, Denmark
		Report

== 1930s ==
16 May 1930 Friendly	Select Copenhagen (Denmark)	2 – 0	(England) Birmingham City	København, Denmark
		Report

18 May 1930 Friendly	Select Copenhagen (Denmark)	1 – 2	(England) Birmingham City	København, Denmark
		Report

20 May 1930 Friendly	Select Copenhagen (Denmark)	4 – 5	(England) Birmingham City	København, Denmark
		Report

8 June 1930 Friendly	Select Copenhagen (Denmark)	3 – 3	(England) West Ham United	København, Denmark
		Report

14 May 1931 Friendly	Danish XI (Denmark)	0 – 2	(England) Arsenal	København, Denmark
		Report

17 May 1931 Friendly	Danish XI (Denmark)	1 – 5	(England) Arsenal	København, Denmark
		Report

19 May 1931 Friendly	Copenhagen XI (Denmark)	1 – 1	(England) Arsenal	København, Denmark
		Report

27 May 1932 Friendly	Select Copenhagen (Denmark)	1 – 3	(England) Liverpool	København, Denmark
	?	Report1; Report2	Gunson 16'; Hancock 17'; Barton 83'	Attendance: 6,000
Note: The Danish team was selected from the best players in the Danish League whereas for the match two days later the Danish team was selected solely from Copenhagen-based players.

29 May 1932 Friendly	Select Copenhagen (Denmark)	1 – 4	(England) Liverpool	København, Denmark
	? (pen.)	Report1; Report2	Wright; Gunson; Bob Done	Attendance: 10,000

1 June 1932 Friendly	Select Copenhagen (Denmark)	3 – 4	(England) Birmingham City	København, Denmark
		Report

16 April 1933 Friendly	Danish XI (Denmark)	2 – 2	(England) Corinthian	København, Denmark
		Report

18 May 1934 Friendly	Denmark XI	1 – 2	(England) Huddersfield Town	København, Denmark
		Report

3 June 1936 Friendly	Copenhagen XI (Denmark)	3 – 2	(England) Sheffield United	København, Denmark
		Report

5 June 1936 Friendly	Denmark XI	0 – 1	(England) Sheffield United	København, Denmark
		Report

8 June 1936 Friendly	Denmark XI	0 – 1	(England) Sheffield United	København, Denmark
		Report

19 May 1937 Friendly	Select Copenhagen (Denmark)	3 – 4	(England) Everton	København, Denmark
		Report

21 May 1937 Friendly	Select Copenhagen (Denmark)	1 – 4	(England) Everton	København, Denmark
		Report

23 May 1937 Friendly	Danish XI (Denmark)	0 – 0	(England) Everton	København, Denmark
		Report

16 May 1938 Friendly	Select Copenhagen (Denmark)	1 – 3	(England) Chelsea	København, Denmark
		Report

18 May 1938 Friendly	Select Copenhagen (Denmark)	1 – 4	(England) Chelsea	København, Denmark
		Report

20 May 1938 Friendly	Danish XI (Denmark)	0 – 2	(England) Chelsea	København, Denmark
		Report
