= Gordon Gunson =

English footballer

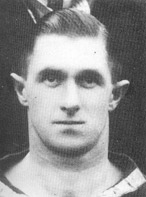
- Wrexham teamphoto in 1921

Personal information
- Full name: Joseph Gordon Gunson
- Date of birth: 1 July 1904
- Place of birth: Chester, England
- Date of death: 8 September 1991 (aged 87)
- Height: 5 ft 7 1/2 in (1.71 m)
- Positions: Winger; striker

Senior career*
Years	Team	Apps	(Gls)
1923–1924	Nelson	0	(0)
1926–1929	Wrexham	116	(32)
1929–1930	Sunderland	19	(11)
1930–1934	Liverpool	81	(24)
1934–1935	Swindon Town	31	(8)
1935–1936	Wrexham	15	(5)
Total		262	(80)
- * Club domestic league appearances and goals

Joseph Gordon Gunson (1 July 1904 – 8 September 1991) was an English footballer who played for Brickfields FC, Nelson, Wrexham, Sunderland, Liverpool, Swindon and Bangor City.

== Liverpool ==
Gordon was a winger for Liverpool who played in the period of 1930 to 1934. He made his debut for the club in a match against Bolton Wanderers on 15 March 1930. He then started a run of 10 consecutive appearances until the completion of the season. His run ended at the beginning of the new season 1930 – 1931 and only appeared 9 times that season. It was different in the season 1931–1932, he was ever-presents along with Tom Bradshaw and scoring 17 times in the 42 games.

His consecutive run continued to 57 games by the early start of November 1932. He then lost his place for brief period of time to Harold Taylor but then reclaimed it back for a short time. His last Appearance for Liverpool came on 25 March 1933, the match was at home in the first division against Blackburn Rovers which ended in a 2–2 draw.

== Career details ==
As a player:

- Liverpool: 87 Appearances, 26 Goals
