= Albert Whittall =

Anglo-Ottoman footballer (1879–1957)

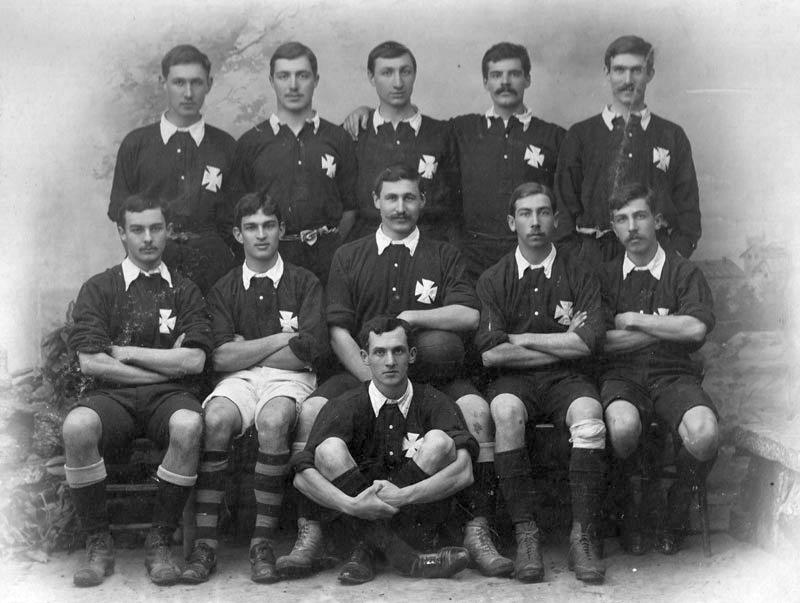
- Whittall (seated on chair, center, with the ball) in 1906

Personal information
- Full name: Albert James Whittall
- Date of birth: 14 June 1879
- Place of birth: İzmir, Ottoman Empire
- Date of death: 8 August 1957 (aged 78)
- Place of death: İzmir, Ottoman Empire
- Position: Forward

Senior career*
Years	Team	Apps	(Gls)
1894–1906	Bournabat FC		

International career
1906	Smyrna XI	2	(+0)
Medal record
Men's football
Representing Turkey
Football at the Summer Olympics
Silver medal – second place	1906 Athens	Team competition
- * Club domestic league appearances and goals

Albert James Whittall (14 June 1879 – 8 August 1957) was an Anglo-Ottoman footballer who played as a forward for Bournabat FC and was one of five members of the Whittall family who competed in the football tournament at the 1906 Intercalated Games in Athens, winning a silver medal as a member of the Bournabat Olympic team representing Smyrna.

== Early life and education ==
Edward Whittall was born in İzmir on 14 June 1879, as the second of nine children from the marriage of Mary Maltass (1851–1938) and Edward Whittall, an Anglo-Ottoman merchant and amateur botanist. The founder of the family was the Liverpool-born Charlton Whittall (1791–1867), who worked for a trading company in his hometown, which sent him to Smyrna (now İzmir), a major sea port, where he later set up his own trading company named C. Whittall & Co. This firm exported Turkish products to England, and was thus later absorbed by the Levant Company, a trading company that controlled and regulated trade between England and Turkey.

As the son of a well-off family, Whittall was sent abroad to complete his studies in England, attending the Uppingham School from September 1893 until April 1896.

== Playing career ==
Whittall began playing football at Bournabat FC, which had been founded in Bornova in the late 1880s by several young merchants from the vast colony of Westerners living in Levant, specifically of British and French nationality, such as prominent members of the wealthy Whithall and La Fontaine families residing in Izmir; in fact, in Bournabat's first-ever recorded match in 1894, the club fielded several members of those families, including the 15-year-old Albert and his uncle Herbert, who played a crucial role in helping Bournabat became the strongest team in Smyrna in the 1890s.

Between 1897 and 1899, Whittall started in Turkey's first-ever inter-city games, which were played by selection teams of Smyrna and Istanbul, helping his side win all of them. After a five-year hiatus, these two sides faced each other for one last time, with Albert starting alongside his younger brother Edward in an eventual 4–2 victory. This meant that football in Smyrna was the best one in the Ottoman Empire, hence why the Greeks invited a team from that region to participate in the 1906 Intercalated Games in Athens. The team that represented Smyrna at the Olympics was entirely composed of players from Bournabat FC, half of whom were members of the Whittall family: Albert and his younger brothers Albert and Godfrey, along with two cousins, Herbert and Donald, with the latter also participating in the rowing event. Aged 26 years and 313 days, Albert was the oldest player in the tournament, and as such, he served as the team's captain.

At the Olympics, Smyrna were knocked-out in the semifinals by a Copenhagen XI (5–1), who went on claim gold, but the withdrawal of the Athens team during the final and their subsequent disqualification meant that Smyrna and Thessaloniki would face each other for second place on 25 April 1906, in which the Whittalls, who formed a powerful attacking quintet, played a crucial role in helping their side to a 12–0 victory, thus winning the silver medal, which still is the greatest success of Izmir football in official matches.

== Later life and death ==
In 1904, the 25-year-old Whittall married Agnes Maud Keyser (1884–1967), with whom he had three children, Ruby (1907–?), Edward (1910–?), and Peggy (1920–1996). He died at İzmir on 8 August 1957, at the age of 78.

== Honours ==
Smyrna XI

- Intercalated Games
  - Silver medalists (1): 1906 (representing Smyrna XI)
