= Bournabat Football Club =

Turkish football & rugby union club, based in Smyrna

Bournabat Football and Rugby Club
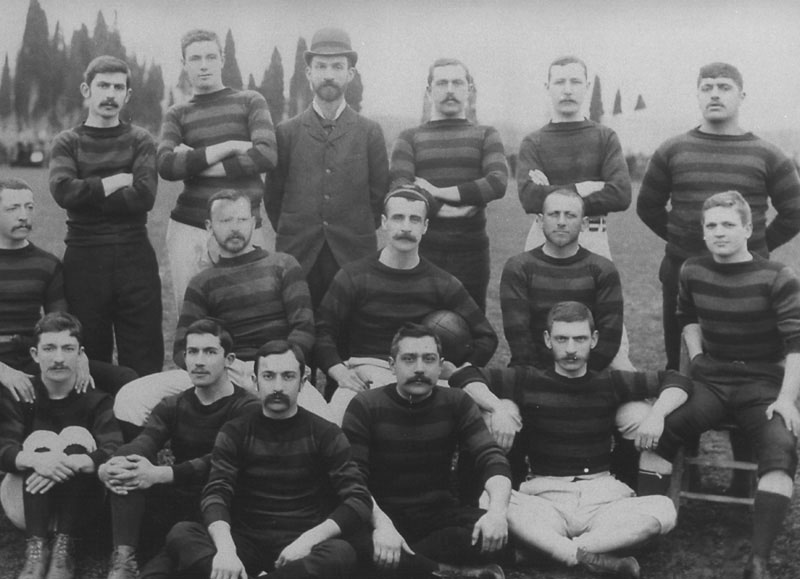
- Bournabat FC in 1894
- Full name: Bournabat Football and Rugby Club
- Founded: 1880s
- Ground: Bornova Stadium, Bornova, Smyrna
Home colours

Bournabat Football and Rugby Club (Greek: Αθλητικός Όμιλος Μπουρνόβα) was a sports club of Bornova, Smyrna (present-day İzmir), Ottoman Empire. Bournabat FC was consisted of Levantine players and is considered as the first football club ever in Turkey. The club's colours were red and black. It was dissolved after the Burning of Smyrna in 1922 as most of the Levantines fled the country.

== History ==
=== First years ===
Bournabat Football and Rugby Club was founded in Bornova, an upscale suburb of Smyrna, inhabited mainly by Greeks and Levantines, in late 1880s. The club's players also competed in other sports as every year at St George celebrations at the Bornova Stadium, such as a competition called the Panionian Games organized by Panionios F.C.. The club co-existed in Bornova with other sports clubs, the Bournabat Junior Athletical Association (B.J.A.A.), consisting of young athletes, and Athletic Union of Bornova, at the time.

The first recorded match in the Smyrna area was between Bournabat and Smyrna FC in 1894 at the Bornova meadow. Bournabat FC was the strongest team in Smyrna in the 1890s. This team consisted of English and French players with the Greek language used as means of communication: MJ Whithall, Ed. Charnaud, Percy Joly, Jim. R. Giraud, Pelcoc Whithall, AJ Whithall, Herbert Joly, AE La Fontaine, Edmund Giraud, Jim Gout, Hav. Joly, Th. Tarrazzi, Herbert Whithall, D. Whithall, Eddie Whithall, G. Whithall, J. Whithall.

In 1889 Bournabat played against Constantinople FC and there is a report from that historical match, according to historian Mehmet Yüce from 2012:

1889, January 14, Monday
14:00

| Constantinople Football Club | 3–0 | Bournabat FRC |
|---|---|---|
| Ernt Thompson (2), John Thompson (1) | Match played under rugby union rules |

Yaourt Tchesme, Moda. Constantinople
Attendance: 1000
Referee: unknown

The squads were:
Bournabat Football Club: Walter E. Lawson, Charles Wilkinson, Edgar Giraud, Harry Giraud, Charles Giraud, J. Wilkinson, Richard Whittall Junior, Horald Lawson, Reginald Lawson, Louis Senn, Francis Barker, F. Le Bailly, James Joly, Godfrey Barker, Robert Wakeford.
Constantinople Football Club: Biliniski (defenders) – Ernest Thomson, Edwin Whittall, Frank Barker (midfielders) – Willie Whitall and Mountain (defensive midfielders) – J. Thomson, Fitzmaurice, Osman, Hampson, John Thomson, Reggie Whitall, H. Barker, B. Bond and Sellar (forwards).

=== 1906 Olympics squad ===
In 1906 the club won the Olympic tournament of Smyrna against Apollon Smyrnis and Panionios and its players represented the city in the 1906 Olympics in Athens. Bournabat FC had five members of the Whittall family that won the 1906 Olympic football silver medal. Herbert Whittall, his cousins Albert, Edward, Godfrey and Donald Whittall, along with two other cousins, Jacques and Edmund Giraud and Percy la Fontiane made up the majority of the Smyrna team. Hebert Octavius was at one time the ‘manager’ of the Rugby & Football team in its early days.

The club's squad reperesented Smyrna XI in the 1906 Olympics in Athens.

| No. | Pos. | Player | Date of birth (age) | Club |
|---|---|---|---|---|
| | DF | (France) Edmund Giraud | 29 November 1880 (aged 25) | (Ottoman Empire Football Association) Bournabat FC |
| | MF | (France) Jim Giraud | 14 May 1882 (aged 23) | (Ottoman Empire Football Association) Bournabat FC |
| | MF | (France) Henri Joly | | (Ottoman Empire Football Association) Bournabat FC |
| | GK | (United Kingdom) Edwin Charnaud | 0 December 1886 (aged 19–20) | (Ottoman Empire Football Association) Bournabat FC |
| | MF | (United Kingdom) Percy La Fontaine | 0 December 1888 (aged 17–18) | (Ottoman Empire Football Association) Bournabat FC |
| | FW | (United Kingdom) Albert Whittall | 14 June 1879 (aged 26) | (Ottoman Empire Football Association) Bournabat FC |
| | FW | (United Kingdom) Donald Whittall | 25 February 1881 (aged 25) | (Ottoman Empire Football Association) Bournabat FC |
| | FW | (United Kingdom) Edward Whittall | 5 May 1888 (aged 17) | (Ottoman Empire Football Association) Bournabat FC |
| | FW | (United Kingdom) Godfrey Whittall | 24 December 1882 (aged 23) | (Ottoman Empire Football Association) Bournabat FC |
| | FW | (United Kingdom) Herbert Whittall | 0 December 1884 (aged 21–22) | (Ottoman Empire Football Association) Bournabat FC |
| | DF | (United Kingdom) Zareh Couyoumdjian | 0 December 1883 (aged 22–23) | (Ottoman Empire Football Association) Bournabat FC |

=== Later years ===
In 1907 and 1908 two more clubs were founded in Bornova, Ermis and Thiseas, both of Greek background, but none was as dominant as Bournabat FC. The club was one of the most powerful in Smyrna during the 1910s competing with Greek and Armenian teams. No team from the area of Smyrna had ever beat the club until 1914, when it lost to Turkish club Altay S.K. by 3–1 in a friendly. Following the next years until 1922, the club changed its name to Barbarian and competed in the Smyrna football league sanctioned by the Hellenic Athletics Federation.

All of the club's players, as most of the Levantine clubs had a Greek NOC for travel purposes.

=== Smyrna XI Matches ===
Smyrna XI consisted of players from the Smyrna area (Apollon Smyrnis, Panionios, Maccabi etc.) playing friendlies in Greece and Constantinople and representing th city in the Olympics. Most of the Smyrna XI players who played friendlies in Constantinople were from Bournabat FC. The emblem of the Smyrna XI was a Cross pattée to show the dominance of Christianity in the city.

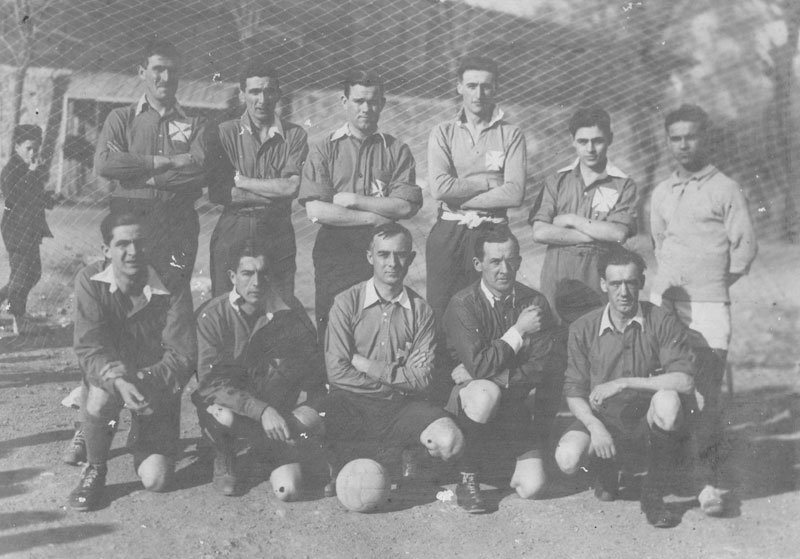
The Smyrna XI in the 1910s, with majority of players from Bournabat FC

1897

| Smyrna XI | 2–1 | Moda FC |

Constantinople
Referee: unknown

1898

| Smyrna XI | 3–2 | Moda FC |

Smyrna
Referee: unknown

1899

| Smyrna XI | 1–0 | Moda FC |
|---|---|---|
| | (Report) |

Smyrna
Referee: unknown

1902

| Smyrna XI | 10–20 | Royal Navy Crew |
|---|---|---|
| | (Report) |

Smyrna
Referee: unknown

1904

| Smyrna XI | 4–2 | Moda FC |
|---|---|---|
| | (Report) |

Smyrna
Referee: unknown

11 December 1908

| Smyrna XI | 3–1 | Galatasaray SK |
|---|---|---|
| | (Report) |

Constantinople
Referee: unknown

2 June 1913

| Smyrna XI | 1–2 | Galatasaray SK |
|---|---|---|
| | (Report) |

Constantinople
Referee: unknown

2 June 1913

| Smyrna XI | 1–4 | Fenerbahçe SK |
|---|---|---|
| | (Report) |

Constantinople
Referee: unknown

2 June 1913

| Smyrna XI | 0–2 | Istanbul Team (6 Fenerbahçe players and 5 Galatasaray players) |
|---|---|---|
| | (Report) |

Constantinople
Referee: unknown

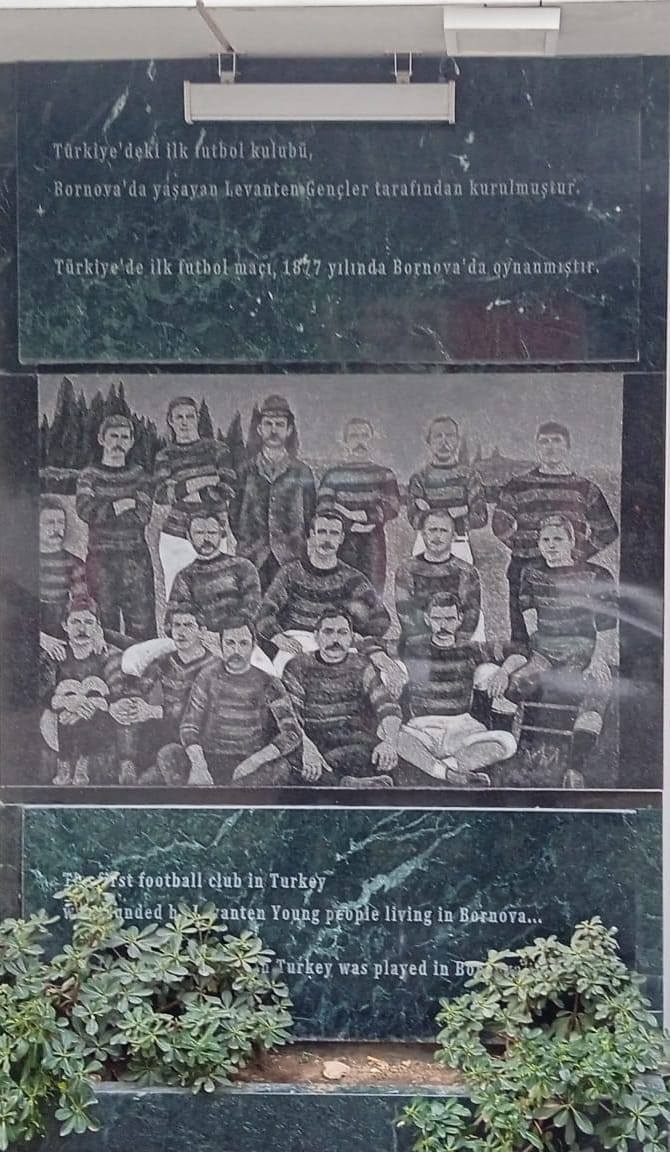
Monument in honor of the Bournabat club, in Bornova.

== Notable players ==
- (United Kingdom) Percy La Fontaine
- (United Kingdom) Edward Whittall
- (United Kingdom) Albert Whittall
- (United Kingdom) Edwin Charnaud
- (United Kingdom) Donald Whittall
- (United Kingdom) Herbert Whittall
- (France) Jim Giraud
- (France) Edmund Giraud
- (Greece) Mamakos (defender)

== Notable managers ==
- (United Kingdom) Herbert Octavius Whittall (b.1858 - died 1929)

== Honours ==
Domestic

- Olympic Tournament of Smyrna
  - Winners (1): 1906
- Bornova Tournament
  - Winners (2): 1894, 1897

International

- Intercalated Games
  - Silver medalists (1): 1906 (representing Smyrna XI)

== See also ==
- List of Turkish Sports Clubs by Foundation Dates

== Sources ==
- Smyrna Football Club, İzmir
- Football in Smyrna, History until 1922
- History of Bornova
