= Axel Andersen Byrval =

Danish footballer and manager (1875–1957)

Personal information
- Full name: Axel Andreas Jacob Andersen Byrval
- Date of birth: 13 March 1875
- Place of birth: Copenhagen, Denmark
- Date of death: 1957
- Position: Forward

Youth career
- 1888–: Boldklubben Frem

Senior career*
Years	Team	Apps	(Gls)
–1895	Boldklubben Frem		
1895–1896	B 93		
1896–1909	Boldklubben Frem		

Managerial career
- 1903–1907: B 93
- 1908–1911: Boldklubben Frem
- 1913–1915: Denmark
- 1917–1918: Denmark
- 1925: Boldklubben Frem
- * Club domestic league appearances and goals

Axel Andreas Jacob Andersen Byrval (13 March 1875 – 1957) was a Danish amateur football player and manager. He played for Boldklubben Frem, where he was also a cricketer. Byrval was the manager of the Denmark national team for 16 matches in the years 1913–1915 and 1917–1918.

== Biography ==
Born in Copenhagen, Byrval started playing football with Boldklubben Frem. In 1895, several players left Frem, and Byrval and Peter Mikkelsen went on to play for B 93. They returned to Frem in 1897, and were the first two players to represent Frem at an international level, when they were a part of the first Denmark national selection, composed solely of players from the Copenhagen clubs.

He participated in at least one international game for the Danish selection, against a German team in Hamburg. The match was won 5–0 by the Danish team and had 5,000 spectators. Although it was a de facto international organized by the Danish Football Association (DBU), the game is not a sanctioned Denmark national team match, as DBU did not register games as official until the 1908 Summer Olympics.

Byrval coached both B 93 and Frem, before he was appointed Denmark national team coach in May 1913. He managed the Danish team to victory in his first eight games until October 1915, including 8–0 and 10–0 defeats of Sweden. The Danish team played four games without an official coach appointed in 1916, before Byrval once again coached the team from June 1917 to October 1918, including a 12–0 defeat of Norway. In all, he coached 16 national team games, winning 14, drawing one and losing one.

In his civil life, Byrval was a physical education schoolmaster with the municipal schools of Copenhagen, a voluntary Intendant with Korps Westenholz and a non-commissioned officer with the Royal Life Guards.
