= Ethnikos G.S. Athens =

Multisports club in Greece

- Full name: Εθνικός Γυμναστικός Σύλλογος; Ethnikos Gymnastikos Syllogos; (National Gymnastic Club)
- Founded: 23 May 1893; 132 years ago
- Based in: Athens, Greece
- Colours: Black, White
- President: Iason Platsis
- Website: www.ethnikosgs.gr

Ethnikos G.S. Athens
Home colours	Away colours

Ethnikos Gymnastikos Syllogos (Greek: Εθνικός Γυμναστικός Σύλλογος, lit. 'National Gymnastic Club') or Ethnikos Athens is one of the oldest multi-sports clubs in Greece. It was founded on 23 May 1893.

== History ==
=== 1896 Olympics ===
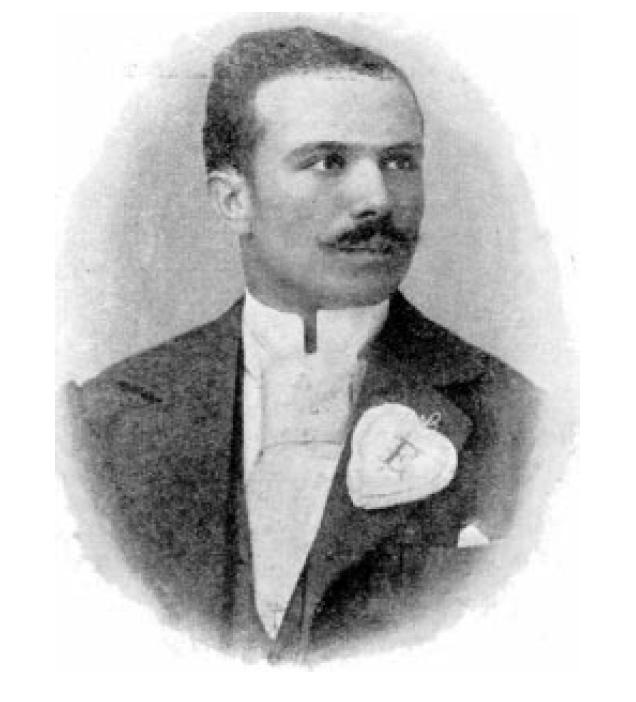
Ioannis Mitropoulos

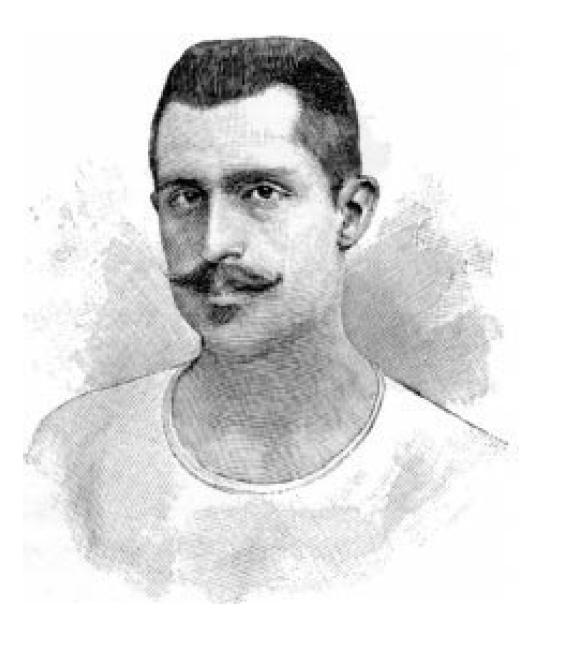
Panagiotis Paraskevopoulos

It had a team of gymnasts competing at the 1896 Summer Olympics in Athens.

The team's leader was Ioannis Chrysafis. Members included Ioannis Mitropoulos, Dimitrios Loundras, Filippos Karvelas, and 15 others whose names are unknown.

The team placed third of the three teams in the parallel bars team event, earning a bronze medal (retroactively awarded by the International Olympic Committee, as the awards at the first Olympic Games differed from the gold, silver, bronze format used later).

=== Football trophies ===
- Panhellenic Football Championship
  - Winner (2): 1906, 1907

== Titles ==
- Men's Athletics:
  - 21 Greek Championships: ( 1901, 1910, 1920, 1925, 1926, 1927, 1928, 1930, 1931, 1937, 1938, 1939, 1940, 1946, 1947, 1948, 1949, 1950, 1951, 1953, 1954)
  - 6 Greek Cross Country Championships: (1908, 1910, 1911, 1912, 1926, 1927)
- Women's Athletics:
  - 1 Greek Championship: (1975)
  - 1 Greek Cross Country Championship: (1982)
- Shooting:
  - 1 Greek Championship: (1937)
- Men's Boxing:
  - 2 Greek Championships: (1961, 1981)
- Women's Boxing:
  - 1 Greek Championships: (2013)
- Men's Greco-Roman Wrestling:
  - 35 Greek Championships, Men: (1936, 1937, 1938, 1939, 1940, 1946, 1947, 1948, 1949, 1950, 1951, 1952, 1958, 1960, 1962, 1964, 1965, 1966, 1968, 1969, 1971, 1973, 1974, 1975, 1977, 1978, 1979, 1980, 1981, 1982, 1984, 1985, 1986, 1987, 1988) (record)
- Men's Free Wrestling:
  - 4 Greek Championships, Men: (1958, 1959, 1960, 1966)
- Judo:
  - 5 Greek Championships, Men: (1993, 1995, 1996, 1998, 2001)

== See also ==
- 1905–06 Ethnikos G.S. Athens season
- 1906–07 Ethnikos G.S. Athens season
