= Edward Whittall (botanist) =

Botanist (1851–1917)

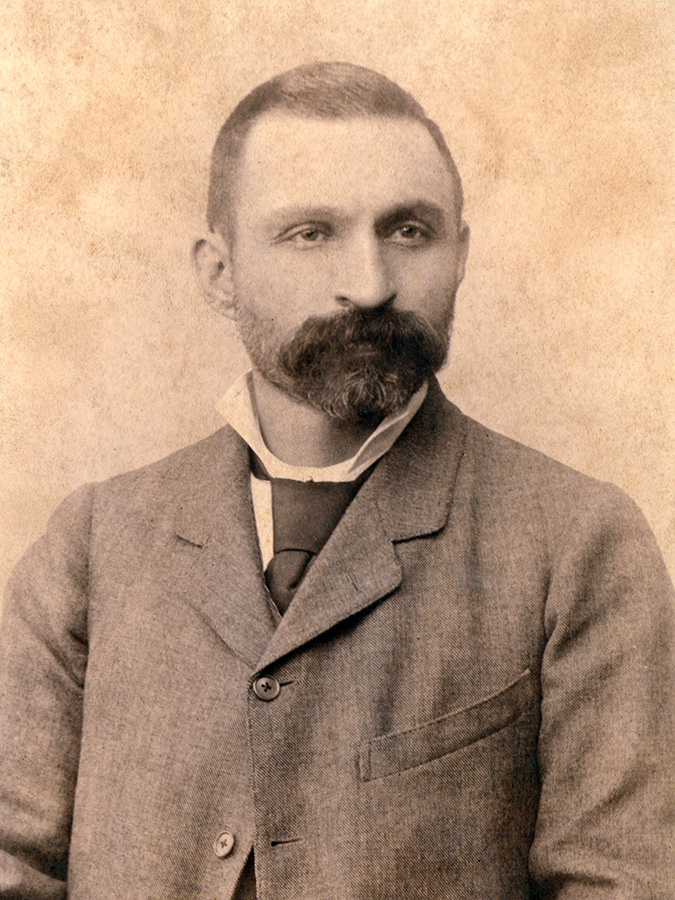
Edward Whittall, 1885

Edward Whittall (born Smyrna, Ottoman Empire, 9 September 1851; died 15 July 1917) was an Anglo-Ottoman merchant and amateur botanist best known today for sending many species of bulbs to Europe. The standard author abbreviation Whittall is used to indicate this person as the author when citing a botanical name.

== Family ==
Whittall's grandfather Charlton Whittall (1791-1867) and his brother James moved to Smyrna (now İzmir) starting in 1817, setting up a trading firm named C. Whittall & Co. This initially became a part of the British Levant Company until its dissolution in 1825. The Whittalls exported a variety of products to England including dyes, valonea (an oak product used in tanning), dried fruits, and cotton.

Edward Whittall was the son of James Whittall (1819-1883), second son of Charlton Whittall, and Magdelaine Giraud (1823-1912), a member of a merchant family of Venetian origin which intermarried multiple times with the Whittalls. James Whittall was a coin collector; he contributed to a collection now in the British Museum. Edward Whittall married Mary Maltass (1851-1938) in 1875 and they had nine children together. Three of his sons - Albert (1879-1957), Edward (1888-1947), and Godfrey (1882-1957) - were among five Whittalls on a football team that represented Smyrna at the 1906 Intercalated Games in Athens.

Edward worked in the family firm of C. Whittall, although much of the work seems to have been done by his brother Herbert (1858-1929). According to English traveller Gertrude Bell writing in 1902, Edward Whittall was known to be a friend and advisor of statesman Kâmil Pasha, who was to return as Grand Vizier of the Ottoman Empire in 1908.

== Botanical interest ==
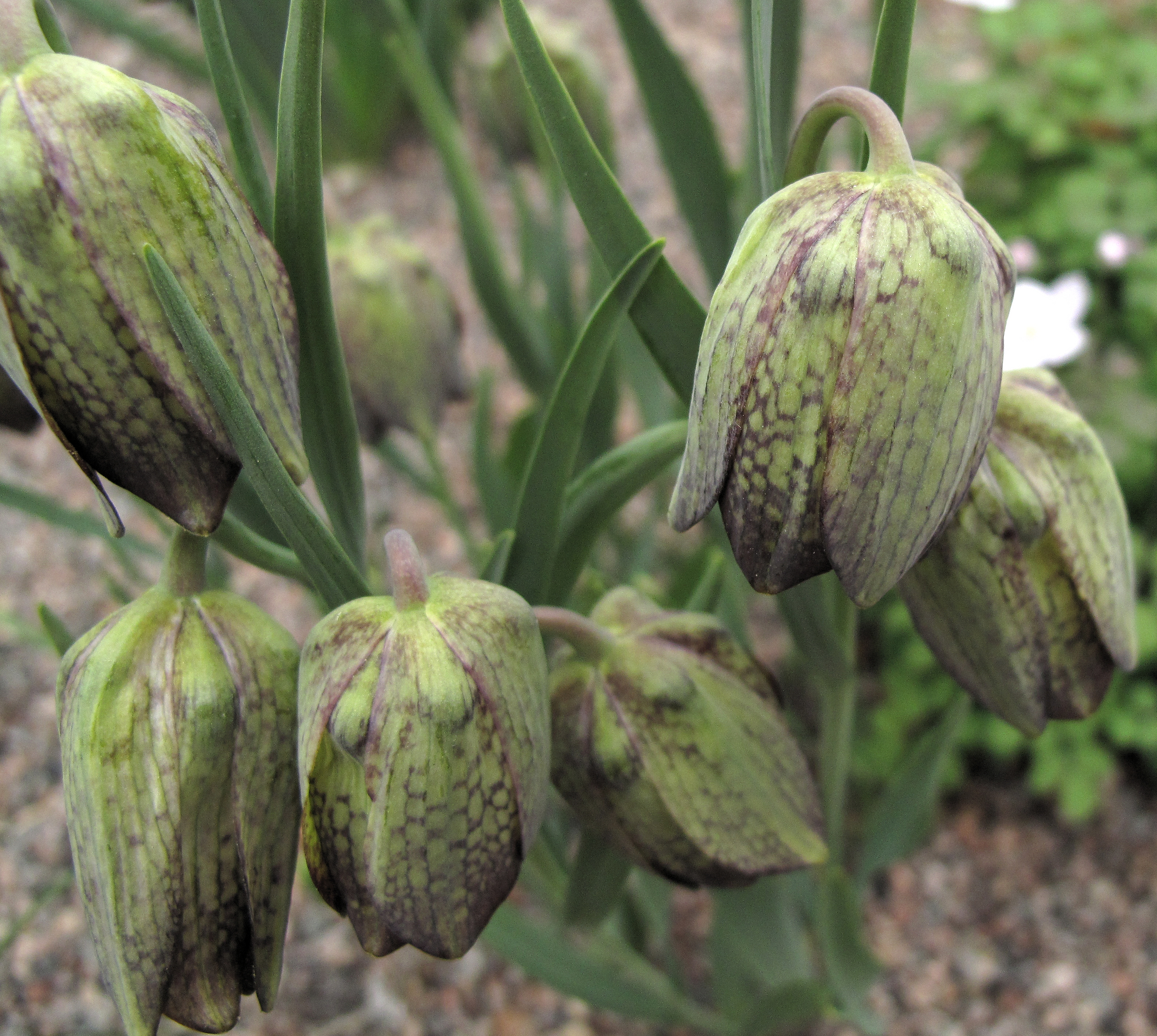
Fritillaria whittallii

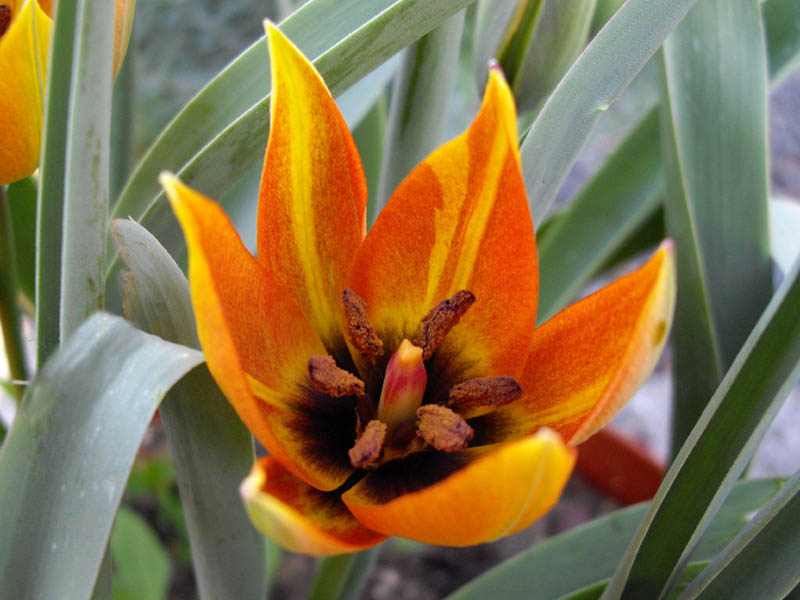
Tulipa whittallii

In 1874 Whittall, an avid sportsman who was fond of shooting in the nearby mountains, organized an expedition there with Henry John Elwes, a visiting British naturalist who had an increasing interest in plants. This sparked Whittall's interest in the local flora, and he began to collect them, at first with a mind to providing employment during slow periods for local villagers. Eventually he created a larger garden area on Nif dagı to hold his collection and sent some of them to be sold in Britain and Holland. Starting in 1890 he sent bulbs to Kew Gardens, asking only for help identifying the species. Several of the species were unknown to British botanists and John Gilbert Baker named several after Whittall, including Fritillaria whittallii, Veronica whittallii, and the subspecies Tulipa orphanidea whittallii. He sent large quantities of bulbs to Kew Gardens, sufficient for the Kew Bulletin of 1899 to report that "Kew owes its unique display of early flowering spring bulbs in great measure to the constant liberality of Mr. Edward Whittall, of Smyrna. We owe to him the sheets of white Galanthus elwesii and of blue Chionodoxa which each year produce more and more striking effects." Whittall was particularly interested in the Chionodoxa; his naming of Chionondoxa sardensis is still accepted today, although the Chionodoxa have modernly been moved into Scilla.

== Legacy ==
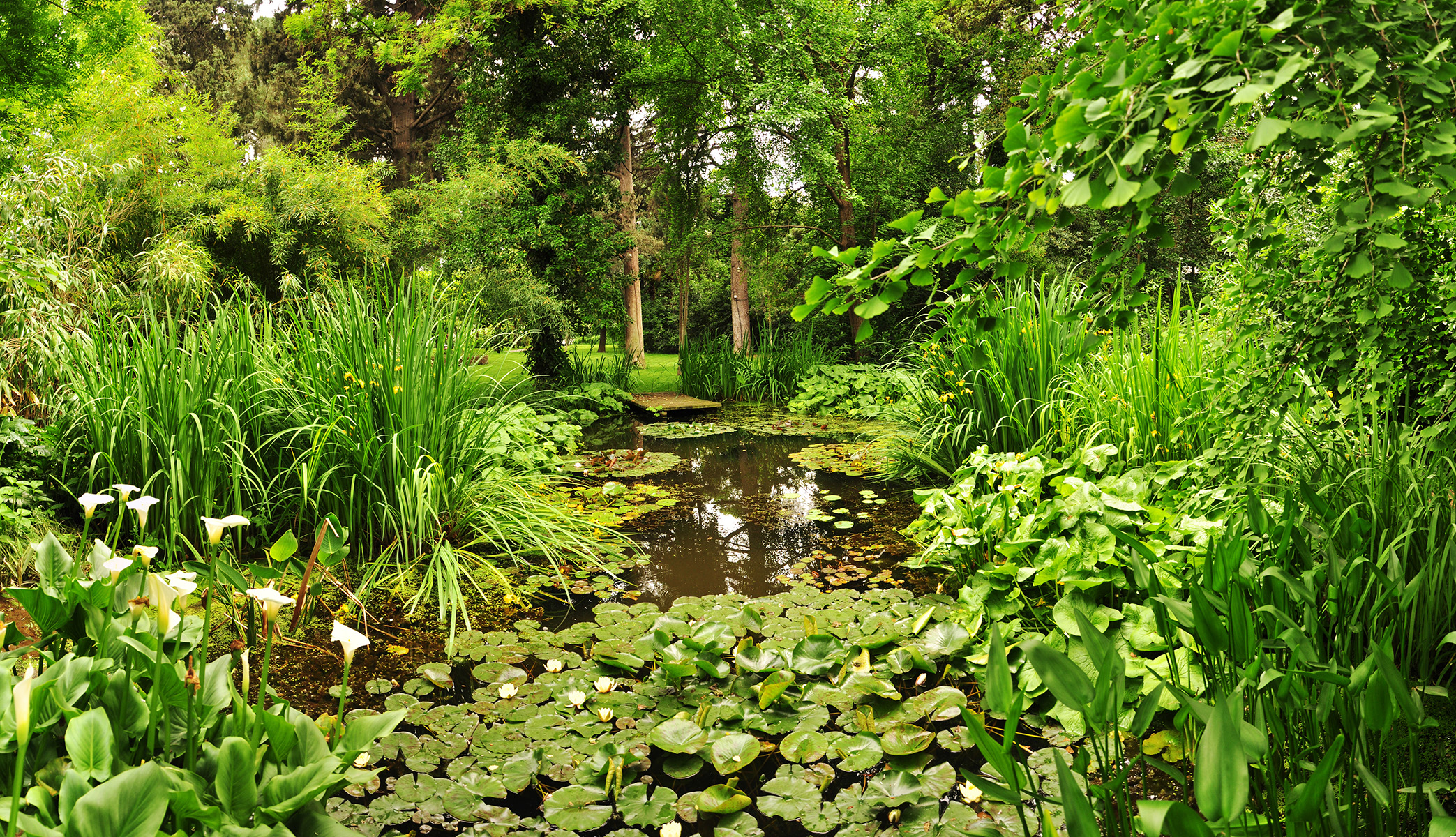
Edward Whittall's garden in Bornova, 2014

Whittall is buried in the Bornova Anglican Cemetery.

Whittall's house in the Bornova district of İzmir and its gardens still exist and as of 2021 are operated as a venue for weddings and events by Brian Giraud, a great-grandson.

== See also ==
- Whittall Mansion, Moda, built by Edward Whittall's brother Sir William Whittall (1838-1910)
