= Herbert Whittall (footballer, born 1858) =

Anglo-Ottoman footballer (1858–1929)

Personal information
- Full name: Herbert Octave Whittall
- Date of birth: 1858
- Place of birth: İzmir, Ottoman Empire
- Date of death: 3 February 1929 (aged 71)
- Place of death: Tunis, Tunisia
- Position: Forward

Senior career*
| Years | Team | Apps | (Gls) |
| 1894 | Bournabat FC | | |

Managerial career
- Bournabat FC
- * Club domestic league appearances and goals

Herbert Octave Whittall (1858 – 3 February 1929) was an Anglo-Ottoman footballer and manager of Bournabat FC in the 1890s.

== Early life ==
Herbert Whittall was born in İzmir in 1858, as the eleventh of thirteen children from the marriage formed by Magdeleine Blanche Giraud (1823–1912) and James John Whittall (1819–1883), the second son of the family's founder, the Liverpool-born Charlton Whittall (1791–1867), who worked for a trading company in his hometown, which sent him to Smyrna (now İzmir), a major sea port, where he later set up his own trading company named C. Whittall & Co.

This firm exported Turkish products to England, and was thus later absorbed by the Levant Company, a trading company that controlled and regulated trade between England and Turkey. This firm was eventually headed by Herbert and two of his brothers Richard and Edward, with the latter leaving much of the day-to-day running of the business to Herbert, who was much more efficient.

== Sporting career ==
Whittall was one of the first players of Bournabat FC, which had been founded in Bornova in the late 1880s by several young merchants from the vast colony of Westerners living in Levant, specifically of British and French nationality, such as prominent members of the wealthy Whithall and La Fontaine families residing in Izmir; in fact, in Bournabat's first-ever recorded match in 1894, the club fielded several members of those families, including the 36-year-old Herbert, who played a crucial role in helping Bournabat became the strongest team in Smyrna in the 1890s. At some point, he became the manager of Bournabat FC.

== Later life ==
Whittall married Louisa Jane Maltass, with whom he had five children Kathleen (1881–1960), Helen (1883–1906), Herbert James, Mabel (1886–?), and George. In 1906, his son Herbert was one of the five members of the Whittall family who competed in the football tournament at the 1906 Intercalated Games in Athens, winning a silver medal as a member of the Bournabat Olympic team representing Smyrna, where they achieved a silver medal.

Whittall occasionally contributed articles to The Times on the Greek occupation of Smyrna. He later joined the British community of Tunis, Tunisia, where he died on 3 February 1929, at the age of 71.
