= Football at the 1906 Intercalated Games =

Tournament details
- Host country: Greece
- City: Athens
- Dates: 23–25 April
- Teams: 4
- Venue: 1 (in 1 host city)

Final positions
- Champions: (Denmark) Copenhagen XI
- Runners-up: Smyrna XI
- Third place: (Greece) Omilos Filomouson

Tournament statistics
- Matches played: 4
- Goals scored: 23 (5.75 per match)

At the 1906 Summer Olympics in Athens (often referred to as the "Intercalated Games"), an unofficial football event was held. Only four teams competed, with three of them being clubs from Greece and the Ottoman Empire. Medal tables list the gold medalist as Denmark, with the silver medals given to a mixed team from Smyrna, and the bronze medalists from Thessaloniki listed as Greece. Both were cities in the Ottoman Empire at the time.

Denmark were awarded the gold medal after the Athens team failed to appear for the second half of the final. The Athens team were subsequently invited to play off in a three-team tournament to decide second place, but refused and were promptly ejected from the competition, leaving Smyrna and Thessaloniki to play off for the silver and bronze medals.

The Thessaloniki team composition was Greek from the group of "Friends of the Arts" (Omilos Philomuson, later Iraklis). The Smyrna (former name of Turkish city İzmir), a team consisted of English, French and Armenian players, was also part of the competition. The Danish team was a selection of players from the Copenhagen Football Association. As this competition was not an official Olympic football tournament, no national football teams participated.

All the matches were played at Podilatodromio, which was originally a velodrome.

== Venue ==
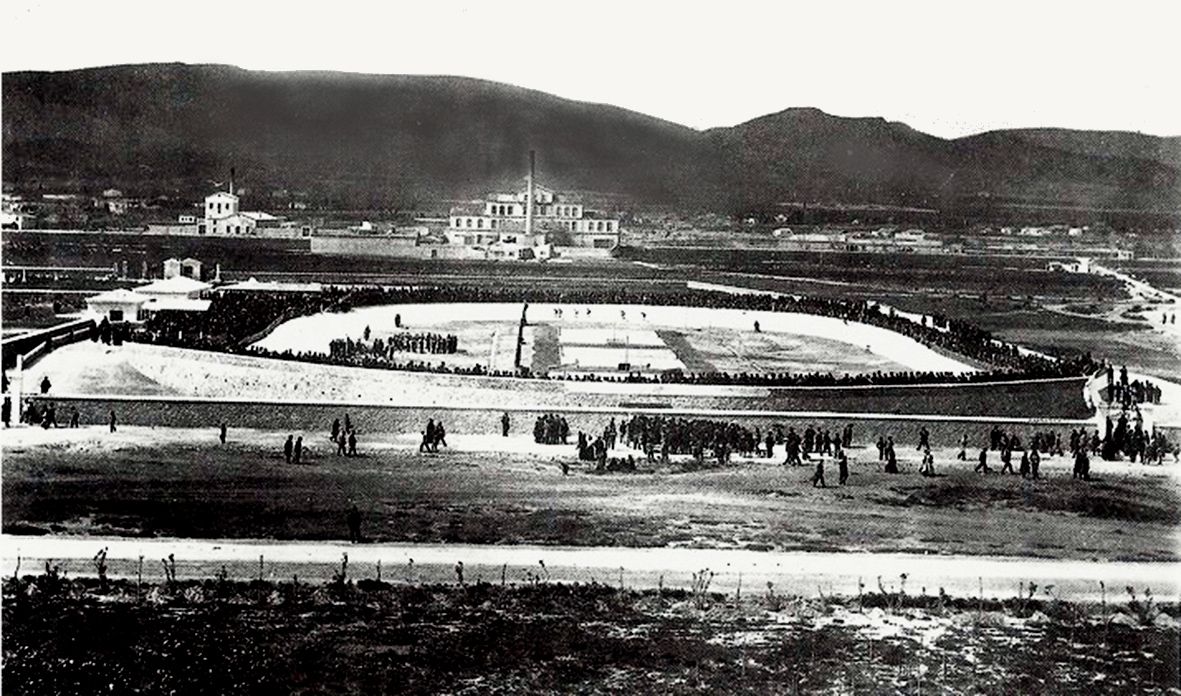
The 'Podilatodromio' in Athens, venue for the tournament, as seen in 1896

All the matches were hosted at "Neo Phaliron Velodrome" (or "Podilatodromio"), originally a velodrome and sports arena in the Neo Faliro District of Piraeus. This venue had been used for the track cycling events at the Athens 1896 Olympics also held in Athens.

This venue was then demolished to build the Karaiskakis Stadium, a football stadium with capacity for 32,000.

== Medallists ==
Medallists

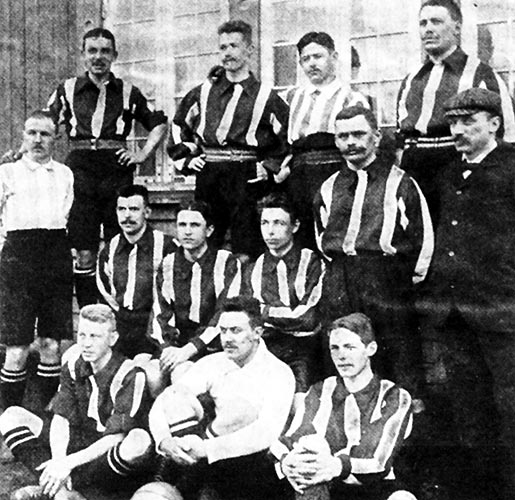
Copenhagen XI

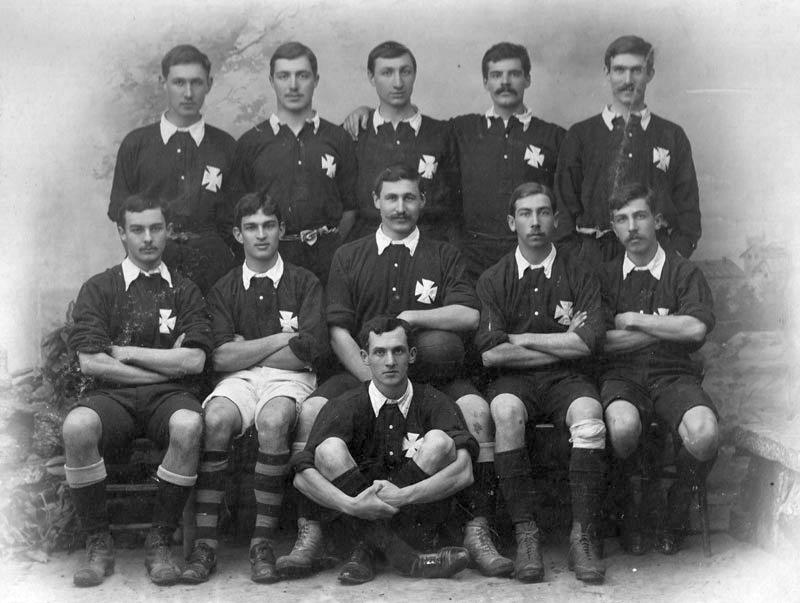
Smyrna XI

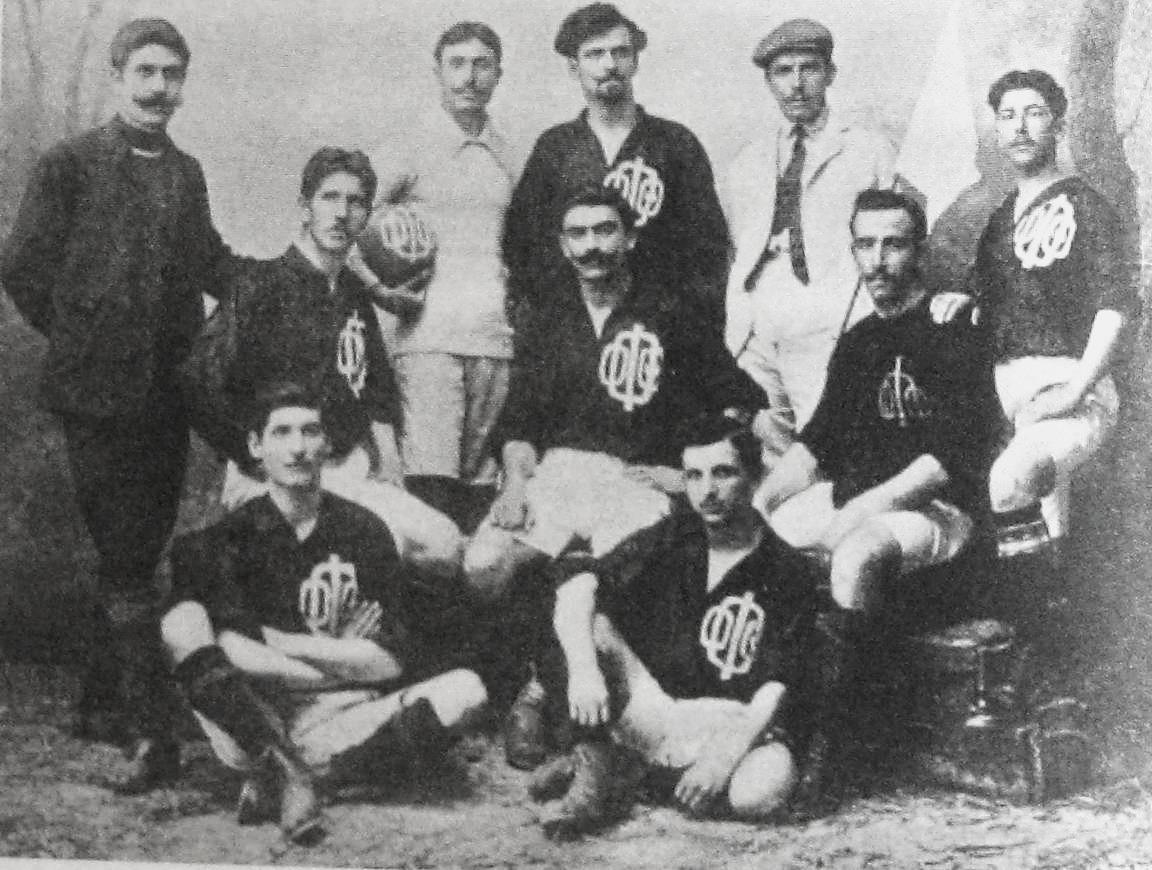
Omilos Filomouson

== Results ==
=== Semi-finals ===
23 April 1906
8:30

Ethnikos GS (Athens) (Greece)	5–0	(Greece) Omilos Filomouson
	Report

Podilatodromio, Athens
Referee: Carl Andersen (Denmark)

23 April 1906
12:00

(Denmark) Copenhagen XI	5–1	Smyrna XI
	Report

Podilatodromio, Athens
Attendance: 3000
Referee: Gösta Drake (Sweden)

=== Final ===
24 April 1906
12:00

(Denmark) Copenhagen XI	9–0 Awarded	(Greece) Ethnikos GS (Athens)
1' 7' 19' 22' 24' 26' 27' 34' 40'	Report

Podilatodromio, Athens
Referee: Gösta Drake (Sweden)

The match was abandoned at half-time and Denmark were awarded the gold medal after Ethnikos GS failed to appear for the second half.

=== Second place match ===
Following Athens' failure to appear for the second half of the final, the tournament organisers ordered Athens, Smyrna and Thessalonki to play off for second place: Athens refused, and were ejected from the competition.

25 April 1906
11:30

Smyrna XI	12–0	(Greece) Omilos Filomouson
	Report

Podilatodromio, Athens
Referee: Carl Andersen (Denmark)

== Tournament ranking ==
Pos.	Team	Pld	W	D	L	GF	GA	GD	Pts
1	Copenhagen XI; Denmark	2	2	0	0	14	1	+13	4
2	Smyrna XI; Great Britain	2	1	0	1	13	5	+8	2
3	Thessalonica; Turkey	2	0	0	2	0	17	-17	0
DSQ	Ethnikos GS; Greece	2	1	0	1	5	9	-4	2
