= Forchhammer =

Forchhammer is a surname. Notable people with the surname include:

- August Friedrich Wilhelm Forchhammer (1797–1870), Danish jurist and writer
- Bjarne Forchhammer (1903–1970), Danish actor and theatre director
- Emanuel Forchhammer (1851–1890), Swiss indologist and professor
- Henni Forchhammer (1863–1955), Danish teacher and women's rights activist
- Holger Forchhammer (1866–1946), Danish physician and sportsman
- Johan Georg Forchhammer (1794–1865), Danish mineralogist and geologist
- Johannes Nicolai Georg Forchhammer (1827–1909), Danish philologist
- Johannes Georg Forchhammer (1861–1938), Danish physicist and educator
- Lukas Forchhammer (born 1988), Danish singer, songwriter, actor, and frontman of Lukas Graham
- Peter Wilhelm Forchhammer (1801–1894), German archaeologist
- Sigurd Forchhammer (1906–1981), Danish sculptor
