= Victor Hansen =

Victor Hansen may refer to:

- Victor Hansen (author) (1837–1912), Danish counter admiral, author, and football executive
- Victor Georg Hansen (1899–1974), Danish jurist, entomologist and tennis player
- Victor M. Hansen (fl. 2005–present), American lawyer and military officer

== See also ==
- Victor Hanson (disambiguation)
