= Johan L. Nathansen =

Danish football executive (1870–1922)

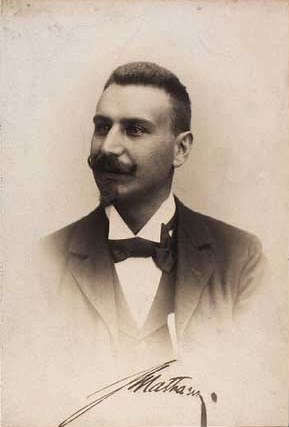
- Johan Ludvig Nathansen

5th President of Danish Olympic Committee
- In office 1909–1922
- Preceded by: Fritz Hansen
- Succeeded by: Holten F. Castenschiold
- Born: Johan Ludvig Nathansen; 5 April 1870; Copenhagen, Denmark
- Died: 24 April 1922 (aged 52); Frederiksberg, Denmark
- Resting place: Frederiksberg Ældre Kirkegård
- Citizenship: Danish
- Occupations: Football executive; Advokat
- Known for: 5th President of Danish Olympic Committee

Johan Ludvig Nathansen (5 April 1870 – 24 April 1922) was a Danish Advokat and football executive, who was the fifth chairman of the Danish Olympic Committee from 1909 to 1922. He also established the Danish Swimming and Lifesaving Association in 1907 and was a co-founder of the Danish Fencing Association in the same year. He was also temporarily chairman of the Danish Athletics Federation. Nathansen possessed unusual organizational skills and financial insight. DIF grew under his leadership both in scope and strength.

== Early life ==
Johan Ludvig Nathansen was born on 5 April 1870 as the son of Moritz Nathansen, an editor at Berlingske, a Danish national daily newspaper based in Copenhagen. In 1887 he became a student at the Metropolitanskolen, took the examen artium in 1892 and became a superior court prosecutor in 1897; he then carried on an extensive law practice until his death. Although his daily work thus came to lie within the law, there is no doubt that his most important interest remained in sports.

== Sporting career ==
He was personally a keen sportsman, and when he was an employee at Berlingske Tidende for a few years, he was involved in, among other things, with sports journalism. Later, he mainly worked as an organizer and manager of various sports companies and associations, within which from time to time he assumed innumerable positions of trust. As a result, he was a board member of the Danish Gymnastics Association (1901–07), a chairman of the Danish Athletics Association (1903–05), of the Amateur and Order Committee (1902–08). In 1907 he founded the Danish Swimming and Lifesaving Association and was also co-founder of the Danish Fencing Association later that year. Moreover, he was also a chairman of the Danish Sports Association (1909–22), and the co-founder of the sports brand in 1921.

His activities were thus exceedingly extensive. At the beginning of the century, Danish sports, and especially its organization were in their infancy, and therefore most were wavering and uncertain when faced with significant questions regarding the organization and course of sports, but Nathansen's work played a crucial role in establishing most of this sporting associations. He had unusual organizational skills, considerable financial insight, a clear overview of and a burning interest in sports in the belief of its importance for the physical and mental development of young people. It was mainly through his efforts that the guidelines that became applicable to law enforcement and amateurs in the coming years were established. His efforts were also significant in the introduction of medical supervision of sportsmen, and the creation of the Kbh.'s sports park, which is so important for the capital's sports, including the building of the Sports House, all with a capital investment of more than half a million. DKK, is largely due to his initiative. As chairman of the Danish Sports Confederation, his most important sporting position, Nathansen stood as the unifying brand in a time when many opinions were divided. He understood how to separate politics from the sporting matter and other interests that would damage unity and counteract the purpose: through sports to build bridges between the social classes for the benefit of the whole society. Under his leadership, the association grew in scope and strength, and its finances were secured to a point that all Danish sports, with the exception of the shooting and gymnastics associations, were affiliated with the Danish Sports Confederation at his death.

== Personal life ==
Nathansen married for the first time on 11 May 1899 with Ingeborg Heine (1874–1937) in Zürich, and had two children, Nathan and Mathilde. He married for the second time on 20 December 1909 with Ebba Elna Christine Bollé (1873–1962). He died on 24 April 1922, aged 52. He is buried at Frederiksberg Ældre Kirkegård, but the burial site has been closed.
