= Henni Forchhammer =

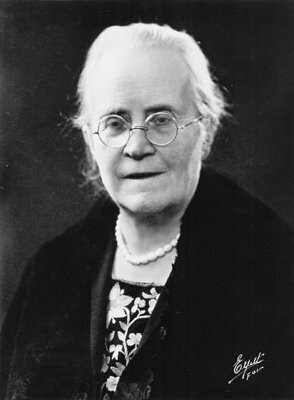
Henni Forchhammer Photo by Peter Elfelt

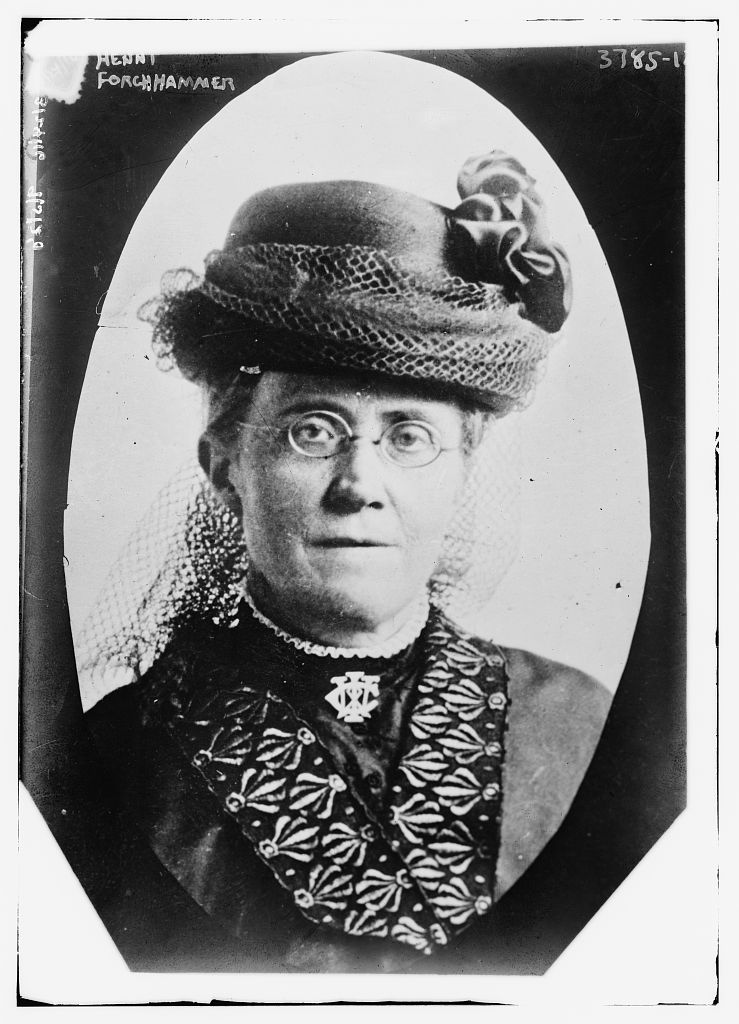
Henni Forchhammer circa 1915

Henriette "Henni" Forchhammer (1863–1955), also known as Margarete Forchhammer, was a Danish educator, feminist and peace activist.

== Biography ==
She was born in 1863 to Johannes Nicolai Georg Forchhammer, a sister of physicist and educator Georg Forchhammer and singer Viggo Forchhammer and aunt of theatre director Bjarne Forchhammer. She was a granddaughter of Johan Georg Forchhammer and grandniece of August Friedrich Wilhelm Forchhammer.

In 1899 she was a co-founder of Danske Kvinders Nationalråd, and she was also a board member from the start. She chaired the organization from 1913 to 1931. She also co-founded the Women's International League for Peace and Freedom in 1915, and was vice president of the International Council of Women from 1914 to 1930. From 1920 to 1937 she was a delegate to the League of Nations. During a convention of the League in Geneva in 1922, where the topic of Esperanto as the international language was being discussed, Henni argued that Ido should be chosen instead – her brother Georg was an Idist.

She died in 1955.

== See also ==
- List of peace activists
