= National Olympic Committee and Sports Confederation of Denmark =

National Olympic Committee

- Country: Denmark
- [[|]]
- Code: DEN
- Created: 14 February 1896
- Recognized: 1905
- Continental Association: EOC
- Headquarters: Brøndby, Denmark
- President: Hans Natorp
- Secretary General: Morten Mølholm Hansen
- Website: www.dif.dk

The National Olympic Committee and Sports Confederation of Denmark (Danish: Danmarks Idrætsforbund, DIF; IOC Code: DEN) is the National Olympic Committee representing Denmark.

The organization as it exists today was formed in 1993 by the merger of the Dansk Idræts-Forbund (Danish Sports Confederation) and Danmarks Olympiske Komité (Danish Olympic Committee).

== History ==
=== Danish Sports Confederation ===
The confederation was founded on 14 February 1896 as Dansk Idræts-Forbund. At the time it was founded, it represented 18 associations across ten different sports with 2,180 individual members. After the Danish Gymnastics Federation (Dansk Gymnastik Forbund) and the Danish Football Association became members in 1904, the confederation began to expand dramatically. By 1918, it represented more than 400 associations with approximately 60,000 members. Initially the confederation was not recognized by the state. It first received state-funding in 1903, when it was awarded an annual grant of 3,000 DKK.

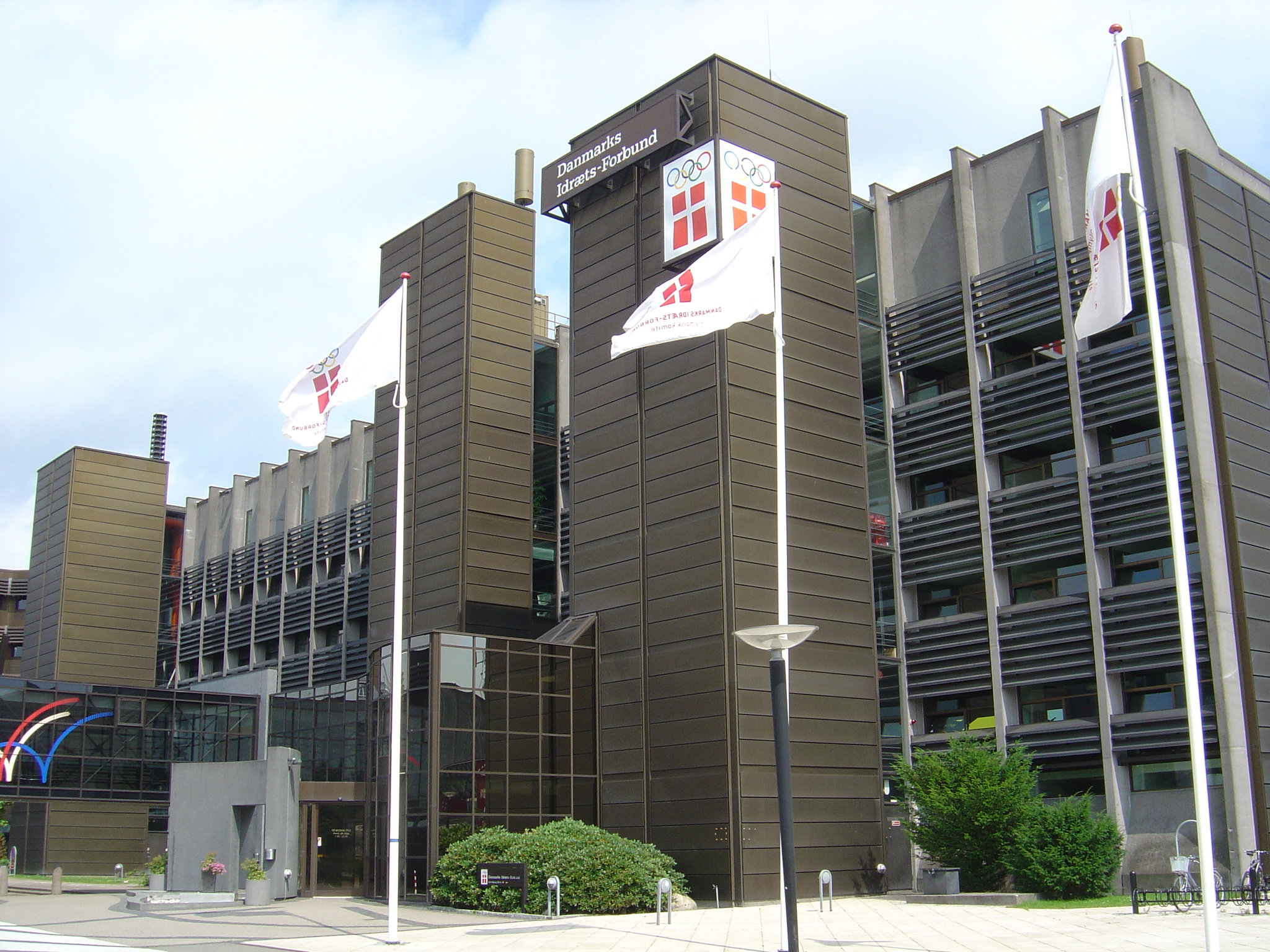
DIF's headquarters at Idrættens Hus.

The confederation's headquarters were initially located on Ingemannsvej in Frederiksberg. Its location changed many times in the following years until it moved to Østerbro in 1925. In 1957 the confederation purchased its own building from a carpet wholesaler—a location which it occupied until 1973. In 1970, plans to construct a purpose-built headquarters for the confederation were drawn up. The building was designed by architects Tarquini Mårtensson and Mikael Tarp Jensen and completed in Brøndby in 1974. The building has become known as Idrættens Hus (lit. House of Sports) and remains the organization's headquarters to this day. A number of related organizations are housed within the building as well, including Team Danmark and Anti-Doping Denmark.

=== Denmark's Olympic Committee ===
Denmark's Olympic Committee was established in 1905. In 1912, it took over the confederation's organisational responsibilities for the Olympic games. In 1993 the two independent organizations were again merged. As a result of the merger, the combined organization became known as Danmarks Idrætsforbund.

== List of presidents ==
The following is a list of presidents since its creation in 1896.

President	Term
Victor Hansen	1896–1897
Holger Forchhammer	1897–1899
Niels V. Holbek	1899–1901
Fritz Hansen	1901–1909
Johan L. Nathansen	1909–1922
Holten F. Castenschiold	1922–1941
Herbert Sander	1941–1947
Leo Frederiksen	1947–1962
Gudmund Schack	1962–1969
Kurt Møller	1969–1978
Svend O. Hansen	1978–1983
Kai Holm	1983–2007
Niels Nygaard	2007–2021
Hans Natorp	2021–present

== Member federations ==
The Danish National Federations are the organizations that coordinate all aspects of their individual sports. They are responsible for training, competition and development of their sports. There are currently 32 Olympic Summer and 4 Winter Sport Federations in Denmark.

National Federation	Summer or Winter	Headquarters
Danish Archery Association	Summer	Brøndby
Danish Athletics Federation	Summer	Brøndby
Danish Badminton Federation	Summer	Brøndby
Danish Basketball Federation	Summer	Brøndby
Danish Boxing Association	Summer	Brøndby
Danish Canoe Federation	Summer	Brøndby
Danish Curling Federation	Winter	Brøndby
Danish Cycling Federation	Summer	Brøndby
Danish Sports Diving Federation	Summer	Brøndby
Danish Equestrian Federation	Summer	Brøndby
Danish Fencing Federation	Summer	Copenhagen
Danish Football Association	Summer	Brøndby
Danish Golf Union	Summer	Brøndby
Danish Gymnastics Federation	Summer	Brøndby
Danish Handball Federation	Summer	Brøndby
Danish Hockey Federation	Summer	Brøndby
Danish Ice Hockey Union	Winter	Brøndby
Danish Judo and Ju-jitsu Federation	Summer	Brøndby
Danish Karate Federation	Summer	Brøndby
Danish Modern Pentathlon Association	Summer	Nexø
Danish Rollerskating Union	Summer	Brøndby
Danish Rowing Federation	Summer	Bagsværd
Danish Rugby Federation	Summer	Brøndby
Danish Sailing Association	Summer	Brøndby
Danish Shooting Union	Summer	Brøndby
Danish Skating Federation	Winter	Brøndby
Danish Ski Federation	Winter	Copenhagen
Danish Softball Federation	Summer	Brøndby
Danish Swimming Federation	Summer	Brøndby
Danish Table Tennis Association	Summer	Brøndby
Danish Taekwondo Federation	Summer	Højbjerg
Danish Tennis Federation	Summer	Brøndby
Danish Triathlon Federation	Summer	Brøndby
Danish Volleyball Federation	Summer	Brøndby
Danish Weightlifting Federation	Summer	Brøndby
Danish Wrestling Federation	Summer	Brøndby

== See also ==
- Denmark at the Olympics
