= Georg Forchhammer =

Danish deaf and mute educator (1861-1938)

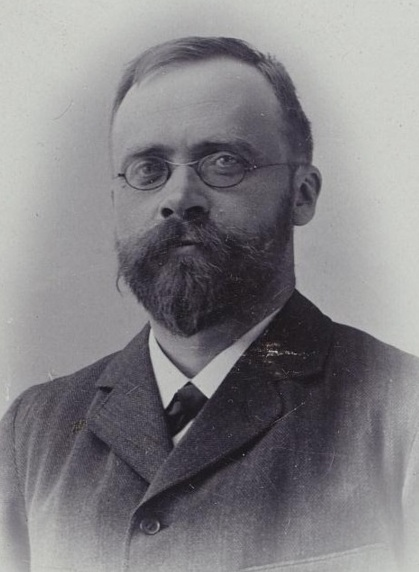
- Forchhammer in 1910
- Born: Johannes Georg Forchhammer; 22 May 1861; Aalborg, North Jutland County, Denmark
- Died: 23 July 1938 (aged 77); Ordrup, Copenhagen County, Denmark
- Education: University of Copenhagen
- Occupation: Deaf educator
- Spouse: Karen Marie Groth (m. 1888; died 1920)
- Children: 1
- Father: Johannes Forchhammer
- Relatives: Forchhammer family

Johannes Georg Forchhammer (22 May 1861 – 23 July 1938) was a Danish educator of the deaf, who was director of several deaf schools in Nyborg and Fredericia from 1891 to 1926. Born to a family of academics, in Aalborg, first training as a chemist, he taught physics for several years before starting work as a deaf educator. Forchhammer developed one of the first mouth–hand systems, an approach to manually coded languages, which he used to teach the Danish language to deaf students; his system was used through the twentieth century, and was later adapted to teach German. The system used a series of handshapes under the chin to show the sounds of speech as one spoke, giving the observer extra information about pronunciation.

Forchhammer conducted research in linguistics, and created a theory of vocal intensity. He was inventor of the phonoscope, a device which was used to demonstrate to deaf students whether the vowel they were making was correct using a gas flame and rotating drum. In 1903, he completed a doctorate degree on the subject of deaf communication, and was a supporter of various constructed languages, running a society for one, Ido, in Copenhagen. Forchhammer had one son, Eiler, who also became an educator of the deaf.

== Family ==
Georg Forchhammer was a member of the Forchhammer family, a Danish bourgeoisie and academic family with roots in Southern Germany; Sebald Forchhammer, who had family originating in Forchheim, Bavaria, was a goldsmith in Kiel around 1640. The family had a presence in and around Denmark by Sebald's great-grandson, Thomas Forchhammer, a parish priest in Rabenkirchen, Schleswig-Holstein, who died in 1771; his son, Johann Ludolph Forchhammer, was, like Georg, a pedagogist, founding multiple schools and colleges in the state.

Johann Ludolph had seven children with his wife, publisher Margaretha Elisabeth, including Johan Georg, August, and Peter. Johan Georg was Georg's grandfather; Georg was born to philologist and educator Johannes Nicolai Forchhammer and his wife Abigail Ebbesen on 22 May 1861 in Aalborg. He was one of thirteen children, his siblings including:

- Henni Forchhammer
- Holger Forchhammer
- Ejnar Forchhammer
- Johannes Forchhammer
- Jørgen Forchhammer
- Herluf Forchhammer
- Viggo Forchhammer
- Olaf Forchhammer

== Career ==
Forchhammer finished secondary education at Herlufsholm School in 1879, taking a polytechnic examination in Chemistry on 29 January 1885, from which he gained a first grade (1ste Kar.) degree and the title cand.poly. From 1 September 1885 to 1 August 1886, Forchhammer worked as an assistant at the Carlsberg Laboratory, before working as a physics teacher; he was a part–time teacher (Danish: timelærer) at the Metropolitan School from 1886 to 1891, and taught at the Royal Danish Naval Academy from 1888 to 1891. While teaching physics, he wrote two school textbooks with Julius Petersen: Mekanisk Fysik (1888) and Astronomi (1898). In 1903, Forchhammer completed a Doctor of Philosophy degree at the University of Copenhagen, defending his thesis "On the Necessity of Safe Means of Communication in Deaf-Mute Education. With a Look Back at their own Previous Work" (Om Nødvendigheden af sikre Meddelelsesmidler i Døvstummeundervisningen. Med Tilbageblik paa egne tidligere Arbejder) on 27 June of that year to a panel including Drs Kristian Kroman and Otto Jespersen; he was awarded the degree on 11 July 1903.

Tegnsproget er et uudviklet sprog. Og den döve verden, som staar saa langt tilbage for den horende, vil aldrig kunne udvikle tegnsproget til folkesprogenes höjde. De döves udvikling er betinget af den fyldigst mulige tilegnelse af landets sprog i sznlig skikkelse.

Sign language is an undeveloped language. And the deaf world, which is so far behind the hearing world, will never be able to develop sign language to the level of the vernacular. The development of the deaf is conditioned by the fullest possible acquisition of the country's language in a meaningful form.

— Georg Forchhammer, 1916.

When the Keller speaking school moved from Copenhagen to Nyborg, Forchhammer became its first headmaster on 1 April 1891. The school's teaching was based on the principle of oralism; when it opened, it had 175 pupils. He taught there until 1909, when he applied to the Royal Institute for the Deaf-Mute in Fredericia (Det kongelige Døvstummeinstitut i Fredericia); he taught there until his retirement in 1926. In 1908, Forchhammer established an agricultural high school in Fredericia. At the school in Nyborg, students lived with families in the town, to prevent them from signing in the school dormitories – at the time, use of sign language was considered negative in Danish deaf education; his later mouth-hand system afforded a freer style of education to deaf students, and a form of communication less strenuous than speech.

Forchhammer advocated an imitative style of language teaching, which lent less importance to pronunciation in speech production. He gave students written language before introducing speech, which had the effect of improving understanding of language, but reduced students' ability to express themselves.

== Other work ==
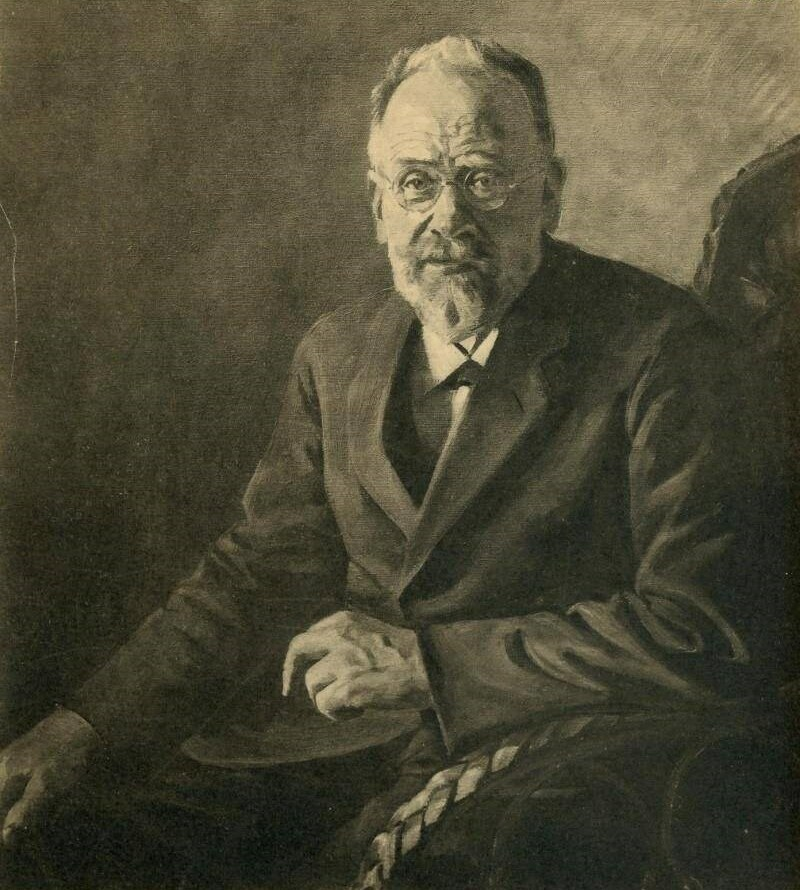
Forchhammer, pictured in 1920

Forchhammer was a phonetician, constructing a three-dimensional vowel chart with axes of tongue height, roundedness, and place of articulation. He developed a theory regarding vowel stress, which rejected the notion that vowel stress was a result of a lower expirative force, and instead a result of a difference in closure of the vocal cords – while in singing, vocal intensity was primarily determined by the expirative muscles, in speech, unstressed vowels came from a laxer constriction of the vocal cords and a greater airflow. In 1896, he ran a course teaching phonetics to other teachers of the deaf, working with Jespersen.

In 1903, Forchhammer created a manually coded language (a signed representation of phonetic speech) to help students learn Danish, which he named the Mund-Hand System. It used fourteen handforms located under the chin, representing Danish consonants, although there was not a one-to-once correspondence between handforms and individual consonants (one handform was used for the consonants b and v, and all vowels). Several handforms were derived from Danish Sign Language. The aim of the system was to provide visual aid in determining lipreading, giving the observer information about voice and nasalization in the flow of speech; the system did not show orthography, but instead pronunciation of words. The system was used for much of the twentieth century, and although not adopted in other Scandinavian countries, was modified for use with German in 1923. As of 2010, the system had continued use to convey meaning when there is no individual sign for a concept. The system benefitted articulation training, but did not greatly improve lipreading; deaf speakers using the system have a tendency towards speaking abnormally slowly.

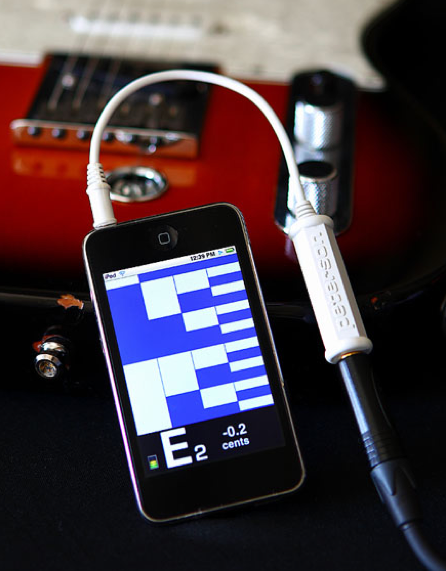
A modern digital strobe tuner

He was the inventor of the phonoscope, a device similar to the stroboscope, which used a gas flame and rotating drum. His device was created in 1885, and was used to demonstrate to deaf students whether the vowel they were making was correct, or whether the pitch they were singing was in tune. Around the edge of the drum were printed 21 "scales" or rows of black squares – the squares were spaced equidistantly around the drum, with the number of squares per line increasing up the drum. As a pupil sang into the device, a flickering gas flame inside would be affected by the vibrations, increasing or decreasing in size. This created a stroboscopic effect, and the rows of squares would appear to slow or change direction: using this, a student could tell whether the pitch they were producing was in tune.

Forchhammer was a supporter of the abstinence movement, as well as international auxiliary languages; he supported several of these languages, including Esperanto, Ido, Novial (by Jespersen), and Occidental (by Edgar de Wahl). In a 1935 report from the Occidental-language magazine Cosmoglotta by Ilmari Federn, Forchhammer stated that he considered Occidental and Novial to be different dialects of the same language, "Jewahli", and considered himself a "Jewahlist": He found Novial grammar to be more regular and easy to memorise, but preferred de Wahl's handling of the genitive case. In 1910, he was president of the Internaciona Linguo Klubo, an Ido-language association based in Copenhagen. Forchhammer's sister Henni was also a supporter of international languages - being a Danish delegate to the League of Nations, she was present in debates concerning such languages, and was the only person in these forums to argue for a constructed language other than Esperanto.

== Personal life ==
Forchhammer was married to Karen Marie Groth, the daughter of captain lieutenant Eiler Peter Christopher Munthe Groth, on 15 May 1888; their son, Eiler, was born in 1890. Like his father, Eiler was educated at Herlufsholm and became an educator of the deaf, later teaching at the deaf schools in Nyborg and Fredericia. Karen Groth died in 1920, with Forchhammer dying on 23 July 1938 in Ordrup.

== Bibliography ==
- Forchhammer, Georg; Petersen, Julius (1888). Mekanisk Physik [Mechanical Physics]. OCLC 822880260.
- ————; ———— (1889). Astronomi [Astronomy]. OCLC 493776408.
- ———— (1894). Bidrag til Bedømmelse af Talemetoden for Døvstumme, baseret paa Udtalelser fra Præster og Forældre [Contribution to the evaluation of the speech method for deaf mutes, based on statements from priests and parents]. OCLC 476215354.
- ———— (1898). Udkast til en dansk artikulationslære [Draft for a Danish articulation theory]. OCLC 61072782.
- ———— (1900). Exposé des principes de l'articulation [Exposé on the principles of articulation]. OCLC 14799087.
- ———— (1903). Om nödvendigheden af sikre meddelelsesmidler i dövstummeundervisningen [On the Necessity of Safe Means of Communication in Deaf-Mute Education]. J. Frimodt. OCLC 457282014.
- ———— (1916). Hjælpetegn til sikker Aflæsning [Tips for safe reading]. OCLC 61004617.
- ———— (1916). Ledetraad i eksperimentel Fonetik : Med særlig Henblik paa Undervisningskurset paa Det kgl. Døvstummeinstitut i Fredericia [Guidelines in experimental phonetics: With particular reference to the teaching course at the Royal Deaf and mute institute in Fredericia]. OCLC 61072780.
- ———— (1916). Den danske Retskrivning : en Hovedvanskelighed for Læse-Undervisningen med døve og hørende [The Danish Spelling: a main difficulty for Reading Teaching with the deaf and hard of hearing]. OCLC 475170951.
- ———— (1916). Mundaflæsning og Mundhaandsystem [Mouth reading and mouth hand system]. OCLC 472176917.
- ———— (1916). Pro quo a Quale? Diserturi pri surdala instrukteso [Why and how? Discussions on deaf instruction]. OCLC 465918699.
- ———— (1917). Vejledning i Mundhaandsystemet og tydelig Tale for Forældre med døve Børn, tilligemed Oversigt over Undervisningen i de lavere Klasser [Guidance in the oral-hand system and clear speech for parents with deaf children, as well as an overview of the teaching in the lower classes]. OCLC 465918704.
- ———— (1922). Lærebog i Aflæsning med Vejledning i at tale til døve [Textbook in narrated guided reading to the deaf]. OCLC 467584704.
- ———— (1930). Taubstummenpädagogische Abhandlungen [Deaf-mute educational treatises]. OCLC 11373964.
- ———— (1932). Den økonomiske Krise. Ansvar og Udveje. En populær Vejledning i Retsmoralens økonomiske Værdi [The financial crisis. Responsibilities and Remedies. A popular guide to the economic value of legal ethics]. OCLC 872013381.
- ———— (1934). Kampen mod dragen : en naturreligiøs livs- og verdensbetragtning [The fight against the dragon : a natural religious view of life and the world]. OCLC 488444181.
