= Harald Hilarius-Kalkau =

Danish football executive (1852–1924)

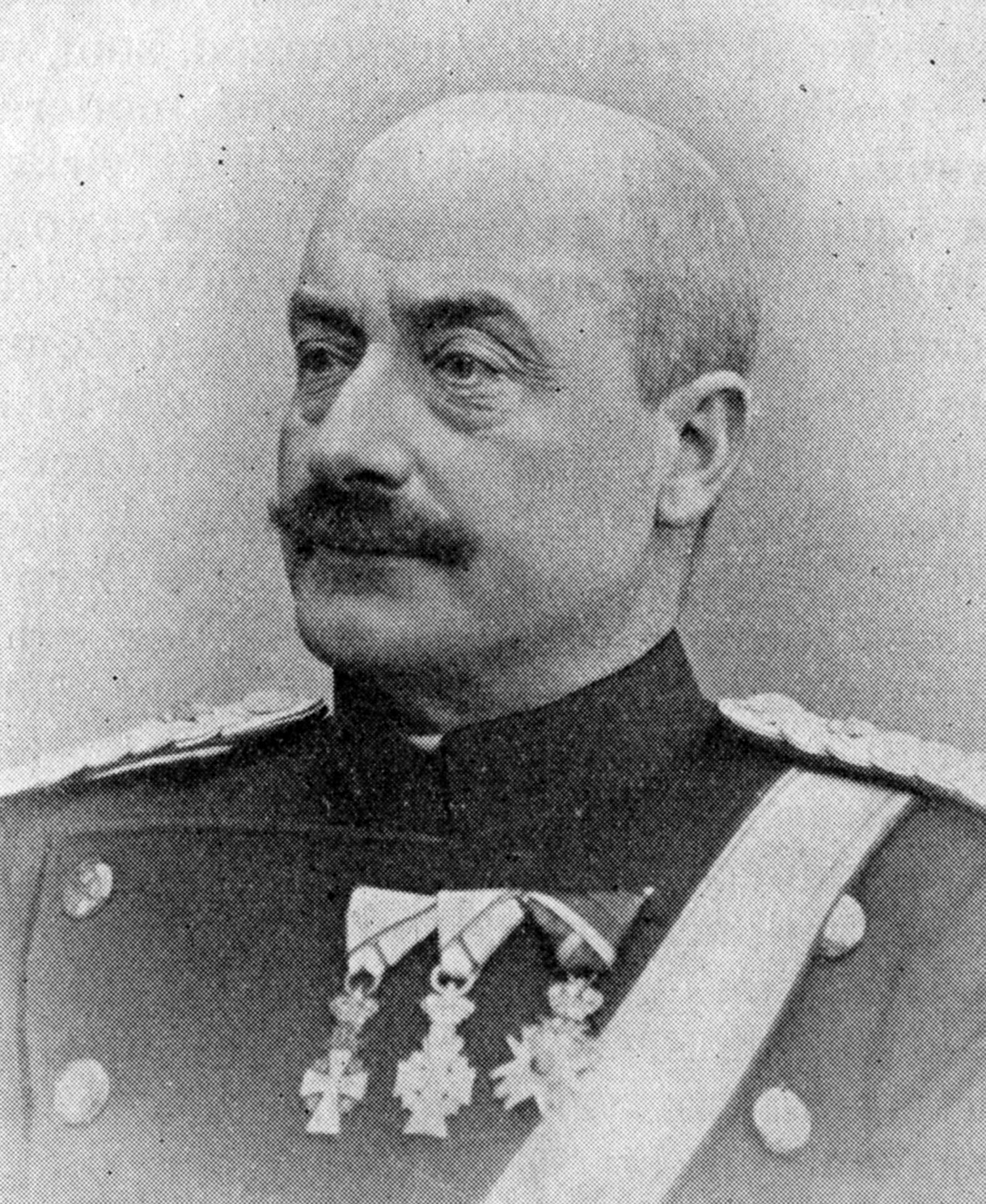
- Harald Hilarius-Kalkau

2nd President of Danish Football Association
- In office 1890–1894
- Preceded by: Frederik Markmann
- Succeeded by: Johannes Forchhammer

Personal details
- Born: Harald Axel Hilarius-Kalkau; 21 October 1852 Copenhagen, Denmark
- Died: 13 January 1924 (aged 71) Vejle, Denmark
- Citizenship: Danish
- Occupation: Football executive
- Known for: 2nd President of Danish Football Association

Harald Axel Hilarius-Kalkau (21 October 1852 – 13 January 1924) was a Danish military officer and sportsman, who was the second chairman of the Danish Football Association from 1890 to 1894.

== Early life and education ==
Harald Hilarius-Kalkau was born on 21 October 1852 at Rosengården near Ringsted as the son of Johan Frederik Hilarius-Kalkau (1809–1878), a proprietor, and Karen Margrethe Hansen (1816–1856). From 1862 he attended Sorø Academy, from which he graduated in 1871.

== Official career ==
He became a second lieutenant in the infantry in 1874, a student in the second-oldest class of the Royal Danish Military Academy (Danish: Hærens Officersskole) in 1876, a first lieutenant in 1878, was adjutant at the 18th battalion in 1883–86.

On 6 February 1889, he was appointed captain and company commander at the 23rd Battalion in Copenhagen. He was the commander of the Army's Gymnastic School from 1892 to 1902, became lieutenant colonel in 1902, was the first commander of the 15th battalion in Copenhagen in 1902–03 and then commander of the 12th battalion in Fredericia from 1903 to 1912, where he finally retired.

The military conditions were favorable and Hilarius-Kalkau quickly was appointed commander of his battalion. On the horse rides and strolls on the rampart, in the Kastellet and the nearby forests, he could, as he put it, "leaf through nature's great picture book". He showed a strong interest in the work of his superiors and at times assisted in guiding junior officers, occasionally using a sarcastic tone. He was thus able to arouse the young officers' interest and desire for their work and gentlemanly behavior, where he himself was a distinguished role model.

Thanks to his long and distinguished military career, Hilarius-Kalkau had numerous awards bestowed on him by governments, organizations, and associations, such as the Order of the Dannebrog on 24 February 1896, Man of Dannebrog on 12 March 1902 and was a Knight of the Order of St. Olav.

== Sportsman ==
Throughout his life, Hilarius-Kalkau always showed a lot of interest in sports and ball games. Already as a student at Sorø Academy, he had become a masterful cricket player, and he was particularly interested in English sports, and hence playing football for Kjøbenhavns Boldklub (KB). In 1906, the Fredericia Kricket Club was formed on his initiative. A sports ground with a ball house was then provided at the end of 1906, and soon the Fredericia cricketers became dangerous competitors for even the cultured Copenhagen cricketers.

Hilarius-Kalkau was chairman of the Danish Football Association from 1890 to 1894, chairman of the Danish Hockey Federation from 1908 to 1919, and chairman of the Committee for Danish School Children's Joint Games from 1912 until his death in 1924.

He succeeded in arousing a strong interest in sports and exercise among both military and civilian citizens. He became very important for military sports because he added ball games (football, cricket, hockey, handball) to the repertoire at the Gymnastic School. In 1894, he and a team of students from the Gymnastic School visited the British military training school in Aldershot near London, where his students made Denmark proud. He was also recognized as a keen hunter and an excellent ornithologist.

== Later life ==
On 4 July 1879, in the Church of Our Lady in Copenhagen, he married Vilhelmine Magdalene Verdier (26 May 1856 – 26 April 1917), the daughter of glove manufacturer André Paul Verdier (1821–1880) and Nielsine Christiane Petersen (1830–1908). His daughter Ebba married lawyer and football player Charles Buchwald.

Hilarius-Kalkau died on 13 January 1924 of a heart attack. He was buried at Bispebjerg Cemetery, but later moved to Garrison Cemetery. The burial site is now closed.
