= Victor Hanson =

Victor Hanson may refer to:

- Vic Hanson (1903–1982), American college athlete and coach
- Victor Davis Hanson (born 1953), American classicist, military historian and political commentator
- Victor Henry Hanson (1876–1945), American publisher

== See also ==
- Victor Hansen (disambiguation)
