= Leo Frederiksen =

Danish football executive (1894–1969)

8th President of Danish Football Association
- In office 1940–1948
- Preceded by: Kristian Middelboe
- Succeeded by: Kristian Middelboe

8th President of Danish Sports Confederation
- In office 1947–1962
- Preceded by: Herbert Sander
- Succeeded by: Gudmund Schack
- Born: Leo Frederiksen; 30 August 1894; Nakskov, Denmark
- Died: 3 November 1969 (aged 75); Hellerup, Denmark
- Resting place: Mariebjerg Cemetery
- Citizenship: Danish
- Occupations: Football player; Sports executive; Lawyer
- Known for: Founder of FC Zürich, FC Barcelona, Player at FC Basel

Leo Frederiksen (30 August 1894 – 3 November 1969) was a Danish lawyer, football player and sports executive, who was the 8th chairman of both the Danish Football Association (DBU) from 1940 to 1948 and of the Danish Sports Confederation (DIF) from 1947 to 1962. He was also the chairman of Denmark's Olympic Committee from 1957 to 1969. He saw participation in the Olympics as more important than victory.

== Official career ==
Leo Frederiksen was born on 30 August 1894 as the son of an editor. He received private tuition and became a student in 1912, studying law at the University of Copenhagen, graduated in 1919, and became a lawyer (district court litigator or prosecutor) with the right to sit before the Supreme Court in 1923.

== Sporting career ==
As a young man, Frederiksen was an active football player in Akademisk Boldklub, where he was a big and heavy defender, helping the club win the Danish championship in 1919. He then became a member of the club's board, and later of the DBU Copenhagen, where he served as chairman from 1926 to 1931, before also serving as a chairman of the Danish Football Association (DBU) from 1940 to 1948, being a skilled manager and negotiator and therefore he eventually become the chairman of the Danish Sports Confederation (DIF). He held that position for 15 years and one of the first tasks of district court prosecutor Leo Frederiksen was to contribute to the introduction of the Tips service. He led a demonstration with approx. 20,000 participants, who went from the Sports Park to Christiansborg to support the cause, was for 21 years vice-chairman of the tip service's board. From 1957 to 1965, Frederiksen was chairman of Denmark's Olympic Committee, was a supporter of the Olympiad's original idea that participation was more important than victory, and was strongly dissatisfied with the commercialization of sports and the competitive hysteria that surrounded the international events, so rather that the amateur work in the small clubs was promoted, had as its motto "sport for all of all". Became a Knight of Dannebrog in 1939, Dannebrogsman in 1948 and was honored as Denmark's Sports Confederation's first honorary president upon his departure in 1962.
