= William Dittmar =

William Dittmar (1833 – 1892) was a German-born scientist renowned as a chemical analyst. He was based largely in Scotland. He did much analytical work on the findings from the Challenger expedition.

He was the first to confirm the Principle of Constant Proportions, a theory first conjectured in 1865 by Johan Georg Forchhammer regarding the major ions of sea-water: that whilst salinity varied across the oceans, the ratios of ionic abundance remained constant. As a result, this principle is often called "Dittmar's Principle" or "Forchhammer's Principle".
His research also included calculations of the atomic weight of platinum, and the examination of hydrates, carbonates and peroxides of the alkali metals.

== Life ==
He was born in Umstadt near Darmstadt in western Germany on 14/15 April 1833, the second son of Fritz Dittmar, an assessor at Umstadt. In 1848 he was apprenticed as a pharmacist at the Hof Apotheker in Darmstadt. He passed the "Gehülfe Examen" with distinction, then went to Mühlhausen where he worked for several years as an assistant. He then returned to Darmstadt and passed the "Staats Examen" in pharmacy with distinction.

In 1857, he went to work in Bunsen laboratory in Heidelberg, and his focus changed to chemical analysis. There he met Henry Enfield Roscoe who brought him back to Britain with him to work as his private assistant. When Roscoe was appointed professor of chemistry at Owen's College in Manchester, Dittmar became his assistant within the college.

In 1861 he received a post as chief laboratory assistant in the chemistry department of the university of Edinburgh under Lord Playfair, and stayed there until 1869.

In 1863, he was elected a Fellow of the Royal Society of Edinburgh, his Proposer being Lord Playfair. He served as a Councillor to the Society 1868–1869. In 1882 he was also elected a Fellow of the Royal Society of London.

In 1869, he took a break from the UK and returned to Germany, and worked as a privatdocent then as a lecturer in meteorology at the local Agricultural College in the Poppelsdorf district of Bonn. In 1872 he declined the Chair of Chemistry at the Polytechnic school of Kassel (that school opened in 1832 as the first polytechnic institute in Germany, but in 1866 it missed the opportunity of developing into a technical university), instead wishing to await for a post back in the United Kingdom. In 1873 he returned to Owen's College as a lecturer. In 1874 he moved to the Andersonian college in Glasgow, now part of the University of Strathclyde, where he succeeded T. Edward Thorpe (who was leaving for the Yorkshire college in Leeds) as professor of chemistry, a post he then held until his death.

He died suddenly at home, 11 Hillhead Street in Hillhead, Glasgow on 9 February 1892, shortly after returning from giving his morning lecture. His obituary in the Royal Society of Edinburgh was written and delivered by Alexander Crum Brown.

== Honours ==
The university of Glasgow gave him the degree of Legum Doctor (LL.D.) in 1887. In 1891 he received the Graham medal from the Philosophical Society of Glasgow for his work on the qualitative composition of water.

== Publications ==
- Dittmar (1876) [1874]. A Manual of qualitative Chemical Analysis. Edinburgh: Edmonston and Douglas.
- Dittmar (1884). "Report on researches into the composition of ocean water collected by H.M.S. Challenger during the years 1873-1876". Report on the Scientific Results of the Voyage of H.M.S. Challenger During the Years 1873-76. Physics and Chemistry. 1, part 1-3: 1–247 + index & 3 plates.
- "On the composition of ocean water". Proceedings of the Glasgow Philosophical Society of Glasgow (read on December 3, 1884). 16: 47–73. 1885.

== Family ==
Dittmar's son, also William Dittmar (1859–1951) came with him to Britain and is thought to have also been a chemist.

== Bibliography ==
- Maclagan, Douglas (chairman of the Royal Society of Edinburg) (1893). "Obituary, in Chairman's opening address". Proceedings of the Royal Society of Edinburgh (read December 5, 1892, 110th session). 20: 8–9.
- Brown, Crum (1893). "Professor William Dittmar". Proceedings of the Royal Society of Edinburgh (obituary, read June 19, 1893). 20: vi–vii.
