= Holger Forchhammer =

Danish football executive (1848–1927)

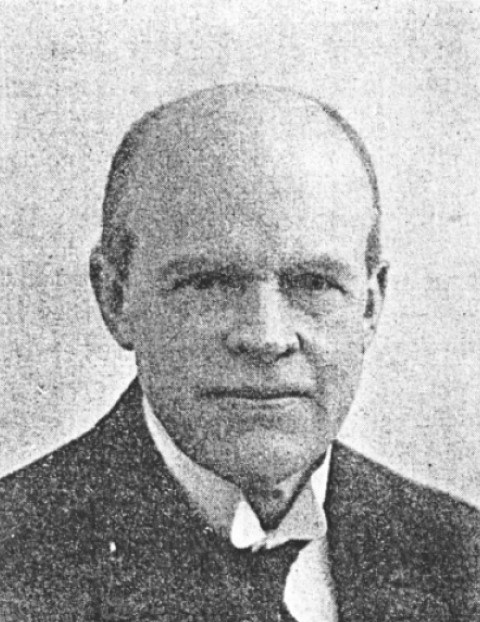
- Holger Forchhammer

2nd President of Danish Sports Confederation
- In office 1897–1899
- Preceded by: Victor Hansen
- Succeeded by: Niels V. Holbek
Association football career
- Full name: Holger Forchhammer
- Position: Midfielder
Senior career*
Years	Team	Apps	(Gls)
1889–1894	Akademisk Boldklub	22	(?)
International career
1920	Denmark	0	(0)
Managerial career
- 1894–1898: Akademisk Boldklub
- * Club domestic league appearances and goals

Holger Forchhammer (21 October 1866 – 19 May 1946) was a Danish senior physician, footballer, and football executive, who was the 2nd chairman of the Danish Sports Confederation (DIF) from 1897 to 1899. He was just 31 years old when he took office, thus being the youngest chairman of DIF to date. He became known for his great work to promote children and young people's access to sports.

== Career as a physician ==
Forchhammer was born on 21 October 1866 as the son of Dr. Phil Johannes Forchhammer, a rector in the Aalborg University, later at Herlufsholm School, where he became a student of medicine in 1884, taking his master's degree in 1891. Forchhammer was a reserve doctor at Kysthospitalet in Refsnæs in 1893–94, and two years later, in 1896, he became the head of the medical consultation room of Denmark's first hospital in the present-day meaning of the word, the Frederiks Hospital. He was close friends with the doctor and Nobel Prize winner Niels Ryberg Finsen, and one of Finsen's closest collaborators in his first years, when he was struggling to gain resonance for his important ideas. He thus became a doctor at Finsen's Medical Light Institute in Copenhagen in 1898, where he was chief physician from 1899 to 1912. When Finsen become too weak to do anything, it was Forchhammer who, at the medical congress in Paris in 1900, struck the decisive blow for Finsen's light treatment.

== Sporting career ==
In addition to being a physician, Forchhammer was also a sportsman, developing an interest in cricket and football in the 1880s, two sports that at the time were still practically unknown in the country. In 1883, a group of students who had just graduated from the Frederiksborg Latin School moved to Copenhagen to study at the University of Copenhagen, where the following year they founded the Fredericia Studenternes Kricketklub (FSK), a cricket club so they could play cricket again. Due to a collaboration with Herlufsholm School, where Holger's father was a rector, which revolves around the recruitment of talented players from that school, Holger Forchhammer and his brother Johannes were central figures in the foundation of FSK, with Holger becoming the club's first president. When Kjøbenhavns Boldklub (KB) took the initiative to look at the different forms of football and their laws in 1886, Holger from FSK was asked to be involved and he accepted. In 1886, Forchhammer, together with Frederik Markmann, Ludwig Sylow, and E. Wescher, translated the English association rules into Danish, so from then on rules such as offside and "hand on the ball" were used in Danish football. These rules were first used in a match the following year, in 1887. Prior to this, the matches would be played with a mixture of rugby and football rules, so this translation was a big step in the development of football in Denmark.

He played football with Akademisk Boldklub (AB), and he even helped the club win the Copenhagen championship four times in 1889, and in 1892–94. From 1889 to 1893, he played in 22 matches. He was named captain in 1894, and back then, it was the captain who had the duty of dictating the tactics to be followed and making up the line-ups since the coach as we know him today did not exist back then, so he basically served as a player-coach, and as such, he represented his side a further 22 times in 1894–98, in which AB won the Copenhagen championship a further two times in 1895 and 1896. Furthermore, he also refereed 11 first-division matches. This triple function as a player, coach, and referee with a total of 55 appearances made him the figure with the most first-division matches in a European league in the 19th century. During the summer of 1893, he left Copenhagen, having finished his study of medicine, to take up his internship at a province hospital. He later returned to Copenhagen, where he worked as the head doctor of a large hospital. His brother Johannes Forchhammer won the Danish championship six times with the same club, which is also a world record. Since then, he became an honorary member of the club.

In 1897, he was appointed as the chairman of the Danish Sports Confederation and sat in the post for two years until 1899. He was just 31 years old when he took office, thus being the youngest chairman of DIF to date.

Forchhammer attended social events organized by AB, maintaining connections with former club members such as lecturer Carl Andersen and ophthalmologist Niels Høeg, Despite the age gap, he supported the participation of young people in sports. He was recognized for promoting youth access to sports, and served as a member of the executive committee for the Association for Copenhagen Playgrounds.

In 1920, at the age of 54, Forchhammer was included in the Danish squad that competed in the football tournament of the 1920 Olympic Games in Antwerp. This happened because the squad itself had 20 players, so the final list contained 2 more names to fill all 22 places, Kristian Middelboe, who had already retired and was representing the Danish football federation, and Forchhammer, who was a medical doctor assisting the team.

== Personal life ==
During the 1893 fire at Vallø Castle, Forchhammer rescued people from the fire. For his efforts, Forchhammer was awarded the Danish Medal for noble deeds. Forchhammer also received the Russian Order of Saint Anna.

Forchhammer married the actress Berthe Forchhammer. Together, the Forchhammers raised three children.

== Later life ==
Forchhammer died on the 19th May 1946, at the age of 79. After Forchhammer died, one of his childhood friends (K. Bülow) wrote this about him: "He was not the typical unapproachable head doctor type, but a good and understanding friend who knew how to gather everything and everyone around the great task: to lead Niels Finsen's ideas to victory for the benefit of suffering people".
