= Holten Castenschiold =

Danish football executive (1865–1950)

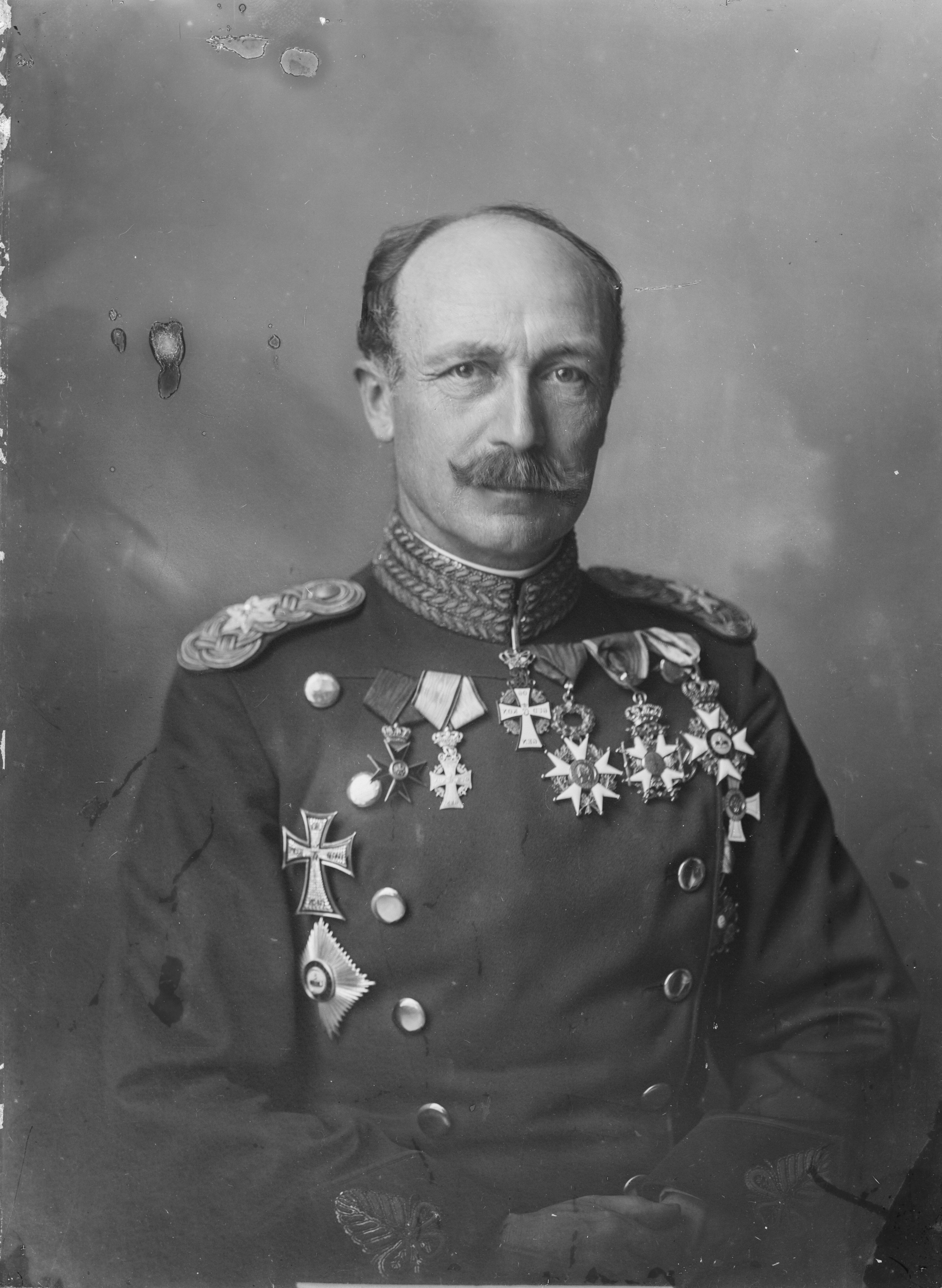
- Castenschiold as major general, before 1930

6th President of Danish Olympic Committee
- In office 1922–1941
- Preceded by: Fritz Hansen
- Succeeded by: Holten F. Castenschiold

Personal details
- Born: Holten Frederik Castenschiold; 12 March 1865 Borreby, Denmark
- Died: 13 January 1950 (aged 84) Copenhagen Military Hospital, Denmark
- Resting place: Garrison Cemetery
- Citizenship: Danish
- Occupation: Military officer; Chamberlain; Football executive
- Known for: 6th President of Danish Olympic Committee

Military service
- Years of service: 1886–1930
- Rank: Major general
- Commands: Inspector General of the Cavalry; Second Division

Holten Frederik Castenschiold (12 March 1865 – 13 January 1950) was a Danish Chamberlain and football executive, who was the sixth chairman of the Danish Olympic Committee from 1922 to 1941. He was a co-founder and chairman of the Danish Military Sports Association from 1918 to 1922 and honorary chairman of the Danish Riding Association from its foundation in 1918.

== Official career ==
Holten Castenschiold was born on 12 March 1865 as the son of a political candidate Henrik Castenschiold and Julie B. Uldall. He became a student at Schneekloths Skole in 1883, but then joined the military and became a second lieutenant in 1886 before becoming first lieutenant in that same year. In 1901, Castenschiold became Rittmeister, and after serving as adjutant to Prince Christian X from 1902 to 1906, he became the chief of staff at the 2nd General Command in 1909, and was appointed colonel the following year. Castenschiold became major general and commander of the 2nd Division in April 1913 and a few months later, on 15 October 1913, he was appointed inspector general of the Cavalry, and was also a commander in Copenhagen in 1926–30 and in the Danish Landsturm in 1923–29, before finally leaving the army in 1930.

== Sporting career ==
Castenschiold became interested in sports. In 1913–14 he was chairman of a committee on the reassembly of the army, and he was repeatedly sent on business trips abroad, even after his departure from the army, attaching foreign princely persons. Already early on, Castenschiold became an advocate for the introduction of more sports-based teaching methods in military training, which, in connection with his great interest in the physical education of young people in general, led to work within voluntary sports. From 1914 to 1922 he was thus chairman of the committee for participation in pentathlon at the Olympic Games, co-founder and chairman 1918–22 of the Danish Military Sports Association as well as honorary chairman of the Danish Equestrian Association from the foundation in 1918. Castenschiold was also entrusted with the management of the committee under Danish Sports, the confederation that in 1921 introduced the sports mark. From 1922 to 1941 he was chairman of DIF. He devoted himself fully to this work and made himself particularly known as an advocate for the educational, health, and character-building content of sports. The amateur case was very much on his mind ("the importance of sport as a social factor lies in the broad basis"), but in addition, he managed to distinguish himself personally in other important cases such as the relationship with workers' sports, the medical inspection and instructor cases and sports with the unemployed in the 1930s. In 1927 he became deputy chairman of Kbh.'s support association, 1933 chairman. - Chamberlain 1929. but in addition he managed to distinguish himself personally in other important cases such as the relationship with workers' sports, the medical control and instructor cases and the sports with the unemployed in the 1930s. In 1927 he became deputy chairman of Kbh.'s support association, 1933 chairman.

Amateur sports was very much on his mind, but in addition he managed to distinguish himself personally as DIF's chairman in i.a. the relationship with worker sports, medical check-up and instructor cases.

== Personal life ==
He died in Copenhagen Military Hospital on 13 January 1950, aged 84. He is buried at Garrison Cemetery, but the burial site has been closed.
