= Victor Hansen (author) =

Danish football executive (1837–1912)

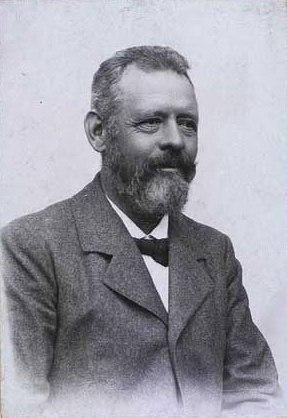
- Victor Hansen

1st President of Danish Olympic Committee
- In office 1896–1897
- Succeeded by: Holger Forchhammer
- Born: Johan Emil Victor Hansen; 9 October 1837; Copenhagen, Denmark
- Died: 16 May 1912 (aged 74); Copenhagen, Denmark
- Resting place: Assistens Cemetery
- Citizenship: Danish
- Occupations: Athlete; Football executive
- Known for: 1st President of Danish Olympic Committee

Johan Emil Victor Hansen (9 October 1837 – 16 May 1912) was a Danish counter admiral, author, and football executive, who was the first chairman of the Danish Olympic Committee (DIF) from May 1896 to 1897.

During his career in the Royal Danish Navy, he became a cadet in 1850, a second lieutenant with Gerner's medal in 1857, lieutenant in 1858, first lieutenant in 1868, captain in 1874, commander in 1886, and finally, a counter admiral in 1898, and then served as superintendent in the eastern district for eleven years (1898–1909).

He founded Denmark's first sports magazine Tidsskrift for Sport in 1884, where he was chief editor until 1892. He was the chairman of DIF for only one year, but retained the title of president until his death in 1912. He was also the president of the Federation of Danish Motorists. At the same time, he was the author of several books and editor of periodicals.

== Naval career ==
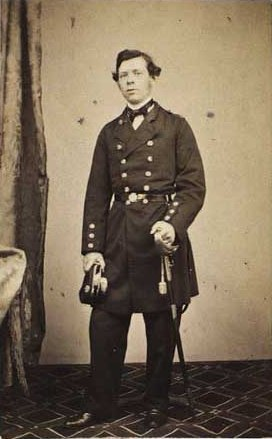
Victor Hansen in 1870.

Born in Copenhagen in 1837 as the son of a musician, he became a cadet in 1850, aged only 13, and in 1957, at the age of 20, he became a second lieutenant with a Gerner's medal. Hansen went on a voyage with the corvette Heimdal to Madeira in 1858 and underwent an 1858–59 course at the gymnastic institute. In 1859 he sailed in koffardi with the steamship Odin in England and Iceland, and also served as an inspection officer at Gammelholm and also for a time as a submarine outfitter. In 1862–63 he was with the corvette Dagmar in the West Indies, under which for two and a half months he was the harbourmaster of St. Thomas (1862). During the military deployment in 1864, he was first with the corvette Heimdal in the Baltic Squadron and took part in the Battle of Jasmund at Rügen on 17 March. Later he took part on board the same ship in the North Sea Squadron's Battle of Heligoland on 9 May.

In 1865 he took a leave of absence for three years to go on a suitcase voyage. In 1866, on a voyage to the Mediterranean, he led Frederik VII's former steamship Falken, which had been bought by H.P. Prior to be sold to the then Greek King, George I of Greece. In 1866–67, he was captain of another of Prior's ships, the steamship Flora, in 1868 of the steamship Zephyr belonging to the United Steamship Company. In 1868 he returned to service in the navy and was promoted to first lieutenant shortly after. In 1868–69 he went with the frigate Jylland to the Mediterranean and in 1869–70 he went with the corvette Thor to the West Indies. In 1870–71, Hansen was the second-in-command at the naval officers' school, where he excelled due to his ability to get along with people and his versatile knowledge. For periods he also worked here as a teacher in drawing, since he was a skilled painter and draughtsman, and in seamanship, thus participating in the annual outings with screw gunboats used for cadet ships, along with a large number of other tasks.

In 1874, on the occasion of the millennium celebration of Iceland's settlement, King Christian IX visited Iceland, thus becoming the first Danish king to set foot on Icelandic soil, and Hansen was among the crew of the corvette Heimdal, which was the escort ship for Christian IX. In 1875, he was commander of the armored schooner Esbern Snare which carried out troop transports. In 1876 he was with Heimdal again, this time in Russia, and in 1879 he was the second in command of the frigate Sjælland. In 1882 he was commander of the torpedo boat division, and in 1883 and 1884, he was the commander of the brig Ørnen, which was a training ship for non-commissioned officer trainees. He became a commander in 1886, and since then until 1898, he had a long series of external commands, such as in 1889 as the commander of the Lindormen-class minelayer, and in 1890–93 as chief of staff to the vice admiral, in 1894–95 as commander of the corvette Dagmar to the Mediterranean, and in 1895 as commander for the armored ship Odin. Hansen became a counter admiral in 1898, the same year that he was with the screw schooner St. Thomas in the West Indies. The ship acted as a station ship during the hostilities between the United States and Spain in 1898. He then retired from the Navy, and between 1898 and 1909, he served as superintendent in the eastern district until being dismissed in 1909 due to age.

== Author career ==
Hansen was industrious with an organizational talent and a winning personality. Despite his naval deployments, he wrote extensively. In connection with his work at the naval officers' school, in 1875 he wrote a much-used textbook on seamanship. He was the author of Lærebog i Sømandsskab (1875), Omarbejdelse af Farvandsbeskrivelser (1875), Under forskellige Himmelstrøg (1885), Illustreret Idrætsbog (1888–92), Vore Søhelte (which was a great popular historical work) (1897). From 1859, he was one of the most diligent contributors to Tidsskrift for the Navy, of which he was also co-editor from 1881 to 1889 (together with W.A. Carstensen) and the sole editor from 1889 to 1897. His annual articles in this journal on the state of the Navy are valuable historical records. Through articles, he asserted the Navy's point of view against the Army during the political dispute over the defense in the 1880s.

== Sporting career ==
From his youth, he had an interest in Danish gymnastics. In 1884 he founded Tidsskrift for Sport, which he edited until 1892. Between 1890 and 1893, he wrote and published the sections 4, 6, and 7 of the work Illustreret Idrætsbog (Illustrated Sports Book), which today is a valuable historical source for the development of sports in Denmark. When the Danish Sports Association was formed in 1896, he became its first chairman with the title of president. He was the chairman of DIF for only one year, but retained the title of president until his death in 1912. He was an advocate of the automobile and in 1910 helped to found the company De forenede danske motorejere, of which he was the first chairman. He sat on the board of the Danish tourist associations. Furthermore, he was 1892–99 chairman of the Naval Officers' Association. At the time of his death, H. sat on the boards of the united tug companies, the steamship companies Kjøbenhavn, Union, Ocean, Dan, and the Cosmopolitan Shipping Company. He was also chairman of the Danish branch of the Association for the establishment of Scandinavian sailors' homes in foreign ports.

He had a rare ability to see which questions would become central in the public debate. He emerged as a natural focal point within the interests he worked for. The main point of view that was the basis of H's extensive organizational work can be summarized as: "The healthy upbringing and skilling of young people".

== Later life ==
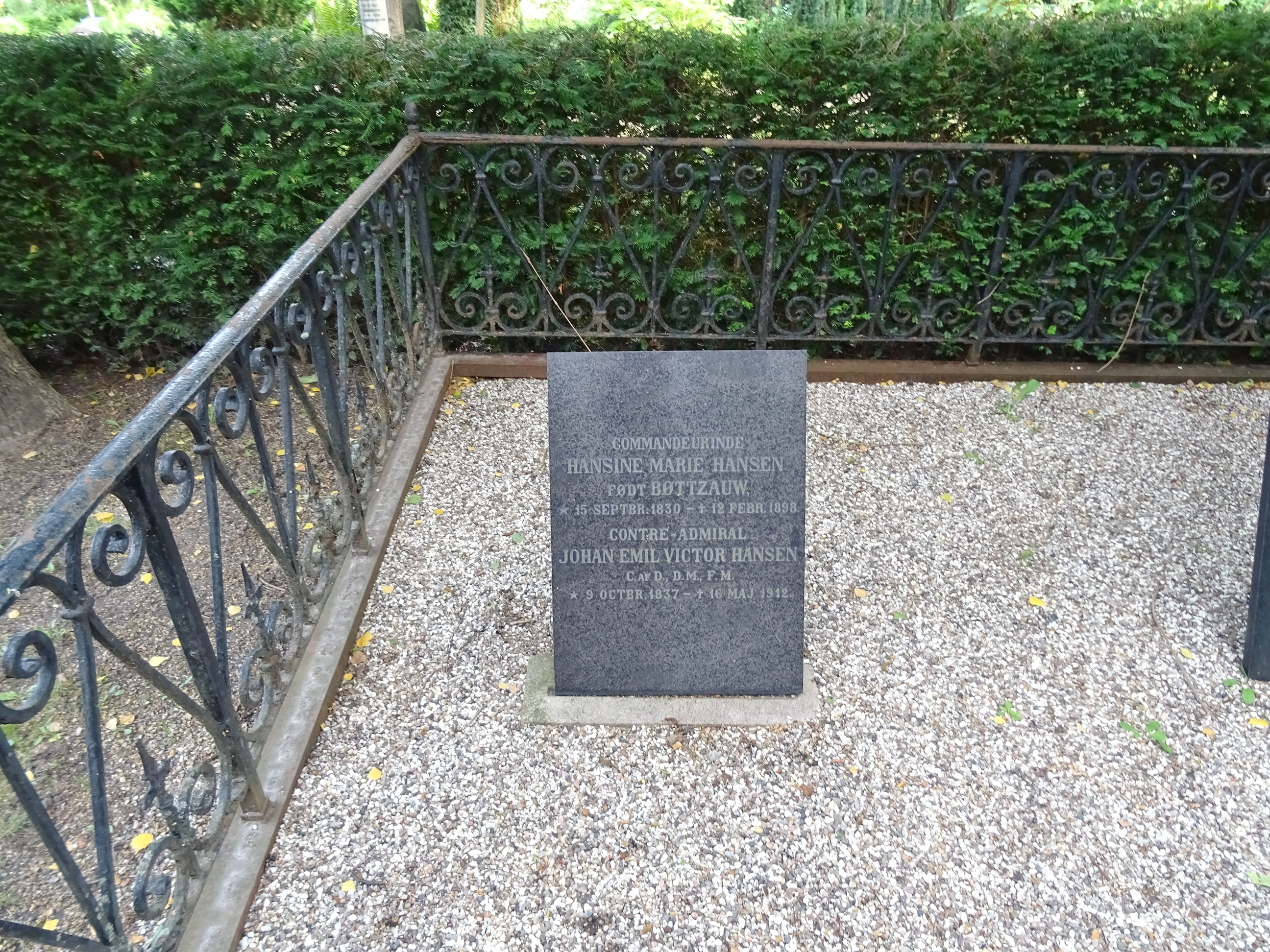
Grave of the counter admiral Johan Emil Victor Hansen (1837–1912) at Holmens Kirkegård in Østerbro in Copenhagen.

He died on 16 May 1912.
