= Fritz Hansen (officer) =

Danish lieutenant colonel and sports executive

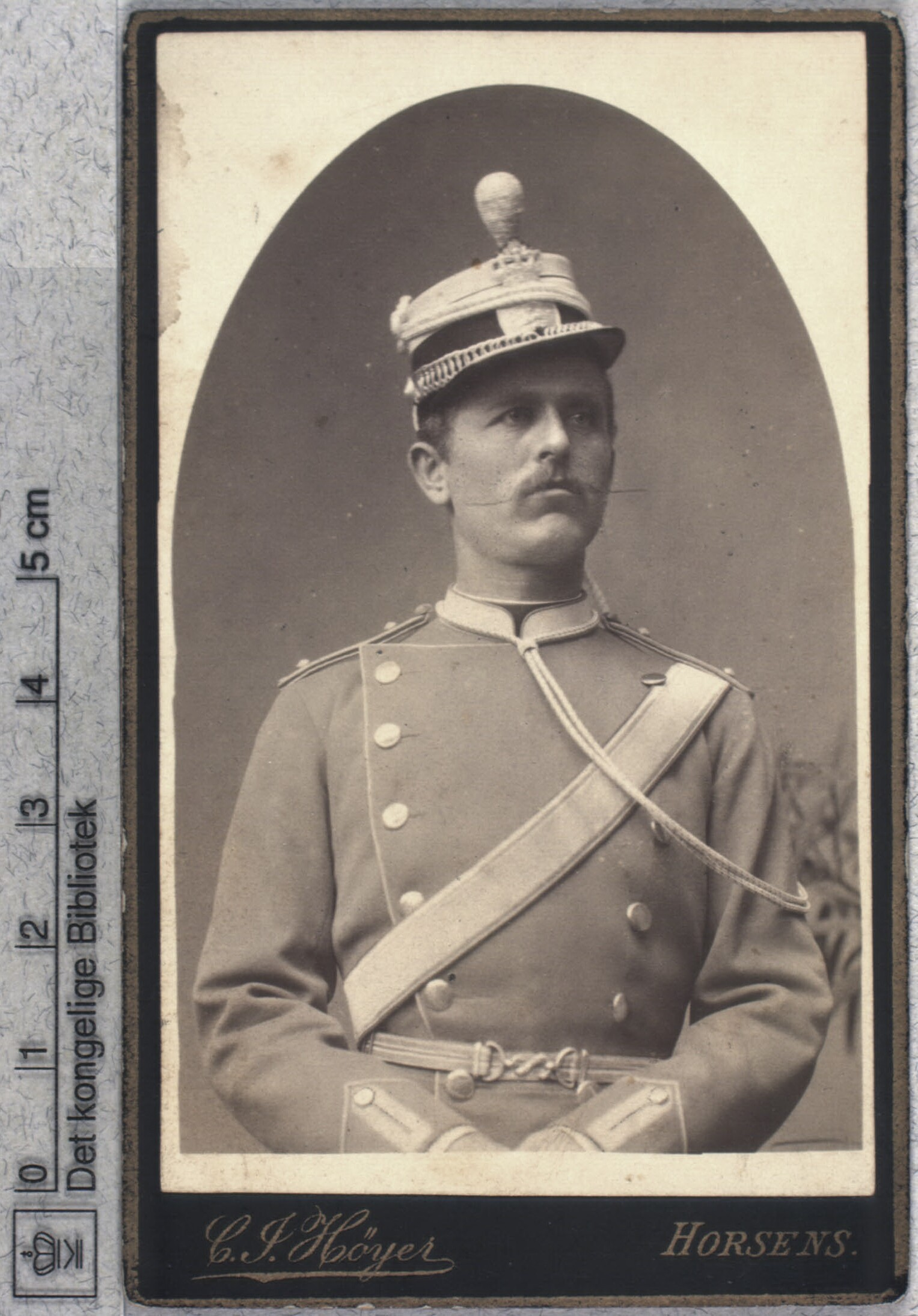
- Fritz Hansen

4th President of Danish Sports Confederation
- In office 1901–1909
- Preceded by: Niels V. Holbek
- Succeeded by: Johan L. Nathansen

Danish members of the IOC
- In office 1912–1921
- Preceded by: Torben Grut
- Succeeded by: Ivar Nyholm

Personal details
- Born: Fritz Edvard Hansen; 30 January 1855 Copenhagen, Denmark
- Died: 11 November 1921 (aged 66) Haderslev, Denmark

Fritz Edvard Hansen (30 January 1855 – 11 November 1921) was a Danish lieutenant colonel and sports executive, who served as the 4th chairman of the Danish Sports Confederation (DIF) from 1901 until 1909. He successfully established a stable organizational structure for DIF, helping athletes connect with the broader international community through their participation in world competitions.

== Military career ==
Born in Copenhagen on 30 January 1855, Hansen became a second lieutenant in 1869, at the age of 19, and seven years later, he was promoted to first lieutenant in the Artillery, advancing to captain in 1892, and eventually reaching the rank of lieutenant colonel before retiring in 1907.

== Sporting career ==
In 1901, Hansen was appointed as the fourth chairman of the Danish Sports Confederation (replacing Niels V. Holbek), a position that he held for eight years, from 1901 until 1909, when he was replaced by Johan L. Nathansen. From this position, he was able to successfully stabilize DIF's organizational structure, and its athletes were connected with the broader international community through their participation in world competitions. Under his leadership, Prince Christian became its patron, thus raising DIF's reputation and prestige.

In addition to his work at DIF, Hansen also co-founded and chaired the Danish Olympic Committee from 1905 until 1920, as well as the Danish Cyclist Association until 1909, and even founded the Nordic Sports Committee, which aimed to co-organize sports within the Nordic countries. In 1912, he replaced Torben Grut as the new Danish member of the International Olympic Committee (IOC), a position that he held for nine years, until he died in 1921, being replaced by Ivar Nyholm.

== Death and legacy ==
Hansen died in Haderslev on 11 November 1921, at the age of 79. In recognition of his contributions, he received several prestigious awards, such as a Knight of the Order of the Dannebrog, the Order of the Savior from Greece, the Order of St. Anna from Russia, and the Order of the Sword from Sweden.
