= Victor M. Hansen =

Victor M. Hansen is an American lawyer and military officer, and a professor of law at the New England School of Law, in Boston.

Hansen is notable for his wide publications on military justice and the treatment of captives held in extrajudicial detention by the Bush Presidency.

== Publications ==
- Victor M. Hansen. "The Jordan Abu Ghraib Verdict: Command Responsibility in the UCMJ". The Jurist.
- Victor M. Hansen (December 15, 2005). "No Secret Rules on Torture". Washington Post.
- Victor M. Hansen (May 2006). "Going Native at Guantanamo: When Government Lawyers Lose Their Way". Jurist Forum.
- Victor M. Hansen, Lawrence M. Friedman (March 2006). "The Army and the Constitution: Time for Congress to Step In". Jurist Forum.
- Victor M. Hansen, Lawrence M. Friedman (September 2006). "Congress Should Champion the Advice of Military Lawyers". Jurist Forum.
