= Kristian Middelboe =

Danish footballer (1881-1965)

Medal record

Men's Football

Representing Denmark

Olympic Games
Silver medal – second place	1908 London	Team competition

Kristian Middelboe (24 March 1881 in Brunnby, Sweden – 20 May 1965) was a Danish amateur football (soccer) player and leader. Playing in the defender position, he won a silver medal with the Danish national team in the 1908 Summer Olympics football tournament. He was head of the Danish Football Association 1935-1940 and again 1948-1950. He was the brother of fellow international Nils Middelboe.

Kristian Middelboe played his club football with Kjøbenhavns Boldklub (KB), making his debut in 1898. He made his debut in the first Danish national team ever, the 9-0 win against the French B-team at the 1908 Olympics. He played in the first four games of the Danish national team from 1908 to 1910. Kristian entered the KB board in 1910, was named KB chairman in 1919, and head of the Danish Football Association (DBU) in 1935. From 1940 to 1948, the DBU was chaired by Leo Frederiksen, but at his departure, Middelboe resumed the position until 1950. He chaired the Danish international team board until 1951, selecting the players for the national team. Here, he reluctantly oversaw the tactical change from his favorite Pyramid tactic to the modern WM formation. He did not leave his last administrative position in Danish sports, until he met the official age restriction in 1964.
