= August Friedrich Wilhelm Forchhammer =

Danish jurist and historian (1797–1870)

August Friedrich Wilhelm Forchhammer (18 December 1797 in Husum – 16 February 1870 in Kiel) was a jurist and historian from the Duchy of Schleswig.

He was born in Husum. He was a brother of Johan Georg Forchhammer, and through him an uncle of Johannes Nicolai Georg Forchhammer and granduncle of Henni and Johannes Georg Forchhammer.

He studied jurisprudence in Kiel, and worked here as an attorney from 1823 to 1848. From 1848 to 1862 he served as Obersachwalter. He wrote books on the constitutional law of Schleswig (1823) and a two-volume history on Schleswig from the Protestant Reformation to the year 1712 (1834). He received an honorary degree in jurisprudence at the University of Kiel in 1869, but died in February 1870.
