= Danish Football Association =

Governing body of association football in Denmark

UEFA
- Short name: DBU
- Founded: 18 May 1889; 137 years ago
- Headquarters: Brøndbyvester
- FIFA affiliation: 21 May 1904
- UEFA affiliation: 15 June 1954; 72 years ago
- President: Jesper Møller (2014–)
- Website: www.dbu.dk

The Danish Football Association (Danish: Dansk Boldspil-Union; abbr. DBU) is the governing body of football in Denmark. It is the organization of Danish football clubs and runs the professional Danish football leagues, alongside the men's and women's national teams. Based in the city of Brøndby, it is a founding member of both FIFA and UEFA. The DBU has also been the governing body of futsal in Denmark since 2008.

== Beginnings ==
The DBU was founded on 18 May 1889 and was the first national football association outside Great Britain and Ireland. However, it did not register games officially before the 1908 Summer Olympics, meaning that the win in the 1906 Intercalated Olympics tournament was not officially recorded by the DBU.

== List of presidents ==
The following is a list of presidents since its creation in 1905.

President	Term
Frederik Markmann	1889–1890
Harald Hilarius-Kalkau	1890–1894
Johannes Forchhammer	1894–1897
Albert Albertsen	1897–1911
Ludvig Sylow	1911–1918
Louis Østrup	1918–1935
Kristian Middelboe	1935–1940
Leo Frederiksen	1940–1948
Kristian Middelboe	1948–1950
Ebbe Schwartz	1950–1964
Vilhelm Skousen	1965–1977
Carl Nielsen	1977–1990
Hans Erik Jensen	1990–1991
Poul Hyldgaard	1991–2002
Allan Hansen	2002–2014
Jesper Møller	2014–present

== DBU competitions ==
=== Men's ===
- Leagues
  - Superliga
  - First Division (1. Division)
  - Second Divisions (2. Division)
  - Third Divisions (3. Division)
  - Denmark Series (Danmarksserien) (4 groups)
- Cups
  - DBU Pokalen

=== Women's ===
- Leagues
  - A-Liga
  - B-Liga
  - C-Liga (2 groups)
  - Denmark Series women (Danmarksserien) (3 groups)
- Cups
- Cup (Landspokalturneringen)

=== Defunct ===
- Landsfodboldturneringen (1913–1927)
- Provinsmesterskabsturneringen (1913–1931)
- Sylow-Tournament (1918–1926)

== Regional structure ==
DBU Jutland (numbers indicate regions) DBU Funen DBU Zealand DBU Lolland-Falster DBU Copenhagen DBU Bornholm

The DBU is separated into six regional associations, based on the former counties of Denmark:

- DBU Jutland, which in turn is separated into four regions:
  - Region 1: Nordjylland County
  - Region 2: Viborg and Ringkøbing counties
  - Region 3: Århus and Vejle counties
  - Region 4: Ribe and South Jutland counties
- DBU Funen: Funen County
- DBU Zealand: West Zealand, Roskilde, Frederiksborg, Copenhagen counties and Zealand part of Storstrøm County
- DBU Copenhagen: Frederiksberg and Copenhagen municipalities
- DBU Lolland-Falster: Non-Zealand part of Storstrøm County
- DBU Bornholm: Bornholm municipality

The Faroe Islands and Greenland, which are autonomous territories within Denmark, have their own football associations and are not part of the DBU. Greenland is not a member of FIFA or any continental federation, but the Faroe Islands are a member of both FIFA and UEFA.

== National teams ==
The Denmark national football teams represents Denmark in international football competitions and is controlled by the DBU. As of June 2021, the teams consist of:

=== Men's ===
- A-level National Team
- Under-21 National Team
- Under-20 National Team
- Under-19 National Team
- Under-18 National Team
- Under-17 National Team
- Under-16 National Team
- Futsal National Team
- Oldboys National Team

=== Women's ===
- A-level National Team
- Under-23 National Team
- Under-19 National Team
- Under-17 National Team
- Under-16 National Team

== Yearly honours ==
The DBU awards the best national team players each year, with an award to the best senior team player, as well as the best player in three of the DBU's six national youth teams.

Player of the Year

Since 1963, the DBU has awarded the Danish Player of the Year in a vote amongst the Danish players. In the time of amateur football, only players in the domestic league could achieve the prize, and even after the emergence of paid football in 1978, no players in foreign clubs were eligible for the award. When the award was finally opened to all Danish players, domestic and abroad, in 1983, national team captain Morten Olsen was the first player to win the Player of the Year award taking all Danish players into consideration. The record number of award wins is four, by Brian Laudrup (1989, 1992, 1995, and 1997).

Young Players of the Year

The Young Players of the Year Awards on the other hand are sponsored by Arla Foods. The awards were initially known as Mælkens talentpriser (the Milk Talent Awards) in order to promote the line of dairy products of the company then known as MD Foods. DBU found new sponsor DONG (later DONG Energy), an oil company, in 2004 but Arla went on to sponsor the prize which was renamed Arla's talentpriser (the Arla Talent Awards) in 2005.

== National team contract negotiations ==
Women's national team

In 2017, the negotiations regarding terms and salary with the women's national team broke down, causing DBU to cancel the world cup qualification match against Sweden. The team lost the match 3–0 due to forfeit, and DBU was handed a fine by the UEFA disciplinary committee. After the parties eventually reached a collective bargaining agreement, Denmark finished second in their group and advanced to the playoffs, but failed to qualify for the 2019 FIFA Women's World Cup after losing 4–1 on aggregate to the Netherlands in the playoff semi-finals.

Men's national team

Following the 2018 FIFA World Cup, the agreement between the DBU and the men's national team expired, leading to a dispute over commercial rights. In September 2018, the DBU selected a temporary squad consisting of lower-league and futsal players for a friendly against Slovakia, which they lost 3–0. The regular national team players returned for the subsequent UEFA Nations League match against Wales after a temporary truce was signed. A new six-year collective bargaining agreement was finalized in late September 2018, lasting until 2024.

The badge remains in use on the Danish men's national team kits, featuring in recent tournaments such as the 2022 FIFA World Cup and UEFA Euro 2024.

Equal Team Pay

In June 2024, prior to UEFA Euro 2024, the DBU and the players' union (Spillerforeningen) agreed to a new four-year deal ensuring equal basic pay for the men's and women's national teams. As part of the agreement, the men's team refused a pay rise to fund equal match fees for the women's team. Additionally, the men's team accepted a 15% reduction in insurance coverage to fund a 50% upgrade in coverage for the women's team and the men's U21 team.
