= Johan Georg Forchhammer =

Danish geologist (1794–1865)

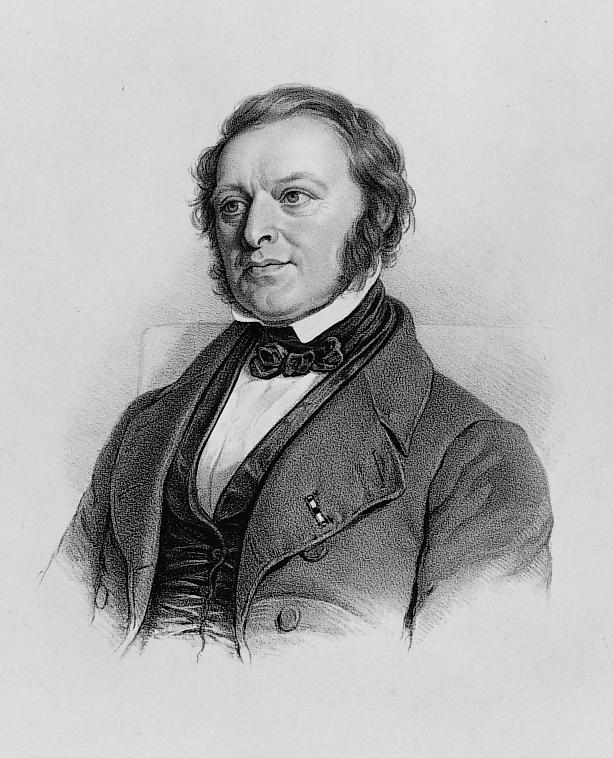
- Forchhammer, c. 1850
- Born: Johan Georg Forchhammer; 26 July 1794; Husum, Duchy of Schleswig (now Germany)
- Died: 14 December 1865 (aged 71); Copenhagen, Denmark
- Resting place: Assistens Cemetery
- Spouse: Louise Christiane Fugl (m. 1825)
- Children: Johannes Forchhammer
- Scientific career
- Fields: Geology, chemistry
- Workplaces: University of Copenhagen, Technical University of Denmark
- Academic advisors: Hans Christian Ørsted

Johan Georg Forchhammer (26 July 1794 – 14 December 1865) was a Danish mineralogist and geologist.

== Early life and education ==
Forchhammer was born at Husum, Schleswig. He studied at the universities of Kiel and Copenhagen from 1815 to 1818.

== Career ==
Forchhammer then joined Hans Christian Ørsted and Lauritz Esmarch in their mineralogical exploration of Bornholm, and took a considerable share in the labors of the expedition. In 1820 he obtained his doctorate by a chemical treatise De mangano, and immediately after set out on a journey through England, Scotland and the Faroe Islands. In 1823 he was appointed lecturer at Copenhagen University on chemistry and mineralogy; in 1829 he obtained a similar post in the newly established polytechnic school; and in 1831 he was appointed professor of mineralogy in the university, and in 1848 became curator of the geological museum.

From 1835 to 1837 he made many contributions to the geological survey of Denmark. On the death of Hans Christian Ørsted in 1851, he succeeded him as director of the polytechnic school and secretary of the Academy of Sciences. In 1850 he began with Japetus Steenstrup and Jens Jacob Asmussen Worsaae various anthropological publications which gained a high reputation. As a public instructor Forchhammer held a high place and contributed potently to the progress of his favorite studies in his native country. He interested himself in such practical questions as the introduction of gas into Copenhagen, the establishment of the fire-brigade at Rosenborg and the boring of artesian wells.

In 1865, Johan Georg Forchhammer conjectured that the ratio of major salts in samples of seawater from various locations was constant. This constant ratio is known as Forchhammer's Principle, or the Principle of Constant Proportions. Forchhhammer's theory was proven correct in 1884 by Prof William Dittmar following extensive analysis of sea-water samples taken during the Challenger expedition.

Among his more important works are Lærebog i. de enkelte Radicalers Chemi (1842); Danmarks geognostiske Forhold (1835); Om de Bornholmske Kulformationer (1836); Dit myere Kridt i Danmark (1847); Bidrag til Skildringer af Danmarks geographiske Forhold i deres Afhængighed af Landets indre geognostiske Bygning (1858). A list of his contributions to scientific periodicals, Danish, English and German, will be found in the Catalogue of Scientific Papers published by the Royal Society of London. One of the most interesting and most recent is "On the Constitution of Sea Water at Different Depths and in Different Latitudes", in the Proceedings of the Roy. Soc. xii. (1862-1863).

He was a Commander of the Order of the Dannebrog, and was a member of the Royal Danish Academy of Sciences and Letters from 1825. In 1863, he was elected a foreign member of the Royal Swedish Academy of Sciences. He died at Copenhagen.

He was the brother of August Friedrich Wilhelm Forchhammer, father of Johannes Nicolai Georg Forchhammer, and grandfather of Johannes Georg Forchhammer.

== Personal life ==
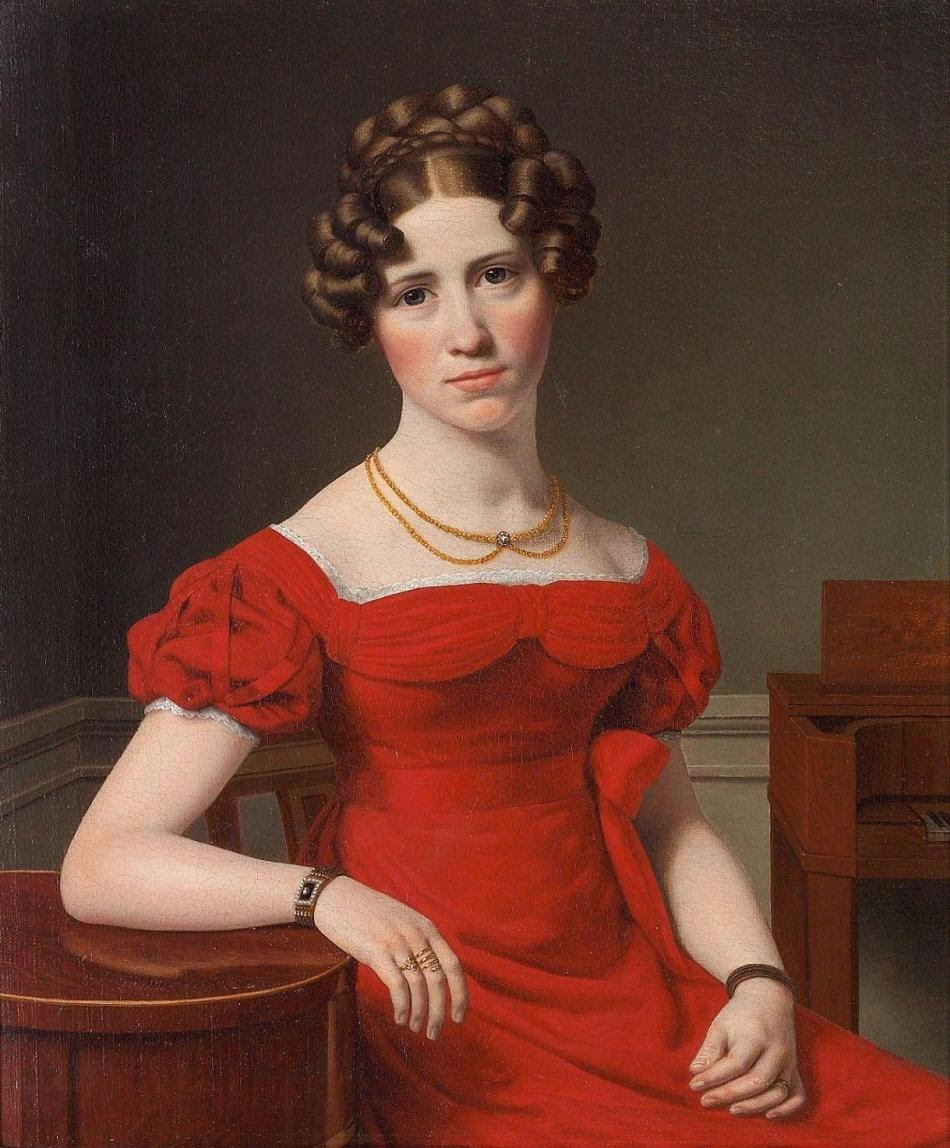
Louise Christiane Fugl

Forchhammer married twice. He married Louise Christiane Fugl, a daughter of kancelliråd U. N. Fugl (1768 – 1817), in 1826. She died in 1831 and he then married her half-sister Emilie Mariane Fugl. They lived in the Professor's House at Nørregade 8–10 in Copenhagen from 1833 and until his death in 1865.

Forchhammer's son Johannes Forchhammer, the only child from his first marriage, was a linguist and headmaster of Aalborg Cathedral School and Herlufsholm. Gis second marriage was without children.

Forchhammer died on 14 December 1865 and is buried in Assistens Cemetery.

== Awards ==
Forchhammer was a member of the Royal Danish Academy of Sciences and Letters from 1825. He was awarded the Order of the Dannebrog in 1939 and was created Commander of the Order of the Dannebrog in 1860.

He was elected as a member of the American Philosophical Society in 1862.

== Written works ==
- De mangano, 1820
- "Danmarks Geognostiske Forhold", in Universitetsprogram, 1835.
- Det nyere Kridt i Danmark, 1847.
- Lærebog i Stoffernes Almindelige Chemie, 1842.
- De enkelte Radikalers Almindelige Chemie, 1842 (textbook).
- Bornholmske Kulformationer, 1836.
- De vigtigste Sætninger af den uorganiske Chemie, 1838.
- Bidrag til Skildringen af Danmarks geographiske Forhold i deres Afhængighed af Landets indre geognostiske Bygning, 1858.
- Om Søvandets bestanddele og deres Fordeling i Havet, 1859.
- Almenfattelige Afhandlinger og Foredrag, 1869.
- Selvbiografi i Universitetes Program, November 1903.
