= Peter Wilhelm Forchhammer =

German classical scholar, classical archaeologist and politician (1801–1894)

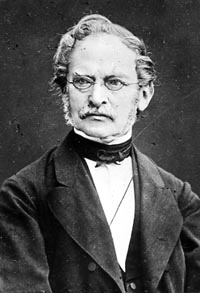
Peter Wilhelm Forchhammer

Peter Wilhelm Forchhammer (23 October 1801 – 8 January 1894) was a German classical archaeologist born at Husum in Schleswig.

He was educated at the Lübeck gymnasium and the university of Kiel, with which he was connected for nearly 65 years. In 1830–1834 and 1838–1840 he travelled in Italy, Greece, Asia Minor, and Egypt. In 1843 he was appointed professor of philology at Kiel and director of the archaeological museum founded by himself in co-operation with Otto Jahn.

Forchhammer was an active democrat, and from 1871 to 1873 represented the progressive party of Schleswig-Holstein in the German Reichstag. His published works deal chiefly with topography and ancient mythology. His travels had convinced him that a full and comprehensive knowledge of classical antiquity could be acquired only by a thorough acquaintance with Greek and Roman monuments and works of art, and a detailed examination of the topographical and climatic conditions of the chief localities of the ancient world. These principles are illustrated in his Hellenika Griechenland im Neuen das Alte (1837), which contains his theory of the origin and explanation of the Greek myths, which he never abandoned, in spite of the attacks to which it was subjected. According to him, the myths arose from definite local (especially atmospheric and aquatic) phenomena, and represented the annually recurring processes of nature as the acts of gods and heroes; thus, in Achill (1853), the Trojan War is the winter conflict of the elements in that district.

Other similar short treatises are:

- Die Gründung Roms (1868)
- Daduchos (1875), on the language of the myths and mythical buildings
- Die Wanderwangen der Inachostochter Io (1880)
- Prolegomena zur Mythologie als Wissenschaft und Lexikon der Mythensprache (1891).

Among his topographical works mention may be made of:

- Topographie von Athen (1841)
- Beschreibung der Ebene von Troja (1850), a commentary on a map of the locality executed by T. A. Spratt (see Journal of the Royal Geographical Society, xii., 1842)
- Topographia Thebarum Heptapylarum (1854); Erklärung der Ilias (1884), on the basis of the topographical and physical peculiarities of the plain of Troy.

His Demokratenbüchlein (1849), in the main a discussion of the Aristotelian theory of the state, and Die Athener und Sokrates (1837), in which, contrary to the almost universal opinion, he upheld the procedure of the Athenians as perfectly legal and their verdict as a perfectly just one, also deserve notice.
