= Johannes Forchhammer =

Danish philologist (1827–1909)

Johannes Nicolai Georg Forchhammer (20 March 1827 – 9 July 1909) was a Danish philologist.

He was born in Copenhagen as a son of Johan Georg Forchhammer. He was a nephew of August Friedrich Wilhelm Forchhammer. He finished his secondary education in 1843, and completed the cand.philol. degree in 1848. He took the magistratus degree in 1852, and then studied for a period in Italy. He was a part of a Nordic intellectual group here, which included Julius Middelthun, Christoffer Borch, Johan Peter Weisse and Niels Ravnkilde.

He worked as a school teacher in Christianshavn from 1848 to 1851, and for a second period after returning from Italy. He also held lectures at the University of Copenhagen. In 1859 he was hired as headmaster at Aalborg Cathedral School. He became a member of the Landsting in 1866, but relinquished the seat in 1868 when he became principal of Aalborg Cathedral School. He moved on to Herlufsholm School in 1872. During his career he published several articles on philology and history, especially in the journal Dansk Maanedsskrift. He retired in 1892, and died in July 1909.

He was the father of physicist Johannes Georg Forchhammer.
