= 1976–77 Panathinaikos F.C. season =

Panathinaikos
1976–77 season
- Chairman: Apostolos Nikolaidis
- Manager: Aymoré Moreira; Antonis Migiakis; Kazimierz Górski
- Alpha Ethniki: 1st (champions)
- Greek Cup: Winners
- Balkans Cup: Winners
- Top goalscorer: Óscar Álvarez (19)
| Home colours | Away colours |

The 1976–77 season was the 18th consecutive season of Panathinaikos in the top flight of Greek football. They competed in the Alpha Ethniki, the Greek Cup and the Balkans Cup.

== Squad ==
Note: Flags indicate national team as defined under FIFA eligibility rules; some limited exceptions apply. Players may hold more than one non-FIFA nationality.

| No. | Pos. | Nation | Player |
|---|---|---|---|
| — | GK | (Greece) GRE | Nikos Valianos |
| — | GK | (Greece) GRE | Vasilis Konstantinou |
| — | DF | (Cyprus) CYP | Demetris Kizas |
| — | DF | (Greece) GRE | Anthimos Kapsis |
| — | DF | (Greece) GRE | Mitsos Dimitriou |
| — | MF | (Greece) GRE | Kostas Eleftherakis |
| — | MF | (Greece) GRE | Mimis Domazos (captain) |

| No. | Pos. | Nation | Player |
|---|---|---|---|
| — | MF | (Socialist Federal Republic of Yugoslavia) YUG | Borivoje Đorđević |
| — | MF | (Greece) GRE | Spiros Livathinos |
| — | FW | (Argentina) ARG | Óscar Marcelino Álvarez |
| — | FW | (Greece) GRE | Antonis Antoniadis |
| — | FW | (Greece) GRE | Giorgos Rokidis |
| — | FW | (Greece) GRE | Giorgos Gonios |
| — | FW | (Greece) GRE | Takis Papadimitriou |

== Competitions ==
=== Alpha Ethniki ===
==== League table ====
| Pos | Team | Pld | W | D | L | GF | GA | GD | Pts | Qualification or relegation |
|---|---|---|---|---|---|---|---|---|---|---|
| 1 | Panathinaikos (C) | 34 | 23 | 8 | 3 | 70 | 20 | +50 | 54 | Qualification for European Cup first round |
| 2 | Olympiacos | 34 | 23 | 6 | 5 | 70 | 27 | +43 | 52 | Qualification for UEFA Cup first round |
| 3 | PAOK | 34 | 21 | 10 | 3 | 63 | 27 | +36 | 52 | Qualification for Cup Winners' Cup first round (Note: Since Panathinaikos, winners of 1976–77 Greek Cup, were qualified for the 1977–78 European Cup, runners-up PAOK earned a spot in the first round of the 1977–78 European Cup Winners' Cup.) |
| 4 | AEK Athens | 34 | 24 | 3 | 7 | 63 | 29 | +34 | 51 | Qualification for UEFA Cup first round |
| 5 | Aris | 34 | 17 | 8 | 9 | 58 | 34 | +24 | 42 | |

Source: RSSSF
Rules for classification: 1st points; 2nd total goal ratio; 3rd decision match.
(C) Champions

=== Greek Cup ===
==== Matches ====
| 22 June 1977 Final | Panathinaikos | 2–1 | PAOK | Piraeus |
| 21:00 EEST | Papadimitriou 29'; Vakalis 83' | Report | Terzanidis 43' | Stadium: Karaiskakis Stadium; Attendance: 28,490; Referee: Manolis Platopoulos (Athens) |

=== Balkans Cup ===
| Pos | Team | Pld | W | D | L | GF | GA | GR | Pts | Qualification |
|---|---|---|---|---|---|---|---|---|---|---|
| 1 | (Greece) Panathinaikos (A) | 4 | 2 | 2 | 0 | 8 | 4 | 2.000 | 6 | Advances to finals |
| 2 | (Socialist Federal Republic of Yugoslavia) Budućnost Titograd | 4 | 1 | 2 | 1 | 6 | 5 | 1.200 | 4 | |
| 3 | (Albania) Vllaznia Shkodër | 4 | 0 | 2 | 2 | 2 | 7 | 0.286 | 2 | |

Source: rsssf.com
Rules for classification: 1) points; 2) goal average; 3) number of goals scored
(A) Advance to a further round

==== Matches ====
===== Group stage =====
| 17 April 1977 | Vllaznia Shkodër (Albania) | 1–1 | (Greece) Panathinaikos | Shkodër |
| | Basha 5' | | Vakalis 24' | Stadium: Vojo Kushi Stadium |

| 8 May 1977 | Panathinaikos (Greece) | 2–2 | (Socialist Federal Republic of Yugoslavia) Budućnost Titograd | Athens |
| | Eleftherakis 39'; Antoniadis 87' | | Miročević 30'; Kovačević 48' | Stadium: Leoforos Alexandras Stadium |

| 26 May 1977 | Panathinaikos (Greece) | 3–0 | (Albania) Vllaznia Shkodër | Athens |
| | Giannakoulas 77', 90'; Papadimitriou 82' | | | Stadium: Leoforos Alexandras Stadium |

| 17 August 1977 | Budućnost Titograd (Socialist Federal Republic of Yugoslavia) | 1–2 | (Greece) Panathinaikos | Titograd |
| | Kovačević 16' | | Papadimitriou 6'; Đorđević 66' | Stadium: pod Goricom |

===== Finals =====
| 14 December 1977 | Slavia Sofia (Bulgaria) | 0–0 | (Greece) Panathinaikos | Sofia |
| | | | | Stadium: Slavia Stadium; Attendance: 2,500 |

| 13 March 1978 | Panathinaikos (Greece) | 2–1 | (Bulgaria) Slavia Sofia | Athens |
| | Eleftherakis 14'; Vakalis 63' | | Minchev 45' | Stadium: Leoforos Alexandras Stadium; Attendance: 6,500; Referee: Marijan Rauš (Yugoslavia) |
