= Mimis Domazos =

Greek footballer (1942–2025)

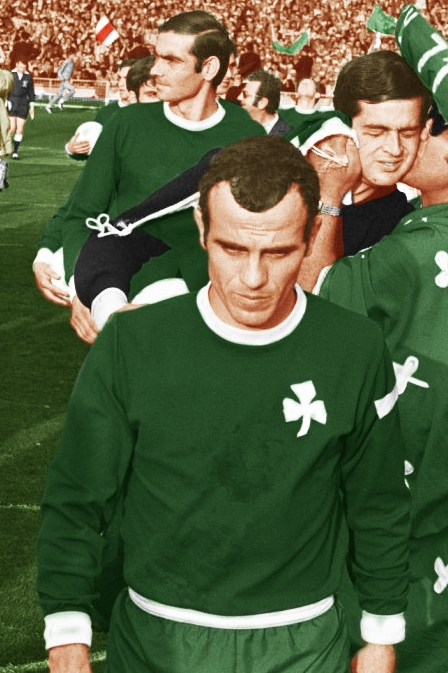
- Domazos with Panathinaikos

Personal information
- Full name: Dimitrios Domazos
- Date of birth: 22 January 1942
- Place of birth: Ampelokipoi, Athens, German-occupied Greece
- Date of death: 24 January 2025 (aged 83)
- Place of death: Athens, Greece
- Height: 1.68 m (5 ft 6 in)
- Position: Attacking midfielder

Youth career
- 1953–1959: Amyna Ambelokipoi

Senior career*
Years	Team	Apps	(Gls)
1959–1978	Panathinaikos	490	(134)
1978–1979	AEK Athens	34	(5)
1979–1980	Panathinaikos	12	(0)
Total		536	(139)

International career
1959–1980	Greece	50	(4)
- * Club domestic league appearances and goals

Dimitris "Mimis" Domazos (Greek: Δημήτρης "Μίμης" Δομάζος; 22 January 1942 – 24 January 2025) was a Greek professional football player who played as an attacking midfielder. His nickname was "The General" (Greek: "Ο Στρατηγός").

He served as Panathinaikos' captain for over 15 years. In 2021, the IFFHS included him in the all-time Best XI of Greek football.

== Club career ==
=== Early career ===
Domazos was born on 22 January 1942 in Ampelokipoi and he grew up next to the Leoforos Alexandras Stadium. His father was a health worker originally from Samos, and his mother was a nurse of Anatolian origin. He played football in the fields nearby from a young age. At the age of 13, he had obtained a sports card (player registration) for Amyna Ampelokipoi in 1953 by providing a false age to be eligible to compete. During the competition, he attracted Panathinaikos F.C.'s interest. In 1958, Svetislav Glišović, a Serbian footballer and manager, saw him play and recommended his acquisition.

=== Panathinaikos ===
Domazos made his unofficial debut with Panathinaikos in a friendly match, playing as a right-winger, against AEK Athens for the Christmas Cup, which was held on 26 December 1958 and ended in a 2–0 defeat for Panathinaikos. In the summer of 1959, he officially joined Panathinaikos at the age of 17 "for a suit and an orange juice", as he had stated. Panathinaikos gave him the nickname "The General", which followed him throughout his football career.

In his first three seasons, he won the same number of championships. He scored in the game that secured the last one on 4 June 1961 in a 3–3 draw against Panionios. On 26 November 1963, Domazos scored four goals in the 5–2 away win against Proodeftiki and became the first player in the club's history to score four goals in an official match. He became the captain of the team for almost 15 years. He formed an attacking duo with his teammate and best friend, Antonis Antoniadis. In the Cup final in 1969, he scored a free kick against Olympiacos and after the 1–1, on a flip of a coin during extra time, he chose correctly and his team was awarded the title. He led Panathinaikos, under Ferenc Puskás, to the Final of the European Cup at Wembley Stadium against Ajax on 2 June 1971 where they lost 2–0. In December of the same year, he also participated in the two-legged final of the Intercontinental Cup against Nacional where they lost 3–2 on aggregate. He was nominated for the Ballon d'Or in 1969 and 1971. Another remarkable moment of his career was in 1977 when Panathinaikos won the Balkans Cup, even though he did not compete in the double final against Slavia Sofia.

On 17 March 1974, in a decisive derby against Olympiacos, Domazos scored a stunning bicycle kick and equalized in the final 1–1. Domazos won nine Championships, three Cups and one Balkan Cup, including two domestic doubles in 1969 and 1977, all at Panathinaikos. In 1978, a conflict with the administrative agent Antonis Mantzavelakis occurred, which caused Domazos, after 498 games in Panathinaikos, 134 goals and 19 years in the team, to part ways with the 'Greens'. He was later called a "finished player".

=== AEK Athens ===
In the summer of 1978, the owner of AEK Athens, Loukas Barlos approached Domazos offering a contract. Barlos, before signing him, called the captain of the club, Mimis Papaioannou to his office to get an "approval" for the transfer. Papaioannou agreed with the transfer and on 13 July Domazos officially signed for AEK Athens with a public presentation by Barlos. He started his first season with 29 appearances and 5 goals. He scored his first goal in a brace against PAOK on 10 September 1978.

On 8 April 1979, he faced his former club, in a 1–0 win and before the end of the first half, there was a fight between the players. After a foul of Panathinaikos, Panathinaikos player and former teammate, Álvarez spoke out against Domazos, accusing him of spitting at him while threatening. Domazos responded the following day accepting the charges and challenging him to a fight. At AEK he won another league title and offered to renew his contract for another year. In December, he requested from Barlos his desire to return to Panathinaikos and finish his career, which the first accepted.

=== Retirement ===
On 24 December 1979, Domazos made his return to the club where he was cherished. He may not have scored in the 12 matches he played in, but he proved that no matter how many years had passed, he still had plenty of mental and physical strength, with his leading presence in the winning derby against Olympiacos at home, on 13 January 1980. Ηe ended his career in the summer of 1980 with a record of 536 appearances and 139 goals.

== International career ==
Domazos made his debut with Greece on 2 December 1959 against Denmark in a 3–1 defeat at Leoforos. His last match was on 11 November 1980, at the same stadium in a friendly match against Australia, in a 3–3 draw, in which he was honored for his many years of contribution to the national team and Greek football in general. In this specific match, he scored his last goal, which makes him the oldest player to ever score for Greece, since in less than three months he would have turned 39. He was the National team captain during these years. In total, he was capped 50 times and scored four goals.

== Personal life and death ==
Domazos was married to the late Vicky Moscholiou, a popular singer, from 1967 to 1978. The couple had two daughters. In 1978, he met Argyro (Io) Theodorou and, after 4 years, they got married in the holy church of Agia Filothei in a closed family circle with best men the famous singer Giannis Parios and his wife Dina as well as captain Philippas Axiotis. They have a daughter, Theopi (Popi) Domazou, the journalist and municipal councilor of Athens since 2019, a former President of DAEM, and former President of the radio station Athens 9,84. In 2016, Domazos presented the book-album titled Mimis Domazos: secrets and Other Revelations, which mentions many incidents from his great career, while it is full of rare photographs. With his book, which became a best seller, he traveled throughout Greece together with his daughter Theopi (Popi) Domazou, where she presented it. After retirement, he was a businessman and often wrote opinion columns for Greek sports newspapers. He died on 24 January 2025 at age 83.

His body was placed in public veneration on the morning of 27 January in the chapel of the Metropolitan Cathedral of Athens before his funeral, while earlier the hearse containing his body stopped outside the Apostolos Nikolaidis Stadium for a few minutes. He was buried in the First Cemetery of Athens.

== Career statistics ==
=== Club ===
Appearances and goals by club, season and competition
Club	Season	League			Greek Cup		Continental		Other		Total	
Club	Season	Division	Apps	Goals	Apps	Goals	Apps	Goals	Apps	Goals	Apps	Goals
Panathinaikos	1959–60	Alpha Ethniki	29	7			0	0	0	0	29	7
Panathinaikos	1960–61	Alpha Ethniki	30	8			2 (Note: Appearances in European Cup)	0	0	0	40	8
Panathinaikos	1961–62	Alpha Ethniki	27	16			2	0	0	—	29	16
Panathinaikos	1962–63	Alpha Ethniki	28	7			2	0	0	0	30	7
Panathinaikos	1963–64	Alpha Ethniki	27	5			0	0	0	0	27	5
Panathinaikos	1964–65	Alpha Ethniki	19	5			4	0	0	0	23	5
Panathinaikos	1965–66	Alpha Ethniki	30	11			4	2	0	0	34	13
Panathinaikos	1966–67	Alpha Ethniki	19	6			0	0	0	0	19	6
Panathinaikos	1967–68	Alpha Ethniki	34	9			2 (Note: Appearances in European Cup Winners' Cup)	0	0	0	36	9
Panathinaikos	1968–69	Alpha Ethniki	32	5			4 (Note: Appearances in Inter-Cities Fairs Cup)	0	4	0	40	5
Panathinaikos	1969–70	Alpha Ethniki	30	6			2	0	0	0	32	6
Panathinaikos	1970–71	Alpha Ethniki	32	20			9	1	2 (Note: Appearances in Intercontinental Cup)	0	43	20
Panathinaikos	1971–72	Alpha Ethniki	30	5			2	0	0	0	32	5
Panathinaikos	1972–73	Alpha Ethniki	21	6			2	0	0	0	23	6
Panathinaikos	1973–74	Alpha Ethniki	27	7			1 (Note: Appearances in UEFA Cup)	0	0	0	28	7
Panathinaikos	1974–75	Alpha Ethniki	29	6			2	0	0	0	31	6
Panathinaikos	1975–76	Alpha Ethniki	15	3			1	0	0	0	16	3
Panathinaikos	1976–77	Alpha Ethniki	26	2			0	0	0	0	26	2
Panathinaikos	1977–78	Alpha Ethniki	5	0			2	0	0	0	7	0
Panathinaikos	Total		490	134			41	3	6	0	537+	137+
AEK Athens	1978–79	Alpha Ethniki	29	5	4	0	2	0	0	0	35	5
AEK Athens	1979–80	Alpha Ethniki	5	0	1	0	1	0	0	0	7	0
AEK Athens	Total		34	5	5	0	3	0	0	0	42	5
Panathinaikos	1979–80	Alpha Ethniki	12	0			0	0	0	—	12	0
Career total			536	139			43	3	6	0	585+	142+

== Honours ==
Panathinaikos

- Alpha Ethniki: 1959–60, 1960–61, 1961–62, 1963–64, 1964–65, 1968–69, 1969–70, 1971–72, 1976–77
- Greek Cup: 1966–67, 1968–69, 1976–77
- Balkans Cup: 1977

AEK Athens

- Alpha Ethniki: 1978–79

Records

- Most league appearances in Greece, with 536 official matches (502 with Panathinaikos and 34 with AEK Athens).
- Longest-active footballer in the history of Greek football, having played for more than 21 years. (1959–1980)
- He scored a total of 139 goals in his career, at league games, (134 with Panathinaikos and 5 with AEK Athens), which scored:
  - 124 by shots
  - 7 by free kicks
  - 2 by headers
  - 6 by penalty kicks
