= Greece national football team results (1960–1979) =

This article provides details of international football games played by the Greece national football team from 1960 to 1979.

== Results ==
Key
Win
Draw
Defeat

=== 1960 ===
6 March 1960 Football at the 1960 Summer Olympics qualification	Israel	2–1	Greece	Tel Aviv, Israel
	Menchel 49'; Glazer 86'		Linoxilakis 6'	Stadium: Ramat Gan Stadium

3 April 1960 Football at the 1960 Summer Olympics qualification	Greece	2–1	Israel	Athens, Greece
	Serafidis 66', 80'		Glazer 60'	Stadium: Leoforos Alexandras Stadium

24 April 1960 Football at the 1960 Summer Olympics qualification	Greece	0–5	Yugoslavia	Athens, Greece
			Kostic 34'; Zanetic 66'; Takac 68'; Mujic 81'; Knez 83'	Stadium: Leoforos Alexandras Stadium; Attendance: 20,000; Referee: Dimitar Rmenchev (Bulgaria)

3 July 1960 Friendly International	Denmark	7–2	Greece	Copenhagen, Denmark
	Nielsen 16'; 34' 47' 86': Enoksen 51', 90'; Pedersen 89'		Loukanidis 34', 54'	Stadium: Idrætspark; Attendance: 32,000; Referee: Leo Horn (Netherlands)

20 November 1960 1962 FIFA World Cup Qualification	Greece	0–3	West Germany	Athens, Greece
			Dörfel 10'; Brülls 29'; Haller 43'	Stadium: Leoforos Alexandras Stadium; Attendance: 25,000; Referee: Emil Erlih (Slovenia)

11 December 1960 Friendly International	France	0–0	Greece	Nice, France
				Stadium: Stade du Ray; Attendance: 12,000; Referee: Othmar Huber (Switzerland)

=== 1961 ===
3 May 1961 1962 FIFA World Cup Qualification	Greece	2–1	Northern Ireland	Athens, Greece
	Papaemmanouil 8', 64'		Polychroniou 81' (o.g.)	Stadium: Leoforos Alexandras Stadium; Attendance: 12,942; Referee: Reuben Priesner (Israel)

17 October 1961 1962 FIFA World Cup Qualification	Northern Ireland	2–0	Greece	Belfast, Northern Ireland
	McLaughlin 28', 57'			Stadium: Windsor Park; Attendance: 21,250; Referee: Pietro Bonetto (Italy)

22 October 1961 1962 FIFA World Cup Qualification	West Germany	2–1	Greece	Augsburg, West Germany
	Seeler 6', 26'		Papaemmanouil 59'	Stadium: Rosenaustadion; Attendance: 43,000; Referee: Birger Nilsen (Norway)

=== 1962 ===
18 October 1962 Friendly International	Greece	3–2	Ethiopia	Athens, Greece
	Papaemmanouil 13'; Nestoridis 15'; G. Deimezis 53'		Vassalo 50'; Worku 78'	Stadium: Nikos Goumas Stadium; Attendance: 10,123; Referee: Alexandros Monastiriotis (Greece)

=== 1963 ===
22 May 1963 Friendly International	Poland	4–0	Greece	Warsaw, Poland
	Brychzy 16', 33'; J. Galeczka 28', 51'			Stadium: Stadion Dziesięciolecia; Attendance: 30,000; Referee: Alois Obtulovic (Czech Republic)

16 October 1963 Friendly International	Greece	3–1	Poland	Athens, Greece
	Loukanidis 7'; Sideris 20'; Petridis 66'		Papoulidis 58' (o.g.)	Stadium: Leoforos Alexandras Stadium; Attendance: 20,268; Referee: Faruk Talu (Turkey)

27 November 1963 Friendly International	Cyprus	3–1	Greece	Nicosia, Cyprus
	Pakkos 10'; Krystallis 55', 63'		Domazos 15' (pen.)	Stadium: GSP Stadium; Attendance: 11,000; Referee: Michalakis Kiriakides (Cyprus)

=== 1964 ===
12 February 1964 Football at the 1964 Summer Olympics qualification	England	2–1	Greece	London, England
	T. Lawrence 31'; Buchanan 37'		Papaioannou 49'	Attendance: Stamford Bridge

8 April 1964 Football at the 1964 Summer Olympics qualification	Greece	4–1	England	Piraeus, Greece
	S. Mavridis 3'; Papaioannou 75', 85'; Papazoglou 83'		Buchanan 72'	Stadium: Karaiskakis Stadium

13 May 1964 Friendly International	Greece	3–1	Ethiopia	Athens, Greece
	Papazoglou 12', 26'; D. Taktikos 77'		Worku 43'	Stadium: Leoforos Alexandras Stadium; Attendance: 4,764; Referee: Alexandros Monastiriotis (Greece)

29 November 1964 1966 FIFA World Cup Qualification	Greece	4–2	Denmark	Athens, Greece
	Sideris 23', 46'; Papaioannou 74', 85'		Berg 60'; Madsen 72'	Stadium: Leoforos Alexandras Stadium; Attendance: 20,506; Referee: István Zsolt (Hungary)

9 December 1964 1966 FIFA World Cup Qualification	Greece	2–0	Wales	Athens, Greece
	Papaioannou 4'; Papaemmanouil 47'			Stadium: Leoforos Alexandras Stadium; Attendance: 20,663; Referee: Waclav Majdan (Poland)

=== 1965 ===
23 February 1965 Friendly International	Greece	1–2	Bulgaria	Athens, Greece
	Papaemmanouil 51'		Apostolov 57'; Debarski 85'	Stadium: Leoforos Alexandras Stadium; Attendance: 15,431; Referee: Nikos Giannopoulos (Greece)

17 March 1965 1966 FIFA World Cup Qualification	Wales	4–1	Greece	Cardiff, Wales
	Allchurch 26', 74'; England 51'; Vernon 65'		Papaioannou 3'	Stadium: Ninian Park; Attendance: 11,159; Referee: Piet Roomer (Netherlands)

23 May 1965 1966 FIFA World Cup Qualification	Soviet Union	3–1	Greece	Moscow, USSR
	Kazakov 14'; Ivanov 71', 83'		Papaioannou 60'	Stadium: Lenin Stadium; Attendance: 79,641; Referee: Erik Beijar (Finland)

3 October 1965 1966 FIFA World Cup Qualification	Greece	1–4	Soviet Union	Piraeus, Greece
	Papaioannou 27'		Metreveli 14'; Banishevskiy 25', 59', 82'	Stadium: Karaiskakis Stadium; Attendance: 39,880; Referee: Aharon Shoshani (Israel)

27 October 1965 1966 FIFA World Cup Qualification	Denmark	1–1	Greece	Copenhagen, Denmark
	Fritsen 12'		Sideris 44'	Stadium: Idrætspark; Attendance: 28,018; Referee: Owen McCarthy (Ireland)

=== 1966 ===
16 October 1966 UEFA Euro 1968 qualifying	Greece	2–1	Finland	Thessaloniki, Greece
	Alexiadis 39', 86'		Mäkipää 57'	Stadium: Kaftanzoglio Stadium; Attendance: 28,478; Referee: Zdenek Vales (Czech Republic)

=== 1967 ===
15 February 1967 Friendly International	Greece	4–0	Libya	Athens, Greece
	Sideris 18', 60'; Gioutsos 20', 61'			Stadium: Leoforos Alexandras Stadium; Attendance: 5,826; Referee: Epaminondas Chatzinikolaou (Greece)

8 March 1967 Friendly International	Greece	1–2	Romania	Athens, Greece
	Sideris 3'		I.G. Ionescu 34', 75'	Stadium: Leoforos Alexandras Stadium; Attendance: 16,879; Referee: Nikos Giannopoulos (Greece)

10 May 1967 UEFA Euro 1968 qualifying	Finland	1–1	Greece	Helsinki, Finland
	Peltonen 18'		Chaitas 39'	Stadium: Helsinki Olympic Stadium; Attendance: 14,056; Referee: Piet Roomer (Netherlands)

16 July 1967 UEFA Euro 1968 qualifying	Soviet Union	4–0	Greece	Tbilisi, USSR
	Banishevskiy 50', 57'; Sabo 72'; Chislenko 83'			Stadium: Dinamo Arena; Attendance: 28,040; Referee: Birger Nielsen (Denmark)

4 October 1967 UEFA Euro 1968 qualifying	Greece	4–1	Austria	Piraeus, Greece
	Sideris 28', 34', 62'; Papaioannou 75'		Grausam 61'	Stadium: Karaiskakis Stadium; Attendance: 34,552; Referee: Vasile Dumitrescu (Romania)

31 October 1967 UEFA Euro 1968 qualifying	Greece	0–1	Soviet Union	Piraeus, Greece
			Banishevskiy 51'	Stadium: Karaiskakis Stadium; Attendance: 33,588; Referee: Gottfried Dienst (Switzerland)

5 November 1967 UEFA Euro 1968 qualifying	Austria	1–1	Greece	Vienna, Austria
	Siber 31'		Sideris 71'	Stadium: Praterstadion; Attendance: 31,969; Referee: Gyula Gere (Hungary)

=== 1968 ===
12 October 1968 1970 FIFA World Cup qualification	Switzerland	1–0	Greece	Basel, Switzerland
	Quentin 51'			Stadium: St. Jakob-Park; Attendance: 35,778; Referee: Ad Boogaerts (Netherlands)

21 November 1968 Friendly International	Greece	4–1	Egypt	Athens, Greece
	Papaioannou 29'; Aidiniou 31'; Dedes 53', 65'		M. Reyad 58'	Stadium: Nikos Goumas Stadium; Attendance: 10,010; Referee: Vangelis Pazaropoulos (Greece)

11 December 1968 1970 FIFA World Cup qualification	Greece	4–2	Portugal	Piraeus, Greece
	Papaioannou 33'; Dedes 39'; José Augusto 49' (o.g.); Sideris 61'		José Augusto 18'; Eusébio 64'	Stadium: Karaiskakis Stadium; Attendance: 36,750; Referee: Gerhard Schulenburg (West Germany)

=== 1969 ===
12 March 1969 Friendly International	Israel	3–3	Greece	Tel Aviv, Israel
	Young 14'; Talbi 64'; Feigenbaum 72'		Gioutsos 8', 23', 48'	Stadium: Bloomfield Stadium; Attendance: 15,000; Referee: Vasile Dumitrescu (Romania)

16 April 1969 1970 FIFA World Cup qualification	Greece	2–2	Romania	Piraeus, Greece
	Sideris 51'; Dedes 60'		Dumitrache 54', 60'	Stadium: Karaiskakis Stadium; Attendance: 37,039; Referee: Antonio Sbardella (Italy)

4 May 1969 1970 FIFA World Cup qualification	Portugal	2–2	Greece	Oporto, Portugal
	Peres 82'; Eusébio 87'		Botinos 69'; Eleftherakis 74'	Stadium: Estádio das Antas; Attendance: 6,221; Referee: Moncef Ben Ali (Tunisia)

19 July 1969 Friendly International	Australia	1–0	Greece	Sydney, Australia
	Abonyi 60'			Stadium: Sydney Cricket Ground; Attendance: 30,155; Referee: Tony Boskovic (Australia)

23 July 1969 Friendly International	Australia	2–2	Greece	Brisbane, Australia
	Vojtek 48'; Baartz 62'		Dedes 17', 44'	Stadium: Brisbane Showgrounds; Attendance: 10,037; Referee: Harold Parsons (Australia)

27 July 1969 Friendly International	Australia	0–2	Greece	Melbourne, Australia
			Dedes 21'; Papaioannou 51'	Stadium: Olympic Park Stadium; Attendance: 24,416; Referee: Vince Dobinson (Australia)

15 October 1969 1970 FIFA World Cup qualification	Greece	4–1	Switzerland	Thessaloniki, Greece
	Koudas 33'; Botinos 40', 49'; Sideris 43'		Künzli 77'	Stadium: Kaftanzoglio Stadium; Attendance: 47,458; Referee: Paul Schiller (Austria)

16 November 1969 1970 FIFA World Cup qualification	Romania	1–1	Greece	Bucharest, Romania
	Dembrovschi 36'		Domazos 50'	Stadium: Lia Manoliu Stadium; Attendance: 62,577; Referee: John Adair (Northern Ireland

=== 1970 ===
11 October 1970 UEFA Euro 1972 qualifying	Malta	1–1	Greece	Gżira, Malta
	W. Vassallo 66'		Kritikopoulos 80'	Stadium: Empire Stadium; Attendance: 8,689; Referee: Rosario Lo Bello (Italy)

28 October 1970 Friendly International	Spain	2–1	Greece	Zaragoza, Spain
	Aragonés 22'; Quini 69'		Papaioannou 87'	Stadium: La Romareda; Attendance: 6,851; Referee: René Vigliani (France)

17 November 1970 Friendly International	Greece	1–3	Australia	Athens, Greece
	Eleftherakis 20'		Alston 11'; Mackay 23'; Blues 77'	Stadium: Leoforos Alexandras Stadium; Attendance: 15,000; Referee: Nikos Giannopoulos (Greece)

22 November 1970 Friendly International	Greece	1–3	West Germany	Piraeus, Greece
	Gioutsos 52'		Netzer 30'; Grabowski 42'; Beckenbauer 74'	Stadium: Karaiskakis Stadium; Attendance: 40,000; Referee: Alexandru Pirvu (Romania)

9 December 1970 Friendly International	Greece	1–1	Cyprus	Piraeus, Greece
	Papaioannou 35'		Stylianou 56'	Stadium: Karaiskakis Stadium; Attendance: 9,125; Referee: Christos Michas (Greece)

16 December 1970 UEFA Euro 1972 qualifying	Greece	0–1	Switzerland	Piraeus, Greece
			Müller 84'	Stadium: Karaiskakis Stadium; Attendance: 30,699; Referee: Milivoje Gugulovic (Yugoslavia)

=== 1971 ===
7 April 1971 Friendly	Greece	0–1	Bulgaria	Piraeus, Greece
			Vasilev 62'	Stadium: Karaiskakis Stadium; Attendance: 17,362; Referee: Gheorge Limona (Romania)

21 April 1971 UEFA Euro 1972 qualifying	England	3–0	Greece	London, England
	Chivers 23'; Hurst 68'; Lee 87'			Stadium: Wembley Stadium; Attendance: 55,123; Referee: Martti Hirviniemi (Finland)

12 May 1971 UEFA Euro 1972 qualifying	Switzerland	1–0	Greece	Bern, Switzerland
	Odermatt 76'			Stadium: Stadion Wankdorf; Attendance: 32,770; Referee: Iorwerth Jones (Wales)

18 June 1971 UEFA Euro 1972 qualifying	Greece	2–0	Malta	Piraeus, Greece
	Davourlis 60'; Aidiniou 80'			Stadium: Karaiskakis Stadium; Attendance: 9,561; Referee: István Zsolt (Hungary)

6 July 1971 Friendly	Mexico	1–1	Greece	Mexico City, Mexico
	Estrada 3'		Davourlis 87'	Stadium: Estadio Azteca; Attendance: 40,000; Referee: Alfonso González (Mexico)

30 September 1971 Friendly	Greece	0–1	Mexico	Thessaloniki, Greece
			Borja 22'	Stadium: Kaftanzoglio Stadium; Attendance: 8,561; Referee: Efstathios Papavasiliou (Greece)

17 November 1971 Friendly	Bulgaria	2–2	Greece	Sofia, Bulgaria
	Vasilev 73'; Kirilov 86'		Antoniadis 62'; Papaioannou 87'	Stadium: Vasil Levski National Stadium; Attendance: 15,000; Referee: Victor Padureanu (Romania)

1 December 1971 UEFA Euro 1972 qualifying	Greece	0–2	England	Piraeus, Greece
			Hurst 59'; Chivers 90'	Stadium: Karaiskakis Stadium; Attendance: 34,014; Referee: José Maria Ortiz de Mendibil (Spain)

=== 1972 ===
16 February 1972 Friendly	Greece	0–5	Netherlands	Piraeus, Greece
			Hulshoff 4', 49'; Cruyff 56', 82'; Neeskens 60'	Stadium: Karaiskakis Stadium; Attendance: 8,654; Referee: Josip Strmečki (Yugoslavia)

4 March 1972 Friendly	Greece	2–1	Italy	Piraeus, Greece
	Antoniadis 12'; Pomonis 55'		Boninsegna 19'	Stadium: Karaiskakis Stadium; Attendance: 15,000; Referee: Liuben Radunchev (Bulgaria)

12 April 1972 Friendly	Greece	0–0	Spain	Thessaloniki, Greece
				Stadium: Kaftanzoglio Stadium; Attendance: 25,000; Referee: Marijan Raus (Yugoslavia)

7 May 1972 Friendly	Ethiopia	0–1	Greece	Addis Ababa, Ethiopia
			A. Spyridon 24'	Stadium: Haile Selassie Stadium; Attendance: 10,000

2 September 1972 Friendly	Greece	1–3	France	Piraeus, Greece
	Sarafis 85'		Michel 67'; Revelli 86'; Larqué 90'	Stadium: Karaiskakis Stadium; Attendance: 10,000; Referee: Fulvio Pieroni (Italy)

19 November 1972 1974 FIFA World Cup qualification	Yugoslavia	1–0	Greece	Belgrade, Yugoslavia
	Acimovic 13'			Stadium: Red Star Stadium; Attendance: 60,104; Referee: Kurt Tschenscher (West Germany)

=== 1973 ===
17 January 1973 1974 FIFA World Cup qualification	Greece	2–3	Spain	Athens, Greece
	Koudas 59'; Domazos 82'		Valdez 40', 85'; Claramunt 71'	Stadium: Leoforos Alexandras Stadium; Attendance: 16,579; Referee: Rudolf Glöckner (West Germany)

31 January 1973 Friendly	Greece	2–2	Bulgaria	Athens, Greece
	Sarafis 13'; Eleftherakis 17'		Petkov 31'; Bonev 37'	Stadium: Nikos Goumas Stadium; Attendance: 22,000; Referee: Fulvio Pieroni (Italy)

21 February 1973 1974 FIFA World Cup qualification	Spain	3–1	Greece	Málaga, Spain
	Claramunt 29'; Sol 38'; Martínez 77'		Antoniadis 37'	Stadium: La Rosaleda; Attendance: 20,569; Referee: Michel Kitabdjian (France)

8 September 1973 Friendly	France	3–1	Greece	Paris, France
	Jouve 9'; Berdoll 59'; Chiesa 72'		Aidiniou 66'	Stadium: Parc des Princes; Attendance: 30,237; Referee: Paolo Toselli (Italy)

19 December 1973 1974 FIFA World Cup qualification	Greece	2–4	Yugoslavia	Piraeus, Greece
	Eleftherakis 29'; Katalinski 44' (o.g)		Bajević 12'; Karasi 15', 90+1'; Šurjak 62'	Stadium: Karaiskakis Stadium; Attendance: 7,768; Referee: Kurt Tschenscher (West Germany)

=== 1974 ===
28 April 1974 Friendly	Brazil	0–0	Greece	Rio de Janeiro, Brazil
				Stadium: Maracanã Stadium; Attendance: 86,499; Referee: Robert Wurtz (France)

15 May 1974 Friendly	Poland	2–0	Greece	Warsaw, Poland
	Lato 32'; Jakóbczak 77'			Stadium: Stadion Dziesięciolecia; Attendance: 15,000

29 May 1974 Friendly	Romania	3–1	Greece	Bucharest, Romania
	Iordanescu 2', 32'; Lucescu 85'		Sarafis 11'	Stadium: Stadionul August 23; Attendance: 40,000; Referee: Ziya Türkdogan (Turkey)

13 October 1974 UEFA Euro 1976 qualifying	Bulgaria	3–3	Greece	Sofia, Bulgaria
	Bonev 1'; Denev 28', 30'		Antoniadis 29'; Papaioannou 86'; Glezos 88'	Stadium: Vasil Levski National Stadium; Attendance: 14,291; Referee: Alberto Michelotti (Italy)

15 November 1974 Friendly	Greece	3–1	Cyprus	Piraeus, Greece
	Papaioannou 30'; Sarafis 35'; Terzanidis 89'		Pamboullis 22'	Stadium: Karaiskakis Stadium; Attendance: 10,000

20 November 1974 UEFA Euro 1976 qualifying	Greece	2–2	West Germany	Piraeus, Greece
	Delikaris 13'; Sarafis 70'		Cullmann 51'; Wimmer 82'	Stadium: Karaiskakis Stadium; Attendance: 11,425; Referee: Nicolae Rainea (Romania)

18 December 1974 UEFA Euro 1976 qualifying	Greece	2–1	Bulgaria	Pireaus, Greece
	Sarafis 4'; Antoniadis 40'		Kolev 88'	Stadium: Karaiskakis Stadium; Attendance: 22,328; Referee: Paul Schiller (Austria)

=== 1975 ===
23 February 1975 UEFA Euro 1976 qualifying	Malta	2–0	Greece	Gżira, Malta
	R. Aquilina 33'; V. Magro 79'			Stadium: Empire Stadium; Attendance: 8,621; Referee: Robert Matthewson (England)

1 April 1975 Friendly	Cyprus	1–2	Greece	Nicosia, Cyprus
	Konstantinou 20'		Kritikopoulos 7'; Anastasiadis 35'	Stadium: GSP Stadium; Attendance: 12,000; Referee: Sotos Afxentiou (Cyprus)

4 June 1975 UEFA Euro 1976 qualifying	Greece	4–0	Malta	Thessaloniki, Greece
	Mavros 32'; Antoniadis 34'; Iosifidis 47'; Papaioannou 50'			Stadium: Toumba Stadium; Attendance: 16,545; Referee: Marijan Raus (Yugoslavia)

24 September 1975 Friendly	Greece	1–1	Romania	Thessaloniki, Greece
	Sarafis 84'		Liță 27'	Stadium: Kaftanzoglio Stadium; Attendance: 15,000; Referee: Milos Cajic (Yugoslavia)

11 October 1975 UEFA Euro 1976 qualifying	West Germany	1–1	Greece	Düsseldorf, West Germany
	Heynckes 68'		Delikaris 78'	Stadium: Rheinstadion; Attendance: 61,252; Referee: Clive Thomas (Wales)

30 December 1975 Friendly	Italy	3–2	Greece	Florence, Italy
	Pulici 6', 45'; Savoldi 61'		Kritikopoulos 34'; Sarafis 53'	Stadium: Stadio Artemio Franchi; Attendance: 26.585; Referee: Milos Kajic (Yugoslavia)

=== 1976 ===
6 May 1976 Friendly	Greece	1–0	Poland	Athens, Greece
	Koudas 24'			Stadium: Leoforos Alexandras Stadium; Attendance: 18,000

22 September 1976 Friendly	Greece	0–1	Israel	Patras, Greece
			Tabak 58'	Stadium: Panachaiki Stadium; Attendance: 5,000; Referee: Milos Cajic (Yugoslavia)

9 October 1976 1978 FIFA World Cup qualification	Greece	1–1	Hungary	Piraeus, Greece
	Papaioannou 68'		Nyilasi 84'	Stadium: Karaiskakis Stadium; Attendance: 25.255; Referee: Franz Wöhrer (Austria)

10 November 1976 Friendly	Greece	0–3	Austria	Kavala, Greece
			Hickersberger 11'; Krankl 62'; Pezzey 86'	Stadium: Kavala National Stadium; Attendance: 7,589; Referee: Atanas Mateev (Bulgaria)

=== 1977 ===
26 January 1977 Friendly	Israel	1–1	Greece	Ramat Gan, Israel
	Schweitzer 87'		Galakos 1'	Stadium: Ramat Gan Stadium; Attendance: 7,000; Referee: Jan Redelfs (West Germany)

9 March 1977 Friendly	Austria	2–0	Greece	Vienna, Austria
	Sara 32'; Schachner 54'			Stadium: Praterstadion; Attendance: 25,000; Referee: Josef Pouček (Czech Republic)

23 March 1977 Friendly	Czechoslovakia	4–0	Greece	Prague, Czechoslovakia
	Panenka 8'; Nehoda 17'; Gögh 18'; Masny 56'			Stadium: Stadion Letná; Attendance: 15,000; Referee: Alojzy Jarguz (Poland)

24 April 1977 1978 FIFA World Cup qualification	Soviet Union	2–0	Greece	Moscow, USSR
	Konkov 26'; Kipiani 77'			Stadium: Lenin Stadium; Attendance: 50,000; Referee: Jean Dubach (Switzerland)

10 May 1977 1978 FIFA World Cup qualification	Greece	1–0	Soviet Union	Thessaloniki, Greece
	Papaioannou 58'			Stadium: Kaftanzoglio Stadium; Attendance: 30,000; Referee: Cesare Gussoni (Italy)

28 May 1977 1978 FIFA World Cup qualification	Hungary	3–0	Greece	Budapest, Hungary
	Pusztai 13'; Nyilasi 15'; Fazekas 87'			Stadium: Népstadion; Attendance: 75,000; Referee: Jan Beck (Netherlands)

21 September 1977 Friendly	Romania	6–1	Greece	Bucharest, Romania
	Liță 7', 32', 87'; Bölöni 22', 42'; Georgescu 80'		Karavitis 28'	Stadium: Stadionul August 23; Attendance: 15,000; Referee: René Vigliani (France)

26 October 1977 Friendly	Bulgaria	0–0	Greece	Sofia, Bulgaria
				Stadium: Vasil Levski National Stadium; Attendance: 15,000; Referee: Constantin Dinulescu (Romania)

16 November 1977 Friendly	Greece	0–0	Yugoslavia	Thessaloniki, Greece
				Stadium: Kleanthis Vikelidis Stadium; Attendance: 20,000

=== 1978 ===
11 January 1978 Friendly International	Cyprus	0–2	Greece	Nicosia, Cyprus
			Delikaris 21'; Livathinos 34'	Stadium: GSP Stadium; Attendance: 8,356; Referee: Stefanos Chatzistefanou (Cyprus)

15 February 1978 Friendly International	Greece	1–1	Austria	Athens, Greece
	Galakos 40'		Krankl 59'	Stadium: Nikos Goumas Stadium; Attendance: 11,297; Referee: Domenico Serafino (Italy)

22 March 1978 Friendly International	Greece	0–1	Czechoslovakia	Thessaloniki, Greece
			Kroupa 40'	Stadium: Kaftanzoglio Stadium; Attendance: 15,000; Referee: Dimitar Parmakov (Bulgaria)

5 April 1978 Friendly International	Poland	5–2	Greece	Poznań, Poland
	Lato 11'; Deyna 18', 32'; Żmuda 20'; Boniek 47'		Karavitis 54'; Mavros 78'	Stadium: Stadion im. 22 lipca Attendance: 10,000; Referee: Constantin Dinulescu (Romania)

24 May 1978 UEFA Euro 1980 qualifying	Finland	3–0	Greece	Helsinki, Finland
	Ismail 35', 82'; Nieminen 80'			Stadium: Olympic Stadium; Attendance: 7,740; Referee: Hans Einbeck (West Germany)

11 June 1978 Friendly International	Australia	1–2	Greece	Melbourne, Australia
	Cole 62'		Yfantidis 63', 78'	Stadium: Olympic Park Stadium; Attendance: 25,000; Referee: Peter Rampley (Australia)

14 June 1978 Friendly International	Australia	0–1	Greece	Adelaide, Australia
			Yfantidis 70'	Stadium: Hindmarsh Stadium; Attendance: 9,502; Referee: Donald Campbell (Australia)

18 June 1978 Friendly International	Australia	1–1	Greece	Sydney, Australia
	Barnes 12'		Kravaritis 77'	Stadium: Sydney Cricket Ground; Attendance: 15,000; Referee: Davis Yelland (Australia)

20 September 1978 UEFA Euro 1980 qualifying	Soviet Union	2–0	Greece	Yerevan, USSR
	Chesnokov 20'; Bezsonov 53'			Stadium: Hrazdan Stadium; Attendance: 50,000; Referee: John Carpenter (Ireland)

11 October 1978 UEFA Euro 1980 qualifying	Greece	8–1	Finland	Athens, Greece
	Nikoloudis 15', 25'; Delikaris 23', 47'; Mavros 38', 44', 75'; Galakos 81'		A. Heiskainen 61'	Stadium: Leoforos Alexandras Stadium; Attendance: 9,000

29 October 1978 UEFA Euro 1980 qualifying	Greece	4–1	Hungary	Thessaloniki, Greece
	Galakos 58', 67'; Ardizoglou 71'; Mavros 89'		Várady 90+1'	Stadium: Kaftanzoglio Stadium; Attendance: 13,463; Referee: Nikola Dubin (Bulgaria)

15 November 1978 Balkan Cup 1977-1980	Yugoslavia	4–1	Greece	Skopje, Yugoslavia
	Halilhodzic 33', 80'; Savic 47'; Dzoni 58'		Mavros 31'	Stadium: Gradski stadion Attendance: 12,000; Referee: Bogdan Dochev (Bulgaria)

13 December 1978 Friendly International	Greece	2–1	Romania	Athens, Greece
	Koudas 43'; Nikoloudis 70'		Romilă 85'	Stadium: Leoforos Alexandras Stadium; Attendance: 6,259; Referee: Jan Peeters (Belgium)

=== 1979 ===
14 February 1979 Friendly International	Israel	4–1	Greece	Ramat Gan, Israel
15:00	Shum 21' (pen.); Peretz 29', 41', 80'		Delikaris 30'	Stadium: Ramat Gan Stadium; Attendance: 5,369; Referee: Toros Kibritjian (Syria)

21 March 1979 Friendly International	Romania	3–0	Greece	Bucharest, Romania
16:15	Liță 5'; Balaci 45'; Georgescus 83'			Stadium: Steaua Stadium; Attendance: 17,259; Referee: Spas Lukov (Bulgaria)

2 May 1979 UEFA Euro 1980 qualifying	Hungary	0–0	Greece	Budapest, Hungary
18:30				Stadium: Népstadion; Attendance: 13,332; Referee: John Homewood (England)

12 September 1979 UEFA Euro 1980 qualifying	Greece	1–0	Soviet Union	Athens, Greece
17:00	Nikoloudis 25'			Stadium: Leoforos Alexandras Stadium; Attendance: 25,000; Referee: António Garrido (Portugal)
