= 1977 Balkans Cup =

Tournament details
- Country: Balkans
- Teams: 6

Final positions
- Champions: (Greece) Panathinaikos
- Runners-up: (Bulgaria) Slavia Sofia

Tournament statistics
- Matches played: 14
- Goals scored: 47 (3.36 per match)

The 1977 Balkans Cup was an edition of the Balkans Cup, a football competition for representative clubs from the Balkan states. It was contested by 6 teams and Panathinaikos won the trophy.

== Group Stage ==
=== Group A ===
| Pos | Team | Pld | W | D | L | GF | GA | GR | Pts | Qualification |
|---|---|---|---|---|---|---|---|---|---|---|
| 1 | (Bulgaria) Slavia Sofia (A) | 4 | 4 | 0 | 0 | 15 | 0 | — | 8 | Advances to finals |
| 2 | (Romania) Politehnica Timișoara | 4 | 2 | 0 | 2 | 9 | 10 | 0.900 | 4 | |
| 3 | (Turkey) Altay | 4 | 0 | 0 | 4 | 4 | 18 | 0.222 | 0 | |

Source: rsssf.com
Rules for classification: 1) points; 2) goal average; 3) number of goals scored
(A) Advance to a further round
10 November 1976

| Slavia Sofia (Bulgaria) | 5–0 | (Romania) Politehnica Timișoara |

Slavia, Sofia

17 April 1977

| Politehnica Timișoara (Romania) | 5–2 | (Turkey) Altay |
|---|---|---|
| Anghel 33', 46'; Petrescu 45', 90'; Dembrovschi 83' (pen.) | | Muzaffer Etçil 17', 55' |

1 Mai, Timișoara

18 May 1977

| Altay (Turkey) | 0–3 | (Bulgaria) Slavia Sofia |
|---|---|---|
| | | Aleksandrov 37'; Grigorov 41'; Tsvetkov 70' |

Alsancak, İzmir

4 June 1977

| Slavia Sofia (Bulgaria) | 6–0 | (Turkey) Altay |
|---|---|---|
| Alexandrov; Grigerov; Monchev; Tsvetkov; Zhelyazkov; Grigerov |

Alsancak, İzmir

31 July 1977

| Altay (Turkey) | 2–4 | (Romania) Politehnica Timișoara |
|---|---|---|
| Togay 8'; Muzaffer Etçil 13' | | Anghel 7'; Emerich Dembrovschi 14'; Laţa 35'; Şerbănoiu 41' |

Alsancak, İzmir

16 August 1977

| Politehnica Timișoara (Romania) | 0–1 | (Bulgaria) Slavia Sofia |

1 Mai, Timișoara

=== Group B ===
| Pos | Team | Pld | W | D | L | GF | GA | GR | Pts | Qualification |
|---|---|---|---|---|---|---|---|---|---|---|
| 1 | (Greece) Panathinaikos (A) | 4 | 2 | 2 | 0 | 8 | 4 | 2.000 | 6 | Advances to finals |
| 2 | (Socialist Federal Republic of Yugoslavia) Budućnost Titograd | 4 | 1 | 2 | 1 | 6 | 5 | 1.200 | 4 | |
| 3 | (Albania) Vllaznia Shkodër | 4 | 0 | 2 | 2 | 2 | 7 | 0.286 | 2 | |

Source: rsssf.com
Rules for classification: 1) points; 2) goal average; 3) number of goals scored
(A) Advance to a further round
17 April 1977

| Vllaznia Shkodër (Albania) | 1–1 | (Greece) Panathinaikos |
|---|---|---|
| Basha 5' | | Vakalis 24' |

Vojo Kushi Stadium, Shkodër

27 April 1977

| Vllaznia Shkodër (Albania) | 1–1 | (Socialist Federal Republic of Yugoslavia) Budućnost Titograd |
|---|---|---|
| Paçrami 37' | | Vaso 22' (o.g.) |

Vojo Kushi Stadium, Shkodër

4 May 1977

| Budućnost Titograd (Socialist Federal Republic of Yugoslavia) | 2–0 | (Albania) Vllaznia Shkodër |
|---|---|---|
| Miročević; Radović |

Pod Goricom Stadium, Titograd

8 May 1977

| Panathinaikos (Greece) | 2–2 | (Socialist Federal Republic of Yugoslavia) Budućnost Titograd |
|---|---|---|
| Eleftherakis 39'; Antoniadis 87' | | Miročević 30'; Kovačević 48' |

Leoforos Alexandras Stadium, Athens

26 May 1977

| Panathinaikos (Greece) | 3–0 | (Albania) Vllaznia Shkodër |
|---|---|---|
| Giannakoulas 77', 90'; Papadimitriou 82' |

Leoforos Alexandras Stadium, Athens

17 August 1977

| Budućnost Titograd (Socialist Federal Republic of Yugoslavia) | 1–2 | (Greece) Panathinaikos |
|---|---|---|
| Kovačević 16' | | Papadimitriou 6'; Đorđević 66' |

Pod Goricom Stadium, Titograd

== Finals ==
| Team 1 | Agg. | Team 2 | 1st leg | 2nd leg |
|---|---|---|---|---|
| Slavia Sofia (Bulgaria) | 1–2 | (Greece) Panathinaikos | 0–0 | 1–2 |

=== First leg ===
14 December 1977

| Slavia Sofia (Bulgaria) | 0–0 | (Greece) Panathinaikos |

Slavia, Sofia
Attendance: 2,500

| Slavia Sofia | Panathinaikos |

| (Bulgaria) Georgi Gugalov |
| (Bulgaria) Georgi Dermendzhiev |
| (Bulgaria) Ivan Iliev |
| (Bulgaria) Milcho Evtimov |
| (Bulgaria) Ivan Chakarov |
| (Bulgaria) Vanyo Kostov |
| (Bulgaria) Iliyan Aliev |
| (Bulgaria) Andrey Zhelyazkov |
| (Bulgaria) Chavdar Tsvetkov |
| (Bulgaria) Atanas Aleksandrov |
| (Bulgaria) Bozhidar Grigorov |
Substitutes:
| (Bulgaria) Ivan Chakarov |
| (Bulgaria) |
Manager:
(Bulgaria) Atanas Parzhelov

(Greece) Vasilis Konstantinou
(Greece) Mitsos Dimitriou
(Greece) Giorgos Gonios
(Greece) Dimitris Kizas
(Greece) Takis Eleftheriadis
(Greece) Christos Terzanidis
(Greece) Spyros Livathinos
(Greece) Kostas Eleftherakis | (substituted off) 2'
(Greece) Babis Yfantis
(Argentina) Óscar Marcelino Álvarez
(Greece) Takis Papadimitriou
Substitutes:
(Greece) Odysseas Vakalis | (substituted on) 2' | (substituted off) 70'
(Greece) Kostas Vallidis | (substituted on) 70'
Manager:
(Poland) Kazimierz Górski

=== Second leg ===
15 March 1978

| Panathinaikos (Greece) | 2–1 | (Bulgaria) Slavia Sofia |
|---|---|---|
| Eleftherakis 14'; Vakalis 63' | | Minchev 45' |

Leoforos Alexandras Stadium, Athens
Attendance: 6,500
Referee: Marijan Rauš (Yugoslavia)

| Panathinaikos | Slavia Sofia |

(Greece) Vasilis Konstantinou
(Greece) Takis Eleftheriadis | (yellow card) 51'
(Greece) Stelios Stefanakis
(Greece) Giorgos Gonios
(Greece) Christos Giannakoulas
(Greece) Christos Terzanidis
(Greece) Odysseas Vakalis
(Greece) Spyros Livathinos
(Argentina) Óscar Marcelino Álvarez | (yellow card) 89'
(Greece) Kostas Eleftherakis | (substituted off) 79'
(Greece) Takis Papadimitriou | (substituted off) 46'
Substitutes:
(Greece) Lakis Katsiakos | (substituted on) 79'
(Greece) Kostas Vallidis | (substituted on) 46'
Manager:
(Poland) Kazimierz Górski

| (Bulgaria) Georgi Gugalov |
| (Bulgaria) Ivan Tsakarov | (substituted off) 85' |
| (Bulgaria) Georgi Dermendzhiev |
| (Bulgaria) Milcho Evtimov |
| (Bulgaria) Vanio Kostov | Sent off (straight red) |
| (Bulgaria) Ivan Iliev |
| (Bulgaria) Atanas Alexandrov |
| (Bulgaria) Iliyaz Aliev |
| (Bulgaria) Andrey Zhelyazkov |
| (Bulgaria) Georgi Minchev |
| (Bulgaria) Chavdar Tsvetkov | (substituted off) 82' |
Substitutes:
| (Bulgaria) Petar Miladinov | (substituted on) 85' |
| (Bulgaria) Bozhidar Grigorov | (substituted on) 82' |
Manager:
(Bulgaria) Atanas Parzhelov

Panathinaikos won 2–1 on aggregate.

== Goalscorers ==
6 goals

- (Bulgaria) Bozhidar Grigorov

4 goals

- (Bulgaria) Chavdar Tsvetkov

3 goals

- (Bulgaria) Atanas Aleksandrov
- (Turkey) Muzaffer Etcil
- (Romania) Stelian Anghel

2 goals

- (Greece) Kostas Eleftherakis
- (Greece) Odysseas Vakalis
- (Greece) Christos Giannakoulas
- (Greece) Takis Papadimitriou
- (Romania) Romulus Petrescu
- (Romania) Emerich Dembrovschi
- (Bulgaria) Georgi Minchev
- (Montenegro) Dragomir Kovačević

1 goal

- (Serbia) Borivoje Djordjevic
- (Greece) Antonis Antoniadis
- (Montenegro) Mojas Radonjic
- (Montenegro) Zarko Vukcevic
- (Montenegro) Anto Miročević
- (Albania) Lutfi Basha
- (Albania) Fatmir Pacrami
- (Romania) Dan Laţa
- (Romania) Gheorghe Șerbănoiu
- (Bulgaria) Andrey Zhelyazkov
- (Turkey) Erol Togay
