= List of Olympiacos F.C. seasons =

Here are the Olympiacos F.C. seasons which represent the period from 1959 until now, because that was the first year of National League system.

== Seasons ==
Season	Greek Super League																			Greek FA Cup	Greek FA Super Cup	European Competitions
Season	Total									Home					Away					Greek FA Cup	Greek FA Super Cup	European Competitions
Season	Pos	Pts	Pld	W	D	L	GF	GA	GD	W	D	L	GF	GA	W	D	L	GF	GA	Greek FA Cup	Greek FA Super Cup	European Competitions
1959–60	3	70	30	16	8	6	52	24	+28	10	2	3	31	12	6	6	3	21	12	Winners		EC-PR
1960–61	2	73	30	19	5	6	62	23	+39	13	2	0	42	8	6	3	6	20	15	Winners		
1961–62	2	78	30	22	4	4	65	23	+42	11	2	2	38	12	11	2	2	27	11	Runners-up		CWC-R1
1962–63	3	75	30	19	7	4	62	39	+23	12	2	1	39	21	7	5	3	23	18	Winners		CWC-PR
1963–64	2	77	30	20	7	3	62	17	+45	12	1	2	40	8	8	6	1	22	9	Semi-finals		CWC-R1
1964–65	3	71	30	18	5	7	73	40	+33	10	1	4	44	23	8	4	3	29	17	Winners		
1965–66	1	80	30	23	4	3	67	18	+49	12	2	1	34	9	11	2	2	33	9	Runners-up		CWC-R2
1966–67	1	79	30	21	7	2	59	17	+42	14	1	0	37	6	7	6	2	22	11	Quarter-finals		EC-R1
1967–68	2	80	34	21	4	9	63	32	+31	15	0	2	43	10	6	4	7	20	22	Winners		EC-R1
1968–69	2	88	34	24	6	4	77	21	+56	15	1	1	53	12	9	5	3	24	9	Runners-up		CWC-R2
1969–70	3	84	34	21	8	5	52	21	+31	13	3	1	32	10	8	5	4	20	11	Semi-finals		CWC-R1
1970–71	7	71	34	13	11	10	44	24	+20	11	2	4	35	11	2	9	6	9	13	Winners		
1971–72	2	83	34	20	9	5	61	33	+28	13	4	0	35	13	7	5	5	26	20	Round of 16		CWC-R1
1972–73	1	94	34	27	6	1	72	13	+59	15	2	0	45	4	12	4	1	27	9	Winners		UC-R2
1973–74	1	59	34	26	7	1	102	14	+88	16	1	0	69	6	10	6	1	33	8	Runners-up		EC-R1
1974–75	1	57	34	24	9	1	65	21	+44	15	2	0	44	11	9	7	1	21	10	Winners		EC-R2
1975–76	3	41	30	16	9	5	48	28	+20	12	0	3	35	15	4	9	2	13	13	Runners-up		EC-R1
1976–77	2	52	34	23	6	5	70	27	+43	14	3	0	48	13	9	3	5	22	14	Semi-finals		UC-R1
1977–78	4	44	34	17	10	7	46	20	+26	13	2	2	31	7	4	8	5	15	13	Semi-finals		UC-R1
1978–79	2	44	34	26	4	4	63	27	+36	15	1	1	36	8	11	3	3	27	19	Semi-finals		UC-R1
1979–80	1	47	34	20	7	7	49	21	+28	16	1	0	38	5	4	6	7	11	16	Round of 16		UC-R1
1980–81	1	49	34	20	9	5	47	18	+29	14	2	1	34	8	6	7	4	13	10	Winners		EC-R1
1981–82	1	50	34	18	14	2	46	21	+25	9	8	0	27	8	9	6	2	19	13	Round of 16		EC-R1
1982–83	1	50	34	20	10	4	50	22	+28	13	3	1	31	9	7	7	3	19	13	Quarter-finals		EC-R2
1983–84	2	43	30	19	5	6	49	22	+27	14	0	1	35	6	5	5	5	14	16	Round of 16		EC-R2
1984–85	4	42	30	17	8	5	53	23	+30	11	3	1	37	11	6	5	4	16	12	Round of 16		UC-R2
1985–86	5	34	30	14	6	10	57	42	+15	10	4	1	43	18	4	2	9	14	24	Runners-up		
1986–87	1	49	30	22	5	3	54	24	+30	13	1	1	30	8	9	4	2	24	16	Round of 16	Winners	CWC-R2
1987–88	8	31	30	9	13	8	39	41	-2	7	6	2	26	17	2	7	6	13	24	Runners-up		EC-R1
1988–89	2	41	30	16	9	5	54	25	+29	9	4	2	32	11	7	5	3	22	14	Round of 16		
1989–90	4	45	34	18	9	7	60	37	+23	14	1	2	42	15	4	8	5	18	22	Winners	Runners-up	UC-R3
1990–91	2	48	34	19	10	5	77	28	+49	13	3	1	54	12	6	7	4	23	16	Round of 32		CWC-R2
1991–92	2	51	34	20	11	3	74	30	+44	14	3	0	47	10	6	8	3	27	20	Winners	Winners	
1992–93	3	68	34	20	8	6	68	31	+37	14	2	1	41	10	6	6	5	27	21	Runners-up		CWC-QF
1993–94	3	68	34	18	14	2	63	27	+36	10	7	0	36	11	8	7	2	27	16	Quarter-finals		UC-R2
1994–95	2	67	34	20	7	7	69	31	+38	14	2	1	48	13	6	5	6	21	18	Quarter-finals		UC-R1
1995–96	3	65	34	19	8	7	66	34	+32	12	3	2	41	14	7	5	5	25	20	Round of 16		UC-R2
1996–97	1	84	34	26	6	2	72	14	+58	13	4	0	37	4	13	2	2	35	10	Quarter-finals		UC-R1
1997–98	1	88	34	29	1	4	88	27	+61	16	0	1	54	15	13	1	3	34	12	Round of 32		UCL-GS
1998–99	1	85	34	27	4	3	82	22	+60	13	4	0	44	9	14	0	3	38	13	Winners		UCL-QF
1999–2000	1	92	34	30	2	2	86	18	+68	16	1	0	54	9	14	1	2	32	9	Quarter-finals		UCL-FGS / UC-R3
2000–01	1	78	30	25	3	2	84	22	+62	14	1	0	47	9	11	2	2	37	13	Runners-up		UCL-FGS / UC-R3
2001–02	1	58	26	17	7	2	69	30	+39	9	3	1	38	11	8	4	1	31	19	Runners-up		UCL-FGS
2002–03	1	70	30	21	7	2	75	21	+54	12	2	1	40	8	9	5	1	35	13	Quarter-finals		UCL-FGS
2003–04	2	75	30	24	3	3	70	19	+51	11	2	2	38	9	13	1	1	32	10	Runners-up		UCL-FGS
2004–05	1	65	30	19	8	3	54	18	+36	13	2	0	33	6	6	6	3	21	12	Winners		UCL-FGS / UC-R16
2005–06	1	70	30	23	1	6	63	23	+40	13	1	1	39	8	10	0	5	24	15	Winners		UCL-GS
2006–07	1	71	30	22	5	3	62	23	+39	13	1	1	35	7	9	4	2	27	16	Quarter-finals	Winners	UCL-GS
2007–08	1	70	30	21	7	2	58	23	+35	13	2	0	32	9	8	5	2	26	14	Winners		UCL-R16
2008–09	1	71	30	22	5	3	50	14	+36	13	1	1	33	8	9	4	2	17	6	Winners		UCL-Q3 / UC-R32
2009–10	5	64	30	19	7	4	47	18	+29	9	4	2	26	10	10	3	2	21	8	Round of 32		UCL-R16
2010–11	1	73	30	24	1	5	65	18	+47	15	0	0	46	5	9	1	5	19	12	Quarter-finals		UEL-Q3
2011–12	1	73	30	23	4	3	70	17	+53	12	2	1	38	9	11	2	2	32	8	Winners		UCL-GS / UEL-R16
2012–13	1	77	30	24	5	1	64	16	+48	12	2	1	34	9	12	3	0	30	8	Winners		UCL-GS / UEL-R32
2013–14	1	86	30	28	2	4	88	19	+69	16	0	1	47	10	12	2	3	41	9	Semi-finals		UCL-R16
2014–15	1	77	34	24	6	4	79	23	+56	15	1	1	45	8	9	5	3	34	15	Winners		UCL-GS / UEL-R32
2015–16	1	85	30	28	1	1	81	16	+56	15	0	0	45	5	13	1	1	36	11	Runners-up		UCL-GS / UEL-R32
2016–17	1	67	30	21	4	5	57	16	+56	13	1	1	39	6	8	3	4	18	10	Semi-finals		UCL-Q3 / UEL-R16
2017–18	3	57	30	18	6	6	63	28	+35	11	2	2	34	10	7	4	4	29	18	Quarter-finals		UCL-GS
2018–19	2	75	30	24	3	3	71	17	+54	13	1	1	42	8	11	2	2	29	9	Quarter-finals		UEL-R32
2019–20	1	91	36	28	7	1	74	16	+58	16	1	1	44	9	12	6	0	30	7	Winners		UCL-GS / UEL-R16
2020–21	1	90	36	28	6	2	82	19	+63	17	1	0	43	4	11	5	2	39	15	Runners-up		UCL-GS / UEL-R16
2021–22	1	83	36	25	8	3	62	26	+36	13	4	1	32	12	12	4	2	30	14	Semi-finals		UCL-Q3 / UEL-KOR
2022–23	3	73	36	21	10	5	70	24	+46	12	4	2	43	12	9	6	3	27	12	Semi-finals		UCL-Q2 / UEL-GS
2023–24	3	74	36	23	5	8	78	36	+42	14	0	4	48	18	9	5	4	30	18	Round of 16		UEL-GS / UECL-W
2024–25	1	75	32	23	6	3	58	22	+36	12	4	0	32	13	11	2	3	26	9	Winners		UEL-R16

== Overall seasons table ==
Period	Win	Draw	Loss
Until 1992	2 pts	1 pt	0 pts
Later than 1992	3 pts	1 pt	0 pts

Total										Home					Away				
Division	Seasons	Pts	Pld	W	D	L	F	A	GD	W	D	L	F	A	W	D	L	F	A
Super League Greece	55	2805	1746	1151	383	242	3803	1360	+2143	705	124	59	2175	576	454	259	183	1328	784
