= Giorgos Gonios =

Greek footballer (1946–2026)

Personal information
- Date of birth: 22 December 1946
- Place of birth: Ilisia, Athens, Greece
- Date of death: 16 April 2026 (aged 79)
- Place of death: Athens, Greece
- Positions: Forward; defender

Senior career*
Years	Team	Apps	(Gls)
–1968	Agios Ierotheos		
1968–1979	Panathinaikos	253	(26)
1979–1988	A.O. Vouliagmeni		
- * Club domestic league appearances and goals

Giorgos Gonios (Greek: Γιώργος Γονιός; 22 December 1946 – 16 April 2026) was a Greek footballer who played as a defender. He is considered an important figure in the history of Greek football club Panathinaikos.

== Career ==
Gonios started his career as a forward at Agios Ierotheos, where he caught the attention of both Panathinaikos and Olympiacos. He eventually chose Panathinaikos, who he signed for in the summer of 1968. In his first season, he scored 20 goals for Panathinaikos, including 18 in the Alpha Ethniki. Later on, he started being played as a defender.

He was part of the Panathinaikos team that reached the 1971 European Cup final against Ajax, but he only played in one European Cup match that season, being a 5–0 win against Jeunesse Esch in the first round. He later captained the team when they won the 1977 Balkans Cup against Slavia Sofia. In total, he played 310 matches for Panathinaikos, scoring 31 goals, including 26 goals in 253 matches in the Alpha Ethniki.

Gonios left Panathinaikos in 1979, and joined A.O. Vouliagmeni, where he retired in 1988 at the age of 42. Following his retirement, he began running a sporting goods store in Athens.

== Death ==
Gonios died on 16 April 2026, at the age of 79. His funeral was held two days later at the Zografou Cemetery, and was attended by some of his former teammates, including Antonis Antoniadis and Vasilis Konstantinou.

== Honours ==
Panathinaikos

- Alpha Ethniki: 1968–69, 1969–70, 1971–72, 1976–77
- Greek Football Cup: 1968–69, 1976–77
- European Cup runner-up: 1970–71
- Balkans Cup: 1977

A.O. Vouliagmeni

- Athens Football Clubs Association Championship: 1984–85
- Athens Football Clubs Association Cup: 1987–88
