= Demetris Kizas =

Cypriot footballer (1953–2026)

Personal information
- Date of birth: 6 September 1953
- Place of birth: Paralimni, British Cyprus
- Date of death: 19 October 2026 (aged 73)
- Place of death: Patras, Greece
- Height: 1.80 m (5 ft 11 in)
- Position: Defender

Youth career
- Enosis Neon Paralimni

Senior career*
Years	Team	Apps	(Gls)
1971–1975	Enosis Neon Paralimni	135	
1975–1981	Panathinaikos	78	
1981–1982	Panachaiki	31	
1982–1983	OFI	4	
1983–1989	Panachaiki	197	

International career
1975–1980	Cyprus	9	(1)
- * Club domestic league appearances and goals

Demetris Kizas (Greek: Δημήτρης Κύζας; 6 September 1953 – 19 October 2026) was a Cypriot footballer who played as a defender, spending most of his career in Greece. For the Cyprus national team, he made nine appearances scoring once.

== Playing career ==
Kizas began to play football from Paralimni in 1971 and in 1976 he went to Greece to play for Panathinaikos. After a big career with Panathinaikos, in 1981 he went to Panachaiki and the next year to the OFI of Crete. A year later, he returned to Panachaiki where he retired in 1989. After retiring, he was a permanent resident of Patras. He was a member and was also chairman of veterans of Panachaiki.

He played nine times for the Cyprus national team and scored one goal.

== Death ==
Kizas died on 19 October 2026, at the age of 73.

== Honours ==
Panathinaikos

- Alpha Ethniki: 1976–77
- Greek Cup: 1976–77

Panachaiki

- Beta Ethniki: 1983–84, 1986–87
