= Minchev =

Minchev, Mintschev or Mintchev (Bulgarian: Минчев) is a Bulgarian masculine surname, its feminine counterpart is Mincheva, Mintscheva or Mintcheva Notable people with this surname include:

- Bozhidar Minchev (born 1946), Bulgarian ice hockey player
- Dobrinka Mincheva (born 1962), Bulgarian swimmer
- Donka Mincheva (born 1973), Bulgarian weightlifter
- Georgi Minchev (disambiguation), multiple people
- Ivan Minchev (born 1991), Bulgarian footballer
- Maria Mintscheva (born 1952), Bulgarian sprint canoer
- Mariana Mincheva (born 1959), Bulgarian rower
- Martin Minchev (born 2001), Bulgarian footballer
- Martin P. Mintchev (born 1962), Bulgarian engineer
- Sevdalin Minchev (born 1974), Bulgarian weightlifter
- Simeon Minchev (born 1982), Bulgarian footballer
- Tenyo Minchev (born 1954), Bulgarian footballer
- Velitscha Mintscheva, Bulgarian sprint canoer
