= Kostas Eleftherakis =

Greek footballer (born 1950)

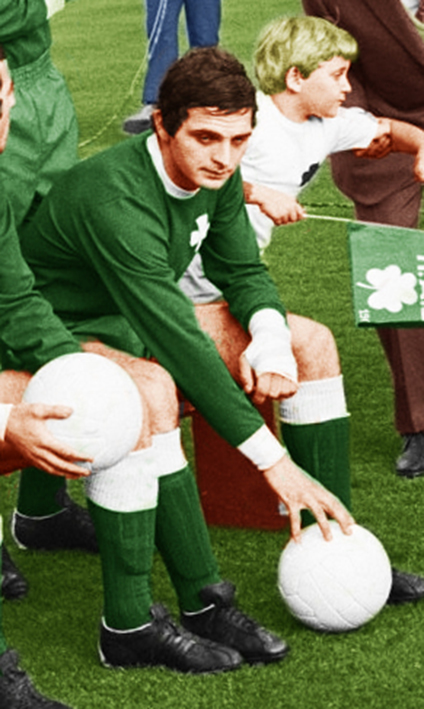

Personal information
- Full name: Kostantinos Eleftherakis
- Date of birth: 18 July 1950 (age 76)
- Place of birth: Tavros, Athens, Kingdom of Greece
- Height: 1.69 m (5 ft 7 in)
- Position: Midfielder

Youth career
- 1962–1968: Fostiras

Senior career*
| Years | Team | Apps | (Gls) |
| 1968–1980 | Panathinaikos | 308 | (85) |
| 1980–1981 | AEK Athens | 23 | (5) |
| 1981–1982 | Fostiras | 25 | (5) |
| Total | | 356 | (95) |

International career
| 1964 | Greece U19 | | |
| 1969–1977 | Greece | 34 | (5) |
- * Club domestic league appearances and goals

Kostas Eleftherakis (Greek: Κώστας Ελευθεράκης; born 18 July 1950) is a Greek former international football player who played as a midfielder. His nickname was "the Deer" (Greek: "το Ελάφι").

== Early life ==
Eleftherakis was born in Tavros. He came from a working-class family. His parents were named Giorgos and Pinelopi, and his father worked at the Athens Gas Company. He also had another brother, Nikolas, who was killed at a young age. He began his football career at his local club, Fostiras, for which he signed a contract at the age of 12. The fee for his signature was a bottle of milk and a piece of baklava.

== Club career ==
In 1964, Eleftherakis made his professional debut in the second division, where he scored a brace over Atromitos. He initially played as a right winger, but was later established as a midfielder. His performances attracted the interest of the major Greek clubs.

In 1968 he was transferred to Panathinaikos. At age 21 he was a key part of the squad that reached 1971 European Cup final in Wembley Stadium against Ajax. He scored a goal in both legs of the first round against Jeunesse Esch. After the final, Real Madrid and Everton expressed interest in acquiring him. Real Madrid offered an inconceivable for the time fee of 35 million drachmas for Eleftherakis. However, the Secretary General of Athletics, appointed by the regime of the time, Costas Aslanidis stood in the way. The same happened when Everton made an offer through Billy Bingham who coached Greece in the early 1970s. During his spell at Panathinaikos was called to play for the World XI. An injury he sustained in May 1977 in a match against Ethnikos Piraeus left him out of football for six months. He never regained his form completely after that. In 1980 he came in a dispute with the managerement of the club, which resulted in his departure.

On 12 July 1980 he signed for AEK Athens. He played there for a season, not managing to established himself in the roster.

On 17 August 1981 he returned to Fostiras, where retired as a footballer.

== International career ==
Shortly afterwards, he was called up to Greece U19 by the manager Lakis Petropoulos.

Eleftherakis made 34 appearances for the Greece national football team from 1969 to 1977.

== Honours ==
Panathinaikos

- Alpha Ethniki: 1968–69, 1969–70, 1971–72, 1976–77
- Greek Cup: 1968–69, 1976–77
- Greater Greece Cup: 1970
