= Andreas Christodoulou =

Andreas Christodoulou may refer to:

- Andreas Christodoulou (footballer, born 1934)
- Andreas Christodoulou (footballer, born 1997)
- Antreas Christodoulou, or Andreas, basketball player
