= Kazimierz Górski =

Polish footballer (1921–2006)

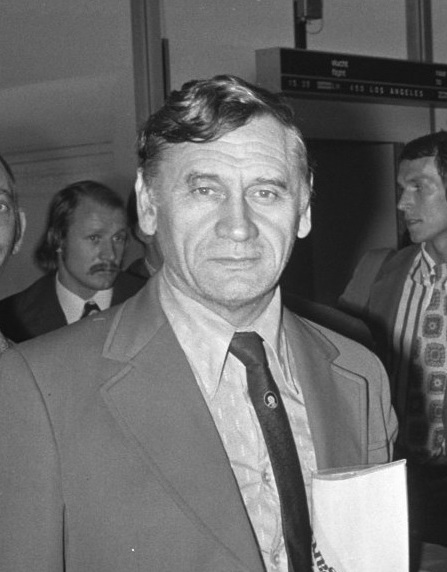
- Górski in 1973

Personal information
- Full name: Kazimierz Klaudiusz Górski
- Date of birth: 2 March 1921
- Place of birth: Lwów, Poland
- Date of death: 23 May 2006 (aged 85)
- Place of death: Warsaw, Poland
- Position: Striker

Senior career*
Years	Team	Apps	(Gls)
1936–1939	RKS Lwów		
1940–1941	Spartak Lviv		
1944	Dynamo Lviv		
1945–1953	Legia Warsaw		

International career
1948	Poland	1	(0)

Managerial career
- 1954: Marymont Warsaw
- 1955–1959: Poland U19
- 1959: Legia Warsaw (caretaker)
- 1960–1962: Legia Warsaw
- 1963–1964: KS Lublinianka
- 1964–1966: Gwardia Warsaw
- 1966–1970: Poland U23
- 1970–1976: Poland
- 1973: ŁKS Łódź
- 1976–1978: Panathinaikos
- 1978–1980: Kastoria
- 1980–1981: Olympiacos
- 1981–1982: Legia Warsaw
- 1983: Olympiacos
- 1983–1985: Ethnikos Piraeus
Medal record
Men's football
Representing Poland (as manager)
FIFA World Cup
Third place	1974 West Germany
Olympic Games
Gold medal – first place	1972 Munich	Team
Silver medal – second place	1976 Montreal	Team
- * Club domestic league appearances and goals

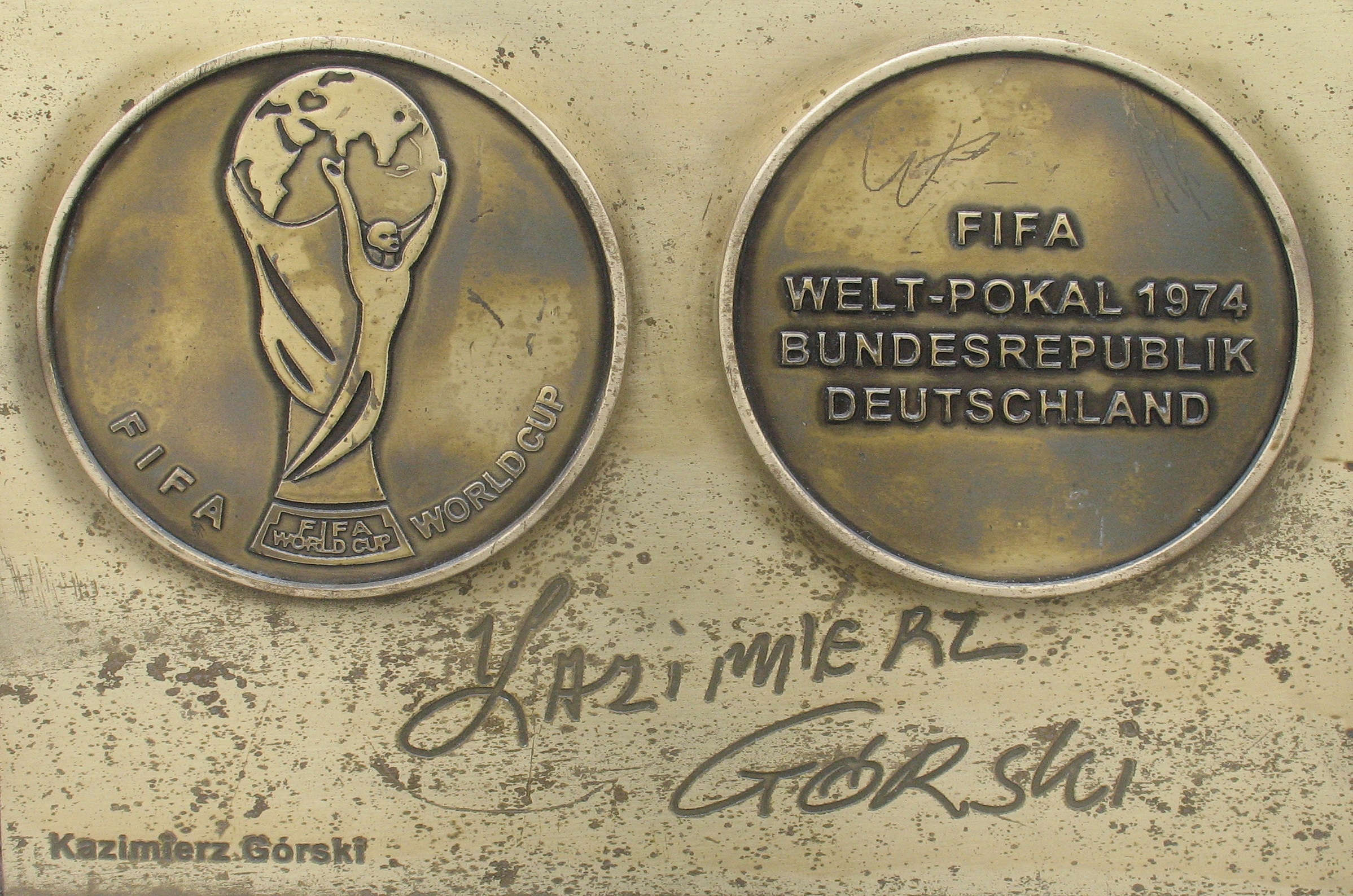
Copy of K. Górski medal and autograph in Sports Star Avenue in Dziwnów

Kazimierz Klaudiusz Górski (2 March 1921 – 23 May 2006) was a Polish professional football manager. He was also a football player, capped once for Poland.

Under his tenure, Poland finished third at the 1974 FIFA World Cup and won two Olympic medals; gold in 1972 and silver in 1976. He is often regarded as the best Polish football manager of all time.

== Playing career ==
Górski was born in Lwów, Second Polish Republic (nowadays Lviv, Ukraine). He played as a forward in several Polish football teams: RKS Lwów, Spartak Lviv, Dynamo Lviv, Legia Warsaw. His football nickname was "Sarenka" ("Fawn"). His successful career was interrupted by World War II and it took until 1948 before he participated in his only international match, a game between Poland and Denmark (8–0 loss).

== Coaching career ==
=== Club in Poland ===
Górski graduated in football training from the Higher School of Physical Education in Kraków (Wyższa Szkoła Wychowania Fizycznego, today the Akademia Wychowania Fizycznego w Krakowie) and the Physical Education Academy in Wrocław (Akademia Wychowania Fizycznego we Wrocławiu) in 1980. He was the coach of Legia Warsaw (three times), Marymont Warszawa (his first independent training job started there in 1954), Gwardia Warszawa, Lublinianka Lublin, and ŁKS Łódź.

=== Poland national team ===
Górski started as the coach of the Poland national junior team from 1956 to 1966, then the Polish U-23 national team from 1966 to 1970, and finally the first Poland national football team from 1970 to 1976. His first international match with the team was held on 5 May 1971 in Lausanne against Switzerland. His major successes were winning the gold medal in the 1972 Olympic Games in Munich; the silver medal (for third place) in the 1974 World Cup held in Germany; and another silver medal for second place in the 1976 Olympic Games in Montreal (the second of Poland's three Olympic medals in football). Kazimierz Górski was the coach of the Poland national team for 73 matches (with 45 wins).

Poland qualified for the 1974 World Cup by defeating 1966 World Cup winners England at home and holding them to a draw at Wembley.

=== Club in Greece ===
After resigning his position with the Polish national team, Górski went to Greece and was a successful coach with Panathinaikos, Kastoria FC, Olympiacos and Ethnikos Piraeus.

== PZPN activist ==
From 1976 Kazimierz Górski was an honorary member of the Polish Football Union (Polski Związek Piłki Nożnej, PZPN).

When he retired from coaching, he became an activist for PZPN in 1986. From 1987 he was a vice-president and from 1991 to 1995 was the president of PZPN. From 3 July 1995 he was the honorary president of PZPN.

He died from cancer following a long illness on 23 May 2006, aged 85, in Warsaw.

== Honours ==
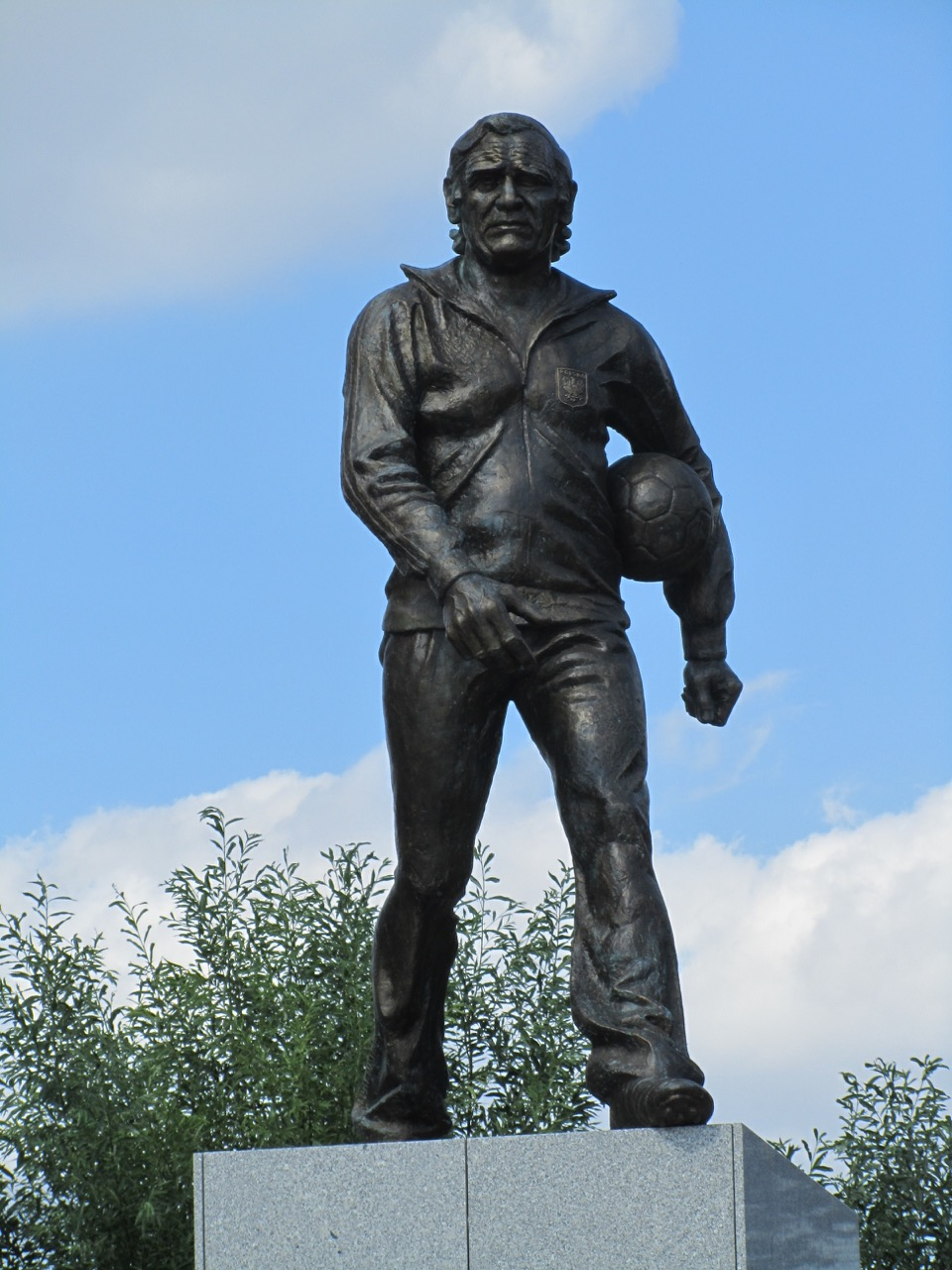
The bronze statue of Kazimierz Górski outside the National Stadium in Warsaw, unveiled in 2015

Poland

- Olympic gold medal: 1972
- Olympic silver medal: 1976
- FIFA World Cup third place: 1974

Panathinaikos

- Super League Greece: 1976–77
- Greek Cup: 1976–77

Olympiacos

- Super League Greece: 1979–80, 1980–81, 1982–83
- Greek Cup: 1980–81

Awards and recognition

- FIFA Order of Merit (2006, posthumously)
- Order of Merit in Ruby – UEFA award (2006, posthumously)
- Gold Medal of Merit – FIFA award (2001)
- Commander's Cross of Polonia Restituta (1996)
- Commander's with Star of Polonia Restituta (2006)
- Grand Cross of Polonia Restituta (2006, posthumous)
- Honorary citizen of Lviv (2003), Płock (2004) and Lubaczów
- Doctor Honoris Causa of the Gdańsk Academy of Physical Education and Sport (Akademia Wychowania Fizycznego i Sportu im. Jędrzeja Śniadeckiego) (24 November 2003)
- Super Victor (24 April 2006)

=== Other recognition ===
- A School Sports Championships in Łódź was named after him.
- The National Stadium is named after him and has a statue honouring him outside it.
- The Kazimierz Górski Stadium in Płock is also named after him.

Sporting positions
Preceded by Jerzy Domański	President of Polish Football Association; 25 March 1991 – 3 July 1995	Succeeded by Marian Dziurowicz
