= 1966–67 Alpha Ethniki =

31st season of top-tier football league in Greece

Alpha Ethniki
- Season: 1966–67
- Champions: Olympiacos; 17th Greek title
- Relegated: Trikala
- European Cup: Olympiacos
- Cup Winners' Cup: Panathinaikos
- Inter-Cities Fairs Cup: PAOK
- Matches: 240
- Goals: 586 (2.44 per match)
- Top goalscorer: Giorgos Sideris (24 goals)

The 1966–67 Alpha Ethniki was the 31st season of the highest football league of Greece. The season began on 23 October 1966 and ended on 18 June 1967. Olympiacos won their second consecutive and 17th Greek title.

The point system was: Win: 3 points - Draw: 2 points - Loss: 1 point.

== Teams ==
Promoted from 1965–66 Beta Ethniki	Relegated from 1965–66 Alpha Ethniki
Vyzas Megara; Veria	Panegialios; Niki Volos

Location of teams in 1966–67 Alpha Ethniki

== League table ==
Pos	Team	Pld	W	D	L	GF	GA	GD	Pts	Qualification or relegation
1	Olympiacos (C)	30	21	7	2	59	17	+42	79	Qualification for European Cup first round
2	AEK Athens	30	18	10	2	52	21	+31	76	
3	Panathinaikos	30	17	7	6	42	24	+18	71	Qualification for Cup Winners' Cup first round
4	PAOK	30	13	11	6	36	20	+16	67	Invitation for Inter-Cities Fairs Cup first round
5	Aris	30	14	5	11	38	30	+8	63	
6	Panionios	30	11	9	10	38	36	+2	61	
7	Ethnikos Piraeus	30	11	7	12	42	38	+4	59	
8	Proodeftiki	30	8	11	11	37	41	−4	57	
9	Iraklis	30	7	12	11	25	39	−14	56	
10	Vyzas Megara	30	11	4	15	31	50	−19	56	
11	Egaleo	30	9	7	14	36	47	−11	55	
12	Apollon Athens	30	8	8	14	33	35	−2	54	
13	Veria	30	7	9	14	23	37	−14	53	
14	Pierikos (Note: Pierikos were deducted 1 point.)	30	8	7	15	36	51	−15	52 (Note: 14th place play-off: Pierikos–Panserraikos 2–1.)	
15	Panserraikos	30	7	8	15	29	46	−17	52	
16	Trikala (R)	30	6	6	18	29	54	−25	48	Relegation to Beta Ethniki

Source: RSSSF
Rules for classification: 1st points; 2nd decision match; 3rd head-to-head goal difference.
(C) Champions; (R) Relegated

== Results ==
Home \ Away	AEK	APA	ARIS	EGA	ETH	IRA	OLY	PAO	PAN	PNS	PAOK	PIE	PRO	TRI	VER	VYZ
AEK Athens		1–1	3–0	2–1	0–0	3–1	1–0	0–0	3–0	5–1	2–0	3–0	4–3	2–1	2–1	2–0
Apollon Athens	0–1		1–1	0–1	1–0	5–0	0–2	0–1	0–1	1–1	2–0	1–1	2–1	1–2	3–0	2–1
Aris	2–0	1–0		2–0	3–1	1–0	2–2	0–1	2–2	2–0	1–0	3–0	2–1	3–1	2–0	4–1
Egaleo	0–2	2–6	0–1		2–1	4–2	0–0	2–4	1–1	3–1	1–2	2–1	0–0	1–0	3–1	2–1
Ethnikos Piraeus	1–2	3–0	3–0	3–1		0–2	3–3	0–2	0–1	1–0	0–0	5–3	1–1	4–3	1–0	2–0
Iraklis	0–0	0–0	2–0	1–1	1–1		0–1	1–2	3–2	2–0	0–0	3–2	1–0	1–0	1–1	0–1
Olympiacos	1–1	3–0	1–0	1–0	2–1	6–0		4–0	3–0	3–0	3–2	2–1	2–0	2–0	1–0	3–1
Panathinaikos	0–0	2–1	3–2	2–1	2–0	2–0	0–1		1–1	3–1	0–0	3–0	1–2	2–0	0–1	2–0
Panionios	0–1	1–1	2–0	1–2	1–0	1–1	0–0	0–2		4–1	1–0	2–0	2–1	3–0	2–1	3–1
Panserraikos	1–1	1–0	1–0	0–0	1–2	0–0	0–0	2–0	1–1		1–1	2–1	2–3	1–0	4–0	3–1
PAOK	1–0	2–1	0–0	3–1	2–0	0–0	2–0	0–0	2–1	2–0		0–0	1–0	6–0	3–1	5–2
Pierikos	4–4	1–1	0–0	1–0	0–0	2–0	0–2 (Note: Pierikos-Olympiacos 0-0, forfait 0-2.)	0–2	3–2	3–0	2–0		0–0	3–1	0–2	4–1
Proodeftiki	1–1	1–1	1–0	2–2	0–5	2–2	0–4	1–1	3–1	2–2	0–1	6–1		1–0	0–0	2–1
Trikala	1–2	0–2	2–1	2–2	2–2	1–0	1–2	2–3	1–1	2–1	1–1	2–1	0–0		2–1	0–2 (Note: awarded 2–0 for Vyzas due to illegal participation of a Trikala player and the latter were zeroed.)
Veria	0–0	2–0	1–3	1–0	1–2	0–0	1–1	1–1	1–1	2–1	0–0	1–2	1–0	1–0		1–1
Vyzas Megara	0–4	2–0	1–0	3–1	2–0	1–1	1–4	1–0	1–0	1–0	0–0	1–0	0–3	2–2	1–0	

Source: RSSSF
Legend: Blue = home team win; Yellow = draw; Red = away team win.

== Top scorers ==
Rank	Player	Club	Goals
1	(Greece) Giorgos Sideris	Olympiacos	24
2	(Greece) Vasilis Kyriakou	Apollon Athens	21
3	(Greece) Sakis Kouvas	Vyzas Megara	15
3	(Greece) Giannis Frantzis	Proodeftiki	15
5	(Greece) Georgios Dedes	Panionios	14
6	(Greece) Panagiotis Ventouris	AEK Athens	13
7	(Greece) Alekos Alexiadis	Aris	12
7	(Greece) Giannis Kalaitzidis	Panathinaikos	12

== Attendances ==
Olympiacos drew the highest average home attendance in the 1966–67 Alpha Ethniki.

#	Team	Average attendance
1	Olympiacos	27,591
2	Panathinaikos	18,496
3	AEK Athens	14,908
4	PAOK	10,850
5	Proodeftiki	8,034
6	Ethnikos Piraeus	6,965
7	Iraklis	6,958
8	Aris	6,322
9	Egaleo	5,669
10	Apollon Athens	4,870
11	Panionios	4,859
12	Panserraikos	4,826
13	Veria	4,642
14	Trikala	3,525
15	Vyzas Megara	2,940
16	Pierikos	2,420
