= Antonis Antoniadis =

Greek footballer (born 1946)

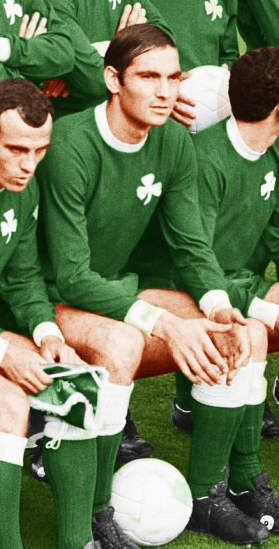
- Antoniadis at the 1971 European Cup Final

Personal information
- Full name: Antonios Antoniadis
- Date of birth: 25 May 1946 (age 80)
- Place of birth: Petrochori, Kingdom of Greece
- Height: 1.87 m (6 ft 2 in)
- Position: Striker

Youth career
- 1964–1966: Aspida Xanthi

Senior career*
Years	Team	Apps	(Gls)
1966–1968	Aspida Xanthi	56	(43)
1968–1978	Panathinaikos	222	(177)
1978–1979	Olympiacos	13	(7)
1979–1980	Atromitos	20	(7)
1980–1981	Panathinaikos	6	(3)
Total		317	(237)

International career
1970–1977	Greece	21	(6)
Medal record
Men's football
Representing Greece
World Military Cup
Winner	1969
- * Club domestic league appearances and goals

Antonis Antoniadis (Greek: Αντώνης Αντωνιάδης, born 25 May 1946) is a Greek former professional footballer who played as a striker. He scored 243 goals during his 22-year-long career. He started his career in 1964 playing for Aspida Xanthi before moving to Panathinaikos on 31 July 1968. Antoniadis scored his first official goal for Panathinaikos on 27 October 1968 in a 1–0 victory over Apollon Athens. During his time at Xanthi, he was sometimes used as a goalkeeper because of his height. His nickname was "the Tall" (Greek: "Ο Ψηλός).

== Career ==
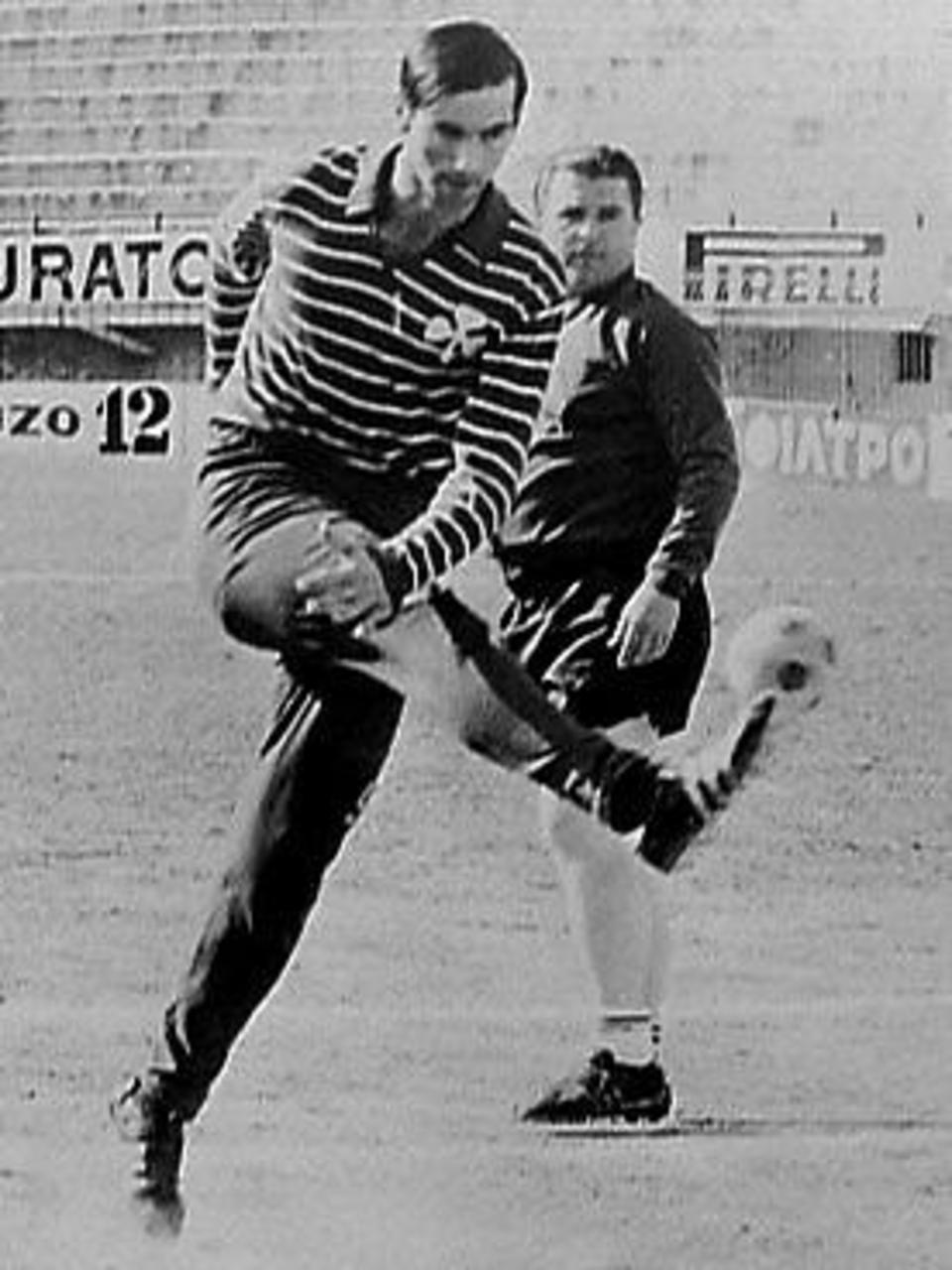
Antoniadis with Ferenc Puskás (1971)

Antoniadis scored 187 goals in 242 matches in the Greek Championship, and was top scorer five times: in 1970 (25 goals), 1972 (39 goals), 1973 (22), 1974 (26) and 1975 (20). In 1971, when Panathinaikos reached the European Cup Final against Ajax, Antoniadis was the leading scorer in the tournament with 10 goals.

During the summer of 1978 he was transferred to Olympiacos where he stayed for one season, playing in 13 games and scoring 7 goals. He later went on to play for Atromitos Athens. In 1980 he went full circle and returned to Panathinaikos. Antoniadis is known for his accurate heading and long, powerful shots. He made 21 appearances and scored 6 goals for the Greece national team between 1970 and 1977.

After his retirement, he served as president of Panhellenic Professional Football Players Association (1980 - 2008) and as vice-president of the football team of Panathinaikos Athletic Club from 2008 to 2010.

== Honours ==
Panathinaikos

- Alpha Ethniki: 1968–69, 1969–70, 1971–72, 1976–77
- Greek Cup: 1968–69, 1976–77
- European Cup: 1971 (runner-up)
- Intercontinental Cup: 1971 (runner-up)
- Balkans Cup: 1977

Greece military

- World Military Cup: 1969

Individual

- Beta Ethniki top scorer: 1967–68
- Alpha Ethniki top scorer: 1969–70, 1971–72, 1972–73, 1973–74, 1974–75 (record)
- European Cup top scorer: 1970–71
- European Silver Boot: 1971
