= Erol Togay =

Turkish football player and manager

Erol Togay (1 February 1950 – 9 August 2012) was a Turkish football player and manager. He played as a defender for Fenerbahçe, Vefa (1968–1972), Altay (1972–1978) and Adana Demirspor (1981–1984) and the Turkey national team.

== Career ==
Togay played for Turkey in five qualifying matches for the 1978 FIFA World Cup.

Togay was appointed as Fenerbahçe coach in 1991, succeeding Guus Hiddink. He managed Fenerbahçe in two games. He also managed Çanakkale Dardanelspor, Zeytinburnuspor, Küçükçekmecespor, Zonguldakspor, Düzcespor and Konyaspor.

== Personal life ==
He had multiple sclerosis since 1999.

Sporting positions
Preceded by (Netherlands) Guus Hiddink	Fenerbahçe football team Manager; 1990-1991	Succeeded by (Turkey) Tınaz Tırpan
