= Georgi Minchev =

Georgi Minchev is the name of:

- Georgi Minchev (musician) (1943–2001), Bulgarian rock singer and musician
- Georgi Minchev (composer) (born 1939), Bulgarian classical music composer
- Georgi Minchev (footballer) (born 1995), Bulgarian footballer
