= 1969–70 Alpha Ethniki =

34th season of top-tier football league in Greece

Alpha Ethniki
- Season: 1969–70
- Champions: Panathinaikos; 10th Greek title
- Relegated: Vyzas Megara; Olympiacos Volos; Olympiakos Nicosia; Panachaiki
- European Cup: Panathinaikos
- Cup Winners' Cup: Aris
- Inter-Cities Fairs Cup: AEK Athens; PAOK
- Matches: 306
- Goals: 697 (2.28 per match)
- Top goalscorer: Antonis Antoniadis (25 goals)

The 1969–70 Alpha Ethniki was the 34th season of the highest football league of Greece. The season began on 21 September 1969 and ended on 10 June 1970. Panathinaikos won their second consecutive and tenth Greek title.

The point system was: Win: 3 points - Draw: 2 points - Loss: 1 point.

== Teams ==
Promoted from 1968–69 Beta Ethniki	Relegated from 1968–69 Alpha Ethniki
Panachaiki; Kavala; Proodeftiki; Olympiacos Volos	Apollon Athens; Veria; Trikala; Chalkida; AEL Limassol
Promoted from 1968–69 Cypriot First Division	Apollon Athens; Veria; Trikala; Chalkida; AEL Limassol
Olympiakos Nicosia	Apollon Athens; Veria; Trikala; Chalkida; AEL Limassol

Location of teams in 1969–70 Alpha Ethniki

== League table ==
Pos	Team	Pld	W	D	L	GF	GA	GD	Pts	Qualification or relegation
1	Panathinaikos (C)	34	27	5	2	69	15	+54	93	Qualification for European Cup first round
2	AEK Athens	34	21	9	4	55	23	+32	85	Invitation for Inter-Cities Fairs Cup first round
3	Olympiacos	34	21	8	5	52	21	+31	84	
4	Aris	34	20	7	7	47	15	+32	81	Qualification for Cup Winners' Cup first round
5	PAOK	34	12	17	5	52	25	+27	75	Invitation for Inter-Cities Fairs Cup first round
6	Iraklis	34	14	12	8	37	31	+6	74	
7	Pierikos	34	13	11	10	45	44	+1	71	
8	Panserraikos	34	14	8	12	31	27	+4	70	
9	Panionios	34	11	10	13	42	34	+8	66	
10	Egaleo	34	10	12	12	36	35	+1	66	
11	Ethnikos Piraeus	34	8	15	11	40	37	+3	65	
12	Proodeftiki	34	9	13	12	36	34	+2	65	
13	OFI	34	11	7	16	33	40	−7	63	
14	Kavala	34	9	11	14	24	32	−8	63	
15	Vyzas Megara (R)	34	8	9	17	33	57	−24	59	Relegation to Beta Ethniki
16	Olympiacos Volos (R)	34	6	6	22	20	63	−43	52	Relegation to Beta Ethniki
17	Olympiakos Nicosia (R)	34	3	3	28	20	101	−81	43	Moving to Cypriot First Division
18	Panachaiki (Note: Panachaiki were deducted 13 points.) (R)	34	4	7	23	25	63	−38	36	Relegation to Beta Ethniki

Source: RSSSF
Rules for classification: 1st points; 2nd decision match; 3rd head-to-head goal difference.
(C) Champions; (R) Relegated

== Results ==
Home \ Away	AEK	ARIS	EGA	ETH	IRA	KAV	OFI	OLY	OLV	OLN	PNC	PAO	PAN	PNS	PAOK	PIE	PRO	VYZ
AEK Athens		1–0	1–1	0–0	2–0	1–0	3–2	1–0	2–1	5–1	2–0 (Note: Awarded.)	0–2	3–1	1–0	2–0	6–1	2–0	4–0
Aris	1–2		1–0	2–0	2–0	3–0	1–0	1–0	3–0	6–0	2–0 (Note: Aris-Panachaiki 0-0, forfeit 2-0 (Panachaiki tried to fix this game).)	2–0	2–0	2–1	0–0	3–0	3–0	2–1
Egaleo	0–0	0–0		2–1	2–0	0–0	0–0	0–1	0–0	4–1	2–0	1–3	2–0	2–0	2–2	2–1	1–1	3–0
Ethnikos Piraeus	1–1	1–1	2–2		0–0	2–0	4–0	0–4	6–0	4–0	1–1	0–1	2–2	1–1	1–1	0–0	1–1	2–0
Iraklis	2–1	0–0	4–2	2–0		3–1	2–0	1–1	1–0	2–0	2–1	0–0	2–1	2–1	1–1	0–0	1–0	2–0
Kavala	0–0	0–0	1–0	2–0	0–0		1–0	1–2	1–0	5–0	2–1	1–2	1–1	0–0	1–1	1–0	1–0	1–1
OFI	0–0	1–0	1–0	0–0	2–1	2–2		2–0	4–0	4–0	2–0	0–3	1–2	1–0	3–1	3–3	1–0	0–0
Olympiacos	2–1	1–1	3–1	1–0	1–0	3–0	2–1		3–0	3–1	4–2	0–1	4–1	0–0	1–1	1–0	2–0	1–0
Olympiacos Volos	0–1	0–3	1–1	1–3	1–1	0–0	1–0	1–0		1–0	2–0	0–2	2–1	1–2	0–0	0–2	0–3	2–1
Olympiakos Nicosia	0–1	0–2	0–3	2–2	0–2	1–0	0–1	0–2	3–1		2–0	1–3	1–1	0–2	1–2	2–5	0–1	1–4
Panachaiki	0–2	0–1	0–2	1–2	0–2	1–1	2–1	0–2	1–0	4–1		0–2	0–2	0–2	0–2	0–2	5–4	0–0
Panathinaikos	0–1	2–0	4–0	2–1	4–1	1–0	2–1	0–0	4–1	3–0	3–0		2–0	2–0	1–1	1–1	3–1	7–0
Panionios	2–2	0–1	0–0	2–0	0–0	1–0	4–0	0–2	2–0	8–0	4–0	0–2		1–0	0–0	2–0	0–0	4–0
Panserraikos	1–1	0–1	1–0	0–1	1–1	1–0	1–0	0–1	1–1	1–0	2–1	0–0	2–0		1–0	3–0	1–0	3–1
PAOK	4–0	0–0	3–0	1–1	1–1	2–0	1–0	1–2	3–0	5–0	1–1	0–1	0–0	3–0		3–1	3–0	6–1
Pierikos	0–0	2–0	1–0	1–0	1–1	2–0	1–0	3–3	3–2	3–0	2–2	2–3	2–0	2–1	0–0		2–2	1–0
Proodeftiki	0–2	1–0	0–0	2–0	3–0	1–0	0–0	0–0	1–0	9–0	1–1	0–2	0–0	1–1	1–1	1–1		2–0
Vyzas Megara	1–4	2–1	2–1	1–1	2–0	0–1	3–0	0–0	5–1	2–2	1–1	0–1	1–0	0–1	2–2	2–0	0–0	

Source: RSSSF
Legend: Blue = home team win; Yellow = draw; Red = away team win.

== Top scorers ==
Rank	Player	Club	Goals
1	(Greece) Antonis Antoniadis	Panathinaikos	25
2	(Greece) Mimis Papaioannou	AEK Athens	18
3	(Greece) Georgios Dedes	Panionios	17
3	(Greece) Stavros Sarafis	PAOK	17
3	(Greece) Nikos Gioutsos	Olympiacos	17
6	(Greece) Alekos Alexiadis	Aris	15
6	(Greece) Michalis Kritikopoulos	Ethnikos Piraeus	15
8	(Greece) Sakis Kouvas	Vyzas	14
8	(Greece) Stamatis Vourdamis	Proodeftiki	14
10	(Greece) Panagiotis Ventouris	AEK Athens	12
10	(Greece) Kostas Nikolaidis	AEK Athens	12

== Attendances ==
Olympiacos drew the highest average home attendance in the 1969–70 Alpha Ethniki.

#	Team	Average attendance
1	Olympiacos	24,228
2	Panathinaikos	19,533
3	PAOK	16,616
4	AEK Athens	14,192
5	Iraklis	11,945
6	Ethnikos Piraeus	10,555
7	Aris	10,454
8	Kavala	8,879
9	Proodeftiki	8,187
10	Panionios	6,272
11	Panachaiki	6,101
12	Egaleo	5,336
13	OFI	5,149
14	Panserraikos	4,827
15	Olympiacos Volos	4,532
16	Pierikos	3,107
17	Vyzas Megara	3,062
18	Olympiakos Nicosia	2,124
