= 1967–68 Beta Ethniki =

Beta Ethniki
- Season: 1967–68
- Dates: 8 October 1967 – 5 May 1968
- Champions: Chalkida (South); Trikala (North)
- Promoted: Chalkida; OFI; Trikala
- Relegated: None

Beta Ethniki 1967–68 complete season.

== South Group ==
=== League table ===
Pos	Team	Pld	W	D	L	GF	GA	GD	Pts	Promotion or qualification
1	Chalkida (Note: Took the place of Olympiakos Chalkida.) (C, P)	30	18	5	7	42	14	+28	71	Promotion to Alpha Ethniki
2	OFI (P)	30	13	10	7	44	31	+13	66	Qualification for Promotion play-off
3	Kalamata	30	11	13	6	33	25	+8	65	
4	Atromitos	30	14	5	11	45	39	+6	63	
5	Panetolikos	30	12	8	10	39	30	+9	62	
6	Panachaiki	30	12	7	11	54	45	+9	61	
7	Levadiakos	30	12	7	11	35	41	−6	61	
8	Diagoras	30	10	11	9	31	35	−4	61	
9	Atromitos Piraeus	30	11	8	11	43	33	+10	60	
10	PAS Giannina	30	10	9	11	38	42	−4	59	
11	Ionikos	30	9	10	11	34	34	0	58	
12	Fostiras	30	9	10	11	37	39	−2	58	
13	Ethnikos Asteras	30	9	9	12	32	39	−7	57	
14	Korinthos	30	11	5	14	35	46	−11	57	
15	Aias Salamina	30	7	9	14	28	41	−13	53	
16	Chania	30	6	6	18	33	69	−36	48	

(C) Champions; (P) Promoted

== North Group ==
=== League table ===
Pos	Team	Pld	W	D	L	GF	GA	GD	Pts	Promotion or qualification
1	Trikala (C, P)	30	20	5	5	61	25	+36	75	Promotion to Alpha Ethniki
2	Kavala	30	16	6	8	51	30	+21	68	Qualification for Promotion play-off
3	Lamia	30	13	9	8	48	40	+8	65	
4	Makedonikos	30	11	11	8	32	26	+6	63	
5	Edessaikos	30	11	11	8	40	35	+5	63	
6	Kastoria	30	12	9	9	27	27	0	63	
7	Niki Volos	30	11	10	9	40	33	+7	62	
8	Doxa Drama	30	10	11	9	31	30	+1	61	
9	Anagennisi Giannitsa	30	11	7	12	37	41	−4	59	
10	Aris Ptolemaida	30	7	14	9	30	33	−3	58	
11	Ethnikos Alexandroupoli	30	11	6	13	31	47	−16	58	
12	Apollon Kalamarias	30	6	14	10	30	31	−1	56	
13	Olympiakos Kozani	30	9	8	13	30	32	−2	56	
14	AEL	30	9	8	13	33	42	−9	55 (Note: AEL had 1 point deducted.)	
15	Xanthi	30	10	4	16	46	59	−13	54	
16	Nikiforos Florina	30	5	3	22	26	62	−36	42 (Note: ?1 point deducted?)	

(C) Champions; (P) Promoted

== Promotion play-off ==
Team 1	Agg.	Team 2	1st leg	2nd leg
Panelefsiniakos	2–4	OFI	2–1	0–3
Kavala	0–2	Panserraikos	0–0	0–2
