= Óscar Álvarez (footballer, born 1948) =

Argentine footballer

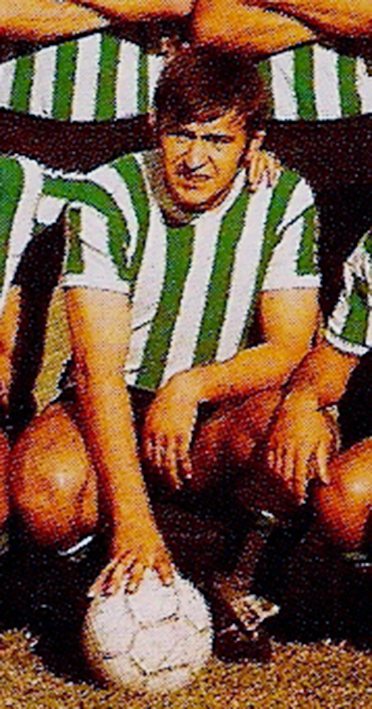

Personal information
- Full name: Oscar Marcelino Alvarez
- Date of birth: 25 May 1948
- Place of birth: Argentina
- Date of death: 28 April 2016 (aged 67)
- Height: 1.70 m (5 ft 7 in)
- Position: Striker

Senior career*
Years	Team	Apps	(Gls)
1968–1969	Banfield	16	(2)
1969–1970	Newell's Old Boys	6	(1)
1972–1976	PAS Giannina	120	(77)
1976–1980	Panathinaikos	115	(55)
1980–1981	Atromitos	18	(3)
- * Club domestic league appearances and goals as of May 2007

Óscar Marcelino Álvarez (25 May 1948 – 28 April 2016) was an Argentine professional football player.

== Club ==
He played in Argentina for Banfield and Newell's Old Boys between 1968 and 1970 before reappearing in Greece.

=== PAS Giannina ===
In 1972, he played four years for Greek club PAS Giannina, scoring 77 goals and becoming the second highest scorer in the club's history.

=== Panathinaikos ===
In 1976, he was transferred to Greek giants Panathinaikos where he played until 1980, scoring 57 goals and becoming the ninth highest scorer in the club's history. He was part of the team that earned the 1976–77 double. In 1977 Alvarez was the third scorer of the Greek championship with 19 goals and in 1978 he placed in the second place of scorers with 18 goals.

=== Atromitos ===
In 1980, he was transferred to Atromitos where he played until his retirement in 1981.

== Honours ==
Panathinaikos

- Alpha Ethniki: 1976–77
- Greek Cup: 1976–77
- Balkans Cup: 1977
