= Andreas Christodoulou (footballer, born 1934) =

Cypriot footballer

Andreas Christodoulou (born 1934) was a Cypriot football midfielder of the 1950s - 1960s era. His nickname was Pakos.

Pakos played for Omonia Nicosia from 1956 until 1963. He left for Greece and played until 1966 for Panathinaikos. On his return that year to Cyprus, Pakos joined Omonia's rivals APOEL.
