= 1971–72 Alpha Ethniki =

36th season of top-tier football league in Greece

Alpha Ethniki
- Season: 1971–72
- Champions: Panathinaikos; 11th Greek title
- Relegated: Veria; Pierikos; Apollon Athens; Olympiakos Nicosia
- European Cup: Panathinaikos
- UEFA Cup: Olympiacos; AEK Athens
- Cup Winners' Cup: PAOK
- Matches: 306
- Goals: 720 (2.35 per match)
- Top goalscorer: Antonis Antoniadis (39 goals)

The 1971–72 Alpha Ethniki was the 36th season of the highest football league of Greece. The season began on 19 September 1971 and ended on 25 June 1972. Panathinaikos won their 11th Greek title.

The point system was: Win: 3 points - Draw: 2 points - Loss: 1 point.

== Teams ==
Promoted from 1970–71 Beta Ethniki	Relegated from 1970–71 Alpha Ethniki
Panachaiki; Trikala; Olympiacos Volos	Panserraikos; Proodeftiki; OFI; EPA Larnaca
Promoted from 1970–71 Cypriot First Division	Panserraikos; Proodeftiki; OFI; EPA Larnaca
Olympiakos Nicosia	Panserraikos; Proodeftiki; OFI; EPA Larnaca

Location of teams in 1971–72 Alpha Ethniki

== League table ==
Pos	Team	Pld	W	D	L	GF	GA	GD	Pts	Qualification or relegation
1	Panathinaikos (C)	34	24	6	4	89	23	+66	88	Qualification for European Cup first round
2	Olympiacos	34	20	9	5	61	33	+28	83	Qualification for UEFA Cup first round
3	AEK Athens	34	20	8	6	57	23	+34	82	Qualification for UEFA Cup first round
4	Aris	34	18	11	5	52	25	+27	81	
5	PAOK	34	18	10	6	53	27	+26	80	Qualification for Cup Winners' Cup first round
6	Panachaiki	34	11	14	9	40	35	+5	70	
7	Panionios	34	13	9	12	32	33	−1	69	
8	Ethnikos Piraeus	34	9	15	10	39	36	+3	67	
9	Iraklis	34	11	11	12	36	40	−4	67	
10	Kavala	34	12	8	14	34	38	−4	66	
11	Egaleo	34	11	9	14	31	46	−15	65	
12	Trikala	34	9	12	13	38	43	−5	64	
13	Olympiacos Volos	34	10	8	16	26	43	−17	62	
14	Fostiras	34	8	12	14	37	53	−16	62	
15	Veria (R)	34	7	11	16	23	56	−33	59	Relegation to Beta Ethniki
16	Pierikos (R)	34	5	14	15	26	48	−22	58	Relegation to Beta Ethniki
17	Apollon Athens (R)	34	7	8	19	32	55	−23	56	Relegation to Beta Ethniki
18	Olympiakos Nicosia (Note: Olympiakos Nicosia were deducted 1 point.) (R)	34	2	7	25	14	63	−49	44	Moving to Cypriot First Division

Source: RSSSF
Rules for classification: 1st points; 2nd decision match; 3rd head-to-head goal difference.
(C) Champions; (R) Relegated

== Results ==
Home \ Away	AEK	APA	ARIS	EGA	ETH	FOS	IRA	KAV	OLY	OLN	OLV	PNC	PAO	PAN	PAOK	PIE	TRI	VER
AEK Athens		2–0	2–0	2–1	1–0	3–0	4–0	1–0	1–1	5–0	2–1	3–0	2–1	1–0	1–0	5–0	1–2	3–1
Apollon Athens	0–2		1–2	0–0	2–1	0–0	1–1	3–2	0–2	0–2	4–1	0–3	0–5	0–0	0–1	5–2	0–0	1–1
Aris	3–2	1–0		3–1	2–2	4–0	1–1	2–1	1–1	1–0	1–0	2–0	1–0	0–0	3–3	1–0	1–0	3–0
Egaleo	0–0	0–0	1–5		1–1	5–2	0–1	1–0	1–6	0–0	1–0	0–0	0–3	1–1	2–1	2–1	0–1	1–0
Ethnikos Piraeus	2–2	2–1	2–0	0–1		4–3	3–1	2–0	0–0	0–0	0–0	0–0	3–3	1–1	1–1	2–0	3–0	1–1
Fostiras	0–2	2–0	0–0	0–0	1–0		2–2	0–1	3–1	1–0	1–2	0–0	2–2	1–0	1–0	0–0	2–0	5–0
Iraklis	1–2	1–0	1–3	1–0	1–3	2–0		3–0	1–2	2–0	2–0	1–1	0–0	1–1	1–1	2–0	1–0	2–0
Kavala	1–0	2–1	0–0	1–0	2–1	4–0	3–0		0–0	4–0	0–0	0–0	1–1	0–1	0–0	2–1	1–1	3–1
Olympiacos	1–1	4–1	0–0	3–1	3–1	1–0	3–1	3–1		3–0	2–1	3–2	0–0	2–1	1–1	2–0	2–1	2–1
Olympiakos Nicosia	1–3	0–3	1–2	0–1	2–0	1–1	1–2	0–1	0–2 (Note: Olympiakos Nicosia-Olympiacos 0-1 suspended at 85' at 0-1, 0-2 awarded.)		1–2	0–0	0–3	1–2	0–1	0–0	1–2	0–1
Olympiacos Volos	0–0	1–2	0–0	2–1	1–1	2–1	1–0	1–0	0–1	0–0		1–1	1–5	1–0	0–1	1–0	4–1	1–0
Panachaiki	1–1	2–4	1–0	2–0	1–1	1–1	2–1	1–0	2–0	1–1	2–0		1–2	2–1	1–1	6–1	1–3	0–0
Panathinaikos	1–2	3–1	2–1	4–1	2–0	7–2	2–0	6–0	3–2	2–0	5–0	2–0		4–0	1–0	2–0	5–0	6–0
Panionios	2–1	2–1	1–0	3–1	1–0	1–1	2–2	1–0	0–1	3–0	2–1	1–0	0–2		0–1	0–0	0–0	3–1
PAOK	2–0	3–0	0–0	1–2	1–0	4–2	1–1	2–0	4–3	5–1	1–0	3–2	1–0	1–0		3–0	2–2	5–0
Pierikos	0–0	0–0	1–3	0–0	0–0	2–1	0–0	1–2	1–1	3–0	3–0	1–1	1–3	3–0	0–0		0–0	1–0
Trikala	0–0	2–0	1–1	2–3	0–1	1–1	1–0	3–1	1–2	6–1	1–1	0–1	1–2	2–0	1–2	2–2		1–1
Veria	1–0	3–1	0–5	0–2	1–1	1–1	0–0	1–1	2–1	1–0	1–0	1–2	0–0	0–2	1–0	2–2	0–0	

Source: RSSSF
Legend: Blue = home team win; Yellow = draw; Red = away team win.

== Top scorers ==
Rank	Player	Club	Goals
1	(Greece) Antonis Antoniadis	Panathinaikos	39
2	(France) Yves Triantafyllos	Olympiacos	19
3	(Greece) Alekos Alexiadis	Aris	15
4	(Greece) Kostas Davourlis	Panachaiki	14
4	(Greece) Kostas Eleftherakis	Panathinaikos	14
4	(Greece) Vasilis Kyriakou	Apollon Athens	14
7	(Greece) Agis Panopoulos	Fostiras	13
8	(Greece) Koulis Apostolidis	PAOK	12
8	(Greece) Mimis Papaioannou	AEK Athens	12
10	(Greece) Thanasis Intzoglou	Panionios	11

== Attendances ==
Olympiacos drew the highest average home attendance in the 1971–72 Alpha Ethniki.

#	Team	Average attendance
1	Olympiacos	32,471
2	Panathinaikos	24,215
3	PAOK	19,796
4	AEK Athens	18,028
5	Ethnikos Piraeus	10,646
6	Iraklis	10,616
7	Aris	10,118
8	Panachaiki	8,876
9	Panionios	7,793
10	Kavala	7,662
11	Egaleo	6,821
12	Trikala	6,710
13	Apollon Athens	6,104
14	Olympiacos Volos	6,033
15	Fostiras	4,341
16	Pierikos	3,665
17	Veria	3,565
18	Olympiakos Nicosia	2,579
