= Ante Miročević =

Montenegrin footballer

Personal information
- Full name: Ante Miročević
- Date of birth: 6 August 1952 (age 74)
- Place of birth: Titograd, PR Montenegro, FPR Yugoslavia
- Position: Midfielder

Senior career*
Years	Team	Apps	(Gls)
1975–1980	Budućnost Titograd	141	(26)
1980–1983	Sheffield Wednesday	70	(7)
1983–1984	Budućnost Titograd	12	(2)

International career
1978–1980	Yugoslavia	6	(2)
- * Club domestic league appearances and goals

Ante Miročević (born 6 August 1952) is a former Montenegrin footballer who played as a midfielder. He earned six caps for Yugoslavia. He was the first player playing in a club from Montenegro to earn a cap for the Yugoslavia national team.

== Club career ==
He became the first foreign player to sign for Sheffield Wednesday in 1980; however, his spell at the club was not a success despite being the club's record signing at the time. He did score Wednesday's only goal in the 2–1 defeat to Brighton & Hove Albion in the 1983 FA Cup Semi-Final at Highbury.

== International career ==
Miročević made his debut for Yugoslavia in a November 1978 Balkan Cup match against Greece and has earned a total of 6 caps, scoring 2 goals. His final international was an April 1980 friendly match against Poland.
