= Spyros Livathinos =

Greek footballer, coach, and scout

Personal information
- Full name: Spyridon Livathinos
- Date of birth: 8 January 1955 (age 71)
- Place of birth: Patras, Greece
- Position: Midfielder

Youth career
- –1975: Panathinaikos

Senior career*
Years	Team	Apps	(Gls)
1975–1986	Panathinaikos	268	
1986–1988	Pezoporikos Larnaca		

International career
1977–1982	Greece	27	(1)

Managerial career
- 1986–1988: Pezoporikos Larnaca
- 1989–1990: Korinthos
- 1990–1991: Ethnikos Piraeus
- AEK Larnaca
- 1996–1997: Kastoria
- 1997–1998: Athens Kallithea
- 1998–2001: Ethnikos Asteras
- 2001–2002: Panachaiki
- 2002: Ethnikos Asteras
- 2015–2019: Greece U19 (assistant)
- * Club domestic league appearances and goals

Spyros Livathinos (Greek: Σπύρος Λιβαθηνός; born 8 January 1955) is a former football player who played as a midfielder, coach and current scout of Panathinaikos.

== Career ==
Born in Patras, Livathinos started his football career in the Panathinaikos youth system. In 1975, he made it to the greens' first team where he played a total of 267 league games in 10 seasons, winning three Alpha Ethniki (1977, 1984, 1986) and four Greek Football Cup titles (1977, 1982, 1984, 1986). Livathinos then moved on to Cyprus where he became player/coach of Pezoporikos. In 1988, he led the Larnaca club to the championship of Cyprus and retired as a player.

Livathinos made 27 appearances and scored one goal for Greece.

He continued his managerial career guiding Ethnikos Asteras to the championship of the Greek B Division. He continued to coach the Kaisariani club in the Alpha Ethniki from 1999 until 2001. In 2002, he coached Panachaiki for the early part of the season and Ethnikos Asteras in the latter part, replacing Nikos Alefantos. Livathinos currently is scout of Panathinaikos.

== Honours ==
Panathinaikos

- Alpha Ethniki: 1977, 1984, 1986
- Greek Cup: 1977, 1982, 1984, 1986
