= 1968–69 Alpha Ethniki =

33rd season of top-tier football league in Greece

Alpha Ethniki
- Season: 1968–69
- Champions: Panathinaikos; 9th Greek title
- Relegated: Apollon Athens; Veria; Trikala; Chalkida; AEL Limassol
- European Cup: Panathinaikos
- Cup Winners' Cup: Olympiacos
- Inter-Cities Fairs Cup: Aris; Panionios
- Matches: 306
- Goals: 808 (2.64 per match)
- Top goalscorer: Giorgos Sideris (35 goals)

The 1968–69 Alpha Ethniki was the 33rd season of the highest football league of Greece. The season began on 22 September 1968 and ended on 15 June 1969. Panathinaikos won their ninth Greek title and their first one in three years.

The point system was: Win: 3 points - Draw: 2 points - Loss: 1 point.

== Teams ==
Promoted from 1967–68 Beta Ethniki	Relegated from 1967–68 Alpha Ethniki
Chalkida; Trikala; OFI	Panelefsiniakos; Proodeftiki; Olympiakos Nicosia; Olympiacos Volos
Promoted from 1967–68 Cypriot First Division	Panelefsiniakos; Proodeftiki; Olympiakos Nicosia; Olympiacos Volos
AEL Limassol	Panelefsiniakos; Proodeftiki; Olympiakos Nicosia; Olympiacos Volos

Location of teams in 1968–69 Alpha Ethniki

== League table ==
Pos	Team	Pld	W	D	L	GF	GA	GD	Pts	Qualification or relegation
1	Panathinaikos (C)	34	26	4	4	64	16	+48	90	Qualification for European Cup first round
2	Olympiacos	34	24	6	4	77	21	+56	88	Qualification for Cup Winners' Cup first round (Note: Since Panathinaikos, winners of 1968–69 Greek Football Cup, was qualified for the 1969–70 European Cup, losing cup finalists Olympiacos earned a spot in the first round of the 1969–70 European Cup Winners' Cup.)
3	Aris	34	17	11	6	54	33	+21	79	Invitation for Inter-Cities Fairs Cup first round
4	Panionios	34	18	7	9	55	34	+21	77	Invitation for Inter-Cities Fairs Cup first round
5	PAOK	34	16	10	8	58	37	+21	76	
6	AEK Athens (Note: AEK Athens were deducted 1 point.)	34	17	7	10	58	33	+25	74	
7	Egaleo	34	13	10	11	48	41	+7	70	
8	Ethnikos Piraeus	34	12	10	12	43	45	−2	68	
9	Pierikos	34	11	10	13	31	37	−6	66	
10	Panserraikos	34	12	7	15	43	46	−3	65	
11	Iraklis	34	12	7	15	36	39	−3	65	
12	OFI	34	12	6	16	37	45	−8	64	
13	Vyzas Megara	34	12	6	16	42	53	−11	64	
14	Apollon Athens (R)	34	12	5	17	40	38	+2	63	Qualification for relegation play-off
15	Veria (R)	34	8	12	14	34	41	−7	62	Qualification for relegation play-off
16	Trikala (R)	34	9	5	20	30	63	−33	57	Relegation to Beta Ethniki
17	Chalkida (R)	34	7	8	19	38	61	−23	56	Relegation to Beta Ethniki
18	AEL Limassol (R)	34	2	1	31	20	125	−105	39	Moving to Cypriot First Division

Source: RSSSF
Rules for classification: 1st points; 2nd decision match; 3rd head-to-head goal difference.
(C) Champions; (R) Relegated

== Results ==
Home \ Away	AEK	AEL	APA	ARIS	CHA	EGA	ETH	IRA	OFI	OLY	PAO	PAN	PNS	PAOK	PIE	TRI	VER	VYZ
AEK Athens		4–0	1–0	3–0	5–2	1–0	2–0	3–0	3–0	0–1	1–2	2–1	2–1	0–1	3–0	5–1	2–1	1–2
AEL Limassol	0–5		0–3	1–5	1–0	2–2	1–2	1–3	2–0	0–2	0–2	0–4	0–2	0–2	2–3	1–3	1–3	1–3
Apollon Athens	1–0	4–0		0–1	3–0	1–1	1–2	2–3	7–1	0–2	0–1	2–1	1–0	1–1	1–1	5–0	1–0	1–0
Aris	2–0	7–0	0–0		3–3	1–0	2–1	0–1	2–1	1–0	2–1	1–1	1–0	2–0	1–0	3–2	4–2	5–2
Chalkida	1–1	4–1	2–3	0–0		0–0	1–1	2–1	2–1	2–4	0–1	1–2	4–0	1–1	2–0	2–1	0–0	2–0
Egaleo	2–3	7–0	1–1	3–0	3–0		1–0	1–1	1–0	0–2	0–2	1–0	2–2	2–2	0–0	2–1	2–1	2–1
Ethnikos Piraeus	1–1	5–0	1–0	2–2	1–0	5–3		2–1	1–0	2–4	0–6	2–2	0–4	0–2	0–0	4–0	3–0	1–1
Iraklis	2–2	4–0	1–0	0–0	3–0	1–0	1–2		1–0	0–1	0–2	0–0	2–1	3–1	1–0	1–0	1–1	2–2
OFI	2–0 (Note: OFI–AEK Athens 0–2, forfeit 2–0.)	5–1	1–0	1–2	1–0	3–1	0–0	2–1		0–0	0–1	1–2	1–0	1–1	1–0	4–1	1–3	4–1
Olympiacos	2–3	6–0	3–0	2–2	6–2	2–1	1–0	3–0	3–0		2–1	3–1	2–1	3–0	3–0	3–0	3–0	6–1
Panathinaikos	1–2	7–0	1–0	1–0	1–0	1–1	1–0	1–0	1–0	0–0		1–0	7–0	2–0	2–1	3–0	1–0	2–1
Panionios	2–0	7–1	1–0	2–2	2–1	1–0	1–1	3–1	2–0	1–0	1–3		2–1	1–0	3–0	2–0	4–1	2–0
Panserraikos	1–0	6–1	3–0	2–0	3–1	3–1	1–0	1–0	0–2	1–1	0–1	0–0		2–4	0–0	1–1	2–1	3–0
PAOK	1–1	5–0	2–0	0–0	5–1	1–1	3–0	1–0	4–1	2–1	1–2	1–1	2–1		5–1	3–1	2–1	1–0
Pierikos	1–1	3–1	5–1	0–0	1–0	0–1	2–0	2–0	0–0	0–3	1–0	1–0	0–0	3–1		2–0	0–0	2–3
Trikala	1–0	3–1	1–0	0–0	1–0	1–2	0–3	1–0	1–1	0–0	1–4	2–3	3–0	1–1	0–1		1–0	1–0
Veria	1–1	2–0	0–1	2–1	2–2	0–1	0–0	1–1	0–1	0–0	1–1	3–0	1–1	1–1	0–0	3–1		2–1
Vyzas Megara	0–0	2–1	1–0	0–2	3–0	2–3	1–1	1–0	1–1	0–3	1–1	2–0	3–0	2–1	2–1	3–0	0–1	

Source: RSSSF
Legend: Blue = home team win; Yellow = draw; Red = away team win.
Notes:

Relegation play-offs
Team 1	Agg.	Team 2	1st leg	2nd leg	Play-off
Proodeftiki^{*}	1–1	Apollon Athens	1–0	0–1	0–0
Olympiakos Volos	6–5	Veria	2–1	2–3	2–1

^{*}Proodeftiki won on flip of a coin.

== Top scorers ==
Rank	Player	Club	Goals
1	(Greece) Giorgos Sideris	Olympiacos	35
2	(Greece) Georgios Dedes	Panionios	25
3	(Greece) Giorgos Koudas	PAOK	20
3	(Greece) Mimis Papaioannou	AEK Athens	20
5	(Greece) Giorgos Gonios	Panathinaikos	18
6	(Greece) Thanasis Intzoglou	Panionios	17
6	(Greece) Sakis Kouvas	Vyzas Megara	17
8	(Greece) Vasilis Kyriakou	Apollon Athens	14
8	(Greece) Alekos Alexiadis	Aris	14
10	(Greece) Michalis Kritikopoulos	Ethnikos Piraeus	13

== Attendances ==
Olympiacos drew the highest average home attendance in the 1968–69 Alpha Ethniki.

#	Team	Average attendance
1	Olympiacos	23,329
2	Panathinaikos	19,943
3	AEK Athens	17,567
4	PAOK	14,805
5	Aris	9,876
6	Ethnikos Piraeus	9,306
7	Iraklis	8,808
8	Egaleo	6,091
9	Panionios	6,049
10	OFI	5,866
11	Apollon Athens	5,635
12	Chalkida	4,501
13	Panserraikos	4,363
14	Trikala	4,202
15	Veria	4,001
16	Vyzas Megara	3,105
17	Pierikos	2,541
18	AEL Limassol	1,942
