= Alekos Alexiadis =

Greek footballer (1945–2025)

Personal information
- Full name: Alexandros Alexiadis
- Date of birth: 3 September 1945
- Place of birth: Thessaloniki, Greece
- Date of death: 11 March 2025 (aged 79)
- Place of death: Thessaloniki, Greece
- Position: Forward

Youth career
- 1957–1963: Aris

Senior career*
Years	Team	Apps	(Gls)
1963–1975	Aris	301	(127)
1975–1976	Panetolikos	20	(3)
1976–1977	Kastoria	8	(2)

International career
1966–1967	Greece	2	(2)
- * Club domestic league appearances and goals

Alekos Alexiadis (Greek: Αλέκος Αλεξιάδης; 3 September 1945 – 11 March 2025) was a Greek footballer who was a forward for Aris during the period 1963–1975. He was second, behind Dinos Kouis, on the all-time scorers list for Aris, having found the mark 127 times in his 301 appearances for the club. In 1976, Alexiadis played for Panetolikos and the following year for Kastoria. Overall, Alexiadis had 134 goals in 329 appearances in the Alpha Ethniki. He was capped twice with Greece, scoring 2 goals.

Alexiadis died in Thessaloniki on 11 March 2025, at the age of 79.
