= 1976–77 Alpha Ethniki =

41st season of top-tier football league in Greece

Alpha Ethniki
- Season: 1976–77
- Champions: Panathinaikos; 12th Greek title
- Relegated: Panetolikos; Atromitos
- European Cup: Panathinaikos
- UEFA Cup: Olympiacos; AEK Athens
- Cup Winners' Cup: PAOK
- Matches: 306
- Goals: 806 (2.63 per match)
- Top goalscorer: Thanasis Intzoglou (22 goals)

The 1976–77 Alpha Ethniki was the 41st season of the highest football league in Greece. The season began on 3 October 1976 and ended on 27 June 1977. Panathinaikos won their 12th Greek title and their first one in five years.

The point system was: Win: 2 points - Draw: 1 point.

== Teams ==
Promoted from 1975–76 Beta Ethniki	Relegated from 1975–76 Alpha Ethniki
OFI; Kavala	none

Location of teams in 1976–77 Alpha Ethniki

== League table ==
Pos	Team	Pld	W	D	L	GF	GA	GD	Pts	Qualification or relegation
1	Panathinaikos (C)	34	23	8	3	70	20	+50	54	Qualification for European Cup first round
2	Olympiacos	34	23	6	5	70	27	+43	52	Qualification for UEFA Cup first round
3	PAOK	34	21	10	3	63	27	+36	52	Qualification for Cup Winners' Cup first round (Note: Since Panathinaikos, winners of 1976–77 Greek Cup, were qualified for the 1977–78 European Cup, runners-up PAOK earned a spot in the first round of the 1977–78 European Cup Winners' Cup.)
4	AEK Athens	34	24	3	7	63	29	+34	51	Qualification for UEFA Cup first round
5	Aris	34	17	8	9	58	34	+24	42	
6	OFI	34	14	5	15	57	51	+6	33	
7	Kavala	34	11	10	13	34	38	−4	32	
8	Ethnikos Piraeus	34	13	5	16	47	47	0	31	
9	Panionios	34	10	11	13	35	35	0	31	
10	Kastoria	34	12	7	15	32	45	−13	31	
11	PAS Giannina	34	10	9	15	47	54	−7	29	
12	Pierikos	34	11	5	18	44	61	−17	27	
13	Iraklis	34	10	7	17	33	47	−14	27	
14	Panserraikos	34	9	8	17	35	56	−21	26	
15	Panachaiki	34	11	4	19	36	62	−26	26	
16	Apollon Athens	34	9	8	17	29	54	−25	26	
17	Panetolikos (R)	34	9	8	17	25	51	−26	26	Relegation to Beta Ethniki
18	Atromitos (Note: Atromitos were deducted 2 points.) (R)	34	6	4	24	28	68	−40	13	Relegation to Beta Ethniki

Source: RSSSF
Rules for classification: 1st points; 2nd total goal ratio; 3rd decision match.
(C) Champions; (R) Relegated

== Results ==
Home \ Away	AEK	APA	ARIS	ATR	ETH	IRA	KAS	KAV	OFI	OLY	PNC	PAO	PNT	PAN	PNS	PAOK	PAS	PIE
AEK Athens		2–1	2–0	1–0	4–1	1–0	2–1	3–1	4–1	1–0	4–2	0–2	4–0	2–0	4–1	1–0	5–1	2–2
Apollon Athens	0–2		1–2	2–0	1–1	1–1	0–0	0–0	2–0	0–3	2–1	1–2	2–1	1–0	1–0	0–0	3–2	2–1
Aris	0–1	4–1		5–0	1–0	2–0	2–0	0–0	3–1	2–0	3–1	2–1	2–0	1–1	3–2	1–2	0–0	5–1
Atromitos	1–2	0–0	2–4		1–2	3–0	2–0	0–0	0–1	2–4	1–0	1–1	2–1	3–0	1–0	1–6	1–1	1–3
Ethnikos Piraeus	1–0	6–1	0–2	1–0		3–0	1–1	1–0	2–0	1–3	5–1	1–1	5–0	1–0	1–0	1–2	2–3	2–1
Iraklis	1–0	1–0	0–2	5–0	2–1		1–1	3–1	2–0	1–3	1–0	1–2	2–1	1–1	0–0	0–3	2–0	2–1
Kastoria	0–3	3–0	0–0	1–0	1–1	2–1		1–0	2–1	1–0	3–2	3–2	1–0	2–1	3–1	0–2	1–0	1–2
Kavala	0–1	1–2	0–0	1–0	2–1	1–0	1–1		3–0	0–1	5–1	1–0	2–0	0–3	1–0	0–0	4–1	1–1
OFI	1–4	4–1	1–1	3–1	3–0	2–0	1–0	3–1		1–1	3–0	2–2	2–0	5–0	5–0	2–1	1–2	2–0
Olympiacos	2–0	1–1	4–3	5–1	2–0	3–1	4–1	2–1	4–3		9–1	1–1	3–0	1–0	2–0	2–0	0–0	3–0
Panachaiki	0–2	0–0	1–0	2–1	2–1	2–1	3–0	0–2	1–0	0–1		0–0	0–0	1–0	5–0	1–2	3–1	2–1
Panathinaikos	2–0	2–0	4–2	4–1	2–0	2–0	2–0	5–0	3–1	2–0	4–0		4–1	1–0	4–0	0–0	3–0	4–0
Panetolikos	1–3	2–1	2–0	1–0	3–2	1–1	2–0	0–0	1–0	0–0	1–1	0–0		0–0	1–0	1–2	1–1	1–0
Panionios	3–0	2–0	1–0	2–0	0–0	3–1	0–0	4–2	4–1	0–0	3–0	1–2	3–0		1–1	0–0	0–0	1–1
Panserraikos	1–1	1–0	1–1	2–0	1–2	2–1	1–0	1–1	1–1	1–3	2–1	1–2	3–0	3–0		3–3	2–0	1–1
PAOK	0–0	2–0	2–0	2–1	2–1	2–0	2–1	1–1	1–1	2–1	2–0	0–0	2–1	3–0	3–0		1–1	6–1
PAS Giannina	0–1	2–0	1–1	5–1	3–0	1–1	3–0	0–1	4–3	0–1	2–1	0–2	2–0	1–1	0–2	4–5		6–3
Pierikos	3–1	5–2	1–4	1–0	2–0	0–0	2–1	2–0	0–2	0–1	0–1	0–2	1–2	1–0	4–1	1–2	2–0	

Source: RSSSF
Legend: Blue = home team win; Yellow = draw; Red = away team win.

== Top scorers ==
Rank	Player	Club	Goals
1	(Greece) Thanasis Intzoglou	Ethnikos Piraeus	22
2	(Greece) Dimitrios Papadopoulos	OFI	20
3	(Argentina) Óscar Álvarez	Panathinaikos	19
4	(Greece) Antonis Antoniadis	Panathinaikos	18
4	(Greece) Thomas Mavros	AEK Athens	18
6	(Greece) Maik Galakos	Olympiacos	16
7	(Greece) Michalis Kritikopoulos	Olympiacos	15
8	(Greece) Giorgos Ananiadis	Aris	14
9	(Brazil) Neto Guerino	PAOK	13
9	(Greece) Vasilis Karaiskos	OFI	13

== Attendances ==
Olympiacos drew the highest average home attendance in the 1976–77 Alpha Ethniki.

#	Team	Average attendance
1	Olympiacos	26,209
2	Panathinaikos	21,824
3	PAOK	21,607
4	AEK Athens	17,074
5	Iraklis	12,171
6	Ethnikos Piraeus	11,274
7	Aris	11,130
8	Panionios	7,996
9	Panachaiki	7,582
10	Apollon Athens	7,254
11	OFI	6,640
12	Kavala	6,556
13	Panetolikos	6,548
14	PAS Giannina	5,924
15	Atromitos	5,421
16	Pierikos	4,046
17	Panserraikos	3,832
18	Kastoria	2,999
