= 1976–77 Greek Football Cup =

1976–77 Greek Cup
Tournament details
- Country: Greece
- Teams: 58

Final positions
- Champions: Panathinaikos (6th title)
- Runners-up: PAOK

Tournament statistics
- Matches played: 57
- Goals scored: 174 (3.05 per match)

The 1976–77 Greek Football Cup was the 35th edition of the Greek Football Cup. The competition culminated with the Greek Cup Final, held at Karaiskakis Stadium, on 22 June 1977. The match was contested by Panathinaikos and PAOK, with Panathinaikos winning by 2–1.

== Calendar ==
Round	Date(s)	Fixtures	Clubs	New entries
First Round	1 December 1976	29	58 → 29	58
Second Round	5, 6 January 1977	13	29 → 16	none
Round of 16	9, 10, 17 February 1977	8	16 → 8	none
Quarter-finals	17 March 1977	4	8 → 4	none
Semi-finals	8 June 1977	2	4 → 2	none
Final	22 June 1977	1	2 → 1	none

== Knockout phase ==
In the knockout phase, teams play against each other over a single match. If the match ends up as a draw, extra time will be played. If a winner doesn't occur after the extra time the winner emerges by penalty shoot-out.
The mechanism of the draws for each round is as follows:

- There are no seedings, and teams from the same group can be drawn against each other.

== First round ==
Team 1	Score	Team 2
Proodeftiki	1–3	AEK Athens
Panachaiki	2–0	Korinthos
PAS Giannina	3–0	Naoussa
PAOK	3–0	Panthrakikos
Kampaniakos	1–1 (1–3 p)	Panathinaikos
Ethnikos Piraeus	3–1	Apollon Athens
Iraklis	1–0	Panserraikos
Atromitos	3–1	Veria
Apollon Kalamarias	0–1	Aris
Koropi	0–1	OFI
Olympiacos Liosia	2–1	Panionios
Panetolikos	4–2 (a.e.t.)	Olympiacos Volos
Ethnikos Asteras	1–0	Pierikos
Anagennisi Epanomi	1–0	Kavala
Kastoria	2–0	Kalamata
Levadiakos	2–4	Trikala
Lamia	2–0	Irodotos
Anagennisi Karditsa	1–0 (a.e.t.)	Doxa Drama
Almopos Aridea	2–0	Panarkadikos
Pandramaikos	0–1	Fostiras
Orfeas Egaleo	3–2 (a.e.t.)	AEL
Ilisiakos	0–1	Anagennisi Arta
Chania	2–1 (a.e.t.)	Xanthi
Kilkisiakos	1–0	A.F.C. Patra
Kozani	1–0	Rodos
Panelefsiniakos	4–1	Niki Volos
Olympiacos	7–1	Kallithea
Atromitos Piraeus	3–3 (3–4 p)	Paniliakos
Egaleo	2–0	Ethnikos Sidirokastro

== Bracket ==
Second round
Panathinaikos	4
Kozani	0
Trikala (bye)
Egaleo (a.e.t.)	2
Lamia	1
Kastoria (bye)
Chania	1
Olympiacos	2
Anagennisi Karditsa	1
Panetolikos	0
Panachaiki (p)	1(5)
Orfeas Egaleo	1(4)
Aris	5
Anagennisi Arta	1
Ethnikos Asteras	0(2)
Ethnikos Piraeus (p)	0(4)
Olympiacos Liosia	4
Kilkisiakos	1
PAOK (bye)
Iraklis	1
AEK Athens (a.e.t.)	2
Anagennisi Epanomi	2
Panelefsiniakos	0
Paniliakos	1(5)
Almopos Aridea (p)	1(6)
Fostiras	2
OFI	1
PAS Giannina	4
Atromitos	2

Round of 16
Panathinaikos	4
Trikala	2
Egaleo	2
Kastoria	0
Olympiacos	2
Anagennisi Karditsa	0
Panachaiki	1
Aris	0
Ethnikos Piraeus (a.e.t.)	1
Olympiacos Liosia	0
PAOK	2
AEK Athens	1
Anagennisi Epanomi (p)	1(5)
Almopos Aridea	1(3)
Fostiras	2
PAS Giannina	1

Quarter-finals
Panathinaikos	9
Egaleo	0
Olympiacos	2
Panachaiki	1
Ethnikos Piraeus	2
PAOK	3
Anagennisi Epanomi	2
Fostiras (a.e.t.)	3

Semi-finals
Panathinaikos (a.e.t.)	2
Olympiacos	1
PAOK	4
Fostiras	0

Final
Panathinaikos	2
PAOK	1

== Second round ==
Team 1	Score	Team 2
Iraklis	1–2 (a.e.t.)	AEK Athens
Panathinaikos	4–0	Kozani
Chania	1–2	Olympiacos
Aris	5–1	Anagennisi Arta
Ethnikos Asteras	0–0 (2–4 p)	Ethnikos Piraeus
PAS Giannina	4–2	Atromitos
Egaleo	2–1 (a.e.t.)	Lamia
Anagennisi Karditsa	1–0	Panetolikos
Panachaiki	1–1 (5–4 p)	Orfeas Egaleo
Fostiras	2–1	OFI
Olympiacos Liosia	4–1	Kilkisiakos
Anagennisi Epanomi	2–0	Panelefsiniakos
Paniliakos	1–1 (5–6 p)	Almopos Aridea
PAOK	bye	
Kastoria	bye	
Trikala	bye	

== Round of 16 ==
Team 1	Score	Team 2
Panathinaikos	4–2	Trikala
Egaleo	2–0	Kastoria
Panachaiki	1–0	Aris
Anagennisi Epanomi	1–1 (5–3 p)	Almopos Aridea
PAOK	2–1	AEK Athens
Olympiacos	2–0	Anagennisi Karditsa
Fostiras	2–1	PAS Giannina
Ethnikos Piraeus	1–0 (a.e.t.)	Olympiacos Liosia

== Quarter-finals ==
Team 1	Score	Team 2
Olympiacos	2–1	Panachaiki
Panathinaikos	9–0	Egaleo
Anagennisi Epanomi	2–3 (a.e.t.)	Fostiras
Ethnikos Piraeus	2–3	PAOK

== Semi-finals ==
Team 1	Score	Team 2
Panathinaikos	2–1 (a.e.t.)	Olympiacos
PAOK	4–0	Fostiras

== Final ==
22 June 1977
21:00 EEST

Panathinaikos	2–1	PAOK
Papadimitriou 29'; Vakalis 83'	Report	Terzanidis 43'

Karaiskakis Stadium, Piraeus
Attendance: 28,490
Referee: Manolis Platopoulos (Athens)
