= 1967–68 AEK Athens F.C. season =

AEK Athens
1967–68 season
- Chairman: Emmanouil Kalitsounakis (until 26 November); Kosmas Kyriakidis
- Manager: Jenő Csaknády (until 24 July); Branko Stanković
- Stadium: AEK Stadium
- Alpha Ethniki: 1st
- Greek Cup: Semi-finals
- Balkans Cup: Group stage
- Top goalscorer: League: Mimis Papaioannou (19); All: Mimis Papaioannou (21)
- Highest home attendance: 32,382 vs Olympiacos (31 March 1968)
- Lowest home attendance: 4,152 vs Panserraikos (12 November 1967)
- Average home league attendance: 14,440
- Biggest win: AEK Athens 6–1 Vyzas Megara; AEK Athens 5–0 Olympiakos Nicosia
- Biggest defeat: AEK Athens 0–3 Spartak Sofia; Fenerbahçe 3–0 AEK Athens
Home colours

The 1967–68 season was the 44th season in the existence of AEK Athens F.C. and the ninth consecutive season in the top flight of Greek football. They competed in the Alpha Ethniki, the Greek Cup and the Balkans Cup. The season began on 7 October 1967 and finished on 31 August 1968.

== Overview ==
In the summer of 1967, ambitions of AEK Athens for the season were strengthened by the presence of Jenő Csaknády from its beginning. Evaluating the roster, the manager decided that without the need for any major signings, he could turn the club into title favourites. The previous season, in which Csaknády had managed to bring AEK back into title contention despite being six points behind Olympiacos, convinced the club that another championship triumph, similar to that of 1963, was possible. Csaknády instilled discipline and determination within the squad, with the players fully committed to both the team and their manager.

AEK entered the championship race and in their first six matches achieved five wins and a draw in the derby against Panathinaikos at Leoforos Alexandras Stadium. The defeat in Katerini against Pierikos by 1–0 on 29 November temporarily removed them from the top of the standings. The yellow-blacks responded emphatically in the following matchday, when they defeated fellow title contenders Olympiacos 4–1 at Karaiskakis Stadium. As the league race progressed, AEK performed strongly in derby matches throughout the season, achieving five victories in six matches against the three big clubs of Thessaloniki, with Aris being the only side to hold them to a draw on their home ground. With the victory against Panathinaikos at home the yellow-blacks maintained their unbeaten derby record, with the only remaining derby being the match against Olympiacos at Nea Filadelfeia. On 31 March, AEK effectively secured the title on the 26th matchday with their second 2–1 victory over the Piraeus club. The win was celebrated by the thousands of supporters at the stadium, with some of them entering the pitch and taking the jerseys and shorts of the players as souvenirs. The championship was mathematically secured on 4 April, in the 1–0 win against Panelefsiniakos away from home.

While AEK had already been crowned champions, they were also considered favourites to win the Cup, which raised expectations of a domestic double. They entered the round of 32, where they eliminated Vyzas Megara away from home by defeating them 1–2 after extra time. Afterwards, they faced Aris at Thessaloniki for the round of the 16 and qualified with a 0–1 win. In the quarter-final they eliminated Panionios with another 0–1 away win. The semi-final draw brought them against Olympiacos at Karaiskakis Stadium. There, the red and whites managed to take their revenge for their loss of the championship, by eliminating AEK by 2–1 and eventually winning the Cup.

Top scorer of the team in the league was Mimis Papaioannou with 19 goals. The Hungarian-German manager, continuing the "tradition" he had established, decided to leave the club, thereby winning the championship in both of his full seasons at the bench of AEK.

== Management team ==
Position	Staff
Manager	(Hungary) Jenő Csaknády^{[a]}
Academy director	(Greece) Georgios Daispangos
Academy manager	(Greece) Georgios Daispangos

a. Branko Stanković took charge for the remaining matches of the Balkan Cup after the season was over.

== Players ==
=== Squad information ===
NOTE: The players are the ones that have been announced by the AEK Athens' press release. No edits should be made unless a player arrival or exit is announced. Updated 31 August 1968, 23:59 UTC+2.

Player	Nat.	Position(s)	Date of birth (Age)	Signed	Previous club	Transfer fee
Goalkeepers
Stelios Serafidis	(Greece)	GK	6 August 1935 (aged 32)	1953	(Greece) AEK Athens U20	—
Theodoros Maniateas	(Greece)	GK	19 March 1945 (aged 23)	1963	(Greece) Panthisiakos	Free
Stelios Konstantinidis	(Greece)	GK	6 June 1947 (aged 21)	1967	(Greece) AEK Athens U20	—
Defenders
Alekos Sofianidis	(Greece) (Turkey)	LB / LM / LW	3 August 1935 (aged 32)	1959	(Turkey) Beşiktaş	Free
Aleko Yordan	(Turkey) (Greece)	CB	10 January 1938 (aged 30)	1964	(Turkey) Beykoz	Free
Tasos Vasiliou	(Greece)	CB	4 August 1938 (aged 29)	1965	(Greece) Apollon Athens	₯1,200,000
Giorgos Kefalidis	(Greece)	RB / CB	21 March 1941 (aged 27)	1964	(Greece) Pierikos	₯800,000
Fotis Balopoulos	(Greece)	CB / DM / CM / ST	17 December 1943 (aged 24)	1964	(Greece) Proodeftiki	₯450,000
Lakis Frogoudakis	(Greece)	LB / RB / CB / DM	1944 (aged 23–24)	1964	(Greece) AEK Athens U20	—
Giannis Stavrou	(Greece)	RB / LB / CB	6 January 1947 (aged 21)	1967	(Greece) AEK Athens U20	—
Midfielders
Stelios Skevofilakas	(Greece)	LM / RM / AM / CM	6 January 1939 (aged 29)	1961	(Greece) Eleftheroupoli	Free
Panagiotis Ventouris	(Greece)	LM / RM / LW / RW / ST / AM / SS	1 March 1943 (aged 25)	1965	(Greece) Fostiras	₯400,000
Nikos Stathopoulos	(Greece)	LM / LB / CM	8 November 1943 (aged 24)	1966	(Greece) AEK Athens U20	—
Michalis Simigdalas	(Greece)	CM / RM / LM / RB / LB	23 June 1944 (aged 24)	1963	(Greece) AEK Athens U20	—
Giorgos Karafeskos	(Greece)	CM / DM / RM / RW	8 December 1946 (aged 21)	1965	(Greece) AEK Athens U20	—
Forwards
Andreas Stamatiadis (Captain)	(Greece)	RW / LW / SS / AM	16 August 1935 (aged 32)	1952	(Greece) AEK Athens U20	—
Vasilis Mastrakoulis	(Greece)	RW / ST / SS	1939 (aged 28–29)	1966	(Greece) Apollon Athens	₯270,000
Kostas Papageorgiou	(Greece)	ST / SS / RW / LW	1 January 1941 (aged 27)	1963	(Greece) Atromitos	₯200,000
Mimis Papaioannou	(Greece)	SS / ST / AM / RW	17 November 1942 (aged 25)	1962	(Greece) Veria	₯175,000
Spyros Pomonis	(Greece)	LW / LM	12 February 1944 (aged 24)	1960	(Greece) AEK Athens U20	—
Nikos Exarchidis	(Greece)	ST	1944 (aged 23–24)	1966	(Greece) Niki Plaka	Free
Kostas Nikolaidis	(Greece)	RW / LW / SS / ST	10 September 1944 (aged 23)	1965	(Greece) PAO Safraboli	₯400,000
Dimitris Kyrmizas	(Greece)	ST	1947 (aged 20–21)	1967	(Greece) AEK Athens U20	—

== Transfers ==
=== In ===
Pos.	Player	From	Fee	Date	Source
DF	(Greece) Giannis Stavrou	(Greece) AEK Athens U20	Promotion	1 August 1967	
FW	(Greece) Dimitris Kyrmizas	(Greece) AEK Athens U20	Promotion	1 August 1967	

=== Out ===
Pos.	Player	To	Fee	Date	Source
GK	(Greece) Vangelis Petrakis	(Greece) OFI	Free transfer	1 August 1967	
MF	(Greece) Fanis Tasinos	(Greece) Korinthos	Free transfer	1 August 1967	

=== Loan out ===
Pos.	Player	To	Fee	Date	Until	Option to buy	Source
FW	(Greece) Nikos Sevastopoulos	(South Africa) Hellenic	Free	1 July 1967	30 June 1968	✗	

=== Overall transfer activity ===
Expenditure: ▼ ₯0

Income: ▲ ₯0

Net Total: ₯0

== Pre-season and friendlies ==
20 August 1967 Friendly	Rodiakos	1–7	AEK Athens	Rhodes
	Skiathitis 61'	Report	Papageorgiou 15', 43', 58', 80'; Stamatiadis 23'; Nikolaidis 63'; Simigdalas 85'	Stadium: Diagoras Stadium; Attendance: 5,000

27 August 1967 Friendly	AEK Athens	2–3	PAOK	Nea Filadelfeia
17:00 EET (UTC+2)	Papaioannou 51', 67'	Report	Afentoulidis 3'; Sarafis 28'; Katsikaris 76'	Stadium: AEK Stadium; Attendance: 10,180; Referee: Giannis Korkidis (Athens)

30 August 1967 Friendly	AEK Athens	2–0	Ikaros Athens	Nea Filadelfeia
17:00 EET (UTC+2)	Μastrakoulis 61'; Papageorgiou 67'	Report		Stadium: AEK Stadium; Attendance: 3,000
Note: Konstantinidis competed with Ikaros against AEK for the first half and at half-time exchanged positions with Serafidis.

3 September 1967 Friendly	PAOK	2–0	AEK Athens	Thessaloniki
17:00 EET (UTC+2)	Afentoulidis 2'; Fountoukidis 60'	Report		Stadium: Toumba Stadium; Attendance: 18,795; Referee: Nikos Zlatanos (Thessaloniki)

17 September 1967 Friendly	AEK Athens	1–0	Ethnikos Piraeus	Nea Filadelfeia
	Nikolaidis 27'; Yordan (red card) 77'	Report		Stadium: AEK Stadium; Attendance: 7,286; Referee: Thanasis Kreouzis

21 September 1967 Friendly	AEK Athens	6–0	Athinaikos	Nea Filadelfeia
16:00 EET (UTC+2)	Papageorgiou 10', 42', 58'; Μastrakoulis 25'; Kyrmizas 78'; Balopoulos 84'	Report		Stadium: AEK Stadium

24 September 1967 Friendly	AEK Athens	3–0	Panelefsiniakos	Nea Filadelfeia
16:15 EET (UTC+2)	Sofianidis 54' (pen.); Papageorgiou 84', 90'	Report		Stadium: AEK Stadium; Attendance: 4,333; Referee: Eleftheriadis (Athens)

27 September 1967 Friendly	AEK Athens	7–0	Atromitos	Nea Filadelfeia
16:15 EET (UTC+2)	Ventouris 23'; Simigdalas 33'; Papageorgiou 47'; Pomonis 58'; Nikolaidis 67' (pen.), 81'; Skevofilakas 89'	Report		Stadium: AEK Stadium

1 October 1967 Friendly	AEK Athens	0–1	Fostiras	Nea Filadelfeia
		Report	Chatzos 52'	Stadium: AEK Stadium; Attendance: 4,160; Referee: Nikos Giannopoulos (Athens)

1 November 1967 Friendly	AEK Athens	3–2	Eskimo	Nea Filadelfeia
15:15 EET (UTC+2)	Stamatiadis 5'; Papageorgiou 33'; Stathopoulos 38'	Report	Angelopoulos 62'; Vazeos 65'	Stadium: AEK Stadium

== Competitions ==
=== Overall record ===
Competition	First match	Last match	Starting round	Final position	Record							
Competition	First match	Last match	Starting round	Final position	Pld	W	D	L	GF	GA	GD	Win %
Alpha Ethniki	7 October 1967	9 June 1968	Matchday 1	Winners	34	22	6	6	68	24	+44	64.71
Greek Cup	16 June 1968	14 July 1968	Round of 32	Semi-finals	4	3	0	1	5	3	+2	75.00
Balkans Cup	6 March 1968	31 August 1968	Group Stage	Group Stage	6	1	2	3	7	12	−5	16.67
Total					44	26	8	10	80	39	+41	59.09

Last updated: 31 August 1968
Source: Competitions

=== Alpha Ethniki ===
==== League table ====
Pos	Team	Pld	W	D	L	GF	GA	GD	Pts	Qualification or relegation
1	AEK Athens (C)	34	22	6	6	68	24	+44	84	Qualification for European Cup first round
2	Olympiacos	34	21	4	9	63	32	+31	80	Qualification for Cup Winners' Cup first round
3	Panathinaikos	34	17	11	6	44	19	+25	79	Invitation for Inter-Cities Fairs Cup first round
4	Aris	34	16	9	9	61	49	+12	75	Invitation for Inter-Cities Fairs Cup first round
5	Pierikos	34	15	5	14	42	46	−4	69	

Source: RSSSF
Rules for classification: 1st points; 2nd decision match; 3rd head-to-head goal difference.
(C) Champions

==== Results summary ====
Overall								Home						Away					
Pld	W	D	L	GF	GA	GD	Pts	W	D	L	GF	GA	GD	W	D	L	GF	GA	GD
34	22	6	6	68	24	+44	84	14	2	1	44	10	+34	8	4	5	24	14	+10

Source: Competitive matches

==== Results by Matchday ====
Round	1	2	3	4	5	6	7	8	9	10	11	12	13	14	15	16	17	18	19	20	21	22	23	24	25	26	27	28	29	30	31	32	33	34
Ground	A	H	A	H	A	H	A	H	A	A	H	H	A	A	H	Η	A	H	A	H	A	H	A	H	A	H	H	A	A	H	H	A	A	H
Result	W	W	D	W	L	W	W	W	W	D	L	D	L	D	W	W	W	D	W	W	W	W	L	W	D	W	W	W	W	W	W	L	L	W
Position	3	2	2	2	3	2	1	1	1	1	1	1	1	1	1	1	1	2	1	1	1	1	1	1	1	1	1	1	1	1	1	1	1	1

Source: Competitive matches
A = Away; H = Home; W = Win; D = Draw; L = Loss; P = Postponed

==== Matches ====
7 October 1967 1	Panionios	1–2	AEK Athens	Ampelokipoi
16:00 EET (UTC+2)	Intzoglou 17'		Papaioannou 37'; Stamatiadis 87'	Stadium: Leoforos Alexandras Stadium; Attendance: 17,460; Referee: Nikos Giannopoulos (Athens)

15 October 1967 2	AEK Athens	2–0	Apollon Athens	Nea Filadelfeia
15:30 EET (UTC+2)	Ventouris 45'; Karafeskos 74'		Giannibas (red card) 62'	Stadium: AEK Stadium; Attendance: 16,168; Referee: Christos Paschalidis (Athens)

22 October 1967 3	Panathinaikos	1–1	AEK Athens	Ampelokipoi
15:30 EET (UTC+2)	Domazos 14'; Kalaitzidis (red card) 68'		Papaioannou 41'; Yordan (red card) 68'	Stadium: Leoforos Alexandras Stadium; Attendance: 22,887; Referee: Stathis Papavasiliou (Piraeus)

15 November 1967 4	AEK Athens	2–0	PAOK	Nea Filadelfeia
15:00 EET (UTC+2)	Pomonis 75'; Stamatiadis 89'			Stadium: AEK Stadium; Attendance: 12,295; Referee: Stathis Papavasiliou (Piraeus)

29 November 1967 5	Pierikos	1–0	AEK Athens	Katerini
15:00 EET (UTC+2)	Foulidis 29'			Stadium: Katerini Stadium; Attendance: 4,150; Referee: Pimenidis

12 November 1967 6	AEK Athens	4–0	Panserraikos	Nea Filadelfeia
15:00 EET (UTC+2)	Balopoulos 14'; Papaioannou 35', 65', 83'			Stadium: AEK Stadium; Attendance: 4,152; Referee: Kostas Xanthos (Dodecanese)

19 November 1967 7	Proodeftiki	0–2	AEK Athens	Piraeus
15:00 EET (UTC+2)			Sofianidis 18'; Papaioannou 74'	Stadium: Karaiskakis Stadium; Attendance: 18,142; Referee: Timoleon Latsios (Larissa)

20 December 1967 8	AEK Athens	5–0	Olympiakos Nicosia	Nea Filadelfeia
15:00 EET (UTC+2)	Stamatiadis 13'; Nikolaidis 22', 31', 72'; Papaioannou 76'			Stadium: AEK Stadium; Attendance: 7,182; Referee: Lepidas

3 December 1967 9	Olympiacos	1–4	AEK Athens	Piraeus
15:00 EET (UTC+2)	Gioutsos 19'		Karafeskos 8'; Papaioannou 56', 70'; Pomonis 83'	Stadium: Karaiskakis Stadium; Attendance: 33,000; Referee: Leonidas Vamvakopoulos (Athens)

10 December 1967 10	Aris	1–1	AEK Athens	Thessaloniki
15:00 EET (UTC+2)	Alexiadis 69'		Stamatiadis 52'	Stadium: Aris Stadium; Attendance: 18,359; Referee: Timoleon Latsios (Larissa)

17 December 1967 11	AEK Athens	2–3	Ethnikos Piraeus	Nea Filadelfeia
15:00 EET (UTC+2)	Ventouris 82'; Papaioannou 87'		Leventakos 15'; Antonatos 26'; Eleftheriadis (red card) 56'; Chatziioannoglou 70'	Stadium: AEK Stadium; Attendance: 20,262; Referee: Stathis Papavasiliou (Piraeus)

24 December 1967 12	AEK Athens	0–0	Panelefsiniakos	Nea Filadelfeia
15:00 EET (UTC+2)				Stadium: AEK Stadium; Attendance: 11,176; Referee: Christos Dilzas (Thessaloniki)

31 December 1967 13	Olympiacos Volos	1–0	AEK Athens	Anavros
15:00 EET (UTC+2)	Tsouknidas 44'			Stadium: Hunting association of Anavros Stadium; Attendance: 5,829; Referee: Timoleon Latsios (Larissa)

7 January 1968 14	Egaleo	1–1	AEK Athens	Ampelokipoi
15:00 EET (UTC+2)	Chrisostomou 23'		Papaioannou 58'	Stadium: Leoforos Alexandras Stadium; Attendance: 18,113; Referee: Kitsoukalis

14 January 1968 15	AEK Athens	2–1	Veria	Nea Filadelfeia
15:00 EET (UTC+2)	Nikolaidis 3', 29'		Mittas 39'	Stadium: Nikos Goumas Stadium; Attendance: 7,064; Referee: Vlasiadis (Macedonia)

21 January 1968 16	AEK Athens	6–1	Vyzas Megara	Nea Filadelfeia
15:00 EET (UTC+2)	Stamatiadis 9'; Nikolaidis 13'; Papageorgiou 34'; Papaioannou 48', 53', 86'		Kouvas 76'	Stadium: AEK Stadium; Attendance: 5,360; Referee: Nikos Zlatanos (Thessaloniki)

28 January 1968 17	Iraklis	0–2	AEK Athens	Thessaloniki
15:00 EET (UTC+2)			Nikolaidis 30' (pen.); Papaioannou 69'	Stadium: Kaftanzoglio Stadium; Referee: Christos Michas (Athens)

4 February 1968 18	AEK Athens	1–1	Panionios	Nea Filadelfeia
15:30 EET (UTC+2)	Nikolaidis 80' (pen.)		Intzoglou 38'	Stadium: AEK Stadium; Attendance: 25,757; Referee: Stathis Papavasiliou (Piraeus)

11 February 1968 19	Apollon Athens	0–3	AEK Athens	Rizoupoli
15:30 EET (UTC+2)			Papaioannou 64', 86'; Nikolaidis 76'	Stadium: Rizoupoli Stadium; Attendance: 15,000; Referee: Christos Michas (Athens)

18 February 1968 20	AEK Athens	2–1	Panathinaikos	Nea Filadelfeia
15:30 EET (UTC+2)	Nikolaidis 40'; Papaioannou 53'		Grammos 32'; Loukanidis (penalty missed) 87'	Stadium: AEK Stadium; Attendance: 30,811; Referee: Nikos Zlatanos (Thessaloniki)

25 February 1968 21	PAOK	1–2	AEK Athens	Thessaloniki
15:30 EET (UTC+2)	Sidiropoulos (red card) 43'; Giakoumis 80'		Nikolaidis 15'; Stamatiadis 59'	Stadium: Toumba Stadium; Attendance: 22,156; Referee: Christos Michas (Athens)

3 March 1968 22	AEK Athens	2–0	Pierikos	Nea Filadelfeia
15:30 EET (UTC+2)	Stamatiadis 46'; Nikolaidis 79'			Stadium: AEK Stadium; Attendance: 5,907; Referee: Spanos (Patras)

10 March 1968 23	Panserraikos	1–0	AEK Athens	Serres
15:30 EET (UTC+2)	Naskos 68'			Stadium: Serres Municipal Stadium; Attendance: 9,039; Referee: Vangelis Pazaropoulos (Athens)

17 March 1968 24	AEK Athens	3–0	Proodeftiki	Nea Filadelfeia
16:00 EET (UTC+2)	Balopoulos 47'; Nikolaidis 63'; Papageorgiou 84'			Stadium: AEK Stadium; Attendance: 17,218; Referee: Pipergias (Macedonia)

23 March 1968 25	Olympiakos Nicosia	1–1	AEK Athens	Nicosia
16:00 EET (UTC+2)	Lympouris 10'		Yordan 33'	Stadium: GSP Stadium; Attendance: 6,867; Referee: Timoleon Latsios (Larissa)

31 March 1968 26	AEK Athens	2–1	Olympiacos	Nea Filadelfeia
16:00 EET (UTC+2)	Nikolaidis 49' (pen.), 84'		Zanteroglou 27'	Stadium: AEK Stadium; Attendance: 32,382; Referee: Eleftheriadis (Athens)

7 April 1968 27	AEK Athens	1–0	Aris	Nea Filadelfeia
16:00 EET (UTC+2)	Papageorgiou 80'			Stadium: AEK Stadium; Attendance: 20,805; Referee: Christos Michas (Athens)

14 April 1968 28	Ethnikos Piraeus	1–3	AEK Athens	Piraeus
16:00 EET (UTC+2)	Antonatos 39'		Stamatiadis 4', 43'; Papageorgiou 68'	Stadium: Karaiskakis Stadium; Attendance: 30,985; Referee: Timoleon Latsios (Larissa)

22 April 1968 29	Panelefsiniakos	0–1	AEK Athens	Elefsina
16:30 EET (UTC+2)	Karmponis (red card) 81'		Stamatiadis 33'	Stadium: Municipal Stadium of Elefsina; Attendance: 5,500; Referee: Petros Tzouvaras (Thessaly)

5 May 1968 30	AEK Athens	5–1	Olympiacos Volos	Nea Filadelfeia
16:30 EET (UTC+2)	Nikolaidis 41', 76'; Papageorgiou 57', 70'; Stamatiadis 64'		Synetopoulos 82'	Stadium: AEK Stadium; Attendance: 9,871; Referee: Goudas (Piraeus)

19 May 1968 31	AEK Athens	3–1	Egaleo	Nea Filadelfeia
17:00 EET (UTC+2)	Stamatiadis 11'; Papageorgiou 61'; Papaioannou 75'		Lardas 24'	Stadium: AEK Stadium; Attendance: 7,722; Referee: Vlasiadis (Macedonia)

26 May 1968 32	Veria	1–0	AEK Athens	Veria
17:30 EET (UTC+2)	Papadopoulos 46'			Stadium: Veria Stadium; Attendance: 5,724; Referee: Timoleon Latsios (Larissa)

5 June 1968 33	Vyzas Megara	2–1	AEK Athens	Megara
17:30 EET (UTC+2)	Kouvas 11'; Skrivanos 56'		Nikolaidis 70'	Stadium: Megara Stadium; Referee: Kostas Dikopoulos (Larissa)

9 June 1968 34	AEK Athens	2–0	Iraklis	Nea Filadelfeia
17:30 EET (UTC+2)	Stamatiadis 46'; Papageorgiou 87'			Stadium: AEK Stadium; Attendance: 11,290; Referee: Christos Michas (Athens)

=== Greek Cup ===
AEK entered the Greek Cup at the round of 32.

==== Matches ====
16 June 1968 Round of 32	Vyzas Megara	1–2 (a.e.t.)	AEK Athens	Megara
17:00 EET (UTC+2)	Deskos (red card) 85'; Sourounis 90'		Papageorgiou 77'; Ventouris (red card) 85'; Nikolaidis 113'	Stadium: Megara Stadium; Attendance: 4,000; Referee: Michalis Kyriakidis (Cyprus)

30 June 1968 Round of 16	Aris	0–1	AEK Athens	Thessaloniki
17:00 EET (UTC+2)			Papaioannou 57'	Stadium: Aris Stadium; Attendance: 15,000; Referee: Leonidas Vamvakopoulos (Athens)

7 July 1968 Quarter-finals	Panionios	0–1	AEK Athens	Nea Smyrni
17:00 EET (UTC+2)			Papageorgiou 64'	Stadium: Nea Smyrni Stadium; Attendance: 12,000; Referee: Eleftheriadis (Athens)

14 July 1968 Semi-finals	Olympiacos	2–1	AEK Athens	Piraeus
17:00 EET (UTC+2)	P. Vasiliou 17'; Botinos 55'		Papageorgiou 75'	Stadium: Karaiskakis Stadium; Attendance: 30,000; Referee: Leonidas Vamvakopoulos (Athens)

=== Balkans Cup ===
Pos	Team	Pld	W	D	L	GF	GA	GR	Pts	Qualification
1	(Bulgaria) Spartak Sofia (A)	6	4	1	1	10	3	3.333	9	Advances to finals
2	(Socialist Federal Republic of Yugoslavia) Olimpija Ljubljana	6	2	3	1	10	6	1.667	7	
3	(Greece) AEK Athens	6	1	2	3	7	12	0.583	4	
4	(Turkey) Fenerbahçe	6	1	2	3	5	11	0.455	4	

Source: rsssf.com
Rules for classification: 1) points; 2) goal average; 3) number of goals scored
(A) Advance to a further round

==== Matches ====
6 March 1968 1	AEK Athens (Greece)	0–0	(Socialist Federal Republic of Yugoslavia) Olimpija Ljubljana	Athens, Greece
15:30 EET (UTC+2)				Stadium: AEK Stadium; Attendance: 6,302; Referee: Todor Gerov (Bulgaria)

3 April 1968 2	AEK Athens (Greece)	3–1	(Turkey) Fenerbahçe	Athens, Greece
	Karafeskos 36' (pen.); Ventouris 38', 81'		Aktuna 65' (pen.)	Stadium: AEK Stadium; Attendance: 8,933; Referee: Josip Horvat (Yugoslavia)

15 May 1968 3	AEK Athens (Greece)	0–3	(Bulgaria) Spartak Sofia	Athens, Greece
17:00 EET (UTC+2)			Vasiliev 11'; Mitkov 43'; Tsvetkov 79'	Stadium: AEK Stadium; Attendance: 6,460; Referee: Doğan Babacan (Turkey)

3 July 1968 4	Olimpija Ljubljana (Socialist Federal Republic of Yugoslavia)	3–3	(Greece) AEK Athens	Ljubljana, Yugoslavia
17:30 EET (UTC+2)	Ameršek 4'; Bečejac 27', (red card) 34'; Rogič 87'		Papaioannou 14'; Stamatiadis 60'; Yordan (red card) 70'; Pomonis 75'; Vasiliou (red card) 83'	Stadium: Bežigrad Stadium; Attendance: 1,520; Referee: Lado Jakše (Yugoslavia)

28 August 1968 5	Spartak Sofia (Bulgaria)	2–1	(Greece) AEK Athens	Pernik, Bulgaria
	Tsvetkov 28', 84'		Ventouris 43'	Stadium: Stadion Minyor; Referee: Dimitar Rumenchev (Bulgaria)

31 August 1968 6	Fenerbahçe (Turkey)	3–0	(Greece) AEK Athens	Istanbul, Turkey
16:15 EET (UTC+2)	Doğan 25'; Nunweiller 65'; Bartu 86'			Stadium: Ali Sami Yen Stadium; Referee: Constantin Ghiță (Romania)

== Statistics ==
=== Squad statistics ===
As of 31 August 1968

No.	Pos	Player	Alpha Ethniki		Greek Cup		Balkans Cup		Total	
No.	Pos	Player	Apps	Goals	Apps	Goals	Apps	Goals	Apps	Goals
Goalkeepers
—	GK	(Kingdom of Greece) Stelios Serafidis	23	0	4	0	6	0	33	0
—	GK	(Kingdom of Greece) Theodoros Maniateas	11	0	0	0	4	0	15	0
—	GK	(Kingdom of Greece) Stelios Konstantinidis	0	0	0	0	0	0	0	0
Defenders
—	DF	(Kingdom of Greece) Alekos Sofianidis	30	1	4	0	5	0	39	1
—	DF	(Turkey) Aleko Yordan	20	1	4	0	5	0	29	1
—	DF	(Kingdom of Greece) Tasos Vasiliou	33	0	3	0	4	0	40	0
—	DF	(Kingdom of Greece) Giorgos Kefalidis	11	0	1	0	5	0	17	0
—	DF	(Kingdom of Greece) Fotis Balopoulos	30	2	3	0	5	0	38	2
—	DF	(Kingdom of Greece) Lakis Frogoudakis	13	0	0	0	3	0	16	0
—	DF	(Kingdom of Greece) Giannis Stavrou	0	0	0	0	0	0	0	0
Midfielders
—	MF	(Kingdom of Greece) Stelios Skevofilakas	31	0	3	0	5	0	39	0
—	MF	(Kingdom of Greece) Panagiotis Ventouris	18	2	1	0	5	3	24	5
—	MF	(Kingdom of Greece) Nikos Stathopoulos	14	0	1	0	2	0	17	0
—	MF	(Kingdom of Greece) Michalis Simigdalas	0	0	0	0	2	0	2	0
—	MF	(Kingdom of Greece) Giorgos Karafeskos	21	2	3	0	6	1	30	3
Forwards
—	FW	(Kingdom of Greece) Andreas Stamatiadis	33	13	4	0	4	1	41	14
—	FW	(Kingdom of Greece) Vasilis Mastrakoulis	3	0	1	0	2	0	6	0
—	FW	(Kingdom of Greece) Kostas Papageorgiou	11	8	4	3	4	0	19	11
—	FW	(Kingdom of Greece) Mimis Papaioannou	27	19	3	1	4	1	34	21
—	FW	(Kingdom of Greece) Spyros Pomonis	15	2	1	0	2	1	18	3
—	FW	(Kingdom of Greece) Nikos Exarchidis	0	0	0	0	0	0	0	0
—	FW	(Kingdom of Greece) Kostas Nikolaidis	30	18	4	1	4	0	38	19
—	FW	(Kingdom of Greece) Dimitris Kyrmizas	0	0	0	0	0	0	0	0

=== Goalscorers ===
As of 31 August 1968
The list is sorted by competition order when total goals are equal, then by position and then alphabetically by surname.

Rank	Pos.	Player	Alpha Ethniki	Greek Cup	Balkans Cup	Total
1	FW	(Greece) Mimis Papaioannou	19	1	1	21
2	FW	(Greece) Kostas Nikolaidis	18	1	0	19
3	FW	(Greece) Andreas Stamatiadis	13	0	1	14
4	FW	(Greece) Kostas Papageorgiou	8	3	0	11
5	MF	(Greece) Panagiotis Ventouris	2	0	3	5
6	MF	(Greece) Giorgos Karafeskos	2	0	1	3
6	FW	(Greece) Spyros Pomonis	2	0	1	3
8	DF	(Greece) Fotis Balopoulos	2	0	0	2
9	DF	(Turkey) Aleko Yordan	1	0	0	1
9	DF	(Greece) Alekos Sofianidis	1	0	0	1
Own goals			0	0	0	0
Totals			68	5	7	80

=== Hat-tricks ===
Numbers in superscript represent the goals that the player scored.

Player	Against	Result	Date	Competition	Source
(Greece) Mimis Papaioannou	(Greece) Panserraikos	4–0 (H)	12 November 1967	Alpha Ethniki	
(Greece) Kostas Nikolaidis	(Cyprus) Olympiakos Nicosia	5–0 (H)	20 December 1967	Alpha Ethniki	
(Greece) Mimis Papaioannou	(Greece) Vyzas Megara	6–1 (H)	21 January 1968	Alpha Ethniki	

=== Clean sheets ===
As of 31 August 1968
The list is sorted by competition order when total clean sheets are equal and then alphabetically by surname. Clean sheets in games where both goalkeepers participated are awarded to the goalkeeper who started the game. Goalkeepers with no appearances are not included.

Rank	Player	Alpha Ethniki	Greek Cup	Balkans Cup	Total
1	(Greece) Stelios Serafidis	9	2	1	12
2	(Greece) Theodoros Maniateas	4	0	0	4
Totals		13	2	1	16

=== Disciplinary record ===
As of 31 August 1968

N	P	Nat.	Name	Alpha Ethniki			Greek Cup			Balkans Cup			Total			Notes
N	P	Nat.	Name	Yellow card	Second yellow card	Red card	Yellow card	Second yellow card	Red card	Yellow card	Second yellow card	Red card	Yellow card	Second yellow card	Red card	Notes
Goalkeepers
—	GK	(Kingdom of Greece)	Stelios Serafidis													
—	GK	(Kingdom of Greece)	Theodoros Maniateas													
—	GK	(Kingdom of Greece)	Stelios Konstantinidis													
Defenders
—	DF	(Kingdom of Greece)	Alekos Sofianidis													
—	DF	(Turkey)	Aleko Yordan			1						1			2	
—	DF	(Kingdom of Greece)	Tasos Vasiliou									1			1	
—	DF	(Kingdom of Greece)	Giorgos Kefalidis													
—	DF	(Kingdom of Greece)	Fotis Balopoulos													
—	DF	(Kingdom of Greece)	Lakis Frogoudakis													
—	DF	(Kingdom of Greece)	Giannis Stavrou													
Midfielders
—	MF	(Kingdom of Greece)	Stelios Skevofilakas													
—	MF	(Kingdom of Greece)	Panagiotis Ventouris						1						1	
—	MF	(Kingdom of Greece)	Nikos Stathopoulos													
—	MF	(Kingdom of Greece)	Michalis Simigdalas													
—	MF	(Kingdom of Greece)	Giorgos Karafeskos													
Forwards
—	FW	(Kingdom of Greece)	Andreas Stamatiadis													
—	FW	(Kingdom of Greece)	Vasilis Mastrakoulis													
—	FW	(Kingdom of Greece)	Kostas Papageorgiou													
—	FW	(Kingdom of Greece)	Mimis Papaioannou													
—	FW	(Kingdom of Greece)	Spyros Pomonis													
—	FW	(Kingdom of Greece)	Nikos Exarchidis													
—	FW	(Kingdom of Greece)	Kostas Nikolaidis													
—	FW	(Kingdom of Greece)	Dimitris Kyrmizas													

=== Starting 11 ===
This section presents the most frequently used formation along with the players with the most starts across all competitions.

N.	Formation	Matchday(s)
44	4–2–4	1–34

Nat.	Player	Pos.
(Greece)	Stelios Serafidis	GK
(Greece)	Tasos Vasiliou	RCB
(Greece)	Fotis Balopoulos	LCB
(Turkey)	Aleko Yordan	RB
(Greece)	Alekos Sofianidis	LB
(Greece)	Giorgos Karafeskos	RCM
(Greece)	Stelios Skevofilakas	LCM
(Greece)	Andreas Stamatiadis (C)	RW
(Greece)	Panagiotis Ventouris	LW
(Greece)	Mimis Papaioannou	RCF
(Greece)	Kostas Nikolaidis	LCF

Last updated: 1968-08-31
