= 1966–67 AEK Athens F.C. season =

AEK Athens
1966–67 season
- Chairman: Georgios Toubalidis (until 11 October); Michail Trikoglou (until 22 March); Emmanouil Kalitsounakis
- Manager: Tryfon Tzanetis (until 23 December); Georgios Magiras (until 29 January); Jenő Csaknády
- Stadium: AEK Stadium
- Alpha Ethniki: 2nd
- Greek Cup: Quarter-finals
- European Cup Winners' Cup: First round
- Balkans Cup: Runners-up
- Top goalscorer: League: Panagiotis Ventouris (13); All: Mimis Papaioannou (22)
- Highest home attendance: 31,920 vs Olympiacos (29 January 1967)
- Lowest home attendance: 3,000 vs Athinaikos (14 May 1967)
- Average home league attendance: 14,908
- Biggest win: Aspida Xanthi 1–5 AEK Athens; AEK Athens 5–1 Panserraikos; Vyzas Megara 0–4 AEK Athens; AEK Athens 4–0 Athinaikos
- Biggest defeat: Fenerbahçe 3–1 AEK Athens
Home colours

The 1966–67 season was the 43rd season in the existence of AEK Athens F.C. and the eighth consecutive season in the top flight of Greek football. They competed in the Alpha Ethniki, the Greek Cup, the European Cup Winners' Cup and the Balkans Cup. The season began on 1 March 1966 and finished on 30 May 1968.

== Overview ==
The performance of AEK Athens in the previous season's championship may have left them disappointed at missing out on the title, but taking into account the injustice and punishments they suffered, combined with the abstention of Mimis Papaioannou, gave the impression that the club was ready for the new championship race without significant transfer additions. The departures of Giorgos Petridis and above all, of Kostas Nestoridis, after nine active seasons at the club, did not disturb the manager, Tryfon Tzanetis. He did not make any significant signings, as he considered the existing squad, assembled gradually during the early 1960s, sufficient to meet the club's needs. The only addition was the forward of Apollon Athens, Vasilis Mastrakoulis as a backup choice to Mimis Papaioannou and Kostas Papageorgiou who had formed an irreplaceable attacking duo. As far as covering the gap in the midfield was concerned, this was filled with the return of the versatile Panagiotis Ventouris, after the end of his spell in South Africa during the previous season.

AEK started the season in the first round of the European Cup Winners' Cup. Their opponent was the Braga, who in the previous season had won their first title and made their maiden appearance in European competitions. The club's performance in both legs was not enough as they were eliminated after losing both legs.

The championship race started with Olympiacos of Márton Bukovi taking a head start after achieving 11 straight victories in the same number of matches. In December, Tzanetis unexpectedly decided to resign from the bench of the club. After about a month with Georgios Magiras taking charge of the team temporarily, the administration decided to bring back Jenő Csaknády after three and a half years. The Hungarian-German manager made an immediate impact, achieving two victories in his first two matches, including a home win against Olympiacos, reducing the gap to four points. The imposing 5–1 victory over Panserraikos on 16 April reduced the distance even more to three points from Olympiacos.

However, five days later, the championship was interrupted for over a month, as the football stadiums were used by the military junta, that had meanwhile been imposed on the country as gathering places for arrested dissidents. Sports matches were among the first public events to resume under the regime. AEK returned to action on 21 May, winning 2–0 against Egaleo away from home, which combined with the draw of the red and whites reduced the gap to two points. However, a goalless draw against Ethnikos at home, as well as the 1–1 at Karaiskakis Stadium against Olympiacos marked the end of the league race, as they finished second three points behind the red and whites.

In the Cup, AEK, like the other clubs that reached the round of 16 of the previous season, entered directly into the second round where they defeated with ease Athinaikos and Aspida Xanthi, respectively. In the quarter-finals they faced the eventual winners, Panathinaikos and were eliminated by a 2–1 defeat at home.

AEK also competed in the Balkans Cup of the season, placed in the 2nd group alongside FK Vardar, Lokomotiv Sofia and Farul Constanța. They managed to finish first undefeated as they achieved three wins and three draws and qualified for the 2-legged final, facing Fenerbahçe. In the first leg at Nea Filadelfeia, AEK won 2–1 and they went to Istanbul to defend their slight lead. The Turks levelled the aggregate score by winning 1–0 and since the away goals rule was not applied in the tournament, a third match was set. As no suitable date was available, the deciding match was played seven months later and on 30 May 1968 at Mithat Paşa, AEK were defeated by 3–1 and lost a great opportunity to win an international trophy, which was still regarded as a prestigious competition at the time.

== Management team ==
| Position | Staff |
|---|---|
| Manager | (Hungary) Jenő Csaknády |
| Assistant manager | (Greece) Georgios Magiras |
| Academy director | (Greece) Georgios Daispangos |
| Academy manager | (Greece) Georgios Daispangos |

== Players ==
=== Squad information ===
NOTE: The players are the ones that have been announced by the AEK Athens' press release. No edits should be made unless a player arrival or exit is announced. Updated 31 December 1967, 23:59 UTC+2.

| Player | Nat. | Position(s) | Date of birth (Age) | Signed | Previous club | Transfer fee |
Goalkeepers
| Stelios Serafidis | (Greece) | GK | 6 August 1935 (aged 31) | 1953 | (Greece) AEK Athens U20 | — |
| Vangelis Petrakis | (Greece) | GK | 7 September 1938 (aged 28) | 1962 | (Greece) Aris | ₯500,000 |
| Theodoros Maniateas | (Greece) | GK | 19 March 1945 (aged 22) | 1963 | (Greece) Panthisiakos | Free |
| Stelios Konstantinidis | (Greece) | GK | 6 June 1947 (aged 20) | 1967 | (Greece) AEK Athens U20 | — |
Defenders
| Alekos Sofianidis | (Greece) (Turkey) | LB / LM / LW | 3 August 1935 (aged 31) | 1959 | (Turkey) Beşiktaş | Free |
| Aleko Yordan | (Turkey) (Greece) | CB | 10 January 1938 (aged 29) | 1964 | (Turkey) Beykoz | Free |
| Tasos Vasiliou | (Greece) | CB | 4 August 1938 (aged 28) | 1965 | (Greece) Apollon Athens | ₯1,200,000 |
| Giorgos Kefalidis | (Greece) | RB / CB | 21 March 1941 (aged 26) | 1964 | (Greece) Pierikos | ₯800,000 |
| Fotis Balopoulos | (Greece) | CB / DM / CM / ST | 17 December 1943 (aged 23) | 1964 | (Greece) Proodeftiki | ₯450,000 |
| Lakis Frogoudakis | (Greece) | LB / RB / CB / DM | 1944 (aged 22–23) | 1964 | (Greece) AEK Athens U20 | — |
Midfielders
| Stelios Skevofilakas | (Greece) | LM / RM / AM / CM | 6 January 1939 (aged 28) | 1961 | (Greece) Eleftheroupoli | Free |
| Fanis Tasinos | (Greece) | LM / CM / LB | 28 October 1940 (aged 26) | 1963 | (Greece) Pagkorinthiakos | ₯500,000 |
| Panagiotis Ventouris | (Greece) | LM / RM / LW / RW / ST / AM / SS | 1 March 1943 (aged 24) | 1965 | (Greece) Fostiras | ₯400,000 |
| Nikos Stathopoulos | (Greece) | LM / LB / CM | 8 November 1943 (aged 23) | 1966 | (Greece) AEK Athens U20 | — |
| Michalis Simigdalas | (Greece) | CM / RM / LM / RB / LB | 23 June 1944 (aged 23) | 1963 | (Greece) AEK Athens U20 | — |
| Giorgos Karafeskos | (Greece) | CM / DM / RM / RW | 8 December 1946 (aged 20) | 1965 | (Greece) AEK Athens U20 | — |
Forwards
| Andreas Stamatiadis (Captain) | (Greece) | RW / LW / SS / AM | 16 August 1935 (aged 31) | 1952 | (Greece) AEK Athens U20 | — |
| Vasilis Mastrakoulis | (Greece) | RW / ST / SS | 1939 (aged 27–28) | 1966 | (Greece) Apollon Athens | ₯270,000 |
| Kostas Papageorgiou | (Greece) | ST / SS / RW / LW | 1 January 1941 (aged 26) | 1963 | (Greece) Atromitos | ₯200,000 |
| Mimis Papaioannou | (Greece) | SS / ST / AM / RW | 17 November 1942 (aged 24) | 1962 | (Greece) Veria | ₯175,000 |
| Spyros Pomonis | (Greece) | LW / LM | 12 February 1944 (aged 23) | 1960 | (Greece) AEK Athens U20 | — |
| Nikos Exarchidis | (Greece) | ST | 1944 (aged 22–23) | 1966 | (Greece) Niki Plaka | Free |
| Kostas Nikolaidis | (Greece) | RW / LW / SS / ST | 10 September 1944 (aged 22) | 1965 | (Greece) PAO Safraboli | ₯400,000 |
| Nikos Sevastopoulos | (Greece) | RW / SS / AM / ST | 26 February 1945 (aged 22) | 1963 | (Greece) AEK Athens U20 | — |
Left during season
| Giorgos Petridis | (Greece) | AM / SS / ST / LW | 10 February 1938 (aged 29) | 1957 | (Greece) Pera Club | Free |

== Transfers ==
=== In ===
| Pos. | Player | From | Fee | Date | Source |
|---|---|---|---|---|---|
| GK | (Greece) Stelios Konstantinidis | (Greece) AEK Athens U20 | Promotion | 1 April 1967 | |
| MF | (Greece) Michalis Simigdalas | (Australia) Alexander the Great | Loan return | 10 September 1966 | |
| MF | (Greece) Fanis Tasinos | (South Africa) Corinthians Johannesburg | Loan return | 6 February 1967 | |
| MF | (Greece) Nikos Stathopoulos | (Greece) AEK Athens U20 | Promotion | 1 July 1966 | |
| MF | (Greece) Panagiotis Ventouris | (South Africa) Hellenic | Loan return | 6 October 1966 | |
| FW | (Greece) Vasilis Mastrakoulis | (Greece) Apollon Athens | ₯270,000 | 31 July 1966 | |
| FW | (Greece) Kostas Nikolaidis | (Australia) Alexander the Great | Loan return | 10 September 1966 | |
| FW | (Greece) Spyros Pomonis | (Australia) Alexander the Great | Loan return | 10 September 1966 | |
| FW | (Greece) Nikos Sevastopoulos | (Greece) AEK Athens U20 | Promotion | 8 April 1967 | |
| FW | (Greece) Kostas Nestoridis | (Australia) South Melbourne Hellas | Loan return | 1 December 1966 | |
| FW | (Greece) Kostas Papageorgiou | (Australia) Alexander the Great | Loan return | 10 September 1966 | |
| FW | (Greece) Nikos Exarchidis | (Greece) Niki Plaka | Free transfer | 1 August 1966 | |

=== Out ===
| Pos. | Player | To | Fee | Date | Source |
|---|---|---|---|---|---|
| DF | (Greece) Theofilos Vernezis | (Greece) Panegialios | Contract termination | 31 July 1966 | |
| MF | (Greece) Giorgos Petridis | (Greece) Vyzas Megara | Free transfer | 30 July 1966 | |
| FW | (Greece) Kostas Nestoridis | (Greece) Vyzas Megara | Free transfer | 13 January 1967 | |

=== Loan out ===
| Pos. | Player | To | Fee | Date | Until | Option to buy | Source |
|---|---|---|---|---|---|---|---|
| MF | (Greece) Michalis Simigdalas | (Australia) Alexander the Great | Free | 15 July 1966 | 9 September 1966 | ✗ | |
| MF | (Greece) Fanis Tasinos | (South Africa) Corinthians Johannesburg | Free | 24 August 1966 | 5 February 1967 | ✗ | |
| FW | (Greece) Kostas Nikolaidis | (Australia) Alexander the Great | Free | 15 July 1966 | 9 September 1966 | ✗ | |
| FW | (Greece) Spyros Pomonis | (Australia) Alexander the Great | Free | 15 July 1966 | 9 September 1966 | ✗ | |
| FW | (Greece) Kostas Papageorgiou | (Australia) Alexander the Great | Free | 15 July 1966 | 9 September 1966 | ✗ | |

=== Overall transfer activity ===
Expenditure: ▼ ₯270,000

Income: ▲ ₯0

Net Total: ▼ ₯270,000

== Pre-season and friendlies ==
| 3 July 1966 Friendly | AEK Athens | 7–1 | AEK Athens U20 | Nea Filadelfeia |
| | Karafeskos 21'; Nikolaidis 26'; Papaioannou 27', 32', 65'; Simigdalas 48', 67' | Report | Maskaleris 77' | Stadium: AEK Stadium; Referee: Tryfon Tzanetis |

| 25 August 1966 New York Champions Cup | Santos | 1–0 | AEK Athens | New York |
| 03:30 EET (UTC+2) | Toninho 30' | Report | | Stadium: Downing Stadium; Attendance: 11,124; Referee: Vincent Daibis (United States) |

| 28 August 1966 New York Champions Cup | Benfica | 2–2 | AEK Athens | New York |
| 10:00 EET (UTC+2) | Eusébio 32'; Santana 59' | Report | Papaioannou 80', 85' | Stadium: Downing Stadium; Attendance: 15,000; Referee: Joe Karannade (United States) |
Note: The match was permanently abandoned when a crowd of Greek expatriates invaded the pitch after AEK equalized the score.

| 3 September 1966 Friendly | New York Greek-American | 0–6 | AEK Athens | New York |
| | | Report | Papaioannou 20', 65', 75'; Karafeskos 30', 82'; Kyrmizas 70' | Stadium: Eintracht Oval |

| 11 September 1966 Friendly | AEK Athens | 4–0 | Ethnikos Piraeus | Nea Filadelfeia |
| 16:30 EET (UTC+2) | Papaioannou 21', 29', 77'; Karafeskos 42' | Report | | Stadium: AEK Stadium; Attendance: 18,109; Referee: Tsatsoglou |

| 18 September 1966 Friendly | AEK Athens | 0–0 | PAOK | Nea Filadelfeia |
| 16:30 EET (UTC+2) | | Report | | Stadium: AEK Stadium; Attendance: 25,000; Referee: Dimosthenis Stathatos (Athens) |

| 22 September 1966 Friendly | PAOK | 2–0 | AEK Athens | Thessaloniki |
| 20:00 EET (UTC+2) | Fountoukidis 44', 79' | Report | Papaioannou (penalty missed) 31' | Stadium: Kaftanzoglio Stadium; Attendance: 15,000; Referee: Velissariou |

| 25 September 1966 Friendly | AEK Athens | 4–0 | Vyzas Megara | Nea Filadelfeia |
| 16:15 EET (UTC+2) | Papaioannou 5'; Nikolaidis 7'; Papageorgiou 53'; Seitaridis 83' (o.g.) | Report | | Stadium: AEK Stadium; Attendance: 7,778; Referee: Leonidas Vamvakopoulos (Athens) |

| 13 October 1966 Friendly | AEK Athens | 3–1 | Panegialios | Nea Filadelfeia |
| 15:00 EET (UTC+2) | Skevofilakas 30'; Stamatiadis 33'; Simigdalas 87' | Report | Marinos 85' | Stadium: AEK Stadium; Attendance: 1,000; Referee: Georgios Magiras |

| 16 October 1966 Friendly | AEK Athens | 2–2 | Panionios | Nea Filadelfeia |
| 15:30 EET (UTC+2) | Papageorgiou 51'; Stamatiadis 66' | Report | Intzoglou 61' (pen.), 83' | Stadium: AEK Stadium; Attendance: 3,000; Referee: Kastanos (Athens) |

| 19 October 1966 Friendly | AEK Athens | 3–0 | Egaleo | Nea Filadelfeia |
| 15:30 EET (UTC+2) | Papaioannou 7'; Skevofilakas 59'; Ventouris 75' | Report | | Stadium: AEK Stadium; Referee: Manolis Platopoulos (Athens) |

| 30 November 1966 Friendly | AEK Athens | 1–2 | Greece military | Nea Filadelfeia |
| 15:00 EET (UTC+2) | Stathopoulos 66' | Report | Alexiadis 15'; Leventakos 77' | Stadium: AEK Stadium; Referee: Christos Karasoulas (Athens) |
Note: Karafeskos played with Greece military against AEK, since he was serving in the Greek Army at the time.

| 27 December 1966 Friendly | AEK Athens | 2–1 | Torpedo Moscow | Nea Filadelfeia |
| 15:00 EET (UTC+2) | Pomonis 2', 53' | Report | Voronin 35' | Stadium: AEK Stadium; Attendance: 10,657; Referee: Lefas (Piraeus) |

| 10 May 1967 Friendly | AEK Athens | 4–0 | PAO Safraboli | Nea Filadelfeia |
| 17:00 EET (UTC+2) | Nikolaidis 25', 63'; Papageorgiou 76'; Simigdalas 83' | Report | | Stadium: AEK Stadium; Referee: Vattas |

== Competitions ==
=== Overall record ===
| Competition | First match | Last match | Starting round | Final position | Record | | | | | | | |
| Competition | First match | Last match | Starting round | Final position | Pld | W | D | L | GF | GA | GD | Win % |
|---|---|---|---|---|---|---|---|---|---|---|---|---|
| Alpha Ethniki | 23 October 1966 | 18 June 1967 | Matchday 1 | 2nd | 30 | 18 | 10 | 2 | 52 | 21 | +31 | 60.00 |
| Greek Cup | 14 May 1967 | 25 June 1967 | Round of 32 | Quarter-finals | 3 | 2 | 0 | 1 | 10 | 3 | +7 | 66.67 |
| European Cup Winners' Cup | 28 September 1966 | 5 October 1966 | First round | First round | 2 | 0 | 0 | 2 | 2 | 4 | −2 | 0.00 |
| Balkans Cup | 1 March 1966 | 29 May 1968 | Group Stage | Runners-up | 9 | 4 | 3 | 2 | 13 | 10 | +3 | 44.44 |
| Total | | | | | 44 | 24 | 13 | 7 | 77 | 38 | +39 | 54.55 |

Last updated: 29 May 1968
Source: Competitions

=== Alpha Ethniki ===
==== League table ====
| Pos | Team | Pld | W | D | L | GF | GA | GD | Pts | Qualification or relegation |
|---|---|---|---|---|---|---|---|---|---|---|
| 1 | Olympiacos (C) | 30 | 21 | 7 | 2 | 59 | 17 | +42 | 79 | Qualification for European Cup first round |
| 2 | AEK Athens | 30 | 18 | 10 | 2 | 52 | 21 | +31 | 76 | |
| 3 | Panathinaikos | 30 | 17 | 7 | 6 | 42 | 24 | +18 | 71 | Qualification for Cup Winners' Cup first round |
| 4 | PAOK | 30 | 13 | 11 | 6 | 36 | 20 | +16 | 67 | Invitation for Inter-Cities Fairs Cup first round |
| 5 | Aris | 30 | 14 | 5 | 11 | 38 | 30 | +8 | 63 | |

Source: RSSSF
Rules for classification: 1st points; 2nd decision match; 3rd head-to-head goal difference.
(C) Champions

==== Results summary ====
| Overall | | | | | | | | Home | | | | | | Away | | | | | |
| Pld | W | D | L | GF | GA | GD | Pts | W | D | L | GF | GA | GD | W | D | L | GF | GA | GD |
|---|---|---|---|---|---|---|---|---|---|---|---|---|---|---|---|---|---|---|---|
| 30 | 18 | 10 | 2 | 52 | 21 | +31 | 76 | 12 | 3 | 0 | 33 | 9 | +24 | 6 | 7 | 2 | 19 | 12 | +7 |

Source: Competitive matches

==== Results by Matchday ====
| Round | 1 | 2 | 3 | 4 | 5 | 6 | 7 | 8 | 9 | 10 | 11 | 12 | 13 | 14 | 15 | 16 | 17 | 18 | 19 | 20 | 21 | 22 | 23 | 24 | 25 | 26 | 27 | 28 | 29 | 30 |
|---|---|---|---|---|---|---|---|---|---|---|---|---|---|---|---|---|---|---|---|---|---|---|---|---|---|---|---|---|---|---|
| Ground | A | H | A | H | A | H | A | A | H | A | H | A | A | H | A | H | A | H | A | H | A | H | H | A | H | A | Η | H | A | H |
| Result | W | W | W | D | L | W | W | L | W | D | W | D | W | W | D | W | W | W | D | W | D | D | W | D | W | W | W | D | D | W |
| Position | 3 | 1 | 1 | 2 | 4 | 2 | 2 | 3 | 2 | 2 | 2 | 3 | 3 | 2 | 2 | 2 | 2 | 2 | 2 | 2 | 2 | 2 | 2 | 2 | 2 | 2 | 2 | 2 | 2 | 2 |

Source: Competitive matches
A = Away; H = Home; W = Win; D = Draw; L = Loss; P = Postponed

==== Matches ====
| 23 October 1966 1 | Trikala | 1–2 | AEK Athens | Trikala |
| 15:30 EET (UTC+2) | Charitidis 90' (pen.) | | Papageorgiou 30'; Papaioannou 48', (penalty missed) 78' | Stadium: Trikala Municipal Stadium; Attendance: 9,262; Referee: Luigi Grassi (Switzerland) |

| 30 October 1966 2 | AEK Athens | 2–0 | Vyzas Megara | Nea Filadelfeia |
| 15:30 EET (UTC+2) | Ventouris (penalty missed) 67', 75', 84' | | Vasilakis (red card) 67' | Stadium: AEK Stadium; Attendance: 13,708; Referee: Christos Paschalidis (Athens) |

| 6 November 1966 3 | Panionios | 0–1 | AEK Athens | Nea Smyrni |
| 15:15 EET (UTC+2) | | | Nikolaidis 5' | Stadium: Nea Smyrni Stadium; Attendance: 14,861; Referee: Antonio Vitullo (Italy) |

| 13 November 1966 4 | AEK Athens | 0–0 | Panathinaikos | Nea Filadelfeia |
| 15:15 EET (UTC+2) | | | | Stadium: AEK Stadium; Attendance: 30,855; Referee: Joseph Heymann (Switzerland) |

| 20 November 1966 5 | PAOK | 1–0 | AEK Athens | Thessaloniki |
| 15:00 EET (UTC+2) | Giakoumis 42' | | | Stadium: Toumba Stadium; Attendance: 19,640; Referee: Seren (Switzerland) |

| 27 November 1966 6 | AEK Athens | 3–1 | Iraklis | Nea Filadelfeia |
| 15:00 EET (UTC+2) | Ventouris 8'; Nikolaidis 21'; Pomonis 49' | | Kasapis 57' | Stadium: AEK Stadium; Attendance: 13,629; Referee: Ermenegildo Piantoni (Italy) |

| 4 December 1966 7 | Apollon Athens | 0–1 | AEK Athens | Rizoupoli |
| 15:00 EET (UTC+2) | | | Pomonis 72' | Stadium: Rizoupoli Stadium; Attendance: 9,806; Referee: Nikos Giannopoulos (Athens) |

| 11 December 1966 8 | Aris | 2–0 | AEK Athens | Thessaloniki |
| 15:00 EET (UTC+2) | Grimpelakos 55'; Alexiadis 74' | | | Stadium: Aris Stadium; Attendance: 13,690; Referee: Aharon Shoshani (Israel) |

| 18 December 1966 9 | AEK Athens | 2–1 | Veria | Nea Filadelfeia |
| 15:00 EET (UTC+2) | Skevofilakas (penalty missed) 40'; Ventouris 56'; Stamatiadis 60' | | Papafotiou 19' | Stadium: Nikos Goumas Stadium; Attendance: 8,250; Referee: Ahmed El-Kholy (United Arab Republic) |

| 26 December 1966 10 | Panserraikos | 1–1 | AEK Athens | Serres |
| 15:00 EET (UTC+2) | Tsakiris 78' | | Papaioannou 15' | Stadium: Serres Municipal Stadium; Attendance: 7,619; Referee: Abraham Klein (Israel) |

| 8 January 1967 11 | AEK Athens | 2–1 | Egaleo | Nea Filadelfeia |
| 15:00 EET (UTC+2) | Papaioannou 51', 69' | | Anastopoulos 48' | Stadium: AEK Stadium; Attendance: 12,303; Referee: André Petit (France) |

| 15 January 1967 12 | Pierikos | 4–4 | AEK Athens | Katerini |
| 15:00 EET (UTC+2) | Amanatidis 23', 65'; Foulidis 42'; Liapis 68' | | Pomonis 6'; Skevofilakas 10'; Papaioannou 57'; Nikolaidis 63' | Stadium: Katerini Stadium; Attendance: 2,256; Referee: Thomas Vergotis (Rhodes) |

| 21 January 1967 13 | Ethnikos Piraeus | 1–2 | AEK Athens | Piraeus |
| 15:15 EET (UTC+2) | Leventakos 63' | | Pomonis 73'; Ventouris 86' | Stadium: Karaiskakis Stadium; Attendance: 19,243; Referee: Dimosthenis Stathatos (Athens) |

| 29 January 1967 14 | AEK Athens | 1–0 | Olympiacos | Nea Filadelfeia |
| 15:15 EET (UTC+2) | Papaioannou 88' | | | Stadium: AEK Stadium; Attendance: 31,920; Referee: Francesco De Robbio (Italy) |

| 4 February 1967 15 | Proodeftiki | 1–1 | AEK Athens | Piraeus |
| 15:30 EET (UTC+2) | Sideris 35' | | Papaioannou 31' | Stadium: Karaiskakis Stadium; Attendance: 24,405; Referee: Gottfried Dienst (Switzerland) |

| 12 February 1967 16 | AEK Athens | 2–1 | Trikala | Nea Filadelfeia |
| 15:30 EET (UTC+2) | Ventouris 21'; Vasiliou 90+2' | | Rachavelias 49'; Michailidis (red card) 55' | Stadium: AEK Stadium; Attendance: 10,849; Referee: Stathis Papavasiliou (Piraeus) |

| 19 February 1967 17 | Vyzas Megara | 0–4 | AEK Athens | Megara |
| 15:30 EET (UTC+2) | | | Pomonis 16', 52'; Ventouris 27', 72' | Stadium: Megara Stadium; Attendance: 2,981; Referee: Lefas (Piraeus) |

| 26 February 1967 18 | AEK Athens | 3–0 | Panionios | Nea Filadelfeia |
| 15:30 EET (UTC+2) | Nikolaidis 19', 89'; Pomonis 11' | | | Stadium: AEK Stadium; Attendance: 16,800; Referee: Iosif Ritter (Romania) |

| 5 March 1967 19 | Panathinaikos | 0–0 | AEK Athens | Ampelokipoi |
| 16:00 EET (UTC+2) | | | | Stadium: Leoforos Alexandras Stadium; Attendance: 24,069; Referee: Álvarez (Spain) |

| 12 March 1967 20 | AEK Athens | 2–0 | PAOK | Nea Filadelfeia |
| 16:00 EET (UTC+2) | Papaioannou 15'; Ventouris 34' | | | Stadium: AEK Stadium; Attendance: 13,443; Referee: Wult (Germany) |

| 19 March 1967 21 | Iraklis | 0–0 | AEK Athens | Thessaloniki |
| 16:00 EET (UTC+2) | | | | Stadium: Kaftanzoglio Stadium; Attendance: 5,729; Referee: Vincent Rios (France) |

| 26 March 1967 22 | AEK Athens | 1–1 | Apollon Athens | Nea Filadelfeia |
| 16:00 EET (UTC+2) | Stamatiadis 74' | | Porichis 9' | Stadium: AEK Stadium; Attendance: 15,947; Referee: Josef Bucek (Austria) |
Note: At the 84th minute, while the match was in progress, Serafidis left his post, moved towards Balopoulos and punched him, with the latter collapsing to the ground. The referee stopped the game for a few minutes until Balopoulos recovered. With the end of the match, Serafidis jumped the railing and entered the stands, where he stayed for a few minutes and then immediately run το the locker rooms. Accoarding to his statements, he entered the stands searching for a fan who was insulting him and his family throughout the match, while regarding the incident with Balopoulos, he said that his teammate insulted him twice when he tried to give him instructions. A section of the fans, believing that the match was fixed and combined with the disfavor with the team's administration, besieged the locker rooms after the match. Some attempted to assault Balopoulos and Papaioannou, with the latter being in danger of lynching and ultimately fleeing with the help of the gendarmerie. The result was that the stadium was severely damaged, while the club's offices at Amerikis Square were also besieged.

| 2 April 1967 23 | AEK Athens | 3–0 | Aris | Nea Filadelfeia |
| 15:45 EET (UTC+2) | Vasiliou 62'; Pomonis 72'; Karafeskos 83' | | | Stadium: AEK Stadium; Attendance: 12,011; Referee: Francesco De Robbio (Italy) |

| 9 April 1967 24 | Veria | 0–0 | AEK Athens | Veria |
| 16:00 EET (UTC+2) | | | | Stadium: Veria Stadium; Attendance: 7,242; Referee: Gunter Linn (Germany) |

| 16 April 1967 25 | AEK Athens | 5–1 | Panserraikos | Nea Filadelfeia |
| 16:00 EET (UTC+2) | Ventouris 1'; Nikolaidis 16', 64', 76'; Skevofilakas 62' | | Chatzipantazis (red card) 25'; Bitzidis 81' | Stadium: AEK Stadium; Attendance: 12,445; Referee: Giannis Korkidis (Athens) |

| 21 May 1967 26 | Egaleo | 0–2 | AEK Athens | Ampelokipoi |
| 17:00 EET (UTC+2) | | | Ventouris 66', 85' | Stadium: Leoforos Alexandras Stadium; Attendance: 11,142; Referee: Joseph Hannet (Belgium) |

| 28 May 1967 27 | AEK Athens | 3–0 | Pierikos | Nea Filadelfeia |
| 17:00 EET (UTC+2) | Nikolaidis 20'; Ventouris 86'; Frogoudakis 90' | | | Stadium: AEK Stadium; Attendance: 6,993; Referee: Leonidas Vamvakopoulos (Athens) |

| 4 June 1967 28 | AEK Athens | 0–0 | Ethnikos Piraeus | Nea Filadelfeia |
| 17:30 EET (UTC+2) | | | | Stadium: AEK Stadium; Attendance: 10,153; Referee: Dimitris Protonotarios (Athens) |

| 10 June 1967 29 | Olympiacos | 1–1 | AEK Athens | Piraeus |
| 17:30 EET (UTC+2) | Gaitatzis 18' | | Papaioannou 14' | Stadium: Karaiskakis Stadium; Attendance: 35,445; Referee: Kenneth Dagnall (England) |

| 18 June 1967 30 | AEK Athens | 4–3 | Proodeftiki | Nea Filadelfeia |
| 17:30 EET (UTC+2) | Papaioannou 8'; Pomonis 48'; Nikolaidis 59', 88' | | Tsachouridis 30'; Gripaios 56'; Makanas 71' | Stadium: AEK Stadium; Attendance: 3,616; Referee: Eleftheriadis (Athens) |

=== Greek Cup ===
AEK entered the Greek Cup at the round of 32.

==== Matches ====
| 14 May 1967 Round of 32 | AEK Athens | 4–0 | Athinaikos | Nea Filadelfeia |
| 16:00 EET (UTC+2) | Papaioannou 28'; Ventouris 34'; Papageorgiou 44'; Nikolaidis 55' | | | Stadium: AEK Stadium; Attendance: 3,000; Referee: Leventas |

| 14 June 1967 Round of 16 | Aspida Xanthi | 1–5 | AEK Athens | Xanthi |
| 17:00 EET (UTC+2) | Tsagalidis 82' (pen.) | | Nikolaidis 6', 56', 88'; Papaioannou 9', 65' | Stadium: Municipal Ground of Xanthi; Attendance: 4,452; Referee: Timoleon Latsios (Larissa) |

| 25 June 1967 Quarter-finals | AEK Athens | 1–2 | Panathinaikos | Nea Filadelfeia |
| 17:00 EET (UTC+2) | Skevofilakas 35' | | Loukanidis 55'; Papaemmanouil 62' | Stadium: AEK Stadium; Attendance: 27,517; Referee: Fulvio Pieroni (Italy) |

=== European Cup Winners' Cup ===
==== First round ====
| 28 September 1966 First leg | AEK Athens (Greece) | 0–1 | (Portugal) Braga | Athens, Greece |
| 16:00 EET (UTC+2) | | Report | Luciano 26' | Stadium: AEK Stadium; Attendance: 23,207; Referee: Josip Horvat (Yugoslavia) |

| 5 October 1966 Second leg | Braga (Portugal) | 3–2 (4–2 agg.) | (Greece) AEK Athens | Braga, Portugal |
| 17:00 EET (UTC+2) | Espingardeiro 15'; Perrichon 30', 44' | Report | Papaioannou 6'; Coimbra 87' (o.g.) | Stadium: Estádio 1º de Maio; Attendance: 13,892; Referee: John Adair (Northern Ireland) |

=== Balkans Cup ===
==== Group B ====
| Pos | Team | Pld | W | D | L | GF | GA | GR | Pts | Qualification |
|---|---|---|---|---|---|---|---|---|---|---|
| 1 | (Greece) AEK Athens (A) | 6 | 3 | 3 | 0 | 10 | 5 | 2.000 | 9 | Advances to finals |
| 2 | (Bulgaria) Lokomotiv Sofia | 6 | 2 | 2 | 2 | 11 | 10 | 1.100 | 6 | |
| 3 | (Romania) Farul Constanța | 6 | 2 | 1 | 3 | 8 | 14 | 0.571 | 5 | |
| 4 | (Socialist Federal Republic of Yugoslavia) FK Vardar | 6 | 1 | 2 | 3 | 6 | 6 | 1.000 | 4 | |

Source: rsssf.com
Rules for classification: 1) points; 2) goal average; 3) number of goals scored
(A) Advance to a further round

==== Matches ====
===== Group stage =====
| 1 March 1966 1 | Lokomotiv Sofia (Bulgaria) | 3–3 | (Greece) AEK Athens | Sofia, Bulgaria |
| 16:00 EET (UTC+2) | Georgiev 27'; Mihalyov 77'; Debarski 78' | Report | Papaioannou 37'; Nikolaidis 47'; Karafeskos 71' | Stadium: Balgarska Armia Stadium; Attendance: 30,000; Referee: Vladimir Stanković (Yugoslavia) |

| 8 June 1966 2 | AEK Athens (Greece) | 1–0 | (Bulgaria) Lokomotiv Sofia | Athens, Greece |
| 17:30 EET (UTC+2) | Papaioannou 68' | Report | | Stadium: AEK Stadium; Attendance: 9,701; Referee: Stelios Mavrogenis (Cyprus) |

| 14 December 1966 3 | AEK Athens (Greece) | 3–0 | (Romania) Farul Constanța | Athens, Greece |
| 15:00 EET (UTC+2) | Pomonis 16'; Papaioannou 19', 85' | | | Stadium: AEK Stadium; Attendance: 5,000 |

| 19 April 1967 4 | AEK Athens (Greece) | 1–0 | (Socialist Federal Republic of Yugoslavia) FK Vardar | Athens, Greece |
| 16:30 EET (UTC+2) | Papageorgiou 50' | | | Stadium: AEK Stadium; Attendance: 8,813; Referee: Andreas Kouniaidis (Cyprus) |

| 6 September 1967 5 | FK Vardar (Socialist Federal Republic of Yugoslavia) | 1–1 | (Greece) AEK Athens | Skopje, Yugoslavia |
| 20:00 EET (UTC+2) | Manolov (penalty missed) 60'; Mojsov 85' | | Papaioannou 18' | Stadium: Gradski; Attendance: 7,000; Referee: Ratko Čanak (Yugoslavia) |
Note: Due to the blockade from the Eastern Bloc, Jenő Csaknády could not enter Yugoslavia, the academy manager, Georgios Daispangos took his place.

| 13 September 1967 6 | Farul Constanța (Romania) | 1–1 | (Greece) AEK Athens | Constanța, Romania |
| 16:30 EET (UTC+2) | Ologu 87'; Tilvescu (penalty missed) 90+3' | | Papaioannou 75' | Stadium: Stadionul Farul; Attendance: 8,000; Referee: Vasile Dumitrescu (Romania) |
Note: Due to the blockade from the Eastern Bloc, Jenő Csaknády could not enter Yugoslavia, the academy manager, Georgios Daispangos took his place.

===== Finals =====
| 11 October 1967 First leg | AEK Athens (Greece) | 2–1 | (Turkey) Fenerbahçe | Athens, Greece |
| 16:00 EET (UTC+2) | Papaioannou 14'; Sofianidis 42' (pen.) | Report | Soydan 16' | Stadium: AEK Stadium; Attendance: 24,200; Referee: Luben Spasov (Bulgaria) |

| 26 October 1967 Second leg | Fenerbahçe (Turkey) | 1–0 | (Greece) AEK Athens | Istanbul, Turkey |
| 20:00 EET (UTC+2) | Aktuna 45+1' (pen.) | | | Stadium: Fenerbahçe Stadium; Attendance: 42,181; Referee: Božidar Botić (Yugoslavia) |

| 29 May 1968 Play–off | Fenerbahçe (Turkey) | 3–1 | (Greece) AEK Athens | Istanbul, Turkey |
| | Altıparmak 2', 70'; Şen 33' | | Papaioannou 71' | Stadium: Mithatpaşa Stadium; Attendance: 24,817; Referee: Teodor Bechirov (Bulgaria) |

== Statistics ==
=== Squad statistics ===
As of 29 May 1968

| No. | Pos | Player | Alpha Ethniki | | Greek Cup | | European Cup Winners' Cup | | Balkans Cup | | Total | |
| No. | Pos | Player | Apps | Goals | Apps | Goals | Apps | Goals | Apps | Goals | Apps | Goals |
Goalkeepers
| — | GK | (Kingdom of Greece) Stelios Serafidis | 22 | 0 | 2 | 0 | 0 | 0 | 7 | 0 | 31 | 0 |
| — | GK | (Kingdom of Greece) Vangelis Petrakis | 6 | 0 | 1 | 0 | 1 | 0 | 2 | 0 | 10 | 0 |
| — | GK | (Kingdom of Greece) Theodoros Maniateas | 2 | 0 | 0 | 0 | 2 | 0 | 2 | 0 | 6 | 0 |
| — | GK | (Kingdom of Greece) Stelios Konstantinidis | 0 | 0 | 0 | 0 | 0 | 0 | 0 | 0 | 0 | 0 |
Defenders
| — | DF | (Kingdom of Greece) Alekos Sofianidis | 28 | 0 | 3 | 0 | 2 | 0 | 6 | 1 | 39 | 1 |
| — | DF | (Turkey) Aleko Yordan | 5 | 0 | 3 | 0 | 0 | 0 | 6 | 0 | 14 | 0 |
| — | DF | (Kingdom of Greece) Tasos Vasiliou | 30 | 2 | 2 | 0 | 2 | 0 | 9 | 0 | 43 | 2 |
| — | DF | (Kingdom of Greece) Giorgos Kefalidis | 14 | 0 | 0 | 0 | 0 | 0 | 4 | 0 | 18 | 0 |
| — | DF | (Kingdom of Greece) Fotis Balopoulos | 25 | 0 | 1 | 0 | 2 | 0 | 8 | 0 | 36 | 0 |
| — | DF | (Kingdom of Greece) Lakis Frogoudakis | 18 | 1 | 3 | 0 | 1 | 0 | 4 | 0 | 26 | 1 |
Midfielders
| — | MF | (Kingdom of Greece) Stelios Skevofilakas | 23 | 2 | 3 | 1 | 2 | 0 | 7 | 0 | 35 | 3 |
| — | MF | (Kingdom of Greece) Fanis Tasinos | 0 | 0 | 0 | 0 | 0 | 0 | 0 | 0 | 0 | 0 |
| — | MF | (Kingdom of Greece) Panagiotis Ventouris | 25 | 13 | 1 | 1 | 0 | 0 | 6 | 0 | 32 | 14 |
| — | MF | (Kingdom of Greece) Nikos Stathopoulos | 16 | 0 | 1 | 0 | 1 | 0 | 3 | 0 | 21 | 0 |
| — | MF | (Kingdom of Greece) Michalis Simigdalas | 1 | 0 | 0 | 0 | 0 | 0 | 1 | 0 | 2 | 0 |
| — | MF | (Kingdom of Greece) Giorgos Karafeskos | 15 | 1 | 2 | 0 | 2 | 0 | 9 | 1 | 28 | 2 |
Forwards
| — | FW | (Kingdom of Greece) Andreas Stamatiadis | 24 | 2 | 2 | 0 | 1 | 0 | 8 | 0 | 35 | 2 |
| — | FW | (Kingdom of Greece) Vasilis Mastrakoulis | 9 | 0 | 0 | 0 | 2 | 0 | 4 | 0 | 15 | 0 |
| — | FW | (Kingdom of Greece) Kostas Papageorgiou | 3 | 1 | 1 | 1 | 1 | 0 | 4 | 1 | 9 | 3 |
| — | FW | (Kingdom of Greece) Mimis Papaioannou | 22 | 10 | 3 | 3 | 2 | 1 | 9 | 8 | 36 | 22 |
| — | FW | (Kingdom of Greece) Spyros Pomonis | 18 | 9 | 2 | 0 | 1 | 0 | 4 | 1 | 25 | 10 |
| — | FW | (Kingdom of Greece) Nikos Exarchidis | 0 | 0 | 0 | 0 | 0 | 0 | 0 | 0 | 0 | 0 |
| — | FW | (Kingdom of Greece) Kostas Nikolaidis | 24 | 11 | 3 | 4 | 1 | 0 | 9 | 1 | 37 | 16 |
| — | FW | (Kingdom of Greece) Nikos Sevastopoulos | 0 | 0 | 0 | 0 | 0 | 0 | 0 | 0 | 0 | 0 |
Left during season
| — | MF | (Kingdom of Greece) Giorgos Petridis | 0 | 0 | 0 | 0 | 0 | 0 | 1 | 0 | 1 | 0 |

=== Goalscorers ===
As of 29 May 1968
The list is sorted by competition order when total goals are equal, then by position and then alphabetically by surname.

| Rank | Pos. | Player | Alpha Ethniki | Greek Cup | European Cup Winners' Cup | Balkans Cup | Total |
|---|---|---|---|---|---|---|---|
| 1 | FW | (Greece) Mimis Papaioannou | 10 | 3 | 1 | 8 | 22 |
| 2 | FW | (Greece) Kostas Nikolaidis | 11 | 4 | 0 | 1 | 16 |
| 3 | MF | (Greece) Panagiotis Ventouris | 13 | 1 | 0 | 0 | 14 |
| 4 | FW | (Greece) Spyros Pomonis | 9 | 0 | 0 | 1 | 10 |
| 5 | MF | (Greece) Stelios Skevofilakas | 2 | 1 | 0 | 0 | 3 |
| 5 | FW | (Greece) Kostas Papageorgiou | 1 | 1 | 0 | 1 | 3 |
| 7 | DF | (Greece) Tasos Vasiliou | 2 | 0 | 0 | 0 | 2 |
| 7 | FW | (Greece) Andreas Stamatiadis | 2 | 0 | 0 | 0 | 2 |
| 7 | MF | (Greece) Giorgos Karafeskos | 1 | 0 | 0 | 1 | 2 |
| 10 | DF | (Greece) Lakis Frogoudakis | 1 | 0 | 0 | 0 | 1 |
| 10 | DF | (Greece) Alekos Sofianidis | 0 | 0 | 0 | 1 | 1 |
| Own goals | | | 0 | 0 | 1 | 0 | 1 |
| Totals | | | 52 | 10 | 2 | 13 | 77 |

=== Hat-tricks ===
Numbers in superscript represent the goals that the player scored.

| Player | Against | Result | Date | Competition | Source |
|---|---|---|---|---|---|
| (Greece) Kostas Nikolaidis | (Greece) Panserraikos | 5–1 (H) | 16 April 1967 | Alpha Ethniki | |
| (Greece) Kostas Nikolaidis | (Greece) Aspida Xanthi | 5–1 (A) | 14 June 1967 | Greek Cup | |

=== Clean sheets ===
As of 29 May 1968
The list is sorted by competition order when total clean sheets are equal and then alphabetically by surname. Clean sheets in games where both goalkeepers participated are awarded to the goalkeeper who started the game. Goalkeepers with no appearances are not included.

| Rank | Player | Alpha Ethniki | Greek Cup | European Cup Winners' Cup | Balkans Cup | Total |
|---|---|---|---|---|---|---|
| 1 | (Greece) Stelios Serafidis | 12 | 1 | 0 | 2 | 15 |
| 2 | (Greece) Vangelis Petrakis | 3 | 0 | 0 | 0 | 3 |
| 3 | (Greece) Theodoros Maniateas | 0 | 0 | 0 | 1 | 1 |
| Totals | | 15 | 1 | 0 | 3 | 19 |

=== Disciplinary record ===
As of 29 May 1968

| N | P | Nat. | Name | Alpha Ethniki | | | Greek Cup | | | European Cup Winners' Cup | | | Balkans Cup | | | Total | | | Notes |
| N | P | Nat. | Name | Yellow card | Second yellow card | Red card | Yellow card | Second yellow card | Red card | Yellow card | Second yellow card | Red card | Yellow card | Second yellow card | Red card | Yellow card | Second yellow card | Red card | Notes |
Goalkeepers
| — | GK | (Kingdom of Greece) | Stelios Serafidis | | | | | | | | | | | | | | | | |
| — | GK | (Kingdom of Greece) | Vangelis Petrakis | | | | | | | | | | | | | | | | |
| — | GK | (Kingdom of Greece) | Theodoros Maniateas | | | | | | | | | | | | | | | | |
| — | GK | (Kingdom of Greece) | Stelios Konstantinidis | | | | | | | | | | | | | | | | |
Defenders
| — | DF | (Kingdom of Greece) | Alekos Sofianidis | | | | | | | | | | | | | | | | |
| — | DF | (Turkey) | Aleko Yordan | | | | | | | | | | | | | | | | |
| — | DF | (Kingdom of Greece) | Tasos Vasiliou | | | | | | | | | | | | | | | | |
| — | DF | (Kingdom of Greece) | Giorgos Kefalidis | | | | | | | | | | | | | | | | |
| — | DF | (Kingdom of Greece) | Fotis Balopoulos | | | | | | | | | | | | | | | | |
| — | DF | (Kingdom of Greece) | Lakis Frogoudakis | | | | | | | | | | | | | | | | |
Midfielders
| — | MF | (Kingdom of Greece) | Stelios Skevofilakas | | | | | | | | | | | | | | | | |
| — | MF | (Kingdom of Greece) | Fanis Tasinos | | | | | | | | | | | | | | | | |
| — | MF | (Kingdom of Greece) | Panagiotis Ventouris | | | | | | | | | | | | | | | | |
| — | MF | (Kingdom of Greece) | Nikos Stathopoulos | | | | | | | | | | | | | | | | |
| — | MF | (Kingdom of Greece) | Michalis Simigdalas | | | | | | | | | | | | | | | | |
| — | MF | (Kingdom of Greece) | Giorgos Karafeskos | | | | | | | | | | | | | | | | |
Forwards
| — | FW | (Kingdom of Greece) | Andreas Stamatiadis | | | | | | | | | | | | | | | | |
| — | FW | (Kingdom of Greece) | Vasilis Mastrakoulis | | | | | | | | | | | | | | | | |
| — | FW | (Kingdom of Greece) | Kostas Papageorgiou | | | | | | | | | | | | | | | | |
| — | FW | (Kingdom of Greece) | Mimis Papaioannou | | | | | | | | | | | | | | | | |
| — | FW | (Kingdom of Greece) | Spyros Pomonis | | | | | | | | | | | | | | | | |
| — | FW | (Kingdom of Greece) | Nikos Exarchidis | | | | | | | | | | | | | | | | |
| — | FW | (Kingdom of Greece) | Kostas Nikolaidis | | | | | | | | | | | | | | | | |
| — | FW | (Kingdom of Greece) | Nikos Sevastopoulos | | | | | | | | | | | | | | | | |
Left during season
| — | MF | (Kingdom of Greece) | Giorgos Petridis | | | | | | | | | | | | | | | | |

=== Starting 11 ===
This section presents the most frequently used formation along with the players with the most starts across all competitions.

| N. | Formation | Matchday(s) |
|---|---|---|
| 44 | 4–2–4 | 1–30 |

| Nat. | Player | Pos. |
|---|---|---|
| (Greece) | Stelios Serafidis | GK |
| (Greece) | Tasos Vasiliou | RCB |
| (Greece) | Fotis Balopoulos | LCB |
| (Greece) | Lakis Frogoudakis | RB |
| (Greece) | Alekos Sofianidis | LB |
| (Greece) | Giorgos Karafeskos | RCM |
| (Greece) | Stelios Skevofilakas | LCM |
| (Greece) | Andreas Stamatiadis (C) | RW |
| (Greece) | Panagiotis Ventouris | LW |
| (Greece) | Mimis Papaioannou | RCF |
| (Greece) | Kostas Nikolaidis | LCF |

Last updated: 1968-05-29

== Awards ==
| Player | Pos. | Award | Source |
|---|---|---|---|
| (Greece) Kostas Nikolaidis | FW | Greek Cup Top Scorer | |
