= Georgios Magiras =

Greek footballer and manager (1919–1994)

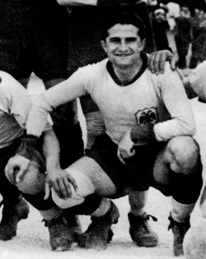
- Georgios Magiras in 1947

Personal information
- Full name: Georgios Simos
- Date of birth: 1919
- Place of birth: Urla, Smyrna, Ottoman Empire
- Date of death: 12 February 1994 (aged 74–75)
- Place of death: Greece
- Position: Midfielder

Youth career
- 1931–1933: Eleftheroupoli
- 1933–1935: AE Kalogreza
- 1935–1938: AEK Athens

Senior career*
Years	Team	Apps	(Gls)
1937–1949	AEK Athens	15	(1)
Total		15	(1)

International career
1948–1949	Greece	4	(0)

Managerial career
- 1960: Olympiacos Chalkida
- 1961: Egaleo
- 1961: Egaleo
- 1961: Greece U19
- 1965: Greece U19
- 1965–1967: AEK Athens (assistant)
- 1966: Alexander the Great
- 1966–1967: AEK Athens (interim)
- 1967–1968: Proodeftiki
- 1968: Ikaros Athens
- 1968–1969: Levadiakos
- 1969: Ikaros Athens
- 1970: Vyzas Megara
- 1972: Apollon Athens
- 1972: Pierikos
- 1972–1973: Chalkida
- * Club domestic league appearances and goals

Georgios Simos or Charalampous (Greek: Γιώργος Σίμος ή Χαραλάμπους; 1919 – 12 February 1994), commonly known as "Magiras" (Greek: Μάγειρας, which means "Cook"), was a Greek professional footballer who played as a midfielder for AEK Athens and a later manager. Throughout his career he was known by his nickname that came, due to his grandfather owining a cooking restaurant in Naxos.

== Early life ==
Magiras was born in 1919 at Urla of Smyrna. He migrated with his family at Nea Ionia of Athens in 1922, during the Asia Minor Disaster. Magiras started playing football in the academies of Eleftheroupoli in 1931 and in 1933 he joined AE Kalogreza. In 1935, he became a member of the academies and the reserve team of AEK Athens, alongside his teammates at Kalogreza, Kleanthis Maropoulos and Tryfon Tzanetis, with whom he later coexisted in the men's team.

== Club career ==
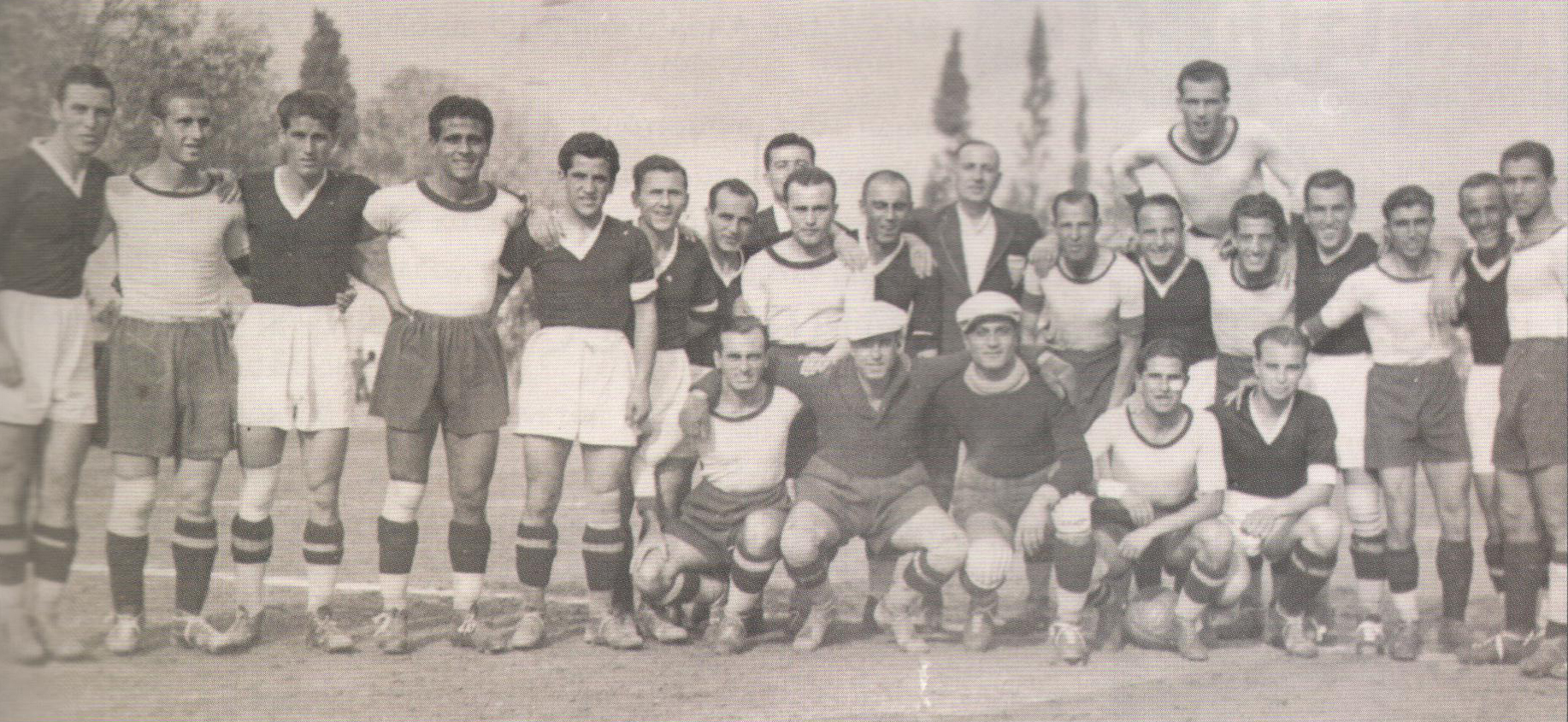
Players of AEK Athens and PAOK before the 1939 Cup final

In 1937 Magiras was promoted to the senior team and was quickly established as a regular. He was part of the squad that won the Panhellenic Championship and Greek Cup in 1939, making them the first Greek club to ever win the domestic double. The following season he won the second consecutive championship with AEK. He stayed at AEK despite the events of the World War II. In 1949 Magiras retired from football after a serious injury in the Cup final against Panathinaikos on 19 June. With the "yellow-blacks" he won two Panhellenic Championships and two Greek Cups.

== International career ==
He played a total of 4 times with Greece from 1948 to 1949. His debut came on 23 April 1948, in a friendly at home against Turkey, the first to be played after World War II, under the instructions of Kostas Negrepontis.

== Managerial career ==
After his retirement from as a footballer, Magiras became involved in coaching. He coached Olympiacos Chalkida in the first division in 1960. He also worked at Egaleo in 1961. In the 1960's he was an assistant of Lakis Petropoulos in the technical leadership of Greece.

On 22 July 1965, he returned to AEK Athens as initially as a managerial duo with Michalis Papatheodorou, but after the latter's refusal to take charge of the team, Tryfon Tzanetis was appointed a few days later instead. Thus, Tzanetis formed a managerial duo with Mageiras with the first being in charge. On 15 July 1966, it was decided by the General Sport's Secretary and AEK to support the Greek-based Alexander the Great by providing them with four of their footballers until the end of the season in order for the club to stay in the Victorian State League. Those footballers were Simigdalas, Nikolaidis, Pomonis and Papageorgiou, while Magiras went as well in order to take charge at the club's bench. Under his management and reinforced with the footballers of AEK the club avoided relegation by finishing 10th. After the end of the season in September, the footballers alognside Mageiras returned to AEK. On 20 December 1966 Tzanetis submitted his resignation from the team's bench, and after his resignation was accepted Magiras was took charge of the team, until a new manager was appointed. On 30 January 1967 Jenő Csaknády became the new manager of the club with Magiras becoming his assistant until the end of the season.

Afterwards, he continued his career at Proodeftiki. In 1968 Magiras was appointed at Ikaros Athens until 1 November and on 22 November he became the manager of Levadiakos. On 4 July 1969 he returned at the bench of Ikaros Athens. Magiras took over the bench of Vyzas Megara in 1970, where he departed after few months. In 1972, he was also the manager of Pierikos. Magiras returned to Chalcis to coach Chalkida, in 1972 for a year and led them to 4th place in the standings.

== Personal life ==
Magiras lived at Nea Ionia with his wife and two children and worked at the Water Company. He died from cancer in 12 February 1994 at the age of 75.

== Honours ==
AEK Athens

- Panhellenic Championship: 1938–39, 1939–40
- Greek Cup: 1938–39, 1948–49

== See also ==
- List of one-club men in association football
