= Tasos Vasiliou =

Greek footballer and manager (1938–2018)

- Tasos Vasiliou with AEK Athens

Personal information
- Full name: Anastasios Vasiliou
- Date of birth: 4 August 1938
- Place of birth: Nikaia, Piraeus, Greece
- Date of death: 30 September 2018 (aged 80)
- Place of death: Nikaia, Piraeus, Greece
- Position: Center back

Youth career
- –1953: Atlantida
- 1953–1956: Aris Nikaia

Senior career*
Years	Team	Apps	(Gls)
1956–1958	Aris Piraeus		
1958–1965	Apollon Athens	166	(0)
1965–1970	AEK Athens	120	(2)
1970–1973	Ionikos		
Total		286	(2)

International career
1960–1966	Greece	10	(0)
- * Club domestic league appearances and goals

Tasos Vasiliou (Greek: Τάσος Βασιλείου; 4 August 1938 – 30 September 2018) was a Greek professional footballer who played as a center back. His nickname was "the Rock" (Greek: "ο Βράχος") or "the Lion" (Greek: "το Λιοντάρι").

== Club career ==
Vasiliou started football from the streets of his neighborhood, at the club of Atlantida. In 1953 he moved to Aris Nikaia and in 1956 he signed to Aris Piraeus. In 1958 he was transferred to Apollon Athens, where he stood out with his talent and attracted the interest of the big clubs of Greece. In the summer of 1965 both AEK Athens and Olympiacos made an offer for his signing. On 31 July he was eventually transferred to AEK for a record fee at the time of 1.2 million drachmas plus Panagiotis Stasinopoulos as an exchange.

Vasiliou was quickly established as a regular for four years, while during his spell at the club he also became an international. In his first season he won a Greek Cup. The following season, under Jenő Csaknády they reached the finals of the Balkans Cup. and won the championship in 1968. He was also a member of the squad that reached the quarter-finals of the European Cup in 1969. However, his last two years at the club were not as equally good. Vasiliou originated from a "left-wing" family and asked the manager of the national team, Lakis Petropoulos to stop calling him to the representative group, as a sign of protest against the exile his father had suffered in Gyaros from the dictatorial government. Since then, the junta exerted pressure to keep the player out of the competitive activities of the club. On 11 June 1969, after a 4–2 away defeat against Panachaiki, which resulted in their elimination from the Cup, eventually found the pretext it needed to target both Vasiliou and Balopoulos because of their political beliefs. Initially, by decision of the manager Branko Stanković and the board of the club, they were punished with suspension from the club's activities until the end of the season, reportedly for deliberately underperforming in the match. Afterwards, both players remained sidelined from the club for the entire following season, mainly due to repeated conflicts with Stanković.

In the summer of 1970 Vasiliou left the club and initially signed for Vyzas Megara, but when his fellow townspeople in Nikaia found out about the deal, they pressured him to cancel the transfer and move to Ionikos, which he eventually did. He played at Ionikos until 1973, when he ended his career. Towards the end of his tenure at Ionikos, he also served as the team's manager.

== International career ==
Vasiliou played a total of 10 times with Greece, between 1960 and 1966. He made his debut on 20 November 1960 in a home match against West Germany, as part of the 1962 FIFA World Cup qualifiers, under Tryfon Tzanetis.

== After football ==
Vasiliou, after the end of his career, created a sausage production business that started in Nikaia and then created facilities based in Corinth. He died on 30 September 2018.

== Career statistics ==
=== Club ===
Appearances and goals by club, season and competition
Club	Season	League			AFCA League		Greek Cup		Continental (Note: Also includes Balkans Cup.)		Total	
Club	Season	Division	Apps	Goals	Apps	Goals	Apps	Goals	Apps	Goals	Apps	Goals
Apollon Athens	1958–59	Panhellenic Championship	0	0	6	0	5	0	0	0	11	0
Apollon Athens	1959–60	Alpha Ethniki	24	0	—		5	0	0	0	29	0
Apollon Athens	1960–61	Alpha Ethniki	26	0	—		2	0	0	0	28	0
Apollon Athens	1961–62	Alpha Ethniki	30	0	—		4	0	0	0	34	0
Apollon Athens	1962–63	Alpha Ethniki	28	0	—		1	0	0	0	29	0
Apollon Athens	1963–64	Alpha Ethniki	28	0	—		6	2	0	0	34	2
Apollon Athens	1964–65	Alpha Ethniki	30	0	—		3	0	0	0	33	0
AEK Athens	1965–66	Alpha Ethniki	29	0	—		3	0	0	0	32	0
AEK Athens	1966–67	Alpha Ethniki	30	2	—		2	0	11	0	43	2
AEK Athens	1967–68	Alpha Ethniki	33	0	—		3	0	4	0	40	0
AEK Athens	1968–69	Alpha Ethniki	28	0	—		2	0	6	0	36	0
AEK Athens	1969–70	Alpha Ethniki	0	0	—		0	0	0	0	0	0
Career total			286	2	6	0	36	2	21	0	349	4

=== International ===
Appearances and goals by national team and year
National team	Year	Apps	Goals
Greece	1960	2	0
Greece	1961	2	0
Greece	1963	2	0
Greece	1964	1	0
Greece	1965	2	0
Greece	1966	1	0
Total		10	0

== Honours ==
AEK Athens

- Alpha Ethniki: 1967–68
- Greek Cup: 1965–66
