= Aktuna =

Aktuna is a Turkish surname. Notable people with the surname include:

- Ercan Aktuna (1940–2013), Turkish footballer
- Yıldırım Aktuna (1930–2007), Turkish psychiatrist
