= 1967–68 Greek Football Cup =

1967–68 Greek Cup
Tournament details
- Country: Greece

Final positions
- Champions: Olympiacos (13th title)
- Runners-up: Panathinaikos

Tournament statistics
- Top goal scorer(s): Giorgos Sideris (7 goals)

The 1967–68 Greek Football Cup was the 26th edition of the Greek Football Cup. The competition culminated with the Greek Cup Final, held at Leoforos Alexandras Stadium, on 21 July 1968. The match was contested by Olympiacos and Panathinaikos, with Olympiacos winning by 1–0.

== Calendar ==
From the last qualifying round onwards:

Round	Date(s)	Fixtures	Clubs	New entries
Last qualifying round	21,27–29 March & 4,18 April 1968	15	49 → 33	33
Additional round	8 March 1968	1	33 → 32	none
Round of 32	16 June 1968	16	32 → 16	16
Round of 16	30 June 1968	8	16 → 8	none
Quarter-finals	7 July 1968	4	8 → 4	none
Semi-finals	14 July 1968	2	4 → 2	none
Final	21 July 1968	1	2 → 1	none

== Last qualifying round ==
Team 1	Score	Team 2
Chania	2–1	Atsalenios
Vyzas Megara	2–0 (w/o)	Aiolikos
Panserraikos	2–0	Alexandroupoli
Aris	1–0 (a.e.t.)	Thermaikos
Koropi	2–1	Ilioupoli
Veria	4–1	Pierikos
Korinthos	4–2	A.F.C. Patra
PAS Giannina	0–1 (a.e.t.)	Panetolikos
Anagennisi Giannitsa	1–2	Nikiforos Florina
Anagennisi Karditsa	2–0	Niki Volos
Diagoras	2–0	Doxa Piraeus
AEL	1–2	Chalkida
Egaleo	3–2 (a.e.t.)	Ikaros Athens
Aris Ptolemaida	3–0	Edessaikos
PAOK	2–0	Makedonikos
Atromitos	?	?

== Additional round ==
Team 1	Score	Team 2
Olympiakos Nicosia	2–1	Korinthos

• The last 16 of previous season's Cup qualified for the 2nd round.

== Knockout phase ==
In the knockout phase, teams play against each other over a single match. If the match ends up as a draw, extra time will be played. If a winner doesn't occur after the extra time the winner emerges by a flip of a coin.
The mechanism of the draws for each round is as follows:

- In the draw for the round of 32, the teams that had qualified to previous' season Round of 16 are seeded and the clubs that passed the qualification round are unseeded.
- In the draws for the round of 16 onwards, there are no seedings, and teams from the same group can be drawn against each other.

== Bracket ==
Round of 32
Koropi	0
Atromitos	1
Nikiforos Florina	0
PAOK	2
Lamia	1
Panathinaikos (a.e.t.)	2
Chalkida	2
Trikala	1
Ethnikos Piraeus	4
Egaleo	0
Aris Ptolemaida	3
Ethnikos Pylaia	0
Chania	3
OFI	2
Proodeftiki	0
Apollon Athens	2
Panachaiki	4
Panelefsiniakos	2
Iraklis	1
Xanthi	0
Anagennisi Karditsa	0
Olympiacos	2
Olympiakos Nicosia	3
Diagoras	2
Panionios	4
Panetolikos	0
Panserraikos	1
Veria	0
Aris (c)	0
Kavala	0
Vyzas Megara	1
AEK Athens (a.e.t.)	2

Round of 16
Atromitos	1
PAOK (c)	1
Panathinaikos	2
Chalkida	1
Ethnikos Piraeus	3
Aris Ptolemaida	1
Chania	2
Apollon Athens (a.e.t.)	4
Panachaiki	2
Iraklis	0
Olympiacos	4
Olympiakos Nicosia	2
Panionios	4
Panserraikos	2
Aris	0
AEK Athens	1

Quarter-finals
PAOK	1
Panathinaikos (a.e.t.)	2
Ethnikos Piraeus (a.e.t.)	3
Apollon Athens	2
Panachaiki	3
Olympiacos	8
Panionios	0
AEK Athens	1

Semi-finals
Panathinaikos	2
Ethnikos Piraeus	0
Olympiacos	2
AEK Athens	1

Final
Panathinaikos	0
Olympiacos	1

== Round of 32 ==
Team 1	Score	Team 2
Proodeftiki	0–2	Apollon Athens
Lamia	1–2 (a.e.t.)	Panathinaikos
Koropi	0–1	Atromitos
Vyzas Megara	1–2 (a.e.t.)	AEK Athens
Ethnikos Piraeus	4–0	Egaleo
Anagennisi Karditsa	0–2	Olympiacos
Panionios	4–0	Panetolikos
Panachaiki	4–2	Panelefsiniakos
Chania	3–2	OFI
Olympiakos Nicosia	3–2	Diagoras
Chalkida	2–1	Trikala
Panserraikos	1–0	Veria
Iraklis	1–0	Xanthi
Nikiforos Florina	0–2	PAOK
Aris	0–0 (a.e.t.)^{*}	Kavala
Aris Ptolemaida	3–0	Ethnikos Pylaia

^{*}Coin toss.

== Round of 16 ==
Team 1	Score	Team 2
Panachaiki	2–0	Iraklis
Panionios	4–2	Panserraikos
Olympiacos	4–2	Olympiakos Nicosia
Panathinaikos	2–1	Chalkida
Aris	0–1	AEK Athens
Ethnikos Piraeus	3–1	Aris Ptolemaida
Chania	2–4 (a.e.t.)	Apollon Athens
Atromitos	1–1 (a.e.t.)^{*}	PAOK

^{*}Coin toss.

== Quarter-finals ==
Team 1	Score	Team 2
Panionios	0–1	AEK Athens
Panachaiki	3–8	Olympiacos
PAOK	1–2 (a.e.t.)^{*}	Panathinaikos
Ethnikos Piraeus	3–2 (a.e.t.)^{**}	Apollon Athens

^{*} Suspended at 115th minute.

^{**} Suspended at 114th minute.

== Semi-finals ==
Team 1	Score	Team 2
Olympiacos	2–1	AEK Athens
Panathinaikos	2–0	Ethnikos Piraeus

== Final ==
21 July 1968
17:30 EET

Panathinaikos	0–1	Olympiacos
	Report (pages 4,5)	Vasiliou 75'

Leoforos Alexandras Stadium, Ampelokipoi
Attendance: 22,669
Referee: Aurel Bentu (Romania)
