= Vasilis Mastrakoulis =

Greek footballer (born 1939)

Personal information
- Full name: Vasilios Mastrakoulis
- Date of birth: 1939 (age 86–87)
- Place of birth: Athens, Greece
- Position: Forward

Youth career
- 1953–1956: Keravnos Patisia
- 1956–1957: Apollon Athens

Senior career*
Years	Team	Apps	(Gls)
1957–1966	Apollon Athens	80	(9)
1965–1966	→ Hellenic (loan)		
1966–1968	AEK Athens	12	(0)
Total		92	(9)

International career
1961	Greece	2	(0)
- * Club domestic league appearances and goals

Vasilis Mastrakoulis (Greek: Βασίλης Μαστρακούλης; born 1939) is a Greek former professional footballer who played as a forward.

== Club career ==
Mastrakoulis began his football career playing for a team he had created with his friends, Keravnos Patisia. When he played against the third team of Apollon Athens, he was noticed by the club's officials. He joined the youth departments of Apollon in 1956, progressing through the club's reserve teams. In 1957 the senior team was playing against Iraklis at Rizoupoli Stadium. Several players of Apollon were unavailable due to a dispute between them and the club's administration. Thus, Mastrakoulis was selected to make his debut with the senior team, replacing Giannis Cholevas on the right wing. Apollon won the match 2–1 with Mastrakoulis establishing himself in the main squad. He played primarily as a right winger and became known for his speed, dribbling ability and willingness to create chances for his teammates. In his first season at the club he won the Athens FCA League. In 1962 Mastrakoulis suffered a serious knee injury and underwent surgery in the following year. He eventually returned to action in 1964. On 24 February 1964, Mastrakoulis was sentenced to 13 months' imprisonment in a military prison for desertion, following his participation in the national team's trip to England in November 1962. He maintained that he had travelled with the assurance of the HFF officials that the necessary military leave had been arranged. On 10 March, the military court of appeal acquitted him by majority decision, ruling that he had acted under an excusable mistake of fact, as he had believed that the necessary leave had been granted. Following his acquittal, Mastrakoulis returned to training with Apollon Athens.

Following a disagreement with the president of Apollon, he received an offer to continue his career in Hellenic through their manager, Mario Tuane, who had previously managed Doxa Drama and knew Mastrakoulis. Thus in early 1965, Mastrakoulis moved to South Africa, where he spent two seasons. During this time, the official of AEK Athens, Kleanthis Maropoulos and the manager of the club, Tryfon Tzanetis negotiated with his brother, Stavros, in order for the player to join their club.

On 31 July 1966, his transfer was completed for a fee of 270,000 drachmas paid to Apollon Athens. On 16 August, Mastrakoulis returned to Greece and joined the squad, as the following day the team would depart for a pre-season preparation, participating in the New York Champions Cup, playing against Santos and Benfica. At AEK he was also reunited with his teammate at Hellenic, Panagiotis Ventouris. Mastrakoulis played as a starter at both legs against Braga for the European Cup Winners' Cup, where AEK suffered two defeats. He spent two seasons at the club, but made relatively few appearances, since he played in the same position as their captain, Andreas Stamatiadis. He was part of the squad that reached the finals of the Balkans Cup of 1967, playing in all three finals against Fenerbahçe. During his career with AEK, he won the championship in 1968. On 31 July 1968, Mastrakoulis was released from the club. He wanted to return to Apollon, but a regulation introduced by general secretary of sport, Konstantinos Aslanidis prevented a player from transferring directly between two first division clubs after the end of July. As a result, he decided to end his playing career at the age of 27.

== International career ==
Mastrakoulis represented Greece twice in 1961, both appearances coming in the qualifiers for the 1962 FIFA World Cup. He made his international debut on 17 October 1961 against Northern Ireland at Windsor Park, in a 2–0 defeat. His second and final international appearance came five days later, on 22 October, against West Germany at the Rosenaustadion, where Mastrakoulis again started the match and Greece lost 2–1. Mastrakoulis subsequently lost his place in the national team after suffering a serious knee injury in 1962, which kept him out of action for much of the year, while his military service also affected his availability. He later recalled that he had also been selected for the Greece under-23 team and travelled to Romania, but his continuing physical problems prevented him from returning to the senior national team.

== Career statistics ==
=== Club ===
Appearances and goals by club, season and competition
Club	Season	League (Note: Also includes play-off matches.)			AFCA League		Cup (Note: Includes Greek Cup, NFL Cup)		Continental (Note: Also includes Balkans Cup.)		Total	
Club	Season	Division	Apps	Goals	Apps	Goals	Apps	Goals	Apps	Goals	Apps	Goals
Apollon Athens	1957–58	Panhellenic Championship	3	0	0	0	0	0	0	0	3	0
Apollon Athens	1958–59	Panhellenic Championship	0	0	0	0	4	0	0	0	4	0
Apollon Athens	1959–60	Alpha Ethniki	20	1	—		7	1	0	0	27	2
Apollon Athens	1960–61	Alpha Ethniki	25	4	—		3	0	0	0	28	4
Apollon Athens	1961–62	Alpha Ethniki	16	3	—		0	0	0	0	16	3
Apollon Athens	1962–63	Alpha Ethniki	10	1	—		0	0	0	0	10	1
Apollon Athens	1963–64	Alpha Ethniki	5	0	—		1	0	0	0	6	0
Apollon Athens	1964–65	Alpha Ethniki	1	0	—		0	0	0	0	1	0
Hellenic (loan)	1965	National Football League	??	??	—		??	??	—		??	??
Hellenic (loan)	1966	National Football League	??	??	—		??	??	—		??	??
AEK Athens	1966–67	Alpha Ethniki	9	0	—		0	0	6	0	15	0
AEK Athens	1967–68	Alpha Ethniki	3	0	—		1	0	2	0	6	0
Career total			92	9	0	0	16	1	8	0	116	10

=== International ===
Appearances and goals by national team and year
National team	Year	Apps	Goals
Greece	1961	2	0
Total		2	0

== Honours ==
Apollon Athens

- Athens FCA League: 1957–58

AEK Athens

- Alpha Ethniki: 1967–68
