= Fotis Balopoulos =

Greek footballer (1943–2012)

- Sticker of Fotis Balopoulos with AEK Athens

Personal information
- Full name: Fotios Balopoulos
- Date of birth: 17 December 1943
- Place of birth: Korydallos, Greece
- Date of death: 3 November 2012 (aged 68)
- Place of death: Porto Rafti, Greece
- Positions: Defender; midfielder

Youth career
- 1955–1958: Enosi Korydallos
- 1958–1960: Proodeftiki

Senior career*
Years	Team	Apps	(Gls)
1960–1964	Proodeftiki		
1964–1970	AEK Athens	125	(2)
1970–1972	Vyzas Megara		
1972–1973	Atromitos	32	(0)
1974–1975	Machi Marathonas		

International career
1965–1969	Greece	10	(0)
1965	Greece military		

Managerial career
- 1978–1979: Oropos
- * Club domestic league appearances and goals

Fotis Balopoulos (Greek: Φώτης Μπαλόπουλος; 17 December 1943 – 3 November 2012) was a Greek professional footballer who played as a defender.

== Club career ==
Balopoulos started playing football in 1955, at his neighborhood club Enosi Korydallos and in 1958 he was transferred to Proodeftiki. He made his debut in 1960 in a play-off match against Iraklis. Balopoulos could compete in several positions in defense, midfield and attack. At Proodeftiki, he started playing as a striker, but later he was established as mainly a centre-back, but he was also used as a midfielder. He competed at both first and second national division and had a successful spell, attracting the interest of the Olympiacos, Panathinaikos and AEK Athens. In the summer of 1964, AEK were searching for a replacement for Giannis Marditsis and on 30 July they signed Balopoulos for a fee of 450,000 drachmas and Aris Tsachouridis as an exchange.

Balopoulos was quickly established as regular at his new club and formed a defensive duo with Tasos Vasiliou. He was member of the squad that reached the quarter-finals of the European Cup in 1969. He played for AEK for 6 seasons and won a Greek Cup in 1964 and a championship in 1968. On 11 June 1969, after a 4–2 away defeat against Panachaiki, which resulted in their elimination from the Cup, the junta regime found the pretext it needed to target Balopoulos and Vasiliou because of their left-wing political beliefs. Initially, by decision of the manager Branko Stanković and the board of the club, they were punished with suspension from the club's activities until the end of the season, reportedly for deliberately underperforming in the match. Afterwards, both players remained sidelined from the club for the entire following season, mainly due to repeated conflicts with Stanković.

On 21 October 1970, after a turbulent summer over his future at AEK Athens, he was eventually released from the club and signed for Vyzas Megara. There, he played for two years, during which he suffered several punishments and exclusions from the dictatorial regime and he even proceeded to refrain from football. On 16 August 1972 he moved to the newly-promoted Atromitos and played for one year, where they were relegated to the second division. After the end of the season, in the summer of 1973 he ended his professional career.

== International career ==
Balopoulos played a total of 10 times with the Greece, between 1965 and 1969. He made his debut on 23 May 1965 in an away match against the Soviet Union, as part of the 1966 FIFA World Cup qualifiers, under Lakis Petropoulos.

== Managerial career ==
On 8 August 1974, Balopoulos signed for the AFCA first division club, Machi Marathonas as a player-manager. In 1978 he took charge of the bench of Oropos.

== Personal life ==
His brother, Vangelis was also a footballer and they shared a common spell at Proodeftiki. He lived far from the public eye in Porto Rafti, until his death on 3 November 2012, at the age of 69.

== Honours ==
Proodeftiki

- Beta Ethniki: 1963–64

AEK Athens

- Alpha Ethniki: 1967–68
- Greek Cup: 1965–66

Greece military

- World Military Cup: 1962, 1963
