= Sakis Kouvas =

Greek footballer

Sakis Kouvas or Athanasios Kouvas or Thanasis Kouvas (Σάκης Κουβάς, Αθανάσιος Κουβάς, Θανάσης Κουβάς; born in 1946) is a Greek former footballer who played as a midfielder.

== Club career ==
Kouvas began playing football for Vyzas Megara at the age of 16. In the summer of 1971 transferred to Panathinaikos, where he competed in 1971 Intercontinental Cup. He scored 73 Greek league goals for Vyzas and Panathinaikos, making him one of the league's all-time leading goal-scorers. Kouvas won the Greek championship with Panathinaikos in 1972.

== International career ==
He made his only national appearance on 30 September 1971, for Greece.

== Honours ==
Panathinaikos

- Alpha Ethniki: 1971–72
