= Kostas Papageorgiou (footballer, born 1941) =

Greek footballer (born 1941)

Personal information
- Full name: Konstantinos Papageorgiou
- Date of birth: 1 January 1941 (age 85)
- Place of birth: Athens, Greece
- Position: Striker

Youth career
- 1956–1959: Panathinaikos

Senior career*
Years	Team	Apps	(Gls)
1958–1959	Panathinaikos		
1959–1963	Atromitos		
1963–1969	AEK Athens	82	(53)
1966	→ Alexander the Great (loan)	7	(4)
1969–1971	Apollon Athens	47	(45)
Total		136	(102)

Managerial career
- 1977: Agioi Anargyroi
- * Club domestic league appearances and goals

Kostas Papageorgiou (Greek: Κώστας Παπαγεωργίου; born 1 January 1941) is a Greek former professional footballer who played as striker.

== Club career ==
Papageorgiou started his football career in 1956, at the age of 15, when following the footsteps of his father, he enrolled in the infrastructure departments of Panathinaikos. He immediately attracted the interest of the manager, Svetislav Glišović, who recognized his potential on sight. As a member of the youth teams of the "greens" he performed excellently, playing as striker and scoring massively. After the first year of playing in the third team, he was promoted for the next two years to the reserve team and under János Zsolnai, he was promoted to the senior team. He competed in three friendly matches against Wiener, Fostiras and Egaleo, leaving excellent impressions with his performances. However, the administration of the club sidelined Papageorgiou, without giving him further opportunities to participate in matches. At the time, the 18-year-old forward was working in the morning hours and attending classes in the last class of the night eight-class then Gymnasium. In July 1959, disappointed by the treatment he received from Panathinaikos, he left the "greens" and joined Atromitos, who were competing in the Athens FCA Championship. In his first season the club won promotion to the newly formed second division. His performances attracted the interest of AEK Athens, who signed him up in the summer of 1963, for 200,000 drachmas.

With the yellow-blacks he had an active participation, but the competition for a place in the team's offense was very tough. On 1 March 1964, he scored a hat-trick in the 4–0 home win against Olympiacos Chalkida. On 4 April 1965, he scored all four goals of his team, in a 4–0 win against Athninaikos at home. Three days later, he scored in the derby against Olympiacos, where AEK won by 1–2 with a comeback, at Karaiskakis Stadium. On 13 June 1965, he scored 4 of the 5 goals in the 5–0 home win against Niki Volos. He scored a brace in a dramatic 3–3 draw against Olympiacos in Nea Filadelfeia. On 30 January 1966, he scored the winner in the final minutes in an away win against Egaleo. On 15 July 1966, it was decided by the General Sport's Secretary and AEK to support the Greek-based Alexander the Great by providing them with four of their footballers until the end of the season in order for the club to stay in the Victorian State League. Those footballers were Simigdalas, Nikolaidis, Pomonis and Papageorgiou. Papageorgiou played 7 matches and scored four times and alongside his teammates at AEK he helped the club avoid relegation by finishing 10th. After the end of the season in September, they returned to AEK. He scored the winner against FK Vardar at home for the Balkans Cup on 19 April 1967, in a season that they went undefeated, losing only in the final by Fenerbahçe. On 14 July 1968, he scored the only goal of his team shaping the final 2–1 away from home against Olympiacos, for the semi-finals of the Cup. On 18 September 1968, he scored his only goal for the UEFA competitions in a 3–0 home win against Jeunesse Esch, contributing to the club's course to the quarter-finals of the European Cup. With AEK he won the Championship of 1968, as well as two Cups. The limited number of permitted substitutions and the presence of star players in the offense did not allow him to make more participations. In 1969 as a part of renewall of Branko Stanković in the club's roster, he left AEK, a departure for which he repeatedly expressed his displeasure.

He signed for Apollon Athens, where he competed in the second division for a season, winning the league and creating a record for the division by scoring 41 league goals in a season. He played at the club until the summer of 1971, when he was released and retired as a footballer.

== Personal life ==
On 4 September 2021 Papageorgiou donated the jersey he wore on 20 June 1968 in the match against Iraklis, in the last match of Jenő Csaknády at the bench of AEK Athens, to the then under-construction History museum of AEK Athens in the Agia Sophia Stadium. He visited the museum with his son, Giannis and wore the same jersey again.

== Club statistics ==
Club	Season	League			Cup (Note: Includes Greek Cup, Australia Cup)		Continental (Note: Also includes Balkans Cup.)		Total	
Club	Season	Division	Apps	Goals	Apps	Goals	Apps	Goals	Apps	Goals
AEK Athens	1963–64	Alpha Ethniki	25	20	4	2	0	0	29	22
AEK Athens	1964–65	Alpha Ethniki	18	15	3	5	0	0	21	20
AEK Athens	1965–66	Alpha Ethniki	15	7	0	0	0	0	15	7
Alexander the Great (loan)	1966	Victorian State League	7	4	—		—		7	4
AEK Athens	1966–67	Alpha Ethniki	3	1	1	1	5	1	9	3
AEK Athens	1967–68	Alpha Ethniki	11	8	4	3	4	0	19	11
AEK Athens	1968–69	Alpha Ethniki	10	2	0	0	2	1	12	3
Apollon Athens	1969–70	Beta Ethniki	27	41	2	0	0	0	29	41
Apollon Athens	1970–71	Alpha Ethniki	20	4	4	3	0	0	24	7
Career total			136	102	18	14	11	2	165	118

== Honours ==
Atomitos

- Athens FCA Championship: 1961–62

AEK Athens

- Alpha Ethniki: 1967–68
- Greek Cup: 1963–64, 1965–66

Apollon Athens

- Beta Ethniki: 1969–70

Individual

- Beta Ethniki top scorer: 1969–70
