= Thanasis Intzoglou =

Greek footballer (1945–2020)

Personal information
- Full name: Athanasios Intzoglou
- Date of birth: 22 August 1945
- Place of birth: Nikaia, Attica, Kingdom of Greece
- Date of death: 25 July 2020 (aged 74)
- Position: Forward

Youth career
- Chalkidona

Senior career*
Years	Team	Apps	(Gls)
1962–1976	Panionios		
1974–1975	→ Toronto Homer (loan)		
1976–1978	Ethnikos Piraeus	43	(28)
1978	Toronto Panhellenic		
1978–1979	Korinthos		

International career
1969–1971	Greece	4	(0)
- * Club domestic league appearances and goals

Thanasis Intzoglou (22 August 1945 – 25 July 2020) was a Greek footballer who played as a forward.

== Club career ==
Intzoglou played at the youth level with Chalkidona. In 1962, he played in the Alpha Ethniki with Panionios, and was the league's top goal scorer for the 1967–68 season. He assisted in securing the 1971 Balkans Cup for Panionios by defeating Besa Kavajë. Throughout his tenure with Panionios he featured in the 1969–70 Inter-Cities Fairs Cup, and the 1971–72 UEFA Cup. In the summer of 1974 he played abroad in the National Soccer League with Toronto Homer, and he returned for 1975 season.

In 1976, he signed with Ethnikos Piraeus, and became the top goal scorer in the league for the second time during the 1976–77 season. He returned for the third time to play with Toronto (renamed as Toronto Panhellenic) for the 1978 summer season. He concluded his career at Korinthos in Beta Ethniki, where he assisted in securing promotion by winning the league title.

== International career ==
Intzoglou played with Greece in 1969, and made four appearances.

== Personal life ==
Intzoglou's brothers Babis and Christos were also footballers, as well as his nephew Lefteris. He died on July 25, 2020.
