= 1963–64 Alpha Ethniki =

28th season of top-tier football league in Greece

Alpha Ethniki
- Season: 1963–64
- Champions: Panathinaikos; 7th Greek title
- Relegated: Olympiacos Chalkida; Egaleo
- European Cup: Panathinaikos
- Cup Winners' Cup: AEK Athens
- Inter-Cities Fairs Cup: Aris
- Matches: 240
- Goals: 567 (2.36 per match)
- Top goalscorer: Mimis Papaioannou (29 goals)

The 1963–64 Alpha Ethniki was the 28th season of the highest football league of Greece. The season began on 14 September 1963 and ended on 14 June 1964 with the relegation play-off match. Panathinaikos won their seventh Greek title.

The point system was: Win: 3 points - Draw: 2 points - Loss: 1 point.

== Teams ==
Promoted from 1962–63 Beta Ethniki	Relegated from 1962–63 Alpha Ethniki
Olympiacos Chalkida; Doxa Drama	Proodeftiki; Fostiras

Location of teams in 1963–64 Alpha Ethniki

== League table ==
Pos	Team	Pld	W	D	L	GF	GA	GD	Pts	Qualification or relegation
1	Panathinaikos (C)	30	24	6	0	67	19	+48	84	Qualification for European Cup preliminary round
2	Olympiacos	30	20	7	3	62	17	+45	77	
3	AEK Athens	30	18	5	7	72	25	+47	71	Qualification for Cup Winners' Cup first round
4	Panionios	30	12	9	9	48	31	+17	63	
5	Apollon Athens	30	13	7	10	41	36	+5	63	
6	Aris	30	10	11	9	28	29	−1	61	Invitation for Inter-Cities Fairs Cup first round
7	Pierikos	30	9	9	12	34	42	−8	57	
8	PAOK (Note: PAOK and Egaleo were deducted 1 point each.)	30	10	7	13	22	30	−8	56	
9	Apollon Kalamarias	30	6	13	11	29	38	−9	55	
10	Ethnikos Piraeus	30	9	7	14	24	36	−12	55	
11	Doxa Drama	30	9	7	14	28	47	−19	55	
12	Iraklis	30	7	11	12	26	44	−18	55	
13	Panegialios	30	9	7	14	19	39	−20	55	
14	Niki Volos	30	8	8	14	34	43	−9	54 (Note: Relegation play-out: Niki Volos–Olympiacos Chalkida 1–1, Olympiacos Chalkida were relegated due to the worst total goal ratio.)	
15	Olympiacos Chalkida (R)	30	6	12	12	21	41	−20	54	Relegation to Beta Ethniki
16	Egaleo (R)	30	6	2	22	12	50	−38	43	Relegation to Beta Ethniki

Source: RSSSF
Rules for classification: 1st points; 2nd decision match; 3rd head-to-head goal ratio.
(C) Champions; (R) Relegated

== Results ==
Home \ Away	AEK	APA	APK	ARIS	DOX	EGA	ETH	IRA	NIK	OLY	OLC	PAO	PNE	PAN	PAOK	PIE
AEK Athens		4–0	2–0	3–0	2–0	3–0	4–0	4–0	6–0	0–2	4–0	0–1	4–0	4–2	3–1	5–0
Apollon Athens	0–3		1–1	0–0	3–0	0–1	1–0	1–0	1–0	0–1	4–0	1–2	2–0	3–1	2–1	1–1
Apollon Kalamarias	0–0	2–2		0–0	2–1	5–0	0–0	0–1	1–0	0–1	1–1	1–3	1–3	0–2	0–3	1–0
Aris	2–0	3–1	3–3		1–0	1–0	1–1	0–0	0–2	0–0	5–0	0–1	2–1	2–1	0–0	1–0
Doxa Drama	2–1	4–1	1–2	1–0		0–0	1–0	2–0	2–2	1–1	0–0	1–1	0–0	2–2	1–0	3–2
Egaleo	0–3	1–6	0–2	0–1	0–2 (Note: Egaleo-Doxa Drama 1–0, replayed 0–2.)		2–1	1–0	1–0	0–1	0–0	0–3	1–0	1–2	0–1	0–2
Ethnikos Piraeus	2–4	0–1	2–0	4–1	1–0	1–0		0–0	1–3	0–1	2–0	0–2	0–1	1–1	1–0	0–0
Iraklis	0–0	1–4	0–0	1–1	3–0	2–0	1–1		3–2	1–1	2–1	0–3	2–0	0–0	2–2	0–0
Niki Volos	2–2	0–0	2–2	3–0	3–0	1–2	3–0	1–2		1–4	0–0	1–1	0–0	2–2	1–0	2–1
Olympiacos	3–0	4–1	1–1	2–0	3–0	1–0	1–0	8–2	4–0		3–1	0–1	2–0	1–2	2–0 (Note: Olympiacos–PAOK 1–0, forfeit 2–0.)	5–0
Olympiacos Chalkida	0–4	0–0	1–1	2–2	1–0	1–0	1–2	1–0	2–1	0–2		1–1	3–0	1–1	0–0	1–0
Panathinaikos	5–4	3–1	4–2	1–0	2–0	5–1	1–0	1–1	2–0	1–1	2–1		3–0	3–0	4–0	2–1
Panegialios	1–1	2–0	1–0	0–0	0–2	1–0	0–1	3–1	0–1	2–5	1–0	1–1		1–0	1–0	0–0
Panionios	0–1	0–1	2–0	1–0	7–1	2–0	1–1	3–0	2–1	0–0	0–0	1–2	4–0		5–1	3–0
PAOK	1–0	0–2	0–0	0–1	2–0	1–0	1–2	1–0	1–0	0–0	2–1	0–1	0–0	1–1		2–0
Pierikos	1–1	1–1	1–1	1–1	5–1	2–1	4–0	3–1	1–0	3–2	1–1	0–5	3–0	1–0	0–1	

Source: RSSSF
Legend: Blue = home team win; Yellow = draw; Red = away team win.

== Top scorers ==
Rank	Player	Club	Goals
1	(Greece) Mimis Papaioannou	AEK Athens	29
2	(Greece) Giorgos Sideris	Olympiacos	26
3	(Greece) Kostas Papageorgiou	AEK Athens	20
4	(Greece) Vangelis Panakis	Panathinaikos	16
5	(Greece) Stefanos Demiris	Aris	12
5	(Greece) Takis Taktikos	Apollon Athens	12

== Attendances ==
Olympiacos drew the highest average home attendance in the 1963–64 Alpha Ethniki.

#	Team	Average attendance
1	Olympiacos	21,806
2	Panathinaikos	19,135
3	AEK Athens	15,402
4	PAOK	7,804
5	Aris	6,965
6	Ethnikos Piraeus	5,533
7	Apollon Athens	4,715
8	Iraklis	4,550
9	Panionios	4,212
10	Egaleo	3,990
11	Apollon Kalamarias	3,970
12	Doxa Drama	3,732
13	Pierikos	3,185
14	Niki Volos	3,167
15	Chalkida	2,673
16	Panegialios	2,509
