= Petros Leventakos =

Greek footballer (1945–2021)

Petros Leventakos (Greek: Πέτρος Λεβεντάκος; 23 October 1945 – 29 June 2021) was a Greek footballer who played as an attacking midfielder.

== Career ==
He started his career in Panachaiki before being transferred to Ethnikos Piraeus in the 1965–66 season. He played in Piraeus until the early seventies, when he went back to Panachaiki and was a major contributor to the team's great success.

Petros Leventakos made 101 appearances and scored 9 goals for Panachaiki and made 156 appearances and scored 25 goals for Ethnikos Piraeus in Alpha Ethniki. He also played for PAS Giannina F.C., making a total of 271 appearances in the Greek top flight during his career.
