= Kostas Nikolaidis =

Greek footballer (born 1944)

Personal information
- Full name: Konstantinos Nikolaidis
- Date of birth: 10 September 1944 (age 82)
- Place of birth: Safraboli, Athens, Greece
- Height: 1.65 m (5 ft 5 in)
- Position: Forward

Youth career
- 1958–1959: PAO Safraboli

Senior career*
Years	Team	Apps	(Gls)
1959–1965	PAO Safraboli		
1965–1973	AEK Athens	224	(94)
1966	→ Alexander the Great (loan)	7	(2)
1973–1974	PAS Giannina	41	(14)
1974–1976	Apollon Athens	56	(17)
1976–1977	Olympiakos Neon Liosion		
Total		328	(127)

International career
1962–1965	Greece U19	10	(0)
1971–1973	Greece	4	(0)

Managerial career
- 1983–1984: AEK Athens U17
- * Club domestic league appearances and goals

Kostas Nikolaidis (Greek: Κώστας Νικολαΐδης; born 10 September 1944) is a former Greek professional footballer who played as a striker. During his presence in Greek championship he scored 100 goals, which ranks him amongst the top scorers in the history of the institution.

== Early life ==
Born in Safraboli a district of Nea Ionia in Athens, Nikolaidis had also descent from North Epirus, where his father, Ilias left in 1918 during the World War I. His love for football brought him at the door of the local PAO Safraboli's youth team, in 1958, where at the age of 14 made his first tryout in order to join the club. The tryout was unsuccessful as he was turned down by the team's manager Krassas, but a year later Nikolaidis eventually managed to join PAO Safraboli after a second tryout.

== Club career ==
=== Early career ===
Nikolaidis made his first steps in youth team of PAO Safraboli in 1959, where at the age of 15 he was established quickly in the youth departments of the club. A year later he made it to the senior team and after a successful 6-year spell, the club managed to win promotion from the local divisions of Athens to the second national division. His performances attracted the interest of AEK Athens.

=== AEK Athens ===
On 29 July 1965, after a recommendation from the assistant manager and former footballer of AEK Athens, Georgios Magiras, Nikolaidis, alongside his teammate, Angelos Platonidis were transferred to the yellow-blacks for a fee of 400,000 drachmas. He was quickly established as a regular after his performances in the friendlies and formed a prominent offensive duo with Mimis Papaioannou, which contributed the club's later success. On 19 December, in his first derby against Panathinakos at Leoforos Alexandras Stadium, he scored a brace securing a 3–2 win for AEK. On 15 July 1966, it was decided by the General Sport's Secretary and AEK to support the Greek-based Alexander the Great by providing them with four of their footballers until the end of the season in order for the club to stay in the Victorian State League. Those footballers were Simigdalas, Nikolaidis, Pomonis and Papageorgiou. Nikolaidis played 7 matches and scored twice and alongside his teammates at AEK he helped the club avoid relegation by finishing 10th. After the end of the season in September, they returned to AEK. On 20 December 1967, he scored a hat-trick in the imposing 5–0 at home over Olympiakos Nicosia. His brace against Olympiacos on 31 March 1968, secured the 2–1 home win for AEK and gave them to a high extend the title at the end of the season. He was a member of the team that reached the European Cup quarter-finals in 1969. On 29 September 1972 at Nea Filadelfeia his late goal secured AEK the victory over Internazionale with 3–2 for the European Cup. During his spell at AEK he won two league titles and one Greek Cup in

=== Later career ===
In the summer of 1973 Nikolaidis was released from AEK and signed for PAS Giannina, where he played for a season, winning the second division championship, helping the club to be promoted to the first division.

On 21 August 1974 he signed for Apollon Athens, where he played for two seasons, winning again the second division championship and playing his final season at the highest tear of Greece. Except his impressive 100 goals in total for the Greek Championship, he managed to score in eight consecutive league games being one of four players that ever achieve that alongside Giorgos Sideris, Demis Nikolaidis and Kostas Mitroglou.

On 10 August 1976, Nikolaidis joined Olympiakos Neon Liosion, where he played for a season before finishing his career as a footballer.

== International career ==
Nikolaidis played in 1962 with Greece U19, under Georgios Magiras, making 10 appearances.

Nikolaidis played with Greece four times between 1971 and 1973. He made his debut on 17 November 1971, in a friendly match against Bulgaria which ended in a 2–2 draw.

== Club statistics ==
Club	Season	League			Cup (Note: Includes Greek Cup, Australia Cup)		Continental (Note: Also includes Balkans Cup.)		Total	
Club	Season	Division	Apps	Goals	Apps	Goals	Apps	Goals	Apps	Goals
AEK Athens	1965–66	Alpha Ethniki	21	11	3	3	0	0	24	14
Alexander the Great (loan)	1966	Victorian State League	7	2	—		—		7	2
AEK Athens	1966–67	Alpha Ethniki	24	11	3	4	10	1	37	16
AEK Athens	1967–68	Alpha Ethniki	30	18	4	1	4	0	38	19
AEK Athens	1968–69	Alpha Ethniki	29	10	1	0	4	0	34	10
AEK Athens	1969–70	Alpha Ethniki	25	12	1	0	0	0	26	12
AEK Athens	1970–71	Alpha Ethniki	34	15	8	8	2	0	44	23
AEK Athens	1971–72	Alpha Ethniki	33	10	3	3	2	1	38	14
AEK Athens	1972–73	Alpha Ethniki	28	7	3	4	4	2	35	13
PAS Giannina	1973–74	Beta Ethniki	41	14	—	—	0	0	41	14
Apollon Athens	1974–75	Beta Ethniki	33	11	2	1	0	0	35	12
Apollon Athens	1975–76	Alpha Ethniki	23	6	0	0	0	0	23	6
Career total			328	127	28	24	26	4	382	155

=== International ===
Appearances and goals by national team and year
National team	Year	Apps	Goals
Greece
Greece	1971	2	0
Greece	1972	1	0
Greece	1973	1	0
Total		4	0

== Personal life ==
Nikolaidis worked at the PPC, while he was playing for AEK.

== Honours ==
AEK Athens

- Alpha Ethniki: 1967–68, 1970–71
- Greek Cup: 1965–66

PAS Giannina

- Beta Ethniki: 1973–74

Apollon Athens

- Beta Ethniki: 1974–75

Individual

- Greek Cup top scorer: 1966–67
