= Ercan Aktuna =

Turkish footballer (1940–2013)

- Ercan Aktuna

Personal information
- Full name: Ercan Aktuna
- Date of birth: June 26, 1940
- Place of birth: Turkey
- Date of death: September 20, 2013 (aged 73)
- Place of death: Istanbul, Turkey
- Position: Defender

Senior career*
Years	Team	Apps	(Gls)
1957–1965	İstanbulspor		
1965–1975	Fenerbahçe		

International career
	Turkey	29	(0)
- * Club domestic league appearances and goals

Ercan Aktuna (26 June 1940 – 20 September 2013) was a Turkish footballer who played as a defender for Fenerbahçe and İstanbulspor.

== Career ==
Aktuna started his career in 1957 at İstanbulspor, then transferred to Fenerbahçe in 1965. He won five Turkish League titles in ten years. He also played 29 times for Turkey. He ended his career with Fenerbahçe in 1975.

== Death ==
On 20 September 2013, Ercan Aktuna died in Istanbul, aged 73.
