= 1967–68 Alpha Ethniki =

32nd season of top-tier football league in Greece

Alpha Ethniki
- Season: 1967–68
- Champions: AEK Athens; 4th Greek title
- Relegated: Panelefsiniakos; Proodeftiki; Olympiakos Nicosia; Olympiacos Volos
- European Cup: AEK Athens
- Cup Winners' Cup: Olympiacos
- Inter-Cities Fairs Cup: Panathinaikos; Aris
- Matches: 306
- Goals: 787 (2.57 per match)
- Top goalscorer: Thanasis Intzoglou (24 goals)

The 1967–68 Alpha Ethniki was the 32nd season of the highest football league of Greece. The season began on 8 October 1967 and ended on 10 June 1968. AEK Athens won their fourth Greek title and their first one in five years. The season was the first of several seasons in which the Cypriot champion would play in the Alpha Ethniki the following season. Olympiakos Nicosia finished second to last and were relegated back to the Cypriot First Division.

The point system was: Win: 3 points - Draw: 2 points - Loss: 1 point.

== Teams ==
Promoted from 1966–67 Beta Ethniki	Relegated from 1966–67 Alpha Ethniki
Panelefsiniakos; Olympiacos Volos	Trikala
Promoted from 1966–67 Cypriot First Division	Trikala
Olympiakos Nicosia	Trikala

Location of teams in 1967–68 Alpha Ethniki

== League table ==
Pos	Team	Pld	W	D	L	GF	GA	GD	Pts	Qualification or relegation
1	AEK Athens (C)	34	22	6	6	68	24	+44	84	Qualification for European Cup first round
2	Olympiacos	34	21	4	9	63	32	+31	80	Qualification for Cup Winners' Cup first round
3	Panathinaikos	34	17	11	6	44	19	+25	79	Invitation for Inter-Cities Fairs Cup first round
4	Aris	34	16	9	9	61	49	+12	75	Invitation for Inter-Cities Fairs Cup first round
5	Pierikos	34	15	5	14	42	46	−4	69	
6	Ethnikos Piraeus	34	12	10	12	51	43	+8	68	
7	Vyzas Megara	34	12	10	12	45	49	−4	68	
8	Panionios	34	13	7	14	56	43	+13	67	
9	PAOK	34	13	7	14	45	40	+5	67	
10	Veria	34	13	7	14	32	39	−7	67	
11	Egaleo	34	12	8	14	47	51	−4	66	
12	Apollon Athens	34	12	8	14	35	45	−10	66	
13	Iraklis	34	11	9	14	32	38	−6	65	
14	Panserraikos (O)	34	12	6	16	33	40	−7	64	Qualification for relegation play-off
15	Panelefsiniakos (R)	34	10	10	14	31	40	−9	64	Qualification for relegation play-off
16	Proodeftiki (R)	34	10	7	17	37	52	−15	61	Relegation to Beta Ethniki
17	Olympiakos Nicosia (R)	34	6	11	17	39	76	−37	57	Moving to Cypriot First Division
18	Olympiacos Volos (R)	34	8	7	19	27	62	−35	57	Relegation to Beta Ethniki

Source: RSSSF
Rules for classification: 1st points; 2nd decision match; 3rd head-to-head goal difference.
(C) Champions; (O) Play-off winners; (R) Relegated

== Results ==
Home \ Away	AEK	APA	ARIS	EGA	ETH	IRA	OLY	OLV	OLN	PAO	PNE	PAN	PNS	PAOK	PIE	PRO	VER	VYZ
AEK Athens		2–0	1–0	3–1	2–3	2–0	2–1	5–1	5–0	2–1	0–0	1–1	4–0	2–0	2–0	3–0	2–1	6–1
Apollon Athens	0–3		1–0	0–2	0–4	1–0	0–2	3–0	3–1	1–2	2–0	2–2	3–0	0–0	2–1	3–1	1–2	3–1
Aris	1–1	0–0		3–2	4–2	1–0	4–2	4–2	4–0	2–1	1–1	5–1	1–0	2–2	1–0	2–0	1–0	3–2
Egaleo	1–1	1–0	3–3		1–2	5–1	1–2	4–0	2–2	0–0	2–0	4–3	2–1	1–0	2–1	1–0	1–2	2–2
Ethnikos Piraeus	1–3	1–1	3–3	1–2		3–0	2–2	5–2	4–0	0–0	0–1	2–1	0–0	1–1	3–0	1–0	3–0	1–1
Iraklis	0–2	0–1	1–0	0–0	2–1		2–0	2–0	0–0	0–0	4–0	3–2	1–0	2–0	3–2	1–2	3–1	2–0
Olympiacos	1–4	4–0	2–1	4–1	5–0	2–0		4–0	1–0	1–0	2–0	4–3	4–0	0–1	2–0	2–0	4–0	1–0
Olympiacos Volos	1–0	1–1	2–4	1–0	1–0	0–0	1–1		0–0	0–2	4–1	0–2	1–0	0–1	1–1	1–0	1–0	1–0
Olympiakos Nicosia	1–1	3–1	3–3	1–1	2–2	1–1	1–2	2–1		1–2	1–1	2–5	2–1	0–0	5–3	3–2	1–5	0–2
Panathinaikos	1–1	2–0	5–0	1–0	0–0	2–1	1–0	1–0	3–0		1–0	1–1	0–1	1–0	3–0	0–0	1–0	5–1
Panelefsiniakos	0–1	0–0	0–1	3–1	2–0	1–0	0–2	0–0	2–3	1–3		1–0	1–0	3–2	1–1	4–1	2–0	1–1
Panionios	1–2	1–2	3–0	1–2	0–1	1–1	0–0	3–0	5–0	1–1	1–0		0–1	3–2	3–0	5–0	1–0	1–0
Panserraikos	1–0	3–0	2–2	2–0	1–0	0–0	1–1	3–0	2–1	1–1	1–2	0–2		1–2	1–0	1–0	3–0	2–0
PAOK	1–2	1–1	2–3	2–0	1–1	2–0	1–0	3–2	3–0	2–1	1–0	0–1	3–0		0–1	3–1	1–2	4–1
Pierikos	1–0	2–0	1–0	1–0	2–1	3–0	1–2	1–1	1–1	1–0	1–1	3–1	2–1	2–1		4–1	2–0	3–2
Proodeftiki	0–2	1–0	2–1	6–1	0–3	1–1	0–1	3–0	2–1	0–1	2–1	1–1	0–0	3–2	2–0		0–0	3–0
Veria	1–0	1–2	2–1	0–0	1–0	2–1	2–1	3–1	1–0	0–0	0–0	1–0	3–2	0–0	0–1	2–2		0–0
Vyzas Megara	2–1	1–1	0–0	2–1	2–0	0–0	3–1	3–1	5–1	1–1	1–1	1–0	2–1	3–1	3–0	1–1	1–0	

Source: RSSSF
Legend: Blue = home team win; Yellow = draw; Red = away team win.

Relegation play-offs
Team 1	Agg.	Team 2	1st leg	2nd leg
Panelefsiniakos	2–4	OFI	2–1	0–3
Kavala	0–2	Panserraikos	0–0	0–2

== Top scorers ==
Rank	Player	Club	Goals
1	(Greece) Thanasis Intzoglou	Panionios	24
2	(Greece) Giorgos Sideris	Olympiacos	23
3	(Greece) Sakis Kouvas	Vyzas Megara	19
3	(Greece) Mimis Papaioannou	AEK Athens	19
5	(Greece) Kostas Nikolaidis	AEK Athens	18
6	(Greece) Vasilis Kyriakou	Apollon Athens	16
6	(Greece) Alekos Alexiadis	Aris	16

== Attendances ==
Olympiacos drew the highest average home attendance in the 1967–68 Alpha Ethniki.

#	Team	Average attendance
1	Olympiacos	21,703
2	Panathinaikos	15,976
3	AEK Athens	14,440
4	PAOK	12,167
5	Aris	10,199
6	Ethnikos Piraeus	9,486
7	Iraklis	7,397
8	Egaleo	6,165
9	Proodeftiki	6,115
10	Panionios	5,549
11	Panserraikos	4,743
12	Apollon Athens	4,534
13	Veria	4,055
14	Olympiacos Volos	3,967
15	Olympiakos Nicosia	3,657
16	Panelefsiniakos	3,479
17	Vyzas Megara	3,106
18	Pierikos	2,869
