= Jenő Csaknády =

Hungarian football manager

- Jenő Csaknády with 1. FC Nürnberg

Personal information
- Date of birth: 20 September 1924
- Place of birth: Hungary
- Date of death: 7 January 2001 (aged 76)
- Place of death: Mainaschaff, Germany

Managerial career
- Years: Team
- 1957–1959: SpVgg Fürth
- 1959–1961: 1. FC Saarbrücken
- 1961–1962: Stuttgarter Kickers
- 1962–1963: AEK Athens
- 1963–1964: 1. FC Nürnberg
- 1965–1966: 1. FC Nürnberg
- 1967–1968: AEK Athens
- 1969–1970: PAOK
- 1971: Racing Strasbourg

Jenő Csaknády (20 September 1924 – 7 January 2001) was a Hungarian football manager. Csaknády studied football at the Budapest Sports Academy for 8 semesters, while for 8 years he was the coach of the Hungarian team Czepel. He wrote a book about the art of football, alongside Márton Bukovi, which was recognized within international football circles. After the Soviet invasion of Hungary in 1956, Csaknády fled to Germany and received German citizenship.

== Managerial career ==
=== Early years ===
In 1957 he coached for two years the SpVgg Fürth which participated in the Oberliga Süd and which finished in 4th and 7th place respectively. In 1959, he was hired by 1. FC Saarbrücken, with whom he won the Oberliga Südwest in 1961. In the 1961–62 season he was on the bench of Stuttgarter Kickers who competed in the 2. Oberliga Süd.

=== AEK Athens ===
In the summer of 1962, AEK Athens hired Csaknády and in his first training session in which a crowd of 2,000 fans watched original training exercises both with and without the ball. From the beginning, the Hungarian-German coach imposed his philosophy to the players, which consisted of iron discipline, appeal to learning, mood for competition and willingness to sacrifice and work. The above were put into practice very early, when already in the first month he was at AEK he punished Nestoridis and Anastasiadis with exclusion from the team's squad to Spain, absence from training for several days and a monetary fine, because they were a few minutes late to come to the stadium ahead of a friendly match. Despite the remorse of the athletes and the relative pressure from the media and the public, Csaknády refused to lift the penalty and the administration respected his decision. He later fined Papaioannou for dribble abuse and was generally very strict in disciplinary matters. Passing on his beliefs and knowledge and having done a lot of quality and intensive work in preparation and training, AEK quickly began to show that were capable of the winning the title. After a play-off match against Panathinaikos that ended 3-3, AEK won their first championship in 23 years, due to the best goal ratio, achieving 20 wins, 7 draws and 3 losses in this championship. In the Greek Cup, AEK reached the quarter-finals. Even though Csaknády was triumphant, he was fired because he asked for a monthly leave and the AEK management considered the request excessive.

=== Return to Germany ===
In the summer of 1963, Csaknády took over the technical leadership of 1. FC Nürnberg, which participated in the newly formed Bundesliga, where they finished in 9th place in the standings. In 1964 the collaboration between the two sides ends, however, a year later, Csaknády was rehired, leading the Nuremberg team to 6th place in the Bundesliga and securing participation in the Inter-Cities Fairs Cup of the following year. In the institution of the cup, they reached the semi-finals and were eliminated in extra time by Bayern Munich.

=== Return to AEK ===
In November 1966 Csaknády left Nuremberg and on 30 January 1967 he returned to AEK. AEK continued their championship run and finished in second place, three points behind the first Olympiacos, while in the Cup they were eliminated by Panathinaikos in the quarter-finals. The following season, under Csaknády, AEK proved to be relentless, tireless with the players having great mental strength and quite strong and leading the standings after an emphatic 4–1 away victory over Olympiacos on the 9th matchday. A few months later, he triumphantly won the championship with 22 wins, 6 draws and 6 losses, while in the semi-final of the Greek Cup, AEK was eliminated, losing 2–1 to Olympiacos. In June 1968, Csaknády decided to leave the club, despite the support by the supporters and management and the effort to convince him.

=== PAOK ===
In the summer of 1969, Csaknády returned to Greece on behalf of PAOK, with a warm and massive acceptance from the supporters of the club from Thessaloniki. There he also applied the same tactics, remaining unruly in matters of discipline while working quite well with the infrastructure departments. PAOK finished fifth and reached the final of the Greek Cup, where they were defeated 1–0 by Aris and at the end of the season his contract was terminated.

=== Strasbourg ===
In February 1971, Csaknády took charge of Racing Strasbourg, who played in Ligue 2 at that time. He started with five defeats, one draw and one win and elimination from the Coupe de France. In April 1971 he was fired a few games before the end of the championship, thus ending his long career on the benches ingloriously.

== After football ==
Csaknády after he finished his coaching career, resided permanently in Frankfurt. He died on 7 January 2001 at the age of 76.

== Honours ==
AEK Athens

- Alpha Ethniki: 1962–63, 1967–68
