= Vyzas F.C. =

Vyzas Megara
- Full name: Vyzas Megara Football Club
- Nickname: Yellow-Black (Kitrinomauroi)
- Founded: 1928; 98 years ago
- Ground: Megara Stadium
- Capacity: 2,350
- Chairman: Ioanna Riga
- Manager: Georgios Archontakis
- League: West Attica FCA First Division
- 2025–26: West Attica FCA First Division, 6th
- Website: http://byzasfc.gr/
Home colours	Away colours

Vyzas F.C. (Greek: Α.Γ.Σ. Βύζας Μεγάρων) is a Greek football club based in Megara, Greece. They were founded in 1928.

== History ==
Vyzas Megara were founded in 1928 by students and named after the ancient Megara hero Byzas. In 1960, the club was promoted to Greece's Beta Ethniki, where they stayed for seven years. Vyzas were later promoted to Greece's top league, Alpha Ethniki, where it played for four years. Its best result was seventh.

Between 1970 and 1975 and between 1979 and 1983, Vyzas played in Beta Ethniki. The team played for four years in Gamma Ethniki from 1983 to 1987. After 12 years in Amateur championships and four years in Delta Ethniki, the team moved to Gamma Ethniki in the summer of 2002 which they would remain until 2011. During that season, the team finished 14th along with AEL, later in the 2009–10 season, their 2nd place was tied with Kallithea. Vyzas played with Trikala, the 2nd team of the North group to the neutral stadium of Panionios at Nea Smyrni. Vyzas were losing 1–0 till 90th minute where the Megara team had a genuine chance, which was stopped by a handball, as Megarians said, but the referee gave nothing. Trikala won the game by 2–0 and the next season took part at Beta Ethniki. In 2011, the team finished 2nd in the South Group and entered the Football League where they remain until 2013 where they finished 19th.

As a historical team Vyzas has its big rivalries with other teams such as Korinthos, Panachaiki, the Patras-based team, and Aias Salamina which is based at an island nearby Megara called Salamina. At the 2009–2010 season Vyzas and Panachaiki were the two first teams of the South Group and were fighting for the first and the promotion to Beta ethniki. They played an extremely important match very late in the season, in the crowded Megara stadium. About 3000 Megarians made a fantastic atmosphere supporting their team but finally game ended 0–0. Vyzas didn't make it to gain promotion that season.

== Stadium ==
Megara Stadium, the home ground of Vyzas is located in the centre of the city, and its capacity is 2,350. Although, from the 2012–13 season, Vyzas is playing to "Primary Stadium of Megara" which is at the west of the city and it is the main training ground of the other Megara-based team, A.O.Megaron, a very successful team in basketball and athletics.

== Honours ==
- Second Division: (2)

1964–65, 1965–66

- Third Division: (1)

1978–79

- West Attica FCA First Division: (1)

2021–22

- West Attica FCA Cup: (2)

2019–20, 2022–23

- Piraeus FCA First Division: (3)

1961–62, 1977–78, 1997–98

- Piraeus FCA Cup: (1)

2000–01

== Season to season ==
- 1957–58: Piraeus FCA Fourth Division
- 1958–59: Piraeus FCA Third Division
- 1959–60: Piraeus FCA A2 Division
- 1960–62: Piraeus FCA Premier Division and Beta Ethiniki
- 1962–66: Beta Ethniki
- 1966–70: Alpha Ethiniki
- 1970–75: Beta Ethniki
- 1975–78: Piraeus FCA Premier Division and Gamma Ethniki
- 1978–79: Gamma Ethniki
- 1979–83: Beta Ethniki
- 1983–87: Gamma Ethniki
- 1987–88: Delta Ethniki
- 1988–90: Piraeus (and West Attica) FCA Premier Division
- 1990–92: Delta Ethniki
- 1992–98: Piraeus (and West Attica) FCA Premier Division
- 1998–2002: Delta Ethniki
- 2002–11: Gamma Ethniki (Football League 2 from 2005)
- 2011–14: Football League
- 2014–16: Gamma Ethniki
- 2016–22: West Attica FCA
- 2022–24: Gamma Ethniki
- 2024–: West Attica FCA

== Former players ==
For details on former players, see Category:Vyzas F.C. players.
