= 1969 Greek Football Cup final =

1969 Greek Cup final
- Event: 1968–69 Greek Football Cup
Panathinaikos	Olympiacos
1	1
- After extra time Panathinaikos won on a toss of a coin
- Date: 9 July 1969
- Venue: Karaiskakis Stadium, Piraeus
- Referee: Christos Michas (Athens)
- Attendance: 39,000

The 1969 Greek Cup final was the 25th final of the Greek Cup. The match took place on 9 July 1969 at Karaiskakis Stadium. The contesting teams were Panathinaikos and Olympiacos for a second time in a row. It was Panathinaikos' tenth Greek Cup final and third consecutive in their 61 years of existence and Olympiacos' sixteenth Greek Cup final and second consecutive in their 44-year history. It was the only Cup final to be judged on coin toss, as at the center of the pitch with the presence of the referees and the captains of both teams, Mimis Domazos, captain of Panathinaikos chose correctly and his team was awarded the trophy. By winning the Cup, Panathinaikos also achieved the first domestic double in their history. It was the last time a coin toss was used to determine the winner, as from the following year the procedure of penalties was established.

== Venue ==
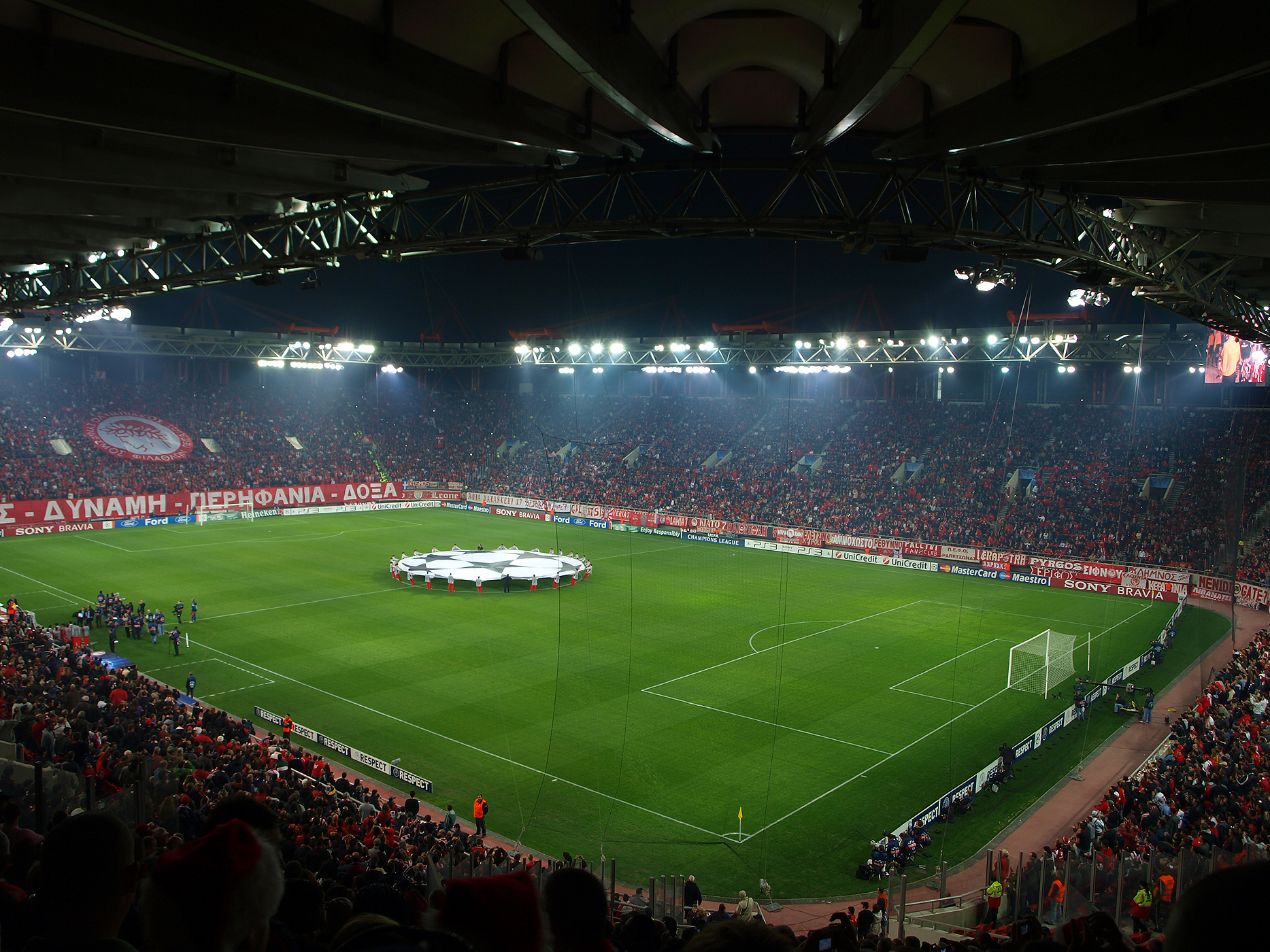
Karaiskakis Stadium.

This was the fourth Greek Cup final held at Karaiskakis Stadium, after the 1957, 1958, and 1965 finals. (Karaiskakis also hosted the replay match of the 1960 final between Panathinaikos and Olympiacos).

Karaiskakis Stadium was built in 1895 and renovated once in 1964. The stadium is used as a venue for Olympiacos and Ethnikos Piraeus and was used for Greece on various occasions. Its current capacity is 42,000.

== Background ==
Panathinaikos had reached the Greek Cup final nine times, winning four of them. The last time that they had won the Cup was in 1967 (1–0 against Panionios). The last time that had played in a final was in 1968, where they had lost to Olympiacos by 1–0.

Olympiacos had reached the Greek Cup final fifteen times, winning thirteen of them. The last time that they had won the Cup was in 1968, where they won Panathinaikos by 1–0.

The two teams had met each other in a Cup final four times in the 1960, 1962, 1965 and 1968 finals.

== Route to the final ==
Panathinaikos		Round	Olympiacos	
Opponent	Result		Opponent	Result
Asteras Zografou	3–0 (H)	Round of 32	Fostiras	4–1 (H)
Panelefsiniakos	4–2 (H)	Round of 16	Iraklis	3–2 (A)
Panachaiki	5–1 (H)	Quarter-finals	OFI	4–1 (H)
Panionios	1–0 (H)	Semi-finals	Ethnikos Piraeus	4–3 (a.e.t.) (H)

== Match ==
=== Details ===
9 July 1969
21:00 EET

Panathinaikos	1–1 (a.e.t.)	Olympiacos
Domazos 56'	Report	Sideris 49'

Karaiskakis Stadium, Piraeus
Attendance: 39,000
Referee: Christos Michas (Athens)

Panathinaikos won on a toss of a coin.

GK	(Greece) Takis Ikonomopoulos
DF	(Greece) Victor Mitropoulos	(red card) 51'
DF	(Greece) Aristidis Kamaras
DF	(Greece) Frangiskos Sourpis
DF	(Greece) Kostas Athanasopoulos
DF	(Greece) Mitsos Dimitriou
MF	(Greece) Kostas Eleftherakis
MF	(Greece) Giorgos Rokidis		(substituted off) 46'
MF	(Greece) Mimis Domazos (c)
FW	(Greece) Charis Grammos		(substituted off) 106'
FW	(Greece) Totis Filakouris
Substitutes:
DF	(Greece) Giorgos Gonios		(substituted on) 106'
FW	(Greece) Giannis Frantzis		(substituted on) 46'
Manager:
(Greece) Lakis Petropoulos

GK	(Greece) Vangelis Liadelis		(substituted off) 57'
DF	(Greece) Giannis Gaitatzis
DF	(Greece) Christos Zanteroglou
DF	(Greece) Orestis Pavlidis
MF	(Greece) Nikos Sideris
MF	(Greece) Giorgos Stolingas		(substituted off) 67'
MF	(Cyprus) Pavlos Vasiliou
MF	(Greece) Miltos Koumarias
FW	(Greece) Grigoris Aganyan
FW	(Greece) Giorgos Sideris (c)
FW	(Greece) Vasilios Botinos	(red card) 77'
Substitutes:
GK	(Greece) Takis Xarchakos		(substituted on) 57'
MF	(Greece) Panagiotis Michas		(substituted on) 67'
Manager:
(Greece) Thanasis Bebis

Assistant referees:
Giorgos Abatzoglou (Athens)
Nikos Fakis (Athens)

Match rules

- 90 minutes
- 30 minutes of extra time if necessary
- Coin toss if scores still level
- Five named substitutes
- Maximum of two substitutions

== See also ==
- 1968–69 Greek Football Cup
