= 1970–71 Panathinaikos F.C. season =

Panathinaikos
1970–71 season
- Chairman: (Greece) Michael Kitsios
- Manager: (Hungary) Ferenc Puskás
- Alpha Ethniki: 3rd
- Greek Cup: Quarter-finals
- European Cup: Runners-up
- Intercontinental Cup: Runners-up
- Top goalscorer: Mimis Domazos (20)
Home colours	Away colours	Third colours

In the 1970–71 season Panathinaikos played for the 12th consecutive time in Greece's top division, the Alpha Ethniki. They also competed in the European Cup and the Greek Cup.

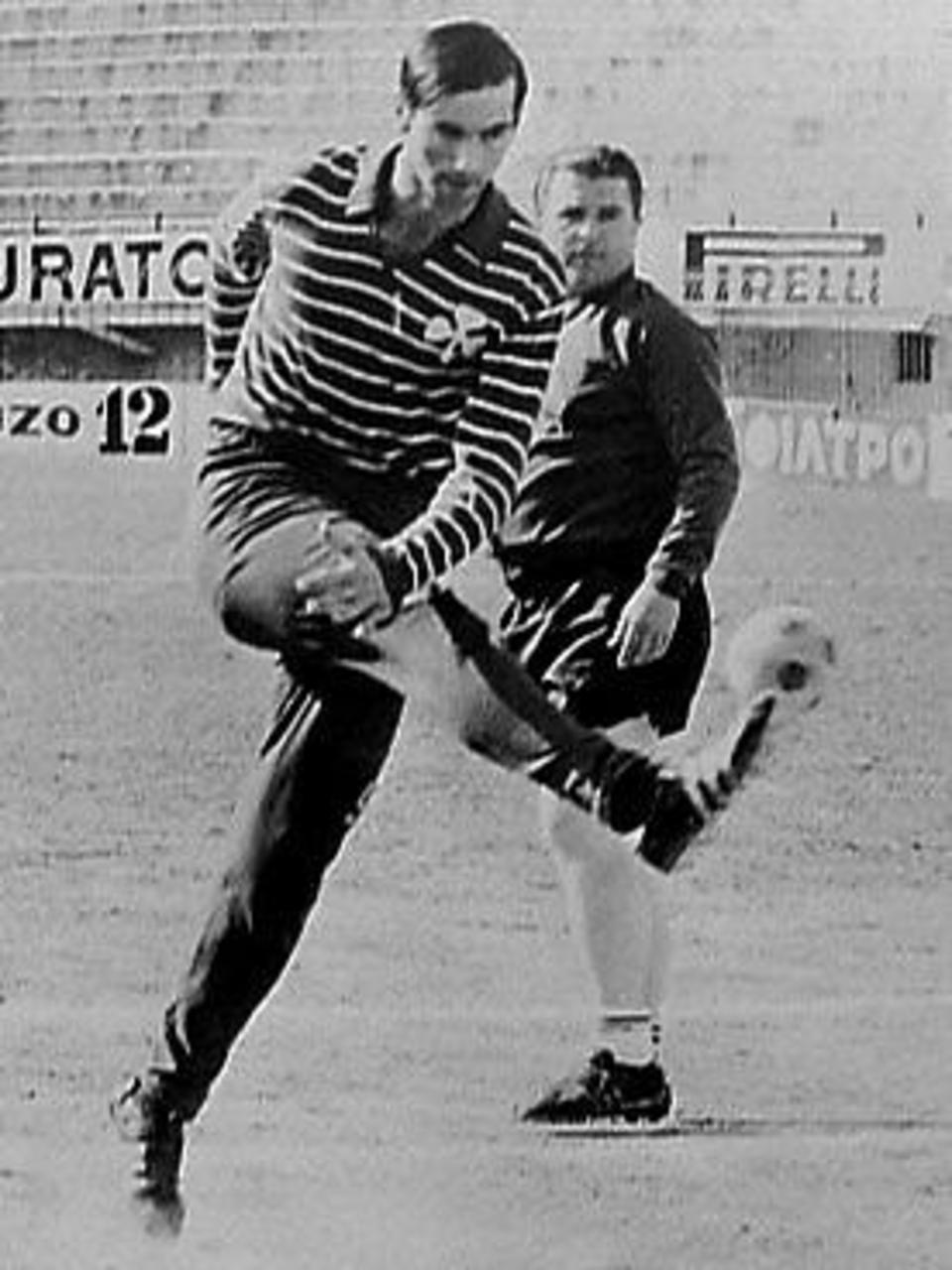
Puskás with Antonis Antoniadis (1971)

They were the runners-up in the European Cup, losing 2-0 to Ajax

== Squad ==
Note: Flags indicate national team as defined under FIFA eligibility rules; some limited exceptions apply. Players may hold more than one non-FIFA nationality.

No.	Pos.	Nation	Player
—	GK	GRE	Takis Ikonomopoulos
—	GK	GRE	Vasilis Konstantinou
—	DF	GRE	Yiannis Tomaras
—	DF	GRE	Frangiskos Sourpis
—	DF	GRE	Aristidis Kamaras
—	DF	GRE	Anthimos Kapsis
—	DF	GRE	Giorgos Vlachos
—	DF	GRE	Mitsos Dimitriou
—	DF	GRE	Victor Mitropoulos
—	DF	GRE	Kostas Athanasopoulos

No.	Pos.	Nation	Player
—	MF	GRE	Kostas Eleftherakis
—	MF	GRE	Mimis Domazos (captain)
—	MF	GRE	Charis Grammos
—	MF	GRE	Totis Filakouris
—	MF	GRE	Giorgos Deligiannis
—	FW	GRE	Antonis Antoniadis
—	FW	GRE	Dimitrios Kalligeris
—	FW	GRE	Giorgos Gonios

== Team kit ==
Home	Away	Home (2)	Away (2)

== Competitions ==
=== Alpha Ethniki ===
==== League table ====
Pos	Team	Pld	W	D	L	GF	GA	GD	Pts	Qualification or relegation
1	AEK Athens (C)	34	23	8	3	67	18	+49	88	Qualification for European Cup first round
2	Panionios	34	21	7	6	61	34	+27	83	Qualification for UEFA Cup first round
3	Panathinaikos	34	19	10	5	62	26	+36	82	
4	Egaleo	34	15	11	8	31	24	+7	75	
5	Iraklis	34	13	15	6	40	30	+10	75	

Source: RSSSF
Rules for classification: 1st points; 2nd decision match; 3rd head-to-head goal difference.
(C) Champions

=== European Cup ===
First round

Team 1	Agg.	Team 2	1st leg	2nd leg
Jeunesse Esch (Luxembourg)	1–7	(Greece) Panathinaikos	1–2	0–5

Second round

Team 1	Agg.	Team 2	1st leg	2nd leg
Panathinaikos (Greece)	4–2	(Czechoslovakia) Slovan Bratislava	3–0	1–2

Quarter-finals

Team 1	Agg.	Team 2	1st leg	2nd leg
Everton (England)	1–1 (a)	(Greece) Panathinaikos	1–1	0–0

Semi-finals

Team 1	Agg.	Team 2	1st leg	2nd leg
Red Star Belgrade (Socialist Federal Republic of Yugoslavia)	4–4 (a)	(Greece) Panathinaikos	4–1	0–3

=== Final ===
2 June 1971

Ajax (Netherlands)	2–0	(Greece) Panathinaikos
Van Dijk 5'; Haan 87'	Report Report UEFA MatchCentre

Wembley Stadium, London
Attendance: 83,179
Referee: Jack Taylor (England)

Ajax	Panathinaikos

GK	1	(Netherlands) Heinz Stuy
SW	2	(Socialist Federal Republic of Yugoslavia) Velibor Vasović (c)
DF	3	(Netherlands) Wim Suurbier
DF	4	(Netherlands) Barry Hulshoff
MF	6	(Netherlands) Nico Rijnders	(substituted off) 46'
MF	7	(Netherlands) Johan Neeskens
FW	8	(Netherlands) Sjaak Swart	(substituted off) 46'
MF	9	(Netherlands) Gerrie Mühren
FW	10	(Netherlands) Dick van Dijk
FW	11	(Netherlands) Piet Keizer
MF	14	(Netherlands) Johan Cruyff
Substitutes:
DF	12	(Germany) Horst Blankenburg	(substituted on) 46'
MF	15	(Netherlands) Arie Haan	(substituted on) 46'
GK		(Netherlands) Sies Wever
Manager:
(Netherlands) Rinus Michels

GK	1	(Greece) Takis Ikonomopoulos
DF	2	(Greece) Yiannis Tomaras
DF	3	(Greece) Giorgos Vlachos
MF	4	(Greece) Kostas Eleftherakis
MF	5	(Greece) Aristidis Kamaras
DF	6	(Greece) Frangiskos Sourpis
MF	7	(Greece) Charis Grammos
FW	8	(Greece) Totis Filakouris
FW	9	(Greece) Antonis Antoniadis
FW	10	(Greece) Mimis Domazos (c)
DF	11	(Greece) Anthimos Kapsis
Substitutes:
GK		(Greece) Vasilis Konstantinou
DF		(Greece) Victor Mitropoulos
DF		(Greece) Kostas Athanasopoulos
DF		(Greece) Mitsos Dimitriou
MF		(Greece) Dimitrios Kalligeris
Manager:
(Hungary) Ferenc Puskás

=== Intercontinental Cup ===
Panathinaikos played also for the Intercontinental Cup against Club Nacional de Football due to refusal of Ajax to participate.

First leg

==== Match details ====
15 December 1971

Panathinaikos (Greece)	1–1	(Uruguay) Nacional
Filakouris 48'	(Report)	Artime 50'

Karaiskakis Stadium, Piraeus
Attendance: 60,000 approximately
Referee: Favilli Neto (Brazil)

Panathinaikos	Club Nacional

GK	1	(Greece) Takis Ikonomopoulos
DF	2	(Greece) Yiannis Tomaras (substituted off)
DF	3	(Greece) Anthimos Kapsis
DF	4	(Greece) Frangiskos Sourpis
DF	5	(Greece) Kostas Athanasopoulos
MF	6	(Greece) Kostas Eleftherakis
MF	7	(Greece) Totis Filakouris
MF	8	(Greece) Mitsos Dimitriou
FW	9	(Greece) Antonis Antoniadis
MF	10	(Greece) Mimis Domazos
FW	11	(Greece) Sakis Kouvas
Substitutes:
DF	12	(Greece) Giorgos Vlachos	Substituted on
Manager:
(Hungary) Ferenc Puskás

GK	1	(Brazil) Manga
DF	2	(Uruguay) Juan Masnik
DF	3	(Uruguay) Ángel Brunell
DF	4	(Uruguay) Luis Ubiña
DF	5	(Uruguay) Julio Montero Castillo
MF	6	(Uruguay) Juan Carlos Blanco
MF	7	(Uruguay) Luis Cubilla
MF	8	(Uruguay) Ildo Maneiro
FW	9	(Uruguay) Víctor Espárrago (substituted off)
FW	10	(Argentina) Luis Artime
FW	11	(Uruguay) Julio Morales	Sent off (straight red)
Substitutes:
DF	12	(Uruguay) Duarte		Substituted on
Manager:
(Uruguay) Washington Etchamendi

Second leg

==== Match details ====
28 December 1971

Nacional (Uruguay)	2–1	(Greece) Panathinaikos
Artime 34', 74'	(Report)	Filakouris 89'

Estadio Centenario, Montevideo
Attendance: 63,000
Referee: Mullan (Scotland)

Club Nacional	Panathinaikos

GK	1	(Brazil) Manga
DF	2	(Uruguay) Juan Masnik
DF	3	(Uruguay) Ángel Brunell
DF	4	(Uruguay) Luis Ubiña
DF	5	(Uruguay) Julio Montero Castillo
MF	6	(Uruguay) Juan Carlos Blanco
MF	7	(Uruguay) Luis Cubilla (substituted off)
MF	8	(Uruguay) Ildo Maneiro
FW	9	(Uruguay) Víctor Espárrago
FW	10	(Argentina) Luis Artime
FW	11	(Argentina) Juan Carlos Mamelli (substituted off)
Substitutes:
DF	12	(Uruguay) Juan Martín Mujica	Substituted on
DF	13	(Uruguay) Ruben Bareño	Substituted on
Manager:
(Uruguay) Washington Etchamendi

GK	1	(Greece) Takis Ikonomopoulos
DF	2	(Greece) Victor Mitropoulos
DF	3	(Greece) Anthimos Kapsis
DF	4	(Greece) Frangiskos Sourpis
DF	5	(Greece) Kostas Athanassopoulos
DF	6	(Greece) Aristidis Kamaras (substituted off)
MF	7	(Greece) Kostas Eleftherakis
MF	8	(Greece) Mitsos Dimitriou
FW	9	(Greece) Antonis Antoniadis
MF	10	(Greece) Mimis Domazos
FW	11	(Greece) Sakis Kouvas
Substitutes:
MF	12	(Greece) Totis Filakouris	Substituted on
Manager:
(Hungary) Ferenc Puskás
