= 1968 Greek Football Cup final =

1968 Greek Cup final
- Event: 1967–68 Greek Football Cup
Panathinaikos	Olympiacos
0	1
- Date: 21 July 1968
- Venue: Leoforos Alexandras Stadium, Ampelokipoi, Athens
- Referee: Aurel Bentu (Romania)
- Attendance: 22,669

The 1968 Greek Cup final was the 24th final of the Greek Cup. The match took place on 21 July 1968 at Leoforos Alexandras Stadium. The contesting teams were Panathinaikos and Olympiacos. It was Panathinaikos' ninth Greek Cup final and second consecutive in their 60 years of existence and Olympiacos' fifteenth Greek Cup final in their 43-year history.

== Venue ==
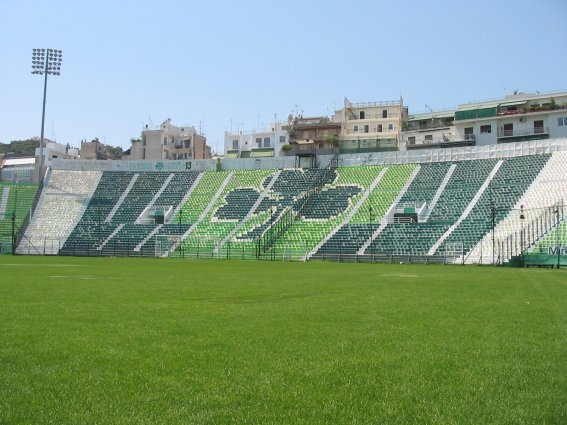
Leoforos Alexandras Stadium.

This was the eighteenth Greek Cup final held at Leoforos Alexandras Stadium, after the 1932, 1939, 1940, 1947, 1948, 1949, 1950, 1951, 1952, 1953, 1954, 1955, 1956, 1959, 1960, 1961 and 1963 finals. (Leoforos also hosted the replay match of the 1933 final between Ethnikos Piraeus and Aris, the replay match of the 1949 final between AEK Athens and Panathinaikos and the replay match of the 1952 final between Olympiacos and Panionios).

Leoforos Alexandras Stadium was built in 1922. The stadium is used as a venue for Panathinaikos and Greece. Its current capacity is 30,000.

== Background ==
Panathinaikos had reached the Greek Cup final eight times, winning four of them. The last time that they had played in a final was in 1967, where they won Panionios 1–0.

Olympiacos had reached the Greek Cup final fourteen times, winning twelve of them. The last time that they had won the Cup was in 1965 (1–0 against Panathinaikos). The last time that had played in a final was in 1966, where they had lost to AEK Athens by 2–0 without a match.

The two teams had met each other in a Cup final three times in the 1960, 1962 and 1965 finals.

== Route to the final ==
Panathinaikos		Round	Olympiacos	
Opponent	Result		Opponent	Result
Lamia	2–1 (a.e.t.) (A)	Round of 32	Anagennisi Karditsa	2–0 (A)
Chalkida	2–1 (H)	Round of 16	Olympiakos Nicosia	4–2 (H)
PAOK	2–1 (a.e.t.) (A)	Quarter-finals	Panachaiki	8–3 (A)
Ethnikos Piraeus	2–0 (H)	Semi-finals	AEK Athens	2–1 (H)

== Match ==
=== Details ===
21 July 1968
17:30 EET

Panathinaikos	0–1	Olympiacos
	Report (pages 4,5)	Vasiliou 75'

Leoforos Alexandras Stadium, Ampelokipoi
Attendance: 22,669
Referee: Aurel Bentu (Romania)

GK	(Greece) Takis Ikonomopoulos
DF	(Greece) Aristidis Kamaras
DF	(Greece) Kostas Athanasopoulos
DF	(Greece) Mitsos Dimitriou
DF	(Greece) Frangiskos Sourpis
MF	(Greece) Michalis Bellis
MF	(Greece) Zacharias Pytichoutis
MF	(Greece) Giorgos Rokidis
MF	(Greece) Mimis Domazos (c)
FW	(Greece) Stratos Sakellaridis
FW	(Greece) Totis Filakouris
Manager:
(Uruguay) Juan Hohberg

GK	(Greece) Takis Xarchakos
DF	(Greece) Giannis Gaitatzis
DF	(Greece) Orestis Pavlidis
DF	(Greece) Christos Zanteroglou
MF	(Greece) Nikos Sideris
MF	(Cyprus) Pavlos Vasiliou
MF	(Greece) Giorgos Stolingas
FW	(Greece) Grigoris Aganyan
FW	(Greece) Giorgos Sideris (c)
FW	(Greece) Nikos Gioutsos
FW	(Greece) Vasilios Botinos
Manager:
(Greece) Thanasis Kingley

Assistant referees:
Gheorghe Popovici (Romania)
Nicolae Cursaru (Romania)

Match rules

- 90 minutes
- 30 minutes of extra time if necessary
- Coin toss if scores still level

== See also ==
- 1967–68 Greek Football Cup
