= 1975 Greek Football Cup final =

1975 Greek Cup final
- Event: 1974–75 Greek Football Cup
Olympiacos	Panathinaikos
1	0
- Date: 18 June 1975
- Venue: Karaiskakis Stadium, Piraeus
- Referee: Gianfranco Menegalli (Italy)
- Attendance: 34,430

The 1975 Greek Cup final was the 31st final of the Greek Cup. The match took place on 18 June 1975 at Karaiskakis Stadium. The contesting teams were Olympiacos and Panathinaikos. It was Olympiacos' twentieth Greek Cup final and third consecutive in their 50 years of existence and Panathinaikos' twelfth Greek Cup final in their 67-year history. Notably, the FIFA president, João Havelange attended the match and also awarded the trophy to the captain of the winners. As a protest for the decision of the HFF to host the final at Karaiskakis Stadium, home ground of Olympiacos, Panathinaikos used with their reserve team in the match. It was the last time of that era that a foreign referee was appointed in a Cup final.

== Venue ==
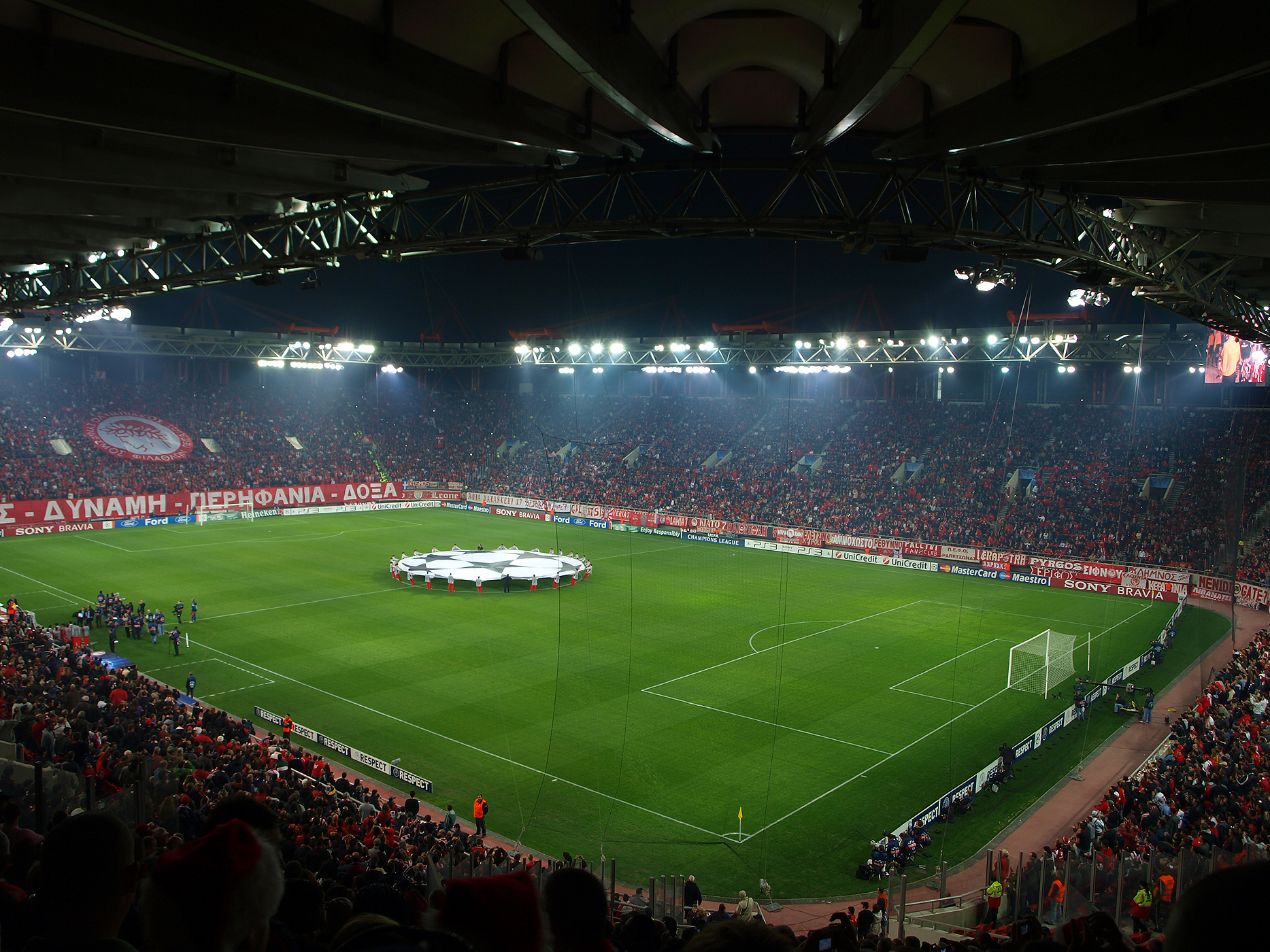
Karaiskakis Stadium.

This was the eighth Greek Cup final held at Karaiskakis Stadium, after the 1957, 1958, 1965, 1969, 1971, 1972 and 1973 finals. (Karaiskakis also hosted the replay match of the 1960 final between Panathinaikos and Olympiacos).

Karaiskakis Stadium was built in 1895 and renovated once in 1964. The stadium is used as a venue for Olympiacos and Ethnikos Piraeus and was used for Greece on various occasions. Its current capacity is 42,000 and hosted a European Cup Winners' Cup final in 1971 and the first leg of the Intercontinental Cup final in 1971.

== Background ==
Olympiacos had reached the Greek Cup final nineteen times, winning fifteen of them. The last time that they had won the Cup was in 1973 (1–0 against PAOK). The last time that had played in a final was in 1974, where they had lost to PAOK by 4–3 on penalties, which came after a 2–2 draw at the end of the extra time.

Panathinaikos had reached the Greek Cup final eleven times, winning five of them. The last time that they had won the Cup was in 1969 (They won on a toss of a coin after a 1–1 draw at the end of the extra time against Olympiacos). The last time that had played in a final was in 1972, where they had lost to PAOK by 2–1.

The two teams had met each other in a Cup final five times in the 1960, 1962, 1965, 1968 and 1969 finals.

== Route to the final ==
Olympiacos		Round	Panathinaikos	
Opponent	Result		Opponent	Result
Anagennisi Arta	7–0 (A)	Round of 32	PAS Giannina	2–0 (H)
Panachaiki	1–0 (H)	Round of 16	A.O. Karditsa	1–0 (A)
Pandramaikos	4–1 (H)	Quarter-finals	Rodos	2–0 (w/o) (A)
PAOK	4–0 (H)	Semi-finals	Iraklis	2–1 (A)

== Match ==
=== Details ===
18 June 1975

Olympiacos	1–0	Panathinaikos
Davourlis 35'	Report

Karaiskakis Stadium, Piraeus
Attendance: 34,430
Referee: Gianfranco Menegalli (Italy)

GK	(Greece) Panagiotis Kelesidis
DF	(Greece) Giannis Gaitatzis
DF	(Greece) Giannis Kyrastas
DF	(Greece) Vasilis Siokos (c)
DF	(Greece) Lakis Glezos
MF	(Austria) Peter Persidis
MF	(Greece) Takis Synetopoulos
MF	(Uruguay) Milton Viera
FW	(Greece) Michalis Kritikopoulos
FW	(Greece) Kostas Davourlis	(substituted off) 80'
FW	(Uruguay) Ignacio Peña	(substituted off) 60'
Substitutes:
MF	(Greece) Petros Karavitis	(substituted on) 80'
FW	(Uruguay) Julio Losada	(substituted on) 60'
Manager:
(Greece) Georgios Darivas

GK	(Greece) Nikos Vallianos	(substituted off) 5'
DF	(Greece) Stelios Stefanakis
DF	(Greece) Giorgos Vlachos
DF	(Greece) Dimitris Kotsos
DF	(Greece) Giorgos Gonios
MF	(Greece) Charis Grammos (c)
MF	(Greece) Spyros Livathinos
MF	(Greece) Kostas Vrettos
MF	(Greece) Totis Filakouris
FW	(Greece) Dimitris Seitaridis
FW	(Greece) Kostas Vallidis
Substitutes:
GK	(Greece) Vasilis Konstantinou	(substituted on) 5'
Manager:
(Greece) Vangelis Panakis

Assistant referees:
Artizio (Italy)
Marato (Italy)

Match rules

- 90 minutes
- 30 minutes of extra time if necessary
- Penalty shootout if scores still level
- Five named substitutes
- Maximum of two substitutions

== See also ==
- 1974–75 Greek Football Cup
