= 1977 Greek Football Cup final =

1977 Greek Cup final
- Event: 1976–77 Greek Football Cup
Panathinaikos	PAOK
2	1
- Date: 22 June 1977
- Venue: Karaiskakis Stadium, Piraeus
- Referee: Nikos Zlatanos (Thessaloniki)
- Attendance: 23,483

The 1977 Greek Cup final was the 33rd final of the Greek Cup. The match took place on 22 June 1977 at Karaiskakis Stadium. The contesting teams were Panathinaikos and PAOK. It was Panathinaikos' thirteenth Greek Cup final in their 69 years of existence and PAOK's ninth Greek Cup final in their 51-year history. In the final, the clubs faced each other at the same stadium as in 1972, where after a spectacular match Panathinaikos won by 2–1, achieved the domestic double and completed a very successful season in general since they won the Balkans Cup, as well. The footballers of PAOK, protesting the refereeing of the match, refused to receive their medals, as a result of which they received a suspension of one matchday in the following season and in fact two on each matchday so that there would be no problem with the selection of the starting line-up.

== Venue ==
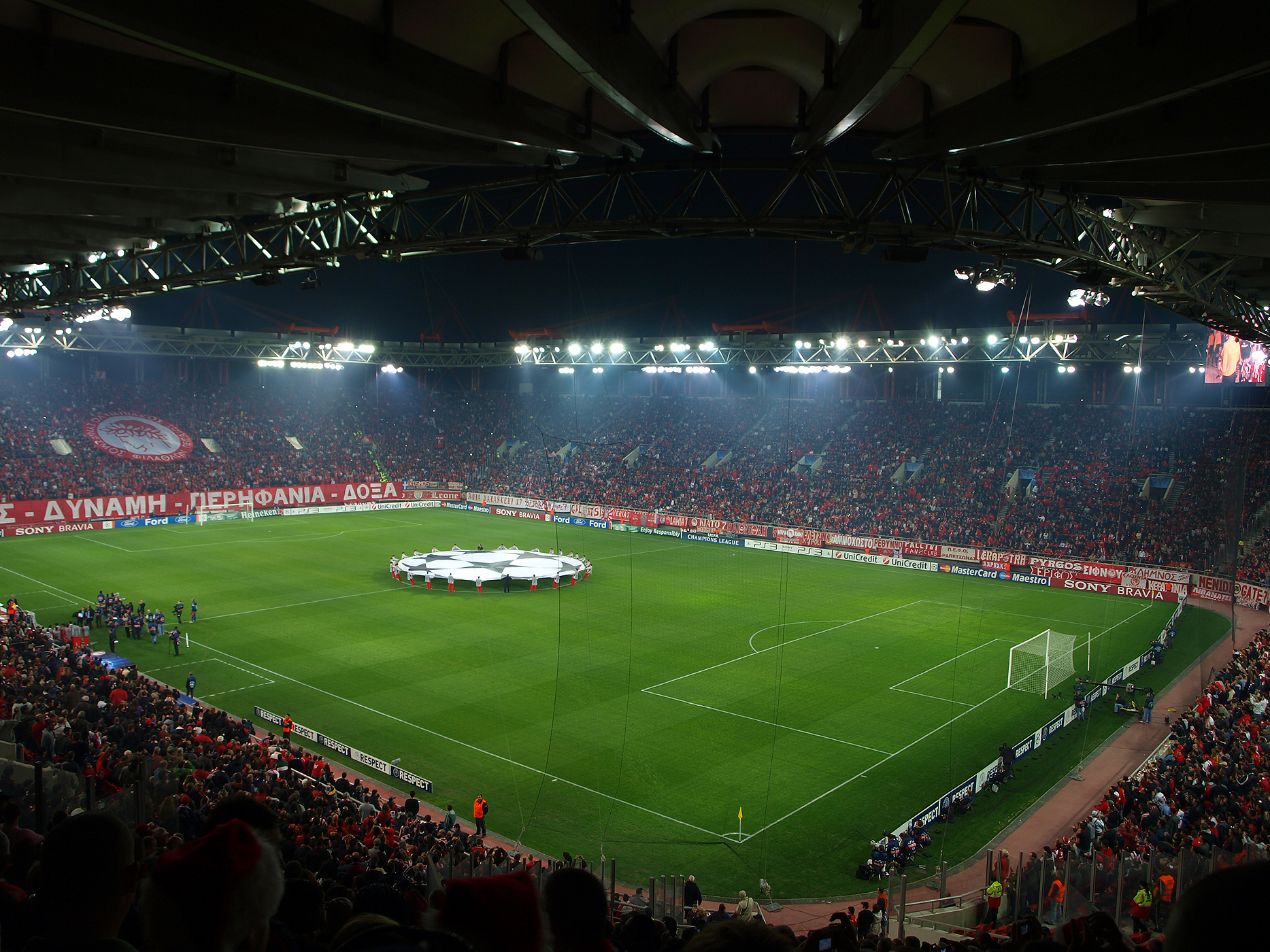
Karaiskakis Stadium.

This was the ninth Greek Cup final held at Karaiskakis Stadium, after the 1957, 1958, 1965, 1969, 1971, 1972, 1973 and 1975 finals. (Karaiskakis also hosted the replay match of the 1960 final between Panathinaikos and Olympiacos).

Karaiskakis Stadium was built in 1895 and renovated once in 1964. The stadium is used as a venue for Olympiacos and Ethnikos Piraeus and was used for Greece on various occasions. Its current capacity is 42,000 and hosted a European Cup Winners' Cup final in 1971 and the first leg of the Intercontinental Cup final in 1971.

== Background ==
Panathinaikos had reached the Greek Cup final twelve times, winning five of them. The last time that they had won the Cup was in 1969 (They won on a toss of a coin after a 1–1 draw at the end of the extra time against Olympiacos). The last time that had played in a final was in 1975, where they had lost to Olympiacos by 1–0.

PAOK had reached the Greek Cup final eight times, winning two of them. The last time that they played in a final was in 1974, where they had won Olympiacos 4–3 on penalties, which had come after a 2–2 draw at the end of the extra time.

The two teams had met each other in a Cup final two times in the 1955 and 1972 finals.

== Route to the final ==
Panathinaikos		Round	PAOK	
Opponent	Result		Opponent	Result
Kampaniakos	1–1 (3–1 p) (A)	First round	Panthrakikos	3–0 (H)
Kozani	4–0 (H)	Second round	Bye	
Trikala	4–2 (H)	Round of 16	AEK Athens	2–1 (H)
Egaleo	9–0 (H)	Quarter-finals	Ethnikos Piraeus	3–2 (A)
Olympiacos	2–1 (a.e.t.) (H)	Semi-finals	Fostiras	4–0 (H)

== Match ==
=== Details ===
22 June 1977
21:00 EEST

Panathinaikos	2–1	PAOK
Papadimitriou 29'; Vakalis 83'	Report	Terzanidis 43'

Karaiskakis Stadium, Piraeus
Attendance: 28,490
Referee: Manolis Platopoulos (Athens)

GK	(Greece) Vasilis Konstantinou
DF	(Greece) Mitsos Dimitriou
DF	(Greece) Stelios Stefanakis
DF	(Cyprus) Demetris Kizas
DF	(Greece) Anthimos Kapsis	(substituted off) 46'
MF	(Greece) Spyros Livathinos
MF	(Greece) Takis Papadimitriou
MF	(Greece) Odysseas Vakalis
MF	(Greece) Mimis Domazos (c)
FW	(Greece) Antonis Antoniadis	(substituted off) 59'
FW	(Argentina) Óscar Álvarez
Substitutes:
DF	(Greece) Takis Eleftheriadis	(substituted on) 46'
DF	(Greece) Christos Giannakoulas	(substituted on) 59'
Manager:
(Poland) Kazimierz Górski

GK
DF
DF
DF
DF
MF
MF
MF
MF
MF
FW
Substitutes:
FW
Manager:
(Northern Ireland) Billy Bingham

(Greece) Diamantis Milinis
(Greece) Giannis Gounaris	(red card) 64'
(Greece) Konstantinos Iosifidis
(Greece) Koulis Apostolidis
(Greece) Filotas Pellios
(Greece) Ioannis Damanakis
(Greece) Christos Terzanidis
(Greece) Stavros Sarafis
(Greece) Giorgos Koudas (c)
(Greece) Angelos Anastasiadis
(Brazil) Neto Guerino	(substituted off) 76'
(Greece) Konstantinos Orfanos	(substituted on) 76'

Assistant referees:
Nikos Fakis (Athens)
Ioannis Ioannidis (Thessaloniki)

Match rules

- 90 minutes
- 30 minutes of extra time if necessary
- Penalty shootout if scores still level
- Five named substitutes
- Maximum of two substitutions

== See also ==
- 1976–77 Greek Football Cup
