= 1971 Greek Football Cup final =

1971 Greek Cup final
- Event: 1970–71 Greek Football Cup
Olympiacos	PAOK
3	1
- Date: 9 June 1971
- Venue: Karaiskakis Stadium, Piraeus
- Referee: Christos Michas (Athens)
- Attendance: 38,000

The 1971 Greek Cup final was the 27th final of the Greek Cup. The match took place on 9 June 1971 at Karaiskakis Stadium. The contesting teams were Olympiacos and PAOK. It was Olympiacos' seventeenth Greek Cup final in their 46 years of existence and PAOK's fifth Greek Cup final and second consecutive in their 45-year history.

== Venue ==
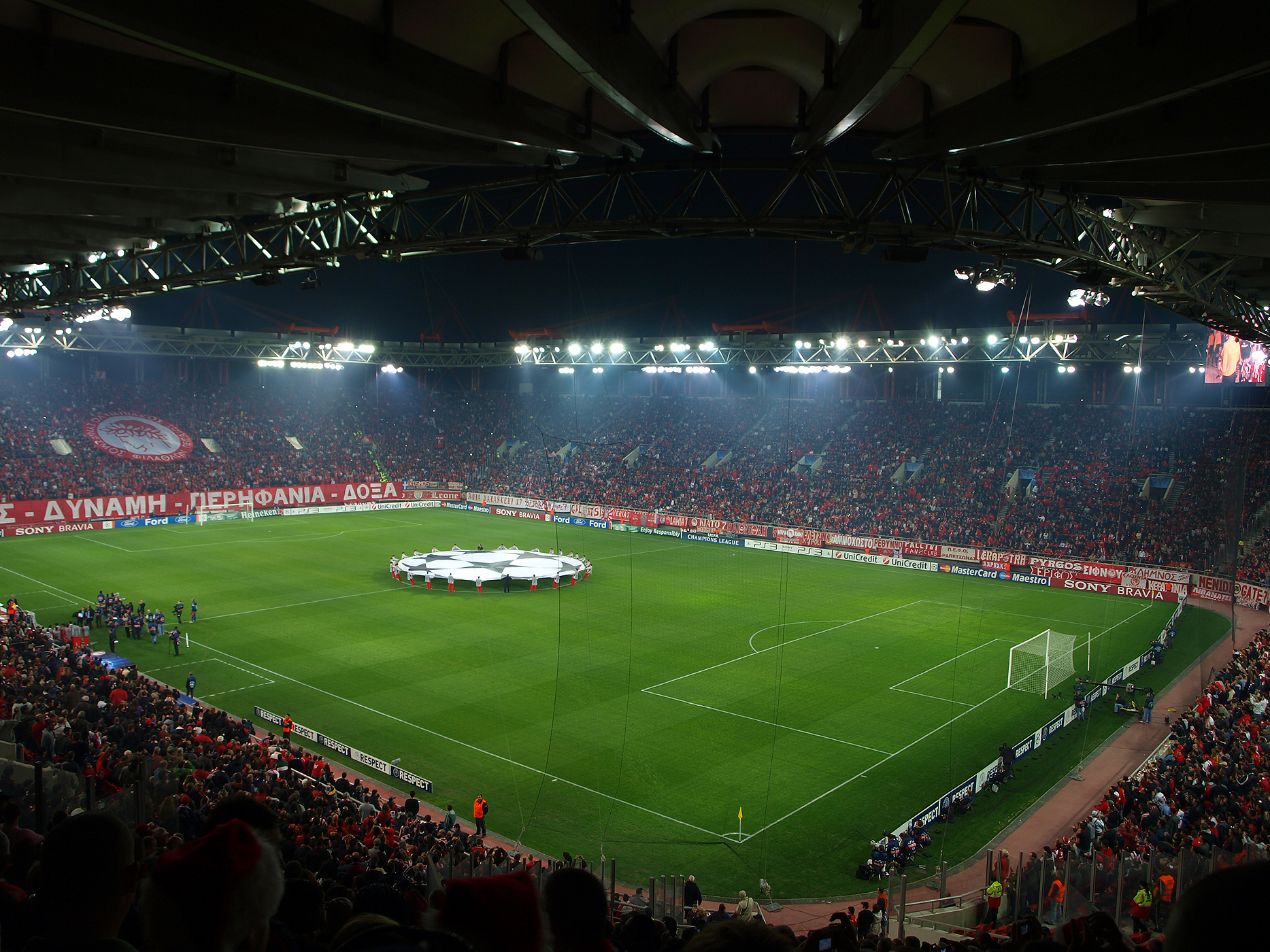
Karaiskakis Stadium.

This was the fifth Greek Cup final held at Karaiskakis Stadium, after the 1957, 1958, 1965 and 1969 finals. (Karaiskakis also hosted the replay match of the 1960 final between Panathinaikos and Olympiacos).

Karaiskakis Stadium was built in 1895 and renovated once in 1964. The stadium is used as a venue for Olympiacos and Ethnikos Piraeus and was used for Greece on various occasions. Its current capacity is 42,000 and hosted a European Cup Winners' Cup final in 1971 and will host the first leg of the 1971 Intercontinental Cup final.

== Background ==
Olympiacos had reached the Greek Cup final sixteen times, winning thirteen of them. The last time that they had won the Cup was in 1968 (1–0 against Panathinaikos). The last time that had played in a final was in 1969, where they had lost to Panathinaikos on a toss of a coin after a 1–1 draw at the end of the extra time.

PAOK had reached the Greek Cup final four times. The last time that they played in a final was in 1970, where they had lost to Aris by 1–0.

The two teams had met each other in a Cup final one time in the 1951 final.

== Route to the final ==
Olympiacos		Round	PAOK	
Opponent	Result		Opponent	Result
Pandramaikos	2–1 (A)	Round of 32	Kallithea	2–0 (A)
Chalkida	4–0 (H)	Round of 16	Trikala	6–1 (H)
Atromitos	4–1 (A)	Quarter-finals	Panathinaikos	3–2 (H)
Iraklis	2–1 (A)	Semi-finals	AEK Athens	3–2 (H)

== Match ==
=== Details ===
9 June 1971
20:30 EET

Olympiacos	3–1	PAOK
Angelis 18'; Gioutsos 43'; Pamboullis 82'	Report (page 1)	Sarafis 47'

Karaiskakis Stadium, Piraeus
Attendance: 38,000
Referee: Christos Michas (Athens)

GK	(Greece) Michalis Mylonas
DF	(Greece) Giannis Gaitatzis (c)
DF	(Greece) Thanasis Angelis
DF	(Greece) Vasilis Siokos
DF	(Greece) Kyriakos Koureas
MF	(Greece) Soulis Pappas
MF	(Greece) Petros Karavitis	(substituted off) 67'
MF	(Greece) Takis Synetopoulos
FW	(Greece) Nikos Gioutsos
FW	(Cyprus) Pamboullis Papadopoulos
FW	(Greece) Georgios Delikaris
Substitutes:
MF	(Greece) Miltos Koumarias	(substituted on) 67'
Manager:
(Greece) Georgios Darivas

GK	(Greece) Savvas Chatzioannou
DF	(Greece) Giannis Gounaris
DF	(Greece) Pavlos Papadopoulos
DF	(Greece) Giannis Chatziantoniou
DF	(Greece) Aristarchos Fountoukidis
MF	(Greece) Christos Terzanidis	(substituted off) 5'
MF	(Greece) Giannis Matzourakis	(substituted off) 46'
MF	(Greece) Stavros Sarafis
MF	(Greece) Giorgos Koudas (c)
FW	(Greece) Dimitris Paridis
FW	(Greece) Achilleas Aslanidis
Substitutes:
DF	(Greece) Michalis Bellis	(substituted on) 5'
FW	(Greece) Dimitris Stavridis	(substituted on) 46'
Manager:
(England) Les Shannon

Assistant referees:
Timoleon Latsios (Larissa)
Christos Kougias (Athens)

Match rules

- 90 minutes
- 30 minutes of extra time if necessary
- Penalty shootout if scores still level
- Five named substitutes
- Maximum of two substitutions

== See also ==
- 1970–71 Greek Football Cup
