= 1967 Greek Football Cup final =

1967 Greek Cup final
- Event: 1966–67 Greek Football Cup
Panathinaikos	Panionios
1	0
- Date: 6 July 1967
- Venue: AEK Stadium, Nea Filadelfia, Athens
- Referee: Fulvio Pieroni (Italy)
- Attendance: 28,000

The 1967 Greek Cup final was the 23rd final of the Greek Cup. The match took place on 6 July 1967 at Leoforos Alexandras Stadium. The contesting teams were Panathinaikos and Panionios. It was Panathinaikos' eighth Greek Cup final in their 59 years of existence and Panionios' third Greek Cup final in their 77-year history.

== Venue ==
This was the second Greek Cup final held at AEK Stadium, after the 1962 final.

AEK Stadium was built in 1930. The stadium is used as a venue for AEK Athens and was used for Greece on various occasions. Its current capacity is 32,000.

== Background ==
Panathinaikos had reached the Greek Cup final seven times, winning three of them. The last time that they had won the Cup was in 1955 (1–0 against PAOK). The last time that had played in a final was in 1965, where they had lost to Olympiacos by 1–0.

Panionios had reached the Greek Cup final two times. The last time that they played in a final was in 1961, where they had lost to Olympiacos by 3–0.

The two teams had never met each other in a Cup final.

== Route to the final ==
Panathinaikos		Round	Panionios	
Opponent	Result		Opponent	Result
Asteras Zografou	2–1 (H)	Round of 32	Atromitos	1–0 (H)
Ethnikos Piraeus	3–0 (H)	Round of 16	Kavala	2–0 (w/o) (H)
AEK Athens	2–1 (A)	Quarter-finals	OFI	2–2 (a.e.t.) (c) (A)
Apollon Athens	2–1 (H)	Semi-finals	Panelefsiniakos	3–0 (H)

== Match ==
=== Details ===
6 July 1967

Panathinaikos	1–0	Panionios
Grammos 56'	Report (page 4)

AEK Stadium, Nea Filadelfia
Attendance: 28,000
Referee: Fulvio Pieroni (Italy)

GK	(Greece) Takis Ikonomopoulos
DF	(Greece) Aristidis Kamaras
DF	(Greece) Frangiskos Sourpis
DF	(Greece) Michalis Bellis
MF	(Greece) Takis Loukanidis
MF	(Greece) Zacharias Pytichoutis
MF	(Greece) Mimis Domazos (c)
FW	(Greece) Totis Filakouris
FW	(Greece) Andreas Papaemmanouil
FW	(Greece) Giannis Kalaitzidis
FW	(Greece) Charis Grammos
Manager:
(Socialist Federal Republic of Yugoslavia) Stjepan Bobek

GK	(Greece) Thanasis Kourkouvelas
DF	(Greece) Kostas Karagiannopoulos
DF	(Greece) Giorgos Skrekis
DF	(Greece) Kostas Negris
DF	(Greece) Kyriakos Kazatzidis
DF	(Greece) Giannis Kyriazis
MF	(Greece) Stathis Chaitas (c)
MF	(Greece) Achilleas Athanasoulas
FW	(Greece) Thanasis Intzoglou
FW	(Greece) Giorgos Dedes
FW	(Greece) Giannis Kollias
Manager:
(Greece) Nikos Zarkadis

Match rules

- 90 minutes
- 30 minutes of extra time if necessary
- Coin toss if scores still level

== See also ==
- 1966–67 Greek Football Cup
