= 1965 Greek Football Cup final =

1965 Greek Cup final
- Event: 1964–65 Greek Football Cup
Olympiacos	Panathinaikos
1	0
- Date: 14 July 1965
- Venue: Karaiskakis Stadium, Piraeus
- Referee: Fulvio Pieroni (Italy)
- Attendance: 45,000

The 1965 Greek Cup final was the 22nd final of the Greek Cup. The match took place on 14 July 1965 at Karaiskakis Stadium. The contesting teams were Olympiacos and Panathinaikos. It was Olympiacos' fourteenth Greek Cup final in their 40 years of existence and Panathinaikos' seventh Greek Cup final in their 57-year history.

== Venue ==
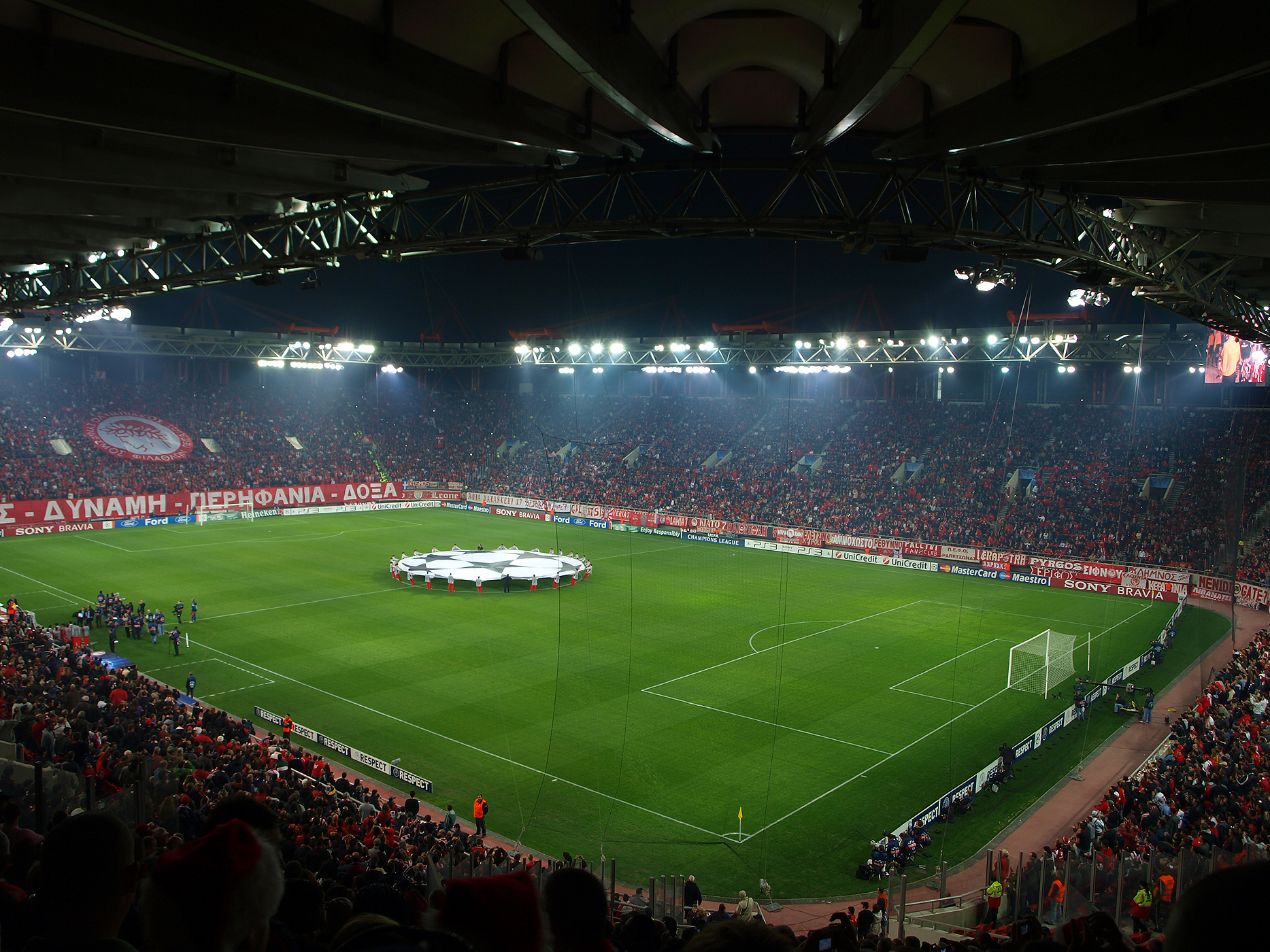
Karaiskakis Stadium.

This was the third Greek Cup final held at Karaiskakis Stadium, after the 1957 and 1958 finals. (Karaiskakis also hosted the replay match of the 1960 final between Panathinaikos and Olympiacos).

Karaiskakis Stadium was built in 1895 and renovated once in 1964. The stadium is used as a venue for Olympiacos and Ethnikos Piraeus and was used for Greece on various occasions. Its current capacity is 42,000.

== Background ==
Olympiacos had reached the Greek Cup final thirteen times, winning eleven of them. The last time that they had played in a final was in 1963, where they won Pierikos 3–0.

Panathinaikos had reached the Greek Cup final six times, winning three of them. The last time that they had won the Cup was in 1955 (1–0 against PAOK). The last time that had played in a final was in 1962, against Olympiacos, where the match was abandoned at the extra time.

The two teams had met each other in a Cup final two times in the 1960 and 1962 finals.

== Route to the final ==
Olympiacos		Round	Panathinaikos	
Opponent	Result		Opponent	Result
Olympiacos Volos	7–1 (H)	Round of 32	Lamia	5–1 (a.e.t.) (H)
Vyzas Megara	3–0 (H)	Round of 16	Apollon Kalamarias	3–0 (A)
AEK Athens	3–1 (H)	Quarter-finals	Apollon Athens	1–1 (a.e.t.) (c) (A)
Niki Volos	4–0 (H)	Semi-finals	Proodeftiki	1–0 (A)

== Match ==
=== Details ===
14 July 1965

Olympiacos	1–0	Panathinaikos
Sideris 5'	Report (page 3)

Karaiskakis Stadium, Piraeus
Attendance: 45,000
Referee: Fulvio Pieroni (Italy)

GK	(Greece) Paraschos Avgitidis
DF	(Greece) Giannis Gaitatzis
DF	(Greece) Dimitrios Stefanakos
DF	(Greece) Giannis Milisis
DF	(Greece) Kostas Polychroniou (c)
MF	(Greece) Orestis Pavlidis
MF	(Cyprus) Pavlos Vasiliou
FW	(Greece) Giorgos Sideris
FW	(Greece) Nikos Gioutsos
FW	(Greece) Aris Papazoglou
FW	(Greece) Vasilis Botinos
Manager:
(Hungary) Márton Bukovi

GK	(Greece) Takis Ikonomopoulos
DF	(Greece) Georgios Giannakopoulos
DF	(Greece) Takis Papoulidis
DF	(Greece) Aristidis Kamaras
DF	(Greece) Frangiskos Sourpis
MF	(Greece) Takis Loukanidis
MF	(Greece) Giannis Komnianidis
MF	(Greece) Stelios Panagiotidis
MF	(Greece) Giorgos Rokidis
MF	(Greece) Mimis Domazos(c)
FW	(Greece) Andreas Papaemmanouil
Manager:
(Socialist Federal Republic of Yugoslavia) Stjepan Bobek

Match rules

- 90 minutes
- 30 minutes of extra time if necessary
- Coin toss if scores still level

== See also ==
- 1964–65 Greek Football Cup
