= 1974 Greek Football Cup final =

1974 Greek Cup final
- Event: 1973–74 Greek Football Cup
PAOK	Olympiacos
2	2
- After extra time PAOK won 4–3 on penalties
- Date: 16 June 1974
- Venue: AEK Stadium, Nea Filadelfia, Athens
- Referee: Walter Hungerbühler (Switzerland)
- Attendance: 28,000

The 1974 Greek Cup final was the 30th final of the Greek Cup. The match took place on 16 June 1974 at Nikos Goumas Stadium. The contesting teams were PAOK and Olympiacos for a second time in row. It was PAOK's eighth Greek Cup final and fifth consecutive in their 48 years of existence and Olympiacos' nineteenth Greek Cup final and second consecutive in their 49-year history. It was the first time in the history of the Cup that a final reached the penalty shoot-out, where PAOK won the second Cup in their history, depriving Olympiacos the opportunity to win the domestic double.

== Venue ==
This was the third Greek Cup final held at AEK Stadium, after the 1962 and 1967 finals.

AEK Stadium was built in 1930. The stadium is used as a venue for AEK Athens and was used for Greece on various occasions. Its current capacity is 32,000.

== Background ==
PAOK had reached the Greek Cup final seven times, winning one of them. The last time that they had won the Cup was in 1972 (2–1 against Panathinaikos). The last time that had played in a final was in 1973, where they had lost to Olympiacos by 1–0.

Olympiacos had reached the Greek Cup final eighteen times, winning fifteen of them. The last time that they played in a final was in 1973, where they had won PAOK by 1–0.

The two teams had met each other in a Cup final three times in the 1951, 1971 and 1973 finals.

== Route to the final ==
PAOK		Round	Olympiacos	
Opponent	Result		Opponent	Result
Kastoria	5–0 (H)	First round	Petralona	3–0 (H)
Moudania	7–2 (H)	Round of 32	Proodeftiki	5–2 (H)
AEK Athens	3–1 (H)	Round of 16	Iraklis	3–0 (H)
Egaleo	2–0 (H)	Quarter-finals	Panionios	3–0 (H)
Pierikos	1–0 (A)	Semi-finals	Panathinaikos	1–0 (H)

== Match ==
=== Details ===
16 June 1974

PAOK	2–2 (a.e.t.)	Olympiacos
Paridis 50'; Aslanidis 72' (pen.)	Report	Triantafyllos 19'; Kritikopoulos 79'
Penalties
Sarafis (penalty scored); Paridis (penalty scored); Koudas (penalty missed); Anastasiadis (penalty scored); Apostolidis (penalty scored)	4–3	(penalty scored) Papadimitriou; (penalty missed) Poupakis; (penalty missed) Persidis; (penalty scored) Glezos; (penalty scored) Siokos

AEK Stadium, Nea Filadelfia
Attendance: 28,000
Referee: Walter Hungerbühler (Switzerland)

GK	(Greece) Ioannis Stefas
DF	(Greece) Giannis Gounaris
DF	(Greece) Konstantinos Iosifidis
DF	(Greece) Giannis Tsilingiridis
DF	(Greece) Filotas Pellios
MF	(Greece) Christos Terzanidis	(substituted off) 113'
MF	(Greece) Stavros Sarafis
MF	(Greece) Giorgos Koudas (c)
FW	(Greece) Achilleas Aslanidis	(substituted off) 95'
FW	(Greece) Dimitris Paridis
FW	(Greece) Koulis Apostolidis
Substitutes:
DF	(Greece) Aristarchos Fountoukidis	(substituted on) 113'
MF	(Greece) Angelos Anastasiadis	(substituted on) 95'
Manager:
(England) Les Shannon

GK	(Greece) Eleftherios Poupakis
DF	(Greece) Giannis Gaitatzis
DF	(Greece) Thanasis Angelis
DF	(Greece) Vasilis Siokos (c)
DF	(Greece) Lakis Glezos
DF	(Austria) Peter Persidis
MF	(Greece) Michalis Kritikopoulos
MF	(Uruguay) Milton Viera
FW	(France) Yves Triantafyllos
FW	(Greece) Georgios Delikaris
FW	(Uruguay) Julio Losada	(substituted off) 55'
Substitutes:
MF	(Greece) Petros Karavitis	(substituted on) 55'	(penalty missed) 66'	(substituted off) 105'
FW	(Greece) Giotis Papadimitriou	(substituted on) 105'
Manager:
(Greece) Lakis Petropoulos

Match rules

- 90 minutes
- 30 minutes of extra time if necessary
- Penalty shootout if scores still level
- Five named substitutes
- Maximum of two substitutions

== See also ==
- 1973–74 Greek Football Cup
