= 1973 Greek Football Cup final =

1973 Greek Cup final
- Event: 1972–73 Greek Football Cup
Olympiacos	PAOK
1	0
- Date: 17 June 1973
- Venue: Karaiskakis Stadium, Piraeus
- Referee: Vital Loraux (Belgium)
- Attendance: 40,070

The 1973 Greek Cup final was the 29th final of the Greek Cup. The match took place on 17 June 1973 at Karaiskakis Stadium. The contesting teams were Olympiacos and PAOK. It was Olympiacos' eighteenth Greek Cup final in their 48 years of existence and PAOK's seventh Greek Cup final and fourth consecutive in their 47-year history. With their conquest of the Cup, Olympiacos also achieved the conquest of their seventh domestic double.

== Venue ==
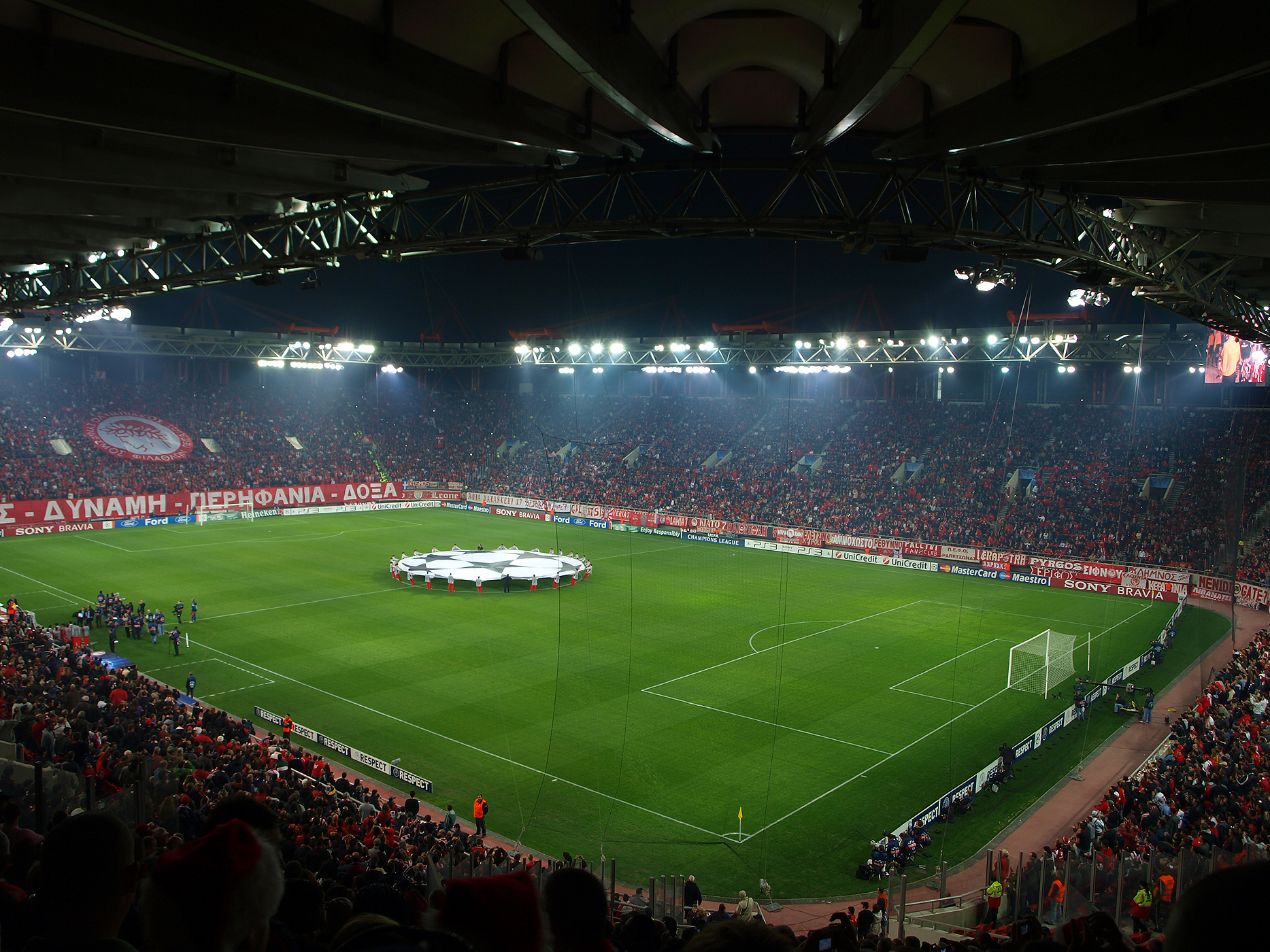
Karaiskakis Stadium.

This was the seventh Greek Cup final held at Karaiskakis Stadium, after the 1957, 1958, 1965, 1969, 1971 and 1972 finals. (Karaiskakis also hosted the replay match of the 1960 final between Panathinaikos and Olympiacos).

Karaiskakis Stadium was built in 1895 and renovated once in 1964. The stadium is used as a venue for Olympiacos and Ethnikos Piraeus and was used for Greece on various occasions. Its current capacity is 42,000 and hosted a European Cup Winners' Cup final in 1971 and the first leg of the Intercontinental Cup final in 1971.

== Background ==
Olympiacos had reached the Greek Cup final seventeen times, winning fourteen of them. The last time that they played in a final was in 1971, where they had won PAOK by 3–1.

PAOK had reached the Greek Cup final six times, winning one of them. The last time that they played in a final was in 1972, where they had won Panathinaikos by 2–1.

The two teams had met each other in a Cup final two times in the 1951 and 1971 finals.

== Route to the final ==
Olympiacos		Round	PAOK	
Opponent	Result		Opponent	Result
Koropi	5–0 (H)	First round	Anagennisi Epanomi	3–0 (A)
Rodos	3–0 (A)	Round of 32	Olympiacos Volos	5–1 (H)
PAS Giannina	1–0 (H)	Round of 16	Fostiras	2–1 (a.e.t.) (A)
Panargiakos	3–2 (H)	Quarter-finals	Panathinaikos	2–0 (H)
Panionios	2–1 (H)	Semi-finals	Ethnikos Piraeus	3–2 (a.e.t.) (H)

== Match ==
=== Details ===
17 June 1973
20:30 EET

Olympiacos	1–0	PAOK
Angelis 46'	Report

Karaiskakis Stadium, Piraeus
Attendance: 40,070
Referee: Vital Loraux (Belgium)

GK	(Greece) Panagiotis Kelesidis
DF	(Greece) Giannis Gaitatzis
DF	(Greece) Thanasis Angelis
DF	(Greece) Vasilis Siokos (c)
DF	(Greece) Lakis Glezos
DF	(Austria) Peter Persidis
MF	(Uruguay) Milton Viera	(substituted off) 90'
MF	(Greece) Georgios Delikaris	(substituted off) 89'
FW	(France) Romain Argyroudis
FW	(Greece) Nikos Gioutsos
FW	(France) Yves Triantafyllos
Substitutes:
DF	(Greece) Giorgos Vasilopoulos	(substituted on) 90'
FW	(Uruguay) Julio Losada	(substituted on) 89'
Manager:
(Greece) Lakis Petropoulos

GK	(Greece) Ioannis Stefas
DF	(Greece) Giannis Gounaris
DF	(Greece) Filotas Pellios
DF	(Greece) Konstantinos Iosifidis
DF	(Greece) Aristarchos Fountoukidis
MF	(Greece) Christos Terzanidis
MF	(Greece) Stavros Sarafis
MF	(Greece) Giorgos Koudas (c)	(substituted off) 81'
MF	(Greece) Vasilis Lazos	(substituted off) 73'
FW	(Greece) Dimitris Paridis
FW	(Greece) Koulis Apostolidis
Substitutes:
FW	(Greece) Achilleas Aslanidis	(substituted on) 73'
FW	(Greece) Dimitris Panagis	(substituted on) 81'
Manager:
(England) Les Shannon

Match rules

- 90 minutes
- 30 minutes of extra time if necessary
- Penalty shootout if scores still level
- Five named substitutes
- Maximum of two substitutions

== See also ==
- 1972–73 Greek Football Cup
