= 1971 European Cup final =

- Match programme cover
- Event: 1970–71 European Cup
Ajax	Panathinaikos
(Netherlands)	(Greece)
2	0
- Date: 2 June 1971
- Venue: Wembley Stadium, London
- Referee: Jack Taylor (England)
- Attendance: 83,179

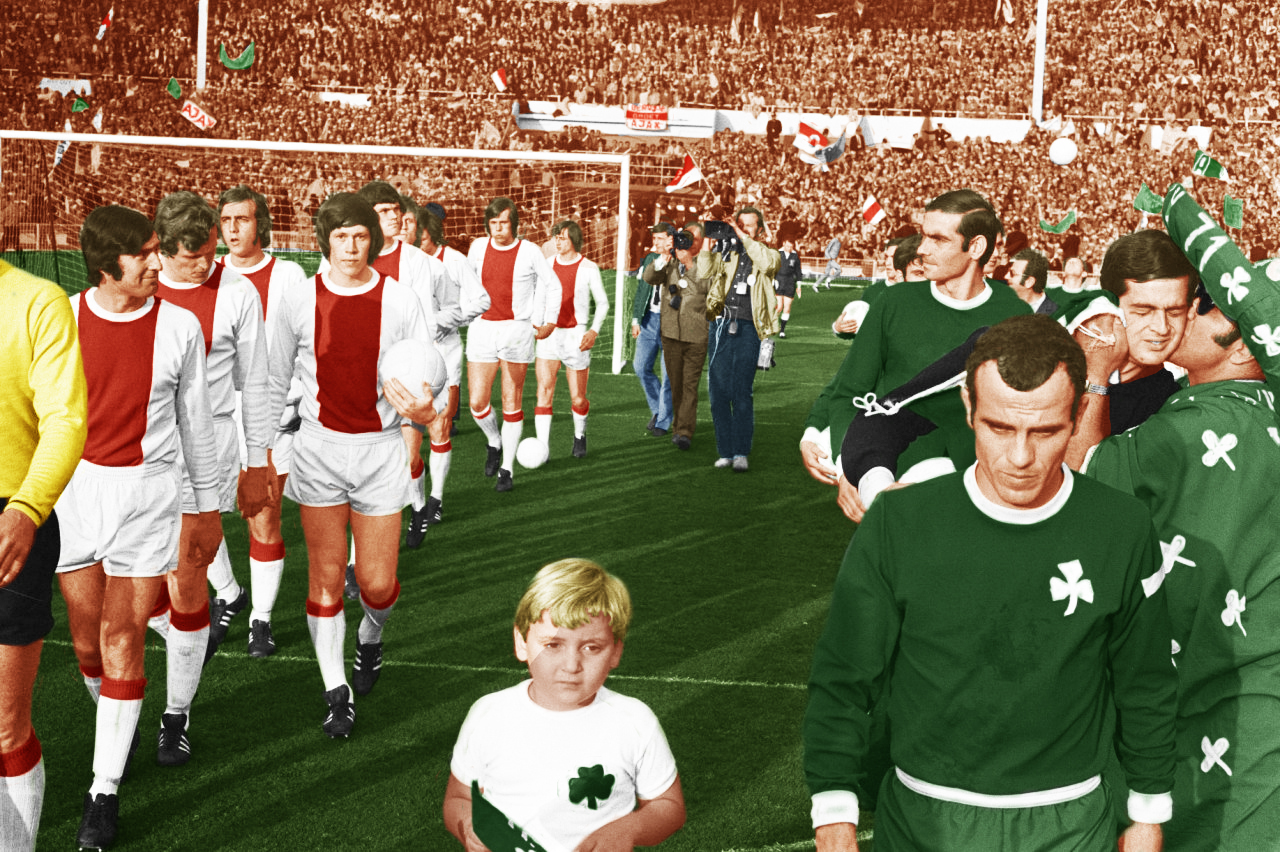
The teams walk out before the final.

The 1971 European Cup final was an association football match played between Ajax of the Netherlands and Panathinaikos of Greece on 2 June 1971 at Wembley Stadium, London, England. The showpiece event was the final match of the 1970–71 season of Europe's premier cup competition, the European Cup. Ajax were appearing in their second final, after losing it in 1969, while Panathinaikos were appearing in their first final.

Both teams progressed through four rounds to reach the final. Ajax comfortably won all of their ties by two goals, except for their 5–1 aggregate victory against Swiss team Basel in the second round. Panathinaikos' matches were close affairs, with the exception of their 7–1 aggregate victory against Jeunesse Esch of Luxembourg in the first round. Their quarter-final and semi-final victories were both won via the away goals rule.

Watched by a crowd of 83,179, Ajax took the lead in the 5th minute when Dick van Dijk scored. Ajax extended their lead in the 87th minute when a shot by Arie Haan deflected off defender Anthimos Kapsis and went into the Panathinaikos goal, giving Ajax its first European Cup victory by a score of 2–0.

This remains the only time a Greek team has reached a European Cup/Champions League final.

== Route to the final ==
Ajax				Round	Panathinaikos			
Opponent	Agg.	1st leg	2nd leg		Opponent	Agg.	1st leg	2nd leg
(Albania) 17 Nëntori Tirana	4–2	2–2 (A)	2–0 (H)	First round	(Luxembourg) Jeunesse Esch	7–1	2–1 (A)	5–0 (H)
(Switzerland) Basel	5–1	3–0 (H)	2–1 (A)	Second round	(Czechoslovakia) Slovan Bratislava	4–2	3–0 (H)	1–2 (A)
(Scotland) Celtic	3–1	3–0 (H)	0–1 (A)	Quarter-finals	(England) Everton	1–1 (a)	1–1 (A)	0–0 (H)
(Spain) Atlético Madrid	3–1	0–1 (A)	3–0 (H)	Semi-finals	(Socialist Federal Republic of Yugoslavia) Crvena zvezda	4–4 (a)	1–4 (A)	3–0 (H)

== Match ==
=== Details ===
2 June 1971

Ajax (Netherlands)	2–0	(Greece) Panathinaikos
Van Dijk 5'; Haan 87'	Report

Wembley Stadium, London
Attendance: 83,179
Referee: Jack Taylor (England)

Ajax	Panathinaikos

GK	1	(Netherlands) Heinz Stuy
SW	2	(Socialist Federal Republic of Yugoslavia) Velibor Vasović (c)
DF	3	(Netherlands) Wim Suurbier
DF	4	(Netherlands) Barry Hulshoff
MF	6	(Netherlands) Nico Rijnders	(substituted off) 46'
MF	7	(Netherlands) Johan Neeskens
FW	8	(Netherlands) Sjaak Swart	(substituted off) 46'
MF	9	(Netherlands) Gerrie Mühren
FW	10	(Netherlands) Dick van Dijk
FW	11	(Netherlands) Piet Keizer
MF	14	(Netherlands) Johan Cruyff
Substitutes:
DF	12	(West Germany) Horst Blankenburg	(substituted on) 46'
MF	15	(Netherlands) Arie Haan	(substituted on) 46'
GK	13	(Netherlands) Sies Wever
MF	5	(Netherlands) Ruud Suurendonk
Manager:
(Netherlands) Rinus Michels

GK	1	(Greece) Takis Ikonomopoulos
DF	2	(Greece) Yiannis Tomaras
DF	3	(Greece) Giorgos Vlachos
MF	4	(Greece) Kostas Eleftherakis
MF	5	(Greece) Aristidis Kamaras
DF	6	(Greece) Frangiskos Sourpis
MF	7	(Greece) Charis Grammos
FW	8	(Greece) Totis Filakouris
FW	9	(Greece) Antonis Antoniadis
FW	10	(Greece) Mimis Domazos (c)
DF	11	(Greece) Anthimos Kapsis
Substitutes:
GK		(Greece) Vasilis Konstantinou
DF		(Greece) Victor Mitropoulos
DF		(Greece) Kostas Athanasopoulos
DF		(Greece) Mitsos Dimitriou
MF		(Greece) Dimitris Kaligeris
Manager:
(Hungary) Ferenc Puskás

== See also ==
- 1970–71 Panathinaikos F.C. season
- 1971 European Cup Winners' Cup final
- 1971 Inter-Cities Fairs Cup final
- 1971 Intercontinental Cup
- AFC Ajax in international football
- Panathinaikos F.C. in European football
