= 1972 Greek Football Cup final =

1972 Greek Cup final
- Event: 1971–72 Greek Football Cup
PAOK	Panathinaikos
2	1
- Date: 5 July 1972
- Venue: Karaiskakis Stadium, Piraeus
- Referee: Christos Michas (Athens)
- Attendance: 34,831

The 1972 Greek Cup final was the 28th final of the Greek Cup. The match took place on 5 July 1972 at Karaiskakis Stadium. The contesting teams were PAOK and Panathinaikos. It was PAOK's sixth Greek Cup final and third consecutive in their 46 years of existence and Panathinaikos' eleventh Greek Cup final in their 64-year history. PAOK won the first title in their history and at the same time they deprived their opponent of the domestic double.

== Venue ==
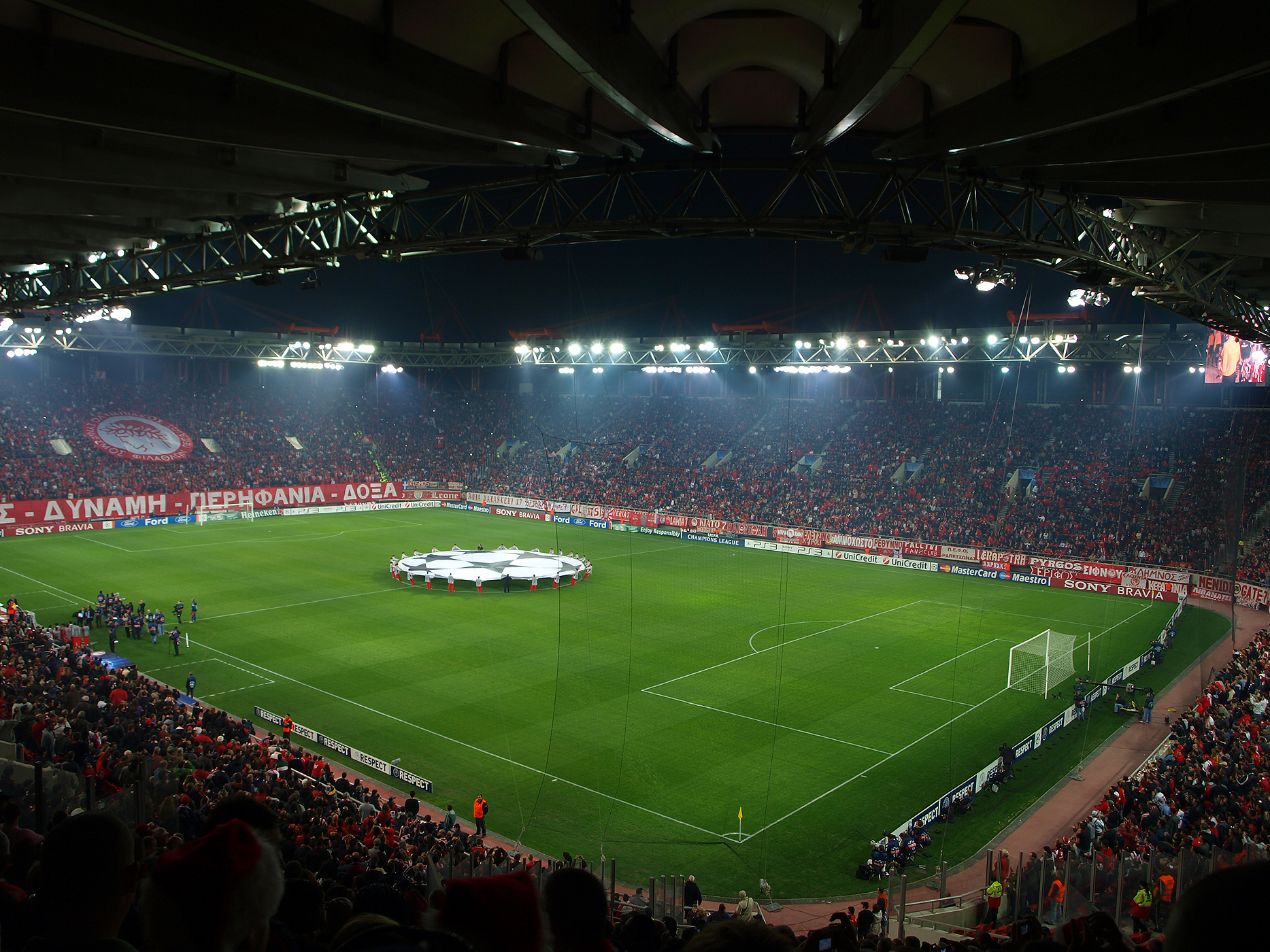
Karaiskakis Stadium.

This was the sixth Greek Cup final held at Karaiskakis Stadium, after the 1957, 1958, 1965, 1969 and 1971 finals. (Karaiskakis also hosted the replay match of the 1960 final between Panathinaikos and Olympiacos).

Karaiskakis Stadium was built in 1895 and renovated once in 1964. The stadium is used as a venue for Olympiacos and Ethnikos Piraeus and was used for Greece on various occasions. Its current capacity is 42,000 and hosted a European Cup Winners' Cup final in 1971 and the first leg of the Intercontinental Cup final in 1971.

== Background ==
PAOK had reached the Greek Cup final five times. The last time that they played in a final was in 1971, where they had lost to Olympiacos by 3–1.

Panathinaikos had reached the Greek Cup final ten times, winning five of them. The last time that they had played in a final was in 1969, where they won Olympiacos on a toss of a coin after a 1–1 draw at the end of the extra time.

The two teams had met each other in a Cup final one time in the 1955 final.

== Route to the final ==
PAOK		Round	Panathinaikos	
Opponent	Result		Opponent	Result
Foinikas Polichni	5–1 (H)	First round	Orfeas Egaleo	9–1 (H)
Pierikos	3–1 (H)	Second round	Xanthi	3–0 (H)
Bye		Additional round	Bye	
Aias Salamina	2–0 (H)	Round of 16	Apollon Athens	1–0 (A)
Aris	2–1 (A)	Quarter-finals	Trikala	6–2 (A)
Lamia	2–0 (H)	Semi-finals	Panionios	2–0 (H)

== Match ==
=== Details ===
5 July 1972
20:30 EET

PAOK	2–1	Panathinaikos
Koudas 2', 88'	Report (page 1)	Papadimitriou 89'

Karaiskakis Stadium, Piraeus
Attendance: 34,831
Referee: Christos Michas (Athens)

GK	(Greece) Savvas Chatzioannou
DF	(Greece) Giannis Gounaris
DF	(Greece) Pavlos Papadopoulos
DF	(Greece) Konstantinos Iosifidis
DF	(Greece) Aristarchos Fountoukidis
MF	(Greece) Christos Terzanidis
MF	(Greece) Michalis Bellis
MF	(Greece) Stavros Sarafis	(substituted off) 68'
FW	(Greece) Koulis Apostolidis
FW	(Greece) Giorgos Koudas (c)
FW	(Greece) Achilleas Aslanidis	(substituted off) 76'
Substitutes:
MF	(Greece) Giannis Mantzourakis	(substituted on) 76'
FW	(Greece) Vasilis Lazos	(substituted on) 68'
Manager:
(England) Les Shannon

GK	(Greece) Takis Ikonomopoulos
DF	(Greece) Nikos Karamanlis	(substituted off) 57'
DF	(Greece) Giorgos Gonios
DF	(Greece) Frangiskos Sourpis
DF	(Greece) Mitsos Dimitriou
DF	(Greece) Kostas Athanasopoulos
MF	(Greece) Kostas Eleftherakis
MF	(Greece) Charis Grammos
MF	(Greece) Mimis Domazos (c)
FW	(Greece) Antonis Antoniadis
FW	(Greece) Takis Papadimitriou
Substitutes:
DF	(Greece) Giorgos Vlachos	(substituted on) 57'
Manager:
(Hungary) Ferenc Puskas

Assistant referees:
Stathis Papavasiliou (Piraeus)
Nikos Zlatanos (Thessaloniki)

Match rules

- 90 minutes
- 30 minutes of extra time if necessary
- Penalty shootout if scores still level
- Five named substitutes
- Maximum of two substitutions

== See also ==
- 1971–72 Greek Football Cup
