= Petros Panopoulos =

Greek footballer

Petros Panopoulos (Greek: Πέτρος Πανόπουλος; born 22 January 1944) is a former Greek footballer who played as a goalkeeper.

== Club career ==
He started his career with Palamiaki as a striker and then established himself as a goalkeeper. He played in the Lamia from the first year of their establishment and served the club as a footballer, manager and agent. In 1968 he was named top goalkeeper of the second national division.

He was a transfer goal of Marton Bukovi to Olympiacos while training at Renti but he was eventually transferred together with Antonis Antoniadis to Panathinaikos in 1968. He played for Panathinaikos until 1972. He was a member of the team that participated in the final of the Champions Cup in 1971. He failed to establish himself as a key player in the team as he found himself in the shadow of two goalkeepers who were among the best in the history of Panathinaikos, Takis Ikonomopoulos and Vasilis Konstantinou.

He then moved to Vyzas Megaa and AO Chania, finishing his career in 1979.

== Managerial career ==
He contributed to the technical staff of Panathinaikos during the 1980s by working as a manager and assistant manager as a personal choice of Yiorgos Vardinogiannis. He worked alongside Vassilis Daniil, Gunder Bengtsson, Christo Bonev and Ivica Osim. He won Championships and Cups having coached players such as Saravakos, Zaets, Rocha, Sarganis, Vazeha. At the beginning of his career, he took over Antonis Nikopolidis.

He discovered Niki Bakoyanni and convinced her to take up the high jump at the age of 12.
