= 1970–71 Greek Football Cup =

1970–71 Greek Cup
Tournament details
- Country: Greece

Final positions
- Champions: Olympiacos (14th title)
- Runners-up: PAOK

Tournament statistics
- Top goal scorer(s): Andreas Papaemmanouil (13 goals)

The 1970–71 Greek Football Cup was the 29th edition of the Greek Football Cup. The competition culminated with the Greek Cup final, held at Karaiskakis Stadium, on 9 June 1971. The match was contested by Olympiacos and PAOK, with Olympiacos winning by 3–1.

== Calendar ==
Round	Date(s)	Fixtures	Clubs	New entries
First Round	13 September 1970	??	?? → ??	??
Second Round	30 September 1970	??	?? → ??	??
Third Round	11 November 1970	??	?? → ??	??
Fourth Round	6 January 1971	??	?? → ??	??
Fifth Round	20 January 1971	??	?? → 32	??
Sixth Round	3, 4, 11 February 1971	16	48 → 32	32
Round of 32	28 February 1971	16	32 → 16	16
Round of 16	31 March 1971	7	16 → 8	none
Quarter-finals	5 May 1971	4	8 → 4	none
Semi-finals	26 May 1971	2	4 → 2	none
Final	6 June 1971	1	2 → 1	none

== Qualification round ==
From the Sixth Round onwards:

=== Sixth round ===
Team 1	Score	Team 2
AEK Athens	5–1	Phoebus Kremasti
Aias Salamina	4–2	Irodotos
Paniliakos	1–0	Panachaiki
Anagennisi Arta	0–0 (5–6 p)	Panetolikos
Chalkida	1–1 (3–1 p)	Edessaikos
Lamia	1–0	Kastoria
Apollon Krya Vrysi	1–0	Anagennisi Karditsa
Niki Volos	1–1 (3–1 p)	AEL
Iraklis	2–0	Makedonikos
Olympiacos Xanthi	1–0	Panserraikos
Pandramaikos	2–0	Xanthi
Orestis Orestiada	1–0	Doxa Drama
Apollon Athens	2–1^{*}	EPA Larnaca
Kalamata	1–0	PAS Giannina
Panchiakos	?	Apollon Mytilene
A.E. Mesolongi	?	Pannafpliakos

^{*}The match was interrupted in the expense of EPA Larnaca while the score was 2–1. That remained as the final score

• The last 16 of the previous season's Cup qualified for the 2nd round.

== Knockout phase ==
In the knockout phase, teams play against each other over a single match. If the match ends up as a draw, extra time will be played. If a winner doesn't occur after the extra time the winner emerges by penalty shoot-out.
The mechanism of the draws for each round is as follows:

- In the draw for the round of 32, the teams that had qualified to previous' season Round of 16 are seeded and the clubs that passed the qualification round are unseeded.
- In the draws for the round of 16 onwards, there are no seedings, and teams from the same group can be drawn against each other.

== Bracket ==
Round of 32
Iraklis (a.e.t.)	5
Kavala	2
Olympiacos Xanthi	3
Orestis Orestiada	0
Panionios (a.e.t.)	2
Aias Salamina	1
Panetolikos	1
Apollon Kalamarias	0
Atromitos	4
OFI	0
Apollon Krya Vrysi (a.e.t.)	2
Niki Volos	1
Pandramaikos	1
Olympiacos	2
Chalkida	1
Egaleo	0
Kallithea	0
PAOK	2
Trikala	2
Aris	1
Kalamata	0
Panathinaikos	6
Pannafpliakos	2
Vyzas Megara	0
Lamia	1
AEK Athens	4
Panchiakos	0
Paniliakos	1
Panelefsiniakos	2
Pierikos	1
Olympiacos Volos (p)	0(4)
Apollon Athens	0(3)

Round of 16
Iraklis	6
Olympiacos Xanthi	2
Panionios	2
Panetolikos	0
Atromitos	3
Apollon Krya Vrysi	0
Olympiacos	4
Chalkida	0
PAOK	6
Trikala	1
Panathinaikos	3
Pannafpliakos	0
AEK Athens	4
Paniliakos	0
Panelefsiniakos	0
Olympiacos Volos	2

Quarter-finals
Iraklis	2
Panionios	0
Atromitos	1
Olympiacos	4
PAOK	3
Panathinaikos	2
AEK Athens	6
Olympiacos Volos	1

Semi-finals
Iraklis	1
Olympiacos	2
PAOK	3
AEK Athens	2

Final
Olympiacos	3
PAOK	1

== Round of 32 ==
Team 1	Score	Team 2
Pandramaikos	1–2	Olympiacos
Kallithea	0–2	PAOK
Lamia	1–4	AEK Athens
Iraklis	5–2 (a.e.t.)	Kavala
Panionios	2–1 (a.e.t.)	Aias Salamina
Kalamata	0–6	Panathinaikos
Panetolikos	1–0	Apollon Kalamarias
Pannafpliakos	2–0	Vyzas Megara
Trikala	2–1	Aris
Olympiacos Volos	0–0 (4–3 p)	Apollon Athens
Chalkida	1–0	Egaleo
Panchiakos	0–1	Paniliakos
Panelefsiniakos	2–1	Pierikos
Olympiacos Xanthi	3–0	Orestis Orestiada
Apollon Krya Vrysi	2–1 (a.e.t.)	Niki Volos
Atromitos	4–0	OFI

== Round of 16 ==
Team 1	Score	Team 2
AEK Athens	4–0	Paniliakos
Olympiacos	4–0	Chalkida
Panionios	2–0	Panetolikos
Iraklis	6–2	Olympiacos Xanthi
PAOK	6–1	Trikala
Atromitos	3–0	Apollon Krya Vrysi
Panelefsiniakos	0–2	Olympiacos Volos
Panathinaikos	3–0	Pannafpliakos

== Quarter-finals ==
Team 1	Score	Team 2
Atromitos	1–4	Olympiacos
Iraklis	2–0	Panionios
AEK Athens	6–1	Olympiacos Volos
PAOK	3–2	Panathinaikos

== Semi-finals ==
Team 1	Score	Team 2
Iraklis	1–2	Olympiacos
PAOK	3–2	AEK Athens

== Final ==
9 June 1971
20:30 EET

Olympiacos	3–1	PAOK
Angelis 18'; Gioutsos 43'; Pamboullis 82'	Report (page 1)	Sarafis 47'

Karaiskakis Stadium, Piraeus
Attendance: 38,000
Referee: Christos Michas (Athens)
