= Petros Karavitis =

Greek footballer

Personal information
- Full name: Petros Karavitis
- Date of birth: 11 March 1952 (age 74)
- Place of birth: Haidari, Athens, Greece
- Height: 1.77 m (5 ft 10 in)
- Positions: Midfielder; defender; left winger

Youth career
- 1966–1968: Chaidari
- 1968–1970: Olympiacos

Senior career*
Years	Team	Apps	(Gls)
1970–1980	Olympiacos	201	(50)
1980–1982	AEK Athens	27	(6)
1982–1984	Proodeftiki		
1984–1986	Chaidari		
Total		228	(56)

International career
1971	Greece U21		
1975–1979	Greece	10	(3)
1975–1979	Greece military	5	(1)

Managerial career
- 1987: Panarkadikos
- 1989–1990: Pankorinthiakos
- 1990–1991: Α.F.C. Patras
- 1991–1992: Egaleo
- 1992–1993: Kerkyra
- 1993: Panarkadikos
- * Club domestic league appearances and goals

Petros Karavitis (Greek: Πέτρος Καραβίτης; born 11 March 1952) is a Greek former professional footballer who played as a midfielder.

== Club career ==
Karavitis began his football career in 1966 at his hometown club, Chaidari.

He was transferred to the youth team of Olympiacos for a fee of 30,000 drachmas in 1968. In December 1970, manager Lakis Petropoulos promoted Karavitis to the men's team, where he remained a regular in several roles for ten years. He won four Greek Championships and three Greek Cups, including two domestic doubles in 1973 and 1975. In December 1980, Karavitis left the club after the then president, Stavros Daifas did not proceed in renewing his contract.

Thus, on 17 December 1980 Karavitis signed for AEK Athens. During his one-and-a-half-year spell at AEK, Karavitis was used as a regular. On 25 April 1982, in AEK's away match against Panserraikos, he was sent off alongside Mojaš Radonjić for insulting the referee. As a result, he was punished with a 19-match ban, which combined with his age, led to his departure from the club. On 11 December 1982, Karavitis signed for Proodeftiki, where he played for one and a half season. In 1984, Karavitis returned to Chaidari as a player-manager, and finished his playing career in 1986.

== International career ==
Karavitis was a member of Greece U21, which in 1971 won the Balkan Youth Championship.

Karavitis played a total of 10 appearances with Greece, scoring three goals, from 1975 to 1979. His debut took place on 30 December 1975, under Alketas Panagoulias in an away friendly 3–2 loss against Italy, where he played for 46 minutes before being replaced by Georgios Delikaris.

== After football ==
After the end of his career, Karavitis was involved in coaching, but remaining in low categories, while he was also involved in politics as a candidate in Athens B with the party of LAOS and later at the District level, with the combination of Giorgos Patoulis. He was also involved in the administration of Chaidari as the head of a group of investors.

== Honours ==
Olympiacos

- Alpha Ethniki: 1972–73, 1973–74, 1974–75, 1979–80
- Greek Cup: 1970–71, 1972–73, 1974–75
- Greek Super Cup: 1980

Greece U21

- Balkan Youth Championship: 1971
