= Yiannis Tomaras =

Greek footballer

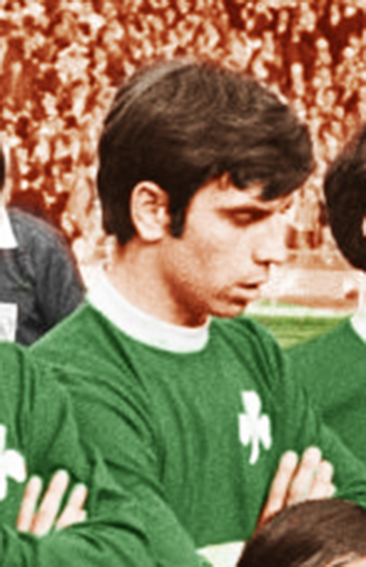
- Tomaras at the 1971 European Cup Final

Personal information
- Full name: Ioannis Tomaras
- Date of birth: 22 January 1947 (age 79)
- Position: Midfielder

Senior career*
| Years | Team | Apps | (Gls) |
| 1968–1974 | Panathinaikos | | |
| 1978–1980 | Ifestos Peristeri | | |

International career
| 1970–1971 | Greece | 3 | (3) |
- * Club domestic league appearances and goals

Yiannis Tomaras (Greek: Γιάννης Τομαράς; born 16 March 1947) is a former Greek football player of the late 1960s - early 1970s era.

Tomaras played right back for Panathinaikos between the years 1968 and 1974.

He played for Panathinaikos at the 1971 European Cup Final.

Tomaras was seriously injured on 15 December 1971, with a double break of his leg, in the Panathinaikos - Nacional Montevideo home game for the Intercontinental Cup.

== Honours ==
Panathinaikos

- Alpha Ethniki: 1969, 1970, 1972, 1977
