= Andreas Papaemmanouil =

Greek footballer and manager (1939–2020)

- Andreas Papaemmanouil

Personal information
- Full name: Andreas Papaemmanouil
- Date of birth: 18 February 1939
- Place of birth: Neo Faliro, Kingdom of Greece
- Date of death: 1 March 2020 (aged 81)
- Place of death: Maroussi, Greece
- Positions: Forward; midfielder

Youth career
- 1952–1958: Peiraikos Syndesmos

Senior career*
| Years | Team | Apps | (Gls) |
| 1958–1969 | Panathinaikos | 193 | (80) |
| 1969 | → Canterbury (loan) | 3 | (0) |
| 1969–1972 | AEK Athens | 63 | (7) |
| Total | | 259 | (87) |

International career
| 1959–1965 | Greece | 16 | (6) |
| 1960 | Greece Olympic | 1 | (0) |

Managerial career
- 1972–1978: Anagennisi Arta
- 1979: Ilisiakos
- 1979–1980: Thriamvos Athens
- 1980: Panathinaikos
- 1982: Acharnaikos
- 1983: Panathinaikos
- 1983–1984: Acharnaikos
- 1984–1985: Kerkyra
- 1985–1986: Ilioupoli
- 1986–1987: Panelefsiniakos
- 1987: Atromitos
- 1987–1988: Athinaikos
- 1990–1991: Olympiacos Loutraki
- 1991–1992: Kallithea
- * Club domestic league appearances and goals

Andreas Papaemmanouil (Greek: Ανδρέας Παπαεμμανουήλ; 18 February 1939 – 1 March 2020) was a Greek professional footballer who played as a forward and a later manager. His nickname was "the Rabbit" (Greek: "ο Κούνελος"), due to his speed and agility.

== Early life ==
Papaemmanouil was born on 18 February 1939 in Neo Faliro. The proximity of the family's house to the Karaiskakis stadium made it easy for the Olympiacos people to notice Papaemmanouil on the streets of the neighborhood. In 1952, at the age of 14, he played in the first team of Peiraikos and after 3 years at the age of 17, his name began to be heavily discussed in Piraeus, while the club's friendly relations with Olympiacos leave no doubt about his immediate move to the red and whites. Even though Andreas Mouratis had spoken flatteringly of him and his father's employer, the weaver Kostas Velissaropoulos, was pressuring him to take Papaemmanouil to Olympiacos, the visit to the family home of agents of Panathinaikos Asprogerakas and Matzevelakis played a catalytic role as a consequence in 1958 Papaemmanouil signed to the greens receiving 7,000 drachmas, while 100,000 drachmas went to Peiraikos.

== Club career ==
In 1959, Papaemmanouil won the Athens FCA League, competing in the last match of Panathinaikos in the competition, while at the end of the season they won the first championship under a national division. The following season, under Harry Game he developed his attacking abilities as he placed Papaemmanouil in the center of the attack and the results were impressive, as he scored 23 goals in 28 appearances, becoming the top scorer of his team and led them to win the title again. On 24 July 1960 he scored a hat-trick against Olympiacos in a 4–1 home win and he is the only Panathinaikos player to score a hat-trick in a derby of the eternal enemies. His main characteristics were his incredible speed, his dynamic moves and his very powerful shot. Under Stjepan Bobek, relocated him as a left midfielder, forming an amazing triplet alongside Takis Loukanidis and Mimis Domazos they won the championship in 1964 undefeated. At Panathinaikos he won 6 Championships and 2 Greek Cups.

In 1968 he was sidelined from the club after a interference of the dictatorial regime. After a period of isolation and individual training, on March 1969 Papaemmanouil traveled to Australia and joined Canterbury for six months. He returned to Greece and after he was released from Panathinaikos, he initially signed for Ikaros Athens, but with the intervention of the technical director of AEK Athens, Kleanthis Maropoulos at the Sports General Manager, Aslanidis, his sport's card at Ikaros was canceled and on 2 October he signed for AEK.

At AEK, Papaemmanouil formed a formidable attacking trio with Mimis Papaioannou and Kostas Nikolaidis, which helped the club win the championship of 1971. He set a club scoring record on 13 September 1970 in a Cup match against the lower-tier club Kipoupoli when he scored 7 of AEK's 20 total goals. On 28 December 1971, he also played in a friendly against Bayern Munich at AEK Stadium, where he was introduced in the final minutes and scored the only goal of the match from a direct free-kick. He left AEK in the summer of 1972, ending his playing career.

Papaemmanouil was selected amongst the greatest Greek football players for the decade of the 1960's from gazzetta.gr.

== International career ==
Papaemmanouil made 16 appearances and scored six goals for Greece from 1959 to 1965. He made his debut in a 1–1 draw against France, on 12 March 1959 for the 1960 European championship qualifiers.

== Managerial career ==
After his playing day were over, Papaemmanouil followed a coaching career. He started in the Anagennisi Arta, where he remained for 6 years. On 11 September 1979 he took over Thriamvos Athens. This was followed by Kerkyra, Tunisiakos, Kallithea and Fostiras. In 1980, he spent 6 months at the bench of Panathinaikos, recording to his credit the 4–2 victory over Juventus at home. He also coached the greens briefly in 1983. From 1992 to 2002 he was the coach of the national team's youth divisions.

== Personal life ==
Papaemmanouil was the 9th child of a family in which there were 10 siblings, 7 girls and three boys, all three of whom became footballers. The eldest brother of his family, Petros played in small teams and stopped early due to health problems, while the third, Giorgos, also played a year in Olympiacos. Since the beginning of 2020, he faced serious health problems, as a result of which he died on 1 March 2020 in the hospital of Marousi.

== Honours ==
Panathinaikos

- Alpha Ethniki: 1959–60, 1960–61, 1961–62, 1963–64, 1964–65, 1968–69
- Greek Cup: 1966–67, 1968–69
- Athens FCA League: 1958–59

AEK Athens

- Alpha Ethniki: 1970–71

Individual

- Greek Cup top scorer: 1970–71
