= Panchiakos GS =

Panchiakos GS (Greek: Παγχιακός Γυμναστικός Σύλλογος) is a Greek multi-sports club based on Chios (town).

It was founded in 1924 and its colours are blue and white. They maintain departments of basketball, volleyball, track and field and table tennis. In the past there was also football department.
