= Dimitrios Kalligeris =

Greek professional footballer

Personal information
- Full name: Dimitrios Kalligeris
- Date of birth: 1 January 1949
- Place of birth: Athens, Kingdom of Greece
- Date of death: 4 December 2011 (aged 62)
- Place of death: Nea Ionia, Greece
- Position: Forward

Senior career*
Years	Team	Apps	(Gls)
1970–1972	Panathinaikos	27	
1972–1974	Kalamata		
- * Club domestic league appearances and goals

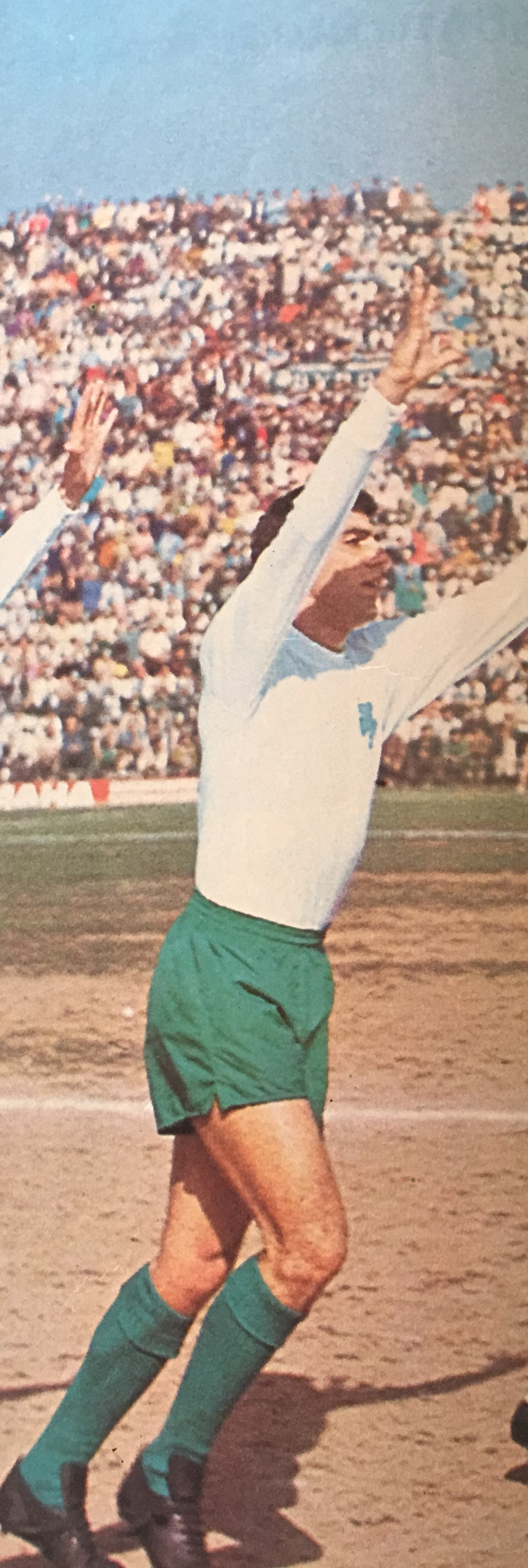

Dimitrios Kalligeris (Greek: Δημήτριος Καλλιγέρης; 1949–2011) was a Greek professional footballer who played for Panathinaikos as a right winger. He was born in Athens, Greece, on 1 January 1949. He started his football career in the Panathinaikos youth system and was member of the team that reached the European Cup of Champions in 1971. He played for Panathinaikos from 1970 to 1972 and later, he played for Kalamata F.C. from 1972 to 1974.

After retirement, he lived in Thebes, Greece. He owned a restaurant and he was an amateur hagiographer. He died in a car accident in the Athens suburb of Nea Ionia.
