= Victor Mitropoulos =

Greek footballer

Victor Mitropoulos (Βίκτωρ Μητρόπουλος, Βίκτωρας Μητρόπουλος, born 14 February 1947) is a Greek former football defender.

He played for Egaleo and transferred to Panathinaikos in 1968. He was 1971 European Cup runner up but didn't play at the final because Ferenc Puskás sent him back to Athens. However, he played in the 1971 Intercontinental Cup.

Mitropoulos won 3 Greek championships (1969, 1970, 1972) playing for Panathinaikos. He also played for Orpheus Aegaleo in Beta Ethniki from 1976 to 1977.

He later became president of Egaleo and president of the Hellenic League (EPAE).
