= Vasilis Konstantinou =

Greek footballer

Personal information
- Full name: Vasilios Konstantinou
- Date of birth: 19 November 1947 (age 78)
- Place of birth: Athens, Greece
- Height: 1.78 m (5 ft 10 in)
- Position: Goalkeeper

Youth career
- 1961–1964: Maroussi GS

Senior career*
Years	Team	Apps	(Gls)
1964–1983	Panathinaikos	302	(0)
1973	→ Toronto Homer (loan)		
1978	→ Toronto Metros-Croatia (loan)	13	(0)
1979	→ Toronto Blizzard (loan)	0	(0)
1983–1984	OFI	10	(0)
Total		325	(0)

International career^{‡}
1964–1965	Greece U19		
1973–1983	Greece	28	(0)
- * Club domestic league appearances and goals as of 30 September 2016 ‡ National team caps and goals as of 24 October 2015

Vasilis Konstantinou (Greek: Βασίλης Κωνσταντίνου; born 19 November 1947) is a former Greek football goalkeeper whose career spanned three decades: the 1960s, 1970s and 1980s. He also served as president of FC Panathinaikos from 2017 to 2019.

== Club career ==
Konstantinou started playing football at Marousi GS and in 1964 he signed for Panathinaikos. He was the back-up goalkeeper of Takis Ikonomopoulos. Konstantinou filled in successfully for Ikonomopoulos, when the situation called for it, as was the case in the European Cup semi-finals in 1971 against Red Star Belgrade, which sent Panathinaikos to the final. Eventually, Konstantinou became the first-choice keeper, a position he held until the 1983 season. In the summer of 1973 he played abroad in the National Soccer League with Toronto Homer. On 10 June 1978 he again traveled to Toronto and played for Toronto Metros-Croatia until August 6. The following summer he also went to Canada to play for the same club, which were renamed to Toronto Blizzard. He ended his career in 1984, playing for OFI.

== International career ==
Konstantinou was capped 28 times with Greece. He was the keeper for Greece for the UEFA Euro 1980 Final.

== Honours ==
Panathinaikos

- Alpha Ethniki: 1964–65, 1968–69, 1969–70, 1971–72, 1976–77
- Greek Cup: 1966–67, 1968–69, 1976–77
- Balkans Cup: 1977
