= 1968–69 Greek Football Cup =

1968–69 Greek Cup
Tournament details
- Country: Greece

Final positions
- Champions: Panathinaikos (5th title)
- Runners-up: Olympiacos

Tournament statistics
- Top goal scorer(s): Giorgos Sideris (9 goals)

The 1968–69 Greek Football Cup was the 27th edition of the Greek Football Cup. The competition culminated with the Greek Cup Final, held at Karaiskakis Stadium, on 9 July 1969. The match was contested by Panathinaikos and Olympiacos, with Panathinaikos winning on the toss of a coin, because of the final result (1–1).

== Calendar ==
From the last qualifying round onwards:

Round	Date(s)	Fixtures	Clubs	New entries
Last qualifying round	1969	16	48 → 32	32
Round of 32	14 May 1969	16	32 → 16	16
Round of 16	11 June 1969	7	16 → 8	none
Quarter-finals	1969	4	8 → 4	none
Semi-finals	1969	2	4 → 2	none
Final	9 July 1969	1	2 → 1	none

== Last qualifying round ==
Team 1	Score	Team 2
Egaleo	3–0	Ethnikos Asteras
Fostiras	4–0	Ilisiakos
Asteras Zografou	3–2	Athinais
Panelefsiniakos	2–0	Vyzas Megara
Atromitos Piraeus	1–1 (a.e.t.)^{*}	Aias Salamina
Kalamata	3–0	Olympiacos Loutraki
OFI	4–1	Ergotelis
Lamia	2–1	Thiva
Kerkyra	4–1	PAS Giannina
Olympiacos Volos	5–1	Karditsa A.C.
Pierikos	3–3 (a.e.t.)^{*}	Veria
Olympiacos Kozani	1–0	Kastoria
Alexandroupoli	1–0 (a.e.t.)	Kavala
Megas Alexandros	3–2	Foinikas Polichni
Makedonikos	1–1 (a.e.t.)^{*}	Achilleas Triandria
Panetolikos	3–1	APS Patrai

^{*}Coin toss.

• The last 16 of previous season's Cup qualified for the 2nd round.

== Knockout phase ==
In the knockout phase, teams play against each other over a single match. If the match ends up as a draw, extra time will be played. If a winner doesn't occur after the extra time the winner emerges by a flip of a coin.
The mechanism of the draws for each round is as follows:

- In the draw for the round of 32, the teams that had qualified to previous' season Round of 16 are seeded and the clubs that passed the qualification round are unseeded.
- In the draws for the round of 16 onwards, there are no seedings, and teams from the same group can be drawn against each other.

== Bracket ==
Round of 32
Panathinaikos	3
Asteras Zografou	0
Panelefsiniakos	1
Chania	0
Panachaiki	2
Chalkida	0
AEK Athens	5
Lamia	0
Makedonikos	4
Aris Ptolemaidas	0
Olympiacos Volos	3
Panserraikos	0
Kerkyra	0
Panionios	2
AEL Limassol	4
Atromitos	2
Alexandroupoli	0
Iraklis	1
Olympiacos	4
Fostiras	1
OFI	3
Apollon Athens	1
Olympiacos Kozani	1
Aris	2
Kalamata	0
Ethnikos Piraeus	2
Pierikos	3
Egaleo	1
Panetolikos	4
Aias Salamina	0
PAOK	6
Megas Alexandros	0

Round of 16
Panathinaikos	4
Panelefsiniakos	2
Panachaiki	4
AEK Athens	2
Makedonikos	5
Olympiacos Volos	1
Panionios	3
AEL Limassol	1
Iraklis	2
Olympiacos	3
OFI	2
Aris	1
Ethnikos Piraeus (w/o)	2
Pierikos	0
Panetolikos	2
PAOK (a.e.t.)	3

Quarter-finals
Panathinaikos	5
Panachaiki	1
Makedonikos	1
Panionios (a.e.t.)	3
Olympiacos	4
OFI	1
Ethnikos Piraeus (a.e.t.)	5
PAOK	4

Semi-finals
Panathinaikos	1
Panionios	0
Olympiacos (a.e.t.)	4
Ethnikos Piraeus	3

Final
Panathinaikos (c)	1
Olympiacos	1

== Round of 32 ==
Team 1	Score	Team 2
Kalamata	0–2	Ethnikos Piraeus
OFI	3–1	Apollon Athens
Panetolikos	4–0	Aias Salamina
Panathinaikos	3–0	Asteras Zografou
Panachaiki	2–0	Chalkida
AEK Athens	5–0	Lamia
Kerkyra	0–2	Panionios
Panelefsiniakos	1–0	Chania
Olympiacos	4–1	Fostiras
AEL Limassol	4–2	Atromitos
Pierikos	3–1	Egaleo
Olympiacos Volos	3–0	Panserraikos
PAOK	6–0	Megas Alexandros
Makedonikos	4–0	Aris Ptolemaidas
Alexandroupoli	0–1	Iraklis
Olympiacos Kozani	1–2	Aris

== Round of 16 ==
Team 1	Score	Team 2
Makedonikos	5–1	Olympiacos Volos
Panetolikos	2–3 (a.e.t.)	PAOK
Panionios	3–1	AEL Limassol
Iraklis	2–3	Olympiacos
Panathinaikos	4–2	Panelefsiniakos
Panachaiki	4–2	AEK Athens
OFI	2–1	Aris
Ethnikos Piraeus	2–0 (w/o)	Pierikos

== Quarter-finals ==
Team 1	Score	Team 2
Olympiacos	4–1	OFI
Makedonikos	1–3 (a.e.t.)	Panionios
Panathinaikos	5–1	Panachaiki
Ethnikos Piraeus	5–4 (a.e.t.)	PAOK

== Semi-finals ==
Team 1	Score	Team 2
Panathinaikos	1–0	Panionios
Olympiacos	4–3 (a.e.t.)	Ethnikos Piraeus

== Final ==
9 July 1969
21:00 EET

Panathinaikos	1–1 (a.e.t.)	Olympiacos
Domazos 56'	Report	Sideris 49'

Karaiskakis Stadium, Piraeus
Attendance: 39,000
Referee: Christos Michas (Athens)

Panathinaikos won on a toss of a coin.
