= Lakis Petropoulos =

Greek footballer and manager (1932–1996)

Personal information
- Full name: Vasilios Petropoulos
- Date of birth: 29 August 1932
- Place of birth: Athens, Greece
- Date of death: 30 June 1996 (aged 63)
- Place of death: USA
- Position: Midfielder

Senior career*
Years	Team	Apps	(Gls)
1950–1963	Panathinaikos		

International career
1953–1957	Greece	3	(0)

Managerial career
- 1964–1966: Greece
- 1967: Panathinaikos
- 1968–1970: Panathinaikos
- 1969–1971: Greece
- 1971: Olympiacos
- 1971–1972: Iraklis
- 1972–1975: Olympiacos
- 1976–1977: Greece
- 1977–1978: Cercle Brugge
- 1978: PAOK
- 1978–1979: Panathinaikos
- 1979–1981: Panionios
- 1981–1982: Panathinaikos
- 1984: Apollon Athens
- 1984: OFI
- 1985: Apollon Athens
- 1987–1990: Anorthosis Famagusta
- * Club domestic league appearances and goals

Lakis Petropoulos (Greek: Λάκης Πετρόπουλος, 29 August 1932 – 30 June 1996) was a Greek football player who played as midfielder for Panathinaikos and a later manager.

== Playing career ==
=== Club ===
Petropoulos played for Panathinaikos from 1952 to 1961 earning the Greek championship three times (1953, 1960, 1961).

=== International ===
Petropoulos was capped 3 times for Greece. He was also member of the national side for the 1952 Olympic Games, but he did not play in any matches.

== Managerial career ==
Petropoulos managed Greece, Panathinaikos, Olympiacos, Iraklis, Cercle Brugge, PAOK, Panionios, Apollon Athens and OFI.

After his retirement as football players, he became assistant coach in Panathinaikos. In 1968 he took over as head coach and helmed the team from 1968 to 1970 earning one double in 1969 and one greek championship in 1970.

In 1972-1975 he worked for Olympiacos, with whom he won three consecutive championships, even though he did not stay until the end of the 1974-75 season.
