= Georgios Delikaris =

Greek footballer

Personal information
- Full name: Georgios Delikaris
- Date of birth: 22 July 1951 (age 75)
- Place of birth: Piraeus, Greece
- Height: 1.78 m (5 ft 10 in)
- Position: Forward

Senior career*
Years	Team	Apps	(Gls)
1967–1969	Argonautis Piraeus		
1969–1978	Olympiacos	226	(25)
1978–1981	Panathinaikos	35	(5)
Total		261	(30)

International career
1971–1981	Greece	32	(7)
- * Club domestic league appearances and goals

Georgios Delikaris (Greek: Γεώργιος Δεληκάρης, born 22 July 1951) is a former Greek football player, who spent the greatest part of his career at Olympiacos. He is widely accepted amongst fans as one of the greatest Greek footballers of all time, coming in fourth in the Greek vote for the UEFA Jubilee Awards and first amongst former Olympiacos players. Nicknamed the "Gianni Rivera of Greece", he is also often compared to George Best, due to similarity in appearance and playing style. Though still revered as an Olympiacos legend, he is also well remembered for his switch to arch-rivals Panathinaikos, for the last three years of his playing career, which ended prematurely, when he decided to retire at the age of 29.

== Club career ==
=== Early career ===
Delikaris was born in 1951 and began his career with local club Argonaytis Piraeus. His chance to shine came in July 1968, when he was picked to represent Piraeus at an exhibition match against players from Athenian teams. A year later (July 1969) he joined Piraeus giants Olympiacos, the team he supported as a child, for a fee of just over 1 million drachmas along with the exchange of four Olympiacos players.

=== Olympiacos ===
==== 1969–70 ====
His debut in the red and white jersey came when he featured in a friendly against his old club. His official debut was on 21 September against PAOK in Thessaloniki during a 2–1 win. He scored his first goal on 5 November in a 5–1 win over Chalkida. The 18-year-old forward instantly became a regular and a star a few weeks later, after an excellent display against local rivals Ethnikos Piraeus, where he scored two goals and was hailed as the new Olympiacos leader. The following months his manager Stjepan Bobek decided to switch him to midfield, despite criticism from a large part of the Greek press. It would soon prove a decision of tactical genius as Delikaris was able to flaunt his rare technical and organising skills, creating goal after goal.

==== 1970–71 ====
The next year saw a number of impressive performances of the young star, along with his debut with the national team in a 3-0 loss at Wembley against England. It also saw the start of his love-hate relationship with the club board, part of which was appointed (as for all teams) by the military regime in power during this troubled period for Greece. He was fined 5 thousand drachmas for staying out late before a game against arch-rivals Panathinaikos. That year he also switched his jersey number 11 for the number he is best remembered with, "10".

==== 1971–72 ====
The following season started with him doing his national service. This was to take its toll on the young player who was often sidelined due to exhaustion and injury by manager Alan Ashman. Part of the press started to question his loyalty to the side, followed by part of the club following. Though little is known of details, his life outside the football field continued to challenge the strict morals of the time and land him with fines and punishments, this time a lifetime ban from the national side, which would later be revoked. Even so, Delikaris did not cease to amaze with his footballing abilities, receiving flattering comments from foreign peers.

==== 1972–75 ====
During the 1972–73 pre-season, Delikaris was given the team's captaincy. Again though his appearances were inconsistent and his injuries frequent. He was later stripped of the captaincy, only to return after apologising to the chairman Nikolaos Goulandris (who was said to adore him), to a series of impressive performances which ended the year in success and a double for Olympiacos. The 1973-74 season was remembered for his catalytic performance in the side's largest ever win against Fostiras with 11-0, and the recapturing of the Championship with a record number of points and goals. While the following season he regained the captaincy and played an important part over the two legs, in the historic aggregate win over Celtic F.C. in the European Champions' Cup. In light of this The Times reported on his technical gifts, commenting that he was well aware of the secrets of football. He also impressed at the international level excelling against West Germany, while enthusiastic reporters hailed him as the only man to dribble Beckenbauer, who later acknowledged his talent. However the season was followed by unrest as Delikaris protested against the poor pay for the club's Greek players, while Goulandris resigned in protest for reasons unknown. On 26/3/75 Delikaris featured in a World's Best XI alongside other legends such as Johan Cruyff, Pele, Jairzinho and his teammate in Olympiacos Milton Viera against R.S.C. Anderlecht, in honor of the Belgian legend Paul Van Himst in an 8-3 loss. The team won the championship which was to be the last for a number of years, followed by news of Delikaris' departure, while he was rumoured to be in talks with Celtic.

==== 1975–78 ====
However, he did show up for the pre-season amongst his teammates' and fans' jubilation. The season saw him turn in some memorable performances both at club and international level. However the club's serious financial problems caused unrest. Even though in an open letter to the board he declared his willingness to play without pay due to his love of the side, there were constant hints by the press that his persistent injuries that year were due to financial causes rather than medical. In a late season game against PAOK, Delikaris took off his shirt and left in protest of his teammates' performance. Things went downhill from there. The following season saw him inexplicably receive his first red card which caused much protest, because Delikaris had actually been hit by an opponent without reply. Delikaris was well known for his clean footballing style. His relationship with teammates took a downward spiral and in late 1977 they asked for him to be stripped of his captaincy. Soon after he played his last game with Olympiacos against Kavala F.C. (January 8, 1978).

=== Panathinaikos ===
Then came the move that shook the foundations of Greek football at the time. Hated arch-rivals Panathinaikos announced the signing of Georgios Delikaris. However, he was never accepted by the fans of Panathinaikos and never seemed to come to terms with the switch himself, often acting out against teammates, managers and fans. In his first game against Olympiacos he had asked not to participate. After being asked to come on as a sub, he walked out of the ground while verbally showing his discontent. Another instance in a game against Olympiacos found him being cheered by Olympiacos fans. During the game, he was constantly engaged in amicable conversation with them, voicing his regret for joining the Athens side. One of his rare moments of glory at Panathinaikos saw him score a spectacular goal against Italian giants Juventus FC

=== Retirement ===
On October 19, 1981 Delikaris retired from professional football for reasons unknown to this day. During his career Delikaris was capped 32 times by the National Football Team of Greece scoring 7 goals.

=== The legend of Delikaris ===
Since 1981 Georgios Delikaris pulled himself away from the spotlight, seldom making a public appearance and stayed away from football. Little is known about the circumstances surrounding his departures from Olympiacos and Panathinaikos, and he himself chooses not reveal details. This has elevated him even more to legendary status with the spread of many unsubstantiated stories and anecdotes, relating to those periods as well as his life after football. It is known that he has faced serious financial strife at times and has been involved in the auto-trade business, had lost a large amount of money in the collapse of the Albanian economy in 1997, was the co-owner of a restaurant in his hometown neighborhood and was rumored as of 2009 to be a taxi-driver (though this has been denied by family members).

=== Reemergence ===
Delikaris reemerged in the spotlight after a number of years giving an informal interview to Greek newspaper Ta Nea (August 25, 1997). Amongst other things Delikaris admitted that it was a mistake to join Panathinaikos and that he was driven by certain enemies within Olympiacos to leave his favorite club, but refused to elaborate. At that time he was a partner in a restaurant. In 2004, he wrote a few articles for the sports newspaper Protathlitis and was said to attend an Olympiacos football game after a great number of years. He later attended an event (November 13, 2005) in his honor at the Olympiacos home ground merchandise store, during which he publicly apologised for moving to Panathinaikos.

=== Car accident ===
Delikaris was hospitalised in June 2009, having been injured in a car accident.

== Honours ==
Olympiacos

- Alpha Ethniki: 1972-73, 1973–74, 1974-75.
- Greek Cup: 1971, 1973, 1975, 1982
