= 1966–67 Greek Football Cup =

1966–67 Greek Cup
Tournament details
- Country: Greece

Final positions
- Champions: Panathinaikos (4th title)
- Runners-up: Panionios

Tournament statistics
- Top goal scorer(s): Kostas Nikolaidis; Andreas Michalopoulos (4 goals each)

The 1966–67 Greek Football Cup was the 25th edition of the Greek Football Cup. The competition culminated with the Greek Cup final held at AEK Stadium on 6 July 1967. The match was contested by Panathinaikos and Panionios, with Panathinaikos winning by 1–0.

== Calendar ==
From the last qualifying round onwards:

Round	Date(s)	Fixtures	Clubs	New entries
Last qualifying round	15 December 1966, 22–24 February & 3, 9 March 1967	15	49 → 33	33
Additional round	8 March 1967	0	33 → 32	none
Round of 32	14 May 1967	15	32 → 16	16
Round of 16	14 June 1967	7	16 → 8	none
Quarter-finals	25 June 1967	3	8 → 4	none
Semi-finals	1967	2	4 → 2	none
Final	6 July 1967	1	2 → 1	none

== Last qualifying round ==
Team 1	Score	Team 2
Athinaikos	2–1 (a.e.t.)	Agios Ierotheos
Atromitos	5–0	PAO Saframpoli
Rodiakos	2–0	Vyzas Megara
MENT	?	Ampelokipoi Thessaloniki
Fostiras	3–2	Attikos
Panelefsiniakos	2–0 (w/o)	Aiolikos
Paniliakos	3–2	Thyella Patra
Lamia	2–0	Olympiacos Chalkida
Arkadikos	0–1	Panegialios
Aspida Xanthi	2–0	Panserraikos
Aris	2–0	Elpida Kryoneri
Iraklis	2–1 (a.e.t.)	Pierikos
Niki Volos	1–0	Olympiacos Volos
Veria	3–2 (a.e.t.)	PAOK
Egaleo	2–3	Asteras Zografou
OFI	8–1	Minotauros

== Additional round ==
Team 1	Score	Team 2
PAS Giannina	2–0 (w/o)	Paniliakos

• The last 16 of previous season's Cup qualified for the 2nd round.

== Knockout phase ==
In the knockout phase, teams play against each other over a single match. If the match ends up as a draw, extra time will be played. If a winner doesn't occur after the extra time the winner emerges by a flip of a coin.
The mechanism of the draws for each round is as follows:

- In the draw for the round of 32, the teams that had qualified to previous' season Round of 16 are seeded and the clubs that passed the qualification round are unseeded.
- In the draws for the round of 16 onwards, there are no seedings, and teams from the same group can be drawn against each other.

== Bracket ==
Round of 32
Aspida Xanthi	2
Aris	1
AEK Athens	4
Athinaikos	0
Panathinaikos	2
Asteras Zografou	1
PAS Giannina	1
Ethnikos Piraeus	2
Olympiacos	3
Niki Volos	1
Chania	1
Proodeftiki	2
Trikala	4
Foinikas Polichni	1
Apollon Athens	6
Fostiras	0
OFI (w/o)	2
Panegialios	0
Lamia	2
Chalandri	1
Panionios	1
Atromitos	0
Kavala	2
Veria	0
Iraklis (a.e.t.)	2
Apollon Kalamarias	1
Rodiakos	0
Panelefsiniakos (c)	0
Panachaiki	4
Atromitos Piraeus	0
Ethnikos Pylaia (a.e.t.)	1
MENT	0

Round of 16
Aspida Xanthi	1
AEK Athens	5
Panathinaikos	3
Ethnikos Piraeus	0
Olympiacos	3
Proodeftiki	0
Trikala	1
Apollon Athens	3
OFI	3
Lamia	1
Panionios (w/o)	2
Kavala	0
Iraklis	1
Panelefsiniakos (a.e.t.)	2
Panachaiki	3
Ethnikos Pylaia	0

Quarter-finals
AEK Athens	1
Panathinaikos	2
Olympiacos	0
Apollon Athens	2
OFI	2
Panionios (c)	2
Panelefsiniakos (w/o)	2
Panachaiki	0

Semi-finals
Panathinaikos	2
Apollon Athens	1
Panionios	3
Panelefsiniakos	0

Final
Panathinaikos	1
Panionios	0

== Round of 32 ==
Team 1	Score	Team 2
Panionios	1–0	Atromitos
Apollon Athens	6–0	Fostiras
Panathinaikos	2–1	Asteras Zografou
PAS Giannina	1–2	Ethnikos Piraeus
AEK Athens	4–0	Athinaikos
Lamia	2–1	Chalandri
Panachaiki	4–0	Atromitos Piraeus
Rodiakos	0–0 (a.e.t.)^{*}	Panelefsiniakos
Chania	1–2	Proodeftiki
OFI	2–0 (w/o)	Panegialios
Olympiacos	3–1	Niki Volos
Trikala	4–1	Foinikas Polichni
Kavala	2–0	Veria
Aspida Xanthi	2–1	Aris
Ethnikos Pylaia	1–0 (a.e.t.)	MENT
Iraklis	2–1 (a.e.t.)	Apollon Kalamarias

^{*}Coin toss.

== Round of 16 ==
Team 1	Score	Team 2
Olympiacos	3–0	Proodeftiki
Panachaiki	3–0	Ethnikos Pylaia
Panathinaikos	3–0	Ethnikos Piraeus
Iraklis	1–2 (a.e.t.)	Panelefsiniakos
OFI	3–1	Lamia
Aspida Xanthi	1–5	AEK Athens
Panionios	2–0 (w/o)	Kavala
Trikala	1–3	Apollon Athens

== Quarter-finals ==
Team 1	Score	Team 2
Olympiacos	0–2	Apollon Athens
OFI	2–2 (a.e.t.)^{*}	Panionios
AEK Athens	1–2	Panathinaikos
Panelefsiniakos	2–0 (w/o)	Panachaiki

^{*}Coin toss.

== Semi-finals ==
Team 1	Score	Team 2
Panionios	3–0	Panelefsiniakos
Panathinaikos	2–1	Apollon Athens

== Final ==
6 July 1967

Panathinaikos	1–0	Panionios
Grammos 56'	Report (page 4)

AEK Stadium, Nea Filadelfia
Attendance: 28,000
Referee: Fulvio Pieroni (Italy)
