= Totis Filakouris =

Greek footballer

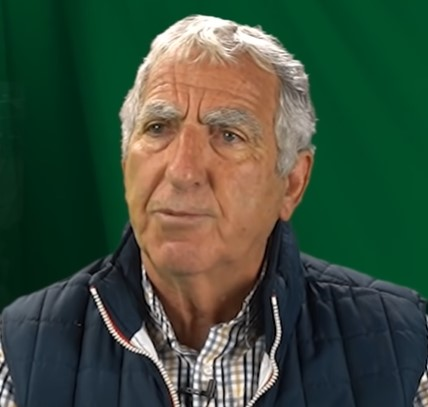
- Filakouris in 2021

Personal information
- Full name: Panagiotis Filakouris
- Date of birth: 1 March 1947 (age 79)
- Place of birth: Leros, Dodecanese, Kingdom of Italy under British Protectorate, now Greece
- Position: Forward

Senior career*
Years	Team	Apps	(Gls)
1965–1975	Panathinaikos	207	(17)
1975–1979	Ethnikos Piraeus	111	(17)
1979–1981	Egaleo		

Managerial career
- 1986–1993: Panachaiki (joint manager, credited)
- 1996–1997: Panachaiki (joint manager, credited)
- 2005: Panathinaikos (caretaker)
- 2021–2022: Aittitos Spata
- * Club domestic league appearances and goals

Panagiotis "Totis" Filakouris (Greek: Παναγιώτης "Τότης" Φυλακούρης; born 1 March 1947) is a Greek former footballer who played as a forward.

Fylakouris played for Panathinaikos for ten years from 1965 until 1975 and was a member of the team that played in the final of the European Cup of Champions in 1971 at Wembley Stadium. Late in his career he also had a stint with Ethnikos Piraeus.

After his career ended, Fylakouris coached Greek-American clubs in the US and was also coach for Panachaiki and interim coach for Panathinaikos in 2005. He is still popular to the fans of the green club.

== Personal life ==
His elder brother, Dimitris also played for Panathinaikos in the early 1960s.

== Honours ==
- Alpha Ethniki: 1964, 1969, 1970, 1972
- Greek Cup: 1967, 1969
