= Mitsos Dimitriou =

Greek footballer (1948–2002)

Personal information
- Full name: Dimitrios Dimitriou
- Date of birth: 20 January 1948
- Place of birth: Kingdom of Greece
- Date of death: 18 April 2002 (aged 54)
- Place of death: Greece
- Position: Defender

Senior career*
Years	Team	Apps	(Gls)
1967–1979	Panathinaikos	254	(37)

International career
1969–1975	Greece	12	(3)
- * Club domestic league appearances and goals

Dimitrios "Mitsos" Dimitriou (Greek: Δημήτριος "Μήτσος" Δημητρίου; 20 January 1948 – 18 April 2002) was a Greek football defender.

== Club career ==
Dimitriou played club football for Panathinaikos, appearing in 254 league matches in more than a decade with the club. He was runner-up at 1971 European Cup Final but he didn't play due to injury. He played at 1971 Intercontinental Cup. Dimitriou won 4 Greek championships (1969, 1970, 1972, 1977) and 2 Greek cups (1969, 1977).

== International career ==
Dimitriou made his debut for the Greece national football team on 16 November 1969, and made 12 total appearances for Greece.

== Honours ==
- Alpha Ethniki: 1969, 1970, 1972, 1977
- Greek Cup: 1969, 1977
