= Takis Ikonomopoulos =

Greek footballer (1943–2025)

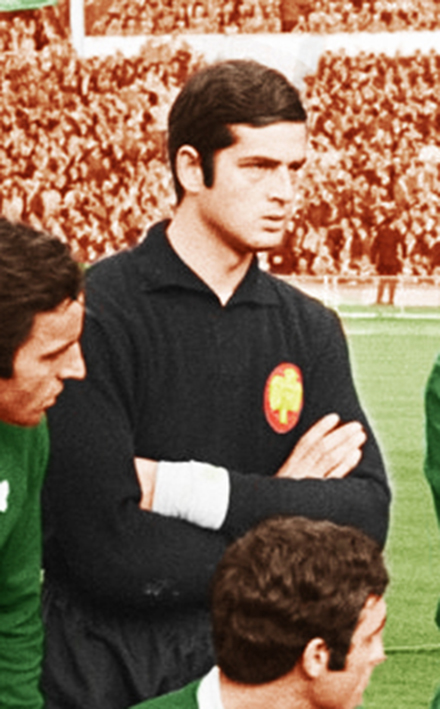
- Ikonomopoulos in 1971

Personal information
- Full name: Panagiotis Ikonomopoulos
- Date of birth: 19 October 1943
- Place of birth: Kallithea, Athens, German-occupied Greece
- Date of death: 10 February 2025 (aged 81)
- Place of death: Athens, Greece
- Position: Goalkeeper

Youth career
- 1959–1961: Kallithea

Senior career*
Years	Team	Apps	(Gls)
1961–1962	Apollon Athens		
1962–1963	Proodeftiki	18	(0)
1963–1976	Panathinaikos	303	(0)
1976–1977	Panachaiki	25	(0)
1977–1979	Apollon Athens	32	(0)

International career
1965–1974	Greece	25	(0)

Managerial career
- 2002: Panathinaikos (goalkeeping coach)
- * Club domestic league appearances and goals

Panagiotis "Takis" Ikonomopoulos (Greek: Παναγιώτης "Τάκης" Οικονομόπουλος; 19 October 1943 – 10 February 2025) was a Greek professional footballer who played as a goalkeeper, spending most of his career with Panathinaikos. He made 25 appearances for the Greece national team. He was nicknamed "The Bird" (Greek: "Το Πουλί") after his impressive dives he did during his career.

== Playing career ==
In 1963, a month after coach Stjepan Bobek arrived at Panathinaikos, Ikonomopoulos was transferred to the club from Proodeftiki.

While playing for Panathinaikos, he managed to not concede a single goal for 1,088 minutes (in a span of 13 consecutive games—a record for Greece which remains unbroken). The record spanned from 17 January 1965 until 9 May 1965. His record places him in spot number 19 in the World's Top Division Goalkeepers of all time with the longest time without conceding a goal (the second highest for Greece, ranking at world spot 38 is Vasilis Konstantinou of Panathinaikos who went 988 minutes without giving up a goal, from 30 December 1979 until 16 March 1980). He was a member of the squad that reached the 1971 European Cup Final. He played the whole European competition using the shirt of his idol José Ángel Iribar, legendary keeper nicknamed "El Txopo" from Athletic Bilbao and the Spanish national team, which he got from a Spain-Greece game in 1970.

Ikonomopoulos had set up a gym at home and used to put extra hours of training there. One of the boys who used to hang out and watch the bird train was Giannis Kyrastas.

Besides Proodeftiki and Panathinaikos, Ikonomopoulos also played for Panachaiki and Apollon Athens before he retired in 1979.

== Later life and death ==
After retiring as a football player, he went on to work with Panathinaikos as a goalkeeping coach.

In 2002, Takis Ikonomopoulos became responsible for coaching Panathinaikos' first team during the four last matches of the season—after coach Sergio Markarián had been barred from entering any stadium for 40 days following an incident with Olympiacos.

In 2017 he was appointed by the court as president of Panathinaikos A.O. He resigned on 13 January 2018.

Ikonomopoulos died from complications of a stroke 10 February 2025, at the age of 81.

== Honours ==
Panathinaikos

- Alpha Ethniki: 1963–64, 1964–65, 1968–69, 1969–70, 1971–72
- Greek Cup: 1966–67, 1968–69
