= Christos Michas =

Greek football referee (1933–2010)

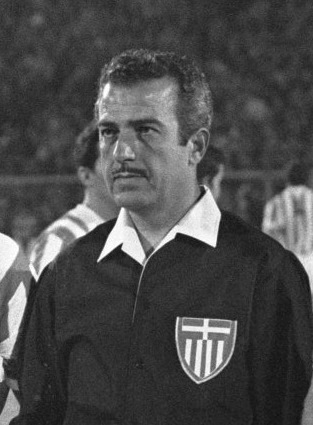
- Born: 1933; Greece
- Died: 25 August 2010 (aged 76–77)

Domestic
Years	League	Role
1967–1975	Alpha Ethniki	referee

International
Years	League	Role
1968–1973	UEFA	referee

Christos Michas (Greek: Χρήστος Μίχας; 1933 – 25 August 2010) was a Greek football referee who became the first Greek to officiate a European Cup final, the 1973 European Cup Winners' Cup Final. He belonged at the Athens association.

== Career ==
Michas worked several high-profile matches, including four consecutive Greek Cup finals from 1968 to 1972, before being selected for European competitions. His performance at the 1973 European Cup Winners' Cup Final was widely criticized, leading to an investigation. UEFA banned Michas from refereeing for life following the investigation.

In 2009, Richard Corbett, an MEP for Yorkshire and Humber petitioned UEFA for a reversal of AC Milan's victory over Leeds United in the 1973 final.
