= Nikos Gioutsos =

Greek footballer (1942–2023)

Personal information
- Full name: Nikolaos Gioutsos
- Date of birth: 16 April 1942
- Place of birth: Makrochori, Greece
- Date of death: 7 November 2023 (aged 81)
- Place of death: Athens, Greece
- Position: Striker

Senior career*
Years	Team	Apps	(Gls)
1960–1964	Csepel SC	36	(11)
1964–1974	Olympiacos	276	(100)
1974–1976	Ethnikos Piraeus	43	(2)
Total		355	(113)

International career
1965–1970	Greece	15	(6)

Managerial career
- 1994: Olympiacos (caretaker)
- * Club domestic league appearances and goals

Nikos Gioutsos (Greek: Νίκος Γιούτσος; 16 April 1942 – 7 November 2023) was a Greek footballer who played as a striker. From the special style of play and the passion together with the dynamism he brought to the matches, the fans shouted the slogan "Έμπαινε Γιούτσο" (Enter and destroy the opponents) which became a song and line in old Greek movies.

== Early life ==
Nikos Gioutsos was born in Makrochori on 16 April 1942. His family was slavophone. During the Greek Civil War, residents of Makrochori were supporting DSE and were bombed by EDES. After the death of 69 people, DSE's guerillas took 219 children from the village with their parents assent, and sent to Eastern Europe for protection. Gioutsos who was paternal orphan and his mother remarried, moved to Hungary along with his sister. They were living in a college which was similar to an orphanage in Belogiannis village.

== Career ==
Gioutsos started his football career with the amateur club Olympos which was formed by Greek refugees. In 1960 he transferred to Csepel SC. In 1964 he returned in Greece and he was playing for Olympiacos for ten years. During his tenure at Olympiacos he won the Greek championship in 1966, 1967, 1973, 1974 and the Greek Cup in 1964, 1968, 1971 and 1973. He ended his playing career for Ethnikos from 1974 to 1976.

== Post-playing career ==
After his retirement, he worked closely with Sokratis Kokkalis during the latter's first years at Olympiacos. In 1994, he was even named as interim coach for Olympiacos.

He was elected member of the city council of Piraeus in 2006.

== Death ==
Gioutsos died on 7 November 2023, at the age of 81. He was suffered by pulmonary edema
