= Aristidis Kamaras =

Greek footballer and lawyer

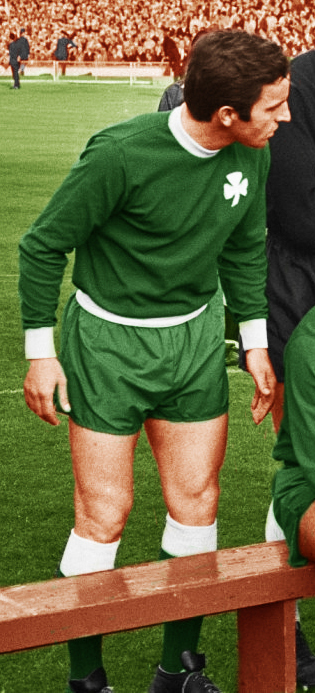
- Kamaras at the 1971 European Cup Final

Personal information
- Full name: Aristidis Katrodavlis
- Date of birth: 2 March 1939 (age 87)
- Position: Centre back

Senior career*
Years	Team	Apps	(Gls)
1954–1961	Apollon Athens	44	(2)
1961–1973	Panathinaikos	305	(18)
Total		359	(20)

International career
1960–1971	Greece	30	(1)
- * Club domestic league appearances and goals

Aristidis "Kamaras" Katrodavlis (Greek: Αριστείδης "Καμάρας" Κατροδαύλης; born 2 March 1939) is a retired Greek footballer and lawyer.

He started his career at Apollon Athens as a defender. His career at Apollon didn't last long as Panathinaikos picked him up at a young age in the Summer of 1961.

Kamaras played as a right back and a defensive midfielder for PAO for 12 years. He won 6 league titles with the "Greens" and was one of the key men that took PAO to the 1971 European Cup Final v. Ajax Amsterdam. He was the scorer of the 3rd vital goal which was to take PAO past Red Star Belgrade into the final. He also scored PAO'S lone goal in Belgrade that gave the team hope for the return leg after losing 4–1.

Kamaras also played for the National Football Team for 14 years (30 caps). He made his debut vs Denmark in 1960 in a friendly game Greece lost 7–2 in Copenhagen.

After retirement, he entered the legal profession full-time. He came back to football as President of Apollon Athens.

== Honours ==
Panathinaikos

- Alpha Ethniki: 1962, 1964, 1965, 1969, 1970, 1972
- Greek Cup: 1967, 1969
