= Frangiskos Sourpis =

Greek footballer

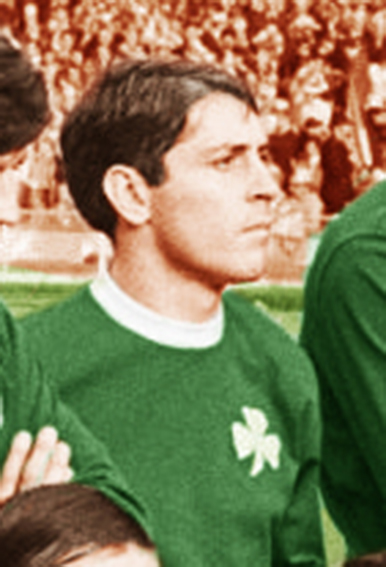
- Sourpis at the 1971 European Cup Final

Personal information
- Full name: Frangiskos Sourpis
- Date of birth: 4 March 1943 (age 83)
- Place of birth: Athens, German-occupied Greece
- Position: Centre back

Senior career*
Years	Team	Apps	(Gls)
1962–1973	Panathinaikos	310	(38)
Total		310	(38)

International career
1964–1967	Greece	6	(3)
- * Club domestic league appearances and goals

Frangiskos Sourpis (Greek: Φραγκίσκος Σούρπης; born 4 March 1943) is a former Greek footballer, centre-back for Panathinaikos from 1962 until 1973.

== Career ==
Born in Kifisia, Sourpis was talented at the pole vault and volleyball, but chose to play football with Panathinaikos F.C. He partnered Takis Papoulidis in the centre of defence in the 4-3-3 formation that coach Stjepan Bobek used at Panathinaikos. He played a total of 11 seasons for Panathinaikos, winning the Greek Alpha Ethniki six times (1962, 1964, 1965, 1969, 1970, 1972), two Greek Football Cups, and helped the club reach the 1971 European Cup Final.

Sourpis made four appearances for the full Greece national football team from 1964 to 1967.
