= Giannis Gaitatzis =

Greek footballer

Personal information
- Full name: Ioannis Gaitatzis
- Date of birth: 20 April 1944 (age 82)
- Place of birth: Xanthi, Greece
- Position: Defender

Senior career*
Years	Team	Apps	(Gls)
1962–1963	Orfeas Xanthi		
1963–1977	Olympiacos		

International career
1967–1971	Greece	15	(0)

Managerial career
- 1984: Lamia
- 1996–1998: Ialysos
- 1998–1999: Keratsini
- 2000–2001: Panelefsiniakos
- 2001: Acharnaikos
- 2002: Lamia
- 2004: Ethnikos Piraeus
- * Club domestic league appearances and goals

Giannis Gaitatzis (Greek: Γιάννης Γκαϊτατζής; 20 April 1944) is a retired Greek footballer who played as a defender and later manager.
