= 1972–73 AEK Athens F.C. season =

AEK Athens
1972–73 season
- Chairman: Kosmas Chatzicharalampous (until 7 March); Dimitrios Avramidis (until 15 May); Ioannis Theodorakopoulos
- Manager: Branko Stanković (until 7 February); Kostas Chatzimichail (interim, until 22 February); Billy Bingham
- Stadium: AEK Stadium
- Alpha Ethniki: 5th
- Greek Cup: Round of 16
- UEFA Cup: Second round
- Top goalscorer: League: Mimis Papaioannou; Giannis Dandelis; Kostas Nikolaidis (7 each); All: Kostas Nikolaidis (13)
- Highest home attendance: 29,812 vs Olympiacos (26 November 1972)
- Lowest home attendance: 2,292 vs Ethnikos Asteras (3 January 1973)
- Average home league attendance: 16,802
- Biggest win: AEK Athens 9–0 Ethnikos Asteras
- Biggest defeat: AEK Athens 1–5 Olympiacos
Home colours	Away colours

The 1972–73 season was the 49th season in the existence of AEK Athens F.C. and the 14th consecutive season in the top flight of Greek football. They competed in the Alpha Ethniki, the Greek Cup and the UEFA Cup. The season began on 13 September 1972 and finished on 3 June 1973.

== Kits ==
Home	Away

== Overview ==
The declining course of AEK Athens continued. However, prominent players such as Petros Ravousis, Tasos Konstantinou and Dionysis Tsamis were acquired. On the other hand, the arrival of dubious value of Latin American footballers, according to the current of the time, such as Néstor Errea, Rodolfo Vicente and Hugo Zeer did not offer anything special to the problematic performance of the club. Among the departures were players with many years of service, such as Giorgos Kefalidis and Stelios Skevofilakas, who moved to Atromitos, Panagiotis Ventouris who went to Cyprus, Andreas Papaemmanouil who retired, but most importantly, Stelios Serafidis who also retired after 19 years at the yellow-blacks.

AEK competed in the UEFA Cup for the first time in their history. In the first round, they were drawn against the Hungarian Salgótarján. It was characteristic, that the two matches against AEK constitute the whole of the European presence in Salgótarján's history. In the first leg at Nea Filadelfeia, AEK prevailed easily with 3–1. The rematch in Hungary had acquired a purely procedural character and the yellow-blacks qualified with a 1–1 draw. In the second round, luck completely turned its back on AEK, bringing them against Liverpool of Bill Shankly. The first match on Anfield, the superiority of Liverpool was certified, as the reds took the victory with 3–0 and largely ensured the qualification for the next round. In the rematch of AEK Stadium, Liverpool finished the job with a 3–1 win, which sent them to the next round and in the eventual conquest of the title, at the end of the season.

For another year AEK stayed away from claiming the Cup. In the first round, they eliminated Korinthos at home and in the round of 32, they overcame Ethnikos Asteras, with an impressive 9–0 home win. At the round of 16, AEK were drawn against the second division club Apollon Kalamarias and were eliminated with a 2–1 defeat at Kalamaria. That resulted in the removal of Branko Stanković from the bench of the team, after 5 years at the club.

After a period with the manager of the reserve team, Kostas Chatzimichail at the wheel, Billy Bingham, the manager of the national team, was hired in February at a difficult turn for the club, which was plagued by administrative and competitive problems. AEK were far from the top and the Irishman failed to change the situation and was fired at the end of the season. As a result, the club finished fifth, at a distance of 23 points from the top. The counterproductive attack of AEK in contrast to their long tradition in this section, was remarkable, as they scored only 39 goals while conceding 36.

== Management team ==
Position	Staff
Manager	(England) Billy Bingham
Assistant manager	(Greece) Kostas Chatzimichail
Academy director	(Greece) Georgios Daispangos
Academy manager	(Greece) Georgios Daispangos

== Players ==
=== Squad information ===
NOTE: The players are the ones that have been announced by the AEK Athens' press release. No edits should be made unless a player arrival or exit is announced. Updated 3 June 1973, 23:59 UTC+2.

Player	Nat.	Position(s)	Date of birth (Age)	Signed	Previous club	Transfer fee	Contract until
Goalkeepers
Néstor Errea	(Argentina)	GK	27 April 1939 (aged 34)	1972	(Argentina) Banfield	Free	1975
Stelios Konstantinidis	(Greece)	GK	6 June 1947 (aged 26)	1967	(Greece) AEK Athens U20	—	1976
Lakis Stergioudas	(Greece)	GK	11 December 1952 (aged 20)	1972	(Greece) Niki Polygyros	₯36,000	1981
Defenders
Giorgos Tanidis	(Greece)	CB	25 December 1946 (aged 26)	1971	(Greece) Aris Ptolemaida	₯120,000	1979
Rizos Lellis	(Greece)	CB / LB	13 November 1947 (aged 25)	1972	(Greece) AEL	₯1,200,000	1980
Apostolos Toskas	(Greece)	CB	28 December 1947 (aged 25)	1969	(Greece) Trikala	₯1,500,000	1977
Nikos Karapoulitidis	(Greece)	LB / RB / CB	30 November 1948 (aged 24)	1968	(Greece) AEK Athens U20	—	1976
Stefanos Theodoridis	(Greece)	RB / LB / CB / RM / LM	19 June 1950 (aged 23)	1969	(Greece) AEK Athens U20	—	1977
Kostas Triantafyllou	(Greece)	CB / RB / LB / DM	1950 (aged 22–23)	1969	(Greece) AEK Athens U20	—	1977
Lefteris Istorios	(Greece)	RB / LB / CM / DM	2 October 1951 (aged 21)	1971	(Greece) AEK Athens U20	—	1979
Petros Ravousis	(Greece)	CB / RB	1 October 1954 (aged 18)	1972	(Greece) Aetos Skydra	Free	1981
Midfielders
Nikos Stathopoulos	(Greece)	LM / LB / CM	8 November 1943 (aged 29)	1966	(Greece) AEK Athens U20	—	1976
Hugo Horacio Zerr	(Argentina)	CM / AM	13 November 1946 (aged 26)	1972	(Argentina) Argentinos Juniors	Free	1974
Giorgos Karafeskos	(Greece)	CM / DM / RM / RW	8 December 1946 (aged 26)	1965	(Greece) AEK Athens U20	—	1976
Giorgos Lavaridis	(Greece)	CM / DM / CB	15 October 1947 (aged 25)	1968	(Greece) AEK Athens U20	—	1976
Dionysis Tsamis	(Greece)	CM / DM / AM	17 October 1951 (aged 21)	1972	(Greece) Panetolikos	₯2,350,000	1981
Vangelis Makos	(Greece)	LM / LW	18 January 1952 (aged 21)	1972	(Greece) Thriamvos Athens	Free	1980
Forwards
Mimis Papaioannou (Captain)	(Greece)	SS / ST / AM / RW	17 November 1942 (aged 30)	1962	(Greece) Veria	₯175,000	1976
Spyros Pomonis (Vice-captain)	(Greece)	LW / LM	12 February 1944 (aged 29)	1960	(Greece) AEK Athens U20	—	1976
Kostas Nikolaidis	(Greece)	RW / LW / SS / ST	10 September 1944 (aged 28)	1965	(Greece) PAO Safraboli	₯400,000	1976
Giannis Dandelis	(Greece)	ST	31 May 1945 (aged 28)	1972	(Greece) Veria	₯540,000	1980
Rodolfo Vicente	(Argentina)	RW / RM	21 July 1946 (aged 26)	1972	(Argentina) Atlanta	Free	1974
Babis Psimogiannos	(Greece)	ST	13 August 1947 (aged 25)	1971	(Greece) Aris Agios Konstantinos	Free	1979
Lakis Nikolaou	(Greece)	ST / RW / CB / RB	17 July 1949 (aged 23)	1971	(Greece) Atromitos	₯600,000	1979
Tasos Konstantinou	(Cyprus)	RW / SS / ST / RM / AM	11 March 1951 (aged 22)	1972	(Cyprus) EPA Larnaca	₯600,000	1980
Stefanos Karypidis	(Greece)	RW / ST / RM	1955 (aged 17–18)	1972	(Greece) AEK Athens U20	—	1981

== Transfers ==
=== In ===
Pos.	Player	From	Fee	Date	Contract Until	Source
GK	(Argentina) Néstor Errea	(Argentina) Banfield	Free transfer	1 July 1972	30 June 1975	
GK	(Greece) Lakis Stergioudas	(Greece) Niki Polygyros	₯36,000	27 July 1972	30 June 1981	
DF	(Greece) Rizos Lellis	(Greece) AEL	₯1,200,000	6 July 1972	30 June 1980	
DF	(Greece) Petros Ravousis	(Greece) Aetos Skydra	Free transfer	18 July 1972	30 June 1981	
MF	(Argentina) Hugo Horacio Zerr	(Argentina) Argentinos Juniors	Free transfer	19 July 1972	30 June 1974	
MF	(Greece) Dionysis Tsamis	(Greece) Panetolikos	₯2,350,000	19 October 1972	30 June 1981	
MF	(Greece) Vangelis Makos	(Greece) Thriamvos Athens	Free transfer	15 July 1972	30 June 1980	
FW	(Argentina) Rodolfo Vicente	(Argentina) Atlanta	Free transfer	19 July 1972	30 June 1974	
FW	(Cyprus) Tasos Konstantinou	(Cyprus) EPA Larnaca	₯600,000	26 July 1972	30 June 1980	
FW	(Greece) Stefanos Karypidis	(Greece) AEK Athens U20	Promotion	20 November 1972	30 June 1981	
FW	(Greece) Giannis Dandelis	(Greece) Veria	₯540,000^{[a]}	30 June 1972	30 June 1980	
FW	(Greece) Dimitris Palasidis	(Greece) AO Koropi	Loan return	1 July 1972	30 June 1974	

a. plus Dimitris Palasidis as exchange and the incomes of a friendly between the two clubs.

=== Out ===
Pos.	Player	To	Fee	Date	Source
GK	(Greece) Stelios Serafidis	Retired		31 July 1972	
GK	(Greece) Kostas Silivistras	(Greece) Kallithea	Contract termination	31 July 1972	
DF	(Greece) Giorgos Kefalidis	(Greece) Atromitos	Contract termination	1 August 1972	
MF	(Greece) Stelios Skevofilakas	(Greece) Atromitos	Contract termination	1 August 1972	
MF	(Greece) Panagiotis Ventouris	(Cyprus) Anorthosis Famagusta	Free transfer	22 July 1972	
FW	(Greece) Andreas Papaemmanouil	Retired		31 July 1972	
FW	(Greece) Dimitris Palasidis	(Greece) Veria	Free transfer	30 June 1972	

=== Loan out ===
Pos.	Player	To	Fee	Date	Until	Option to buy	Source
FW	(Greece) Giorgos Kachris	(Greece) Atromitos	Free	26 July 1972	30 June 1973	✗	
FW	(Greece) Kostas Chanios	(Greece) Atromitos	Free	26 July 1972	30 June 1973	✗	

=== Overall transfer activity ===
Expenditure: ▼ ₯4,726,000

Income: ▲ ₯0

Net Total: ▼ ₯4,726,000

== Pre-season and friendlies ==
30 July 1972 Friendly	Edessaikos	0–3	AEK Athens	Edessa
17:00 EET (UTC+2)		Report	Dandelis 40'; Nikolaidis 41'; Konstantinou 80'	Stadium: Municipal Stadium of Edessa; Attendance: 3,000; Referee: Efthymiou

2 August 1972 Friendly	Kastoria	0–2	AEK Athens	Kastoria
		Report	Nikolaidis 70'; Theodoridis 75'	Stadium: Municipal Stadium of Kastoria; Attendance: 1,922; Referee: Manolis Vardakas (Kozani)

4 August 1972 Friendly	Makedonikos Siatista	0–7	AEK Athens	Siatista
		Report	Konstantinou 5'; Theodoridis 40'; Pomonis 43', 76', 88'; Nikolaidis 44'; Dandelis 67'	Stadium: Siatista Municipal Stadium

14 August 1972 Friendly	AEK Athens	3–2	Colombia	Nea Filadelfeia
21:30 EET (UTC+2)	Konstantinou 11'; Pomonis 78'; Dandelis 85'	Report	Morón 17'; Santamaría (red card) 58'; Tanidis 89' (o.g.)	Stadium: AEK Stadium; Attendance: 25,000; Referee: Stathis Papavasiliou (Piraeus)

19 August 1972 Friendly	AEK Athens	2–1	Egaleo	Nea Filadelfeia
20:30 EET (UTC+2)	Nikolaidis 23' (pen.); Pomonis 86'	Report	Martinos 19'	Stadium: AEK Stadium; Attendance: 9,346; Referee: Konstantinos Sfyrlas (Athens)

24 August 1972 Friendly	AEK Athens	1–1	Racing White	Nea Filadelfeia
21:30 EET (UTC+2)	Psimogiannos 35'	Report	Crombez (red card) 38'; Teugels 58'	Stadium: AEK Stadium; Attendance: 6,229; Referee: Thomas Kaladamis (Athens)
Note: At the 6th minute the floodlights malfunctioned and the match was suspended for 5 minutes.

26 August 1972 Friendly	Olympiacos	2–0	AEK Athens	Piraeus
21:00 EET (UTC+2)	Vasilopoulos 76'; Papadimitriou 83'	Report		Stadium: Karaiskakis Stadium; Attendance: 28,223; Referee: Dimitris Protonotarios (Athens)

30 August 1972 Friendly	AEK Athens	3–0	Atromitos	Nea Filadelfeia
21:30 EET (UTC+2)	Zerr 47'; Konstantinou 50'; Karafeskos 75'	Report		Stadium: AEK Stadium; Attendance: 10,000; Referee: Christos Karasoulas (Athens)

6 September 1972 Friendly	AEK Athens	1–0	Komlói Bányász	Nea Filadelfeia
21:00 EET (UTC+2)	Papaioannou 40'	Report		Stadium: AEK Stadium; Attendance: 12,000; Referee: Makris (Athens)

8 September 1972 Friendly	AEK Athens	5–0	AEL	Nea Filadelfeia
21:00 EET (UTC+2)	Nikolaidis 29', 36'; Papaioannou 43'; Pomonis 82'; Zerr 89'	Report		Stadium: AEK Stadium; Attendance: 6,000; Referee: Giorgos Abatzoglou (Athens)
Note: Friendly match as part of the transfer of Rizos Lellis.

18 October 1972 Friendly	AEK Athens	1–1	Greece	Nea Filadelfeia
14:30 EET (UTC+2)	Konstantinou 76'	Report	Papaioannou 60'	Stadium: AEK Stadium; Referee: Kastanos (Athens)
Note: Apostolos Toskas, Spyros Pomonis and Mimis Papaioannou competed with Greece against their team. Due to the absence of the manager of Greece, Billy Bingham, his assistant Alketas Panagoulias sat on the bench in his place.

7 March 1973 Friendly	Rodos	1–1	AEK Athens	Rhodes
15:30 EET (UTC+2)	Kottis 80'	Report	Nikolaou 57'	Stadium: Diagoras Stadium; Attendance: 5,000; Referee: Kostas Xanthos (Dodecanese)

18 April 1973 Friendly	Acharnaikos	0–2	AEK Athens	Acharnes
16:30 EET (UTC+2)		Report	Tanidis 80'; Nikolaou 85'	Stadium: Acharnes Stadium; Attendance: 1,000; Referee: Kostas Chatzimichail

26 April 1973 Friendly	AEK Athens	9–1	Aris Agios Konstantinos	Nea Filadelfeia
16:30 EET (UTC+2)	Nikolaidis 30'; Dandelis 32', 40'; Nikolaou 45', 65', 82'; Psimogiannos 75', 85'; Tsamis 80'	Report	Zervas 50'	Stadium: AEK Stadium; Attendance: 1,000; Referee: Kostas Chatzimichail

16 May 1973 Friendly	Asteras Keratsini	0–1	AEK Athens	Nikaia
16:30 EET (UTC+2)		Report	Papadopoulos 70'	Stadium: Neapoli Municipal Stadium; Attendance: 1,000; Referee: Gerazotis

7 June 1973 Friendly	AEK Athens	1–1	Argonaftis Piraeus	Nea Filadelfeia
17:30 EET (UTC+2)	Konstantinou 50'	Report	Xanthopoulos 65'	Stadium: AEK Stadium; Attendance: 1,000; Referee: Konstantinos Sfyrlas (Athens)
Note: Since AEK had no manager at the time, Kostas Chatzimichail was at the bench of the club.

10 June 1973 Friendly	PAOK	1–0	AEK Athens	Thessaloniki
20:30 EET (UTC+2)	Paridis (penalty missed) 26', 54'	Report		Stadium: Toumba Stadium; Attendance: 7,653; Referee: A. Triantafyllidis
Note: Since AEK had no manager at the time, Kostas Chatzimichail was at the bench of the club.

16 June 1973 Friendly	Panathinaikos	4–1	AEK Athens	Ampelokipoi
20:45 EET (UTC+2)	Dimitriou 17'; Domazos 20', 58'; Antoniadis 54'	Report	Nikolaou 37'	Stadium: Leoforos Alexandras Stadium; Attendance: 12,380; Referee: Karystinos
Note: Since AEK had no manager at the time, Kostas Chatzimichail was at the bench of the club.

=== OPAP Summer Championship ===
2 July 1972 1	Olympiacos	1–1	AEK Athens	Piraeus
20:30 EET (UTC+2)	Forakis 13'	Report	S. Karypidis 52'	Stadium: Karaiskakis Stadium; Attendance: 2,500; Referee: Nanos
Note: The squad of AEK Athens was consisted entirely by amateur footballers.

9 July 1972 2	AEK Athens	3–0	Panathinaikos	Nea Ionia
17:30 EET (UTC+2)	Kolovos 6', 30'; S. Karypidis 73'	Report		Stadium: Municipal Stadium of Nea Ionia; Attendance: 700; Referee: Christos Dilzas (Thessaloniki)
Note: The squads of both clubs were consisted entirely by amateur footballers.

16 July 1972 3	AEK Athens	0–2	Ethnikos Piraeus	Nea Ionia
17:30 EET (UTC+2)		Report	Zervoudakis 69', 80'	Stadium: Municipal Stadium of Nea Ionia; Attendance: 348; Referee: Giannis Adamakis (Chalkida)
Note: The squad of AEK Athens was consisted entirely by amateur footballers.

23 July 1972 4	Panachaiki	2–0	AEK Athens	Patras
17:30 EET (UTC+2)	Ioakeimidis 7'; Leventakos 8'	Report		Stadium: Panachaiki Stadium; Attendance: 1,137; Referee: Dimitris Sarakinos (Messinia)
Note: The squad of AEK Athens was consisted entirely by amateur footballers.

30 July 1972 5	Panionios	0–0	AEK Athens	Tavros
17:30 EET (UTC+2)		Report		Stadium: Tavros Stadium; Referee: Charalampos Tsagarousianos (Patras)
Note: The squads of both clubs were consisted entirely by amateur footballers, since the pre-season of the men's teams had already started.

6 August 1972 6	AEK Athens	1–1	Olympiacos	Nea Ionia
17:15 EET (UTC+2)	Kolovos 67'	Report	Venetis 60'	Stadium: Municipal Stadium of Nea Ionia; Referee: Leonidas Panagopoulos (Athens)
Note: The squads of both clubs were consisted entirely by amateur footballers, since the pre-season of the men's teams had already started.

13 August 1972 7	Panathinaikos	1–3	AEK Athens	Chalandri
17:15 EET (UTC+2)	Livathinos 60'; Bakis (red card) 80'	Report	Kolovos 16', 29'; Keskenidis (red card) 80'; S. Karypidis 85'	Stadium: Chalandri Municipal Stadium; Referee: Kanakaris
Note: The squads of both clubs were consisted entirely by amateur footballers, since the pre-season of the men's teams had already started.

20 August 1972 8	Ethnikos Piraeus	2–0	AEK Athens	Piraeus
17:00 EET (UTC+2)	Michailidis 57'; Oikonomou 81'	Report		Stadium: Karaiskakis Stadium; Attendance: 2,000; Referee: Giannis Adamakis (Chalkida)

27 August 1972 9	AEK Athens	1–1	Panachaiki	Nea Ionia
17:00 EET (UTC+2)	Margetoulis 27'	Report	Margaritis 72'	Stadium: Municipal Stadium of Nea Ionia; Referee: Goudas (Piraeus)

3 September 1972 10	AEK Athens	3–1	Panionios	Nea Ionia
16:45 EET (UTC+2)	S. Karypidis 49', 75'; Tsardidis 69'	Report	Kalogeropoulos 66'	Stadium: Municipal Stadium of Nea Ionia; Referee: Lianos

== Competitions ==
=== Overall record ===
Competition	First match	Last match	Starting round	Final position	Record							
Competition	First match	Last match	Starting round	Final position	Pld	W	D	L	GF	GA	GD	Win %
Alpha Ethniki	17 September 1972	3 June 1973	Matchday 1	5th	34	13	11	10	39	36	+3	38.24
Greek Cup	15 October 1972	7 February 1973	First round	Round of 16	3	2	0	1	12	2	+10	66.67
UEFA Cup	13 September 1972	7 November 1972	First round	Second round	4	1	1	2	5	8	−3	25.00
Total					41	16	12	13	56	46	+10	39.02

Last updated: 3 June 1973
Source: Competitions

=== Alpha Ethniki ===
==== League table ====
Pos	Team	Pld	W	D	L	GF	GA	GD	Pts	Qualification or relegation
3	Panathinaikos (Note: Panathinaikos were deducted 3 points and had 3 games penalty.)	34	22	7	5	89	29	+60	82	Qualification for UEFA Cup first round
4	Panachaiki	34	16	12	6	42	27	+15	78	Qualification for UEFA Cup first round
5	AEK Athens	34	13	11	10	39	36	+3	71	
6	Ethnikos Piraeus	34	10	15	9	35	32	+3	69	
7	Panionios	34	13	9	12	41	39	+2	69	

Source: RSSSF
Rules for classification: 1st points; 2nd decision match; 3rd head-to-head goal difference.

==== Results summary ====
Overall								Home						Away					
Pld	W	D	L	GF	GA	GD	Pts	W	D	L	GF	GA	GD	W	D	L	GF	GA	GD
34	13	11	10	39	36	+3	71	10	4	3	26	16	+10	3	7	7	13	20	−7

Source: Competitive matches

==== Results by Matchday ====
Round	1	2	3	4	5	6	7	8	9	10	11	12	13	14	15	16	17	18	19	20	21	22	23	24	25	26	27	28	29	30	31	32	33	34
Ground	A	H	A	H	A	H	A	A	H	A	H	A	H	A	H	H	A	H	A	H	A	H	A	H	H	A	H	A	H	A	H	A	A	H
Result	W	W	D	D	D	W	W	D	L	D	W	L	W	D	W	W	D	D	L	W	L	W	L	W	W	L	L	W	L	D	D	L	L	D
Position	4	4	4	3	6	4	4	5	5	5	4	6	6	5	5	4	4	4	5	5	5	5	5	5	5	5	5	5	5	5	5	5	5	5

Source: Competitive matches
A = Away; H = Home; W = Win; D = Draw; L = Loss; P = Postponed

==== Matches ====
17 September 1972 1	Kavala	0–1	AEK Athens	Kavala
16:15 EET (UTC+2)			Papaioannou 39'	Stadium: Kavala National Stadium; Attendance: 12,174; Referee: Pan Marinos (Piraeus)

24 September 1972 2	AEK Athens	2–1	Panserraikos	Nea Filadelfeia
16:15 EET (UTC+2)	Karafeskos 19'; Pomonis 71'		Tsirikas 50'	Stadium: AEK Stadium; Attendance: 21,134; Referee: Pyloridis

1 October 1972 3	Kalamata	0–0	AEK Athens	Kalamata
15:30 EET (UTC+2)				Stadium: Messiniakos Stadium; Attendance: 9,200; Referee: Dionysis Voulgaris (Athens)

8 October 1972 4	AEK Athens	0–0	Panionios	Nea Filadelfeia
15:30 EET (UTC+2)				Stadium: AEK Stadium; Attendance: 27,953; Referee: Karkatsoulis (Thessaloniki)

6 December 1972 5	Olympiacos Volos	1–1	AEK Athens	Volos
14:15 EET (UTC+2)	Karaiskos 90+2' (pen.)		Nikolaidis 80' (pen.)	Stadium: Volos Municipal Stadium; Attendance: 2,525; Referee: Dionysis Voulgaris (Athens)

29 October 1972 6	AEK Athens	3–1	Aris	Nea Filadelfeia
15:00 EET (UTC+2)	Papaioannou 50'; Dandelis 60'; Psimogiannos 68'		Kokkoris 41'	Stadium: AEK Stadium; Attendance: 20,840; Referee: Dimitris Protonotarios (Athens)

20 December 1972 7	Omonia	2–4	AEK Athens	Nicosia
	Kaiafas 27'; Frățilă 59'		Nikolaou 17'; Nikolaidis 19'; Vicente 64'; Lavaridis 83'	Stadium: GSP Stadium; Attendance: 7,000; Referee: Stathis Papavasiliou (Piraeus)

12 November 1972 8	Trikala	0–0	AEK Athens	Trikala
15:00 EET (UTC+2)				Stadium: Trikala Municipal Stadium; Attendance: 6,459; Referee: Giannakos (Macedonia)

26 November 1972 9	AEK Athens	1–5	Olympiacos	Nea Filadelfeia
15:00 EET (UTC+2)	Nikolaidis 58' (pen.)		Triantafyllos 35'; Argyroudis 48'; Delikaris 50'; Gioutsos 55'; Synetopoulos 60', (red card) 70'	Stadium: AEK Stadium; Attendance: 29,812; Referee: Nikos Zlatanos (Thessaloniki)

3 December 1972 10	PAOK	0–0	AEK Athens	Thessaloniki
14:45 EET (UTC+2)				Stadium: Toumba Stadium; Attendance: 39,954; Referee: Pan Marinos (Piraeus)

10 December 1972 11	AEK Athens	1–0	Egaleo	Nea Filadelfeia
14:45 EET (UTC+2)	Nikolaidis 40' (pen.)			Stadium: AEK Stadium; Attendance: 14,407; Referee: Stathis Papavasiliou (Piraeus)

17 December 1972 12	Panathinaikos	3–1	AEK Athens	Ampelokipoi
14:45 EET (UTC+2)	Antoniadis 10', 45', 77'		Dandelis 62'	Stadium: Leoforos Alexandras Stadium; Attendance: 24,760; Referee: Timoleon Latsios (Larissa)

24 December 1972 13	AEK Athens	1–0	Ethnikos Piraeus	Nea Filadelfeia
14:45 EET (UTC+2)	Nikolaidis 4'		Kritikopoulos (red card) 84'	Stadium: AEK Stadium; Attendance: 11,206; Referee: Giorgos Armodoros (Piraeus)

31 December 1972 14	Iraklis	1–1	AEK Athens	Thessaloniki
14:45 EET (UTC+2)	Gesios 7'		Papaioannou 2'	Stadium: Kaftanzoglio Stadium; Attendance: 8,896; Referee: Eleftheriadis (Athens)

7 January 1973 15	AEK Athens	1–0	Atromitos	Nea Filadelfeia
14:45 EET (UTC+2)	Papaioannou 1'			Stadium: AEK Stadium; Attendance: 14,883; Referee: Theodorou (Athens)

21 January 1973 16	AEK Athens	3–0	Fostiras	Nea Filadelfeia
14:45 EET (UTC+2)	Dandelis 3', 43', 80'		Rellis (red card) 80'	Stadium: AEK Stadium; Attendance: 16,901; Referee: Theodoros Tsanaklidis (Kavala)

28 January 1973 17	Panachaiki	1–1	AEK Athens	Patras
15:00 EET (UTC+2)	Michalopoulos 39'		Nikolaou 87'	Stadium: Panachaiki Stadium; Attendance: 9,395; Referee: Nikos Zlatanos (Thessaloniki)

4 February 1973 18	AEK Athens	1–1	Kavala	Nea Filadelfeia
15:00 EET (UTC+2)	Pomonis 85'		Papadopoulos 3'	Stadium: AEK Stadium; Attendance: 15,005; Referee: Anthis

11 February 1973 19	Panserraikos	2–0	AEK Athens	Serres
15:00 EET (UTC+2)	Seizis 27'; Kokkinos 70'			Stadium: Serres Municipal Stadium; Attendance: 5,011; Referee: Martinis (Thessaloniki)

25 February 1973 20	AEK Athens	2–0	Kalamata	Nea Filadelfeia
15:30 EET (UTC+2)	Papaioannou 12'; Psimogiannos 55'			Stadium: AEK Stadium; Attendance: 16,452; Referee: Kostas Krikonis (Epirus)

4 March 1973 21	Panionios	2–1	AEK Athens	Nea Smyrni
16:00 EET (UTC+2)	Toskas 45' (o.g.); Dedes 60'		Psimogiannos 18'	Stadium: Nea Smyrni Stadium; Attendance: 14,423; Referee: Christos Kougias (Athens)

11 March 1973 22	AEK Athens	2–0	Olympiacos Volos	Nea Filadelfeia
16:00 EET (UTC+2)	Nikolaidis 32'; Papaioannou 69'			Stadium: AEK Stadium; Attendance: 8,316; Referee: Makris (Athens)

18 March 1973 23	Aris	2–0	AEK Athens	Thessaloniki
16:30 EET (UTC+2)	Kapernekas 57', 75'			Stadium: Aris Stadium; Attendance: 8,021; Referee: Margaritis Doumousiadis (Magnesia)

26 March 1973 24	AEK Athens	1–0	Omonia	Nea Filadelfeia
14:30 EET (UTC+2)	Nikolaou 35'			Stadium: AEK Stadium; Attendance: 5,504; Referee: Pan Marinos (Piraeus)

1 April 1973 25	AEK Athens	5–1	Trikala	Nea Filadelfeia
16:30 EET (UTC+2)	Psimogiannos 18', 55'; Nikolaidis 24' (pen.); Papaioannou 70'; Nikolaou 77'		Sinatkas 30'	Stadium: AEK Stadium; Attendance: 14,340; Referee: Giorgos Abatzoglou (Athens)

8 April 1973 26	Olympiacos	2–0	AEK Athens	Piraeus
16:30 EET (UTC+2)	Argyroudis 55'; Triantafyllos 57'			Stadium: Karaiskakis Stadium; Attendance: 41,049; Referee: Nikos Zlatanos (Thessaloniki)

15 April 1973 27	AEK Athens	0–2	PAOK	Nea Filadelfeia
16:30 EET (UTC+2)			Sarafis 48'; Apostolidis 52'	Stadium: AEK Stadium; Attendance: 29,654; Referee: Leonidas Vamvakopoulos (Athens)

22 April 1973 28	Egaleo	1–2	AEK Athens	Aigaleo
16:30 EET (UTC+2)	Rellakis 79'		Lellis 35'; Dandelis 89'	Stadium: Stavros Mavrothalassitis Stadium; Attendance: 8,504; Referee: Dimitris Protonotarios (Athens)

30 April 1973 29	AEK Athens	0–2	Panathinaikos	Nea Filadelfeia
			Verón (yellow card) 44', (goal) 68'; Antoniadis 72'	Stadium: AEK Stadium; Attendance: 25,042; Referee: Christos Michas (Athens)

6 May 1973 30	Ethnikos Piraeus	0–0	AEK Athens	Piraeus
17:00 EET (UTC+2)				Stadium: Karaiskakis Stadium; Attendance: 7,777; Referee: Pyloridis

13 May 1973 31	AEK Athens	2–2	Iraklis	Nea Filadelfeia
17:00 EET (UTC+2)	Psimogiannos 19'; Nikolaou 65'		Batakis 4'; Koutroubelis 72'	Stadium: AEK Stadium; Attendance: 8,964; Referee: Kanakaris

20 May 1973 32	Atromitos	1–0	AEK Athens	Peristeri
	Misailidis 61'			Stadium: Peristeri Stadium; Attendance: 6,221; Referee: Kostas Levogiannis (Athens)

27 May 1973 33	Fostiras	2–1	AEK Athens	Tavros
17:30 EET (UTC+2)	Panopoulos 31'; Gerakis 86'		Dandelis 55'; Tanidis (red card) 86'	Stadium: Tavros Stadium; Attendance: 4,091; Referee: Moniakis (Heraklion)

3 June 1973 34	AEK Athens	1–1	Panachaiki	Nea Filadelfeia
17:30 EET (UTC+2)	Lavaridis 62'		Davourlis 52'	Stadium: AEK Stadium; Attendance: 10,208; Referee: Christos Mittas (Thessaloniki)

=== Greek Cup ===
==== Matches ====
15 October 1972 First round	AEK Athens	2–0	Korinthos	Nea Filadelfeia
15:00 EET (UTC+2)	Dandelis 73'; Pomonis 76'			Stadium: AEK Stadium; Attendance: 7,804; Referee: Christos Kougias (Athens)

3 January 1973 Round of 32	AEK Athens	9–0	Ethnikos Asteras	Nea Filadelfeia
14:30 EET (UTC+2)	Pomonis 6'; Nikolaidis (penalty missed) 8', 44', 52', 55', 86'; Karafeskos 18'; Papaioannou 38', 75'; Karypidis 67'			Stadium: Nikos Goumas Stadium; Attendance: 2,292; Referee: Kostas Dikopoulos (Larissa)

7 February 1973 Round of 16	Apollon Kalamarias	2–1	AEK Athens	Thessaloniki
14:30 EET (UTC+2)	Gogos 8'; Salapasidis 90' (pen.)		Papaioannou 31'	Stadium: Kalamaria Stadium; Attendance: 8,000; Referee: Giorgos Armodoros (Piraeus)

=== UEFA Cup ===
==== First round ====
13 September 1972 First leg	AEK Athens (Greece)	3–1	(Hungary) Salgótarján	Athens, Greece
16:00 EET (UTC+2)	Psimogiannos (yellow card) 1'; Toskas (yellow card) 1'; Nikolaou 1', 54' (pen.); Vicente 42'	Report	Jeck 89' (pen.)	Stadium: AEK Stadium; Attendance: 14,798; Referee: Günter Männig (East Germany)

27 September 1972 Second leg	Salgótarján (Hungary)	1–1 (2–4 agg.)	(Greece) AEK Athens	Nógrád County, Hungary
16:00 EET (UTC+2)	Básti 53' (pen.)	Report	Nikolaidis (yellow card) 51'; Nikolaou 86'	Stadium: Malinovski út Sporttél; Attendance: 4,004; Referee: Charles Corver (Netherlands)

==== Second round ====
24 October 1972 First leg	Liverpool (England)	3–0	(Greece) AEK Athens	Liverpool, England
17:30 EET (UTC+2)	Boersma 9'; Cormack 28'; Smith 78' (pen.)	Report		Stadium: Anfield; Attendance: 31,906; Referee: Joaquim Campos (Portugal)

7 November 1972 Second leg	AEK Athens (Greece)	1–3 (1–6 agg.)	(England) Liverpool	Athens, Greece
15:00 EET (UTC+2)	Nikolaidis 34' (pen.); Pomonis (yellow card) 35'	Report	Cormack (yellow card) 13'; Hughes 17', 44'; Boersma 87'	Stadium: AEK Stadium; Attendance: 19,412; Referee: Petar Kostovski (Yugoslavia)

== Statistics ==
=== Squad statistics ===
As of 3 June 1973

No.	Pos	Player	Alpha Ethniki		Greek Cup		UEFA Cup		Total	
No.	Pos	Player	Apps	Goals	Apps	Goals	Apps	Goals	Apps	Goals
Goalkeepers
—	GK	(Argentina) Néstor Errea	27	0	1	0	4	0	32	0
—	GK	(Greece) Stelios Konstantinidis	5	0	2	0	0	0	7	0
—	GK	(Greece) Lakis Stergioudas	3	0	0	0	0	0	3	0
Defenders
—	DF	(Greece) Giorgos Tanidis	31	0	2	0	2	0	35	0
—	DF	(Greece) Rizos Lellis	30	1	2	0	4	0	36	1
—	DF	(Greece) Apostolos Toskas	19	0	2	0	4	0	25	0
—	DF	(Greece) Nikos Karapoulitidis	2	0	1	0	2	0	5	0
—	DF	(Greece) Stefanos Theodoridis	34	0	3	0	4	0	41	0
—	DF	(Greece) Kostas Triantafyllou	0	0	0	0	0	0	0	0
—	DF	(Greece) Lefteris Istorios	3	0	1	0	0	0	4	0
—	DF	(Greece) Petros Ravousis	16	0	1	0	0	0	17	0
Midfielders
—	MF	(Greece) Nikos Stathopoulos	13	0	1	0	0	0	14	0
—	MF	(Argentina) Hugo Horacio Zerr	5	0	2	0	1	0	8	0
—	MF	(Greece) Giorgos Karafeskos	23	1	3	1	0	0	26	2
—	MF	(Greece) Giorgos Lavaridis	28	2	2	0	2	0	32	2
—	MF	(Greece) Dionysis Tsamis	0	0	0	0	1	0	1	0
—	MF	(Greece) Vangelis Makos	0	0	0	0	0	0	0	0
Forwards
—	FW	(Greece) Mimis Papaioannou	21	7	3	3	4	0	28	10
—	FW	(Greece) Spyros Pomonis	21	2	3	2	4	0	28	4
—	FW	(Greece) Kostas Nikolaidis	28	7	3	4	4	2	35	13
—	FW	(Greece) Giannis Dandelis	26	7	2	1	3	0	31	8
—	FW	(Argentina) Rodolfo Vicente	17	1	1	0	4	1	22	2
—	FW	(Greece) Babis Psimogiannos	24	6	0	0	3	0	27	6
—	FW	(Greece) Lakis Nikolaou	31	5	1	0	4	2	36	7
—	FW	(Cyprus) Tasos Konstantinou	14	0	1	0	1	0	16	0
—	FW	(Greece) Stefanos Karypidis	8	0	2	1	0	0	10	1

=== Goalscorers ===
As of 3 June 1973
The list is sorted by competition order when total goals are equal, then by position and then alphabetically by surname.

Rank	Pos.	Player	Alpha Ethniki	Greek Cup	UEFA Cup	Total
1	FW	(Greece) Kostas Nikolaidis	7	4	2	13
2	FW	(Greece) Mimis Papaioannou	7	3	0	10
3	FW	(Greece) Giannis Dandelis	7	1	0	8
4	FW	(Greece) Lakis Nikolaou	5	0	2	7
5	FW	(Greece) Babis Psimogiannos	6	0	0	6
6	FW	(Greece) Spyros Pomonis	2	2	0	4
7	MF	(Greece) Giorgos Lavaridis	2	0	0	2
7	MF	(Greece) Giorgos Karafeskos	1	1	0	2
7	FW	(Argentina) Rodolfo Vicente	1	0	1	2
10	DF	(Greece) Rizos Lellis	1	0	0	1
10	FW	(Greece) Stefanos Karypidis	0	1	0	1
Own goals			0	0	0	0
Totals			39	12	5	56

=== Hat-tricks ===
Numbers in superscript represent the goals that the player scored.

Player	Against	Result	Date	Competition	Source
(Greece) Kostas Nikolaidis^{4}	(Greece) Ethnikos Asteras	9–0 (H)	3 January 1973	Greek Cup	
(Greece) Giannis Dandelis	(Greece) Fostiras	3–0 (H)	21 January 1973	Alpha Ethniki	

=== Clean sheets ===
As of 3 June 1973
The list is sorted by competition order when total clean sheets are equal and then alphabetically by surname. Clean sheets in games where both goalkeepers participated are awarded to the goalkeeper who started the game. Goalkeepers with no appearances are not included.

Rank	Player	Alpha Ethniki	Greek Cup	UEFA Cup	Total
1	(Argentina) Néstor Errea	11	1	0	12
2	(Greece) Stelios Konstantinidis	2	1	0	3
3	(Greece) Lakis Stergioudas	0	0	0	0
Totals		13	2	0	15

=== Disciplinary record ===
As of 3 June 1973

N	P	Nat.	Name	Alpha Ethniki			Greek Cup			UEFA Cup			Total			Notes
N	P	Nat.	Name	Yellow card	Second yellow card	Red card	Yellow card	Second yellow card	Red card	Yellow card	Second yellow card	Red card	Yellow card	Second yellow card	Red card	Notes
Goalkeepers
—	GK	(Argentina)	Néstor Errea													
—	GK	(Greece)	Stelios Konstantinidis													
—	GK	(Greece)	Lakis Stergioudas													
Defenders
—	DF	(Greece)	Giorgos Tanidis			1									1	
—	DF	(Greece)	Rizos Lellis													
—	DF	(Greece)	Apostolos Toskas							1			1			
—	DF	(Greece)	Nikos Karapoulitidis													
—	DF	(Greece)	Stefanos Theodoridis													
—	DF	(Greece)	Kostas Triantafyllou													
—	DF	(Greece)	Lefteris Istorios													
—	DF	(Greece)	Petros Ravousis													
Midfielders
—	MF	(Greece)	Nikos Stathopoulos													
—	MF	(Argentina)	Hugo Horacio Zerr													
—	MF	(Greece)	Giorgos Karafeskos													
—	MF	(Greece)	Giorgos Lavaridis													
—	MF	(Greece)	Dionysis Tsamis													
—	MF	(Greece)	Vangelis Makos													
Forwards
—	FW	(Greece)	Mimis Papaioannou													
—	FW	(Greece)	Spyros Pomonis							1			1			
—	FW	(Greece)	Kostas Nikolaidis							1			1			
—	FW	(Greece)	Giannis Dandelis													
—	FW	(Argentina)	Rodolfo Vicente													
—	FW	(Greece)	Babis Psimogiannos							1			1			
—	FW	(Greece)	Lakis Nikolaou													
—	FW	(Cyprus)	Tasos Konstantinou													
—	FW	(Greece)	Stefanos Karypidis													

=== Starting 11 ===
This section presents the most frequently used formation along with the players with the most starts across all competitions.

N.	Formation	Matchday(s)
41	4–2–4	1–34

Nat.	Player	Pos.
(Argentina)	Néstor Errea	GK
(Greece)	Apostolos Toskas	RCB
(Greece)	Giorgos Tanidis	LCB
(Greece)	Stefanos Theodoridis	RB
(Greece)	Rizos Lellis	LB
(Greece)	Giorgos Lavaridis	RDM
(Greece)	Giorgos Karafeskos	LDM
(Greece)	Lakis Nikolaou	RW
(Greece)	Spyros Pomonis	LW
(Greece)	Mimis Papaioannou (C)	RCF
(Greece)	Kostas Nikolaidis	LCF

Last updated: 1973-06-03
