= 1971–72 AEK Athens F.C. season =

AEK Athens
1971–72 season
- Chairman: Kosmas Chatzicharalampous
- Manager: Branko Stanković
- Stadium: AEK Stadium
- Alpha Ethniki: 3rd
- Greek Cup: Round of 16
- European Cup: First round
- Top goalscorer: League: Mimis Papaioannou (12); All: Mimis Papaioannou (13)
- Highest home attendance: 30,267 vs Olympiacos (31 October 1971)
- Lowest home attendance: 3,494 vs Olympiakos Nicosia (28 May 1972)
- Average home league attendance: 18,028
- Biggest win: AEK Athens 5–0 Olympiakos Nicosia; AEK Athens 5–0 Pierikos
- Biggest defeat: Internazionale 4–1 AEK Athens
Home colours

The 1971–72 season was the 48th season in the existence of AEK Athens F.C. and the 13th consecutive season in the top flight of Greek football. They competed in the Alpha Ethniki, the Greek Cup and the European Cup. The season began on 29 August 1971 and finished on 11 June 1972.

== Overview ==
After the distinctions of the previous years, AEK seemed to operate in a "frantic tempo", until this season, which was the passing to a declining period for the club. The roster was constantly renewed as a generation of players left, passing the torch to the next one. The new generation was consisted of prominent players, however the club was not ready to claim a leading role in the league. The notable transfers of the season were the arrivals of Giorgos Tanidis from Aris Ptolemaida, Babis Psimogiannos from Aris Agios Konstantinos, but most importantly that of the promising striker of Atromitos, Lakis Nikolaou.

AEK participated in the European Cup. The draw was tough for them, as from the very first round faced one of the greastest European clubs over time, the great Internazionale of Ivano Bordon, Giacinto Facchetti and Sandro Mazzola. The first match at San Siro in front of almost 80,000 spectators, AEK managed to take the lead at the 14th minute with Pomonis, but Inter's superiority was obvious and after equalizing 5 minutes later, they finished the first half leading by 3–1. The second half turned out to be a standard procedure with Inter raising the score to 4–1 and likewise the few chances of AEK qualifying disappeared. In the rematch at the crowded AEK Stadium no one expected what was about to happen. Everything started wrong for the yellow-blacks, as they were left behind the score at the 17th minute with a goal by Mazzola. Bertini's dismissal two minutes later and Stankovic's offensive style, brought AEK in taking the lead at the half time with Ventouris and Papaioannou, while also having two shots hit the post. The Italians, wanting if nothing else not to lose, chased the goal and equalized with Boninsegna at the 76th minute. The players of AEK, realizing that the qualification was definitively lost, sought the victory and achieved it with a goal by Nikolaidis at the 89th minute, that made the final 3–2. One of the greatest victories for the then "poor" Greek football and the first great European night for AEK.

This season was marked by changes in the conduct of the Cup, as the amateur clubs of the local associations cease to participate, while clubs of the national divisions only could participate. The ties of the first round competed again according to geographical criteria. There AEK easily overcame PAO Rouf winning them by 4–1 at home. From the second round onwards the draw was free and thus AEK faced Kozani prevailing with a 4–0 home win. At the round of 16 they were drawn against Lamia of Andreas Stamatiadis away from home and to everyone's surprise they were eliminated, losing by 1–0 at the extra time.

In the league AEK presented two faces throughout the season. In the home matches they achieved only one draw and one defeat, winning the rest of the games. However they paid their bad performances in the away matches, dropping points in almost every away game, achieving only 4 wins out of the 17 total of games. That resulted in a third-place finish with 6 points behind the champion Panathinaikos. Top scorer of the team was Mimis Papaioannou with 12 league goals.

== Management team ==
Position	Staff
Manager	(Socialist Federal Republic of Yugoslavia) Branko Stanković
Assistant manager	(Greece) Kostas Chatzimichail
Academy director	(Greece) Georgios Daispangos
Academy manager	(Greece) Georgios Daispangos

== Players ==
=== Squad information ===
NOTE: The players are the ones that have been announced by the AEK Athens' press release. No edits should be made unless a player arrival or exit is announced. Updated 11 June 1972, 23:59 UTC+2.

Player	Nat.	Position(s)	Date of birth (Age)	Signed	Previous club	Transfer fee	Contract until
Goalkeepers
Stelios Serafidis	(Greece)	GK	6 August 1935 (aged 36)	1953	(Greece) AEK Athens U20	—	1976
Stelios Konstantinidis	(Greece)	GK	6 June 1947 (aged 25)	1967	(Greece) AEK Athens U20	—	1976
Kostas Silivistras	(Greece)	GK	1951 (aged 20–21)	1971	(Greece) Atromitos	Free	1979
Defenders
Giorgos Kefalidis	(Greece)	RB / CB	21 March 1941 (aged 31)	1964	(Greece) Pierikos	₯800,000	1976
Giorgos Tanidis	(Greece)	CB	25 December 1946 (aged 25)	1971	(Greece) Aris Ptolemaida	₯120,000	1979
Apostolos Toskas	(Greece)	CB	28 December 1947 (aged 24)	1969	(Greece) Trikala	₯1,500,000	1977
Nikos Karapoulitidis	(Greece)	LB / RB / CB	30 November 1948 (aged 23)	1968	(Greece) AEK Athens U20	—	1976
Stefanos Theodoridis	(Greece)	RB / LB / CB / RM / LM	19 June 1950 (aged 22)	1969	(Greece) AEK Athens U20	—	1977
Kostas Triantafyllou	(Greece)	CB / RB / LB / DM	1950 (aged 21–22)	1969	(Greece) AEK Athens U20	—	1977
Lefteris Istorios	(Greece)	RB / LB / CM / DM	2 October 1951 (aged 20)	1971	(Greece) AEK Athens U20	—	1979
Midfielders
Stelios Skevofilakas (Vice-captain)	(Greece)	LM / RM / AM / CM	6 January 1939 (aged 33)	1961	(Greece) Eleftheroupoli	Free	1976
Panagiotis Ventouris	(Greece)	LM / RM / LW / RW / ST / AM / SS	1 March 1943 (aged 29)	1965	(Greece) Fostiras	₯400,000	1976
Nikos Stathopoulos	(Greece)	LM / LB / CM	8 November 1943 (aged 28)	1966	(Greece) AEK Athens U20	—	1977
Giorgos Karafeskos	(Greece)	CM / DM / RM / RW	8 December 1946 (aged 25)	1965	(Greece) AEK Athens U20	—	1976
Giorgos Lavaridis	(Greece)	CM / DM / CB	15 October 1947 (aged 24)	1968	(Greece) AEK Athens U20	—	1976
Forwards
Andreas Papaemmanouil	(Greece)	RW / LW / RM / LM / SS / AM / CM	18 February 1939 (aged 33)	1969	(Greece) Panathinaikos	Free	1977
Mimis Papaioannou (Captain)	(Greece)	SS / ST / AM / RW	17 November 1942 (aged 29)	1962	(Greece) Veria	₯175,000	1976
Spyros Pomonis	(Greece)	LW / LM	12 February 1944 (aged 28)	1960	(Greece) AEK Athens U20	—	1976
Kostas Nikolaidis	(Greece)	RW / LW / SS / ST	10 September 1944 (aged 27)	1965	(Greece) PAO Safraboli	₯400,000	1976
Kostas Chanios	(Greece)	LW / SS	1947 (aged 24–25)	1969	(Greece) Levadiakos	₯300,000	1977
Babis Psimogiannos	(Greece)	ST	13 August 1947 (aged 24)	1971	(Greece) Aris Agios Konstantinos	Free	1979
Giorgos Kachris	(Greece)	RW / LW / RM / LM	1949 (aged 22–23)	1969	(Greece) Amyna Ampelokipoi	₯200,000	1977
Lakis Nikolaou	(Greece)	ST / RW / CB / RB	17 July 1949 (aged 22)	1971	(Greece) Atromitos	₯600,000	1979

== Transfers ==
=== In ===
Pos.	Player	From	Fee	Date	Contract Until	Source
GK	(Greece) Kostas Silivistras	(Greece) Atromitos	Free transfer	31 August 1971	30 June 1979	
DF	(Greece) Giorgos Tanidis	(Greece) Aris Ptolemaida	₯120,000^{[a]}	1 August 1971	30 June 1979	
DF	(Greece) Lefteris Istorios	(Greece) AEK Athens U20	Promotion	7 October 1971	30 June 1979	
FW	(Greece) Babis Psimogiannos	(Greece) Aris Agios Konstantinos	Free transfer	28 August 1971	30 June 1979	
FW	(Greece) Lakis Nikolaou	(Greece) Atromitos	₯600,000^{[b]}	31 July 1971	30 June 1979	

a. plus sports material and incomes from a friendly match between the two clubs.

b. plus Dimitris Liakouris and Panagiotis Psychogios as an exchange, while Giannis Kokkinos and Manolis Tsakiroglou from the reserve team as a loan.

=== Out ===
Pos.	Player	To	Fee	Date	Source
DF	(Greece) Dimitris Liakouris	(Greece) Atromitos	Free transfer	31 July 1971	
MF	(Cyprus) Lakis Avramidis	(Cyprus) Olympiakos Nicosia	Contract termination	3 September 1971	
FW	(Greece) Panagiotis Psychogios	(Greece) Atromitos	Free transfer	31 July 1971	
FW	(Greece) Kostas Pachnis	(Greece) Panarkadikos	Contract termination	1 October 1971	

=== Loan out ===
Pos.	Player	To	Fee	Date	Until	Option to buy	Source
FW	(Greece) Dimitris Palasidis	(Greece) AO Koropi	Free	1 October 1971	30 June 1972	✗	

=== Overall transfer activity ===
Expenditure: ▼ ₯720,000

Income: ▲ ₯0

Net Total: ▼ ₯720,000

== Pre-season and friendlies ==
2 July 1971 Friendly	AEK Athens	1–4	Greece gendarmerie	Nea Filadelfeia
15:00 EET (UTC+2)	Goal	Report	Kachris	Stadium: AEK Stadium; Referee: Kostas Chatzimichail
Note: Kachris competed with the Greek gendarmerie against AEK.

1 August 1971 Friendly	Florina	0–3	AEK Athens	Florina
		Report	Papaioannou 6', 20'; Karafeskos 80'	Stadium: Florina Municipal Stadium; Attendance: 2,000; Referee: Minkos

3 August 1971 Friendly	Kastoria	1–2	AEK Athens	Kastoria
	Karamanidis 75'	Report	Papaioannou 5'; Kachris 80'	Stadium: Municipal Stadium of Kastoria; Attendance: 3,180; Referee: Zeibekis

4 August 1971 Friendly	Aris Ptolemaida	0–8	AEK Athens	Ptolemaida
		Report	Ventouris 12', 83'; Nikolaidis 20', 43'; Papaemmanouil 30', 41'; Karafeskos 59'; Pomonis 73'	Stadium: Municipal Ptolemaida Stadium; Attendance: 3,000; Referee: Zeibekis

11 August 1971 Friendly	AEK Athens	2–1	Atromitos	Nea Filadelfeia
20:30 EET (UTC+2)	Papaemmanouil 44'; Papaioannou 84'	Report	Tsivouglis 30' (pen.)	Stadium: AEK Stadium; Attendance: 12,000; Referee: Nikos Giannopoulos (Athens)

15 August 1971 Friendly	AEK Athens	0–1	Peñarol	Nea Filadelfeia
20:30 EET (UTC+2)		Report	Onega 5'	Stadium: AEK Stadium; Attendance: 17,000; Referee: Stathis Papavasiliou (Piraeus)

1 September 1971 Friendly	AEK Athens	1–1	Universidad Católica	Nea Filadelfeia
20:30 EET (UTC+2)	Papaioannou 30'	Report	Crisoforo 35'; Faundez (red card) 63'	Stadium: AEK Stadium; Attendance: 20,000; Referee: Christos Michas (Athens)

7 September 1971 Friendly	AEK Athens	1–4	Hamburger SV	Nea Filadelfeia
20:30 EET (UTC+2)	Nikolaidis 70' (pen.)	Report	Zaczyk 4', 32'; Kurbjuhn 10'; Hönig 73'	Stadium: AEK Stadium; Attendance: 8,000; Referee: Dimitris Protonotarios (Athens)

25 September 1971 Friendly	AEK Athens	6–0	Atromitos	Nea Filadelfeia
20:30 EET (UTC+2)	Papaioannou 14', 41'; Papaemmanouil 15'; Karafeskos 17'; Psimogiannos 29'; Nikolaidis 75'	Report		Stadium: AEK Stadium; Referee: Kritikos
Note: The match was interrupted at the 66th minute for 13 minutes, due to a malfunction in the floodlights and at the 82nd minute it was abandoned for the same issue.

28 December 1971 Friendly	AEK Athens	1–0	Bayern Munich	Nea Filadelfeia
14:45 EET (UTC+2)	Papaemmanouil 89'	Report		Stadium: AEK Stadium; Attendance: 11,193; Referee: Christos Kougias (Athens)

2 February 1972 Friendly	AEK Athens	0–3	CSKA Sofia	Nea Filadelfeia
15:30 EET (UTC+2)		Report	Nikodimov 35'; Yakimov 65'; Trankov 88'	Stadium: AEK Stadium; Attendance: 2,413; Referee: Eleftheriadis (Athens)

10 February 1972 Friendly	Ikaros Athens	1–1	AEK Athens	Nea Ionia
	Koukas 50'	Report	Karafeskos 18'	Stadium: Municipal Stadium of Nea Ionia; Referee: Takis Loukanidis
Note: 60-minute match (30-minute halves).

16 February 1972 Friendly	Panetolikos	1–2	AEK Athens	Agrinio
	Starakas 6' (pen.)	Report	Kachris 4'; Lavaridis 42'	Stadium: Panetolikos Stadium; Attendance: 6,000; Referee: Kournoutos

5 March 1972 Friendly	Apollon Athens	0–2	AEK Athens	Rizoupoli
		Report	Nikolaidis 23'; Nikolaou 42'	Stadium: Rizoupoli Stadium; Attendance: 2,000; Referee: Giannakopoulos

26 April 1972 Friendly	Korinthos	2–0	AEK Athens	Corinth
	Mantelos 50'; Thymis 60'	Report		Stadium: Korinthos Stadium; Referee: Skourtis

3 May 1972 Friendly	Panargiakos	3–1	AEK Athens	Argos
16:00 EET (UTC+2)	Koliatsis 41'; Serfas 73'; Varveletis 75'	Report	Istorios 27'	Stadium: Argos Municipal Stadium; Attendance: 3,000; Referee: Boukouras

7 May 1972 Friendly	Olympiacos	3–1	AEK Athens	Piraeus
17:00 EET (UTC+2)	Siokos 17' (pen.); Triantafyllos 65'; Karavitis 82'	Report	Ventouris 3'	Stadium: Karaiskakis Stadium; Attendance: 20,000; Referee: Thomaidis (Piraeus)

24 May 1972 Friendly	Panarkadikos	1–4	AEK Athens	Tripoli
17:30 EET (UTC+2)	Chronopoulos 81'	Report	Nikolaidis 38'; Psimogiannos 43'; Papaemmanouil 83'	Stadium: Panarkadikos Stadium; Attendance: 4,000; Referee: Mougopetros

7 June 1972 Friendly	AEK Athens	1–1	Juventus SP	Nea Filadelfeia
21:00 EET (UTC+2)	Psimogiannos 55'	Report	Brecha 27'	Stadium: AEK Stadium; Attendance: 15,772; Referee: Papazoglou (Athens)

14 June 1972 Friendly	AEK Athens	3–1	Željezničar	Nea Filadelfeia
21:00 EET (UTC+2)	Zerr 34'; Vicente 39'; Nikolaou 84'	Report	Sprečo 44'	Stadium: AEK Stadium; Attendance: 11,741; Referee: Giannis Famelis (Athens)

18 June 1972 Friendly	AEK Athens	0–4	Željezničar	Nea Filadelfeia
21:00 EET (UTC+2)	Pomonis (red card) 54'	Report	Hrvat 11'; Janković 23', 70'; Sprečo 24'; Jelušić (red card) 54'	Stadium: AEK Stadium; Attendance: 15,330; Referee: Alexopoulos (Athens)

21 June 1972 Friendly	AEK Athens	1–3	Juventus SP	Nea Filadelfeia
21:00 EET (UTC+2)	Rieländer 24'	Report	Brecha 10'; Brida 25'; Pinheiro 84'	Stadium: AEK Stadium; Attendance: 7,000; Referee: Kastanos (Athens)

=== OPAP Summer Championship ===
7 July 1971 1	AEK Athens	1–2	Panathinaikos	Nea Filadelfeia
17:30 EET (UTC+2)	Palasidis 34'	Report	Palamaras 12'; Papageorgiou 21'	Stadium: AEK Stadium; Referee: Pan Marinos (Piraeus)
Note: The match was originally scheduled for 20 June, but it was postponed due to competitive obligations of both clubs.

14 July 1971 2	AEK Athens	1–0	Egaleo	Nea Ionia
17:30 EET (UTC+2)	Zafiropoulos 12'	Report		Stadium: Municipal Stadium of Nea Ionia; Referee: D. Thomaidis
Note: The match was originally scheduled for 30 June, but it was postponed due to competitive obligations of AEK Athens.

4 July 1971 3	Olympiacos	0–1	AEK Athens	Piraeus
20:30 EET (UTC+2)		Report	Zafiropoulos 88'	Stadium: Karaiskakis Stadium; Attendance: 4,000; Referee: Giannis Adamakis (Chalkida)

11 July 1971 4	AEK Athens	3–2	Panionios	Nea Ionia
17:30 EET (UTC+2)	Avramidis 43' (pen.); Chanios (??); Psychogios 70'	Report	Argyropoulos 30'; Pantazis 80'	Stadium: Municipal Stadium of Nea Ionia; Referee: Kastanos (Athens)

18 July 1971 5	Ethnikos Piraeus	3–3	AEK Athens	Piraeus
20:30 EET (UTC+2)	Kardiakidis 62' (pen.), 66', 73' (pen.)	Report	Zafiropoulos 8'; Psychogios 21'; Kollias 60'	Stadium: Karaiskakis Stadium; Attendance: 3,000; Referee: Kostas Krikonis (Epirus)

25 July 1971 6	Panathinaikos	1–2	AEK Athens	Chalandri
17:30 EET (UTC+2)	Papageorgiou 61'	Report	Tsakiroglou 12'; Palasidis 44'	Stadium: Chalandri Municipal Stadium; Referee: Gargaropoulos

1 August 1971 7	Egaleo	2–0	AEK Athens	Aigaleo
17:00 EET (UTC+2)	Tzanoudakis 38'; Tsalamangas 80'	Report		Stadium: Stavros Mavrothalassitis Stadium; Referee: Giannikakis (Piraeus)

8 August 1971 8	AEK Athens	1–1	Olympiacos	Nea Ionia
17:00 EET (UTC+2)	Lavaridis 53'	Report	Kapernekas 76'	Stadium: Municipal Stadium of Nea Ionia; Attendance: 1,000; Referee: Michalis Ornerakis (Chania)

15 August 1971 9	Panionios	4–0	AEK Athens	Tavros
17:00 EET (UTC+2)	Athanasoulas 50'; Sangoridis 52'; Chiotis 65'; Anaidraris 80'	Report		Stadium: Tavros Stadium; Referee: Karvelis

22 August 1971 10	AEK Athens	1–0	Ethnikos Piraeus	Nea Filadelfeia
20:30 EET (UTC+2)	Karafeskos 4'	Report		Stadium: AEK Stadium; Attendance: 8,753; Referee: Kostas Levogiannis (Athens)

5 September 1971 3rd place play-off	Kavala	1–0	AEK Athens	Katerini
16:00 EET (UTC+2)	Filippidis 35'	Report		Stadium: Katerini Stadium; Referee: Christos Dilzas (Thessaloniki)

=== Greek Super Cup ===
30 June 1971 First leg	Olympiacos	2–2	AEK Athens	Piraeus
20:30 EET (UTC+2)	Gioutsos 2'; Kapernekas 70'	Report	Kachris 56', 88'	Stadium: Karaiskakis Stadium; Attendance: 36,449; Referee: Stathis Papavasiliou (Piraeus)
Note: Due to the departure of the national team to Mexico, it was agreed that the Greek internationals would compete only in the first half of the match, resulting in the usage of 31 players in total. In reality only Papaioannou competed for one half, Glezos did not play at all, while Toskas, Stathopoulos and Gaitatzis played the entire match.

4 September 1971 Second leg	AEK Athens	1–1 (3–3 agg.) (4–2 p)	Olympiacos	Nea Filadelfeia
20:30 EET (UTC+2)	Ventouris 21'	Report	Karavitis 11'	Stadium: AEK Stadium; Attendance: 25,136; Referee: Giannis Famelis (Athens)
	Penalties
	Nikolaidis (penalty scored); Karafeskos (penalty scored); Toskas (penalty missed); Ventouris (penalty scored); Papaioannou (penalty scored)		(penalty missed) Gioutsos; (penalty missed) Siokos; (penalty scored) Papadimitriou; (penalty scored) Karavitis; (penalty missed) Argyroudis
Note: Karavitis was subbed off at the 46th minute and was subbed on again, at the 74th minute.

== Competitions ==
=== Overall record ===
Competition	First match	Last match	Starting round	Final position	Record							
Competition	First match	Last match	Starting round	Final position	Pld	W	D	L	GF	GA	GD	Win %
Alpha Ethniki	19 September 1971	11 June 1972	Matchday 1	3rd	34	20	8	6	57	23	+34	58.82
Greek Cup	29 August 1971	8 March 1972	First round	Round of 16	3	2	0	1	8	2	+6	66.67
European Cup	15 September 1971	29 September 1971	First round	First round	2	1	0	1	4	6	−2	50.00
Total					39	23	8	8	69	31	+38	58.97

Last updated: 11 June 1972
Source: Competitions

=== Alpha Ethniki ===
==== League table ====
Pos	Team	Pld	W	D	L	GF	GA	GD	Pts	Qualification or relegation
1	Panathinaikos (C)	34	24	6	4	89	23	+66	88	Qualification for European Cup first round
2	Olympiacos	34	20	9	5	61	33	+28	83	Qualification for UEFA Cup first round
3	AEK Athens	34	20	8	6	57	23	+34	82	Qualification for UEFA Cup first round
4	Aris	34	18	11	5	52	25	+27	81	
5	PAOK	34	18	10	6	53	27	+26	80	Qualification for Cup Winners' Cup first round

Source: RSSSF
Rules for classification: 1st points; 2nd decision match; 3rd head-to-head goal difference.
(C) Champions

==== Results summary ====
Overall								Home						Away					
Pld	W	D	L	GF	GA	GD	Pts	W	D	L	GF	GA	GD	W	D	L	GF	GA	GD
34	20	8	6	57	23	+34	82	15	1	1	39	7	+32	5	7	5	18	16	+2

Source: Competitive matches

==== Results by Matchday ====
Round	1	2	3	4	5	6	7	8	9	10	11	12	13	14	15	16	17	18	19	20	21	22	23	24	25	26	27	28	29	30	31	32	33	34
Ground	H	A	H	A	H	A	H	H	A	H	A	H	A	H	A	A	H	A	H	A	H	A	H	A	A	H	A	H	A	H	A	H	H	A
Result	W	L	W	D	W	L	D	W	D	W	D	W	D	W	W	D	W	L	W	D	W	W	W	D	W	L	W	W	W	W	L	W	W	L
Position	6	11	4	7	4	6	8	5	5	5	5	5	5	4	4	4	4	4	4	4	3	3	2	2	2	3	2	2	2	2	3	3	3	3

Source: Competitive matches
A = Away; H = Home; W = Win; D = Draw; L = Loss; P = Postponed

==== Matches ====
19 September 1971 1	AEK Athens	1–0	PAOK	Nea Filadelfeia
16:15 EET (UTC+2)	Ventouris 77'			Stadium: AEK Stadium; Attendance: 28,581; Referee: Michalis Kyriakidis (Cyprus)

6 October 1971 2	Veria	1–0	AEK Athens	Veria
15:30 EET (UTC+2)	Rantidis 60'			Stadium: Veria Stadium; Attendance: 7,000; Referee: Stathis Papavasiliou (Piraeus)

3 October 1971 3	AEK Athens	3–0	Panachaiki	Nea Filadelfeia
15:30 EET (UTC+2)	Papaioannou 52'; Psimogiannos 62', 78'			Stadium: AEK Stadium; Attendance: 25,548; Referee: Lepidas
Note: At the 69th minute the goalkeeper of AEK Athens, Konstantinidis was injured and was replaced by forward Papaioannou, since the team had already used the two permitted substitutions. At the 88th minute, Panachaiki suffered the same fate, with defender Androutsos replacing Saraliotis.

10 October 1971 4	Egaleo	0–0	AEK Athens	Aigaleo
15:30 EET (UTC+2)				Stadium: Stavros Mavrothalassitis Stadium; Attendance: 11,614; Referee: Perperidis

17 October 1971 5	AEK Athens	2–1	Panathinaikos	Nea Filadelfeia
15:30 EET (UTC+2)	Nikolaidis 10', 32'		Domazos 57'	Stadium: AEK Stadium; Attendance: 29,966; Referee: Stathis Papavasiliou (Piraeus)

24 October 1971 6	Aris	3–2	AEK Athens	Thessaloniki
15:30 EET (UTC+2)	Keramidas 25'; Alexiadis 63'; Tyriakidis 81'		Nikolaidis 53'; Nikolaou 73'	Stadium: Aris Stadium; Attendance: 14,196; Referee: Christos Kougias (Athens)

31 October 1971 7	AEK Athens	1–1	Olympiacos	Nea Filadelfeia
15:00 EET (UTC+2)	Papaioannou 54'		Synetopoulos 25' (pen.)	Stadium: AEK Stadium; Attendance: 29,812; Referee: Stathis Papavasiliou (Piraeus)

7 November 1971 8	AEK Athens	3–0	Fostiras	Nea Filadelfeia
15:00 EET (UTC+2)	Nikolaou 7', 60'; Papaioannou 54'			Stadium: AEK Stadium; Attendance: 12,982; Referee: Timoleon Latsios (Larissa)

14 November 1971 9	Trikala	0–0	AEK Athens	Trikala
15:00 EET (UTC+2)				Stadium: Trikala Municipal Stadium; Attendance: 15,728; Referee: Christos Michas (Athens)

21 November 1971 10	AEK Athens	4–0	Iraklis	Nea Filadelfeia
15:00 EET (UTC+2)	Pomonis 25'; Nikoloudis 48' (o.g.); Papaioannou 70'; Nikolaidis 77' (pen.)		Chaliabalias (red card) 62'	Stadium: AEK Stadium; Attendance: 19,067; Referee: Christos Kougias (Athens)

12 December 1971 11	Ethnikos Piraeus	2–2	AEK Athens	Piraeus
	Triantafyllou 54' (o.g.); Michailidis 75'		Pomonis 6', 89'	Stadium: Karaiskakis Stadium; Attendance: 17,256; Referee: Christos Michas (Athens)

19 December 1971 12	AEK Athens	2–0	Apollon Athens	Nea Filadelfeia
14:45 EET (UTC+2)	Ventouris 37'; Papaioannou 80'			Stadium: AEK Stadium; Attendance: 12,710; Referee: Komninakis (Athens)

26 December 1971 13	Olympiacos Volos	0–0	AEK Athens	Volos
14:45 EET (UTC+2)				Stadium: Volos Municipal Stadium; Attendance: 7,364; Referee: Nikos Zlatanos (Thessaloniki)

2 January 1972 14	AEK Athens	1–0	Kavala	Nea Filadelfeia
14:45 EET (UTC+2)	Papaioannou 76'			Stadium: AEK Stadium; Attendance: 17,552; Referee: Christos Kougias (Athens)

9 January 1972 15	Olympiakos Nicosia	1–3	AEK Athens	Nicosia
14:45 EET (UTC+2)	Markou (red card) 56'; Efthimiadis 87' (pen.)		Kachris 53'; Nikolaou 65'; Papaemmanouil 85'	Stadium: GSP Stadium; Attendance: 4,231; Referee: Manolis Platopoulos (Athens)

16 January 1972 16	Pierikos	0–0	AEK Athens	Katerini
14:45 EET (UTC+2)				Stadium: Katerini Stadium; Attendance: 1,962; Referee: Kostas Xanthos (Dodecanese)

23 January 1972 17	AEK Athens	1–0	Panionios	Nea Filadelfeia
15:30 EET (UTC+2)	Nikolaou 10'		Mavros (red card) 77'	Stadium: AEK Stadium; Attendance: 11,820; Referee: Giannis Famelis (Athens)

30 January 1972 18	PAOK	2–0	AEK Athens	Thessaloniki
15:15 EET (UTC+2)	Sarafis 19'; Paridis 55'			Stadium: Toumba Stadium; Attendance: 35,411; Referee: Pyloridis

6 February 1972 19	AEK Athens	3–1	Veria	Nea Filadelfeia
15:30 EET (UTC+2)	Nikolaidis 1'; Karafeskos 80'; Pomonis 30'		Gaitanos 40'	Stadium: AEK Stadium; Attendance: 11,616; Referee: Giannakos (Macedonia)

13 February 1972 20	Panachaiki	1–1	AEK Athens	Patras
15:30 EET (UTC+2)	Rigas 30'		Karafeskos 7'	Stadium: Panachaiki Stadium; Attendance: 14,555; Referee: Giorgos Katsoras (Thessaloniki)

20 February 1972 21	AEK Athens	2–1	Egaleo	Nea Filadelfeia
15:30 EET (UTC+2)	Papaioannou 49', 53'		Chrisostomou 86'	Stadium: AEK Stadium; Attendance: 17,201; Referee: Nanos

27 February 1972 22	Panathinaikos	1–2	AEK Athens	Ampelokipoi
15:30 EET (UTC+2)	Domazos 15'		Pomonis 55'; Nikolaidis 79' (pen.)	Stadium: Leoforos Alexandras Stadium; Attendance: 24,817; Referee: Nikos Zlatanos (Thessaloniki)

12 March 1972 23	AEK Athens	2–0	Aris	Nea Filadelfeia
16:00 EET (UTC+2)	Papaioannou 18', 71'			Stadium: AEK Stadium; Attendance: 22,276; Referee: Pan Marinos (Piraeus)

19 March 1972 24	Olympiacos	1–1	AEK Athens	Piraeus
16:30 EET (UTC+2)	Triantafyllos 45'		Papaioannou 75'	Stadium: Karaiskakis Stadium; Attendance: 38,376; Referee: Stathis Papabasileiou (Piraeus)

26 March 1972 25	Fostiras	0–2	AEK Athens	Tavros
16:30 EET (UTC+2)			Pomonis 26'; Nikolaidis 42'	Stadium: Tavros Stadium; Attendance: 8,517; Referee: Nikos Lagogiannis (Piraeus)

2 April 1972 26	AEK Athens	1–2	Trikala	Nea Filadelfeia
16:30 EET (UTC+2)	Pomonis 76'		Kalantzis 34'; Sinatkas 85'	Stadium: AEK Stadium; Attendance: 20,108; Referee: Giorgos Armodoros (Piraeus)

16 April 1972 27	Iraklis	1–2	AEK Athens	Thessaloniki
16:30 EET (UTC+2)	Koutroubelis 16'		Papaioannou 10'; Pomonis 58'	Stadium: Kaftanzoglio Stadium; Attendance: 9,087; Referee: Kostas Xanthos (Dodecanese)

23 April 1972 28	AEK Athens	1–0	Ethnikos Piraeus	Nea Filadelfeia
16:30 EET (UTC+2)	Nikolaidis 22'			Stadium: AEK Stadium; Attendance: 18,504; Referee: Christos Michas (Athens)

30 April 1972 29	Apollon Athens	0–2	AEK Athens	Rizoupoli
17:00 EET (UTC+2)			Lavaridis 18'; Nikolaou 80'	Stadium: Rizoupoli Stadium; Attendance: 8,070; Referee: Stathis Papabasileiou (Piraeus)

14 May 1972 30	AEK Athens	2–1	Olympiacos Volos	Nea Filadelfeia
17:00 EET (UTC+2)	Pomonis (yellow card) 24', (goal) 83'; Kefalidis 70'		Tsouknidas 87'	Stadium: AEK Stadium; Attendance: 14,332; Referee: Giorgos Armodoros (Piraeus)

21 May 1972 31	Kavala	1–0	AEK Athens	Kavala
17:30 EET (UTC+2)	Chrisafidis 66'			Stadium: Kavala National Stadium; Attendance: 10,006; Referee: Dimitris Protonotarios (Athens)

28 May 1972 32	AEK Athens	5–0	Olympiakos Nicosia	Nea Filadelfeia
17:30 EET (UTC+2)	Pomonis 55'; Nikolaidis 64' (pen.), 88'; Nikolaou 69'; Toskas 72'			Stadium: AEK Stadium; Attendance: 3,494; Referee: Nikos Lagogiannis (Piraeus)

4 June 1972 33	AEK Athens	5–0	Pierikos	Nea Filadelfeia
17:30 EET (UTC+2)	Nikolaou 5', 38', 74'; Skevofilakas 58'; Traganos 83' (o.g.)			Stadium: AEK Stadium; Attendance: 8,447; Referee: Chiotakis (Thessaloniki)

11 June 1972 34	Panionios	2–1	AEK Athens	Nea Smyrni
17:30 EET (UTC+2)	Intzoglou 29'; Panagiotidis 52'		Nikolaou 58'	Stadium: Nea Smyrni Stadium; Attendance: 7,632; Referee: Giannakos (Macedonia)

=== Greek Cup ===
==== Matches ====
29 August 1971 First round	AEK Athens	4–1	PAO Rouf	Nea Filadelfeia
16:30 EET (UTC+2)	Nikolaidis 6'; Papaioannou 38', 65'; Papaemmanouil 86'		Georgopoulos 68'	Stadium: AEK Stadium; Attendance: 7,537; Referee: Giannis Famelis (Athens)

5 December 1971 Round of 32	AEK Athens	4–0	Kozani	Nea Filadelfeia
14:15 EET (UTC+2)	Nikolaidis 28' (pen.), 75'; Papaioannou 38', 60'			Stadium: Nikos Goumas Stadium; Attendance: 2,292; Referee: Perperidis (Athens)

8 March 1972 Round of 16	Lamia	1–0 (a.e.t.)	AEK Athens	Lamia
15:30 EET (UTC+2)	Zervas 110'			Stadium: Lamia Municipal Stadium; Attendance: 10,000; Referee: Timoleon Latsios (Larissa)

=== European Cup ===
==== First round ====
15 September 1971 First leg	Internazionale (Italy)	4–1	(Greece) AEK Athens	Milan, Italy
21:00 EET (UTC+2)	Jair (yellow card) 5', (goal) 44'; Bertini (yellow card) 18'; Mazzola 20'; Facchetti 35'; Boninsegna 61' (pen.); Corso (yellow card) 69'	Report	Pomonis (yellow card) 14', (goal) 15'; Toskas (red card) 83'	Stadium: San Siro; Attendance: 72,333; Referee: Vital Loraux (Belgium)

29 September 1971 Second leg	AEK Athens (Greece)	3–2 (4–6 agg.)	(Italy) Internazionale	Athens, Greece
21:00 EET (UTC+2)	Ventouris 29'; Papaioannou 45'; Nikolaidis 89'	Report	Karafeskos 17' (o.g.); Bertini (yellow card) 1' (red card) 20'; Boninsegna 75'	Stadium: AEK Stadium; Attendance: 29,449; Referee: Tofiq Bahramov (Soviet Union)

== Statistics ==
=== Squad statistics ===
As of 11 June 1972

No.	Pos	Player	Alpha Ethniki		Greek Cup		European Cup		Total	
No.	Pos	Player	Apps	Goals	Apps	Goals	Apps	Goals	Apps	Goals
Goalkeepers
—	GK	(Greece) Stelios Serafidis	21	0	2	0	0	0	23	0
—	GK	(Greece) Stelios Konstantinidis	13	0	1	0	2	0	16	0
—	GK	(Greece) Kostas Silivistras	1	0	0	0	0	0	1	0
Defenders
—	DF	(Greece) Giorgos Kefalidis	15	1	0	0	2	0	17	1
—	DF	(Greece) Giorgos Tanidis	18	0	1	0	0	0	19	0
—	DF	(Greece) Apostolos Toskas	33	1	3	0	1	0	37	1
—	DF	(Greece) Nikos Karapoulitidis	21	0	1	0	0	0	22	0
—	DF	(Greece) Stefanos Theodoridis	23	0	3	0	2	0	28	0
—	DF	(Greece) Kostas Triantafyllou	12	0	3	0	2	0	17	0
—	DF	(Greece) Lefteris Istorios	12	0	1	0	0	0	13	0
Midfielders
—	MF	(Greece) Stelios Skevofilakas	25	1	2	0	0	0	27	1
—	MF	(Greece) Panagiotis Ventouris	26	2	2	0	2	1	30	3
—	MF	(Greece) Nikos Stathopoulos	4	0	2	0	0	0	6	0
—	MF	(Greece) Giorgos Karafeskos	21	2	2	0	2	0	25	2
—	MF	(Greece) Giorgos Lavaridis	24	1	2	0	2	0	28	1
Forwards
—	FW	(Greece) Andreas Papaemmanouil	16	1	1	1	1	0	18	2
—	FW	(Greece) Mimis Papaioannou	28	12	3	4	2	1	33	17
—	FW	(Greece) Spyros Pomonis	27	10	3	0	2	1	32	11
—	FW	(Greece) Kostas Nikolaidis	33	10	3	3	2	1	38	14
—	FW	(Greece) Kostas Chanios	2	0	0	0	0	0	2	0
—	FW	(Greece) Babis Psimogiannos	20	2	0	0	1	0	21	2
—	FW	(Greece) Giorgos Kachris	15	1	2	0	1	0	18	1
—	FW	(Greece) Lakis Nikolaou	31	11	2	0	2	0	35	11

=== Goalscorers ===
As of 11 June 1972
The list is sorted by competition order when total goals are equal, then by position and then alphabetically by surname.

Rank	Pos.	Player	Alpha Ethniki	Greek Cup	European Cup	Total
1	FW	(Greece) Mimis Papaioannou	12	4	1	17
2	FW	(Greece) Kostas Nikolaidis	10	3	1	14
3	FW	(Greece) Lakis Nikolaou	11	0	0	11
3	FW	(Greece) Spyros Pomonis	10	0	1	11
5	MF	(Greece) Panagiotis Ventouris	2	0	1	3
6	MF	(Greece) Giorgos Karafeskos	2	0	0	2
6	FW	(Greece) Babis Psimogiannos	2	0	0	2
6	FW	(Greece) Andreas Papaemmanouil	1	1	0	2
9	DF	(Greece) Apostolos Toskas	1	0	0	1
9	DF	(Greece) Giorgos Kefalidis	1	0	0	1
9	MF	(Greece) Giorgos Lavaridis	1	0	0	1
9	MF	(Greece) Stelios Skevofilakas	1	0	0	1
9	FW	(Greece) Giorgos Kachris	1	0	0	1
Own goals			2	0	0	2
Totals			57	8	4	69

=== Hat-tricks ===
Numbers in superscript represent the goals that the player scored.

Player	Against	Result	Date	Competition	Source
(Greece) Lakis Nikolaou	(Greece) Pierikos	5–0 (H)	4 June 1972	Alpha Ethniki	

=== Clean sheets ===
As of 11 June 1972
The list is sorted by competition order when total clean sheets are equal and then alphabetically by surname. Clean sheets in games where both goalkeepers participated are awarded to the goalkeeper who started the game. Goalkeepers with no appearances are not included.

Rank	Player	Alpha Ethniki	Greek Cup	European Cup	Total
1	(Greece) Stelios Serafidis	11	1	0	12
2	(Greece) Stelios Konstantinidis	6	0	0	6
3	(Greece) Kostas Silivistras	0	0	0	0
Totals		17	1	0	18

=== Disciplinary record ===
As of 11 June 1972

N	P	Nat.	Name	Alpha Ethniki			Greek Cup			European Cup			Total			Notes
N	P	Nat.	Name	Yellow card	Second yellow card	Red card	Yellow card	Second yellow card	Red card	Yellow card	Second yellow card	Red card	Yellow card	Second yellow card	Red card	Notes
Goalkeepers
—	GK	(Greece)	Stelios Serafidis													
—	GK	(Greece)	Stelios Konstantinidis													
—	GK	(Greece)	Kostas Silivistras													
Defenders
—	DF	(Greece)	Giorgos Kefalidis													
—	DF	(Greece)	Giorgos Tanidis													
—	DF	(Greece)	Apostolos Toskas									1			1	
—	DF	(Greece)	Nikos Karapoulitidis													
—	DF	(Greece)	Stefanos Theodoridis													
—	DF	(Greece)	Kostas Triantafyllou													
—	DF	(Greece)	Lefteris Istorios													
Midfielders
—	MF	(Greece)	Stelios Skevofilakas													
—	MF	(Greece)	Panagiotis Ventouris													
—	MF	(Greece)	Nikos Stathopoulos													
—	MF	(Greece)	Giorgos Karafeskos													
—	MF	(Greece)	Giorgos Lavaridis													
Forwards
—	FW	(Greece)	Andreas Papaemmanouil													
—	FW	(Greece)	Mimis Papaioannou													
—	FW	(Greece)	Spyros Pomonis	1						1			2			
—	FW	(Greece)	Kostas Nikolaidis													
—	FW	(Greece)	Kostas Chanios													
—	FW	(Greece)	Babis Psimogiannos													
—	FW	(Greece)	Giorgos Kachris													
—	FW	(Greece)	Lakis Nikolaou													

=== Starting 11 ===
This section presents the most frequently used formation along with the players with the most starts across all competitions.

N.	Formation	Matchday(s)
32	4–2–4	3–17, 20–29, 31–34
7	4–3–3	1, 2, 18, 19, 30

Nat.	Player	Pos.
(Greece)	Stelios Serafidis	GK
(Greece)	Apostolos Toskas	RCB
(Greece)	Giorgos Lavaridis	LCB
(Greece)	Stefanos Theodoridis	RB
(Greece)	Nikos Karapoulitidis	LB
(Greece)	Panagiotis Ventouris	RCM
(Greece)	Stelios Skevofilakas	LCM
(Greece)	Lakis Nikolaou	RW
(Greece)	Spyros Pomonis	LW
(Greece)	Mimis Papaioannou (C)	RCF
(Greece)	Kostas Nikolaidis	LCF

Last updated: 1972-06-11
