= Tanidis =

Tanidis is a surname. Notable people with the surname include:

- Giorgos Tanidis
- Alexandros Tanidis
