= 1972–73 Alpha Ethniki =

37th season of top-tier football league in Greece

Alpha Ethniki
- Season: 1972–73
- Champions: Olympiacos; 18th Greek title
- Relegated: Kalamata; Atromitos; Trikala; Omonia
- European Cup: Olympiacos
- Cup Winners' Cup: PAOK
- UEFA Cup: Panathinaikos; Panachaiki
- Matches: 306
- Goals: 705 (2.3 per match)
- Top goalscorer: Antonis Antoniadis (22 goals)

The 1972–73 Alpha Ethniki was the 37th season of the highest football league of Greece. The season began on 17 September 1972 and ended on 3 June 1973. Olympiacos won their 18th Greek title and their first one in six years.

The point system was: Win: 3 points - Draw: 2 points - Loss: 1 point.

== Teams ==
Promoted from 1971–72 Beta Ethniki	Relegated from 1971–72 Alpha Ethniki
Kalamata; Atromitos; Panserraikos	Veria; Pierikos; Apollon Athens; Olympiakos Nicosia
Promoted from 1971–72 Cypriot First Division	Veria; Pierikos; Apollon Athens; Olympiakos Nicosia
Omonia	Veria; Pierikos; Apollon Athens; Olympiakos Nicosia

Location of teams in 1972–73 Alpha Ethniki

== League table ==
Pos	Team	Pld	W	D	L	GF	GA	GD	Pts	Qualification or relegation
1	Olympiacos (C)	34	27	6	1	72	13	+59	94	Qualification for European Cup first round
2	PAOK	34	27	4	3	75	24	+51	92	Qualification for Cup Winners' Cup first round (Note: Since Olympiacos, winners of 1972–73 Greek Football Cup, was qualified for the 1973–74 European Cup, losing cup finalists PAOK earned a spot in the first round of the 1973–74 European Cup Winners' Cup.)
3	Panathinaikos (Note: Panathinaikos were deducted 3 points and had 3 games penalty.)	34	22	7	5	89	29	+60	82	Qualification for UEFA Cup first round
4	Panachaiki	34	16	12	6	42	27	+15	78	Qualification for UEFA Cup first round
5	AEK Athens	34	13	11	10	39	36	+3	71	
6	Ethnikos Piraeus	34	10	15	9	35	32	+3	69	
7	Panionios	34	13	9	12	41	39	+2	69	
8	Iraklis	34	11	13	10	42	39	+3	69	
9	Aris	34	13	9	12	38	36	+2	69	
10	Kavala	34	8	14	12	32	38	−6	64	
11	Egaleo	34	11	8	15	30	47	−17	64	
12	Olympiacos Volos	34	10	9	15	25	42	−17	63	
13	Fostiras	34	10	8	16	23	39	−16	62	
14	Panserraikos	34	6	15	13	27	47	−20	61	
15	Kalamata (R)	34	8	10	16	30	45	−15	60	Relegation to Beta Ethniki
16	Atromitos (R)	34	7	10	17	17	49	−32	58	Relegation to Beta Ethniki
17	Trikala (R)	34	5	9	20	26	52	−26	53	Relegation to Beta Ethniki
18	Omonia (Note: Omonia were deducted 1 point.) (R)	34	1	7	26	22	71	−49	42	Moving to Cypriot First Division

Source: RSSSF
Rules for classification: 1st points; 2nd decision match; 3rd head-to-head goal difference.
(C) Champions; (R) Relegated

== Results ==
Home \ Away	AEK	ARIS	ATR	EGA	ETH	FOS	IRA	KAL	KAV	OLY	OLV	OMO	PNC	PAO	PAN	PNS	PAOK	TRI
AEK Athens		3–1	1–0	1–0	1–0	3–0	2–2	2–0	1–1	1–5	2–0	1–0	1–1	0–2	0–0	2–1	0–2	5–1
Aris	2–0		0–0	4–1	0–0	4–1	0–0	2–1	1–0	0–2	1–0	5–0	0–0	0–0	1–0	1–0	1–2	3–2
Atromitos	1–0	0–0		0–1	1–1	1–0	1–1	1–0	1–1	0–1	0–0	2–0	1–0	0–4	3–0	0–0	0–2	1–0
Egaleo	1–2	0–2	3–0		0–1	2–1	1–1	1–0	2–1	0–0	3–0	3–1	1–1	2–0 (Note: Egaleo-Panathinaikos 2-0 awarded without a game (Panathinaikos' penalty).)	2–0	0–1	2–2	1–0
Ethnikos Piraeus	0–0	2–0	0–0	2–0		1–1	1–1	2–0	2–1	1–2	2–0	1–1	0–0	0–1	0–0	2–0	2–3	1–0
Fostiras	2–1	2–1	1–0	0–0	1–1		2–1	2–0	1–1	1–3	1–0	2–1	0–1	1–1	0–1	0–0	1–0	1–0
Iraklis	1–1	1–0	4–1	3–0	2–2	1–0		2–0	1–1	0–1	0–0	2–1	1–0	3–3	1–3	0–0	1–3	3–0
Kalamata	0–0	0–0	2–0	2–0	1–1	2–1	2–2		1–0	1–2	0–1	3–0	2–1	0–2	0–1	2–1	0–3	2–0
Kavala	0–1	3–1	3–0	1–0	0–2	1–0	0–2	1–1		1–1	1–1	4–0	0–0	1–1	1–1	3–0	0–2	2–1
Olympiacos	2–0	2–1	4–0	3–0	3–0	3–0	1–0	3–1	0–0		3–0	1–1	2–0	2–0 (Note: Olympiacos-Panathinaikos suspended at 81' at 3-2, 2-0 awarded.)	4–1	6–0	1–0	5–0
Olympiacos Volos	1–1	0–1	1–0	0–0	1–0	1–0	1–0	2–2	1–2	1–2		1–0	0–1	0–0	1–0	1–1	1–5	2–0
Omonia	2–4	1–2	0–0	2–2	1–2	0–1	0–1	1–1	1–0	1–2	1–2		1–1	0–2 (Note: Omonia-Panathinaikos suspended at halftime at 0-0, 0-2 awarded.)	0–3	0–1	1–3	0–1
Panachaiki	1–1	0–0	1–0	2–0	1–0	2–0	2–0	2–0	3–1	0–0	3–0	4–0		0–4	2–0	1–0	2–2	2–1
Panathinaikos	3–1	7–1	8–1	5–0	2–1	2–0	3–1	2–2	5–0	0–1	6–3	4–2	5–1		1–0	4–1	0–2 (Note: Panathinaikos-PAOK 0-2 awarded without a game (Panathinaikos' penalty).)	3–0
Panionios	2–1	3–2	2–0	5–0	2–2	1–0	0–1	3–1	0–0	0–2	1–1	3–1	0–0	0–6		4–0	0–0	2–1
Panserraikos	2–0	2–1	1–1	0–1	1–1	0–0	1–1	1–1	1–1	1–1	2–1	0–0	1–1	1–1	2–1		1–3	1–2
PAOK	0–0	1–0	2–1	4–1	3–0	3–0	4–1	3–0	3–0	1–0	1–0	3–1	3–5	1–0	2–1	2–1		4–0
Trikala	0–0	0–0	5–0	0–0	2–2	0–0	2–1	0–0	0–0	0–2	0–1	4–1	0–1	1–2	1–1	2–2	0–1	

Source: RSSSF
Legend: Blue = home team win; Yellow = draw; Red = away team win.

== Top scorers ==
Rank	Player	Club	Goals
1	(Greece) Antonis Antoniadis	Panathinaikos	22
2	(Greece) Stavros Sarafis	PAOK	19
3	(France) Yves Triantafyllos	Olympiacos	16
4	(Greece) Kostas Davourlis	Panachaiki	15
4	(Greece) Koulis Apostolidis	PAOK	15
4	(Greece) Andreas Michalopoulos	Panachaiki	15
7	(Argentina) Juan Ramón Verón	Panathinaikos	14
7	(Greece) Giorgos Koudas	PAOK	14
9	(France) Romain Argyroudis	Olympiacos	13

== Attendances ==
Olympiacos drew the highest average home attendance in the 1972–73 Alpha Ethniki.

#	Team	Average attendance
1	Olympiacos	36,817
2	PAOK	23,902
3	Panathinaikos	22,725
4	AEK Athens	16,802
5	Ethnikos Piraeus	10,616
6	Aris	10,032
7	Iraklis	9,982
8	Panionios	8,793
9	Panachaiki	7,569
10	Omonia	7,153
11	Kavala	6,534
12	Egaleo	5,588
13	Kalamata	5,570
14	Olympiacos Volos	5,264
15	Panserraikos	5,116
16	Atromitos	4,804
17	Fostiras	4,416
18	Trikala	3,954
