= Giannis Dandelis =

Greek footballer

Personal information
- Full name: Ioannis Dandelis
- Date of birth: 31 May 1945 (age 81)
- Place of birth: Komotini, Greece
- Position: Striker

Senior career*
Years	Team	Apps	(Gls)
1969–1972	Veria		(43)
1971–1972	→ Leonidas Sparta (loan)		
1972–1973	AEK Athens	26	(7)
1973–1975	Panachaiki	36	(8)
- * Club domestic league appearances and goals

Giannis Dandelis (Greek: Γιάννης Δανδέλης; born 31 May 1945) is a former Greek professional footballer who played as a striker.

== Club career ==
Dandelis began his career at Veria, where he had a great impact in the late 60s and early 70s, winning the promotion in the first division in 1970. In the following season AEK Athens were persisting for his transfer having the player on their side, but Veria were not keen for the move and Dandelis was left out of the team. On 22 December 1971 he was loaned to Leonidas Sparta for the rest of the season. Eventually on 30 June 1972 Dandelis was transferred to AEK for the amount of 540,000 drachmas and Dimitris Palasidis as an exchange. He was intended to be used as a back-up option for the offensive duo of Mimis Papaioannou and Kostas Nikolaidis. Moreover, at the same period AEK also signed the Argentinian forwards, Hugo Horacio Zerr and Rodolfo Vicente that made the competition for a place in the squad's offense more difficult. Nevertheless, Dandelis managed to establish himself in the main squad. With the yellow-blacks he competed in the UEFA Cup, playing in the away match of the first round against Salgótarján and at both legs against Liverpool for the second round. On 27 January 1973, in the home match against Fostiras he scored a hat-trick and shaped the final 3–0 for AEK.

In the following season Dandelis was released from the club and signed for Panachaiki, where he played for two seasons. With the team of Patras he made another 3 appearances in the 1973–74 UEFA Cup, where they played against GAK for the first round and Twente in the second round.

== Honours ==
Veria

- Beta Ethniki: 1969–70 (Group 3)
