= Romain Argyroudis =

French-Greek footballer (born 1946)

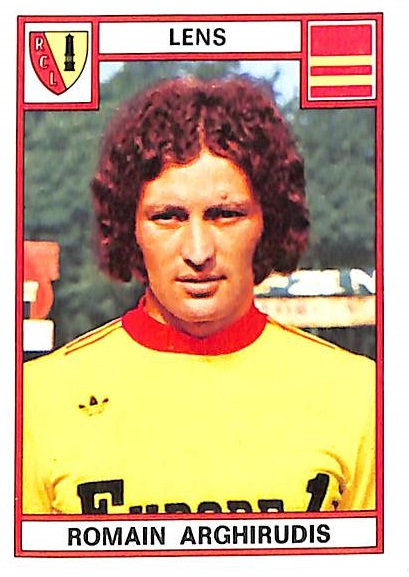

Personal information
- Full name: Romain Argyroudis
- Date of birth: 6 November 1946 (age 79)
- Place of birth: Mulhouse, France
- Position: Striker

Senior career*
Years	Team	Apps	(Gls)
- Mulhouse
1968–1969	Lens		
1969–1971	Nice		
1971–1973	Olympiacos	50	(21)
1973–1979	Lens		
- * Club domestic league appearances and goals

Romain Argyroudis (born 6 November 1946) is a French former footballer of Greek descent who played for clubs in both countries.

A forward in the 1960s and 1970s, Argyroudis played for a number of clubs in France, including Mulhouse, Lens (two spells, 1968 to 1969 and 1973 to 1979) and Nice (1969 to 1971). In 1971, he along with fellow French-Greek forward Yves Triantafillos joined Greek club Olympiacos. In the 1972–73 season he won the double with Olympiacos. He left the club at the end of the season and rejoined Lens.

== Personal life ==
His grandfather was from Eptanese in Greece and emigrated to Montevideo. His grandmother was Uruguayan, while his mother is French.
