= Néstor Errea =

Argentine footballer (1939–2005)

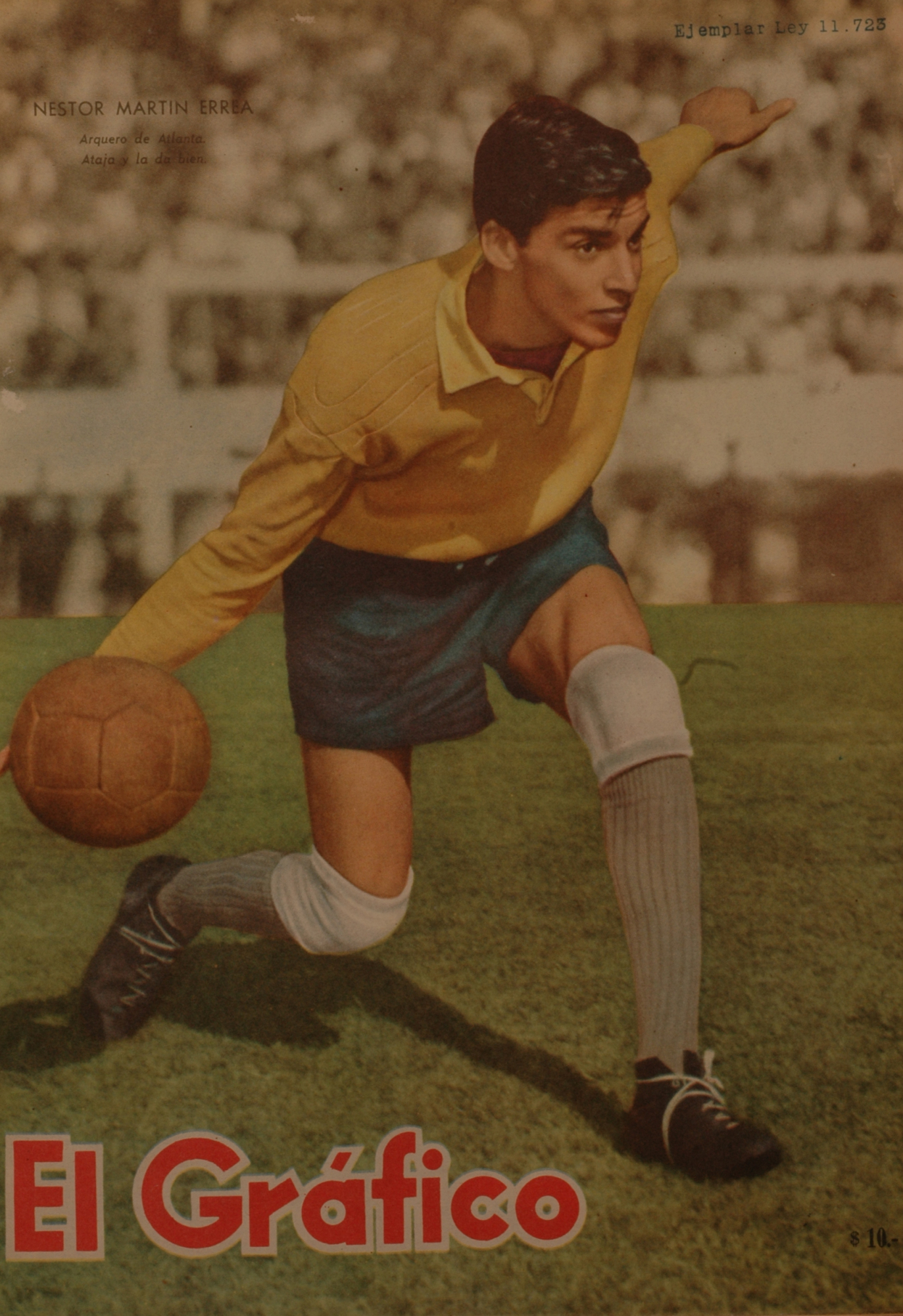
- Néstor Martín Errea (1960)

Personal information
- Full name: Néstor Martín Errea
- Date of birth: 27 April 1939
- Place of birth: Buenos Aires, Argentina
- Date of death: 3 June 2005 (aged 66)
- Place of death: Athens, Greece
- Height: 1.83 m (6 ft 0 in)
- Position: Goalkeeper

Youth career
- –1959: Sacachispas

Senior career*
Years	Team	Apps	(Gls)
1959–1962	Atlético Atlanta	66	(0)
1962–1965	Boca Juniors	19	(0)
1966–1967	Colón	43	(0)
1967	Peñarol		
1968	Boca Juniors	3	(0)
1969–1970	Estudiantes	26	(0)
1971	Banfield	36	(0)
1972–1975	AEK Athens	42	(0)
1975–1977	Apollon Athens	36	(0)
1977–1978	Chalkida	35	(0)
Total		306	(0)

International career
1959–1961	Argentina	2	(0)
- * Club domestic league appearances and goals

Néstor Errea (27 April 1939 – 3 June 2005) was an Argentine professional footballer who played as a goalkeeper. His nickname was "El Flaco" (English: "The Skinny") because of his tall, slender physique.

He spent most of his career in Argentina, playing for clubs including Boca Juniors, Colón and Estudiantes, winning multiple league titles and two Copa Libertadores. He also played in Greece for AEK Athens, Apollon Athens and Chalkida. Furthermore he made two appearances for the Argentina.

== Club career ==
=== Argentina and Uruguay ===
Errea started football at an amateur level at Sacachispas in the Villa Soldati region of Buenos Aires. His professional career began in 1959 when he joined Atlético Atlanta. He played there until 1962 and then joined Boca Juniors, where he won 3 Championships. In 1966 he signed for Colón playing for a year before he traveled to Uruguay to play for Peñarol, where during his short spell he managed to win an Uruguayan Primera División in 1967. Afterwards he made his return at Boca Juniors in 1968. In 1969 he signed for Estudiantes and in his only season at the club he won the Copa Libertadores two consecutive times and play in the 1970 Intercontinental Cup, where they lost 3–2 on aggregate to Feyenoord. In 1971 he played for Banfield for a year.

=== Greece ===
In the summer of 1972, the transfers of Latin American footballers to Greece according to the current of the time, brought Errea to AEK Athens, alongside Rodolfo Vicente and Hugo Zeer. In his first season he was the main goalkeeper of the team, while in his second season he shared the spot with the newcomer Giorgos Sidiropoulos. In the summer of 1974 AEK signed the Germans, Walter Wagner and Timo Zahnleiter, who occupied the foreign player slots in the squad. Consequently, Errea was ineligible to compete with the club in official matches throughout the season, despite the efforts of the president, Loukas Barlos. On 28 July 1975, he signed for the newly-promoted Apollon Athens, where he played until 1977, when he moved to AO Chalkida to end his career in 1978.

== International career ==
He played in two matches for Argentina in 1959 and 1961. He made his debut on 9 December 1959 in Argentina's 4–2 win over Paraguay for the 1959 South American Championship that took place in Ecuador, setting a record for the youngest player to appear in the national team. In 1961 he was called up again, where he played for the last time in a 4–1 away defeat by Italy on 15 June.

== After football ==
Errea quickly acclimatized in Greece and after obtaining Greek citizenship in 1977, he stayed permanently in the country. For most of his stay, he lived in Larissa. Errea died on 3 June 2005, after suffering a severe stroke for which he was hospitalized at the "Asclepion" hospital at Voula.

== Honours ==
Boca Juniors

- Argentine Primera División: 1962, 1964, 1965

Peñarol

- Uruguayan Primera División: 1967

Estudiantes

- Copa Libertadores: 1969, 1970
