= Themis Rigas =

Greek footballer (1945–1984)

Personal information
- Date of birth: 1945
- Place of birth: Patras, Greece
- Date of death: 13 January 1984 (aged 38–39)
- Height: 1.68 m (5 ft 6 in)
- Position: Winger

Youth career
- 1960–1962: Apollon Athens

Senior career*
Years	Team	Apps	(Gls)
1962–1963	Panachaiki		
1963–1964	Olympiakos Patras		
1964–1965	Panachaiki		
1965–1967	Thyella Patras		
1967–1973	Panachaiki	83	(12)
1973	New York Apollo		
1974	→ Toronto Homer (loan)		
1974–1976	Panachaiki	58	(9)
1976	Toronto Metros-Croatia	10	(0)
1976–1977	Patrai		
1977–1979	Panachaiki	24	(2)
- * Club domestic league appearances and goals

Themis Rigas (Greek: Θέμης Ρήγας; 1945 – 13 January 1984), popularly nicknamed The Train, was a Greek footballer born in Patras. One of the fastest and most talented wingers of his generation, he was a member of the Panachaiki football team that impressed Greece in the 1970s and qualified for the 1974 UEFA Cup.

== Career ==
=== Greece ===
Rigas began his career with Panachaiki's youth team and graduated to the senior team in 1962, which competed in the Beta Ethniki. In his initial stages with Panachaiki, he had loan spells with Olympiakos Patras and Thyella Patras.

In 1973, while Panachaiki was competing in the Alpha Ethniki, he helped the club secure a berth for the 1973–74 UEFA Cup. Rigas would appear in the continental tournament, where FC Twente eliminated them.

He had 165 First Division appearances for Panachaiki and scored 23 goals.

=== United States ===
In the summer of 1973, he played in the American Soccer League with the New York Apollo.

=== Canada ===
In 1974, he played abroad in the National Soccer League with Toronto Homer. Rigas scored his first pair of goals for Toronto on May 5, 1974, against the Quebec Selects. He helped the club secure a playoff berth by finishing second in the league standings.

In 1976, Rigas returned to Canada, where he signed with the Toronto Metros-Croatia of the North American Soccer League. He debuted for Toronto on 16 May 1976, against the Tampa Bay Rowdies, where he contributed an assist. Rigas was named to the league's team of the week on 25 May 1976. His stint with Toronto was brief as he was placed on waivers in July 1976.

== Death ==
Rigas died in a domestic accident in 1984, at the age of 39, leaving behind him the family of Panachaiki without one of their most eminent members.

== Notes ==
- Rsssf, website about football statistics
