= Rizos Lellis =

Greek footballer

Personal information
- Full name: Rizos Lellis
- Date of birth: 13 November 1947 (age 78)
- Place of birth: Larissa, Greece
- Height: 1.80 m (5 ft 11 in)
- Position: Defender

Youth career
- –1964: Iraklis Larissa
- 1964: AEL

Senior career*
Years	Team	Apps	(Gls)
1964–1972	AEL	189	(7)
1972–1973	AEK Athens	30	(1)
1973–1976	AEL	75	(1)
Total		294	(9)
- * Club domestic league appearances and goals

Rizos Lellis (Greek: Ρίζος Λέλλης; born 13 November 1947) is a former Greek professional footballer who played as a defender.

== Club career ==
Lellis started playing football at the fields of his village, Anatoli. When he was at his junior high-school years, he and his family were settled to Larissa and thus he enrolled in the youth team of Iraklis Larissa. On 17 May 1964 Iraklis alongside other clubs from Larissa merged and created AEL and thus Lelis became member of the youth team of AEL. In the last two matches of the season, under Alexander Petrovic he was promoted to the men's team and from there onwards became a regular, at the age of 16. His appearances attracted the interest of the big clubs of both Athens and Thessaloniki.

On 6 July 1972, he made the big step of his career and was transferred to AEK Athens for a fee of 1,200,000 drachmas. There, he became a regular in their defense. He also competed in the UEFA Cup, playing at both legs against Salgótarján for the first round and against Liverpool for the second round.

Despite his good performance, Lellis he was released from AEK and on 31 August 1973 he returned to the newly promoted AEL, due to the health issues of his mother. In 1975, when the club faced relegation, he stayed and competed in the second division for a season, before retiring at the young age of 29.

== Personal life ==
Lellis operated an PRO-PO agency in Larissa, since his playing days. After his football career he continued in operating it, until he opened a record store.
