= Alexandros Tanidis =

German footballer

Personal information
- Date of birth: 23 October 1991 (age 35)
- Place of birth: Dachau, Germany
- Height: 1.85 m (6 ft 1 in)
- Position: Centre-back

Senior career*
Years	Team	Apps	(Gls)
2010–2012	Austria Salzburg	13	(0)
2012–2013	1860 Munich II	4	(0)
2013–2014	SV Heimstetten	12	(1)
2014–2015	Victoria Hamburg	27	(7)
2015–2016	LSK Hansa	32	(2)
2016–2017	SG Wattenscheid 09	26	(2)
2017–2018	TuS Erndtebrück	14	(0)
2018	Becamex Bình Dương	12	(1)
2018–2019	PSMS Medan	15	(2)
Total		155	(15)
- * Club domestic league appearances and goals

Alexandros Tanidis (Greek: Αλέξανδρος Τανίδης; born 23 October 1991) is a German former professional footballer who played as a centre-back.

== Personal life ==
Born in Germany, Tanidis is of Greek descent.
