= Tavros Stadium =

Football stadium in Tavros, Athens, Greece

- Spyros Gialampidis Stadium
- Interactive map of Tavros Stadium
- Location: Tavros, Athens, Greece
- Coordinates: 37.9687°N 23.6886°E
- Operator: Fostiras
- Capacity: 4,000
- Surface: Grass
- Field size: 105 x 68 m
- Public transit: Tavros station

Construction
- Built: 1969
- Renovated: 2002

Tenants
- Fostiras; Ethnikos Piraeus (2026–)

Tavros Stadium is a football stadium in Tavros, Athens, Greece. It is the home stadium of Fostiras football team.

== History ==
Tavros Stadium has the name of Spyros Gialampidis, a founder of Fostiras who died in 1994. In 2002 all of its stands were reconstructed due to their age.

== Gallery ==
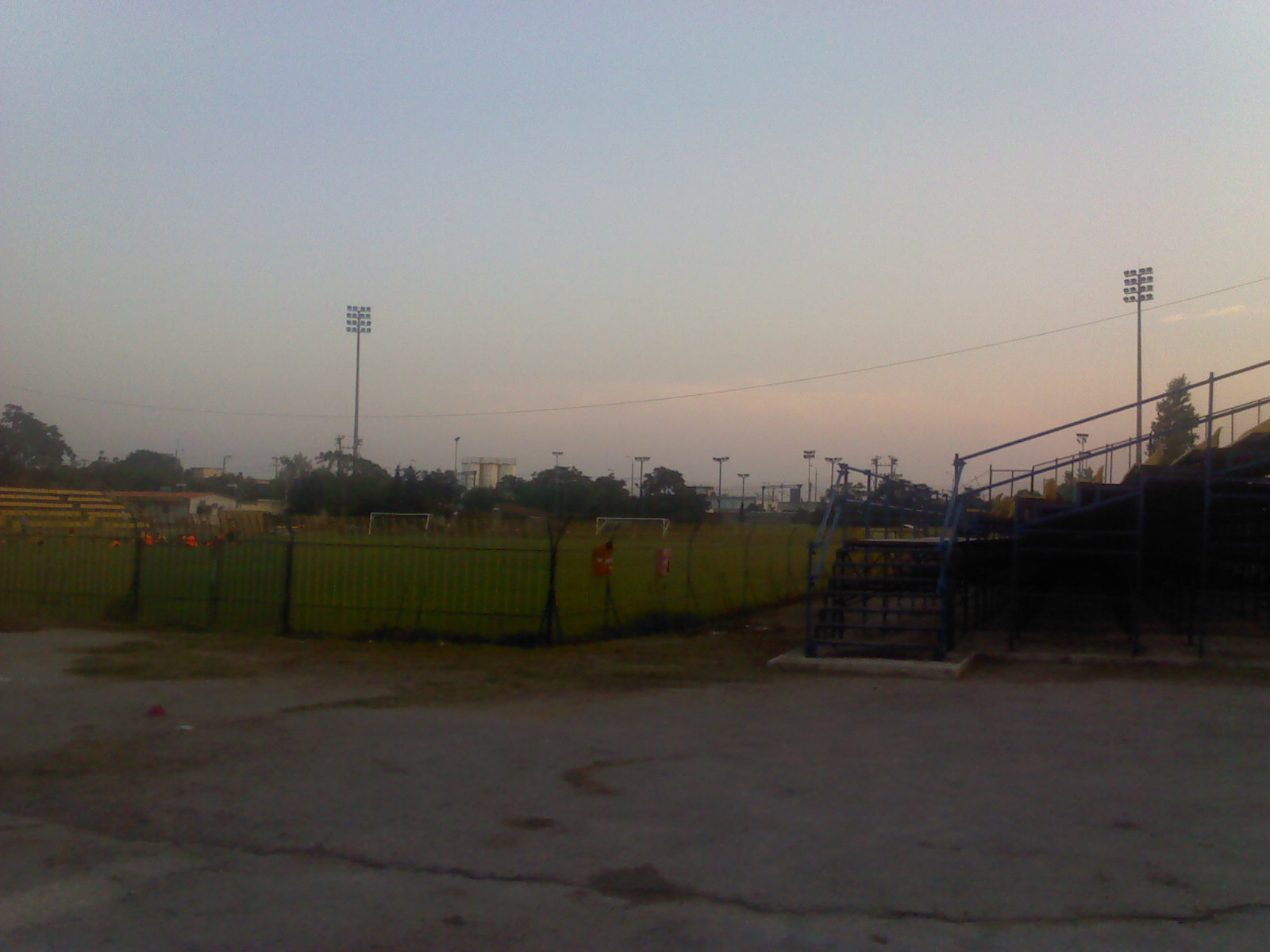
Spyros Gialampidis Stadium
