= Kostas Chatzimichail =

Greek footballer and manager (1932–2024)

Personal information
- Full name: Konstantinos Chatzimichail
- Date of birth: 29 January 1932
- Date of death: 10 May 2024 (aged 92)
- Position: Forward

Youth career
- –1956: AEK Athens

Senior career*
Years	Team	Apps	(Gls)
1956–1959	AEK Athens	7	(2)
1959–1960	Egaleo		
1960–1967	Prasina Poulia (player-manager)		

Managerial career
- 1965: Egaleo (assistant)
- 1969–1970: Achaiki
- 1970–1973: AEK Athens (assistant)
- 1973–1975: AEK Athens Academy
- 1973: AEK Athens (interim)
- 1973–1974: AEK Athens (assistant)
- 1974: AEK Athens (interim)
- 1975–1976: Doxa Drama
- 1977: Niki Volos
- 1978–1979: Doxa Drama
- 1979–1980: Veria
- Greece military
- Kalamata
- 1981–1983: Doxa Drama
- 1983–1984: Kavala
- 1985: Pierikos
- 1986–1987: Kavala
- * Club domestic league appearances and goals

Kostas Chatzimichail (Greek: Κώστας Χατζημιχαήλ; 29 January 1932 – 10 May 2024) was a Greek footballer who played as a forward and a later manager.

== Club career ==
Chatzimichail started playing football at the academies of AEK Athens. He was promoted to the men's team in 1956, where he played for three seasons. In the summer of 1959 he was given as an exchange, as a part of the transfer of Manolis Kanellopoulos from Egaleo, after the suggestion of Tryfon Tzanetis. At the club from Aigaleo, he won the Athens FCA Championship. The following season he moved to Prasina Poulia, where he served as a player-manager until 1967. There, he managed to win the Messinia FCA Championship and the promotion to the second division in 1961.

== Managerial career ==
Chatzimichail served as the assistant of Lefter Küçükandonyadis at Egaleo. In 1969 he was the manager of Achaiki for a season.

On 26 August 1970 Chatzimichail returned to AEK Αthens, where he was hired to replace Giorgos Gasparis as the assistant of Branko Stanković. In 1973 he also replaced Georgios Daispangos in the technical leadership of the club's academies, after the latter's retirement. Chatzimichail served as the manager of the reserve team, for four years continuing the work of Daispangos. On 7 February 1973 after the elimination by Apollon Kalamarias in the Cup, Stanković was fired and Chatzimichail was anointed the interim manager of the men's team. He sat on the bench of AEK once, on 11 February in the 2–0 away defeat against Panserraikos. He remained within the club as an assistant of the next manager, Billy Bingham, while coaching the club's academies until 1975, when he departed from the club.

He continued his career at Doxa Drama, which he took over in the summer of 1975 and left in November 1976. On 15 July 1977 he was appointed at Niki Volos. He returned to Doxa in 1978, where he promoted the club in the first division after 14 years of absence. He left at the beginning of the following season and worked in Veria for one season, the Greek military team and Kalamata, before returning to Doxa Drama with whom he made an admirable run until 1983. His move to Kavala in 1983 which was also admirable, he managed to avoid relegation, despite a 10-point deduction at the start of the season. Under his instructions, they achieved the best defense in the division and finished two points behind the two clubs that won the promotion to the first division. His last spell was at Pierikos in 1985.

== Death ==
Chatzimichail died on 10 May 2024, at the age of 92.

== Honours ==
=== Player ===
Egaleo

- Athens FCA Championship: 1959–60

Prasina Poulia

- Messinia FCA Championship: 1960–61

=== Manager ===
Doxa Drama

- Beta Ethniki: 1978–79
