= Andreas Michalopoulos =

Greek footballer (1948–2022)

Personal information
- Date of birth: 23 February 1948
- Place of birth: Patras, Greece
- Date of death: 4 January 2022 (aged 73)
- Place of death: Patras, Greece
- Height: 1.78 m (5 ft 10 in)
- Position: Striker

Youth career
- –1966: Panionios Patras

Senior career*
Years	Team	Apps	(Gls)
1966–1979	Panachaiki	135	(30)
1979–1980	AO Patra		
1980–1982	Achaiki		

International career
1973	Greece	1	(0)

Managerial career
- 1984–1985: Panachaiki
- 1987: Panachaiki
- 1987–1988: Panserraikos
- 1988–1993: Panachaiki
- 1993–1995: Panionios
- 1995: Skoda Xanthi
- 1996: AEL
- 1996–1997: Panachaiki
- 1998: Proodeftiki
- 1998–1999: Apollon Athens
- 1999–2000: PAS Giannina
- 2000: Apollon Athens
- 2000–2002: Greece U21
- 2003–2004: Apollon Athens
- 2006–2007: Kalamata
- * Club domestic league appearances and goals

Andreas Michalopoulos (Greek: Ανδρέας Μιχαλόπουλος; 23 February 1948 – 4 January 2022) was a Greek footballer who played as a striker for Panachaiki.

== Club career ==
Michalopoulos played for Panachaiki when the team qualified for the 1973–74 UEFA Cup. Before the UEFA Cup game against Grazer AK, an injury seemed to put an early end to his career. Michalopoulos managed to help his team some more years, but he only played 48 games in five seasons until 1979, when he officially retired.

== International career ==
He appeared once for the Greece national team, on 21 February 1973 against Spain. Greece lost 3–1 in the World Cup qualification match. Michalopoulos had 135 Alpha Ethniki appearances with Panachaiki and scored 30 goals.

== Managerial career ==
After the end of his professional career, Michalopoulos coached the Panachaiki senior team in the late 90s as well as at the beginning of the 1996–97 season. He had sat on the bench of many other teams, such as, Panserraikos, Thyella Patras, Skoda Xanthi, AEL, Levadiakos, PAS Giannina, Proodeftiki, Apollon Athens, Greece U21, Panionios and Kalamata.

== Death ==
Michalopoulos died on 4 January 2022, at the age of 73.

== Managerial statistics ==
As of match played 10 January 2023

Team	From	To	Record				
Team	From	To	G	W	D	L	Win %
Panachaiki	1 July 1988	26 June 1993	201	75	45	81	37.3
