= Spyros Kapernekas =

Greek footballer (1948–2021)

Personal information
- Full name: Spyridon Kapernekas
- Date of birth: 10 August 1948
- Place of birth: Kalamata, Greece
- Date of death: 14 December 2021 (aged 73)
- Position: Forward

Senior career*
Years	Team	Apps	(Gls)
1969	Acharnaikos		
1969–1972	Olympiacos	37	(5)
1971–1972	→ Korinthos (loan)		
1972–1976	Aris	65	(15)
- * Club domestic league appearances and goals

Spyros Kapernekas (Greek: Σπύρος Καπερνέκας, 10 August 1948 – 14 December 2021) was a Greek professional football player and later a manager.

== Career ==
A forward, Kapernekas played for Acharnaikos, Olympiacos, Korinthos and Aris. He won the 1970–71 Greek Cup with Olympiacos.

He later worked as a manager for the reserve team of Aris.

He died on 14 December 2021 at the age of 73.

== Honours ==
Olympiacos

- Greek Cup: 1970–71
