= Yves Triantafyllos =

French footballer (born 1948)

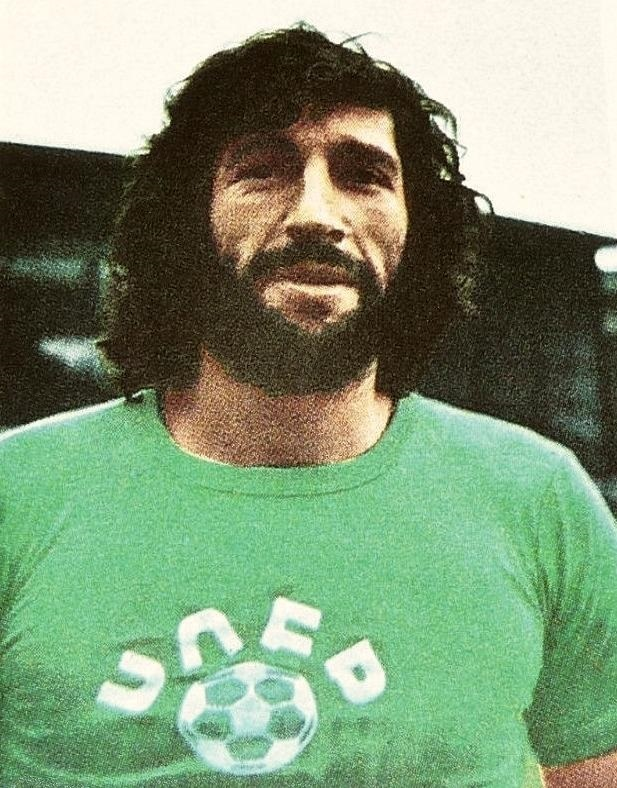
- Triantafyllos in 1974

Personal information
- Date of birth: 27 October 1948 (age 78)
- Place of birth: Montbrison, France
- Height: 1.78 m (5 ft 10 in)
- Position: Striker

Youth career
- 1968–1975: Bourg La Reine

Senior career*
Years	Team	Apps	(Gls)
1966–1968	Saint-Étienne	1	(0)
1968–1969	RC Joinville	63	(25)
1969–1971	Boulogne	55	(34)
1971–1974	Olympiacos	80	(58)
1974–1975	Saint-Étienne	35	(13)
1975–1977	Nantes	31	(9)
1977–1978	Rouen	10	(1)
1978–1980	Kallithea	55	(30)
1980–1982	AS Roanne	47	(16)

International career
1975	France	1	(0)
- * Club domestic league appearances and goals

Yves Triantafyllos (alternative spellings Triantafil(l)os, Triandafyl(l)os, Triandafil(l)os; Greek: Υβ Τριαντάφυλλος; born 27 October 1948) is a French former professional footballer who played as a striker.

Having been part of France's squad for the 1968 Summer Olympics, Triantafyllos made one appearance for the France national team in a friendly against Hungary in 1975.

After returning to AS Saint-Étienne in 1974, Triantafyllos played a decisive role in the club's comeback against Hajduk Split in the 1974–75 European Cup. On 6 November 1974, he scored in the 82nd and 104th minutes as Saint-Étienne overturned a 4–1 first-leg deficit with a 5–1 victory after extra time to advance to the quarter-finals.

== Personal ==
His father was born in Constantinople, and immigrated in France. His mother was French, and his Greek name is Konstantinos.

== Honours ==
Saint-Étienne

- Division 1: 1966–67, 1974–75, 1975–76
- Coupe de France: 1974–75

Nantes

- Division 1: 1976–77

Olympiacos

- Alpha Ethiki: 1972–73, 1973–74
- Greek Cup: 1972–73; runner-up: 1973–74

Individual

- Division 2 Group North top scorer: 1970–71
