= Tavros =

Town in the Athens agglomeration, Greece

Tavros Ταύρος
- Municipal unit
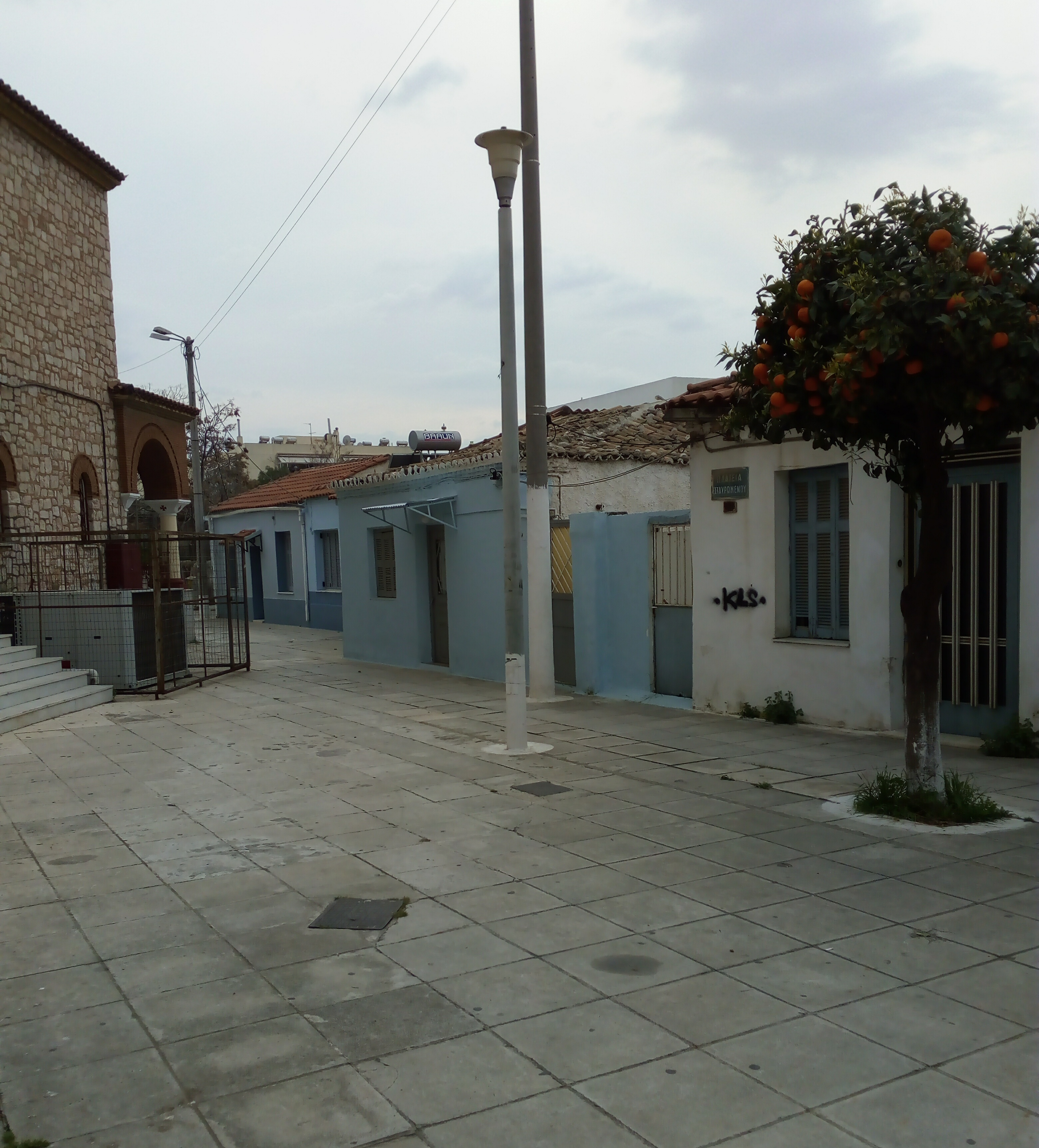

- Location within South Athens regional unit

- Location within Greece
- Coordinates: 37°58′N 23°41.7′E
- Country: Greece
- Administrative region: Attica
- Regional unit: South Athens
- Municipality: Moschato-Tavros

Area
  - Municipal unit: 2.125 km^{2} (0.820 sq mi)
- Elevation: 15 m (49 ft)

Population (2021)
  - Municipal unit: 14,339
  - Municipal unit density: 6,748/km^{2} (17,480/sq mi)
- Time zone: UTC+2 (EET)
  - Summer (DST): UTC+3 (EEST)
- Postal code: 177 78
- Area code: 210
- Vehicle registration: Z
- Website: www.tavros.gr

Tavros (Greek: Ταύρος, lit. 'bull') is a town and a suburb in the southwestern part of the Athens agglomeration, Greece. Since the 2011 local government reform it is part of the municipality Moschato-Tavros, of which it is a municipal unit.

== Geography ==
Tavros is situated 3 km southwest of Athens city centre, 3 km west of the Acropolis of Athens and 5 km northeast of Piraeus. The municipality has an area of 2.125 km^{2}. Its built-up area is continuous with those of Central Athens and the neighbouring suburbs. The main thoroughfare is Peiraios Street, the old road from Athens centre to Piraeus. Tavros has a metro station (Tavros – Eleftherios Venizelos metro station).

== History ==
In the ancient times, the area of Tavros was part of the vast Athenian municipality of Eleonas, extending from Parnitha to the Phallic Breeze, was sparsely populated with few peasant inhabitants whose main occupation was the cultivation of the olive from which it took its name, Tavros was in the NΕ area of the ancient municipality of Eleonas (Greek: Ελαιώνας). The cultivation of the olive continued throughout the Ottoman domination until the middle of the 19th century and the area of Tavros continued to be overwhelmingly covered by olive groves. In the middle of the 19th century many farmers began to create vineyards and orchards instead of olive groves, but the settlement was always of an agricultural nature until the refugees after the 1920s created the present suburb.

The first inhabitants of the new settlement of Tavros were refugees, survivors of the Greek genocide in Asia Minor, who came to the region with the contribution of then Prime Minister Eleftherios Venizelos. The refugees, a few years after their arrival in the area in 1926, as people who were very active in sport, founded the football association Fostiras, which soon emerged as one of the largest football clubs in Attica.

Until 1934, the present Tavros was part of the municipality of Athens and then it was detached as an autonomous community called Nea Sfageia (Greek: Νέα Σφαγεία). In 1972 Nea Sfageia became a municipality and renamed to Tavros by refugee residents as a reminder of their place of origin, the mountain range of the Tavros in Asia Minor.

The Asia Minor refugees built a number of churches and chapels such as Saint George in the centre of the city, where they transported pieces of relics of St. Demetrius and Saint Nestor as well as the miraculous icon of St. Demetrius the Myroblyte from the district of Derk in Istanbul. The sacred temple of the Crucified is also at the centre a little further north of the OSE lines, erected in 1960 and celebrated every 14 September at the Feast of the Holy Cross, feasts around the temple site. The Temple of the Crucified is known for its many charitable activities. Also the refugees from Asia Minor brought from Antalya the icon of Panagia Attaliotissa or Jigo-Panagia as they called it and placed it from 1929 in the Holy Temple of the Assumption of the Blessed Virgin, built on the initiative of the Association of Atheliots and Alaiots. The feast of "Jigo-Panagia" in Tavros, Athens, takes place each year on the Sunday of Myrrh-bearing Women as well as in Antalya, Asia Minor.

The new inhabitants replaced the olives and the vineyards with vegetable gardens, and after the 1950s due to the great industrial development and the proximity to Rentis and the Central Vegetable Market of Athens, Tavros quickly developed into an industrial area. In 1975, a ministerial order banned livestock farming in the area, since then the settlement was converted into industrial but is still sparsely populated with housing. Keeping the stream of Prophet Elijah allows the Tavros area to retain some elements from its old character. Many churches like Zoodochos Pigi (Greek: Ζωοδόχος Πηγή) have been built very close to the stream.

== Sports ==
Tavros hosts the clubs Fostiras F.C. with earlier presence in A Ethniki and Ajax Tavrou with earlier presence in Delta Ethniki

Sport clubs based in Tavros
Club	Founded	Sports	Achievements
Fostiras F.C.	1926	Football	Earlier presence in A Ethniki
Ajax Tavrou	1981	Football	Earlier presence in Delta Ethniki

== Historical population ==
Year	Population
1981	16,514
1991	15,456
2001	14,963
2011	14,972
2021	14,339

== Notable people ==
- Maria Dimitriadi (1950–2009), singer

== See also ==
- List of municipalities of Attica
