= 1972–73 Greek Football Cup =

1972–73 Greek Cup
Tournament details
- Country: Greece
- Teams: 78

Final positions
- Champions: Olympiacos (15th title)
- Runners-up: PAOK

Tournament statistics
- Matches played: 75
- Goals scored: 208 (2.77 per match)
- Top goal scorer(s): Thanasis Intzoglou (5 goals)

The 1972–73 Greek Football Cup was the 31st edition of the Greek Football Cup. The competition culminated with the Greek Cup Final, held at Karaiskakis Stadium, on 17 June 1973. The match was contested by Olympiacos and PAOK, with Olympiacos winning by 1–0.

== Calendar ==
Round	Date(s)	Fixtures	Clubs	New entries
Qualifying Round	10 September 1972	14	78 → 64	28
First Round	15 October, 6 December 1972	31	64 → 32	50
Round of 32	3 January 1973	15	32 → 16	none
Round of 16	7 February 1973	8	16 → 8	none
Quarter-finals	18 April 1973	4	8 → 4	none
Semi-finals	23 May 1973	2	4 → 2	none
Final	17 June 1973	1	2 → 1	none

== Qualifying round ==
28 clubs from Beta Ethniki entered the qualification round.

Team 1	Score	Team 2
Apollon Athens	0–0 (4–5 p)	Egaleo
Acharnaikos	1–2 (a.e.t.)	Fostiras
Kallithea	1–0	P.A.O. Rouf
Ionikos	2–0 (a.e.t.)	Vyzas Megara
Kalamata	0–1	Proodeftiki
Panachaiki	5–0	Atromitos Piraeus
OFI	2–4	Rodos
Paniliakos	0–1	Korinthos
Apollon Kalamarias	1–0	Veria
Doxa Drama	1–4	Kavala
AEL	1–2 (a.e.t.)	Pierikos
Kastoria	1–2	Makedonikos
Niki Volos	0–1	Anagennisi Karditsa
Kerkyra	0–1	PAS Giannina

== Knockout phase ==
In the knockout phase, teams play against each other over a single match. If the match ends up as a draw, extra time will be played. If a winner doesn't occur after the extra time the winner emerges by penalty shoot-out.
The mechanism of the draws for each round is as follows:

- In the draw for the first round, the teams from the first division are seeded and the teams that passed the qualification round are unseeded. The seeded teams are drawn against the unseeded teams in their respective region. (The teams from Southern Greece form the first group and the teams from Central and Northern Greece form the second group.)
- In the draw for the Round of 32, there are no seedings and teams from the different group can be drawn against each other in their respective region.
- In the draws for the Round of 16 onwards, there are no geographical criteria and teams from different regions can be drawn against each other.

== Bracket ==
First round
Rodos	4
Phoebus Kremasti	2
Olympiacos	5
Koropi	0
PAS Giannina	3
Anagennisi Karditsa	0
Anagennisi Arta	4
A.F.C. Patra	3
Panargiakos	1
Panaspropyrgiakos	0
Panegialios	1
Kallithea	3
Naoussa (a.e.t.)	2
Makedonikos	0
Pierikos	1
Anagennisi Giannitsa	0
A.O. Karditsa (a.e.t.)	1
Kilkisiakos	0
Florina (a.e.t.)	2
Pyrsos Grevena	1
Panionios	2
Omonia Nicosia	1
Aias Salamina	0
Panachaiki	1
Xanthi	1(4)
Pandramaikos (p)	1(5)
Apollon Krya Vrisi	1
Iraklis	2
Chalkida	0
Levadiakos	1
Aris	2
Moudania	0
Fostiras	3
Atromitos	0
Proodeftiki	2
Pannemeatikos	0
Anagennisi Epanomi	0
PAOK	3
Olympiacos Volos (a.e.t.)	2
Panserraikos	1
Argonaftis	4
Ilisiakos	3
Panathinaikos	2
Petralona	0
Egaleo	0
Panelefsiniakos	1
Chania	0
Ionikos (w/o)	2
Thiva	0
Trikala	2
Kavala (a.e.t.)	3
Panthrakikos	2
Pannafpliakos	0
Ethnikos Piraeus	3
Asteras Amaliada (p)	0(3)
Ikaros Nea Smyrni	0(2)
Almopos Aridea	0
Apollon Kalamarias (a.e.t.)	1
Edessaikos	0
Foinikas Polichni	1
AEK Athens	2
Korinthos	0
Ethnikos Asteras	2
Orfeas Egaleo	1

Round of 32
Rodos	0
Olympiacos	3
PAS Giannina	2
Anagennisi Arta	1
Panargiakos (a.e.t.)	2
Kallithea	1
Naoussa (p)	1(4)
Pierikos	1(1)
A.O. Karditsa (w/o)	2
Florina	0
Panionios	3
Panachaiki	2
Pandramaikos (p)	0(3)
Iraklis	0(1)
Levadiakos	1
Aris	0
Fostiras	7
Proodeftiki	0
PAOK	5
Olympiacos Volos	1
Argonaftis	0
Panathinaikos	2
Panelfsiniakos	2
Ionikos	1
Trikala	1(1)
Kavala (p)	1(4)
Ethnikos Piraeus	6
Asteras Amaliada	0
Apollon Kalamarias	2
Foinikas Polichni	0
AEK Athens	9
Ethnikos Asteras	0

Round of 16
Olympiacos	1
PAS Giannina	0
Panargiakos (p)	0(4)
Naoussa	0(3)
A.O. Karditsa	0
Panionios	2
Pandramaikos	2
Levadiakos	0
Fostiras	1
PAOK (a.e.t.)	2
Panathinaikos	3
Panelefsiniakos	0
Kavala	0
Ethnikos Piraeus (a.e.t.)	1
Apollon Kalamarias	2
AEK Athens	1

Quarter-finals
Olympiacos	3
Panargiakos	2
Panionios	5
Pandramaikos	0
PAOK	2
Panathinaikos	0
Ethnikos Piraeus (p)	1(4)
Apollon Kalamarias	1(3)

Semi-finals
Olympiacos	2
Panionios	1
PAOK (a.e.t.)	3
Ethnikos Piraeus	2

Final
Olympiacos	1
PAOK	0

== First round ==
18 clubs from Alpha Ethniki and 32 clubs from Beta Ethniki entered the first round.

Team 1	Score	Team 2
Olympiacos	5–0	Koropi
Egaleo	0–1 (a.e.t.)	Panelefsiniakos
Fostiras	3–0	Atromitos
Aias Salamina	0–1	Panachaiki
Panathinaikos	2–0	Petralona
Proodeftiki	2–0	Pannemeatikos
AEK Athens	2–0	Korinthos
Panegialios	1–3	Kallithea
Asteras Amaliada	0–0 (3–2 p)	Ikaros Nea Smyrni
Panionios	2–1	Omonia Nicosia
Argonaftis	4–3	Ilisiakos
Rodos	4–2	Phoebus Kremasti
Ethnikos Asteras	2–1	Orfeas Egaleo
Panargiakos	1–0	Panaspropyrgiakos
Pannafpliakos	0–3	Ethnikos Piraeus
Chania	0–2 (w/o)	Ionikos
Anagennisi Arta	4–3	A.F.C. Patra
Olympiacos Volos	2–1 (a.e.t.)	Panserraikos
Kavala	3–2 (a.e.t.)	Panthrakikos
Apollon Krya Vrisi	1–2	Iraklis
Thiva	0–2	Trikala
PAS Giannina	3–0	Anagennisi Karditsa
Naoussa	2–0 (a.e.t.)	Makedonikos
Aris	2–0	Moudania
A.O. Karditsa	1–0 (a.e.t.)	Kilkisiakos
Pierikos	1–0	Anagennisi Giannitsa
Florina	2–1 (a.e.t.)	Pyrsos Grevena
Almopos Aridea	0–1 (a.e.t.)	Apollon Kalamarias
Xanthi	1–1 (4–5 p)	Pandramaikos
Chalkida	0–1	Levadiakos
Anagennisi Epanomi	0–3	PAOK
Edessaikos	0–1	Foinikas Polichni

== Round of 32 ==
Team 1	Score	Team 2
Ethnikos Piraeus	6–0	Asteras Amaliada
Argonaftis	0–2	Panathinaikos
Fostiras	7–0	Proodeftiki
Panionios	3–2	Panachaiki
AEK Athens	9–0	Ethnikos Asteras
Panargiakos	2–1 (a.e.t.)	Kallithea
Rodos	0–3	Olympiacos
Panelfsiniakos	2–1	Ionikos
PAOK	5–1	Olympiacos Volos
Naoussa	1–1 (4–1 p)	Pierikos
Apollon Kalamarias	2–0	Foinikas Polichni
Pandramaikos	0–0 (3–1 p)	Iraklis
Levadiakos	1–0	Aris
Trikala	1–1 (1–4 p)	Kavala
A.O. Karditsa	2–0 (w/o)	Florina
PAS Giannina	2–1	Anagennisi Arta

== Round of 16 ==
Team 1	Score	Team 2
Olympiacos	1–0	PAS Giannina
Fostiras	1–2 (a.e.t.)	PAOK
Panathinaikos	3–0	Panelefsiniakos
Apollon Kalamarias	2–1	AEK Athens
Kavala	0–1 (a.e.t.)	Ethnikos Piraeus
A.O. Karditsa	0–2	Panionios
Panargiakos	0–0 (4–3 p)	Naoussa
Pandramaikos	2–0	Levadiakos

== Quarter-finals ==
Team 1	Score	Team 2
Panionios	5–0	Pandramaikos
PAOK	2–0	Panathinaikos
Olympiacos	3–2	Panargiakos
Ethnikos Piraeus	1–1 (4–3 p)	Apollon Kalamarias

== Semi-finals ==
Team 1	Score	Team 2
Olympiacos	2–1	Panionios
PAOK	3–2 (a.e.t.)	Ethnikos Piraeus

== Final ==
17 June 1973
20:30 EET

Olympiacos	1–0	PAOK
Angelis 46'	Report

Karaiskakis Stadium, Piraeus
Attendance: 40,070
Referee: Vital Loraux (Belgium)
