= Giorgos Tanidis =

Greek footballer (1946–2016)

- Giorgos Tanidis with AEK Athens

Personal information
- Full name: Georgios Tanidis
- Date of birth: 25 December 1946
- Place of birth: Ptolemaida, Greece
- Date of death: 3 June 2016 (aged 69)
- Place of death: Rhodes, Greece
- Position: Centre-back

Senior career*
Years	Team	Apps	(Gls)
1962–1971	Aris Ptolemaida		
1971–1974	AEK Athens	66	(0)
1974–1975	Panachaiki	30	(0)
1975–1980	Rodos		
Total		96	(0)
- * Club domestic league appearances and goals

Giorgos Tanidis (Greek: Γιώργος Τανίδης; 25 December 1946 – 3 June 2016) was a Greek professional footballer who played as a centre-back and a later manager.

== Club career ==
Tanidis was born and raised in Ptolemaida where at the age of 16 he started playing football at the local club, Aris Ptolemaida. With the club of Ptolemaida, the tough central defender distinguished himself in the championship of the second division. On 30 October 1970, Tanidis was transferred to AEK Athens for a fee of 120,000 drachmas, but since the transfer window was closed, his transfer became official in the summer of 1971. Thus, he spend the rest of the season training with the club, but without making any official appearance.

He made his debut with the yellow-blacks on 21 November 1971, in a 4–0 victory over Iraklis at home. He played for AEK for three seasons, while he also managed to make 2 appearances in the UEFA Cup. One on 27 September 1972 in the away 1–1 draw against Salgótarján and the other in the 3–0 against Liverpool at Anfield, on 24 October 1972.

On 16 August 1974, he was released from AEK and moved to Panachaiki. There he played for a season and afterwards he signed for Rodos. He played with the "deers" until 1980, when he ended his career as a football player, having managed to celebrate a promotion to the first division in 1978, where he played 2 more seasons.

== Managerial career ==
Tanidis stayed permanently with his family in Rhodes, where he coached several teams such as Rodos, Diagoras, Ialysos and Apollon Kalythies among others.

== Personal life ==
While he worked as a coach, Tanidis also worked at PPC and later as an entrepreneur. He was a member of the veterans' association of AEK and was often present at their events, with his last "football" presence being the friendly match in Karpathos with the local Posidonas Karpathos in the summer of 2006. On 15 January 2015, Tanidis came into the news again after an incident created at a pre-election event of Syriza in Rhodes, when he and his two sons protested strongly about the problems created by the Municipal Authority of Filadelfeia-Chalkidona in the construction of the new stadium of AEK. He died on 3 July 2016 after facing serious health issues, at the age of 69.

== Honours ==
Rodos

- Beta Ethniki: 1977–78
