= Rodolfo Vicente =

Argentine footballer

Personal information
- Full name: Raúl Rodolfo Vicente Gragovich
- Date of birth: 21 July 1946 (age 80)
- Positions: Right winger; right midfielder

Senior career*
Years	Team	Apps	(Gls)
1966–1968	Racing Club		
1968–1972	Atlanta	120	(8)
1972–1973	AEK Athens	17	(1)
1973–	Chacarita		
–1978	Ferro Carril Oeste		

International career
1967	Argentina	1	(1)
- * Club domestic league appearances and goals

Rodolfo Vicente (born 21 July 1946) is an Argentine former professional footballer. His nickname was "El Negro".

== Club career ==
Vicente started his football career at Racing Club, where he played until January 1968. There he won the Intercontinental Cup in 1967 against Celtic. Afterwards, he signed to the second division side, Atlanta, where having a good presence, he played for 4 seasons.

In the summer of 1972, the transfers of Latin American footballers to Greece, according to the current of the time, brought Vicente alongside Néstor Errea and Hugo Zeer to AEK Athens. He never adapted and didn't to help the team in an overall bad season, where they finished at the fifth place. On 13 September 1972 he scored his first goal at the club in a UEFA Cup game at home against Salgótarján. In the summer of 1973 he was released from AEK and returned to Argentina to play for Chacarita and Ferro Carril Oeste, before retiring in 1978.

== International career ==
Vicente competed once for Argentina shaping the final 5–0 win against Colombia, for the Pan American Games in 1967, where he won fifth place.

== Honours ==
Racing Club

- Intercontinental Cup: 1967
