= 1965–66 AEK Athens F.C. season =

AEK Athens
1965–66 season
- Chairman: Alexandros Makridis (until 5 December); Georgios Toubalidis
- Manager: Tryfon Tzanetis
- Stadium: AEK Stadium
- Alpha Ethniki: 3rd
- Greek Cup: Winners
- Top goalscorer: League: Mimis Papaioannou (23); All: Mimis Papaioannou (28)
- Highest home attendance: 30,912 vs Panathinaikos (3 April 1966)
- Lowest home attendance: 3,122 vs Iraklis (12 June 1966)
- Average home league attendance: 12,973
- Biggest win: AEK Athens 6–0 Niki Volos
- Biggest defeat: Olympiacos 4–0 AEK Athens
Home colours

The 1965–66 season was the 42nd season in the existence of AEK Athens F.C. and the seventh consecutive season in the top flight of Greek football. They competed in the Alpha Ethniki and the Greek Cup. The season began on 28 November 1965 and finished on 10 July 1966.

== Overview ==
The season was marked both for AEK Athens and Greek football in general, by both interesting and strange events. The strictness of the football authorities was the price paid by the yellow-blacks on the effort made at the beginning of the season with their official and former footballer, Kleanthis Maropoulos, in order to cooperate with the representatives of the regional clubs, creating a block of reaction to the dominance of Olympiacos and Panathinaikos in the decisions of the centers of authority. The "eternals", alarmed by the coalition of the rest that Maropoulos seemed to be succeeding even threatened to withdraw from the national championship, terrorizing the smaller clubs with the possibility of losing revenue. This resulted in delaying of the start of the championship until 28 November, when the first matchday was eventually set.

The start of the season for AEK was overshadowed by the conflict between the club's administration and Mimis Papaioannou. The officials of Real Madrid having being impressed with the performance and skills of the 23-year old Greek forward in a friendly 3–3 draw on 12 May 1965, resulted in the Spanish club making an offer for signing him during the summer. When they run into the administration's refusal, Papaioannou became bittered which led him to withdraw from the club's activities. Taking advantage of his vocal abilities, he joined the musical group that surrounded Stelios Kazantzidis and left for a tour in the Greek immigrants of Germany.

The abstention of Papaioannou put an obstacle on the plans of the newly-appointed manager, Tryfon Tzanetis who had taken care to strengthen the squad with prominent signings, such as the defender of Apollon Athens, Tasos Vasiliou, the forward of PAO Safrafoli, Kostas Nikolaidis and the main player in the midfield of Fostiras, Panagiotis Ventouris, while Nikos Stathopoulos, Giorgos Karafeskos and Michalis Simigdalas were promoted to the senior team. The absence of Papaioannou from the team's preparation and his looming absence from their competitive obligations forced Kostas Nestoridis, to take back his decision of leaving AEK and remain at the club. However, due to his advanced age, Nestoridis was no more sufficient to fill the gap of Papaioannou and AEK started their season in the championship with two defeats and one victory in their first three matches. In December, the differences between the administration and Papaioannou were settled and he returned to the team, shortly before the derby with Panathinaikos at Leoforos Alexandras Stadium. Despite the lack of training that caused him to suffer from cramps throughout the match, Papaioannou contributed to AEK's 2–3 victory by scoring one of the three goals while the other two scored by Nikolaidis. That match was the beginning of a 14-match undefeated streak, which brought the club on a distance of three points from the top. AEK were firmly in contention for the title, but the next two matches with the derbies at Karaiskakis Stadium against Olympiacos and in Nea Filadelfeia against Panathinaikos negated any hopes they may have had. On 27 March at Faliro, Olympiacos were sweeping, winning by 4–0 and in 3 April in the match against Panathinaikos, as the match was at 1–1 and while there had been previous violent incidents between the players in the first half, Panathinaikos scored at the 88th minute with Takis Loukanidis from an offside position. The referee awarded the goal and wild incidents occurred with the participation of supporters entering the pitch, which resulted in the match permanently stopped at the expense of AEK, who were zeroed and the game awarded to Panathinaikos. These incidents, led the officials of AEK not to participate in the next match in Serres against Panserraikos as a sign of protest. AEK were again zeroed and the threat of relegation after a possible third zeroing forced the club to return to the Championship, eventually finishing third.

AEK began their obligations in the Cup by eliminating Edessaikos with a 4–3 home win for the round of 32 and then Apollon Kalamarias with a 0–1 away win for the round of 16. In the quarter-final, they faced Ethnikos Piraeus at home and eliminated them with a 4–1 win. The draw for the semi-final brought AEK facing Kavala at home and Olympiacos facing Trikala at Piraeus. Kavala demanded that the match be played at their home ground citing a provision of the then regulations that stipulated that if one of the two teams came from Northern Greece in a pair of semi-finals, then the home team was automatically designated. AEK did not accept it, arguing that this regulation only concerned the clubs from Thessaloniki and not all clubs of Northern Greece in general. In order to reconcile things, the HFF, set the match at a neutral ground, the Kaftanzoglio Stadium, but Kavala refused to compete, insisting that the match should be played at their stadium. Thus, AEK advanced to the final as they were awarded the game without a match, where Olympiacos had already qualified after their 5–0 victory over Trikala. The definition by the HFF of setting the final on 10 July 1966, at Karaiskakis Stadium, brought the reactions of Olympiacos whose administration sent a letter to the Federation announcing their decision not to show up, protesting the advanced date in relation to the preparation of the club of Piraeus for the next season's European Cup. Thus, on 7 July the HFF, unable to convince Olympiacos for their participation in the final, declared AEK the winner with a 2–0 victory without a match.

In the midst of such situations, Kostas Nestoridis, one of the greatest Greek footballers in history and all-time legends of AEK, departed from the club after 11 years of presence.

== Management team ==
Position	Staff
Manager	(Greece) Tryfon Tzanetis
Assistant manager	(Greece) Georgios Magiras
Technical director	(Greece) Kleanthis Maropoulos
Academy director	(Greece) Georgios Daispangos
Academy manager	(Greece) Georgios Daispangos
Academy manager	(Greece) Kostas Poulis

== Players ==
=== Squad information ===
NOTE: The players are the ones that have been announced by the AEK Athens' press release. No edits should be made unless a player arrival or exit is announced. Updated 10 July 1966, 23:59 UTC+2.

Player	Nat.	Position(s)	Date of birth (Age)	Signed	Previous club	Transfer fee
Goalkeepers
Stelios Serafidis	(Greece)	GK	6 August 1935 (aged 30)	1953	(Greece) AEK Athens U20	—
Vangelis Petrakis	(Greece)	GK	7 September 1938 (aged 27)	1962	(Greece) Aris	₯500,000
Theodoros Maniateas	(Greece)	GK	19 March 1945 (aged 21)	1963	(Greece) Panthisiakos	Free
Defenders
Alekos Sofianidis	(Greece) (Turkey)	LB / LM / LW	3 August 1935 (aged 30)	1959	(Turkey) Beşiktaş	Free
Aleko Yordan	(Turkey) (Greece)	CB	10 January 1938 (aged 28)	1964	(Turkey) Beykoz	Free
Theofilos Vernezis	(Greece)	RB / CB / GK	1938 (aged 27–28)	1956	(Greece) AEK Athens U20	—
Tasos Vasiliou	(Greece)	CB	4 August 1938 (aged 27)	1965	(Greece) Apollon Athens	₯1,200,000
Giorgos Kefalidis	(Greece)	RB / CB	21 March 1941 (aged 25)	1964	(Greece) Pierikos	₯800,000
Fotis Balopoulos	(Greece)	CB / DM / CM / ST	17 December 1943 (aged 22)	1964	(Greece) Proodeftiki	₯450,000
Lakis Frogoudakis	(Greece)	LB / RB / CB / DM	1944 (aged 21–22)	1964	(Greece) AEK Athens U20	—
Midfielders
Giorgos Petridis	(Greece)	AM / SS / ST / LW	10 February 1938 (aged 28)	1957	(Greece) Pera Club	Free
Stelios Skevofilakas	(Greece)	LM / RM / AM / CM	6 January 1939 (aged 27)	1961	(Greece) Eleftheroupoli	Free
Fanis Tasinos	(Greece)	LM / CM / LB	28 October 1940 (aged 25)	1963	(Greece) Pagkorinthiakos	₯500,000
Michalis Simigdalas	(Greece)	CM / RM / LM / RB / LB	23 June 1944 (aged 22)	1963	(Greece) AEK Athens U20	—
Giorgos Karafeskos	(Greece)	CM / DM / RM / RW	8 December 1946 (aged 19)	1965	(Greece) AEK Athens U20	—
Forwards
Andreas Stamatiadis (Captain)	(Greece)	RW / LW / SS / AM	16 August 1935 (aged 30)	1952	(Greece) AEK Athens U20	—
Kostas Papageorgiou	(Greece)	ST / SS / RW / LW	1 January 1941 (aged 25)	1963	(Greece) Atromitos	₯200,000
Mimis Papaioannou	(Greece)	SS / ST / AM / RW	17 November 1942 (aged 23)	1962	(Greece) Veria	₯175,000
Spyros Pomonis	(Greece)	LW / LM	12 February 1944 (aged 22)	1960	(Greece) AEK Athens U20	—
Kostas Nikolaidis	(Greece)	RW / LW / SS / ST	10 September 1944 (aged 21)	1965	(Greece) PAO Safraboli	₯400,000
Left during season
Miltos Papapostolou	(Greece)	DM / CB	9 September 1935 (aged 30)	1956	(Greece) Egaleo	Free
Panagiotis Ventouris	(Greece)	LM / RM / LW / RW / ST / AM / SS	1 March 1943 (aged 23)	1965	(Greece) Fostiras	₯400,000
Kostas Nestoridis	(Greece)	ST / SS / LW / RW	15 March 1930 (aged 36)	1955	(Greece) Panionios	Free
Dimitris Antoniou	(Cyprus)	RW / ST	1939 (aged 26–27)	1965	(Cyprus) Apollon Limassol	Free
From Reserve Squad
Nikos Stathopoulos	(Greece)	LM / LB / CM	8 November 1943 (aged 22)	1956	(Greece) AEK Athens U20	—

== Transfers ==
=== In ===
Pos.	Player	From	Fee	Date	Source
DF	(Greece) Tasos Vasiliou	(Greece) Apollon Athens	₯1,200,000^{[a]}	31 July 1965	
MF	(Greece) Giorgos Karafeskos	(Greece) AEK Athens U20	Promotion	1 July 1965	
MF	(Greece) Panagiotis Ventouris	(Greece) Fostiras	₯400,000	1 July 1965	
FW	(Cyprus) Dimitris Antoniou	(Cyprus) Apollon Limassol	Free transfer	26 September 1965	
FW	(Greece) Kostas Nikolaidis	(Greece) PAO Safraboli	₯400,000^{[b]}	29 July 1965	

a. plus Panagiotis Stasinopoulos.

b. the fee was also for signing Angelos Platonidis.

=== Out ===
Pos.	Player	To	Fee	Date	Source
DF	(Greece) Panagiotis Stasinopoulos	(Greece) Apollon Athens	Free transfer	31 July 1965	
DF	(Greece) Manolis Kanellopoulos	(Greece) Egaleo	Contract termination	1 August 1965	
MF	(Greece) Miltos Papapostolou	Retired		1 May 1966	
MF	(Greece) Emilios Theofanidis	(Greece) PAOK	₯200,000	1 August 1965	
FW	(Cyprus) Dimitris Antoniou	(Cyprus) Apollon Limassol	Free transfer	30 April 1966	
FW	(Turkey) Lefter Küçükandonyadis	Retired		1 July 1965	

=== Loan out ===
Pos.	Player	To	Fee	Date	Until	Option to buy	Source
MF	(Greece) Panagiotis Ventouris	(South Africa) Hellenic	Free	29 December 1965	30 September 1966	✗	
FW	(Greece) Kostas Nestoridis	(Australia) South Melbourne Hellas	Free	14 March 1966	30 November 1966	✗	

=== Overall transfer activity ===
Expenditure: ▼ ₯2,000,000

Income: ▲ ₯200,000

Net Total: ▼ ₯1,800,000

== Pre-season and friendlies ==
21 August 1965 Friendly	AEK Athens	3–1	Athinaikos	Rizoupoli
17:00 EET (UTC+2)	Nestoridis 54' (pen.), 85'; Balopoulos 83'	Report	S. Konstantidis 10'	Stadium: Rizoupoli Stadium; Referee: Theodorou (Athens)

25 August 1965 Friendly	Nea Ionia XI	0–4	AEK Athens	Nea Ionia
		Report	Nestoridis 13', 18' (pen.); Balopoulos 63'; Ventouris 83' (pen.)	Stadium: Municipal Stadium of Nea Ionia; Referee: Giarenis

28 August 1965 Friendly	AEK Athens	0–1	Pakhtakor	Piraeus
17:00 EET (UTC+2)		Report	Abduraimov 54'	Stadium: Karaiskakis Stadium; Attendance: 16,059; Referee: Asikis

2 September 1965 Friendly	AEK Athens	2–0	Lokomotiv Sofia	Ampelokipoi
20:45 EET (UTC+2)	Nestoridis (penalty missed) 20', 20'; Nikolaidis 65'	Report		Stadium: Leoforos Alexandras Stadium; Attendance: 10,000; Referee: Lazaropoulos

8 September 1965 Friendly	PAO Kalogreza	1–2	AEK Athens	Nea Ionia
17:00 EET (UTC+2)	Giakoumis 1'	Report	Platonidis 33'; Nikolaidis 35'	Stadium: Municipal Stadium of Nea Ionia; Referee: Manolis Panakis (Athens)

10 September 1965 Friendly	Aris	0–0	AEK Athens	Thessaloniki
21:00 EET (UTC+2)		Report		Stadium: Kaftanzoglio Stadium; Attendance: 10,000; Referee: Karagounis (Thessaloniki)

12 September 1965 Friendly	Panserraikos	3–2	AEK Athens	Serres
	Tsakiris 40'; Rizos 65', 80'	Report	Papaioannou 55'; Ventouris 72'	Stadium: Serres Municipal Stadium; Referee: Apostolidis (Serres)
Note: At the 80th minute after the goal of Panserraikos, the match was suspended for 10 minutes, due to the protests of AEK.

19 September 1965 Friendly	Ethnikos Piraeus	0–2	AEK Athens	Piraeus
16:30 EET (UTC+2)		Report	Papaioannou 35'; Nikolaidis 56'	Stadium: Karaiskakis Stadium; Attendance: 10,000; Referee: Alexandros Monastiriotis (Piraeus)

22 September 1965 Friendly	PAO Safraboli	2–1	AEK Athens	Nea Ionia
16:30 EET (UTC+2)	Pavlidis 20'; Chiotis 35'	Report	Lavaridis 47'	Stadium: Municipal Stadium of Nea Ionia; Referee: Dimosthenis Stathatos (Athens)

25 September 1965 Friendly	Apollon Athens	0–1	AEK Athens	Rizoupoli
16:15 EET (UTC+2)		Report	Skevofilakas 5'	Stadium: Rizoupoli Stadium; Attendance: 3,196; Referee: Dimosthenis Stathatos (Athens)

26 September 1965 Friendly	Lamia	1–1	AEK Athens	Lamia
	Karanikolas 38'	Report	Nikolaidis 5'	Stadium: Lamia Municipal Stadium; Referee: Oikonomopoulos

29 September 1965 Friendly	AEK Athens	3–2	Espanyol	Piraeus
16:15 EET (UTC+2)	Papaioannou 15'; Nikolaidis 21'; Skevofilakas 26'	Report	Amas 31'; Boy 75'	Stadium: Karaiskakis Stadium; Attendance: 20,000; Referee: Manolis Panakis (Athens)

9 October 1965 Friendly	AEK Athens	3–1	Egaleo	Rizoupoli
16:00 EET (UTC+2)	Ventouris 15' (pen.); Kefalidis 28'; Petridis 33'	Report	Anastopoulos 55'	Stadium: Rizoupoli Stadium; Attendance: 1,200; Referee: Karpodinis (Athens)

10 October 1965 Friendly	Patras XI	1–1	AEK Athens	Patras
	Legatos 56'	Report	Papageorgiou 50'	Stadium: Panachaiki Stadium; Referee: Charalampos Tsagarousianos (Patras)

14 October 1965 Friendly	Nea Ionia XI	0–4	AEK Athens	Nea Ionia
15:45 EET (UTC+2)	Vafopoulos (penalty missed) 62'	Report	Petridis 10', 28'; Nestoridis 48'; Papageorgiou 80'	Stadium: Municipal Stadium of Nea Ionia; Referee: Panagiotis Tsolakidis (Thessaloniki)

16 October 1965 Friendly	AEK Athens	1–0	Panionios	Rizoupoli
15:45 EET (UTC+2)	Nestoridis 75'	Report		Stadium: Rizoupoli Stadium; Attendance: 2,012; Referee: Christos Michas (Athens)

24 October 1965 Friendly	Olympiakos Chalkida	1–2	AEK Athens	Chalcis
15:30 EET (UTC+2)	Bratsiotis 37'; Papazoglou (penalty missed) 85'	Report	Nikolaidis 37'; Papageorgiou 73'	Stadium: Municipal Stadium of Chalkis; Attendance: 4,000; Referee: Anamakis

31 October 1965 Friendly	AEK Athens	5–0	Apollon Limassol	Nea Filadelfeia
15:30 EET (UTC+2)	Antoniou 10'; Nikolaidis 24'; Ventouris 36'; Karafeskos 70'; Pomonis 90'	Report		Stadium: AEK Stadium; Attendance: 5,000; Referee: Katsaris
Note: The referee and his assistants were brought to the pitch at the last moment from the stands.

3 November 1965 Friendly	AEK Athens	2–1	Internazionale	Nea Filadelfeia
15:30 EET (UTC+2)	Stamatiadis 71'; Nikolaidis 73'	Report	Peiró 11'	Stadium: AEK Stadium; Attendance: 25,000; Referee: Leonidas Vamvakopoulos (Athens)

7 November 1965 Friendly	AEK Athens	3–2	Panegialios	Nea Filadelfeia
15:30 EET (UTC+2)	Nestoridis 10'; Nikolaidis 20'; Stamatiadis 35'	Report	Kritikopoulos 25'; Stergiou 42'	Stadium: AEK Stadium; Attendance: 10,000; Referee: Dimitris Protonotarios (Athens)

14 November 1965 Friendly	AEK Athens	5–0	Proodeftiki	Nea Filadelfeia
15:15 EET (UTC+2)	Nestoridis 15'; Nikolaidis 65', 80'; Karafeskos 66', 86'	Report		Stadium: AEK Stadium; Attendance: 5,618; Referee: Ballas

18 November 1965 Friendly	AEK Athens	1–1	Greece military	Nea Filadelfeia
15:00 EET (UTC+2)	Papageorgiou 10'	Report	Pomonis 52'	Stadium: AEK Stadium; Referee: Manolis Platopoulos (Athens)
Note: Balopoulos and Pomonis played with Greece military against AEK, since they were serving in the Greek Army at the time.

21 November 1965 Friendly	AEK Athens	2–0	Iraklis	Nea Filadelfeia
15:15 EET (UTC+2)	Kefalidis 23'; Ventouris 30'	Report		Stadium: AEK Stadium; Attendance: 6,532; Referee: Menandros

9 December 1965 Friendly	AEK Athens	6–2	Marko	Nea Filadelfeia
	Nestoridis; Karafeskos; Papageorgiou; Antoniou	Report	Goal	Stadium: AEK Stadium

16 December 1965 Friendly	AEK Athens	12–0	Eleftheroupoli	Nea Filadelfeia
	Papageorgiou; Nikolaidis; Skevofilakas; Stamatiadis; Pomonis	Report		Stadium: AEK Stadium

22 December 1965 Friendly	AEK Athens	9–3	Athinaikos	Nea Filadelfeia
15:00 EET (UTC+2)	Petridis 3', 13', 22'; Ventouris 15', 29', 63'; Antoniou 35'; Simigdalas 43'; Papageorgiou 69'	Report	Stefanakis 8'; Aronis 46', 71'	Stadium: AEK Stadium; Attendance: 1,000; Referee: (Athens)

10 February 1966 Friendly	AEK Athens	14–0	Panionikos	Nea Filadelfeia
15:30 EET (UTC+2)	Papageorgiou; Stamatiadis; Karafeskos; Papaioannou; Simigdalas; Skevofilakas; Nikolaidis; Pomonis	Report		Stadium: AEK Stadium
Note: Petrakis compteted with both clubs throughout the second half.

16 February 1966 Friendly	AEK Athens	7–0	Marko	Nea Filadelfeia
15:30 EET (UTC+2)	Papageorgiou 15'; Karafeskos 35'; Papaioannou 40', 50'; Stamatiadis 58', 60', 70'	Report		Stadium: AEK Stadium; Referee: Alexopoulos (Athens)

17 February 1966 Friendly	AEK Athens	6–0	Agioi Anargyroi	Nea Filadelfeia
15:30 EET (UTC+2)	Magiras; Simigdalas; Tasinos; Kyrmizas	Report		Stadium: AEK Stadium; Referee: Georgios Magiras

24 February 1966 Friendly	AEK Athens	12–0	Spyros Louis	Nea Filadelfeia
15:30 EET (UTC+2)	Papageorgiou; Papaioannou; Karafeskos; Pomonis; Simigdalas; Nikolaidis; Stamatiadis	Report		Stadium: AEK Stadium; Referee: Georgios Magiras

9 March 1966 Friendly	AEK Athens	2–1	Aarhus	Nea Filadelfeia
15:30 EET (UTC+2)	Yordan 3'; Nikolaidis 68'	Report	Beck 13'	Stadium: AEK Stadium; Attendance: 3,000; Referee: Dimosthenis Stathatos (Athens)

24 March 1966 Friendly	AEK Athens	5–0	P.O. Patisia	Nea Filadelfeia
16:00 EET (UTC+2)	Nikolaidis; Skevofilakas; Papaioannou	Report		Stadium: AEK Stadium; Referee: Georgios Magiras

12 April 1966 Friendly	AEK Athens	3–0	Panegialios	Nea Filadelfeia
16:30 EET (UTC+2)	Petridis 4', 16'; Papageorgiou 44'	Report		Stadium: AEK Stadium; Attendance: 9,958; Referee: Tsatsoglou

15 April 1966 Friendly	AEK Athens	5–1	Asteras Zografou	Nea Filadelfeia
16:30 EET (UTC+2)	Nikolaidis 3', 15', 30'; Karafeskos 62'; Kyrmizas 76'	Report	Giakoumakis 40' (pen.)	Stadium: AEK Stadium; Referee: Mantas

21 April 1966 Friendly	AEK Athens	4–0	A.O. Petralona	Nea Filadelfeia
16:30 EET (UTC+2)	Papaioannou 4'; Papageorgiou 15'; Balopoulos 22'; Karafeskos 85' (pen.)	Report		Stadium: AEK Stadium; Attendance: 1,500; Referee: Moschatos

24 April 1966 Friendly	AEK Athens	12–0	Levadiakos	Nea Filadelfeia
16:30 EET (UTC+2)	Simigdalas 9'; Stamatiadis 19'; Papaioannou 22', 57', 59', 77'; Nikolaidis 43', 82', 84'; Tasinos 69'; Karafeskos 80', 88'	Report		Stadium: AEK Stadium; Referee: Manolis Platopoulos (Athens)

4 May 1966 Friendly	AEK Athens	8–0	Atromitos	Nea Filadelfeia
16:45 EET (UTC+2)	Papaioannou 12', 16', 62', 76'; Simigdalas 14', 28'; Karafeskos 30'; Tasinos 73'	Report		Stadium: AEK Stadium; Attendance: 774; Referee: Asikis

18 May 1966 Friendly	AEK Athens	1–0	Everton	Nea Filadelfeia
16:30 EET (UTC+2)	Papageorgiou 45'	Report		Stadium: AEK Stadium; Attendance: 14,126; Referee: Dimosthenis Stathatos (Athens)

25 May 1966 Friendly	AEK Athens	10–1	Attikos	Nea Filadelfeia
17:15 EET (UTC+2)	Papageorgiou 10', 28', 35'; Simigdalas 25', 73'; Stathopoulos 30', 65'; Pomonis 40', 85'; Vasiliou 55'	Report	Karathanasis 41'; Germanakos (penalty missed) 90'	Stadium: AEK Stadium; Referee: Vamvakinos
Note: At the 68th minute AEK were left with 10 men, due to the injury of Petridis.

15 June 1966 Friendly	AEK Athens	2–0	Stirling Albion	Nea Filadelfeia
17:30 EET (UTC+2)	Papaioannou 30'; Stathopoulos 41'	Report		Stadium: AEK Stadium; Attendance: 2,873; Referee: Thodoros Giavropoulos (Piraeus)

22 June 1966 Friendly	AEK Athens	6–0	Afovos	Nea Filadelfeia
17:30 EET (UTC+2)	Stamatiadis 18'; Nikolaidis 35', 71', 85'; Papaioannou 45' (pen.); Simigdalas 70'	Report		Stadium: AEK Stadium; Referee: Katsaris

== Competitions ==
=== Overall record ===
Competition	First match	Last match	Starting round	Final position	Record							
Competition	First match	Last match	Starting round	Final position	Pld	W	D	L	GF	GA	GD	Win %
Alpha Ethniki	28 November 1965	19 June 1966	Matchday 1	3rd	30	19	5	6	58	26	+32	63.33
Greek Cup	6 January 1966	10 July 1966	Round of 32	Winners	5	5	0	0	13	4	+9	100.00
Total					35	24	5	6	71	30	+41	68.57

Last updated: 10 July 1966
Source: Competitions

=== Alpha Ethniki ===
==== League table ====
Pos	Team	Pld	W	D	L	GF	GA	GD	Pts	Qualification or relegation
1	Olympiacos (C)	30	23	4	3	67	18	+49	80	Qualification for European Cup first round
2	Panathinaikos	30	23	3	4	85	24	+61	79	
3	AEK Athens (Note: AEK Athens were deducted 2 points.)	30	19	5	6	58	26	+32	71	Qualification for Cup Winners' Cup first round
4	Panionios (Note: Panionios were deducted 1 point.)	30	12	7	11	38	37	+1	60	
5	Aris	30	11	8	11	42	42	0	60	Invitation for Inter-Cities Fairs Cup first round

Source: RSSSF
Rules for classification: 1st points; 2nd decision match; 3rd head-to-head goal difference.
(C) Champions

==== Results summary ====
Overall								Home						Away					
Pld	W	D	L	GF	GA	GD	Pts	W	D	L	GF	GA	GD	W	D	L	GF	GA	GD
30	19	5	6	58	26	+32	71	12	1	2	39	11	+28	7	4	4	19	15	+4

Source: Competitive matches

==== Results by Matchday ====
Round	1	2	3	4	5	6	7	8	9	10	11	12	13	14	15	16	17	18	19	20	21	22	23	24	25	26	27	28	29	30
Ground	A	A	H	A	H	A	H	A	H	A	A	A	H	A	H	H	H	A	Η	A	H	A	H	A	H	H	H	A	H	A
Result	L	W	L	W	W	D	D	W	W	W	D	W	W	D	W	W	W	L	L	L	W	W	W	D	W	W	W	L	W	W
Position	9	5	11	8	6	8	5	5	4	4	4	3	3	3	3	3	3	3	3	3	3	3	3	3	3	3	3	3	3	3

Source: Competitive matches
A = Away; H = Home; W = Win; D = Draw; L = Loss; P = Postponed

==== Matches ====
28 November 1965 1	Aris	2–1	AEK Athens	Thessaloniki
15:00 EET (UTC+2)	Alexiadis 5', 61'		Stamatiadis 50'	Stadium: Aris Stadium; Attendance: 3,838; Referee: Rudibert Jacobi (West Germany)

4 December 1965 2	Proodeftiki	1–3	AEK Athens	Piraeus
15:00 EET (UTC+2)	Kallis 56'		Nestoridis 32'; Nikolaidis 57'; Stamatiadis 70'	Stadium: Karaiskakis Stadium; Attendance: 7,082; Referee: Periklis Poulias (Athens)

12 December 1965 3	AEK Athens	0–2	Olympiacos	Nea Filadelfeia
15:00 EET (UTC+2)			P. Vasiliou 63'; Aganian 80'	Stadium: AEK Stadium; Attendance: 30,000; Referee: Carl Hansen (Denmark)

19 December 1965 4	Panathinaikos	2–3	AEK Athens	Ampelokipoi
15:00 EET (UTC+2)	Loukanidis 11' (pen.); Papoutsakis 40'		Nikolaidis 5', 66'; Papaioannou 15'	Stadium: Leoforos Alexandras Stadium; Attendance: 24,535; Referee: Helmut Frizt (West Germany)

26 December 1965 5	AEK Athens	2–1	Panserraikos	Nea Filadelfeia
15:00 EET (UTC+2)	Papaioannou 52'; Yordan 84'		Bitzidis 65'	Stadium: AEK Stadium; Attendance: 14,165; Referee: Dimosthenis Stathatos (Athens)

2 January 1966 6	PAOK	1–1	AEK Athens	Thessaloniki
15:00 EET (UTC+2)	Charalampidis 4'		Papaioannou 87'	Stadium: Toumba Stadium; Attendance: 13,225; Referee: Manolis Panakis (Athens)

9 January 1966 7	AEK Athens	0–0	Apollon Athens	Nea Filadelfeia
15:00 EET (UTC+2)				Stadium: AEK Stadium; Attendance: 16,233; Referee: Petros Tzouvaras (Thessaly)

16 January 1966 8	Panionios	0–1	AEK Athens	Nea Smyrni
15:00 EET (UTC+2)			Papageorgiou 52'	Stadium: Nea Smyrni Stadium; Attendance: 11,466; Referee: Tittl Josef (Austria)

23 January 1966 9	AEK Athens	3–1	Trikala	Nea Filadelfeia
15:00 EET (UTC+2)	Nikolaidis 6'; Skevofilakas 34' (pen.); Papaioannou 76'		Poulianas 23'	Stadium: AEK Stadium; Attendance: 11,823; Referee: Lefas (Piraeus)

30 January 1966 10	Egaleo	0–1	AEK Athens	Ampelokipoi
15:15 EET (UTC+2)			Papaioannou (penalty missed) 6'; Papageorgiou 90'	Stadium: Leoforos Alexandras Stadium; Attendance: 11,100; Referee: Timoleon Latsios (Larissa)

6 February 1966 11	Ethnikos Piraeus	0–0	AEK Athens	Piraeus
15:15 EET (UTC+2)				Stadium: Karaiskakis Stadium; Attendance: 23,662; Referee: Subhy Nosseir (Egypt)

13 February 1966 12	Panegialios	0–2	AEK Athens	Aigio
15:30 EET (UTC+2)			Papaioannou 38'; Karafeskos 77'	Stadium: Aigio National Stadium; Attendance: 4,685; Referee: Alfred Haberfellner (Austria)

20 February 1966 13	AEK Athens	3–0	Pierikos	Nea Filadelfeia
15:45 EET (UTC+2)	Nikolaidis 4'; Stamatiadis 9'; Papaioannou 25'			Stadium: AEK Stadium; Attendance: 11,488; Referee: Reuben Prizner (Israel)

27 February 1966 14	Iraklis	0–0	AEK Athens	Thessaloniki
15:30 EET (UTC+2)				Stadium: Kaftanzoglio Stadium; Attendance: 9,909; Referee: Alfred Haberfellner (Austria)

6 March 1966 15	AEK Athens	6–0	Niki Volos	Nea Filadelfeia
15:30 EET (UTC+2)	Nikolaidis 4', 33', 53'; Papaioannou 50', 58'; Karafeskos 69'			Stadium: AEK Stadium; Attendance: 6,492; Referee: Pagourtzis (Phthiotis)

13 March 1966 16	AEK Athens	2–0	Aris	Nea Filadelfeia
16:00 EET (UTC+2)	Papageorgiou 13'; Karafeskos 63'			Stadium: AEK Stadium; Attendance: 19,870; Referee: Franz Mayer (Austria)

20 March 1966 17	AEK Athens	2–1	Proodeftiki	Nea Filadelfeia
15:45 EET (UTC+2)	Papageorgiou 33'; Papaioannou 78'		Nikolakakos 82'	Stadium: AEK Stadium; Attendance: 14,467; Referee: Timoleon Latsios (Larissa)

27 March 1966 18	Olympiacos	4–0	AEK Athens	Piraeus
16:00 EET (UTC+2)	Neofotistos 30'; Petrakis 43' (o.g.); Sideris 58'; Papazoglou 65'			Stadium: Karaiskakis Stadium; Attendance: 40,600; Referee: Louis Raynard (France)

3 April 1966 19	AEK Athens	0–2 (Awarded)	Panathinaikos	Nea Filadelfeia
16:00 EET (UTC+2)	Skevofilakas (penalty missed) 21'; Papaioannou 50'		Sakellaridis 8'; Loukanidis 88'	Stadium: AEK Stadium; Attendance: 30,912; Referee: Manuel Lousada (Portugal)
Note: AEK played with 10 players from the 37th minute, due to the injury of Kefalidis. The match was interrupted at the 37th minute due to violent incidents between the footballers of the two clubs. The match was abandoned at the 88th minute with score at 1–2 after the intense protests the players of AEK to the referee, claiming that the goal of Loukanidis was from an offside position. The incidents between the players led to a fan invasion. The kick off never took place and the referee found out that the time of the protests was two minutes and ended the match in the locker rooms. Three days later, ESAPEK decided that the match did not end, but was abandoned and AEK Athens were zeroed. Thus, the match was awarded by 0–2 to Panathinaikos.

11 April 1966 20	Panserraikos	2–0 (Awarded)	AEK Athens	Serres
				Stadium: Serres Municipal Stadium
Note: AEK didn't show up for the match as a protest against the HFF and the bad refereeing against them in the previous matchday, against Panathinaikos. Thus, they were zeroed for a second match in a row, which was awarded to Panseraikos

17 April 1966 21	AEK Athens	5–1	PAOK	Nea Filadelfeia
16:30 EET (UTC+2)	Papaioannou 1', 34', 87' (pen.); Papageorgiou 6'; Petridis 83'		Charalampidis 17'	Stadium: AEK Stadium; Attendance: 9,914; Referee: Manuel Gómez Arribas (Spain)

27 April 1966 22	Apollon Athens	0–2	AEK Athens	Ampelokipoi
16:30 EET (UTC+2)			Nikolaidis 32'; Papaioannou 70'	Stadium: Leoforos Alexandras Stadium; Attendance: 15,000; Referee: Dimitris Protonotarios (Athens)
Note: The match was originally scheduled to be held on 24 April, but the police department of Perissos did not give permission for the match to be conducted at Rizoupoli Stadium.

1 May 1966 23	AEK Athens	5–1	Panionios	Nea Filadelfeia
16:30 EET (UTC+2)	Stathopoulos 11'; Papaioannou 40', 44', 65'; Stamatiadis 76'		Dedes 50'	Stadium: AEK Stadium; Attendance: 3,890; Referee: Lefas (Piraeus)

8 May 1966 24	Trikala	2–2	AEK Athens	Trikala
17:00 EET (UTC+2)	Zachos (penalty missed) 5'; Rachavelias 22'; Charitidis 32'		Simigdalas 2'; Papaioannou 54'	Stadium: Trikala Municipal Stadium; Attendance: 6,675; Referee: Kostas Xanthos (Dodecanese)

15 May 1966 25	AEK Athens	4–1	Egaleo	Nea Filadelfeia
17:00 EET (UTC+2)	Papaioannou 15', 78', 82'; Stamatiadis 23'		Markopoulos 16'	Stadium: AEK Stadium; Attendance: 7,424; Referee: Geroukalis (Athens)

22 May 1966 26	AEK Athens	2–1	Ethnikos Piraeus	Nea Filadelfeia
17:00 EET (UTC+2)	Yordan 7'; Papageorgiou 78'		Tsokataridis 42'	Stadium: AEK Stadium; Attendance: 10,251; Referee: Christos Pagiaslis (Piraeus)

29 May 1966 27	AEK Athens	2–0	Panegialios	Nea Filadelfeia
17:00 EET (UTC+2)	Pomonis 33'; Papaioannou 85'			Stadium: Nikos Goumas Stadium; Attendance: 4,200; Referee: Periklis Poulias (Athens)

5 June 1966 28	Pierikos	1–0	AEK Athens	Katerini
17:00 EET (UTC+2)	Felekidis 3'			Stadium: Katerini Stadium; Attendance: 2,111; Referee: Vasile Dumitrescu (Romania)

12 June 1966 29	AEK Athens	3–0	Iraklis	Nea Filadelfeia
17:30 EET (UTC+2)	Papageorgiou 24'; Papaioannou 50'; Nikolaidis 75'			Stadium: AEK Stadium; Attendance: 3,122; Referee: Epameinontas Chatzinikolaou (Athens)

19 June 1966 30	Niki Volos	0–3	AEK Athens	Volos
17:30 EET (UTC+2)			Papaioannou 12'; Nikolaidis 26'; Stamatiadis 66'	Stadium: Niki Volos Stadium; Attendance: 608; Referee: Polychronis

=== Greek Cup ===
AEK entered the Greek Cup at the round of 32.

==== Matches ====
6 January 1966 Round of 32	AEK Athens	4–3	Edessaikos	Nea Filadelfeia
14:30 EET (UTC+2)	Papaioannou 11', 25', 62' (pen.); Nikolaidis 40'		Krontselis 36', 60'; Vasdaris 46'	Stadium: AEK Stadium; Referee: Giannis Adamakis (Chalkida)

11 May 1966 Round of 16	Apollon Kalamarias	0–1	AEK Athens	Thessaloniki
16:30 EET (UTC+2)			Papaioannou 43'	Stadium: Toumba Stadium; Attendance: 3,032; Referee: Dimosthenis Stathatos (Athens)

26 June 1966 Quarter-finals	AEK Athens	4–1	Ethnikos Piraeus	Nea Filadelfeia
17:00 EET (UTC+2)	Karafeskos 13'; Papaioannou 44'; Nikolaidis 48', 72'		Leventakos 5'	Stadium: AEK Stadium; Attendance: 15,000; Referee: Giuliano Acernese (Italy)

7 July 1966 Semi-finals	AEK Athens	2–0 (Awarded)	Kavala	Thessaloniki
				Stadium: Kaftanzoglio Stadium
Note: Kavala did not show up, claiming that the match should be played in their home ground. According to relative regulation, the HFF, even though they set the match at Kaftanzoglio Stadium in Thessaloniki, did not accept Kavala's claim and awarded the game to AEK Athens by 2–0 without a match.

10 July 1966 Final	Olympiacos	0–2 (Awarded)	AEK Athens	Piraeus
		Report		Stadium: Karaiskakis Stadium
Note: Since the HFF was late to determine a date for the final, Olympiacos were unable to show up, as they had to prepare for the next season's European Cup. Thus, the final was scratched and AEK Athens were awarded the cup.

== Statistics ==
=== Squad statistics ===
As of 10 July 1966

No.	Pos	Player	Alpha Ethniki		Greek Cup		Total	
No.	Pos	Player	Apps	Goals	Apps	Goals	Apps	Goals
Goalkeepers
—	GK	(Kingdom of Greece) Stelios Serafidis	11	0	3	0	14	0
—	GK	(Kingdom of Greece) Vangelis Petrakis	17	0	0	0	17	0
—	GK	(Kingdom of Greece) Theodoros Maniateas	1	0	0	0	1	0
Defenders
—	DF	(Kingdom of Greece) Alekos Sofianidis	29	0	3	0	32	0
—	DF	(Turkey) Aleko Yordan	26	2	2	0	28	2
—	DF	(Kingdom of Greece) Theofilos Vernezis	0	0	0	0	0	0
—	DF	(Kingdom of Greece) Tasos Vasiliou	29	0	3	0	32	0
—	DF	(Kingdom of Greece) Giorgos Kefalidis	18	0	1	0	19	0
—	DF	(Kingdom of Greece) Fotis Balopoulos	13	0	2	0	15	0
—	DF	(Kingdom of Greece) Lakis Frogoudakis	2	0	1	0	3	0
Midfielders
—	MF	(Kingdom of Greece) Giorgos Petridis	8	1	1	0	9	1
—	MF	(Kingdom of Greece) Stelios Skevofilakas	27	1	2	0	29	1
—	MF	(Kingdom of Greece) Fanis Tasinos	2	0	1	0	3	0
—	MF	(Kingdom of Greece) Michalis Simigdalas	4	1	0	0	4	1
—	MF	(Kingdom of Greece) Giorgos Karafeskos	22	3	3	1	25	4
Forwards
—	FW	(Kingdom of Greece) Andreas Stamatiadis	28	6	3	0	31	6
—	FW	(Kingdom of Greece) Kostas Papageorgiou	15	7	0	0	15	7
—	FW	(Kingdom of Greece) Mimis Papaioannou	25	23	3	5	28	28
—	FW	(Kingdom of Greece) Spyros Pomonis	10	1	0	0	10	1
—	FW	(Kingdom of Greece) Kostas Nikolaidis	21	11	3	3	24	14
Left during season
—	MF	(Kingdom of Greece) Miltos Papapostolou	0	0	0	0	0	0
—	MF	(Kingdom of Greece) Panagiotis Ventouris	3	0	0	0	3	0
—	FW	(Kingdom of Greece) Kostas Nestoridis	3	1	0	0	3	1
—	FW	(Kingdom of Greece) Dimitris Antoniou	0	0	0	0	0	0
From Reserve Squad
—	MF	(Kingdom of Greece) Nikos Stathopoulos	5	1	2	0	7	1

=== Goalscorers ===
As of 10 July 1966
The list is sorted by competition order when total goals are equal, then by position and then alphabetically by surname.

Rank	Pos.	Player	Alpha Ethniki	Greek Cup	Total
1	FW	(Greece) Mimis Papaioannou	23	5	28
2	FW	(Greece) Kostas Nikolaidis	11	3	14
3	FW	(Greece) Kostas Papageorgiou	7	0	7
4	FW	(Greece) Andreas Stamatiadis	6	0	6
5	MF	(Greece) Giorgos Karafeskos	3	1	4
6	DF	(Turkey) Aleko Yordan	2	0	2
7	MF	(Greece) Michalis Simigdalas	1	0	1
7	MF	(Greece) Stelios Skevofilakas	1	0	1
7	MF	(Greece) Nikos Stathopoulos	1	0	1
7	MF	(Greece) Giorgos Petridis	1	0	1
7	FW	(Greece) Spyros Pomonis	1	0	1
7	FW	(Greece) Kostas Nestoridis	1	0	1
Own goals			0	0	0
Totals			58	9	67

=== Hat-tricks ===
Numbers in superscript represent the goals that the player scored.

Player	Against	Result	Date	Competition	Source
(Greece) Mimis Papaioannou	(Greece) Edessaikos	4–3 (H)	6 January 1966	Greek Cup	
(Greece) Kostas Nikolaidis	(Greece) Niki Volos	6–0 (H)	6 March 1966	Alpha Ethniki	
(Greece) Mimis Papaioannou	(Greece) PAOK	5–1 (H)	17 April 1966	Alpha Ethniki	
(Greece) Mimis Papaioannou	(Greece) Panionios	5–1 (H)	1 May 1966	Alpha Ethniki	
(Greece) Mimis Papaioannou	(Greece) Egaleo	4–1 (H)	15 May 1966	Alpha Ethniki	

=== Clean sheets ===
As of 10 July 1966
The list is sorted by competition order when total clean sheets are equal and then alphabetically by surname. Clean sheets in games where both goalkeepers participated are awarded to the goalkeeper who started the game. Goalkeepers with no appearances are not included.

Rank	Player	Alpha Ethniki	Greek Cup	Total
1	(Greece) Vangelis Petrakis	8	0	8
2	(Greece) Stelios Serafidis	4	1	5
3	(Greece) Theodoros Maniateas	1	0	1
Totals		13	1	14

=== Disciplinary record ===
As of 10 July 1966

N	P	Nat.	Name	Alpha Ethniki			Greek Cup			Total			Notes
N	P	Nat.	Name	Yellow card	Second yellow card	Red card	Yellow card	Second yellow card	Red card	Yellow card	Second yellow card	Red card	Notes
Goalkeepers
—	GK	(Kingdom of Greece)	Stelios Serafidis										
—	GK	(Kingdom of Greece)	Vangelis Petrakis										
—	GK	(Kingdom of Greece)	Theodoros Maniateas										
Defenders
—	DF	(Kingdom of Greece)	Alekos Sofianidis										
—	DF	(Turkey)	Aleko Yordan										
—	DF	(Kingdom of Greece)	Theofilos Vernezis										
—	DF	(Kingdom of Greece)	Tasos Vasiliou										
—	DF	(Kingdom of Greece)	Giorgos Kefalidis										
—	DF	(Kingdom of Greece)	Fotis Balopoulos										
—	DF	(Kingdom of Greece)	Lakis Frogoudakis										
Midfielders
—	MF	(Kingdom of Greece)	Giorgos Petridis										
—	MF	(Kingdom of Greece)	Stelios Skevofilakas										
—	MF	(Kingdom of Greece)	Fanis Tasinos										
—	MF	(Kingdom of Greece)	Michalis Simigdalas										
—	MF	(Kingdom of Greece)	Giorgos Karafeskos										
Forwards
—	FW	(Kingdom of Greece)	Andreas Stamatiadis										
—	FW	(Kingdom of Greece)	Kostas Papageorgiou										
—	FW	(Kingdom of Greece)	Mimis Papaioannou										
—	FW	(Kingdom of Greece)	Spyros Pomonis										
—	FW	(Kingdom of Greece)	Kostas Nikolaidis										
Left during season
—	MF	(Kingdom of Greece)	Miltos Papapostolou										
—	MF	(Kingdom of Greece)	Panagiotis Ventouris										
—	FW	(Kingdom of Greece)	Kostas Nestoridis										
—	FW	(Kingdom of Greece)	Dimitris Antoniou										
From Reserve Squad
—	MF	(Kingdom of Greece)	Nikos Stathopoulos										

=== Starting 11 ===
This section presents the most frequently used formation along with the players with the most starts across all competitions.

N.	Formation	Matchday(s)
35	4–2–4	1–30

Nat.	Player	Pos.
(Greece)	Vangelis Petrakis	GK
(Greece)	Tasos Vasiliou	RCB
(Turkey)	Aleko Yordan	LCB
(Greece)	Giorgos Kefalidis	RB
(Greece)	Alekos Sofianidis	LB
(Greece)	Giorgos Karafeskos	RCM
(Greece)	Stelios Skevofilakas	LCM
(Greece)	Andreas Stamatiadis (C)	RW
(Greece)	Kostas Nikolaidis	LW
(Greece)	Mimis Papaioannou	RCF
(Greece)	Kostas Papageorgiou	LCF

Last updated: 1966-07-10

== Awards ==
Player	Pos.	Award	Source
(Greece) Mimis Papaioannou	FW	Alpha Ethniki Top Scorer	
