= 1964–65 AEK Athens F.C. season =

AEK Athens
1964–65 season
- Chairman: Alexandros Makridis
- Manager: Mirko Kokotović
- Stadium: AEK Stadium
- Alpha Ethniki: 2nd
- Greek Cup: Quarter-finals
- European Cup Winners' Cup: First round
- Top goalscorer: League: Kostas Nestoridis (17); All: Kostas Papageorgiou; Kostas Nestoridis (20 each)
- Highest home attendance: 34,054 vs Panathinaikos (3 January 1965)
- Lowest home attendance: 3,425 vs Ethnikos Piraeus (21 March 1965)
- Average home league attendance: 15,276
- Biggest win: Apollon Athens 1–7 AEK Athens
- Biggest defeat: Dinamo Zagreb 3–0 AEK Athens
Home colours

The 1964–65 season was the 41st season in the existence of AEK Athens F.C. and the sixth consecutive season in the top flight of Greek football. They competed in the Alpha Ethniki, the Greek Cup and the European Cup Winners' Cup. The season began on 9 September 1964 and finished on 2 July 1965.

== Overview ==
In the summer of 1964, the administration of AEK Athens, having the goal of winning the league, appointed Mirko Kokotović, the manager who had won the Turkish championship with Fenerbahçe and reached the quarter-finals of the European Cup Winners' Cup. Furthermore, with the former footballer, Kleanthis Maropoulos assuming the position of the technical director, AEK proceeded with signings, such as Fotis Balopoulos from Proodeftiki, Giorgos Kefalidis from Pierikos and the Turkish international Lefter Küçükandonyadis from Fenerbahçe, even though he was at an advanced age.

AEK played for the first time in their history in the final stage of UEFA competitions and specifically the Cup Winners' Cup. They were drawn Dinamo Zagreb for the first round against. Over 30,000 supporters rushed to AEK Stadium on 9 September, to see the top scorer of the World Cup at Chile, Dražan Jerković and the rest of the famous Yugoslavs in action. However, the spectacle was not what was expected, since both clubs started scared and harsh. The Yugoslavs were extremely unsportsmanlike in their game, as they wanted a draw and to kill the time off. AEK pressed unorthodoxly, but were unable to create many dangerous chances. The referee refused a penalty for the Greek club and their players were overcome by frustration, while the same spectacle continued in the second half. In the hourmark, the Yugoslavs had gone too far with their unsportsmanlike game, which resulted in the dismissal of Zdenko Kobeščak with a straight red after a harsh tackle on Mimis Papaioannou. A fight between the players ensued, while the enraged supporters threw objects on the pitch and the match was almost stopped at the expense of AEK. However, that interruption favored AEK who scored twice within 5 minutes with Papaioannou and Nestoridis and the match ended with AEK gaining an important advantage, while also achieving their first victory in the UEFA competitions. The rematch at Stadion Maksimir the Yugoslavs showed unprecedented fanaticism, playing tougher than the first leg. The referee decided to take cards out of his pocket only when things got dangerously out of hand in the second half. Dynamo played more offensively, but the performance of Stelios Serafidis and Aleko Yordan limited the Yugoslavs' striker, Dražan Jerković. However, the half ended in the worst possible way for AEK, who conceded a goal at the stoppage time. With the match bordering on unsportsmanlike, Dynamo quickly equalized the score of the first match and 7 minutes later they made it 3–0. From that point on, the players of AEK, clearly irritated and overwhelmed by the harsh play of their opponents, started to play unsportsmanlike, while the atmosphere was particularly tense. This resulted in Spyros Pomonis being sent off at the 76th minute and Slaven Zambata at the 85th minute. A new series of incidents followed, which culminated in the end, when part of the supporters of Dynamo entered the pitch and moved against the Greek team. Eventually the worst were avoided, but the final result remained, which left AEK out of the tournament.

Their beginning in the championship was not as expected, since in their first three matches, AEK had two draws and an away win with an emphatic 7–1 against Apollon Athens. Afterwards, their performance was stabilized at a satisfactory level for the rest of the first round of the championship. On the 12th matchday, they faced Panathinaikos at home and after their 2–2 draw in a match that, due to the large crowd at the stadium and its pressure, the billboards caved in resulting in 27 injuries, they improved their performance. In the crucial postponed match at Karaiskakis Stadium against Olympiacos, who were the other contender for the championship, AEK found themselves losing 1–0, but with a sustained counter-attack in the second half they won 1–2, taking the second place, leaving the red and whites one point behind. The crucial match that largely decided the champion took place on the 26th matchday with AEK facing Panathinaikos away from home. AEK started the match decisively losing several chances, however Panathinaikos took a 1–0 lead immediately after the first half hour, while in the second half, Panathinaikos were better and the footballers of AEK were frustrated by not being able to turn the situation around. Thus, AEK were left behind in claiming the championship and in the last matchday, they faced Olympiacos and in front of 25,000 spectators even though they were ahead by 3–1, they eventually were equalized in the 90th minute, resulting in the match ending 3–3 with AEK finishing second in the league.

In the Cup, AEK eliminated Athinaikos and PAOK winning both 4–0 at home for the round of 32 and the round of 16, respectively. In the quarter-finals, they were left out of the institution losing 3–1 from Olympiacos away from home.

== Management team ==
Position	Staff
Manager	(Socialist Federal Republic of Yugoslavia) Mirko Kokotović
Technical director	(Greece) Kleanthis Maropoulos
Academy director	(Greece) Georgios Daispangos
Academy manager	(Greece) Georgios Daispangos
Academy manager	(Greece) Kostas Poulis

== Players ==
=== Squad information ===
NOTE: The players are the ones that have been announced by the AEK Athens' press release. No edits should be made unless a player arrival or exit is announced. Updated 2 July 1965, 23:59 UTC+2.

Player	Nat.	Position(s)	Date of birth (Age)	Signed	Previous club	Transfer fee
Goalkeepers
Stelios Serafidis	(Greece)	GK	6 August 1935 (aged 29)	1953	(Greece) AEK Athens U20	—
Vangelis Petrakis	(Greece)	GK	7 September 1938 (aged 26)	1962	(Greece) Aris	₯500,000
Theodoros Maniateas	(Greece)	GK	19 March 1945 (aged 20)	1963	(Greece) Panthisiakos	Free
Defenders
Alekos Sofianidis	(Greece) (Turkey)	LB / LM / LW	3 August 1935 (aged 29)	1959	(Turkey) Beşiktaş	Free
Aleko Yordan	(Turkey) (Greece)	CB	10 January 1938 (aged 27)	1964	(Turkey) Beykoz	Free
Manolis Kanellopoulos	(Greece)	RB / CB	12 January 1938 (aged 27)	1962	(Greece) Egaleo	Free
Theofilos Vernezis	(Greece)	RB / CB / GK	1938 (aged 26–27)	1956	(Greece) AEK Athens U20	—
Giorgos Kefalidis	(Greece)	RB / CB	21 March 1941 (aged 24)	1964	(Greece) Pierikos	₯800,000
Fotis Balopoulos	(Greece)	CB / DM / CM / ST	17 December 1943 (aged 21)	1964	(Greece) Proodeftiki	₯450,000
Lakis Frogoudakis	(Greece)	LB / RB / CB / DM	1944 (aged 20–21)	1964	(Greece) AEK Athens U20	—
Panagiotis Stasinopoulos	(Greece)	CB	1944 (aged 20–21)	1963	(Greece) AEK Athens U20	—
Midfielders
Miltos Papapostolou	(Greece)	DM / CB	9 September 1935 (aged 29)	1956	(Greece) Egaleo	Free
Giorgos Petridis	(Greece)	AM / SS / ST / LW	10 February 1938 (aged 27)	1957	(Greece) Pera Club	Free
Stelios Skevofilakas	(Greece)	LM / RM / AM / CM	6 January 1939 (aged 26)	1961	(Greece) Eleftheroupoli	Free
Emilios Theofanidis	(Greece)	CM / CB	30 November 1939 (aged 25)	1963	(Greece) Aris Ptolemaida	Free
Fanis Tasinos	(Greece)	LM / CM / LB	28 October 1940 (aged 24)	1963	(Greece) Pagkorinthiakos	₯500,000
Michalis Simigdalas	(Greece)	CM / RM / LM / RB / LB	23 June 1944 (aged 21)	1963	(Greece) AEK Athens U20	—
Forwards
Lefter Küçükandonyadis	(Turkey) (Greece)	LW / RW / SS / ST	22 December 1925 (aged 39)	1964	(Turkey) Fenerbahçe	Free
Kostas Nestoridis	(Greece)	ST / SS / LW / RW	15 March 1930 (aged 35)	1955	(Greece) Panionios	Free
Andreas Stamatiadis (Captain)	(Greece)	RW / LW / SS / AM	16 August 1935 (aged 29)	1952	(Greece) AEK Athens U20	—
Kostas Papageorgiou	(Greece)	ST / SS / RW / LW	1 January 1941 (aged 24)	1963	(Greece) Atromitos	₯200,000
Mimis Papaioannou	(Greece)	SS / ST / AM / RW	17 November 1942 (aged 22)	1962	(Greece) Veria	₯175,000
Spyros Pomonis	(Greece)	LW / LM	12 February 1944 (aged 21)	1960	(Greece) AEK Athens U20	—

== Transfers ==
=== In ===
Pos.	Player	From	Fee	Date	Source
DF	(Greece) Fotis Balopoulos	(Greece) Proodeftiki	₯450,000^{[a]}	30 July 1964	
DF	(Greece) Stamatis Skafidas	(Greece) Panegialios	Loan return	1 July 1964	
DF	(Greece) Giorgos Kefalidis	(Greece) Pierikos	₯800,000	1 July 1964	
DF	(Greece) Lakis Frogoudakis	(Greece) AEK Athens U20	Promotion	1 July 1964	
MF	(Greece) Stefanos Demiris	(Greece) Aris	Loan return	1 July 1964	
FW	(Turkey) Lefter Küçükandonyadis	(Turkey) Fenerbahçe	Free transfer	12 August 1964	
FW	(Greece) Nikos Sevastopoulos	(South Africa) Hellenic	Loan return	9 November 1964	

a. plus Aris Tsachouridis.

=== Out ===
Pos.	Player	To	Fee	Date	Source
DF	(Greece) Giannis Marditsis	(Greece) Korinthos	Free transfer	31 July 1964	
DF	(Greece) Panagiotis Charalampidis	(Greece) Iraklis	Free transfer	1 July 1964	
DF	(Greece) Mimis Anastasiadis	Free agent	Contract termination	1 July 1964	
DF	(Greece) Stamatis Skafidas	(Greece) Panegialios	₯70,000	3 September 1964	
MF	(Greece) Sofos Koulidis	(Greece) Panegialios	Free transfer	28 July 1964	
MF	(Greece) Stefanos Demiris	(Greece) Aris	₯250,000	6 September 1964	
FW	(Greece) Aris Tsachouridis	(Greece) Proodeftiki	Free transfer	30 July 1964	
FW	(Greece) Nikos Sevastopoulos	(Greece) AEK Athens U20	Demotion	9 November 1964	

=== Overall transfer activity ===
Expenditure: ▼ ₯1,250,000

Income: ▲ ₯320,000

Net Total: ▼ ₯930,000

== Pre-season and friendlies ==
5 July 1964 International Soccer League	Zagłębie Sosnowiec	3–0	AEK Athens	New York
19:00 EET (UTC+2)	Jarosik 3', 69'; Szmidt (penalty missed) 75', 76'	Report		Stadium: Downing Stadium; Attendance: 7,840; Referee: Helmut Fritz (West Germany)

10 July 1964 International Soccer League	AEK Athens	0–3	Zagłębie Sosnowiec	Chicago
20:00 EET (UTC+2)	Petridis (red card) 82'	Report	Jarosik 19'; Szmidt 44'; Gałeczka 78' (pen.)	Stadium: Soldier Field; Attendance: 10,000; Referee: Ernest Guignet (Switzerland)
Note: At the 82nd minute, when Petridis was tackled in the opponent's area in the same way that Szmidt won a penalty 4 minutes earlier, didn't face the same treatment by the referee, who didn't award any violation. The player in his anger punched the referee and after an interruption that lasted a few minutes the match continued with the dismissal of Petridis.

12 July 1964 International Soccer League	SV Schwechat	2–1	AEK Athens	New York
15:00 EET (UTC+2)	Zacsek 34', 47'	Report	Papaioannou 89'	Stadium: Downing Stadium; Attendance: 4,351; Referee: Francis McGowan (England)

15 July 1964 Friendly	Toronto City	4–1	AEK Athens	Toronto
	Fleming 5', 67'; Kinloch 25'; Sunlincevski 31'	Report	Nestoridis 60'	Stadium: Varsity Stadium

19 July 1964 International Soccer League	Red Star Belgrade	3–2	AEK Athens	New York
16:00 EET (UTC+2)	Pavlić 3'; Škrbić 54'; Džajić 72'	Report	Nestoridis 23'; Papaioannou 46'	Stadium: Downing Stadium; Attendance: 8,841; Referee: Helmut Fritz (West Germany)
Note: The match ended at the 84th minute due to riots of the crowd towards the referee.

24 July 1964 International Soccer League	Vitória de Guimarães	1–0	AEK Athens	Everett
16:00 EET (UTC+2)	Mendes 26'	Report		Stadium: Everett Memorial Stadium; Attendance: 4,258

26 July 1964 International Soccer League	AEK Athens	0–0	SV Schwechat	New York
14:30 EET (UTC+2)		Report		Stadium: Downing Stadium; Attendance: 7,705; Referee: Aldo Clemente (United States)

16 August 1964 Friendly	AEK Athens	3–1	Proodeftiki	Nea Filadelfeia
17:30 EET (UTC+2)	Theofanidis 30'; Petridis 66'; Karafeskos 85'	Report	Frantzis 25'	Stadium: AEK Stadium; Attendance: 8,617; Referee: Kanellopoulos (Athens)

23 August 1964 Friendly	AEK Athens	8–0	Fostiras	Nea Filadelfeia
17:15 EET (UTC+2)	Pomonis 5'; Nestoridis 6', 30', 47', 83'; Papaioannou 20', 75', 80'	Report	Drosopoulos (penalty missed) 42'	Stadium: AEK Stadium; Attendance: 4,726; Referee: Velentzas (Athens)
Note: Panagiotis Ventouris who was signed from Fostiras for the following season played with AEK.

23 August 1964 Friendly	Ergotelis	0–2	AEK Athens	Heraklion
		Report	Kefalidis 76'; Theofanidis 82'	Stadium: Martineno Stadium; Attendance: 3,000; Referee: Christos Pagiaslis (Piraeus)
Note: Match for the 100th aniversary of Eleftherios Venizelos' birth.

30 August 1964 Friendly	Preveza	1–6	AEK Athens	Preveza
17:00 EET (UTC+2)	Papadiotis 77'	Report	Petridis 5', 14'; Stamatiadis 48'; Papageorgiou 64', 88'; Theofanidis 88'	Stadium: Athanasia Tsoumeleka Municipal Stadium; Attendance: 4,000

30 August 1964 Friendly	AEK Athens	3–2	Panegialios	Nea Filadelfeia
17:15 EET (UTC+2)	Nestoridis 29', 54', 58'	Report	Papazoglou 67'; Zafiropoulos 70'	Stadium: AEK Stadium; Attendance: 7,773; Referee: Christos Michas (Athens)
Note: Panagiotis Ventouris who was signed for the following season played with AEK.

2 September 1964 Friendly	AEK Athens	2–1	Panionios	Nea Filadelfeia
17:00 EET (UTC+2)	Petridis 31', 44'	Report	Yordan 62' (o.g.)	Stadium: AEK Stadium; Attendance: 4,000; Referee: Tsatsoglou

5 September 1964 Friendly	AEK Athens	10–1	PAO Kalogreza	Nea Filadelfeia
17:00 EET (UTC+2)	Nestoridis 2', 10', 20'; Petridis 25'; Papageorgiou 55', 57', 61'; Theofanidis 62', 90'; Kyrmizas 84'	Report	Ioannidis 71'	Stadium: AEK Stadium; Referee: Komninakis (Athens)

6 September 1964 Friendly	AEK Athens	2–0	Atromitos	Nea Filadelfeia
17:00 EET (UTC+2)	Stamatiadis 48'; Nestoridis 75'	Report		Stadium: AEK Stadium; Attendance: 6,000; Referee: Geroukalis (Athens)

12 September 1964 Friendly	AEK Athens	9–2	Egaleo	Nea Filadelfeia
16:30 EET (UTC+2)	Papaioannou 24'; Nestoridis 25', 27'; Petridis 29', 32', 48', 52'; Tasinos 60', 88'	Report	Argyriou 57'; Anastopoulos 85'	Stadium: AEK Stadium

13 September 1964 AFCA Cup	AEK Athens	5–1	Panionios	Nea Filadelfeia
16:30 EET (UTC+2)	Papageorgiou 2', 80'; Theofanidis 36', 57'; Tasinos 59'	Report	Intzoglou 6'	Stadium: AEK Stadium; Attendance: 3,000; Referee: Koutsomichos

20 September 1964 AFCA Cup	AEK Athens	4–1	Apollon Athens	Nea Filadelfeia
16:30 EET (UTC+2)	Petridis 19'; Pomonis 23'; Giannibas 53' (o.g.); Karafeskos 85'	Report	Porychis 48'	Stadium: AEK Stadium; Attendance: 10,000; Referee: Giannis Kalofysoudis (Athens)

23 September 1964 Friendly	AEK Athens	2–0	PAOK	Nea Filadelfeia
16:30 EET (UTC+2)	Nestoridis 26'; Ventouris 85'	Report		Stadium: AEK Stadium; Attendance: 3,000; Referee: Kanellopoulos (Athens)
Note: Panagiotis Ventouris who was signed for the following season played with AEK.

7 October 1964 Friendly	Pammesiniakos	0–1	AEK Athens	Kalamata
		Report	Pomonis 37'	Stadium: Kalamata Municipal Stadium

4 November 1964 Friendly	AEK Athens	5–1	Gyziakos	Nea Filadelfeia
	Papaioannou 25', 32'; Küçükandonyadis 35'; Nestoridis 41'; Vasiliadis 70'	Report	Douniakis 50'	Stadium: AEK Stadium; Referee: Kostas Poulis

21 November 1964 Friendly	AEK Athens	2–1	Greece	Nea Filadelfeia
15:00 EET (UTC+2)	Petridis 36', 58'	Report	Sideris 40' (pen.)	Stadium: AEK Stadium; Attendance: 1,000; Referee: Vaptismas
Note: Giorgos Kefalidis, Alekos Sofianidis, Stelios Skevofilakas and Mimis Papaioannou competed with Greece against their team.

22 November 1964 Friendly	AEK Athens	4–1	Ethnikos Piraeus	Nea Filadelfeia
15:00 EET (UTC+2)	Papageorgiou 3', 15', 43', 64'	Report	Orfanidis 80'	Stadium: AEK Stadium; Attendance: 5,000; Referee: Mandas

29 November 1964 Friendly	Aris	0–0	AEK Athens	Thessaloniki
15:00 EET (UTC+2)		Report		Stadium: Kaftanzoglio Stadium; Attendance: 6,082; Referee: Kanellopoulos (Athens)

16 December 1964 Friendly	AEK Athens	9–0	Rethymniakos	Nea Filadelfeia
15:15 EET (UTC+2)	Papageorgiou 1'; Papaioannou 16', 28'; Tasinos 55', 56', 62'; Karafeskos 58'; Ventouris 66'; Küçükandonyadis 70'	Report		Stadium: AEK Stadium
Note: Panagiotis Ventouris who was signed for the following season played with AEK. Since the referees of the match did not show up, people from the stands took charge instead.

23 December 1964 Friendly	AEK Athens	3–2	Vyzas Megara	Nea Filadelfeia
15:00 EET (UTC+2)	Sevastopoulos 44'; Eleftheriadis 63'; Tasinos 68'	Report	Sourounis 48' (pen.); Kouvas 52'	Stadium: AEK Stadium; Attendance: 1,000; Referee: Tsoukalas

26 December 1964 Friendly	AEK Athens	2–0	Apollon Athens	Nea Filadelfeia
15:00 EET (UTC+2)	Tasinos 29'; Papageorgiou 46'	Report		Stadium: AEK Stadium; Attendance: 5,000; Referee: Levantas

14 March 1965 AFCA Cup	Panathinaikos	1–2	AEK Athens	Ampelokipoi
16:00 EET (UTC+2)	Panagiotidis 60'	Report	Stamatiadis 12'; Papageorgiou 52'	Stadium: Leoforos Alexandras Stadium; Attendance: 10,000; Referee: Christos Michas (Athens)

21 April 1965 Friendly	OFI	1–0	AEK Athens	Heraklion
16:00 EET (UTC+2)	Barbalias 12'	Report	Nestoridis (penalty missed) 17'	Stadium: Theodoros Vardinogiannis Stadium; Attendance: 3,000; Referee: Maniakis
Note: Panagiotis Barbalias of Olympiacos and Dimitris Taktikos of Apollon Athens competed with OFI.

26 April 1965 Tournament of the «4»	AEK Athens	4–1	Panionios	Nea Filadelfeia
17:00 EET (UTC+2)	Papaioannou 3', 78'; Kanellopoulos 32'; Papageorgiou 57'	Report	Chaitas 19'	Stadium: AEK Stadium; Attendance: 8,480; Referee: Mandas

27 April 1965 Tournament of the «4»	AEK Athens	2–1	Proodeftiki	Nea Filadelfeia
17:00 EET (UTC+2)	Papaioannou 15'; Pomonis 70'	Report	Skoufos 90'	Stadium: AEK Stadium; Attendance: 8,000; Referee: Christos Karasoulas (Athens)

2 May 1965 Tournament of the «4»	AEK Athens	1–1	Apollon Athens	Nea Filadelfeia
17:00 EET (UTC+2)	Kefalidis 81'	Report	Kyriakou 15'	Stadium: AEK Stadium; Attendance: 11,314; Referee: Asikis

12 May 1965 Friendly	AEK Athens	3–3	Real Madrid	Nea Filadelfeia
17:00 EET (UTC+2)	Papageorgiou 11'; Papaioannou 16', 45'	Report	Puskás 40'; Pirri 50'; Bueno 57'	Stadium: AEK Stadium; Attendance: 29,158; Referee: Marcello Rancher (Italy)

23 May 1965 Friendly	AE Mytilene	1–5	AEK Athens	Mytilene
	Chatzisevastos 78'	Report	Papageorgiou 12', (penalty missed) 45'; Sevastopoulos 40', 57'; Eleftheriadis 69'; Karafeskos 83'	Stadium: Mytilene Municipal Stadium; Attendance: 7,800; Referee: Fapas
Note: Panagiotis Ventouris who was signed for the following season played with AEK. Two players of Aiolikos competed with AE Mytilene.

1 June 1965 Friendly	AEK Athens	8–0	Athinaikos	Nea Filadelfeia
17:30 EET (UTC+2)	Nestoridis 2', 4', 22', 25', 26', 29'; Papaioannou 15'; Papageorgiou 75'	Report		Stadium: AEK Stadium; Referee: Koutsomichos
Note: Maniateas competed with Athinaikos against AEK for the first half and Serafidis replaced him for the second half.

== Competitions ==
=== Overall record ===
Competition	First match	Last match	Starting round	Final position	Record							
Competition	First match	Last match	Starting round	Final position	Pld	W	D	L	GF	GA	GD	Win %
Alpha Ethniki	27 September 1964	27 June 1965	Matchday 1	2nd	30	18	10	2	64	22	+42	60.00
Greek Cup	4 April 1965	2 July 1965	Round of 32	Quarter-finals	3	2	0	1	9	3	+6	66.67
European Cup Winners' Cup	9 September 1964	16 September 1964	First round	First round	2	1	0	1	2	3	−1	50.00
Total					35	21	10	4	75	28	+47	60.00

Last updated: 2 July 1965
Source: Competitions

=== Alpha Ethniki ===
==== League table ====
Pos	Team	Pld	W	D	L	GF	GA	GD	Pts	Qualification or relegation
1	Panathinaikos (C)	30	20	9	1	76	19	+57	79	Qualification for European Cup preliminary round
2	AEK Athens	30	18	10	2	64	22	+42	76	
3	Olympiacos	30	18	5	7	73	40	+33	71	Qualification for Cup Winners' Cup first round
4	Proodeftiki	30	11	12	7	39	32	+7	64	
5	Pierikos	30	12	8	10	39	39	0	62	

Source: RSSSF
Rules for classification: 1st points; 2nd decision match; 3rd head-to-head goal difference.
(C) Champions

==== Results summary ====
Overall								Home						Away					
Pld	W	D	L	GF	GA	GD	Pts	W	D	L	GF	GA	GD	W	D	L	GF	GA	GD
30	18	10	2	64	22	+42	76	11	4	0	38	12	+26	7	6	2	26	10	+16

Source: Competitive matches

==== Results by Matchday ====
Round	1	2	3	4	5	6	7	8	9	10	11	12	13	14	15	16	17	18	19	20	21	22	23	24	25	26	27	28	29	30
Ground	A	H	A	H	A	H	A	H	A	A	H	H	A	H	A	H	A	H	A	H	A	Η	A	H	H	A	A	H	A	H
Result	D	D	W	W	L	W	D	D	W	W	W	D	D	W	W	W	W	W	D	W	D	W	W	W	W	D	L	W	W	D
Position	6	7	4	2	7	5	5	6	4	4	3	3	3	3	2	2	2	2	3	2	2	2	2	2	2	2	2	2	2	2

Source: Competitive matches
A = Away; H = Home; W = Win; D = Draw; L = Loss; P = Postponed

==== Matches ====
27 September 1964 1	Doxa Drama	1–1	AEK Athens	Drama
16:00 EET (UTC+2)	Ioannou 70'		Nestoridis 75' (pen.)	Stadium: Doxa Drama Stadium; Attendance: 6,000; Referee: Fabio Monti (Italy)

4 October 1964 2	AEK Athens	1–1	Proodeftiki	Nea Filadelfeia
15:45 EET (UTC+2)	Papaioannou 63'		Mavrikos 67'	Stadium: AEK Stadium; Attendance: 15,906; Referee: Petar Djonev (Bulgaria)

10 October 1964 3	Apollon Athens	1–7	AEK Athens	Rizoupoli
15:30 EET (UTC+2)	Papazoglou 57'		Pomonis 55', 75'; Nestoridis 58' (pen.), 72', 89'; Küçükandonyadis 81', 87'	Stadium: Rizoupoli Stadium; Attendance: 10,426; Referee: Thomas Vergotis (Rhodes)

18 October 1964 4	AEK Athens	3–1	Apollon Kalamarias	Nea Filadelfeia
15:30 EET (UTC+2)	Papaioannou 46', 73'; Nestoridis 90' (pen.)		Nifadopoulos 63'	Stadium: AEK Stadium; Attendance: 15,000; Referee: Ermenegildo Piantoni (Italy)

25 October 1964 5	Pierikos	1–0	AEK Athens	Katerini
15:30 EET (UTC+2)	Felekidis 5'			Stadium: Katerini Stadium; Attendance: 6,000; Referee: Paul Strässle (Switzerland)

1 November 1964 6	AEK Athens	2–1	Iraklis	Nea Filadelfeia
15:15 EET (UTC+2)	Nestoridis 25'; Stamatiadis 68'		Balopoulos 2' (o.g.)	Stadium: AEK Stadium; Attendance: 13,778; Referee: Antonio Marchiori (Italy)

8 November 1964 7	Ethnikos Piraeus	0–0	AEK Athens	Piraeus
15:15 EET (UTC+2)				Stadium: Karaiskakis Stadium; Attendance: 38,174; Referee: Lajos Aranyosi (Hungary)

15 November 1964 8	AEK Athens	0–0	Aris	Nea Filadelfeia
15:00 EET (UTC+2)				Stadium: AEK Stadium; Attendance: 28,375; Referee: Hans-Joachim Weyland (West Germany)

6 December 1964 9	Panegialios	2–3	AEK Athens	Aigio
15:00 EET (UTC+2)	Loukanidis 49'; Papadopoulos 90+2'		Papageorgiou 9'; Nestoridis 41', 69'	Stadium: Aigio National Stadium; Attendance: 3,654; Referee: Kostas Xanthos (Dodecanese)

13 December 1964 10	Trikala	0–3	AEK Athens	Trikala
15:00 EET (UTC+2)			Papageorgiou 14', 63'; Nestoridis 25'	Stadium: Trikala Municipal Stadium; Attendance: 7,682; Referee: Janusz Marcinkowski (Poland)

20 December 1964 11	AEK Athens	1–0	PAOK	Nea Filadelfeia
15:00 EET (UTC+2)	Papaioannou 49'			Stadium: AEK Stadium; Attendance: 12,897; Referee: Günter Sparing (West Germany)

3 January 1965 12	AEK Athens	2–2	Panathinaikos	Nea Filadelfeia
15:00 EET (UTC+2)	Sourpis 45+7' (o.g.); Nestoridis 58'		Loukanidis (red card) 5'; Papoutsakis 32'; Stamatiadis 48' (o.g.)	Stadium: AEK Stadium; Attendance: 34,054; Referee: Willi Thier (West Germany)
Note: The first half ended with a 10-minute delay, due to the protests of Panathinaikos for the sent-off of Loukanidis and the injury of Andreou at the 32nd minute.

10 January 1965 13	Niki Volos	0–0	AEK Athens	Volos
15:00 EET (UTC+2)				Stadium: Niki Volos Stadium; Attendance: 4,404; Referee: Heinz Siebert (West Germany)

17 January 1965 14	AEK Athens	1–0	Panionios	Nea Filadelfeia
15:00 EET (UTC+2)	Nestoridis 13'		Kazantzidis (red card) 85'	Stadium: AEK Stadium; Attendance: 13,134; Referee: Fabio Monti (Italy)

7 April 1965 15	Olympiacos	1–2	AEK Athens	Piraeus
16:30 EET (UTC+2)	Papazoglou 30'		Papageorgiou 57'; Papaioannou 63'	Stadium: Karaiskakis Stadium; Attendance: 42,415; Referee: Bruno De Marchi (Italy)
Note: The match was initially played on January 24, despite it rained incessantly all day and the pitch had become muddy. Nevertheless, 35,000 supporters of both clubs were gathered, which led to the German referee Horst Mathieu to allow the conduct of the match. At the 32nd minute the rain intensified and the referee tried to suspend the match but the supporters threatened to invade the pitch, which resulted in its continuation until the end of the first half. After the half-time break, the referee went out on the pitch with the captains of both clubs, Stamatiadis and Polychroniou and decided the suspension of the match which at that point was 0–0.

31 January 1965 16	AEK Athens	6–0	Doxa Drama	Nea Filadelfeia
15:30 EET (UTC+2)	Nestoridis 7'; Papaioannou 39', 53', 80'; Pomonis 45'; Stamatiadis 49'			Stadium: AEK Stadium; Attendance: 13,775; Referee: Kostas Xanthos (Dodecanese)

6 February 1965 17	Proodeftiki	0–2	AEK Athens	Piraeus
15:30 EET (UTC+2)			Nestoridis 40', 43'	Stadium: Karaiskakis Stadium; Attendance: 22,875

14 February 1965 18	AEK Athens	2–1	Apollon Athens	Nea Filadelfeia
15:30 EET (UTC+2)	Skevofilakas 18'; Papaioannou 37'		Papazoglou 25' (pen.)	Stadium: AEK Stadium; Attendance: 17,324; Referee: Giannis Korkidis (Athens)

21 February 1965 19	Apollon Kalamarias	0–0	AEK Athens	Thessaloniki
15:30 EET (UTC+2)				Stadium: Aris Stadium; Attendance: 4,859; Referee: Edgar Deuschel (West Germany)

28 February 1965 20	AEK Athens	3–1	Pierikos	Nea Filadelfeia
15:30 EET (UTC+2)	Nestoridis 38'; Papageorgiou 41'; Pomonis 81'		Amanatidis 42'	Stadium: AEK Stadium; Attendance: 13,268; Referee: Joseph Heymann (Switzerland)

7 March 1965 21	Iraklis	2–2	AEK Athens	Thessaloniki
16:00 EET (UTC+2)	Pomonis 5'; Papaioannou 22'		Tsigos 21'; Xilas 39'	Stadium: Kaftanzoglio Stadium; Attendance: 8,356; Referee: Thodoros Giavropoulos (Piraeus)

21 March 1965 22	AEK Athens	3–0	Ethnikos Piraeus	Nea Filadelfeia
16:00 EET (UTC+2)	Stamatiadis 37'; Kefalidis 45', (red card) 83'; Petridis 54'			Stadium: AEK Stadium; Attendance: 3,425; Referee: Fabio Monti (Italy)

28 March 1965 23	Aris	0–1	AEK Athens	Thessaloniki
16:30 EET (UTC+2)			Nestoridis 39'	Stadium: Toumba Stadium; Attendance: 5,961; Referee: Alessandro D'Agostini (Italy)

14 April 1965 24	AEK Athens	3–2	Panegialios	Nea Filadelfeia
16:30 EET (UTC+2)	Nestoridis 23'; Petridis 75'; Papageorgiou 80'		Zafiropoulos 9'; Alefantos 85'	Stadium: Nikos Goumas Stadium; Attendance: 13,240; Referee: Giannis Famelis (Athens)

9 May 1965 25	AEK Athens	3–0	Trikala	Nea Filadelfeia
17:00 EET (UTC+2)	Papaioannou 71'; Papageorgiou 88'; Pantazis 89' (o.g.)			Stadium: AEK Stadium; Attendance: 16,804; Referee: Ewald Epping (West Germany)

16 May 1965 26	PAOK	1–1	AEK Athens	Thessaloniki
17:00 EET (UTC+2)	Apostolidis 27'		Papageorgiou 53'	Stadium: Toumba Stadium; Attendance: 9,378; Referee: Eugen Boller (Switzerland)

6 June 1965 27	Panathinaikos	1–0	AEK Athens	Ampelokipoi
17:30 EET (UTC+2)	Loukanidis 32'			Stadium: Leoforos Alexandras Stadium; Attendance: 24,915; Referee: Rudibert Jacobi (West Germany)

13 June 1965 28	AEK Athens	5–0	Niki Volos	Nea Filadelfeia
17:30 EET (UTC+2)	Papageorgiou 8', 33', 41', 87'; Stamatiadis 60'			Stadium: AEK Stadium; Attendance: 4,953; Referee: Giuliano Acernese (Italy)

19 June 1965 29	Panionios	0–4	AEK Athens	Nea Smyrni
17:30 EET (UTC+2)			Papageorgiou 10'; Papaioannou 23'; Pomonis 25', 80'	Stadium: Nea Smyrni Stadium; Attendance: 11,324; Referee: Giovanni Sebastio (Italy)

27 June 1965 30	AEK Athens	3–3	Olympiacos	Nea Filadelfeia
17:30 EET (UTC+2)	Papaioannou 8'; Papageorgiou 49', 75'		Vasiliou 30'; Botinos 81'; Sideris 89'	Stadium: AEK Stadium; Attendance: 14,200; Referee: Elio Schinetti (Italy)

=== Greek Cup ===
AEK entered the Greek Cup at the round of 32.

==== Matches ====
4 April 1965 Round of 32	AEK Athens	4–0	Athinaikos	Nea Filadelfeia
16:00 EET (UTC+2)	Papageorgiou 54', 61', 74', 83'; Nestoridis (penalty missed) 70'			Stadium: AEK Stadium; Referee: Velentzas (Athens)

18 April 1965 Round of 16	AEK Athens	4–0	PAOK	Nea Filadelfeia
16:00 EET (UTC+2)	Nestoridis 35' (pen.), 66'; Papageorgiou 63'; Papaioannou 89'			Stadium: AEK Stadium; Attendance: 11,066; Referee: Günter Linn (West Germany)

2 July 1965 Quarter-finals	Olympiacos	3–1	AEK Athens	Piraeus
21:00 EET (UTC+2)	Sideris 17', 40', 51'		Kefalidis 81'	Stadium: Karaiskakis Stadium; Attendance: 42,463; Referee: Rudolf Schreiner (West Germany)

=== European Cup Winners' Cup ===
==== First round ====
9 September 1964 First leg	AEK Athens (Greece)	2–0	(Socialist Federal Republic of Yugoslavia) Dinamo Zagreb	Athens, Greece
16:45 EET (UTC+2)	Papaioannou 75'; Nestoridis 80'	Report	Kobeščak (red card) 67'	Stadium: AEK Stadium; Attendance: 23,650; Referee: Mihai Popa (Romania)
Note: First victory in a UEFA match for AEK Athens.

16 September 1964 Second leg	Dinamo Zagreb (Socialist Federal Republic of Yugoslavia)	3–0 (3–2 agg.)	(Greece) AEK Athens	Zagreb, Yugoslavia
17:00 EET (UTC+2)	Lamza 45+1'; Zambata 50'; Jerković 57'; Zambata (red card) 85'	Report	Pomonis (red card) 78'	Stadium: Stadion Maksimir; Attendance: 10,418; Referee: Petre Sotir (Romania)

== Statistics ==
=== Squad statistics ===
As of 2 July 1965

No.	Pos	Player	Alpha Ethniki		Greek Cup		European Cup Winners' Cup		Total	
No.	Pos	Player	Apps	Goals	Apps	Goals	Apps	Goals	Apps	Goals
Goalkeepers
—	GK	(Kingdom of Greece) Stelios Serafidis	16	0	1	0	2	0	19	0
—	GK	(Kingdom of Greece) Vangelis Petrakis	15	0	2	0	0	0	17	0
—	GK	(Kingdom of Greece) Theodoros Maniateas	0	0	0	0	0	0	0	0
Defenders
—	DF	(Kingdom of Greece) Alekos Sofianidis	25	0	2	0	2	0	29	0
—	DF	(Turkey) Aleko Yordan	21	0	3	0	2	0	26	0
—	DF	(Kingdom of Greece) Manolis Kanellopoulos	5	0	2	0	0	0	7	0
—	DF	(Kingdom of Greece) Theofilos Vernezis	2	0	1	0	0	0	3	0
—	DF	(Kingdom of Greece) Giorgos Kefalidis	26	1	1	1	2	0	29	2
—	DF	(Kingdom of Greece) Fotis Balopoulos	30	0	3	0	2	0	35	0
—	DF	(Kingdom of Greece) Lakis Frogoudakis	3	0	0	0	0	0	3	0
—	DF	(Kingdom of Greece) Panagiotis Stasinopoulos	5	0	0	0	0	0	5	0
Midfielders
—	MF	(Kingdom of Greece) Miltos Papapostolou	8	0	0	0	0	0	8	0
—	MF	(Kingdom of Greece) Giorgos Petridis	23	2	2	0	2	0	27	2
—	MF	(Kingdom of Greece) Stelios Skevofilakas	25	1	3	0	2	0	30	1
—	MF	(Kingdom of Greece) Emilios Theofanidis	1	0	0	0	0	0	1	0
—	MF	(Kingdom of Greece) Fanis Tasinos	2	0	0	0	1	0	3	0
—	MF	(Kingdom of Greece) Michalis Simigdalas	0	0	0	0	0	0	0	0
Forwards
—	FW	(Turkey) Lefter Küçükandonyadis	5	2	0	0	0	0	5	2
—	FW	(Kingdom of Greece) Kostas Nestoridis	26	17	2	2	2	1	30	20
—	FW	(Kingdom of Greece) Andreas Stamatiadis	28	4	3	0	2	0	33	4
—	FW	(Kingdom of Greece) Kostas Papageorgiou	18	15	3	5	0	0	21	20
—	FW	(Kingdom of Greece) Mimis Papaioannou	30	13	3	1	1	1	34	15
—	FW	(Kingdom of Greece) Spyros Pomonis	16	7	2	0	2	0	20	7

=== Goalscorers ===
As of 2 July 1965
The list is sorted by competition order when total goals are equal, then by position and then alphabetically by surname.

Rank	Pos.	Player	Alpha Ethniki	Greek Cup	European Cup Winners' Cup	Total
1	FW	(Greece) Kostas Nestoridis	17	2	1	20
1	FW	(Greece) Kostas Papageorgiou	15	5	0	20
3	FW	(Greece) Mimis Papaioannou	13	1	1	15
4	FW	(Greece) Spyros Pomonis	7	0	0	7
5	FW	(Greece) Andreas Stamatiadis	4	0	0	4
6	MF	(Greece) Giorgos Petridis	2	0	0	2
6	FW	(Turkey) Lefter Küçükandonyadis	2	0	0	2
6	DF	(Greece) Giorgos Kefalidis	1	1	0	2
9	MF	(Greece) Stelios Skevofilakas	1	0	0	1
Own goals			2	0	0	2
Totals			64	9	2	75

=== Hat-tricks ===
Numbers in superscript represent the goals that the player scored.

Player	Against	Result	Date	Competition	Source
(Greece) Kostas Nestoridis	(Greece) Apollon Athens	7–1 (A)	10 October 1964	Alpha Ethniki	
(Greece) Mimis Papaioannou	(Greece) Doxa Drama	6–0 (H)	31 January 1965	Alpha Ethniki	
(Greece) Kostas Papageorgiou^{4}	(Greece) Athinaikos	4–0 (H)	4 April 1965	Greek Cup	
(Greece) Kostas Papageorgiou^{4}	(Greece) Niki Volos	5–0 (H)	13 June 1965	Alpha Ethniki	

=== Clean sheets ===
As of 2 July 1965
The list is sorted by competition order when total clean sheets are equal and then alphabetically by surname. Clean sheets in games where both goalkeepers participated are awarded to the goalkeeper who started the game. Goalkeepers with no appearances are not included.

Rank	Player	Alpha Ethniki	Greek Cup	European Cup Winners' Cup	Total
1	(Greece) Vangelis Petrakis	8	1	0	9
2	(Greece) Stelios Serafidis	6	1	1	8
Totals		14	2	1	17

=== Disciplinary record ===
As of 2 July 1965

N	P	Nat.	Name	Alpha Ethniki			Greek Cup			European Cup Winners' Cup			Total			Notes
N	P	Nat.	Name	Yellow card	Second yellow card	Red card	Yellow card	Second yellow card	Red card	Yellow card	Second yellow card	Red card	Yellow card	Second yellow card	Red card	Notes
Goalkeepers
—	GK	(Kingdom of Greece)	Stelios Serafidis													
—	GK	(Kingdom of Greece)	Vangelis Petrakis													
—	GK	(Kingdom of Greece)	Theodoros Maniateas													
Defenders
—	DF	(Kingdom of Greece)	Alekos Sofianidis													
—	DF	(Turkey)	Aleko Yordan													
—	DF	(Kingdom of Greece)	Manolis Kanellopoulos													
—	DF	(Kingdom of Greece)	Theofilos Vernezis													
—	DF	(Kingdom of Greece)	Giorgos Kefalidis			1									1	
—	DF	(Kingdom of Greece)	Fotis Balopoulos													
—	DF	(Kingdom of Greece)	Lakis Frogoudakis													
—	DF	(Kingdom of Greece)	Panagiotis Stasinopoulos													
Midfielders
—	MF	(Kingdom of Greece)	Miltos Papapostolou													
—	MF	(Kingdom of Greece)	Giorgos Petridis													
—	MF	(Kingdom of Greece)	Stelios Skevofilakas													
—	MF	(Kingdom of Greece)	Emilios Theofanidis													
—	MF	(Kingdom of Greece)	Fanis Tasinos													
—	MF	(Kingdom of Greece)	Michalis Simigdalas													
Forwards
—	FW	(Turkey)	Lefter Küçükandonyadis													
—	FW	(Kingdom of Greece)	Kostas Nestoridis													
—	FW	(Kingdom of Greece)	Andreas Stamatiadis													
—	FW	(Kingdom of Greece)	Kostas Papageorgiou													
—	FW	(Kingdom of Greece)	Mimis Papaioannou													
—	FW	(Kingdom of Greece)	Spyros Pomonis									1			1	

=== Starting 11 ===
This section presents the most frequently used formation along with the players with the most starts across all competitions.

N.	Formation	Matchday(s)
35	WW	1–30

Nat.	Player	Pos.
(Greece)	Stelios Serafidis	GK
(Greece)	Giorgos Kefalidis	RCB
(Turkey)	Aleko Yordan	CB
(Greece)	Alekos Sofianidis	LCB
(Greece)	Fotis Balopoulos	RCM
(Greece)	Stelios Skevofilakas	LCM
(Greece)	Kostas Papageorgiou	SS
(Greece)	Andreas Stamatiadis (C)	RW
(Greece)	Giorgos Petridis	LW
(Greece)	Kostas Nestoridis	RCF
(Greece)	Mimis Papaioannou	LCF

Last updated: 1965-07-02
