= Theodoros Maniateas =

Greek footballer

- Theodoros Maniateas

Personal information
- Full name: Theodoros Maniateas
- Date of birth: 19 March 1945
- Place of birth: Athens, Greece
- Date of death: 20 September 2014 (aged 69)
- Place of death: Athens, Greece
- Position: Goalkeeper

Youth career
- 1957–1963: Panthisaikos
- 1963–1966: AEK Athens

Senior career*
Years	Team	Apps	(Gls)
1963–1969	AEK Athens	18	(0)
Total		18	(0)

International career
1964–1965	Greece U19		

Managerial career
- 1985: Aris Skala
- Asteras Amaliada
- Anagennisi Karditsa
- Antagoras Kos
- * Club domestic league appearances and goals

Theodoros Maniateas (Greek: Θεόδωρος Μανιατέας; 19 March 1945 – 20 September 2014) was a Greek professional footballer who played as a goalkeeper.

== Club career ==
Maniateas started his career at the age of 12 as a striker at Panthisaikos. The club's personnel, realizing his football skills, relocated him to the position of goalkeeper. The officials of the big clubs did not take long to recognize his pontential and put him under surveillance. Olympiacos were the first club to invite him for a try-out in a training match at Nea Smyrni Stadium, where he received flattering comments from the strikers of the red and whites, Giorgos Sideris and Aris Papazoglou, who indicated his acquisition.

In the summer of 1963, Maniateas eventually signed for AEK Athens. He was the third choice goalkeeper behind Stelios Serafidis and Vangelis Petrakis. His co-existence with the other two goalkeepers did not leave him enough chances for participation. During his time at the club he got opportunities to compete in Cup matches against smaller clubs, as well as in friendly matches. In the summer of 1966, as part of the team's pre-season, AEK traveled to New York City, where in a friendly tournament they faced the Santos of Pelé, Eusébio's Benfica and the expatriate Greek American. On 26 August, Maniateas played as a starter in the match against Santos and made a sensational appearance despite their eventuall 1–0 defeat. His appearance caused Pelé to admire and bow to the face of the Greek goalkeeper, while the organizers awarded him a golden watch, a valuable possession by the standards of the time, for being the player of the tournament. He was a member of the squad that won second place in the Balkans Cup in 1967, losing only in the final by Fenerbahçe. He was a regular player in the team that reached the quarter-finals of the European Cup in 1969. During his spell at AEK, he won the championship in 1968 and the Cup in 1966.

In the summer of 1969, frustrated by his lack of participation, he clashed with the administration and technical leadership of the club, resulting in his release from the club with the consent of the manager, Branko Stanković. Olympiacos immediately tried to signed him, but they eventually failed, after a financial disagreement. He continued to train with Olympiacos and compete with them in friendly matches, until the summer of 1970 when he retired at the age of just 25.

== International career ==
Maniateas shared with Vasilis Konstantinou the position of goalkeeper of the National Youth Team, where they played in the European Championship in 1964 and 1965.

== Managerial career ==
Maniateas subsequently obtained a coaching diploma and managed several clubs, including Aris Skala, Asteras Amaliada, Anagennisi Karditsa and Antagoras Kos.

== Personal life ==
His uncle, Theodoros was one of the 200 communist members of the Greek Resistance that were executed on 1 May 1944 by the Nazi at Kaisariani.

Maniateas was married and had three children. During his playing career at AEK, he also co-owned a Pro-Po betting agency in Athens with his then teammate, Aleko Yordan. He regularly attended AEK and the club's Veterans Association events. On 20 September 2014, he died at the age of 69, after a 5-year struggle with lung cancer.

== Career statistics ==
=== Club ===
Appearances and goals by club, season and competition
Club	Season	League			Cup		Continental (Note: Also includes Balkans Cup.)		Total	
Club	Season	Division	Apps	Goals	Apps	Goals	Apps	Goals	Apps	Goals
AEK Athens	1963–64	Alpha Ethniki	0	0	0	0	0	0	0	0
AEK Athens	1964–65	Alpha Ethniki	0	0	0	0	0	0	0	0
AEK Athens	1965–66	Alpha Ethniki	1	0	0	0	0	0	1	0
AEK Athens	1966–67	Alpha Ethniki	2	0	0	0	4	0	6	0
AEK Athens	1967–68	Alpha Ethniki	11	0	0	0	4	0	15	0
AEK Athens	1968–69	Alpha Ethniki	4	0	0	0	2	0	0	0
Career total			18	0	0	0	10	0	28	0

== Honours ==
AEK Athens

- Alpha Ethniki: 1967–68
- Greek Cup: 1965–66
