= Stelios Skevofilakas =

Greek footballer and manager (1939–2009)

- Skevofilax with AEK

Personal information
- Full name: Stylianos Skevofilakas
- Date of birth: 6 January 1939
- Place of birth: Nea Ionia, Greece
- Date of death: 10 June 2009 (aged 70)
- Place of death: Athens, Greece
- Height: 1.80 m (5 ft 11 in)
- Position: Midfielder

Youth career
- 1949–1954: Eleftheroupoli

Senior career*
Years	Team	Apps	(Gls)
1954–1961	Eleftheroupoli		
1961	→ AEK Athens (loan)	0	(0)
1961–1972	AEK Athens	308	(16)
1972–1973	Atromitos	29	(2)
Total		337	(18)

International career
1962	Greece military	8	(2)
1963–1966	Greece	11	(0)

Managerial career
- 1974–1975: Koukouvaounes
- 1977–1978: Marko
- 1979–1980: Ionikos
- 1982–1983: Kerkyra
- 1983–1984: Olympiacos Chalkida
- 1996–1997: Niki Volos
- * Club domestic league appearances and goals

Stelios Skevofilakas (Greek: Στέλιος Σκευοφύλακας; 6 January 1939 – 10 June 2009) was a Greek professional footballer who played as a midfielder mostly for AEK Athens and later a manager.

== Club career ==
Skevofilakas started his football career in 1949 in the youth team at one of his neighborhood clubs, Eleftheroupoli. In 1954 he was promoted to senior team. In 1955 a serious injury of his ankle kept him out of action for about two years. He eventually returned to Eleftheroupoli and was established as main player in their squad. He could play in the midfield positions and especially as a wide midfielder. In 1961, despite the interest of Panathinaikos, Skevofilakas was transferred to AEK Athens.

His official debut with the yellow and black jersey was at Rizoupoli Stadium on 9 September 1961, in the victory of AEK over Egaleo by 8–0, where he provided three assists in the two goals of Nestoridis at the 40th and 43rd minute and a goal of Stamatiadis at the 65th minute. Skevofilakas won 3 championships and 2 Greek Cups, while he was a member of the team that played in the European Cup quarter finals in 1969 against Spartak Trnava, losing by a margin the opportunity to face Johan Cruyff's Ajax in the semi-finals. The intention of the club's then manager, Branko Stanković to renew the club's roster, brought Skevofilakas to leave AEK among other players, in 1972 and move to Atromitos.

On 21 May 1973, Skevofilakas alongside Balopoulos, Psychogios and Kefalidis, who were all released from AEK and signed for Atromitos, started in the match against their former club at Peristeri Stadium, where the match ended with a 1–0 victory for the hosts. It was the first time that they played against AEK, while Lakis Nikolaou, made his maiden participation against his former club, with the yellow-blacks. He retired as a footballer in the summer of 1973, at the age of 34.

== International career ==
Skevofilakas was part of the Greek military team, with whom he won the World Military Cup in 1962.

Skevofilakas made 11 appearances for the Greece, playing in qualifying matches for the 1966 FIFA World Cup and UEFA Euro 1968. He made his debut in May 1963 at an away friendly match against Poland, which ended 4–0.

== Managerial career ==
After his playing career was over, Skevofilakas began coaching, mainly with lower division clubs. On 24 July 1977 he signed for Marko. In the summer of 1979 he took over as the new manager of Ionikos. In 1982 he was the manager of Kerkyra for a season. In the summer of 1983 he became the manager of Olympiacos Chalkida. In 1996, Skevofilakas took charge of the bench of newly promoted second division club, Niki Volos for a season, where he managed to finish in the seventh place of the league.

== Personal life ==
Skevofilakas was the cousin of Giannis Vlantis and uncle of the latter's son, Giorgos, who both played for AEK. His brother, Notis played for the reserve team of AEK and was involved in the Veterans Association of AEK Athens.

Skevofilakas participated in the events of the Veterans Association of AEK Athens, which he served as president for eight consecutive years. On 21 January 2009, he made an unexpected visit to the gathering for the New Year's Eve of the Veterans of AEK, as their president, to wish all of them health. It was his last public appearance, since on 10 June 2009, Skevofilakas died from stomach cancer after a struggle of 18 months. On 20 January 2016, AEK organized a football tournament in his memory.

== Career statistics ==
=== Club ===
Appearances and goals by club, season and competition
Club	Season	League (Note: Also includes play-off matches.)			Greek Cup		Europe		Balkans Cup		Total	
Club	Season	Division	Apps	Goals	Apps	Goals	Apps	Goals	Apps	Goals	Apps	Goals
AEK Athens	1960–61	Alpha Ethniki	0	0	0	0	0	0	1	0	1	0
AEK Athens	1961–62	Alpha Ethniki	30	3	1	0	0	0	0	0	31	3
AEK Athens	1962–63	Alpha Ethniki	30	1	2	0	0	0	0	0	32	1
AEK Athens	1963–64	Alpha Ethniki	29	1	4	0	2	0	0	0	35	1
AEK Athens	1964–65	Alpha Ethniki	25	1	3	0	2	0	0	0	30	1
AEK Athens	1965–66	Alpha Ethniki	27	1	2	0	0	0	0	0	29	1
AEK Athens	1966–67	Alpha Ethniki	23	2	3	1	2	0	7	0	35	3
AEK Athens	1967–68	Alpha Ethniki	31	0	3	0	0	0	5	0	39	0
AEK Athens	1968–69	Alpha Ethniki	32	4	2	0	6	0	0	0	40	4
AEK Athens	1969–70	Alpha Ethniki	30	0	1	0	0	0	0	0	31	0
AEK Athens	1970–71	Alpha Ethniki	26	2	8	3	2	0	0	0	36	5
AEK Athens	1971–72	Alpha Ethniki	25	1	2	0	0	0	0	0	27	1
Atromitos	1972–73	Alpha Ethniki	29	2	0	0	0	0	0	0	29	2
Career total			337	18	31	4	14	0	13	0	395	22

=== International ===
Appearances and goals by national team and year
National team	Year	Apps	Goals
Greece	1963	3	0
Greece	1964	4	0
Greece	1965	3	0
Greece	1966	1	0
Total		11	0

== Honours ==
AEK Athens

- Alpha Ethniki: 1962–63, 1967–68, 1970–71
- Greek Cup: 1963–64, 1965–66

Greece military

- World Military Cup: 1962
