= Nikos Simigdalas =

Greek footballer

Personal information
- Full name: Nikolaos Simigdalas
- Date of birth: 11 July 1942 (age 84)
- Place of birth: Nea Filadelfeia, Athens, Greece
- Position: Striker

Youth career
- 1956–1961: Apollon Athens

Senior career*
| Years | Team | Apps | (Gls) |
| 1961–1973 | Apollon Athens | | |
| 1973–1975 | Panegialios | | |

International career
| 1965 | Greece | 1 | (0) |

Managerial career
- 1975: Athinais
- 1976: Achlilleas Acharnes
- 1976: Apollon Athens U15
- 1976: Apollon Athens
- 1976–1977: Ilioupoli
- 1977–1980: Athinaikos
- Pannafpliakos
- Doxa Vyronas
- 1997: Triglia Rafina
- * Club domestic league appearances and goals

Nikos Simigdalas (Greek: Νίκος Σιμιγδαλάς; born 11 July 1942) is a Greek former professional footballer who played as a striker and a former manager. He played in one match for the Greece national football team in 1965.

== Personal life ==
His younger brother, Michalis, was also a footballer, and they played together at Apollon Athens, while he also coached him at Ilioupoli.

== Honours ==
Apollon Athens

- Beta Ethniki: 1969–70, 1972–73 (First group)
