= Fanis Tasinos =

Greek footballer

- Fanis Tasinos with AEK Athens

Personal information
- Full name: Theofanis Tasinos
- Date of birth: 28 October 1940
- Place of birth: Corinth, Greece
- Date of death: 22 April 2018 (aged 77)
- Place of death: Corinth, Greece
- Height: 1.74 m (5 ft 9 in)
- Positions: Midfielder; left back

Youth career
- 1954–1957: Achilleas Korinthos

Senior career*
Years	Team	Apps	(Gls)
1957–1963	Pagkorinthiakos		
1957–1958	→ Panargiakos (loan)		
1963–1967	AEK Athens	28	(4)
1966–1967	→ Corinthians Johannesburg (loan)		
1967–1970	Korinthos		

Managerial career
- 1976–1977: Olympiacos Loutraki
- * Club domestic league appearances and goals

Fanis Tasinos (Greek: Φάνης Τασίνος; 28 October 1940 – 22 April 2018) was a Greek professional footballer who played as a midfielder.

== Club career ==
Tasinos started playing football at the age of 14 at Achilleas Korinthos, where Vangelis Boufis, an official of the club and his employer, gave him a sport's card. Despite the desire of Olympiacos Korinthos to sign him, he was loaned to Panargiakos for a year. The end of his loan and his return to Achilleas coincided with their merge with Olympiacos Korinthos, where Pagkorinthiakos was created. With Pagkorinthiakos he competed in the first national division championship in 1959.

In the summer of 1963, AEK Athens and Panathinaikos were interested for his acquisition. The "greens" offered Pagkorinthiakos 300,000 drachmas and four players as an exchange, while the President of AEK, Nikos Goumas offered 500,000 drachmas. Tasinos eventually signed for the yellow-blacks with the help of the President of Pagkorinthiakos, Marinos Psomas. With AEK he played for four seasons and made the highlight of his career playing in both matches against Monaco for the qualifying phase of the European Cup, even scoring and 1 goal in the first leg in Monaco on 18 September 1963 which ended in a 7–2 defeat. On 24 August 1966 Tasinos traveled to South Africa, after being invited by relatives who lived there. During his stay he played for Corinthians Johannesburg. On 6 February 1967, he returned to AEK, but he did not manage to make further appearances. During his spell in the club he won the Greek Cup twice, in 1964 and in 1966. In the summer of 1967 he returned to Korinthos.

== Managerial career ==
On 9 September 1976 Tasinos was hired as the manager of Olympiacos Loutraki.

== Personal life ==
Tasinos died at the age of 77 on 22 April 2018.

== Honours ==
Pagkorinthiakos

- Beta Ethniki: 1961–62, 1962–63

AEK Athens

- Greek Cup: 1963–64, 1965–66
