= 1965–66 Alpha Ethniki =

30th season of top-tier football league in Greece

Alpha Ethniki
- Season: 1965–66
- Champions: Olympiacos; 16th Greek title
- Relegated: Panegialios; Niki Volos
- European Cup: Olympiacos
- Cup Winners' Cup: AEK Athens
- Inter-Cities Fairs Cup: Aris
- Matches: 240
- Goals: 668 (2.78 per match)
- Top goalscorer: Mimis Papaioannou (23 goals)

The 1965–66 Alpha Ethniki was the 30th season of the highest football league of Greece. The season began on 28 November 1965 and ended on 19 June 1966. Olympiacos won their 16th Greek title and their first in seven years.

The point system was: Win: 3 points - Draw: 2 points - Loss: 1 point.

== Teams ==
Promoted from 1964–65 Beta Ethniki	Relegated from 1964–65 Alpha Ethniki
Egaleo; Panserraikos	Apollon Kalamarias; Doxa Drama

Location of teams in 1965–66 Alpha Ethniki

== League table ==
Pos	Team	Pld	W	D	L	GF	GA	GD	Pts	Qualification or relegation
1	Olympiacos (C)	30	23	4	3	67	18	+49	80	Qualification for European Cup first round
2	Panathinaikos	30	23	3	4	85	24	+61	79	
3	AEK Athens (Note: AEK Athens were deducted 2 points.)	30	19	5	6	58	26	+32	71	Qualification for Cup Winners' Cup first round
4	Panionios (Note: Panionios were deducted 1 point.)	30	12	7	11	38	37	+1	60	
5	Aris	30	11	8	11	42	42	0	60	Invitation for Inter-Cities Fairs Cup first round
6	PAOK	30	10	9	11	43	49	−6	59	
7	Ethnikos Piraeus	30	12	4	14	43	42	+1	58	
8	Pierikos	30	12	3	15	40	40	0	57	
9	Egaleo	30	9	8	13	43	54	−11	56	
10	Apollon Athens	30	9	8	13	29	37	−8	56	
11	Trikala	30	9	8	13	38	56	−18	56	
12	Iraklis	30	10	6	14	23	43	−20	56	
13	Proodeftiki	30	8	9	13	42	48	−6	55 (Note: Relegation play-out: Panserraikos–Panegialios 1–0, Panegialios–Proodeftiki 1–0, Proodeftiki–Panserraikos 2–1, Panegialios were relegated due to the worst goal average.)	
14	Panserraikos	30	8	9	13	29	42	−13	55	
15	Panegialios (R)	30	10	5	15	27	44	−17	55	Relegation to Beta Ethniki
16	Niki Volos (R)	30	4	6	20	20	65	−45	44	Relegation to Beta Ethniki

Source: RSSSF
Rules for classification: 1st points; 2nd decision match; 3rd head-to-head goal difference.
(C) Champions; (R) Relegated

== Results ==
Home \ Away	AEK	APA	ARIS	EGA	ETH	IRA	NIK	OLY	PAO	PNE	PAN	PNS	PAOK	PIE	PRO	TRI
AEK Athens		0–0	2–0	4–1	2–1	3–0	6–0	0–2	0–2 (Note: AEK Athens-Panathinaikos 1–2, forfeit 0–2.)	2–0	5–1	2–1	5–1	3–0	2–1	3–1
Apollon Athens	0–2		1–0	2–0	1–0	2–0	1–1	1–2	0–1	1–1	1–0	3–3	0–0	3–0	1–0	1–0
Aris	2–1	1–1		3–1	4–2	3–0	1–0	0–3	2–2	2–0	1–0	0–0	5–1	1–2	3–0	2–0
Egaleo	0–1	2–2	3–3		1–3	1–1	5–2	0–1	2–5	2–0	1–0	1–0	1–0	1–2	2–1	3–1
Ethnikos Piraeus	0–0	1–0	6–1	1–2		1–0	3–1	0–4	0–2	2–0	0–1	2–0	5–0	2–1	2–1	4–1
Iraklis	0–0	1–0	2–1	0–0	1–1		4–1	0–2	0–5	1–0	2–1	1–0	0–0	1–0	1–3	2–0
Niki Volos	0–3	1–0	0–1	1–1	1–1	2–3		1–0	0–5	2–1	1–3	1–1	0–3	2–0	0–2	0–1
Olympiacos	4–0	3–0	0–0	1–1	5–0	2–1	3–0		1–0	3–0	1–4	2–1	2–0	2–1	4–1	1–0
Panathinaikos	2–3	2–0	4–0	4–1	4–1	1–0	5–0	1–1		6–0	2–0	5–1	2–0	1–0	4–2	4–1
Panegialios	0–2	0–2	2–1	1–0	1–0	1–0	3–0	0–3	0–3		1–1	1–0	1–0	5–1	0–0	2–2
Panionios	0–1	2–1	1–0	1–1	2–1	3–0	0–0	0–2 (Note: Panionios-Olympiacos 1–1, forfeit 0–2.)	2–1	2–2		1–0	2–2	1–0	1–1	3–1
Panserraikos	2–0 (Note: AEK Athens did not show up. Awarded to Panserraikos.)	3–2	2–2	1–1	1–0	3–0	1–0	1–1	0–4	0–3	3–2		2–1	1–0	0–1	0–3
PAOK	1–1	4–1	1–1	4–2	2–1	1–1	3–1	3–2	1–3	2–0	1–0	1–1		3–1	2–2	4–1
Pierikos	1–0	4–0	2–1	5–2	1–0	0–1	1–1	0–1	3–1	0–1	0–1	1–0	4–1		0–0	5–1
Proodeftiki	1–3	1–0	0–0	1–3	1–2	5–0	1–0	2–4	2–3	2–1	3–3	0–0	1–1	2–4		4–1
Trikala	2–2	2–2	3–1	3–2	1–1	1–0	3–1	0–5	1–1	2–0	2–0	1–1	1–0	1–1	1–1	

Source: RSSSF
Legend: Blue = home team win; Yellow = draw; Red = away team win.

== Top scorers ==
Rank	Player	Club	Goals
1	(Greece) Mimis Papaioannou	AEK Athens	23
2	(Greece) Giorgos Sideris	Olympiacos	19
2	(Greece) Takis Loukanidis	Panathinaikos	19
4	(Greece) Aris Papazoglou	Olympiacos	18
5	(Greece) Stratos Sakellaridis	Panathinaikos	15
6	(Greece) Alekos Alexiadis	Aris	13
6	(Greece) Giorgos Koudas	PAOK	13
6	(Greece) Vangelis Panakis	Panathinaikos	13
6	(Greece) Kostas Papoutsakis	Panathinaikos	13
6	(Greece) Apostolos Panopoulos	Egaleo	13
6	(Greece) Onoufrios Charalampidis	PAOK	13

== Attendances ==
Olympiacos drew the highest average home attendance in the 1965–66 Alpha Ethniki.

#	Team	Average attendance
1	Olympiacos	27,770
2	Panathinaikos	15,510
3	AEK Athens	12,973
4	Ethnikos Piraeus	8,889
5	PAOK	7,807
6	Proodeftiki	6,524
7	Egaleo	5,665
8	Aris	5,577
9	Panserraikos	4,965
10	Iraklis	4,816
11	Apollon Athens	4,680
12	Trikala	4,612
13	Panionios	4,297
14	Niki Volos	2,783
15	Panegialios	1,950
16	Pierikos	1,857
