= 1964–65 Greek Football Cup =

1964–65 Greek Cup
Tournament details
- Country: Greece

Final positions
- Champions: Olympiacos (12th title)
- Runners-up: Panathinaikos

The 1964–65 Greek Football Cup was the 23rd edition of the Greek Football Cup. The competition culminated with the Greek Cup Final, held at Karaiskakis Stadium, on 14 July 1965. The match was contested by Olympiacos and Panathinaikos, with Olympiacos winning by 1–0.

== Calendar ==
From Round of 32 onwards:

Round	Date(s)	Fixtures	Clubs	New entries
Round of 32	4 April 1965	15	32 → 16	16
Round of 16	18 April 1965	8	16 → 8	none
Quarter-finals	2 July 1965	4	8 → 4	none
Semi-finals	July 1965	2	4 → 2	none
Final	14 July 1965	1	2 → 1	none

== Knockout phase ==
In the knockout phase, teams play against each other over a single match. If the match ends up as a draw, extra time will be played. If a winner doesn't occur after the extra time the winner emerges by a flip of a coin.
The mechanism of the draws for each round is as follows:

- In the draw for the round of 32, the teams that had qualified to previous' season Round of 16 are seeded and the clubs that passed the qualification round are unseeded.
- In the draws for the round of 16 onwards, there are no seedings, and teams from the same group can be drawn against each other.

== Bracket ==
Round of 32
Olympiacos	7
Olympiacos Volos	0
Pierikos	0
Vyzas Megara	1
AEK Athens	4
Athinaikos	0
PAOK	1
Atromitos	0
Ioannina	2
Panelefsiniakos	1
Niki Volos	1
Naoussa	0
Aris	2
Filippoi Kavala	1
Doxa Drama	2
Iraklis	0
Proodeftiki (w/o)	2
Diagoras	0
Panegialios (c)	2
Fostiras	2
Egaleo	4
Olympiacos Kozani	1
Panachaiki	1
Panionios (a.e.t.)	2
Apollon Athens	3
PAO Kalogreza	0
Irodotos	1
Ethnikos Piraeus (a.e.t.)	3
Nikiforos Florina	1
Apollon Kalamarias (c)	1
Panathinaikos (a.e.t.)	5
Lamia	1

Round of 16
Olympiacos	3
Vyzas Megara	0
AEK Athens	4
PAOK	0
Ioannina	1
Niki Volos (a.e.t.)	2
Aris	2
Doxa Drama	1
Proodeftiki	3
Panegialios	0
Egaleo	1
Panionios	0
Apollon Athens	1
Ethnikos Piraeus	0
Apollon Kalamarias	0
Panathinaikos	3

Quarter-finals
Olympiacos	3
AEK Athens	1
Niki Volos (a.e.t.)	2
Aris	1
Proodeftiki	3
Egaleo	2
Apollon Athens	1
Panathinaikos (c)	1

Semi-finals
Olympiacos	4
Niki Volos	0
Proodeftiki	0
Panathinaikos	1

Final
Olympiacos	1
Panathinaikos	0

== Round of 32 ==
Team 1	Score	Team 2
Niki Volos	1–0	Naoussa
Apollon Athens	3–0	PAO Kalogreza
Olympiacos	7–1	Olympiacos Volos
Aris	2–1	Filippoi Kavala
AEK Athens	4–0	Athinaikos
Egaleo	4–1	Olympiacos Kozani
Pierikos	0–1	Vyzas Megara
Ioannina	2–1	Panelefsiniakos
PAOK	1–0	Atromitos
Doxa Drama	2–0^{1}	Iraklis
Panachaiki	1–2 (a.e.t.)^{2}	Panionios
Panathinaikos	5–1 (a.e.t.)	Lamia
Irodotos	1–3 (a.e.t.)	Ethnikos Piraeus
Panegialios	2–2 (a.e.t.)^{3}	Fostiras
Nikiforos Florina	1–1 (a.e.t.)^{3}	Apollon Kalamarias
Proodeftiki	2–0 (w/o)	Diagoras

== Round of 16 ==
Team 1	Score	Team 2
Proodeftiki	3–0	Panegialios
AEK Athens	4–0	PAOK
Olympiacos	3–0	Vyzas Megara
Apollon Athens	1–0	Ethnikos Piraeus
Aris	2–1	Doxa Drama
Egaleo	1–0	Panionios
Apollon Kalamarias	0–3	Panathinaikos
Ioannina	1–2 (a.e.t.)	Niki Volos

== Quarter-finals ==
Team 1	Score	Team 2
Olympiacos	3–1	AEK Athens
Proodeftiki	3–2	Egaleo
Niki Volos	2–1 (a.e.t.)	Aris
Apollon Athens	1–1 (a.e.t.)^{3}	Panathinaikos

^{1}Suspended at 65th minute.

^{2}Suspended at 104th minute.

^{3}Coin toss.

== Semi-finals ==
Team 1	Score	Team 2
Proodeftiki	0–1	Panathinaikos
Olympiacos	4–0	Niki Volos

== Final ==
14 July 1965

Olympiacos	1–0	Panathinaikos
Sideris 5'	Report (page 3)

Karaiskakis Stadium, Piraeus
Attendance: 45,000
Referee: Fulvio Pieroni (Italy)
