= Michalis Simigdalas =

Greek footballer

Personal information
- Full name: Michail Simigdalas
- Date of birth: 23 June 1944 (age 82)
- Place of birth: Nea Filadelfeia, Athens, Greece
- Height: 1.71 m (5 ft 7 in)
- Positions: Midfielder; full-back

Youth career
- 1958–1963: AEK Athens

Senior career*
Years	Team	Apps	(Gls)
1963–1969	AEK Athens	17	(2)
1966	→ Alexander the Great (loan)	7	(1)
1969–1972	Apollon Athens	50	(6)
1972–1974	Panegialios		
1974–1975	Acharnaikos		
1975–1976	Athinaikos		
1976–1977	Ilioupoli		
1977–1978	Athinaikos		
- * Club domestic league appearances and goals

Michalis Simigdalas (Greek: Μιχάλης Σιμιγδαλάς; born 23 June 1944) is a Greek former professional footballer who played as midfielder.

== Club career ==
Simigdalas started playing football in 1958 at the academy departments of AEK Athens, under Georgios Daispangos. In 1963 he was promoted to the senior team. His coextistanse with prominent players in the roster did not allow him to establish himself in the main squad, however he played at the club for six seasons. On 15 July 1966 it was decided by the General Sport's Secretary and AEK to support the Greek-based Alexander the Great by providing them with four of their footballers until the end of the season in order for the club to stay in the Victorian State League. Those footballers were Simigdalas, Nikolaidis, Pomonis and Papageorgiou. Simigdalas played 7 matches and scored once and alongside his teammates at AEK he helped the club avoid relegation by finishing 10th. After the end of the season in September, they returned to AEK. Simigdalas was also a member of the squad that won second place in the Balkans Cup in 1967, losing in the final by Fenerbahçe. He was a regular in the team that reached the quarter-finals of the European Cup in 1969. During his spell at AEK, he won the Championship in 1968 season and two Cups.

In the summer of 1969, he left AEK and signed for Apollon Athens, where his older brother Nikos also played. On 31 July 1972, he was released from Apollon alongside his brother, due to disagreements with the manager, but also due to his disappointment by the behavior of a portion of the supporters towards him, while he had pending financial issues with the administration. He then moved to Panegialios. In the summer of 1974, he was transferred to Acharnaikos for a season. Afterwards, he played for Athinaikos and Ilioupoli for one season each, before returning to Athninaikos to end his career in 1978.

== Personal life ==
His brother, Nikos was also a footballer, who played mainly for Apollon Athens. There, they played together for a period, while Nikos was also his manager during their time at Ilioupoli.

Since the end of his career as a footballer, Simigdalas is constantly "close" to AEK Athens, while he also has a strong participation in their Veterans' Association. He has also served as the manager of the veteran team of AEK.

== Honours ==
AEK Athens

- Alpha Ethniki: 1967–68
- Greek Cup: 1963–64, 1965–66
