= Panagiotis Ventouris =

Greek footballer and manager (1943–2002)

- Panagiotis Ventouris with AEK Athens

Personal information
- Date of birth: 1 March 1943
- Place of birth: Tavros, Athens, Greece
- Date of death: 10 June 2002 (aged 59)
- Place of death: Tavros, Athens, Greece
- Positions: Midfielder; forward

Youth career
- 1955–1958: Fostiras

Senior career*
Years	Team	Apps	(Gls)
1958–1965	Fostiras	74^{[a]}	(20^{[a]})
1965–1972	AEK Athens	143	(35)
1965–1966	→ Hellenic (loan)		
1972–1973	Anorthosis Famagusta	13	(1)
1973–1974	Agioi Anargyroi		
Total		230	(56)

International career
1963	Greece	2	(0)

Managerial career
- 1974: Marko
- 1978–1979: Sourmena
- 1983: Fostiras
- 1986: Fostiras
- 1996: Fostiras
- * Club domestic league appearances and goals

Panagiotis Ventouris (Greek: Παναγιώτης Βεντούρης; 1 March 1943 – 10 June 2002) was a Greek professional footballer who played as a midfielder.

== Club career ==
=== Early years ===
Ventouris started his football career, when at the age of 12 signed a sports card at Fostiras, where in 1958 was promoted to the senior team. He was a member of the team that won the second division in their respective group and were promoted to the recently established first national division. Fostiras stayed for two seasons in the top and in 1963 was relegated again, but Ventouris had shown examples of his talent and his football value. On 13 August 1964, AEK Athens agreed terms with Fostiras for his transfer for a fee of 400,000 drachmas, with the deal becoming effective in the following summer.

=== AEK Athens ===
Despite being established in the squad, he was disappointed by the failure of the club's officials to fulfill their promise to secure him employment. Thus, on 29 December 1965, Ventouris left AEK and traveled to Cape Town to play at Hellenic, in the non-FIFA professional South African League. He spent a season playing in the National Football League. The new contacts and discussions with the administration of AEK, towards the end of the season, got him to return to Greece in 6 October 1966 and continue his career with the yellow-blacks.

Ventouris scored his first two goals with the club on 30 October in a 2–0 home win against Vyzas Megara. Ventouris had a major contribution in the club's campaign to the finals of the Balkans Cup in 1967, where they lost to Fenerbahçe. In the following season, he scored a brace in the institution, scoring the only goal of his team in the 2–1 away defeat against Spartak Sofia and in the 3–1 win against Fenerbahçe at home. In 1968 under the guidance of Jenő Csaknády, they won the championship, where he had a decisive contribution, as well as in the championship of 1971 under Branko Stanković. In his 7 appearances for the European Cup he scored 3 times, including a brace in the 3–2 away defeat against Jeunesse Esch on 2 October 1968, in a campaign that eventually reached the quarter-finals of the tournament and once on 29 September 1972 against Internazionale at home, equalizing the match before the final 3–2 win.

=== Later career ===
On 21 July 1972, Ventouris left AEK as a part of the renewal of the club's roster by Stanković and moved to Cyprus, where he signed for Anorthosis Famagusta. He played there for one season, before returning to Greece to play for the AFCA league side, Agioi Anargyroi, before retiring from football in 1974.

== International career ==
Ventouris made 2 appearances with Greece in 1963. On 14 April 1963, he played at a friendly match was held in Lisbon for Greece U21 against Portugal, but it proved to be a men's team, as players of 25 and 26 years old were competing.

He made his official debut on 27 November 1963, under his future manager at AEK, Tryfon Tzanetis and alongside his future teammate also at AEK, Mimis Papaioannou, who was the captain, in a friendly away 3–1 loss against Cyprus.

== Personal life ==
Ventouris worked at the PPC, while he was playing for AEK. He had a wife named Evgenia and two children named Antonis and Athanasia. He died on 10 June 2002, at the age of only 59, from heart attack and after suffering in his last years from health problems with rheumatoid arthritis.

== Honours ==
Fostiras

- Beta Ethniki: 1959–60 (Central Group)

AEK Athens

- Alpha Ethniki: 1967–68, 1970–71
- Greek Cup: 1965–66

== Notes ==
a. Includes only the first division stats.
