= Savvas Papazoglou =

Greek footballer

Personal information
- Full name: Savvas Papazoglou
- Date of birth: June 20, 1934 (age 92)
- Place of birth: Gazi, Athens, Greece
- Position: Forward

Youth career
- –1951: Dynamo Prosfigon Egaleo

Senior career*
Years	Team	Apps	(Gls)
1951–1953	Egaleo		
1953–1960	Apollon Athens	19	(4)
1960–1961	Panegialios	16	(7)
1961–1964	Olympiacos	19	(4)
1964–1965	Apollon Athens	15	(4)
1963–1964	Olympiacos Chalkida		
Total		69	(19)

International career
1957	Greece	5	(0)
- * Club domestic league appearances and goals

Savvas Papazoglou (Greek: Σάββας Παπάζογλου; born 20 June 1934) is a Greek former international football player who played as a forward.
