= Giorgos Kefalidis =

Greek footballer and manager (born 1941

Personal information
- Full name: Georgios Kefalidis
- Date of birth: 21 March 1941 (age 85)
- Place of birth: Katerini, Greece
- Height: 1.78 m (5 ft 10 in)
- Position: Defender

Senior career*
Years	Team	Apps	(Gls)
1959–1961	Megas Alexandros Katerini		
1961–1964	Pierikos		
1964–1972	AEK Athens	173	(3)
1972–1974	Atromitos	32^{[a]}	(0^{[a]})

International career
1960	Greece U19		
1963	Greece	2	(0)

Managerial career
- 1974–1975: PAO Thriamvos Athens
- 1979: AEK Athens (assistant)
- 1983: AEK Athens (assistant)
- 1983–1984: AEK Athens (assistant)
- 1985–1986: Vyzas Megara
- 1986–1987: Chalkida
- 1990–1991: AEK Athens Academy
- * Club domestic league appearances and goals

Giorgos Kefalidis (Greek: Γιώργος Κεφαλίδης; born 21 March 1941) is a Greek former professional footballer who played as defender and a former manager. His nickname was "Ruby" as of Jack Ruby, the killer of Lee Harvey Oswald, who assassined John F. Kennedy.

== Club career ==
Kefalidis started his career in his hometown club, Mega Alexandros Katerini, before merging with Olympos Katerini in 1961 and founded Pierikos, competing in the second division. He made excellent performances with the club of Katerini and helped them win promotion to the first division in 1962, while he also became an international. In the following season he was one of the key players of the squad that reached the final of the Cup, where they lost 3–0 to Olympiacos. On 16 October 1963, AEK Athens agreed terms with Pierikos for his transfer for a fee of 800,000 drachmas, with the deal becoming effective in the following summer.

At AEK, Kefalidis was quickly established as a member of the main squad, playing mainly at the right side of the defense, but also as a central defender. On 2 July 1965, he scored in a 3–1 defeat against Olympiacos at Karaiskakis Stadium, for the quarter-final of the Cup, which left out of the tournament. A key member of the team that won second place in the Balkans Cup in 1967, losing only in the final by Fenerbahçe. He was also one of the main players in the squad that reached the quarter-finals of the European Cup in 1969. He remained at AEK for almost a decade, winning two championships and a Cup in 1966. In August 1972, as a part of the renewal of the club's roster by the manager Branko Stanković, he was among the players that were released, and signed for Atromitos. There, he played until 1974, when he retired as a footballer.

== International career ==
Kefalidis made 2 appearances with Greece in 1963. On 14 April 1963, he played at a friendly match was held in Lisbon for Greece U21 against Portugal, but it proved to be a men's team, as players of 25 and 26 years old were competing. He made his official debut alongside his future teammate at AEK, Mimis Papaioannou who played as the captain of Greece, on 27 November 1963 in a friendly away 3–1 loss against Cyprus, under his also future manager at AEK, Tryfon Tzanetis.

== After football ==
After his playing career was over, Kefalidis enacted with coaching starting from PAO Thriamvos Athens in 1974. He helped AEK Athens in various roles during the 70s and 80s, especially in the infrastructuredepartments. He was the assistant of Andreas Stamatiadis, when he took charge of the management in 1979, as well as the assistant of Helmut Senekowitsch in both of his spells at the bench of AEK Athens. In the early 1990s, he also worked as a staff member of Greece U21.

== Personal life ==
Kefalidis is an active member of the Veterans Association of AEK Athens.

He was married to Anna, until her death in July 2020. They have two children named Rika and Dimitris.

== Honours ==
Pierikos

- Beta Ethniki: 1961–62 (Group C)

AEK Athens

- Alpha Ethniki: 1967–68, 1970–71
- Greek Cup: 1965–66

== Notes ==
a. Includes only the first division stats.
