= Vangelis Petrakis =

Greek footballer (1938–2026)

- Petrakis with AEK Athens

Personal information
- Full name: Evangelos Petrakis
- Date of birth: 7 September 1938
- Place of birth: Sindos, Thessaloniki, Greece
- Date of death: 3 February 2026 (aged 87)
- Place of death: Heraklion, Greece
- Position: Goalkeeper

Youth career
- 1953–1957: Aris Ptolemaida

Senior career*
Years	Team	Apps	(Gls)
1957–1962	Aris	92	(0)
1962–1967	AEK Athens	42	(0)
1967–1971	OFI	36	(0)
Total		170	(0)

International career
1961–1966	Greece military	22	(0)
Medal record
Men's football
Representing Greece
World Military Cup
Winner	1962
Winner	1963
- * Club domestic league appearances and goals

Vangelis Petrakis (Greek: Βαγγέλης Πετράκης; 7 September 1938 – 3 February 2026) was a Greek footballer who played as a goalkeeper.

== Club career ==
Petrakis started his football career in 1953 at Aris Ptolemaida. In the summer of 1957, he took the first big step of his career, as he transferred to Aris. With the "yellows" he won the Macedonia FCA Championship in 1959, while finishing sixth place in the Panhellenic Championship. He replaced Dimitris Akparidis under the posts of Aris and in the first year of the first national division, he was a key member of the team's squad. On 22 January 1962, he was blamed for a 5–2 loss to Panathinaikos, with his teammates and club officials asking him to take off his shirt and leave during the match. The team management found him guilty of deliberately underperforming and punished him with a ban from the club's activities for the next few months. He returned in the away match against Panathinaikos on 10 June 1962, where with an amazing performance he kept a clean sheet, even saving a penalty, gave the team of Thessaloniki a 1–0 win.

In the summer of 1962, he was transferred to AEK, where he played for five years, but in the shadow of Stelios Serafidis. He was involved in some of the team's heaviest defeats, including the away 7–2 by Monaco for the European Cup, which was the first match in the UEFA competitions the 5–4 by Panathinaikos and the 4–0 by Olympiacos. During his spell at AEK, he won a league title in 1963 and two Cups. In 1967, he was transferred to OFI, where he played for four seasons, having managed to celebrate the promotion to the first division in 1968 and to compete in it with the team from Heraklion for the next three years, until his retirement from football in 1971.

== International career ==
Petrakis was the main goalkeeper of the then Greece military team, where he made 22 appearances and was a key and irreplaceable member of the team that won the World Military Cup in 1962 and 1963.

== Death ==
Petrakis died on 3 February 2026, at the age of 87.

== Honours ==
Aris

- Macedonia FCA Championship: 1959

AEK Athens

- Alpha Ethniki: 1962–63
- Greek Cup: 1963–64, 1965–66

Greece military

- World Military Cup: 1962, 1963
