= Aleko Yordan =

Turkish footballer and manager (1938–2019)

- Alekos Iordanou with AEK Athens.

Personal information
- Full name: Alekos Iordanou
- Date of birth: 10 January 1938
- Place of birth: Istanbul, Turkey
- Date of death: 21 September 2019 (aged 81)
- Place of death: Kirra, Phocis, Greece
- Height: 1.79 m (5 ft 10 in)
- Position: Centre-back

Youth career
- 1952–1956: Prasina Poulia

Senior career*
| Years | Team | Apps | (Gls) |
| 1956–1959 | Beyoğlu | 16 | (0) |
| 1959–1964 | Beykoz | 124 | (19) |
| 1964–1969 | AEK Athens | 80 | (3) |
| 1969–1971 | Egaleo | 58 | (0) |
| 1971–1972 | Koropi | | |
| Total | | 278 | (22) |

International career^{‡}
| 1962 | Turkey | 2 | (0) |
| 1962 | Turkey B | 1 | (0) |

Managerial career
- 1972–1977: Fokikos (player-manager)
- 1981–1982: Fokikos
- 1983–1985: Asteras Itea (player-manager)
- * Club domestic league appearances and goals as of 26 August 2022 ‡ National team caps and goals as of 22 January 2018

Aleko Yordan (born Alekos Iordanou; Greek: Αλέκος Ιορδάνου; 10 January 1938 – 21 September 2019) was a Turkish professional footballer who played as a centre-back and later a manager.

== Club career ==
Yordan from a young age showed his football talent playing at Prasina Poulia, where he was noticed by a former AEK Athens player, Kleanthis Maropoulos, who had also played in the Messinian club. At the age of 17, he moved to Turkey to play for Beyoğlu (also known as Pera Club), where for three years had good performances, that attracted the interest of Beykoz, who were in the top positions of the league. In 1959, he subsequently signed a professional contract with Beykoz in the newly founded Turkish Süper Lig. His performances with the club and the Turks intention to prevent him from playing for Greece, resulted in his call from Turkey at the age of 18. He played at Beykoz for three seasons, until he was offered to return to Greece and play for AEK Athens, who were the continuation of Pera Club for the old Constantinopolitans. At the same time, he also had offers from Fenerbahçe and Galatasaray, but his desire was play for the yellow-blacks of Greece.

On 26 July 1963, Yordan arrived in Athens in order to sign for AEK. However, the transfer was blocked by the HFF, as it was forbidden for a professional footballer to compete in the first division. Thus, he was forced to wait for the appeals and legal disputes to end. It was once again Maropoulos, who had become an official of AEK and did everything possible in order for Yordan to move to the Greek club. Eventually, on 16 February 1964, Beykoz granted him a free transfer to AEK which was finalized on 26 April, as he to complete a full 9-month stay in the country. Until he officially join the club, he competed only in friendly matches with AEK.

He adapted immediately, establishing himself in the main squad. In his first season at the club, AEK won the Cup. His performances attracted the interest of Bayern Munich, who made an offer to AEK in signing him. AEK rejected the Germans twice, having exorbitant demands for selling their player. Offers by Beşiktaş in 1965 were rejected, as well. Yordan was a member of the squad that reached the Balkans Cup final in 1967, losing the trophy to Fenerbahçe. In 1968, he again refused a transfer to Beşiktaş, since did not want to return to Turkey and despite being 30 years old, he wanted to continue playing for AEK. He was one of the club's key players when they reached the quarter-finals of the European Cup in 1969. During his spell at the club he won one championship and two Greek Cups.

In the summer of 1969, the administration of the club granted him a free transfer, since the manager, Branko Stanković, was making a renewall in the squad. Thus, Yordan left AEK and signed for Egaleo. During his spell at the club they made an impresive fourth place finish in the 1970–71 league. On 30 July 1971, he was released from the club and on 16 August he signed for Koropi, where he played for a season. He ended his career competing in the lower divisions of Greece, with the complaint that he was not called to play for Greece.

== International career ==
At the age of 18 Yordan became an international with Turkey, where he played 3 times, despite the hostile atmosphere from his teammates. However, the manager, Sandro Puppo ignored the whole situation and wanted the Greek players such as him and Lefter Küçükandonyadis in the national team at all costs.

== Managerial career ==
Yordan took over as player-manager of Fokikos, where he won three local Cups. He then took over as manager of Asteras Itea, where he had settled permanently, even after the end of his football career.

== Personal life ==
After Yordan retired from football, he lived in Itea, Phocis with his family. He had a son named Diamantis, who was also a footballer. On 21 September 2019, he died after a long battle with cancer.

== Honours ==
=== Player ===
AEK Athens

- Alpha Ethniki: 1967–68
- Greek Cup: 1955–56, 1963–64, 1965–66

=== Manager ===
Fokikos

- Phthiotis FCA League: 1973–74, 1975–76
- Phthiotis FCA Cup: 1974–75, 1975–76, 1976–77
