= Pavlos Vasiliou =

Cypriot-Greek footballer

Personal information
- Date of birth: 28 December 1940 (age 85)
- Place of birth: Larnaca, Cyprus
- Position: Midfielder

Youth career
- EPA Larnaca

Senior career*
Years	Team	Apps	(Gls)
–1963	EPA Larnaca		
1963–1970	Olympiacos	194	(50)
1970–1973	EPA Larnaca	28+	(3+)

International career
1964–1967	Greece	7	(0)
1970–1972	Cyprus	8	(0)
- * Club domestic league appearances and goals

Pavlos Vasiliou (Greek: Παύλος Βασιλείου; born 28 December 1940) is a Cypriot-Greek former footballer who played as a midfielder and appeared for both the Greece and Cyprus national teams.

== Career ==
Vasiliou made his international debut for the Greece national team on 29 November 1964 in a 1966 World Cup qualifying match against Denmark, which finished as a 4–2 win in Athens. He made seven appearances in total for the team, earning his final cap for Greece on 8 March 1967 in a friendly against Romania, which finished as a 1–2 loss in Athens. He later represented his native Cyprus, making his first appearance on 15 November 1970 in a UEFA Euro 1972 qualifying match against the Soviet Union, which finished as a 1–3 loss in Nicosia. He was capped eight times for Cyprus, making his final appearance on 10 May 1972 in a 1974 World Cup qualifying match against Portugal, which finished as a 0–1 loss in Nicosia.

== Career statistics ==
=== International ===
Team	Year	Apps	Goals
Greece	1964	2	0
Greece	1965	3	0
Greece	1967	2	0
Greece	Total	7	0
Cyprus	1970	1	0
Cyprus	1971	5	0
Cyprus	1972	2	0
Cyprus	Total	8	0
Career total		15	0
