= Takis Loukanidis =

Greek footballer

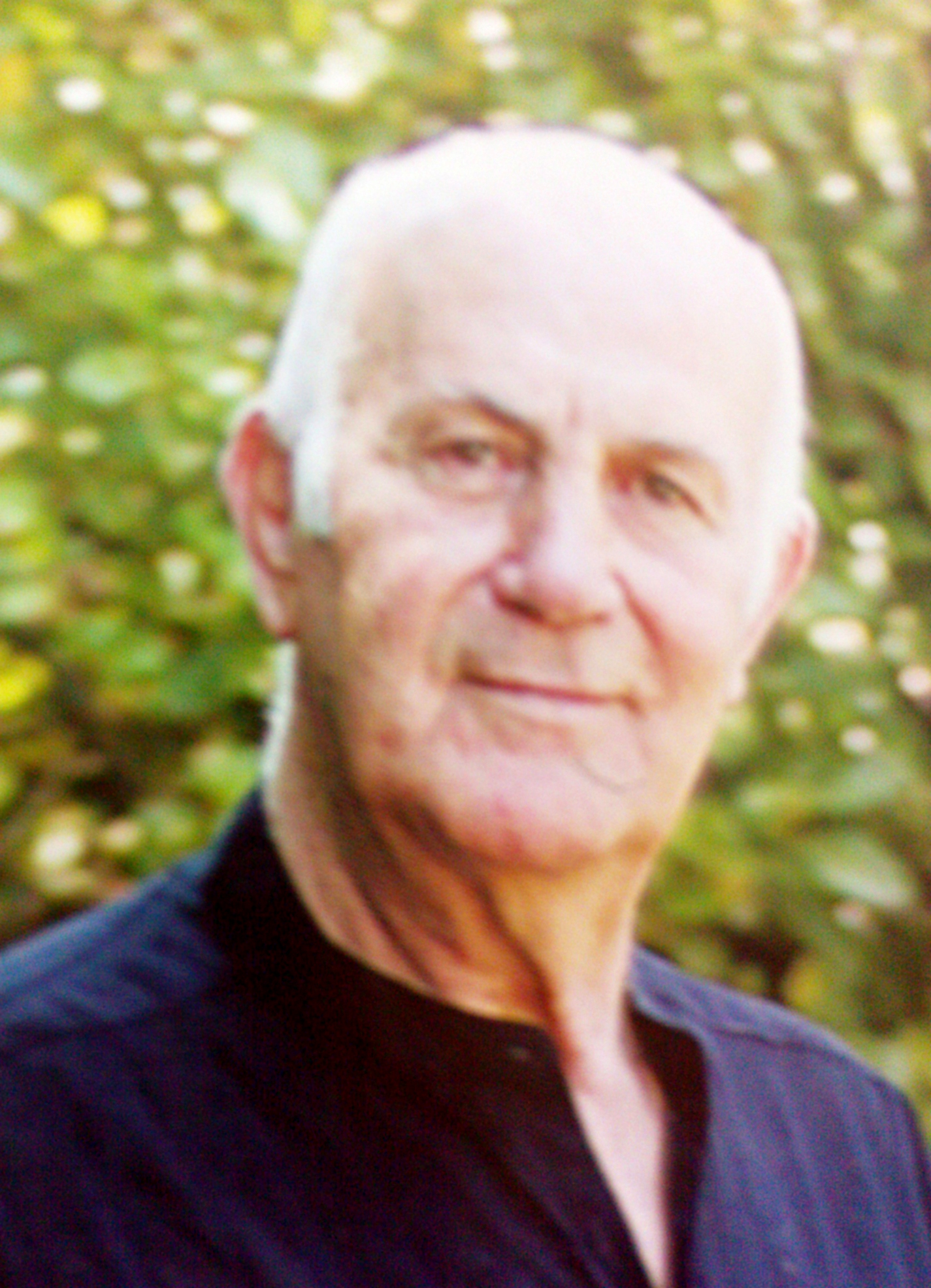
- Loukanidis in 2009

Personal information
- Full name: Panagiotis Loukanidis
- Date of birth: 25 September 1937
- Place of birth: Paranesti, Greece
- Date of death: 11 January 2018 (aged 80)
- Place of death: Athens, Greece
- Position: Midfielder

Youth career
- 1953–1956: M.G.C. Α.Ε. Κomotini

Senior career*
Years	Team	Apps	(Gls)
1956–1961	Doxa Dramas	50	(13)
1961–1969	Panathinaikos	142	(59)
1969–1971	Aris	45	(8)
Total		237	(80)

International career
1958–1967	Greece	23	(3)
1960	Greece Olympic	4	(0)

Managerial career
- 1971–1972: Ikaros Athens
- 1991: Panserraikos
- * Club domestic league appearances and goals

Takis Loukanidis (Greek: Τάκης Λουκανίδης, 25 September 1937 – 11 January 2018) was a Greek footballer of the 1950s–60s.

== Club career ==
Born in Paranesti, a village in the broader area of Drama, Loukanidis' father was killed by Bulgarian armed forces and soon after he was placed in an orphanage at age 10. He began playing football with the youth side of AEK Komotini, and joined the senior team of Doxa Drama F.C. in 1955.

He soon attracted the interest of major clubs in Greece and abroad, including Juventus Finally, Antonis Mantzevelakis brought him to Panathinaikos via APOEL in Cyprus. Loukanidis made his debut on 28 March 1962 against AEK Athens that ended in a home 3–2 defeat. In the following match, on 1 April 1962, he scored his first goal with Panathinaikos, helping them defeat Proodeftiki 5–0. He ended his career at Aris, where he won the Greek Cup in 1970.

== International career ==
Loukanidis made 23 appearances and scored three goals for the Greece national team from 1958 to 1967. He made his debut in a 1–7 defeat of 1960 European Nations' Cup qualifying to France on 1 October 1958.

== Managerial career ==
Immediately after his retirement Loukainids took charge of the second division side Ikaros Athens, where they lost the promotion to Kalamata in a play-off match at the end of his first season.

== Death ==
Loukanidis died on 11 January 2018 in Athens due to a myocardial infarction. He was 80. Panathinaikos released a statement on their official website, paying tribute:

It is a sad day for the Panathinaikos family, as Takis (Neotakis) Loukanidis, one of the club’s legendary figures, passed away in his 81st year. Takis Loukanidis, perhaps one of Greece’s leading footballers of all time, remains a symbol for the history of Panathinaikos and Greek football in general. In his great career, alongside Panathinaikos, Loukanidis wore the shirt of Doxa Dramas and Aris Thessaloniki and of course the national team. Loukanidis won the respect and recognition of both players and fans.

== Honours ==
Panathinaikos

- Alpha Ethniki: 1961–62, 1963–64, 1964–65, 1968–69
- Greek Cup: 1966–67, 1968–69

Aris

- Greek Cup: 1969–70
