= Giorgos Sideris =

Greek footballer

Personal information
- Full name: Georgios Sideris
- Date of birth: 5 April 1938 (age 88)
- Place of birth: Agios Ioannis Rentis, Piraeus, Greece
- Height: 1.74 m (5 ft 9 in)
- Position: Striker

Youth career
- 1953–1958: Atromitos Piraeus

Senior career*
Years	Team	Apps	(Gls)
1958–1959	Atromitos Piraeus	30	(28)
1959–1970	Olympiacos	283	(222)
1970–1971	Royal Antwerp	25	(7)
1971–1972	Olympiacos	2	(2)
Total		340	(259)

International career
1958–1970	Greece	28	(14)
- * Club domestic league appearances and goals

Giorgos Sideris (Greek: Γιώργος Σιδέρης; born 5 April 1938) is a Greek former footballer, who played as striker.

== Club career ==
Sideris began his youth career at Atromitos Piraeus playing in the centre of midfield but his coaches soon became aware of his goalscoring capabilities. When he was promoted to the senior team in 1958 he produced an outstanding debut season in which Sideris became the fulcrum of Atromitos’ attack. The youngsters direct, no-holding-back attacking style plundered 28 goals in 30 league appearances

Sideris transferred to Olympiacos in the summer of 1959. Despite having his heart set on a move to Panathinaikos, a friend of his, Savvas Theodoridis, had ushered him towards Olympiacos, fresh off winning their sixth consecutive league title. Olympiacos were keen to continue their domestic dominance, and, despite the aforementioned resistance to the move, the Atromitos president had received an offer too good to refuse and forced the move. The youngster reluctantly joined the red and whites and in return, five Olympiacos players went to Atromitos.

Despite his averseness, Sideris kicked off the newly-formed Alpha Ethniki league with Olympiacos. But by all accounts, he had an underwhelming debut season. The Greek outfit also faced AC Milan in the preliminary rounds of the European Cup and, despite holding Milan to a 2–2 draw in the first leg — where Sideris was given his European debut by manager Bruno Vale — they exited the competition after a 3–1 defeat in the second leg.

He went on to score 225 goals for his club, placing him at the top of Olympiacos' all-time scorers' table. Three times he was the top scorer in the Greek First Division. He became leading scorer three times in the Greek championship with: 29 goals in 1965, 22 goals in 1967. In 1970, he transferred to Belgium's Royal Antwerp after having finished second to Bulgaria's Petar Zhekov of CSKA Sofia (36), for the European Golden Boot competition in 1969, scoring 35 goals in that season. On 6 February 1972, Giorgos Sideris rejoins Olympiakos (in a match against Panachaiki, 3–2) after his return from Belgium where he played for Antwerp (1971). He was the first Greek player to play for another European team outside Greece. On 20 February 1972 he played his last game against Panathinaikos at Karaiskakis Stadium. Sideris was also one of the key offensive players of the Greece national team.

== International career ==
Sideris was capped 28 times (including once while a player with Atromitos), he scored 14 goals.

== After football ==
After his football career ended, Sideris established a successful insurance company.

== Honours ==
Olympiacos

- Alpha Ethniki: 1965–66, 1966–67
- Greek Cup: 1959–60, 1960–61, 1962–63, 1964–65, 1967–68
- Greater Greece Cup: 1969, 1972

=== Individual ===
- European Golden Shoe: 1968–69 2nd place
- Alpha Ethniki Top goalscorer: 1964–65, 1966–67, 1968–69
