= Aris Papazoglou =

Greek footballer (1938–1969)

Personal information
- Full name: Aristidis Papazoglou
- Date of birth: 30 November 1938
- Date of death: 13 August 1969 (aged 30)
- Position: Forward

Senior career*
Years	Team	Apps	(Gls)
1957–1967	Olympiacos	132	(71)

International career
1964–1965	Greece	2	(2)
- * Club domestic league appearances and goals

Aris Papazoglou (Greek: Άρης Παπάζογλου; 30 November 1938 – 13 August 1969) was a Greek football striker.

== Honours ==
Olympiacos

- Panhellenic Championship/Alpha Ethniki: 1958, 1959, 1966, 1967
- Greek Cup: 1958, 1959, 1960, 1961, 1963 και 1965
