= 1965–66 Greek Football Cup =

1965–66 Greek Cup
Tournament details
- Country: Greece

Final positions
- Champions: AEK Athens (7th title)
- Runners-up: Olympiacos

The 1965–66 Greek Football Cup was the 24th edition of the Greek Football Cup.

For the second time in three editions, the Cup final was scratched: AEK Athens were awarded the Cup as the HFF was late to determine a date for the match. Due to Olympiacos having to prepare for the next season's European Cup, the delay meant that Olympiacos would not be able to field a team for the final.

== Calendar ==
From Round of 32 onwards:

Round	Date(s)	Fixtures	Clubs	New entries
Round of 32	6 January 1966	15	32 → 16	16
Round of 16	11 May 1966	8	16 → 8	none
Quarter-finals	26 June 1966	4	8 → 4	none
Semi-finals	7 July 1966	1	4 → 2	none
Final	10 July 1966	0	2 → 1	none

== Knockout phase ==
In the knockout phase, teams play against each other over a single match. If the match ends up as a draw, extra time will be played. If a winner doesn't occur after the extra time the winner emerges by a flip of a coin.
The mechanism of the draws for each round is as follows:

- In the draw for the round of 32, the teams that had qualified to previous' season Round of 16 are seeded and the clubs that passed the qualification round are unseeded.
- In the draws for the round of 16 onwards, there are no seedings, and teams from the same group can be drawn against each other.

== Bracket ==
Round of 32
Panathinaikos (a.e.t.)	5
Doxa Drama	2
Apollon Athens (w/o)	2
Lamia	0
Chania	2
Panegialios	0
Olympiacos	3
Diagoras	0
Trikala	3
Petralona	2
Panionios	2
Fostiras	1
PAOK	0
Ethnikos Pylaia (c)	0
Panachaiki	3
Korinthos	1
Apollon Kalamarias	1
PAO Dioikitirio	0
AEK Athens	4
Edessaikos	3
Ethnikos Piraeus	3
Vyzas Megara	2
Niki Volos	1
Foinikas Polichni	2
Kavala	1
Aris	0
Egaleo	3
Chalandri (c)	3
Atromitos Piraeus (c)	2
Asteras Zografou	2
Ioannina	2
Proodeftiki	3

Round of 16
Panathinaikos	3
Apollon Athens	0
Chania	1
Olympiacos	3
Trikala (c)	1
Panionios	1
Ethnikos Pylaia (c)	0
Panachaiki	0
Apollon Kalamarias	0
AEK Athens	1
Ethnikos Piraeus	4
Foinikas Polichni	1
Kavala	3
Chalandri	1
Atromitos Piraeus	2
Proodeftiki	4

Quarter-finals
Panathinaikos	1
Olympiacos	2
Trikala	7
Ethnikos Pylaia	0
AEK Athens	4
Ethnikos Piraeus	1
Kavala	4
Proodeftiki	1

Semi-finals
Olympiacos	5
Trikala	0
AEK Athens (w/o)	2
Kavala	0

Final
Olympiacos	0
AEK Athens (w/o)	2

== Round of 32 ==
Team 1	Score	Team 2
Panionios	2–1	Fostiras
Ethnikos Piraeus	3–2	Vyzas Megara
Olympiacos	3–0	Diagoras
Ioannina	2–3	Proodeftiki
AEK Athens	4–3	Edessaikos
Trikala	3–2	Petralona
Panachaiki	3–1	Korinthos
Chania	2–0	Panegialios
Apollon Kalamarias	1–0	PAO Dioikitirio
Niki Volos	1–2	Foinikas Polichni
Kavala	1–0	Aris
Panathinaikos	5–2 (a.e.t.)	Doxa Drama
Atromitos Piraeus	2–2 (a.e.t.)^{*}	Asteras Zografou
Egaleo	3–3 (a.e.t.)^{*}	Chalandri
PAOK	0–0 (a.e.t.)^{*}	Ethnikos Pylaia
Apollon Athens	2–0 (w/o)	Lamia

^{*}Coin toss.

== Round of 16 ==
Team 1	Score	Team 2
Ethnikos Piraeus	4–1	Foinikas Polichni
Kavala	3–1	Chalandri
Chania	1–3	Olympiacos
Panathinaikos	3–0	Apollon Athens
Apollon Kalamarias	0–1	AEK Athens
Atromitos Piraeus	2–4	Proodeftiki
Ethnikos Pylaia	0–0^{*}	Panachaiki
Trikala	1–1^{*}	Panionios

^{*}Coin toss.

== Quarter-finals ==
Team 1	Score	Team 2
Panathinaikos	1–2	Olympiacos
AEK Athens	4–1	Ethnikos Piraeus
Kavala	4–1	Proodeftiki
Trikala	7–0	Ethnikos Pylaia

== Semi-finals ==
Team 1	Score	Team 2
Olympiacos	5–0	Trikala
AEK Athens	2–0 (w/o)^{*}	Kavala

^{*}Kavala did not show up, claiming that the match should be played in their home ground. According to relative regulation, the HFF, even though they set the match at Kaftanzoglio Stadium in Thessaloniki, did not accept Kavala's claim and awarded the match to AEK Athens 2–0.

== Final ==
The late scheduling of the match by the HFF resulted in Olympiacos not being able to show-up, due to their preparation for the next season's European Cup. Thus, the final was scratched and AEK Athens were awarded the Cup.
