= 1973–74 AEK Athens F.C. season =

AEK Athens
1973–74 season
- Chairman: Ioannis Theodorakopoulos (until 8 March); Loukas Barlos
- Manager: Stan Anderson (until 17 April); Kostas Chatzimichail
- Stadium: AEK Stadium
- Alpha Ethniki: 5th
- Greek Cup: Round of 16
- Top goalscorer: League: Tasos Konstantinou (14); All: Tasos Konstantinou (14)
- Highest home attendance: 30,000 vs Olympiacos (9 December 1973); 30,000 vs Egaleo (23 September 1973)
- Lowest home attendance: 8,094 vs Kavala (5 June 1974)
- Average home league attendance: 17,837
- Biggest win: AEK Athens 4–0 Egaleo
- Biggest defeat: Olympiacos 4–0 AEK Athens
Home colours	Away colours

The 1973–74 season was the 50th season in the existence of AEK Athens F.C. and the 15th consecutive season in the top flight of Greek football. They competed in the Alpha Ethniki and the Greek Cup. The season began on 23 September 1973 and finished on 19 June 1974.

== Kits ==
Home	Away

== Overview ==
Another disappointing season for AEK Athens. The combination of administrative changes and financial difficulties left AEK out of claiming titles and distinctions for another year, while the equally bad previous season had left the club out of European competitions. In the administration, the political regime proposed to the businessman, Loukas Barlos, the assignment of the presidency of AEK. He refused as he did not agree with the method of assignment and Ioannis Theodorakopoulos taking over. In addition, after the dismissal of Branko Stanković from AEK during the last season the management ended up in appointing the a former English international midfielder, Stan Anderson as his replacement, with his only managerial spell being at Middlesbrough. The important signings of the season were Giorgos Sidiropoulos, Sakis Zarzopoulos, Spyros Stefanidis and Lazaros Papadopoulos, while Stelios Konstantinidis, Rizos Lellis, Kostas Nikolaidis, Spyros Pomonis and Giannis Dandelis left the club.

AEK were having a bad campaign throughout the season, being away from the leading places of the table and were unable to overturn the situation. The administrativde changes with the election of Barlos as president in April and the 4–0 away defeat to Olympiacos, led to the firing of Anderson a few days later, leaving AEK in sixth place. His assistant Kostas Chatzimichail stepped up to end the season as an interim manager. All AEK could eventually do was a fifth place finish for the second consecutive year, at a distance of 19 points from the top.

In the Cup AEK eliminated Olympiakos Neon Liosion by 3–0 and Atromitos on penalties in the first round and the round of 32, respectively. At the round of 16 faced PAOK and were eliminated with a 3–1 defeat at the Toumba Stadium, with the club of Thessaloniki eventually winning the title.

== Management team ==
Position	Staff
Manager	(Greece) Kostas Chatzimichail
Goalkeeping coach	(Greece) Stelios Serafidis
Academy manager	(Greece) Kostas Chatzimichail

== Players ==
=== Squad information ===
NOTE: The players are the ones that have been announced by the AEK Athens' press release. No edits should be made unless a player arrival or exit is announced. Updated 19 June 1974, 23:59 UTC+2.

Player	Nat.	Position(s)	Date of birth (Age)	Signed	Previous club	Transfer fee	Contract until
Goalkeepers
Néstor Errea	(Argentina)	GK	27 April 1939 (aged 35)	1972	(Argentina) Banfield	Free	1975
Giorgos Sidiropoulos	(Greece)	GK	25 June 1949 (aged 25)	1973	(Greece) Trikala	₯1,800,000	1981
Lakis Stergioudas	(Greece)	GK	11 December 1952 (aged 21)	1972	(Greece) Niki Polygyros	₯36,000	1981
Defenders
Spyros Stefanidis	(Greece)	CB / RB	18 December 1946 (aged 27)	1973	(Greece) Panserraikos	₯500,000	1981
Giorgos Tanidis	(Greece)	CB	25 December 1946 (aged 27)	1971	(Greece) Aris Ptolemaida	₯120,000	1979
Apostolos Toskas	(Greece)	CB	28 December 1947 (aged 26)	1969	(Greece) Trikala	₯1,500,000	1977
Sakis Zarzopoulos	(Greece)	CB / DM / RB / LB	15 December 1949 (aged 24)	1973	(Greece) Panserraikos	₯2,500,000	1981
Stefanos Theodoridis	(Greece)	RB / LB / CB / RM / LM	19 June 1950 (aged 24)	1969	(Greece) AEK Athens U20	—	1977
Nikos Karoulias	(Greece)	LB / LM / AM	25 May 1953 (aged 21)	1973	(Greece) AEK Athens U20	—	1981
Giorgos Kontopoulos	(Greece)	LB / CB	1954 (aged 19–20)	1973	(Greece) AEK Athens U20	—	1981
Petros Ravousis	(Greece)	CB / RB	1 October 1954 (aged 19)	1972	(Greece) Aetos Skydra	Free	1981
Midfielders
Nikos Stathopoulos (Vice-captain)	(Greece)	LM / LB / CM	8 November 1943 (aged 30)	1966	(Greece) AEK Athens U20	—	1976
Giorgos Karafeskos	(Greece)	CM / DM / RM / RW	8 December 1946 (aged 27)	1965	(Greece) AEK Athens U20	—	1976
Giorgos Lavaridis	(Greece)	CM / DM / CB	15 October 1947 (aged 26)	1968	(Greece) AEK Athens U20	—	1976
Lazaros Papadopoulos	(Greece)	RM / RB / LM / LB / RW / LW	3 January 1950 (aged 24)	1973	(Greece) Veria	₯1,300,000	1981
Dionysis Tsamis	(Greece)	CM / DM / AM	17 October 1951 (aged 22)	1972	(Greece) Panetolikos	₯2,350,000	1981
Vangelis Makos	(Greece)	LM / LW	18 January 1952 (aged 22)	1972	(Greece) Thriamvos Athens	Free	1980
Forwards
Mimis Papaioannou (Captain)	(Greece)	SS / ST / AM / RW	17 November 1942 (aged 31)	1962	(Greece) Veria	₯175,000	1976
Takis Karachisaridis	(Greece)	ST	1947 (aged 26–27)	1973	(Greece) Makedonikos	Free	1981
Babis Psimogiannos	(Greece)	ST	13 August 1947 (aged 26)	1971	(Greece) Aris Agios Konstantinos	Free	1979
Lakis Nikolaou	(Greece)	ST / RW / CB / RB	17 July 1949 (aged 24)	1971	(Greece) Atromitos	₯600,000	1979
Tasos Konstantinou	(Cyprus)	RW / SS / ST / RM / AM	11 March 1951 (aged 23)	1972	(Cyprus) EPA Larnaca	₯600,000	1980
Jorge Falero Fanìs	(Uruguay) (Greece)	ST	August 1952 (aged 21)	1973	(Uruguay) Danubio	₯750,000	1975
Kostas Panagiotopoulos	(Greece)	RW / RM	3 September 1953 (aged 20)	1973	(Greece) Moudania	₯300,000	1981
Ivan Kypritidis	(Greece) (Soviet Union)	RW / ST / RM / AM	7 May 1954 (aged 20)	1973	(Greece) Asteras Zografou	Free	1981
Stefanos Karypidis	(Greece)	RW / ST / RM	1955 (aged 18–19)	1972	(Greece) AEK Athens U20	—	1981

== Transfers ==
=== In ===
Pos.	Player	From	Fee	Date	Contract Until	Source
GK	(Greece) Giorgos Sidiropoulos	(Greece) Trikala	₯1,800,000	24 July 1973	30 June 1981	
DF	(Greece) Sakis Zarzopoulos	(Greece) Panserraikos	₯2,500,000	17 July 1973	30 June 1981	
DF	(Greece) Spyros Stefanidis	(Greece) Panserraikos	₯500,000	17 July 1973	30 June 1981	
DF	(Greece) Nikos Karoulias	(Greece) AEK Athens U20	Promotion	1 July 1973	30 June 1981	
DF	(Greece) Giorgos Kontopoulos	(Greece) AEK Athens U20	Promotion	1 July 1973	30 June 1981	
MF	(Greece) Lazaros Papadopoulos	(Greece) Veria	₯1,300,000	31 August 1973	30 June 1981	
FW	(Greece) Giorgos Kachris	(Greece) Atromitos	Loan return	1 July 1973	30 June 1977	
FW	(Greece) Kostas Panagiotopoulos	(Greece) Moudania	₯300,000	18 July 1973	30 June 1981	
FW	(Greece) Ivan Kypritidis	(Greece) Asteras Zografou	Free transfer	3 July 1973	30 June 1981	
FW	(Greece) Kostas Chanios	(Greece) Atromitos	Loan return	1 July 1973	30 June 1977	
FW	(Greece) Takis Karachisaridis	(Greece) Makedonikos	Free transfer	31 July 1973	30 June 1981	
FW	(Uruguay) Jorge Falero Fanìs	(Uruguay) Danubio	₯750,000	31 July 1973	30 June 1975	

=== Out ===
Pos.	Player	To	Fee	Date	Source
GK	(Greece) Stelios Konstantinidis	(Greece) Atromitos	Contract termination	10 August 1973	
DF	(Greece) Rizos Lellis	(Greece) AEL	Contract termination	31 August 1973	
DF	(Greece) Kostas Triantafyllou	(Greece) AEK Athens U20	Demotion	31 July 1973	
DF	(Greece) Lefteris Istorios	(Greece) Atromitos	Contract termination	14 August 1973	
DF	(Greece) Nikos Karapoulitidis	(Greece) AEK Athens U20	Demotion	31 July 1973	
MF	(Argentina) Hugo Horacio Zerr	(Argentina) Lanús	Contract termination	31 July 1973	
FW	(Greece) Kostas Nikolaidis	(Greece) PAS Giannina	Contract termination	19 August 1973	
FW	(Argentina) Rodolfo Vicente	(Argentina) Ferro Carril Oeste	Contract termination	31 July 1973	
FW	(Greece) Spyros Pomonis	(Greece) Ethnikos Piraeus	Contract termination	22 August 1973	
FW	(Greece) Kostas Chanios	(Greece) Kalamata	Contract termination	4 August 1973	
FW	(Greece) Giannis Dandelis	(Greece) Panachaiki	Contract termination	31 July 1973	

=== Loan out ===
Pos.	Player	To	Fee	Date	Until	Option to buy	Source
FW	(Greece) Giorgos Kachris	(Greece) Kalamata	Free	1 July 1973	30 June 1974	✗	

=== Overall transfer activity ===
Expenditure: ▼ ₯6,650,000

Income: ▲ ₯0

Net Total: ▼ ₯6,650,000

== Pre-season and friendlies ==
7 August 1973 Friendly	Nyonnais	0–2	AEK Athens	Nyon
18:00 EET (UTC+2)		Report	Zarzopoulos 3'; Fanìs 39'	Stadium: Colovray Sports Centre
Note: 40-minute match (20-minute halves).

8 August 1973 Friendly	Chaux-de-Fonds	1–3	AEK Athens	La Chaux-de-Fonds
21:15 EET (UTC+2)	Delavelle 24'	Report	Konstantinou 5'; Fanìs 64'; Nikolaou 72'	Stadium: Centre Sportif de la Charrière; Attendance: 2,000; Referee: Fernand Burioli (Switzerland)

12 August 1973 Friendly	Chênois	1–1 (4–3 p)	AEK Athens	Thônex
19:30 EET (UTC+2)	Scheiwiller 29'	Report	Theodoridis (yellow card) 57'; Fanìs (red card) 57'; Konstantinou 66'	Stadium: Stade des Trois-Chêne; Referee: Roland Racine (Switzerland)
	Penalties
	Liechti (penalty missed); Kurz (penalty scored); Cucinotta (penalty scored); Bizzini (penalty scored); Samba (penalty scored)		(penalty missed) Stathopoulos; (penalty missed) Karafeskos; (penalty scored) Stefanidis; (penalty scored) Tanidis; (penalty scored) Konstantinou
Note: The match was abandoned at the 84th minute due to an error in the floodlights of the stadium and was agreed for the match to be decided on penalty shoot-out.

15 August 1973 Friendly	Yverdon-Sport	0–2	AEK Athens	Yverdon-les-Bains
21:15 EET (UTC+2)		Report	Konstantinou 12'; Panagiotopoulos 89'	Stadium: Stade Municipal; Attendance: 1,500; Referee: Ernest Guignet (Switzerland)

22 August 1973 Friendly	AEK Athens	3–2	Nacional	Nea Filadelfeia
20:30 EET (UTC+2)	Tanidis (yellow card); Zarzopoulos 16'; Nikolaou 76', 81'	Report	Artime 25'; Mamelli 88', (yellow card)	Stadium: AEK Stadium; Attendance: 30,000; Referee: Pan Marinos (Piraeus)

27 August 1973 Friendly	AEK Athens	4–1	PAS Giannina	Nea Filadelfeia
21:00 EET (UTC+2)	Konstantinou 29', 50', 68'; Karafeskos 54'	Report	Álvarez 81'	Stadium: AEK Stadium; Attendance: 29,000; Referee: Staikos

31 August 1973 Friendly	AEK Athens	3–0	Apollon Athens	Nea Filadelfeia
21:00 EET (UTC+2)	Konstantinou 29' (pen.); Zarzopoulos 36'; Karachisaridis 70'	Report		Stadium: AEK Stadium; Attendance: 18,000; Referee: Antonatos

6 September 1973 Friendly	AEK Athens	2–1	Lens	Nea Filadelfeia
21:00 EET (UTC+2)	Konstantinou 64', 76' (pen.)	Report	Faber 17' (pen.); Lemerre (yellow card) 83'	Stadium: AEK Stadium; Attendance: 25,000; Referee: Komninakis (Athens)

9 September 1973 Friendly	AEK Athens	3–1	Panserraikos	Nea Filadelfeia
20:30 EET (UTC+2)	Psimogiannos 13'; Kypritidis 54'; Karachisaridis 89'	Report	Kechagias 59'	Stadium: AEK Stadium; Attendance: 9,494; Referee: Makris (Athens)
Note: Friendly match as part of the transfer of Sakis Zarzopoulos and Spyros Stefanidis.

13 September 1973 Friendly	AEK Athens	2–0	Kickers Offenbach	Nea Filadelfeia
19:00 EET (UTC+2)	Nikolaou 75'; Konstantinou 88'	Report		Stadium: AEK Stadium; Attendance: 30,000; Referee: Dionysis Voulgaris (Athens)

15 September 1973 Friendly	PAOK	3–1	AEK Athens	Thessaloniki
20:30 EET (UTC+2)	Sarafis 24', 90'; Paridis 64'	Report	Nikolaou 21'	Stadium: Toumba Stadium; Attendance: 25,000; Referee: Martinis (Thessaloniki)

16 September 1973 Friendly	Moudania	0–2	AEK Athens	Nea Moudania
		Report	Karachisaridis 44'; Papaioannou 55'	Stadium: National Stadium of Nea Moudania; Attendance: 2,000; Referee: Giannakos (Macedonia)
Note: Friendly match as part of the transfer of Kostas Panagiotopoulos.

12 December 1973 Friendly	AEK Athens	2–1	Egaleo	Nea Filadelfeia
14:30 EET (UTC+2)	Fanìs 7', 81' (pen.)	Report	Venetis 78'	Stadium: AEK Stadium; Attendance: 2,000; Referee: Alekos Sofianidis

30 January 1974 Friendly	Korinthos	1–2	AEK Athens	Corinth
	Mitrou 70'	Report	Zarzopoulos 60', 79'	Stadium: Korinthos Stadium; Referee: Ioannidis
Note: On the bench of AEK was the assistant of Stan Anderson, Alekos Sofianidis.

19 March 1974 Friendly	AEK Athens	3–1	Greece	Nea Filadelfeia
14:30 EET (UTC+2)	Karachisaridis 16'; Fanìs 30' (pen.); Karafeskos 42'	Report	Antoniadis 55'	Stadium: AEK Stadium; Referee: Alekos Sofianidis
Note: Lakis Nikolaou and Dionysis Tsamis competed with Greece against their team.

21 March 1974 Friendly	Marko	1–6	AEK Athens	Markopoulo
14:30 EET (UTC+2)	Liagis 32'	Report	Karoulias 2'; Karachisaridis 11', 36'; Fanìs 22'; Makos 73'; Karafeskos 75'	Stadium: Municipal Stadium of Markopoulo; Referee: Alekos Sofianidis

3 April 1974 Friendly	Levadiakos	1–4	AEK Athens	Livadeia
	Kollias 36'	Report	Lavaridis 15'; Panagiotopoulos 29'; Zarzopoulos 68'; Karachisaridis 82'	Stadium: Levadia Municipal Stadium; Attendance: 4,000; Referee: Delinikolaou

10 April 1974 Friendly	Acharnaikos	2–3	AEK Athens	Acharnes
16:00 EET (UTC+2)	Thomakos 25' (pen.); Validis 70'	Report	Fanìs 5', 38'; Stefanidis 53' (pen.)	Stadium: Acharnes Stadium; Attendance: 1,500; Referee: Kattis

1 May 1974 Friendly	AEK Athens	6–1	Panerythraikos	Nea Filadelfeia
	Lavaridis 2'; Chondros 9' (o.g.); Karafeskos 23'; Fanìs 52'; Johnson 63'; Papaioannou 90+6'	Report	Fragoulis 40'	Stadium: AEK Stadium; Attendance: Behind closed doors Referee: Kostas Chatzimichail
Note: Sidiropoulos competed with Panerythraikos against AEK.

15 May 1974 Friendly	AEK Athens	5–1	Koukouvaounes	Nea Filadelfeia
17:00 EET (UTC+2)	Karachisaridis 31'; Fanìs 49', 77', 81'; Karafeskos 80' (pen.)	Report	Michalakis 36'	Stadium: AEK Stadium; Referee: Stelios Skevofilakas

22 May 1974 Friendly	AEK Athens	1–1	Rodos	Nea Filadelfeia
17:30 EET (UTC+2)	Zarzopoulos 75'	Report	Kottis 45'	Stadium: AEK Stadium; Attendance: 6,000; Referee: Gargaropoulos

28 May 1974 Friendly	AEK Athens	2–1	Bristol City	Nea Filadelfeia
21:00 EET (UTC+2)	Papaioannou 49', 85'	Report	Ravousis 56' (o.g.)	Stadium: AEK Stadium; Attendance: 25,000; Referee: Giannis Famelis (Athens)

2 June 1974 Friendly	AEK Athens	4–0	Panionios	Nea Filadelfeia
20:30 EET (UTC+2)	Wagner 27', 43'; Fanìs 51'; Tsamis 61'	Report	Theofilopoulos (yellow card) 34' (yellow-red card) 34'	Stadium: AEK Stadium; Attendance: 12,000; Referee: Christos Karasoulas (Athens)

11 June 1974 Friendly	AEK Athens	3–1	1860 München	Nea Filadelfeia
21:15 EET (UTC+2)	Zarzopoulos 60'; Konstantinou 71' (pen.), 76'	Report	Lubanski 45'	Stadium: AEK Stadium; Attendance: 25,000; Referee: Christos Michas (Athens)

20 June 1974 Friendly	Anorthosis Famagusta	1–4	AEK Athens	Lysi
20:30 EET (UTC+2)	Lyall 27'	Report	Konstantinou 9'; Lavaridis 50'; Zarzopoulos 58'; Makos 75'	Stadium: Grigoris Auxentiou Stadium; Referee: Kostas Xanthoulis (Cyprus)

24 June 1974 Friendly	AEK Athens	2–1	Ethnikos Piraeus	Nea Filadelfeia
21:00 EET (UTC+2)	Papaioannou 55'; Wagner 80'	Report	Calcaterra 83'	Stadium: AEK Stadium; Attendance: 7,326; Referee: Giorgos Ballis (Athens)

26 June 1974 Friendly	AEK Athens	4–3	Greece gendarmerie	Nea Filadelfeia
20:30 EET (UTC+2)	Ch. Apostolidis 18'; Papadopoulos 21', 60'; Wagner 62'	Report	Zervoudakis 15', 76'; Spyropoulos 20'	Stadium: AEK Stadium; Referee: Sfakianakis
Note: Stathopoulos competed with the Greek gendarmerie against AEK.

30 June 1974 Friendly	AEK Athens	1–2	Trikala	Nea Filadelfeia
21:00 EET (UTC+2)	Tzortzis 68'	Report	Chondros 29', 74'	Stadium: AEK Stadium; Referee: Koniaris
Note: Friendly match as part of the transfer of Giorgos Sidiropoulos.

== Competitions ==
=== Overall record ===
Competition	First match	Last match	Starting round	Final position	Record							
Competition	First match	Last match	Starting round	Final position	Pld	W	D	L	GF	GA	GD	Win %
Alpha Ethniki	23 September 1973	19 June 1974	Matchday 1	5th	34	16	8	10	53	36	+17	47.06
Greek Cup	26 December 1973	24 February 1974	First round	Round of 16	3	1	1	1	3	4	−1	33.33
Total					37	17	9	11	56	40	+16	45.95

Last updated: 19 June 1974
Source: Competitions

=== Alpha Ethniki ===
==== League table ====
Pos	Team	Pld	W	D	L	GF	GA	GD	Pts	Qualification or relegation
3	Aris	34	21	6	7	49	29	+20	48	Qualification for UEFA Cup first round
4	PAOK	34	16	11	7	62	32	+30	43	Qualification for Cup Winners' Cup first round
5	AEK Athens	34	16	8	10	53	36	+17	40	
6	Panachaiki	34	13	12	9	42	37	+5	38	
7	Iraklis	34	10	13	11	40	37	+3	33	

Source: RSSSF
Rules for classification: 1st points; 2nd decision match; 3rd head-to-head goal difference.

==== Results summary ====
Overall								Home						Away					
Pld	W	D	L	GF	GA	GD	Pts	W	D	L	GF	GA	GD	W	D	L	GF	GA	GD
34	16	8	10	53	36	+17	40	11	4	2	35	12	+23	5	4	8	18	24	−6

Source: Competitive matches

==== Results by Matchday ====
Round	1	2	3	4	5	6	7	8	9	10	11	12	13	14	15	16	17	18	19	20	21	22	23	24	25	26	27	28	29	30	31	32	33	34
Ground	H	A	H	A	H	A	H	H	A	H	A	H	A	H	A	A	H	A	H	A	H	A	H	A	A	H	A	H	A	H	A	H	H	A
Result	W	W	W	L	L	W	W	W	L	D	L	W	L	D	D	L	W	W	W	W	D	L	W	L	D	D	L	D	W	W	D	W	W	L
Position	1	1	2	5	6	5	5	4	5	5	6	5	6	5	6	6	6	6	6	5	5	5	5	6	6	6	6	6	6	6	6	5	5	5

Source: Competitive matches
A = Away; H = Home; W = Win; D = Draw; L = Loss; P = Postponed

==== Matches ====
23 September 1973 1	AEK Athens	4–0	Egaleo	Nea Filadelfeia
16:00 EET (UTC+2)	Papaioannou 6'; Nikolaou 24', 58'; Zarzopoulos 44'			Stadium: AEK Stadium; Attendance: 30,000; Referee: Eleftheriadis (Athens)

30 September 1973 2	Fostiras	1–4	AEK Athens	Tavros
16:00 EET (UTC+2)	Deimezis (yellow card); Rellis (yellow card); Synanidis (yellow card) (yellow-red card) 71'; Panopoulos 8'		Panagiotopoulos 52'; Nikolaou 62', 90'; Konstantinou 69'	Stadium: Tavros Stadium; Attendance: 10,800; Referee: Nikos Zlatanos (Thessaloniki)

7 October 1973 3	AEK Athens	3–0	Panserraikos	Nea Filadelfeia
15:30 EET (UTC+2)	Stathopoulos 16'; Nikolaou 55'; Zarzopoulos 56'			Stadium: AEK Stadium; Attendance: 27,000; Referee: Kastanos (Athens)

14 October 1973 4	Panathinaikos	1–0	AEK Athens	Ampelokipoi
15:30 EET (UTC+2)	De Melo 90+2' (pen.)		Papaioannou (yellow card) 28'	Stadium: Leoforos Alexandras Stadium; Attendance: 24,728; Referee: Alfred Delcourt (Belgium)

21 October 1973 5	AEK Athens	1–2	Iraklis	Nea Filadelfeia
15:30 EET (UTC+2)	Papaioannou 79'		Koutroubelis 5'; Pontikis 90'	Stadium: AEK Stadium; Attendance: 22,000; Referee: Giorgos Katsoras (Athens)

29 October 1973 6	Ethnikos Piraeus	1–2	AEK Athens	Piraeus
15:00 EET (UTC+2)	Lambrinos 11'		Zarzopoulos 4', 32'	Stadium: Karaiskakis Stadium; Attendance: 11,687; Referee: Kostas Xanthos (Dodecanese)

4 November 1973 7	AEK Athens	4–1	Apollon Kalamarias	Nea Filadelfeia
15:00 EET (UTC+2)	Papaioannou 9'; Tsamis 31'; Zarzopoulos 47'; Nikolaou 64'		Stavlas 88'	Stadium: AEK Stadium; Attendance: 17,973; Referee: Miltiadis Paschalidis (Serres)

11 November 1973 8	AEK Athens	4–1	Panionios	Nea Filadelfeia
15:00 EET (UTC+2)	Konstantinou 25' (pen.), 83'; Nikolaou 38'; Papaioannou 90'		Vourdamis (yellow card) 28'; Mavros (penalty missed) 89'; Mavrikis 89'	Stadium: AEK Stadium; Attendance: 24,575; Referee: Thomas Kaladamis (Athens)

2 December 1973 9	PAOK	3–0	AEK Athens	Thessaloniki
14:45 EET (UTC+2)	Paridis 55'; Terzanidis 64'; Aslanidis 65'			Stadium: Toumba Stadium; Attendance: 26,426; Referee: Nikos Zlatanos (Thessaloniki)

9 December 1973 10	AEK Athens	0–0	Olympiacos	Nea Filadelfeia
14:45 EET (UTC+2)				Stadium: AEK Stadium; Attendance: 30,000; Referee: Nikos Zlatanos (Thessaloniki)

16 December 1973 11	Aris	1–0	AEK Athens	Thessaloniki
14:45 EET (UTC+2)	Alexiadis 52'			Stadium: Aris Stadium; Attendance: 8,374; Referee: Kostas Xanthos (Dodecanese)

23 December 1973 12	AEK Athens	4–1	Apollon Athens	Nea Filadelfeia
14:45 EET (UTC+2)	Fanìs 39'; Zarzopoulos 47'; Stathopoulos 57', 73'		Oikonomou 32'	Stadium: AEK Stadium; Attendance: 11,858; Referee: Poulios (Magnesia)

30 December 1973 13	AEL	2–1	AEK Athens	Larissa
14:45 EET (UTC+2)	Rakintzoglou 6', 68'		Konstantinou 18'; Stathopoulos (yellow card) 47'; Zarzopoulos (yellow card) 63'	Stadium: Alcazar Stadium; Attendance: 12,895; Referee: Stathis Papavasiliou (Piraeus)

6 January 1974 14	AEK Athens	1–1	Panachaiki	Nea Filadelfeia
14:45 EET (UTC+2)	Papaioannou 7'		Aigerinopoulos 32'	Stadium: AEK Stadium; Attendance: 17,556; Referee: Nanos

13 January 1974 15	Kavala	1–1	AEK Athens	Kavala
14:45 EET (UTC+2)	Chrysafidis 53'		Konstantinou 75' (pen.)	Stadium: Kavala National Stadium; Attendance: 7,268; Referee: Christos Mittas (Thessaloniki)

20 January 1974 16	Olympiacos Volos	2–1	AEK Athens	Volos
15:00 EET (UTC+2)	Karaiskos 79' (pen.), 82'		Papaioannou 40'	Stadium: Volos Municipal Stadium; Attendance: 5,681; Referee: Pan Marinos (Piraeus)

27 January 1974 17	AEK Athens	3–1	APOEL	Nea Filadelfeia
15:00 EET (UTC+2)	Zarzopoulos 50'; Konstantinou 53' (pen.), 85'		Leonidou 90'	Stadium: AEK Stadium; Attendance: 11,867; Referee: Nikos Lagogiannis (Piraeus)

3 February 1974 18	Egaleo	2–3	AEK Athens	Aigaleo
15:00 EET (UTC+2)	Venetis 45'; Chastalis 49'		Zarzopoulos 47'; Konstantinou 82', 87'	Stadium: Stavros Mavrothalassitis Stadium; Attendance: 11,181; Referee: Nanos

10 February 1974 19	AEK Athens	2–0	Fostiras	Nea Filadelfeia
15:00 EET (UTC+2)	Konstantinou 75' (pen.); Fanìs 90'			Stadium: AEK Stadium; Attendance: 17,581; Referee: Nikos Giannopoulos (Athens)

17 February 1974 20	Panserraikos	0–1	AEK Athens	Serres
15:00 EET (UTC+2)			Zarzopoulos (yellow card); Fanìs 72'	Stadium: Serres Municipal Stadium; Attendance: 5,043; Referee: Dionysis Voulgaris (Athens)

3 March 1974 21	AEK Athens	0–2	Panathinaikos	Nea Filadelfeia
15:30 EET (UTC+2)	Stefanidis (yellow card)		Grammos 63'; Antoniadis 82'	Stadium: AEK Stadium; Attendance: 29,800; Referee: Manolis Platopoulos (Athens)

10 March 1974 22	Iraklis	1–1	AEK Athens	Thessaloniki
16:00 EET (UTC+2)	Koutroubelis 12'		Karypidis 43'; Theodoridis (yellow card) 65'	Stadium: Kaftanzoglio Stadium; Attendance: 9,235; Referee: Kostas Xanthos (Dodecanese)

17 March 1974 23	AEK Athens	3–1	Ethnikos Piraeus	Nea Filadelfeia
16:00 EET (UTC+2)	Konstantinou 10' (pen.), 29'; Theodoridis (red card) 46'; Papaioannou 61'		Kardiakidis 73'	Stadium: AEK Stadium; Attendance: 8,392; Referee: Kefalas (Thessaloniki)

24 March 1974 24	Apollon Kalamarias	1–0	AEK Athens	Thessaloniki
16:30 EET (UTC+2)	Papadopoulos (yellow card) 17'; Patsis 43'			Stadium: Kalamaria Stadium; Attendance: 3,273; Referee: Andreas Sakellariou (Patras)

31 March 1974 25	Panionios	1–1	AEK Athens	Nea Smyrni
16:30 EET (UTC+2)	Mavros 57'		Stefanidis (yellow card); Tsamis 44'	Stadium: Nea Smyrni Stadium; Attendance: 13,218; Referee: Dilzas (Thessaloniki)

7 April 1974 26	AEK Athens	0–0	PAOK	Nea Filadelfeia
16:30 EET (UTC+2)	Stefanidis (yellow card) 50'		Paridis (yellow card) 33'	Stadium: AEK Stadium; Attendance: 17,549; Referee: Kostas Xanthos (Dodecanese)

15 April 1974 27	Olympiacos	4–0	AEK Athens	Piraeus
16:30 EET (UTC+2)	Delikaris 49'; Stavropoulos 71'; Triantafyllos 76', 78'			Stadium: Karaiskakis Stadium; Attendance: 26,548; Referee: Papazoglou (Athens)

21 April 1974 28	AEK Athens	1–1	Aris	Nea Filadelfeia
17:00 EET (UTC+2)	Fanìs 12'		Kasapis 38'	Stadium: AEK Stadium; Attendance: 9,133; Referee: Manolis Platopoulos (Athens)

5 May 1974 29	Apollon Athens	0–1	AEK Athens	Rizoupoli
17:00 EET (UTC+2)	Pathiakakis (yellow card) 65'		Konstantinou 13' (pen.); Tanidis (red card) 28'	Stadium: Rizoupoli Stadium; Attendance: 8,658; Referee: Amarantidis

12 May 1974 30	AEK Athens	1–0	AEL	Nea Filadelfeia
17:00 EET (UTC+2)	Konstantinou 12'			Stadium: AEK Stadium; Attendance: 11,279; Referee: Christos Mittas (Thessaloniki)

19 May 1974 31	Panachaiki	1–1	AEK Athens	Patras
17:30 EET (UTC+2)	Fanìs 12'		Stravopodis (yellow card) 7'; Davourlis 33'	Stadium: Panachaiki Stadium; Attendance: 10,433; Referee: Giarenis

5 June 1974 32	AEK Athens	1–0	Kavala	Nea Filadelfeia
17:30 EET (UTC+2)	Fanìs 79'			Stadium: AEK Stadium; Attendance: 8,094; Referee: Stathis Papavasiliou (Piraeus)

9 June 1974 33	AEK Athens	3–1	Olympiacos Volos	Nea Filadelfeia
17:30 EET (UTC+2)	Giakakoglou 44' (o.g.); Panagiotopoulos 72'; Karoulias 81'		Karaiskos 64'	Stadium: AEK Stadium; Attendance: 8,576; Referee: Vasilis Vourakis (Piraeus)

19 June 1974 34	APOEL	2–1	AEK Athens	Nicosia
17:30 EET (UTC+2)	Michail 6'; Timotheou 7'		Zarzopoulos 75'	Stadium: GSP Stadium; Attendance: 6,282; Referee: Pan Marinos (Piraeus)

=== Greek Cup ===
==== Matches ====
26 December 1973 First round	AEK Athens	3–0	Olympiakos Neon Liosion	Nea Filadelfeia
14:15 EET (UTC+2)	Nikolaou 24', 66', 78'			Stadium: AEK Stadium; Referee: Giannikakis (Piraeus)

23 January 1974 Round of 32	AEK Athens	0–0 (a.e.t.) (4–3 p)	Atromitos	Nea Filadelfeia
14:15 EET (UTC+2)				Stadium: AEK Stadium; Referee: Christos Michas (Athens)
	Penalties
	Konstantinou (penalty missed); Papaioannou (penalty scored); Stefanidis (penalty scored); Ravousis (penalty missed); Nikolaou (penalty scored); Karafeskos (penalty scored)		(penalty scored) Stoligas; (penalty missed) Tsivgoulis; (penalty scored) Christopoulos; (penalty missed) Adamidis; (penalty scored) Konstantinidis; (penalty missed) Kapatsos

24 February 1974 Round of 16	PAOK	3–1	AEK Athens	Thessaloniki
15:00 EET (UTC+2)	Paridis 27'; Aslanidis 50'; Sarafis 80' (pen.)		Nikolaou 38'	Stadium: Toumba Stadium; Attendance: 23,597; Referee: Nikos Zlatanos (Thessaloniki)

== Statistics ==
=== Squad statistics ===
As of 19 June 1974

No.	Pos	Player	Alpha Ethniki		Greek Cup		Total	
No.	Pos	Player	Apps	Goals	Apps	Goals	Apps	Goals
Goalkeepers
—	GK	(Argentina) Néstor Errea	15	0	2	0	17	0
—	GK	(Greece) Giorgos Sidiropoulos	18	0	1	0	19	0
—	GK	(Greece) Lakis Stergioudas	2	0	0	0	2	0
Defenders
—	DF	(Greece) Spyros Stefanidis	28	0	3	0	31	0
—	DF	(Greece) Giorgos Tanidis	17	0	1	0	18	0
—	DF	(Greece) Apostolos Toskas	9	0	2	0	11	0
—	DF	(Greece) Sakis Zarzopoulos	33	9	1	0	34	9
—	DF	(Greece) Stefanos Theodoridis	30	0	3	0	33	0
—	DF	(Greece) Nikos Karoulias	3	1	0	0	3	1
—	DF	(Greece) Giorgos Kontopoulos	11	0	2	0	13	0
—	DF	(Greece) Petros Ravousis	27	0	2	0	29	0
Midfielders
—	MF	(Greece) Nikos Stathopoulos	22	3	1	0	23	3
—	MF	(Greece) Giorgos Karafeskos	16	0	2	0	18	0
—	MF	(Greece) Giorgos Lavaridis	19	0	2	0	21	0
—	MF	(Greece) Lazaros Papadopoulos	2	0	0	0	2	0
—	MF	(Greece) Dionysis Tsamis	30	2	1	0	31	2
—	MF	(Greece) Vangelis Makos	3	0	0	0	3	0
Forwards
—	FW	(Greece) Mimis Papaioannou	24	7	2	0	26	7
—	FW	(Greece) Takis Karachisaridis	6	0	1	0	7	0
—	FW	(Greece) Babis Psimogiannos	8	0	1	0	9	0
—	FW	(Greece) Lakis Nikolaou	28	7	3	4	31	11
—	FW	(Cyprus) Tasos Konstantinou	33	14	2	0	35	14
—	FW	(Uruguay) Jorge Falero Fanìs	21	6	3	0	24	6
—	FW	(Greece) Kostas Panagiotopoulos	15	2	1	0	16	2
—	FW	(Greece) Ivan Kypritidis	3	0	0	0	3	0
—	FW	(Greece) Stefanos Karypidis	5	1	1	0	6	1

=== Goalscorers ===
As of 19 June 1974
The list is sorted by competition order when total goals are equal, then by position and then alphabetically by surname.

Rank	Pos.	Player	Alpha Ethniki	Greek Cup	Total
1	FW	(Cyprus) Tasos Konstantinou	14	0	14
2	FW	(Greece) Lakis Nikolaou	7	4	11
3	DF	(Greece) Sakis Zarzopoulos	9	0	9
4	FW	(Greece) Mimis Papaioannou	7	0	7
5	FW	(Uruguay) Jorge Falero Fanìs	6	0	6
6	MF	(Greece) Nikos Stathopoulos	3	0	3
7	MF	(Greece) Dionysis Tsamis	2	0	2
7	FW	(Greece) Kostas Panagiotopoulos	2	0	2
9	DF	(Greece) Nikos Karoulias	1	0	1
9	FW	(Greece) Stefanos Karypidis	1	0	1
Own goals			1	0	1
Totals			53	4	57

=== Hat-tricks ===
Numbers in superscript represent the goals that the player scored.

Player	Against	Result	Date	Competition	Source
(Greece) Lakis Nikolaou	(Greece) Olympiakos Neon Liosion	3–0 (H)	26 December 1973	Greek Cup	

=== Clean sheets ===
As of 19 June 1974
The list is sorted by competition order when total clean sheets are equal and then alphabetically by surname. Clean sheets in games where both goalkeepers participated are awarded to the goalkeeper who started the game. Goalkeepers with no appearances are not included.

Rank	Player	Alpha Ethniki	Greek Cup	Total
1	(Greece) Giorgos Sidiropoulos	6	0	6
2	(Argentina) Néstor Errea	3	2	5
3	(Greece) Lakis Stergioudas	0	0	0
Totals		9	2	11

=== Disciplinary record ===
As of 19 June 1974

N	P	Nat.	Name	Alpha Ethniki			Greek Cup			Total			Notes
N	P	Nat.	Name	Yellow card	Second yellow card	Red card	Yellow card	Second yellow card	Red card	Yellow card	Second yellow card	Red card	Notes
Goalkeepers
—	GK	(Argentina)	Néstor Errea										
—	GK	(Greece)	Giorgos Sidiropoulos										
—	GK	(Greece)	Lakis Stergioudas										
Defenders
—	DF	(Greece)	Spyros Stefanidis	3						3			
—	DF	(Greece)	Giorgos Tanidis			1						1	
—	DF	(Greece)	Apostolos Toskas										
—	DF	(Greece)	Sakis Zarzopoulos	2						2			
—	DF	(Greece)	Stefanos Theodoridis	1		1				1		1	
—	DF	(Greece)	Nikos Karoulias										
—	DF	(Greece)	Giorgos Kontopoulos										
—	DF	(Greece)	Petros Ravousis										
Midfielders
—	MF	(Greece)	Nikos Stathopoulos	1						1			
—	MF	(Greece)	Giorgos Karafeskos										
—	MF	(Greece)	Giorgos Lavaridis										
—	MF	(Greece)	Lazaros Papadopoulos										
—	MF	(Greece)	Dionysis Tsamis										
—	MF	(Greece)	Vangelis Makos										
Forwards
—	FW	(Greece)	Mimis Papaioannou	1						1			
—	FW	(Greece)	Takis Karachisaridis										
—	FW	(Greece)	Babis Psimogiannos										
—	FW	(Greece)	Lakis Nikolaou										
—	FW	(Cyprus)	Tasos Konstantinou										
—	FW	(Uruguay)	Jorge Falero Fanìs										
—	FW	(Greece)	Kostas Panagiotopoulos										
—	FW	(Greece)	Ivan Kypritidis										
—	FW	(Greece)	Stefanos Karypidis										

=== Starting 11 ===
This section presents the most frequently used formation along with the players with the most starts across all competitions.

N.	Formation	Matchday(s)
24	4–3–3	1–3, 6, 8, 9, 11, 12, 14, 16–18, 20, 21, 25–31, 34
13	4–4–2	4, 5, 7, 10, 13, 15, 19, 22–24, 32, 33

Nat.	Player	Pos.
(Greece)	Giorgos Sidiropoulos	GK
(Greece)	Petros Ravousis	RCB
(Greece)	Spyros Stefanidis	LCB
(Greece)	Stefanos Theodoridis	RB
(Greece)	Nikos Stathopoulos	LB
(Greece)	Sakis Zarzopoulos	DM
(Greece)	Dionysis Tsamis	RCM
(Greece)	Giorgos Karafeskos	LCM
(Cyprus)	Tasos Konstantinou	RW
(Greece)	Mimis Papaioannou (C)	LW
(Greece)	Lakis Nikolaou	CF

Last updated: 1974-06-19
