= 1975–76 AEK Athens F.C. season =

AEK Athens
1975–76 season
- Chairman: Loukas Barlos
- Manager: František Fadrhonc
- Stadium: AEK Stadium
- Alpha Ethniki: 2nd
- Greek Cup: Semi-finals
- UEFA Cup: Second round
- Top goalscorer: League: Georgios Dedes (15); All: Georgios Dedes (19)
- Highest home attendance: 30,000 vs Olympiacos (12 May 1976)
- Lowest home attendance: 4,081 vs Anagennisi Karditsa (8 February 1976)
- Average home league attendance: 16,296
- Biggest win: AEK Athens 7–0 Agios Dimitrios
- Biggest defeat: Inter Bratislava 2–0 AEK Athens; PAS Giannina 2–0 AEK Athens
Home colours	Away colours

The 1975–76 season was the 52nd season in the existence of AEK Athens F.C. and the 17th consecutive season in the top flight of Greek football. They competed in the Alpha Ethniki, the Greek Cup and the UEFA Cup. The season began on 17 September 1975 and finished on 23 May 1976.

== Kits ==
Home	Away

== Overview ==
In the summer of 1975, Loukas Barlos, setting everything else aside, focused his efforts on signing Thomas Mavros. The 21-year-old striker of Panionios had impressed with his performances and he decided that it was time to move to one of the major clubs of the league. Barlos, true to his usual approach, was prepared to make a substantial offer for the player, but Panionios was blocking the transfer. The president of AEK approached Mavros and convinced him to join his club. The player pushed for his transfer, but was met with a relentless stance from Panionios. A legal dispute began, after Mavros' brother, who also acted as his lawyer, discovered that their father's consent had never been signed when the player joined Panionios as a minor. Until the dispute was resolved, Mavros was ineligible to compete for either club, in a situation similar to that of Kostas Nestoridis in 1955. Meanwhile, the work of František Fadrhonc with the team was beginning to bear fruit, as AEK developed into an attractive and effective side.

After two consecutive years of absence from European competitions, AEK returned to the UEFA Cup. The draw brought them against the Yugoslav Vojvodina. The first match at Karađorđe Stadium ended 0–0, while the yellow-blacks secured qualification with a 3–1 victory in the rematch. In the second round, the draw brought AEK against the Czechoslovak Inter Bratislava. In the first match at Bratislava, the Greek club faced a defeat by 2–0. In the rematch at Nea Filadelfeia the Czechoslovaks took an early lead in the second minute and the task of AEK became even more difficult. The yellow-blacks managed to turn the game around by scoring three goals in the second half, but were unable to score the fourth goal required to overturn the aggregate deficit.

In the league, AEK remained undefeated for 23 consecutive games and reached seven matches before the finish, with the title race in their own hands. Unfortunately, they lost both of their next two matches to Panathinaikos and Aris respectively. Furthermore, another defeat at the hands of PAOK resulted in their second place finish for a second season in a row, five points from the top, allowing PAOK to secure the title. Fadrhonc's attacking style of play resulted in Georgios Dedes finishing as the league's top scorer with 15 goals, while Walter Wagner and Mimis Papaioannou also finished among the league's top scorers with 11 goals each.

In the Cup, AEK eliminated Agios Dimitrios 7–0 in the first round, Anagennisi Karditsa 2–1 in the second round, Olympiakos Neon Liosion 6–0 in the third round at home. In the quarter-finals, they faced Fostiras at Tavros Stadium and won 1–0. In the semi-finals, they were drawn against Olympiacos at home and despite taking the lead early on, they eventually lost the match by 3–2 and were eliminated from the competition.

== Management team ==
Position	Staff
Manager	(Czechoslovakia) František Fadrhonc
Assistant manager	(Greece) Efthymis Kazakis
Goalkeeping coach	(Greece) Stelios Serafidis
Academy manager	(Greece) Andreas Stamatiadis

== Players ==
=== Squad information ===
NOTE: The players are the ones that have been announced by the AEK Athens' press release. No edits should be made unless a player arrival or exit is announced. Updated 23 May 1976, 23:59 UTC+3.

Player	Nat.	Position(s)	Date of birth (Age)	Signed	Previous club	Transfer fee	Contract until
Goalkeepers
Giorgos Sidiropoulos	(Greece)	GK	25 June 1949 (aged 27)	1973	(Greece) Trikala	₯1,800,000	1981
Lakis Stergioudas	(Greece)	GK	11 December 1952 (aged 23)	1972	(Greece) Niki Polygyros	₯36,000	1981
Defenders
Giorgos Skrekis	(Greece)	RB / CB	2 February 1945 (aged 31)	1974	(Greece) Panionios	₯500,000	1982
Spyros Stefanidis	(Greece)	CB / RB	18 December 1946 (aged 29)	1973	(Greece) Panserraikos	₯500,000	1981
Apostolos Toskas	(Greece)	CB	28 December 1947 (aged 28)	1969	(Greece) Trikala	₯1,500,000	1977
Lakis Nikolaou	(Greece)	CB / RB / ST / RW	17 July 1949 (aged 26)	1971	(Greece) Atromitos	₯600,000	1979
Sakis Zarzopoulos	(Greece)	CB / DM / RB / LB	15 December 1949 (aged 26)	1973	(Greece) Panserraikos	₯2,500,000	1981
Stefanos Theodoridis	(Greece)	RB / LB / CB / RM / LM	19 June 1950 (aged 26)	1969	(Greece) AEK Athens U20	—	1977
Nikos Karoulias	(Greece)	LB / LM / AM	25 May 1953 (aged 23)	1973	(Greece) AEK Athens U20	—	1981
Petros Ravousis	(Greece)	CB / RB	1 October 1954 (aged 21)	1972	(Greece) Aetos Skydra	Free	1981
Midfielders
Giorgos Lavaridis	(Greece)	CM / DM / CB	15 October 1947 (aged 28)	1968	(Greece) AEK Athens U20	—	1976
Timo Zahnleiter	(West Germany)	CM / DM / LB	16 December 1948 (aged 27)	1974	(West Germany) 1860 München	₯1,200,000	1976
Takis Timotheou	(Cyprus)	AM / CB	1949 (aged 26–27)	1974	(Cyprus) APOEL	Free	1982
Lazaros Papadopoulos	(Greece)	RM / RB / LM / LB / RW / LW	3 January 1950 (aged 26)	1973	(Greece) Veria	₯1,300,000	1981
Dionysis Tsamis	(Greece)	CM / DM / AM	17 October 1951 (aged 24)	1972	(Greece) Panetolikos	₯2,350,000	1981
Christos Ardizoglou	(Greece) (Israel)	RM / LM / RW / LW / AM / RB / LB	25 March 1953 (aged 23)	1974	(Greece) Apollon Athens	₯12,000,000	1982
Forwards
Mimis Papaioannou (Captain)	(Greece)	SS / ST / AM / RW	17 November 1942 (aged 33)	1962	(Greece) Veria	₯175,000	1976
Georgios Dedes	(Greece)	ST / SS / RW / LW / RM / LM	25 February 1943 (aged 33)	1974	(Greece) Panionios	₯1,000,000	1982
Walter Wagner	(West Germany)	ST / SS / RW / LW / RM	26 July 1949 (aged 26)	1974	Austria Wien	Free	1976
Tasos Konstantinou	(Cyprus)	RW / SS / ST / RM / AM	11 March 1951 (aged 25)	1972	(Cyprus) EPA Larnaca	₯600,000	1980

== Transfers ==
=== Out ===
Pos.	Player	To	Fee	Date	Source
GK	(Argentina) Néstor Errea	(Greece) Apollon Athens	End of contract	28 July 1975	
GK	(Greece) Giorgos Daditsos	(Greece) Panachaiki	Contract termination	30 July 1975	
DF	(Greece) Giorgos Kontopoulos	(Greece) Panachaiki	Contract termination	30 July 1975	
MF	(Greece) Vangelis Makos	(Greece) Panionios	Contract termination	4 August 1975	
FW	(Uruguay) Jorge Falero Fanìs	(Uruguay) Montevideo Wanderers	End of contract	1 July 1975	

=== Loan out ===
Pos.	Player	To	Fee	Date	Until	Option to buy	Source
DF	(Greece) Victoras Theofilopoulos	(Greece) Kastoria	Free	31 July 1975	30 June 1976	✗	

=== Overall transfer activity ===
Expenditure: ▼ ₯0

Income: ▲ ₯0

Net Total: ₯0

== Pre-season and friendlies ==
30 July 1975 Friendly	AEK Athens	5–1	AEK Athens Veterans	Nea Filadelfeia
18:20 EEST (UTC+3)	Papaioannou 21', 26', 87'; Tsamis 40'; Konstantinou 55'	Report	Ventouris 46'	Stadium: AEK Stadium; Attendance: 10,000; Referee: Efthymis Kazakis
Note: The team of the veterans was consisted of Serafidis, Kefalidis, Yordan, Vasiliou, Sofianidis, Skevofilakas, Petridis, Nestoridis, Stamatiadis, Pomonis, Balopoulos, Stathopoulos, Ventouris, Simigdalas and Maniateas.

6 August 1975 Friendly	AEK Athens	1–2	Club Brugge	Nea Filadelfeia
21:00 EEST (UTC+3)	Dedes 31'	Report	Holenstein 48'; Lambert 59'	Stadium: AEK Stadium; Attendance: 18,000; Referee: Christos Karasoulas (Athens)
Note: At the bench of Club Brugge was the assistant manager, Mathieu Bollen.

13 August 1975 Friendly	AEK Athens	4–1	Rapid București	Nea Filadelfeia
21:00 EEST (UTC+3)	Wagner 6', 75'; Papadopoulos 34'; Papaioannou 67'	Report	Grigoraș 78'	Stadium: AEK Stadium; Attendance: 15,000; Referee: Thomas Kaladamis (Athens)

20 August 1975 Friendly	AEK Athens	2–0	OFK Beograd	Nea Filadelfeia
21:00 EEST (UTC+3)	Mavros 3' (pen.); Wagner 38'	Report		Stadium: AEK Stadium; Attendance: 11,000; Referee: Takis Moumtzis (Athens)

27 August 1975 Friendly	AEK Athens	4–0	Panathinaikos	Nea Filadelfeia
21:00 EEST (UTC+3)	Ardizoglou 51', (yellow card) 63'; Wagner 52'; Papaioannou 60'; Dedes 75'; Nikolaou (yellow card) 76'	Report	Dimitriou (yellow card) 16'; Papadimitriou (yellow card) 38'; Vakalis (yellow card) 50'	Stadium: AEK Stadium; Attendance: 35,000; Referee: Nikos Fakis (Athens)

31 August 1975 Friendly	Olympiacos	0–0	AEK Athens	Piraeus
20:30 EET (UTC+2)		Report		Stadium: Karaiskakis Stadium; Attendance: 45,000; Referee: Misailidis (Piraeus)

3 September 1975 Friendly	AEK Athens	3–2	ADO Den Haag	Nea Filadelfeia
21:00 EEST (UTC+3)	Zarzopoulos 61'; Dedes 69'; Wagner 89'	Report	Van Leeuwen 56', 81'	Stadium: Nikos Goumas Stadium; Attendance: 12,000; Referee: Karvelis

10 September 1975 Friendly	Panathinaikos	3–0	AEK Athens	Ampelokipoi
21:00 EEST (UTC+3)	Livathinos 13'; Papadimitriou 30', 38'	Report		Stadium: Leoforos Alexandras Stadium; Attendance: 25,000; Referee: Komninakis (Athens)

13 September 1975 Friendly	AEK Athens	3–1	Panetolikos	Nea Filadelfeia
21:00 EEST (UTC+3)	Theodoropoulos 10'; Ardizoglou 33'; Askalidis 80'	Report	Alexiadis 56'	Stadium: Nikos Goumas Stadium; Attendance: 7,000; Referee: Giorgos Abatzoglou (Athens)

24 September 1975 Friendly	AEK Athens	0–2	PAS Giannina	Nea Filadelfeia
21:00 EEST (UTC+3)		Report	Mantos 67'; Leventakos 75' (pen.)	Stadium: Nikos Goumas Stadium; Attendance: 8,000; Referee: Kostas Levogiannis (Athens)

27 September 1975 Friendly	AEK Athens	1–0	Atromitos	Nea Filadelfeia
20:30 EEST (UTC+3)	Tapratzis 32' (o.g.)	Report		Stadium: Nikos Goumas Stadium; Referee: Giaglis (Athens)

12 October 1975 Friendly	Panetolikos	1–0	AEK Athens	Agrinio
16:30 EEST (UTC+3)	Gavalas 65'	Report		Stadium: Panetolikos Stadium; Referee: Loukas

31 December 1975 Friendly	AEK Athens	7–0	Greece U19	Nea Filadelfeia
15:00 EET (UTC+2)	Konstantinou 3' (pen.), 47' (pen.), 72'; Wagner 10', 19'; Ardizoglou 24'; Karoulias 88'	Report	Alamanos (yellow card) (yellow-red card) 52'	Stadium: AEK Stadium; Attendance: 964; Referee: Iliadis

7 January 1976 Friendly	AEK Athens	2–0	Alemannia Aachen	Nea Filadelfeia
15:00 EET (UTC+2)	Nikolaou 1'; Mavros 54'; Ardizoglou (penalty missed) 79'	Report		Stadium: AEK Stadium; Attendance: 3,037; Referee: Manolis Platopoulos (Athens)

3 June 1976 Friendly	AEK Athens	3–3	Greece gendarmerie	Nea Filadelfeia
17:30 EEST (UTC+3)	Theodoropoulos 47', 72'; Anastasopoulos 55'	Report	Satarakis 28'; Zervoudakis 32', 40'	Stadium: AEK Stadium

== Competitions ==
=== Overall record ===
Competition	First match	Last match	Starting round	Final position	Record							
Competition	First match	Last match	Starting round	Final position	Pld	W	D	L	GF	GA	GD	Win %
Alpha Ethniki	5 October 1975	23 May 1976	Matchday 1	2nd	30	18	8	4	57	18	+39	60.00
Greek Cup	2 November 1975	12 May 1976	First round	Semi-finals	5	4	0	1	18	5	+13	80.00
UEFA Cup	17 September 1975	5 November 1975	First round	Second round	4	2	1	1	6	4	+2	50.00
Total					39	24	9	6	81	27	+54	61.54

Last updated: 23 May 1976
Source: Competitions

=== Alpha Ethniki ===
==== League table ====
Pos	Team	Pld	W	D	L	GF	GA	GD	Pts	Qualification
1	PAOK (C)	30	21	7	2	60	17	+43	49	Qualification for European Cup first round
2	AEK Athens	30	18	8	4	57	18	+39	44	Qualification for UEFA Cup first round
3	Olympiacos	30	16	9	5	48	28	+20	41	Qualification for UEFA Cup first round
4	Panathinaikos	30	14	10	6	47	28	+19	38	
5	PAS Giannina	30	15	6	9	40	33	+7	36	

Source: RSSSF
Rules for classification: 1st points; 2nd decision match; 3rd head-to-head goal difference.
(C) Champions

==== Results summary ====
Overall								Home						Away					
Pld	W	D	L	GF	GA	GD	Pts	W	D	L	GF	GA	GD	W	D	L	GF	GA	GD
30	18	8	4	57	18	+39	44	12	2	1	38	6	+32	6	6	3	19	12	+7

Source: Competitive matches

==== Results by Matchday ====
Round	1	2	3	4	5	6	7	8	9	10	11	12	13	14	15	16	17	18	19	20	21	22	23	24	25	26	27	28	29	30
Ground	H	A	H	A	A	H	A	H	A	H	A	H	H	A	H	A	H	A	H	H	A	H	A	H	A	H	A	A	H	A
Result	W	W	W	W	D	W	D	W	D	W	W	D	W	D	W	D	W	W	D	W	W	W	W	L	L	W	L	D	W	L
Position	1	1	1	1	1	1	1	1	1	1	1	1	1	1	1	1	1	1	1	1	1	1	1	1	2	2	2	2	2	2

Source: Competitive matches
A = Away; H = Home; W = Win; D = Draw; L = Loss; P = Postponed

==== Matches ====
5 October 1975 1	AEK Athens	4–0	Kastoria	Nea Filadelfeia
16:30 EEST (UTC+3)	Dedes 54', 63', 89'; Papaioannou 78'			Stadium: AEK Stadium; Attendance: 16,110; Referee: Giorgos Parasidis (Thessaloniki)

19 October 1975 2	Panionios	0–2	AEK Athens	Nea Smyrni
16:00 EEST (UTC+3)	Chaitas (yellow card) 47' (yellow-red card) 71'; Christodoulou (yellow card) 70'		Ardizoglou 10'; Papaioannou 88'	Stadium: Nea Smyrni Stadium; Attendance: 18,427; Referee: Antonis Vassaras (Thessaloniki)

26 October 1975 3	AEK Athens	5–1	Panachaiki	Nea Filadelfeia
15:00 EET (UTC+2)	Dedes 16', 52'; Wagner 42', 61'; Zahnleiter 76'		Stamatopoulos 8'	Stadium: AEK Stadium; Attendance: 16,338; Referee: Dimitris Sarakinos (Messinia)

9 November 1975 4	Olympiacos	0–2	AEK Athens	Piraeus
14:30 EET (UTC+2)	Gaitatzis (yellow card) 5'; Delikaris (yellow card) 15'		Papadopoulos (yellow card) 10'; Papaioannou 60', 70'	Stadium: Karaiskakis Stadium; Attendance: 38,778; Referee: Giorgos Katsoras (Thessaloniki)

16 November 1975 5	Apollon Athens	2–2	AEK Athens	Rizoupoli
14:30 EET (UTC+2)	Rokkas 16'; Nikolaidis 78'		Konstantinou 22' (pen.); Ardizoglou 60'	Stadium: Rizoupoli Stadium; Attendance: 13,230; Referee: Nikos Lagogiannis (Piraeus)

23 November 1975 6	AEK Athens	1–0	Iraklis	Nea Filadelfeia
14:30 EET (UTC+2)	Nikolaou 90+1'		Kousoulakis (yellow card) 38'	Stadium: AEK Stadium; Attendance: 18,532; Referee: Timoleon Latsios (Larissa)

30 November 1975 7	Atromitos	0–0	AEK Athens	Peristeri
14:30 EET (UTC+2)	Stefanidis (yellow card) 68'		De Melo (red card) 44'	Stadium: Peristeri Stadium; Attendance: 11,268; Referee: Piloridis

7 December 1975 8	AEK Athens	1–0	Ethnikos Piraeus	Nea Filadelfeia
14:30 EET (UTC+2)	Konstantinou 80'			Stadium: AEK Stadium; Attendance: 22,021; Referee: Pagourtzis (Phthiotis)

14 December 1975 9	Panathinaikos	2–2	AEK Athens	Ampelokipoi
14:30 EET (UTC+2)	Eleftherakis 26'; Mujkić 54'		Nikolaou (yellow card); Wagner 64'; Zahnleiter 81'	Stadium: Leoforos Alexandras Stadium; Attendance: 24,960; Referee: Eleftheriadis (Athens)
Note: The second goal of Panathinaikos that was scored with a free-kick by Mujkić, was illegal, as the player executed it directly without the referee's whistle who was measuring the distance of the wall and had shown that the foul was indirect. After the referee awarded the goal, the AEK fans caused inicidents for which AEK were punished by the HFF with 3-game stadium ban. The referee was also punished with a 45-day compulsory holiday.

21 December 1975 10	AEK Athens	2–1	Aris	Nea Filadelfeia
14:30 EET (UTC+2)	Skrekis 35'; Wagner 52'		Stavridis 3'	Stadium: AEK Stadium; Attendance: 9,795; Referee: Kostas Krikonis (Epirus)

4 January 1976 11	Panetolikos	1–3	AEK Athens	Agrinio
14:30 EET (UTC+2)	Kostopoulos (yellow card) 22'; Glykokalamos (red card) 64'; Alexiadis 84'		Dedes 5'; Papaioannou 43'; Konstantinou 75'	Stadium: Panetolikos Stadium; Attendance: 9,430; Referee: Pan Marinos (Piraeus)

11 January 1976 12	AEK Athens	0–0	PAOK	Patras
14:30 EET (UTC+2)	Wagner (yellow card) 67'			Stadium: Panachaiki Stadium; Attendance: 20,105; Referee: Theodoros Tsanaklidis (Kavala)
Note: Match held at Patras due to AEK's punishment with stadium ban for incidents in the match against Aris.

18 January 1976 13	AEK Athens	4–0	Panserraikos	Aigio
14:30 EET (UTC+2)	Konstantinou 12', 32' (pen.); Wagner 17'; Zahnleiter 84'			Stadium: Aigio Municipal Stadium; Attendance: 5,683; Referee: Christos Dilzas (Thessaloniki)
Note: Match held at Aigio due to AEK's punishment with stadium ban for incidents in the match against Aris.

25 January 1976 14	Pierikos	0–0	AEK Athens	Katerini
14:30 EET (UTC+2)				Stadium: Katerini Stadium; Attendance: 10,966; Referee: Michalis Ornerakis (Chania)

1 February 1976 15	AEK Athens	1–0	PAS Giannina	Argos
15:00 EET (UTC+2)	Papaioannou 85'		Kontogeorgakis (red card) 85'; Álvarez (red card) 85'	Stadium: Argos Municipal Stadium; Attendance: 11,150; Referee: Pagourtzis (Phthiotis)
Note: Match held at Argos due to AEK's punishment with stadium ban for incidents in the match against Aris.

15 February 1976 16	Kastoria	0–0	AEK Athens	Kastoria
14:30 EET (UTC+2)				Stadium: Municipal Stadium of Kastoria; Attendance: 5,994; Referee: Timoleon Latsios (Larissa)

22 February 1976 17	AEK Athens	2–0	Panionios	Nea Filadelfeia
15:00 EET (UTC+2)	Papaioannou 61', 62'			Stadium: AEK Stadium; Attendance: 17,948; Referee: Chiotakis (Thessaloniki)

29 February 1976 18	Panachaiki	0–3	AEK Athens	Patras
15:00 EET (UTC+2)	Spentzopoulos (yellow card) 37'		Wagner 57', 60'; Dedes 82'	Stadium: Panachaiki Stadium; Attendance: 14,967; Referee: Manolis Platopoulos (Athens)

7 March 1976 19	AEK Athens	1–1	Olympiacos	Nea Filadelfeia
15:00 EET (UTC+2)	Wagner 42'		Kritikopoulos 65'	Stadium: AEK Stadium; Attendance: 29,126; Referee: Vasilis Patarakis (Piraeus)

14 March 1976 20	AEK Athens	3–1	Apollon Athens	Nea Filadelfeia
15:30 EET (UTC+2)	Wagner 2'; Konstantinou 9', 88' (pen.)		Pathiakakis 73'	Stadium: AEK Stadium; Attendance: 14,766; Referee: Leonidas Vamvakopoulos (Athens)

21 March 1976 21	Iraklis	0–1	AEK Athens	Thessaloniki
15:30 EET (UTC+2)			Dedes 52'	Stadium: Kaftanzoglio Stadium; Attendance: 29,333; Referee: Karistinakis (Athens)

28 March 1976 22	AEK Athens	5–1	Atromitos	Nea Filadelfeia
15:30 EEST (UTC+3)	Nikolaou 28'; Dedes 40', 56'; Wagner 65'; Ardizoglou 72'		Pantelidis 23'; Kotsalos (yellow card) 58'	Stadium: AEK Stadium; Attendance: 19,350; Referee: Chiotakis (Thessaloniki)

4 April 1976 23	Ethnikos Piraeus	3–4	AEK Athens	Piraeus
15:30 EEST (UTC+3)	Ravousis 31' (o.g.); Filakouris (penalty missed) 48'; Kritikos (red card) 64'; Stamatakis 73'; Koureas 75'		Konstantinou 59' (pen.), 70'; Ardizoglou 63'; Papaioannou 74'	Stadium: Karaiskakis Stadium; Attendance: 32,790; Referee: Karkatsoulis (Thessaloniki)

11 April 1976 24	AEK Athens	0–1	Panathinaikos	Nea Filadelfeia
17:00 EEST (UTC+3)	Ardizoglou (red card) 72'		Vlachos (yellow card) 5', (goal) 60'; Panopoulos (yellow card) 80'	Stadium: AEK Stadium; Attendance: 29,010; Referee: Giorgos Katsoras (Thessaloniki)

18 April 1976 25	Aris	1–0	AEK Athens	Thessaloniki
17:00 EEST (UTC+3)	Stavridis 62'		Nikolaou (yellow card) 57'	Stadium: Aris Stadium; Attendance: 20,850; Referee: Leonidas Panagopoulos (Athens)

26 April 1976 26	AEK Athens	4–0	Panetolikos	Nea Filadelfeia
17:00 EEST (UTC+3)	Dedes 15', 36', (penalty missed) 48'; Wagner 18'; Papaioannou 80'			Stadium: AEK Stadium; Attendance: 9,463; Referee: Thomaidis (Piraeus)

2 May 1976 27	PAOK	1–0	AEK Athens	Thessaloniki
17:00 EEST (UTC+3)	Sarafis (penalty missed) 18'; Guerino 89'			Stadium: Toumba Stadium; Attendance: 45,010; Referee: Stathis Papavasiliou (Piraeus)

9 May 1976 28	Panserraikos	0–0	AEK Athens	Serres
17:00 EEST (UTC+3)				Stadium: Serres Municipal Stadium; Attendance: 2,303; Referee: Giannis Tsionas (Larissa)

16 May 1976 29	AEK Athens	5–0	Pierikos	Nea Filadelfeia
17:30 EEST (UTC+3)	Dedes 29', 47' (pen.), 59'; Ardizoglou 70'; M. Papaioannou 80'			Stadium: AEK Stadium; Attendance: 4,699; Referee: Giorgos Petropoulos (Athens)

23 May 1976 30	PAS Giannina	2–0	AEK Athens	Ioannina
17:30 EEST (UTC+3)	Álvarez 4'; Grammeniatis 88'			Stadium: Zosimades Stadium; Attendance: 6,225; Referee: Dimitris Pantzalis (Piraeus)

=== Greek Cup ===
==== Matches ====
2 November 1975 First round	AEK Athens	7–0	Agios Dimitrios	Nea Filadelfeia
14:30 EET (UTC+2)	Wagner 7', 75'; Dedes 10'; Tsamis 32'; Papaioannou 40', 50', 71'		Katsirmas (penalty missed) 66'	Stadium: AEK Stadium; Referee: Giorgos Moschopoulos (Thessaloniki)

8 February 1976 Second round	AEK Athens	2–1	Anagennisi Karditsa	Nea Filadelfeia
14:30 EET (UTC+2)	Ardizoglou 2', 35'	Report	Krommidas 64'	Stadium: AEK Stadium; Attendance: 4,081; Referee: Giannis Tsionas (Larissa)

10 March 1976 Round of 16	AEK Athens	6–0	Olympiakos Neon Liosion	Nea Filadelfeia
14:30 EET (UTC+2)	Dedes 22', 63'; Ardizoglou 34', 70', 86'; Wagner 36'			Stadium: AEK Stadium; Attendance: 4,824; Referee: Dimitris Protonotarios (Athens)

21 April 1976 Quarter-finals	Fostiras	0–1	AEK Athens	Tavros
16:30 EEST (UTC+3)			Konstantinou 16', (penalty missed) 72'	Stadium: Tavros Stadium; Referee: Nikos Zlatanos (Thessaloniki)

12 May 1976 Semi-finals	AEK Athens	2–3	Olympiacos	Nea Filadelfeia
17:00 EEST (UTC+3)	Dedes (yellow card) , (goal) 9'; Tsamis (yellow card); Ravousis (yellow card) 23'; Konstantinou 74' (pen.)	Report	Losada (yellow card) 10'; Davourlis (yellow card) 13', (goal) 77' (pen.); Galakos 64', 89'	Stadium: AEK Stadium; Attendance: 30,000; Referee: Giorgos Katsoras (Thessaloniki)

=== UEFA Cup ===
==== First round ====
17 September 1975 First leg	Vojvodina (Socialist Federal Republic of Yugoslavia)	0–0	(Greece) AEK Athens	Novi Sad, Yugoslavia
19:30 EEST (UTC+3)		Report	Nikolaou (yellow card) 60'	Stadium: Karađorđe Stadium; Attendance: 7,800; Referee: Heinz Einbeck (East Germany)

1 October 1975 Second leg	AEK Athens (Greece)	3–1 (3–1 agg.)	(Socialist Federal Republic of Yugoslavia) Vojvodina	Athens, Greece
21:00 EEST (UTC+3)	Papaioannou 41'; Papadopoulos 60'; Wagner 71'	Report	Ivezić (yellow card) 62'; Rutonjski 89'	Stadium: AEK Stadium; Attendance: 27,541; Referee: Pavel Kazakov (Soviet Union)

==== Second round ====
22 October 1975 First leg	Inter Bratislava (Czechoslovakia)	2–0	(Greece) AEK Athens	Bratislava, Czechoslovakia
	Luprich 36' (pen.); Mráz 81'	Report		Stadium: Tehelné pole Attendance: 8,120; Referee: John Gordon (Scotland)

5 November 1975 Second leg	AEK Athens (Greece)	3–1 (3–3(a) agg.)	(Czechoslovakia) Inter Bratislava	Athens, Greece
19:30 EET (UTC+2)	Konstantinou 58', 60' (pen.); Wagner 74'	Report	Novotný 1'	Stadium: AEK Stadium; Attendance: 25,023; Referee: Milivoje Gugulović (Yugoslavia)

== Statistics ==
=== Squad statistics ===
As of 23 May 1976

No.	Pos	Player	Alpha Ethniki		Greek Cup		UEFA Cup		Total	
No.	Pos	Player	Apps	Goals	Apps	Goals	Apps	Goals	Apps	Goals
Goalkeepers
—	GK	(Kingdom of Greece) Giorgos Sidiropoulos	22	0	3	0	1	0	26	0
—	GK	(Kingdom of Greece) Lakis Stergioudas	9	0	3	0	3	0	15	0
Defenders
—	DF	(Kingdom of Greece) Giorgos Skrekis	16	1	0	0	3	0	19	1
—	DF	(Kingdom of Greece) Spyros Stefanidis	2	0	1	0	0	0	3	0
—	DF	(Kingdom of Greece) Apostolos Toskas	23	0	5	0	4	0	32	0
—	DF	(Kingdom of Greece) Lakis Nikolaou	29	3	4	0	4	0	37	3
—	DF	(Kingdom of Greece) Sakis Zarzopoulos	5	0	2	0	2	0	9	0
—	DF	(Kingdom of Greece) Stefanos Theodoridis	22	0	5	0	3	0	30	0
—	DF	(Kingdom of Greece) Nikos Karoulias	0	0	0	0	0	0	0	0
—	DF	(Kingdom of Greece) Petros Ravousis	18	0	2	0	1	0	21	0
Midfielders
—	MF	(Kingdom of Greece) Giorgos Lavaridis	0	0	0	0	0	0	0	0
—	MF	(West Germany) Timo Zahnleiter	27	3	5	0	1	0	33	3
—	MF	(Cyprus) Takis Timotheou	2	0	0	0	0	0	2	0
—	MF	(Kingdom of Greece) Lazaros Papadopoulos	18	0	3	0	4	1	25	1
—	MF	(Kingdom of Greece) Dionysis Tsamis	30	0	5	1	4	0	39	1
—	MF	(Kingdom of Greece) Christos Ardizoglou	25	5	4	5	0	0	29	10
Forwards
—	FW	(Kingdom of Greece) Mimis Papaioannou	30	11	4	3	4	1	38	15
—	FW	(Kingdom of Greece) Georgios Dedes	27	15	5	4	4	0	36	19
—	FW	(West Germany) Walter Wagner	27	11	5	3	4	2	36	16
—	FW	(Cyprus) Tasos Konstantinou	24	8	4	2	4	2	32	12

=== Goalscorers ===
As of 23 May 1976
The list is sorted by competition order when total goals are equal, then by position and then alphabetically by surname.

Rank	Pos.	Player	Alpha Ethniki	Greek Cup	UEFA Cup	Total
1	FW	(Greece) Georgios Dedes	15	4	0	19
2	FW	(West Germany) Walter Wagner	11	3	2	16
3	FW	(Greece) Mimis Papaioannou	11	3	1	15
4	FW	(Cyprus) Tasos Konstantinou	8	2	2	12
5	MF	(Greece) Christos Ardizoglou	5	5	0	10
6	DF	(Greece) Lakis Nikolaou	3	0	0	3
6	MF	(West Germany) Timo Zahnleiter	3	0	0	3
8	DF	(Greece) Giorgos Skrekis	1	0	0	1
8	MF	(Greece) Dionysis Tsamis	0	1	0	1
8	MF	(Greece) Lazaros Papadopoulos	0	0	1	1
Own goals			0	0	0	0
Totals			57	18	6	81

=== Hat-tricks ===
Numbers in superscript represent the goals that the player scored.

Player	Against	Result	Date	Competition	Source
(Greece) Georgios Dedes	(Greece) Kastoria	4–0 (H)	5 October 1975	Alpha Ethniki	
(Greece) Mimis Papaioannou	(Greece) Agios Dimitrios	7–0 (H)	2 November 1975	Greek Cup	
(Greece) Christos Ardizoglou	(Greece) Olympiakos Neon Liosion	6–1 (H)	10 March 1976	Greek Cup	
(Greece) Georgios Dedes	(Greece) Pierikos	5–0 (H)	16 May 1976	Alpha Ethniki	

=== Clean sheets ===
As of 23 May 1976
The list is sorted by competition order when total clean sheets are equal and then alphabetically by surname. Clean sheets in games where both goalkeepers participated are awarded to the goalkeeper who started the game. Goalkeepers with no appearances are not included.

Rank	Player	Alpha Ethniki	Greek Cup	UEFA Cup	Total
1	(Greece) Giorgos Sidiropoulos	14	1	0	15
2	(Greece) Lakis Stergioudas	3	2	1	6
Totals		17	3	1	21

=== Disciplinary record ===
As of 23 May 1976

N	P	Nat.	Name	Alpha Ethniki			Greek Cup			UEFA Cup			Total			Notes
N	P	Nat.	Name	Yellow card	Second yellow card	Red card	Yellow card	Second yellow card	Red card	Yellow card	Second yellow card	Red card	Yellow card	Second yellow card	Red card	Notes
Goalkeepers
—	GK	(Kingdom of Greece)	Giorgos Sidiropoulos													
—	GK	(Kingdom of Greece)	Lakis Stergioudas													
Defenders
—	DF	(Kingdom of Greece)	Giorgos Skrekis													
—	DF	(Kingdom of Greece)	Spyros Stefanidis	1									1			
—	DF	(Kingdom of Greece)	Apostolos Toskas													
—	DF	(Kingdom of Greece)	Lakis Nikolaou	2						1			3			
—	DF	(Kingdom of Greece)	Sakis Zarzopoulos													
—	DF	(Kingdom of Greece)	Stefanos Theodoridis													
—	DF	(Kingdom of Greece)	Nikos Karoulias													
—	DF	(Kingdom of Greece)	Petros Ravousis				1						1			
Midfielders
—	MF	(Kingdom of Greece)	Giorgos Lavaridis													
—	MF	(West Germany)	Timo Zahnleiter													
—	MF	(Cyprus)	Takis Timotheou													
—	MF	(Kingdom of Greece)	Lazaros Papadopoulos	1									1			
—	MF	(Kingdom of Greece)	Dionysis Tsamis				1						1			
—	MF	(Kingdom of Greece)	Christos Ardizoglou			1									1	
Forwards
—	FW	(Kingdom of Greece)	Mimis Papaioannou													
—	FW	(Kingdom of Greece)	Georgios Dedes				1						1			
—	FW	(West Germany)	Walter Wagner	1									1			
—	FW	(Cyprus)	Tasos Konstantinou													

=== Starting 11 ===
This section presents the most frequently used formation along with the players with the most starts across all competitions.

N.	Formation	Matchday(s)
39	4–4–2	1–34

Nat.	Player	Pos.
(Greece)	Giorgos Sidiropoulos	GK
(Greece)	Apostolos Toskas	RCB
(Greece)	Lakis Nikolaou	LCB
(Greece)	Stefanos Theodoridis	RB
(West Germany)	Timo Zahnleiter	LB
(Greece)	Dionysis Tsamis	DM
(Greece)	Christos Ardizoglou	CM
(Cyprus)	Tasos Konstantinou	RM
(Greece)	Georgios Dedes	LM
(West Germany)	Walter Wagner	RCF
(Greece)	Mimis Papaioannou (C)	LCF

Last updated: 1976-05-23

== Awards ==
Player	Pos.	Award	Source
(Greece) Georgios Dedes	FW	Alpha Ethniki Top Scorer	
(Greece) Christos Ardizoglou	MF	Greek Cup Top Scorer (shared)	
