= 1969–70 AEK Athens F.C. season =

AEK Athens
1969–70 season
- Chairman: Georgios Chrysafidis (until 24 June); Kosmas Chatzicharalampous
- Manager: Branko Stanković
- Stadium: AEK Stadium
- Alpha Ethniki: 2nd
- Greek Cup: Second round
- Top goalscorer: League: Mimis Papaioannou (18); All: Mimis Papaioannou (19)
- Highest home attendance: 30,084 vs Panathinaikos (22 October 1969)
- Lowest home attendance: 4,484 vs Vyzas Megara (8 March 1970)
- Average home league attendance: 14,192
- Biggest win: AEK Athens 6–1 Pierikos
- Biggest defeat: PAOK 4–0 AEK Athens
Home colours	Away colours

The 1969–70 season was the 46th season in the existence of AEK Athens F.C. and the 11th consecutive season in the top flight of Greek football. They competed in the Alpha Ethniki and the Greek Cup. The season began on 21 September 1969 and finished on 7 June 1970.

== Kits ==
Home	Away

== Overview ==
This was AEK's second consecutive transitional season under Branko Stanković. The yellow-blacks underwent a major squad rebuild. Promising players such as Stefanos Theodoridis and Kostas Triantafyllou were promoted from the academy, while transfers of young and talented players were made, with the most notable being Apostolos Toskas. Nevertheless, in the final days of the transfer window, the club also signed Andreas Papaemmanouil, who was sidelined at Panathinaikos. At the same time, players who had made a significant contribution to the club, such as Alekos Sofianidis, Aleko Yordan and most notably their long-serving captain, Andreas Stamatiadis left the club. Moreover, Stanković no longer considered the previous years' main centre backs, Tasos Vasiliou and Fotis Balopoulos, part of his plans, effectively ending their time at the club.

This season the team did not compete in any European competitions. The second-place finish in the league was considered a success, taking into account the circumstances and the strength of Panathinaikos at the time. Mimis Papaioannou emerged as the club's top scorer with 18 goals and second in the league behind Antonis Antoniadis, while Kostas Nikolaidis and Panagiotis Ventouris also finished among the league's top scorers with 12 goals each. This season was marked by the bribery scandal of Loukanidis and Syropoulos of Aris by people of the newly-promoted Panachaiki. The evidence against them was considered overwhelming, and the verdict was issued immediately. Thus, despite the 0–0 draw at Aris Stadium, the match was awarded to Aris with 2–0, and Panachaiki were eliminated from the league and they were zeroed in their remaining 13 matches. As was natural, the club of Patras finished last and were relegated. It was the first time in the history of Greek football that a club was relegated due to bribery.

In the Cup, AEK qualified without a match in the second round, where they faced Panathinaikos in a single game at Nea Filadelfeia Stadium and after 120 minutes the score was 1–1. The match went to a penalty shoot-out, with the procedure being introduced for the first time, as until then ties had been decided by a draw. AEK lost 5–3 on penalties, as Papaioannou and Ventouris sent the ball out.

== Management team ==
Position	Staff
Manager	(Socialist Federal Republic of Yugoslavia) Branko Stanković
Assistant manager	(Greece) Giorgos Gasparis
Assistant manager	(Socialist Federal Republic of Yugoslavia) Simo Vilic
Technical director	(Greece) Kleanthis Maropoulos
Academy director	(Greece) Georgios Daispangos
Academy manager	(Greece) Georgios Daispangos

== Players ==
=== Squad information ===
NOTE: The players are the ones that have been announced by the AEK Athens' press release. No edits should be made unless a player arrival or exit is announced. Updated 7 June 1970, 23:59 UTC+2.

Player	Nat.	Position(s)	Date of birth (Age)	Signed	Previous club	Transfer fee	Contract until
Goalkeepers
Stelios Serafidis	(Greece)	GK	6 August 1935 (aged 34)	1953	(Greece) AEK Athens U20	—	1976
Stelios Konstantinidis	(Greece)	GK	6 June 1947 (aged 23)	1967	(Greece) AEK Athens U20	—	1976
Defenders
Tasos Vasiliou	(Greece)	CB	4 August 1938 (aged 31)	1965	(Greece) Apollon Athens	₯1,200,000	1976
Giorgos Kefalidis	(Greece)	RB / CB	21 March 1941 (aged 29)	1964	(Greece) Pierikos	₯800,000	1976
Fotis Balopoulos	(Greece)	CB / DM / CM / ST	17 December 1943 (aged 26)	1964	(Greece) Proodeftiki	₯450,000	1976
Giannis Spyropoulos	(Greece)	CB / RB	1945 (aged 24–25)	1968	(Greece) PAO Patisia	Free	1976
Giannis Stavrou	(Greece)	RB / LB / CB	6 January 1947 (aged 23)	1967	(Greece) AEK Athens U20	—	1976
Apostolos Toskas	(Greece)	CB	28 December 1947 (aged 22)	1969	(Greece) Trikala	₯1,500,000	1977
Nikos Karapoulitidis	(Greece)	LB / RB / CB	30 November 1948 (aged 21)	1968	(Greece) AEK Athens U20	—	1976
Kostas Triantafyllou	(Greece)	CB / RB / LB / DM	1950 (aged 19–20)	1969	(Greece) AEK Athens U20	—	1977
Stefanos Theodoridis	(Greece)	RB / LB / CB / RM / LM	19 June 1950 (aged 20)	1969	(Greece) AEK Athens U20	—	1977
Midfielders
Stelios Skevofilakas (Captain)	(Greece)	LM / RM / AM / CM	6 January 1939 (aged 31)	1961	(Greece) Eleftheroupoli	Free	1976
Panagiotis Ventouris	(Greece)	LM / RM / LW / RW / ST / AM / SS	1 March 1943 (aged 27)	1965	(Greece) Fostiras	₯400,000	1976
Nikos Stathopoulos	(Greece)	LM / LB / CM	8 November 1943 (aged 26)	1966	(Greece) AEK Athens U20	—	1976
Minas Stavridis	(Greece)	AM / SS / ST	13 April 1945 (aged 25)	1968	(Greece) Ionikos	₯200,000	1976
Giorgos Karafeskos	(Greece)	CM / DM / RM / RW	8 December 1946 (aged 23)	1965	(Greece) AEK Athens U20	—	1976
Giorgos Lavaridis	(Greece)	CM / DM / CB	15 October 1947 (aged 22)	1968	(Greece) AEK Athens U20	—	1976
Forwards
Andreas Papaemmanouil	(Greece)	RW / LW / RM / LM / SS / AM / CM	18 February 1939 (aged 31)	1969	(Greece) Panathinaikos	Free	1977
Mimis Papaioannou (Vice-captain)	(Greece)	SS / ST / AM / RW	17 November 1942 (aged 27)	1962	(Greece) Veria	₯175,000	1976
Spyros Pomonis	(Greece)	LW / LM	12 February 1944 (aged 26)	1960	(Greece) AEK Athens U20	—	1976
Kostas Nikolaidis	(Greece)	RW / LW / SS / ST	10 September 1944 (aged 25)	1965	(Greece) PAO Safraboli	₯400,000	1976
Kosmas Pesiridis	(Greece)	RW / LW	30 October 1947 (aged 22)	1968	(Greece) AON Argyroupoli	₯350,000	1976
Kostas Chanios	(Greece)	LW / SS	1947 (aged 22–23)	1969	(Greece) Levadiakos	₯300,000	1977
Kostas Sarris	(Greece)	LW / LM	1949 (aged 20–21)	1969	(Greece) AEK Athens U20	—	1977
Giorgos Kachris	(Greece)	RW / LW / RM / LM	1949 (aged 20–21)	1969	(Greece) Amyna Ampelokipoi	₯200,000	1977
Dimitris Palasidis	(Greece)	ST / RW / LW	1950 (aged 19–20)	1969	(Greece) Lefkada Imathias	₯150,000	1978
Panagiotis Psychogios	(Greece)	ST	23 December 1950 (aged 19)	1969	(Greece) AEK Athens U20	—	1977
Left during season
Lakis Frogoudakis	(Greece)	LB / RB / CB / DM	1944 (aged 25–26)	1964	(Greece) AEK Athens U20	—	1976

== Transfers ==
=== In ===
Pos.	Player	From	Fee	Date	Contract Until	Source
DF	(Greece) Apostolos Toskas	(Greece) Trikala	₯1,500,000	12 July 1969	30 June 1977	
DF	(Greece) Kostas Triantafyllou	(Greece) AEK Athens U20	Promotion	14 October 1969	30 June 1977	
DF	(Greece) Stefanos Theodoridis	(Greece) AEK Athens U20	Promotion	15 September 1969	30 June 1977	
FW	(Greece) Andreas Papaemmanouil	(Greece) Panathinaikos	Free transfer	2 October 1969	30 June 1977	
FW	(Greece) Giorgos Kachris	(Greece) Amyna Ampelokipoi	₯200,000	19 July 1969	30 June 1977	
FW	(Greece) Kostas Chanios	(Greece) Levadiakos	₯300,000	28 July 1969	30 June 1977	
FW	(Greece) Kostas Sarris	(Greece) AEK Athens U20	Promotion	15 September 1969	30 June 1977	
FW	(Greece) Nikos Sevastopoulos	(South Africa) Hellenic	Loan return	15 September 1969	30 June 1976	
FW	(Greece) Dimitris Palasidis	(Greece) Lefkada Imathias	₯150,000	2 September 1969	30 June 1978	
FW	(Greece) Panagiotis Psychogios	(Greece) AEK Athens U20	Promotion	15 September 1969	30 June 1977	

=== Out ===
Pos.	Player	To	Fee	Date	Source
GK	(Greece) Theodoros Maniateas	Retired		15 September 1969	
GK	(Greece) Giannis Kokkinos	(Greece) AEK Athens U20	Demotion	15 September 1969	
DF	(Turkey) Aleko Yordan	(Greece) Egaleo	Contract termination	20 August 1969	
DF	(Greece) Christos Antonopoulos	(Greece) Vyzas Megara	Contract termination	24 September 1969	
DF	(Greece) Alekos Sofianidis	(Greece) Panachaiki	Free transfer	31 July 1969	
DF	(Greece) Lakis Frogoudakis	Retired		26 December 1969	
MF	(Greece) Michalis Simigdalas	(Greece) Apollon Athens	Free transfer	29 September 1969	
FW	(Greece) Andreas Stamatiadis	Retired		1 July 1969	
FW	(Greece) Nikos Sevastopoulos	(Greece) Vyzas Megara	Contract termination	24 September 1969	
FW	(Greece) Kostas Papageorgiou	(Greece) Apollon Athens	Free transfer	31 July 1969	
FW	(Greece) Nikos Exarchidis	(Greece) Vyzas Megara	Contract termination	19 September 1969	
FW	(Greece) Dimitris Kyrmizas	(Greece) Vyzas Megara	Contract termination	24 September 1969	
FW	(Greece) Andreas Karakidis	(Greece) Fostiras	Contract termination	30 September 1969	

=== Overall transfer activity ===
Expenditure: ▼ ₯2,150,000

Income: ▲ ₯0

Net Total: ▼ ₯2,150,000

== Pre-season and friendlies ==
6 September 1969 Friendly	AEK Athens	2–0	Elpis Nea Ionia	Nea Filadelfeia
15:45 EET (UTC+2)	Exarchidis 2'; Pesiridis 45'	Report		Stadium: AEK Stadium; Attendance: 5,000; Referee: Thomas Kaladamis (Athens)
Note: 70-minute match (35-minute halves).

6 September 1969 Friendly	AEK Athens	4–0	Panerythraikos	Nea Filadelfeia
17:45 EET (UTC+2)	Kachris 11', 63'; Papaioannou 39', 57'	Report		Stadium: AEK Stadium; Attendance: 5,000; Referee: Christos Kougias (Athens)
Note: The second half lasted 30 minutes. After the fourth goal of the match Skevofilakas was injured and AEK ended the game with 10 players.

10 September 1969 Friendly	AEK Athens	2–2	Agia Paraskevi	Nea Filadelfeia
16:45 EET (UTC+2)	Kyrmizas 40'; Pomonis 80'	Report	Giannakopoulos 35'; Nikitakis 81'	Stadium: AEK Stadium; Referee: Leonidas Vamvakopoulos (Athens)

11 September 1969 Friendly	Rodos	0–4	AEK Athens	Rhodes
		Report	Ventouris 30'; Papaioannou 40'; Karafeskos 52'; Kachris 82'	Stadium: Diagoras Stadium; Attendance: 6,000; Referee: Kostas Xanthos (Dodecanese)

14 September 1969 Friendly	AEK Athens	5–1	Proodeftiki	Nea Filadelfeia
16:30 EET (UTC+2)	Kachris 5'; Papaioannou 24', 49', 68', 80'	Report	Vourdamis 39'	Stadium: AEK Stadium; Attendance: 10,000; Referee: Christos Michas (Athens)

17 September 1969 Friendly	AEK Athens	0–1	Chalkida	Nea Filadelfeia
16:30 EET (UTC+2)		Report	Koutsoukos (red card) 71'; Koutsoudakis 84'	Stadium: AEK Stadium; Attendance: 2,000; Referee: Dovas

21 September 1969 Friendly	Olympiacos Loutraki	1–4	AEK Athens	Loutraki
16:15 EET (UTC+2)	Mitrou 57'	Report	Nikolaidis 11'; Palasidis 12', 53', 70'	Stadium: Loutraki Municipal Stadium

24 September 1969 Friendly	AEK Athens	0–0	Ikaros Athens	Nea Filadelfeia
16:30 EET (UTC+2)		Report		Stadium: AEK Stadium; Referee: Kostas Levogiannis (Athens)

1 October 1969 Friendly	AEK Athens	3–0	Atromitos Piraeus	Nea Filadelfeia
16:15 EET (UTC+2)	Psychogios 6'; Nikolaidis 49'; Pesiridis 60'	Report		Stadium: AEK Stadium

5 October 1969 Friendly	Paniliakos	2–3	AEK Athens	Pyrgos
	Kalafas 58'; Sidirokastritis 80'	Report	Petridis 7'; Lavaridis 20'; Nikolaidis 48' (pen.)	Stadium: Pyrgos Stadium; Referee: Messinis

12 October 1969 Friendly	AEK Athens	4–2	Vyzas Megara	Nea Filadelfeia
15:30 EET (UTC+2)	Nikolaidis 36', 63'; Theodoridis 67'; Kachris 89'	Report	Kouvas 27', 44'	Stadium: AEK Stadium; Attendance: 6,637; Referee: Christos Karasoulas (Athens)

9 November 1969 Friendly	AEK Athens	4–1	OFI	Nea Filadelfeia
15:00 EET (UTC+2)	Pomonis 1'; Papaemmanouil 8'; Nikolaidis 35'; Ventouris 45'	Report	Themelis 40' (pen.)	Stadium: AEK Stadium; Referee: Tsitsopoulos

12 November 1969 Friendly	Panelefsiniakos	2–2	AEK Athens	Elefsina
	Papaspyrou 70'; Rotous 79'	Report	Kachris 68'; Pesiridis 89'	Stadium: Municipal Stadium of Elefsina

15 November 1969 Friendly	AEK Athens	3–2	Ethnikos Piraeus	Nea Filadelfeia
15:00 EET (UTC+2)	Karafeskos 6'; Sarris 11', 33'	Report	Leventakos 27' (pen.); Lavaridis 87' (o.g.)	Stadium: AEK Stadium; Referee: Pitsakos

28 January 1970 Friendly	Chalkida	1–2	AEK Athens	Chalcis
15:00 EET (UTC+2)	Tokpasidis 52'	Report	Papaioannou 77'; Theodoridis 85'	Stadium: Municipal Stadium of Chalkida; Referee: Gasparis (Chalkida)

10 February 1970 Friendly	Paniliakos	0–0	AEK Athens	Pyrgos
		Report		Stadium: Pyrgos Stadium; Attendance: 4,000; Referee: Daras

18 March 1970 Friendly	AEK Athens	8–1	Panerythraikos	Nea Filadelfeia
16:00 EET (UTC+2)	Skevofilakas 3'; Papaemmanouil 34'; Nikolaidis 38', 42'; Theodoridis 62', 65'; Palasidis 58', 76'	Report	Sideris 52' (pen.)	Stadium: AEK Stadium

25 March 1970 Friendly	Nea Artaki	2–4	AEK Athens	Nea Artaki
	Athanasiou 12'; Terkidazis 67'	Report	Theodoridis 4'; Palasidis 22', 33', 90'	Stadium: Nea Artaki Municipal Stadium; Attendance: 3,000; Referee: Koukouras

5 April 1970 Friendly	Aris Agios Konstantinos	2–3	AEK Athens	Agios Konstantinos
	Goal		Palasidis	Stadium: Municipal Stadium of Agios Konstantinos

1 May 1970 Friendly	AEK Athens	3–1	Apollon Athens	Nea Filadelfeia
	K. Sarris 8'; Palasidis 53'; Kachris 72'	Report	Papageorgiou (penalty missed) 13'; N. Simigdalas 23'	Stadium: AEK Stadium; Attendance: 15,000; Referee: Kontogiannis (Athens)

21 May 1970 Friendly	Anagennisi Karditsa	0–1	AEK Athens	Karditsa
		Report	Lavaridis 59'	Stadium: Municipal Stadium of Karditsa; Attendance: 6,000

9 June 1970 Friendly	AEK Athens	0–2	Panathinaikos	Nea Filadelfeia
17:30 EET (UTC+2)		Report	Deligiannis 31'; Chantzos 75'	Stadium: AEK Stadium; Attendance: 7,000; Referee: Leonidas Vamvakopoulos (Athens)
Note: Friendly match in honor of Kostas Nestoridis. Kostas Nestoridis, who had retired 2 years ago and Ferenc Puskás, who was the newly-signed manager of Panathinaikos, competed with AEK and Panathinaikos, respectivelly.

10 June 1970 Friendly	Korinthos	2–1	AEK Athens	Corinth
15:00 EET (UTC+2)	Karsiotis 27' (pen.), 33'	Report	Palasidis 43'	Stadium: Korinthos Stadium; Referee: Kostaras (Corinthia)

14 June 1970 Friendly	AO Koropi	v	AEK Athens	Koropi
17:30 EET (UTC+2)				Stadium: Antonis Priftis Stadium
Note: No match reports were found about the match.

=== OPAP Summer Championship ===
29 June 1969 1	Panionios	3–2	AEK Athens	Nea Smyrni
17:30 EET (UTC+2)	Kollias 31', 65'; Vlachos 80'	Report	Papageorgiou 25', 33'	Stadium: Nea Smyrni Stadium; Referee: Zois

6 July 1969 2	AEK Athens	0–0	Egaleo	Nea Filadelfeia
17:30 EET (UTC+2)		Report		Stadium: AEK Stadium; Referee: Moutsios

13 July 1969 3	Olympiacos	1–0	AEK Athens	Piraeus
20:30 EET (UTC+2)	Angelis 47'	Report		Stadium: Karaiskakis Stadium; Attendance: 7,000; Referee: Misailidis (Piraeus)

20 July 1969 4	AEK Athens	2–0	Veria	Nea Filadelfeia
17:30 EET (UTC+2)	Karakidis 38', 53'	Report		Stadium: AEK Stadium; Referee: Theodoros Tsanaklidis (Kavala)

3 August 1969 5	AEK Athens	1–0	Panionios	Nea Filadelfeia
17:30 EET (UTC+2)	Karakidis 83'	Report		Stadium: AEK Stadium; Attendance: 2,549; Referee: Manolis Platopoulos (Athens)

10 August 1969 6	Egaleo	0–0	AEK Athens	Aigaleo
17:15 EET (UTC+2)		Report		Stadium: Stavros Mavrothalassitis Stadium; Referee: Vougiouklakis (Piraeus)

17 August 1969 7	AEK Athens	0–0	Olympiacos	Nea Filadelfeia
17:15 EET (UTC+2)		Report		Stadium: AEK Stadium; Referee: Geroukalis (Athens)

24 August 1969 8	Veria	4–3	AEK Athens	Veria
17:00 EET (UTC+2)	Vamvelis 17', 65'; Serdaris 47'; K. Kefalidis 83'	Report	Pesiridis 46'; Stavridis 60'; Sarris 90+2'	Stadium: Veria Stadium; Referee: Pipergias (Macedonia)

14 September 1969 7th place play-off	AEK Athens	2–3 (a.e.t.)	Kavala	Larissa
15:45 EET (UTC+2)	Kyrmizas 10'; Psychogios 35'; Pomonis (red card) 104'	Report	Thalassinos 65'; Filippidis 70'; Charalampidis 94'; Pappas (red card) 104'	Stadium: Alcazar Stadium; Referee: Giorgos Katsoras (Thessaloniki)

== Competitions ==
=== Overall record ===
Competition	First match	Last match	Starting round	Final position	Record							
Competition	First match	Last match	Starting round	Final position	Pld	W	D	L	GF	GA	GD	Win %
Alpha Ethniki	21 September 1969	7 June 1970	Matchday 1	2nd	34	21	9	4	55	23	+32	61.76
Greek Cup	22 March 1970	22 March 1970	Second round	Second round	1	0	1	0	1	1	+0	0.00
Total					35	21	10	4	56	24	+32	60.00

Last updated: 7 June 1970
Source: Competitions

=== Alpha Ethniki ===
==== League table ====
Pos	Team	Pld	W	D	L	GF	GA	GD	Pts	Qualification or relegation
1	Panathinaikos (C)	34	27	5	2	69	15	+54	93	Qualification for European Cup first round
2	AEK Athens	34	21	9	4	55	23	+32	85	Invitation for Inter-Cities Fairs Cup first round
3	Olympiacos	34	21	8	5	52	21	+31	84	
4	Aris	34	20	7	7	47	15	+32	81	Qualification for Cup Winners' Cup first round
5	PAOK	34	12	17	5	52	25	+27	75	Invitation for Inter-Cities Fairs Cup first round

Source: RSSSF
Rules for classification: 1st points; 2nd decision match; 3rd head-to-head goal difference.
(C) Champions

==== Results summary ====
Overall								Home						Away					
Pld	W	D	L	GF	GA	GD	Pts	W	D	L	GF	GA	GD	W	D	L	GF	GA	GD
34	21	9	4	55	23	+32	85	14	2	1	36	9	+27	7	7	3	19	14	+5

Source: Competitive matches

==== Results by Matchday ====
Round	1	2	3	4	5	6	7	8	9	10	11	12	13	14	15	16	17	18	19	20	21	22	23	24	25	26	27	28	29	30	31	32	33	34
Ground	H	A	H	A	H	A	H	H	A	H	A	H	A	H	A	H	A	A	H	A	H	A	H	A	A	H	A	H	A	H	A	H	A	Η
Result	W	L	L	D	W	W	W	W	W	W	W	D	D	W	D	W	D	D	W	W	W	W	W	W	L	W	W	W	D	W	D	D	L	W
Position	1	8	12	11	8	5	4	4	4	3	3	3	3	3	4	4	4	4	3	2	2	2	2	2	3	2	2	2	2	2	2	2	2	2

Source: Competitive matches
A = Away; H = Home; W = Win; D = Draw; L = Loss; P = Postponed

==== Matches ====
21 September 1969 1	AEK Athens	3–1	Panionios	Nea Filadelfeia
16:15 EET (UTC+2)	Ventouris 25'; Papaioannou 51', 88'		Intzoglou 22'	Stadium: AEK Stadium; Attendance: 27,534; Referee: Christos Dilzas (Thessaloniki)

28 September 1969 2	Olympiacos	2–1	AEK Athens	Piraeus
16:15 EET (UTC+2)	Gioutsos 12'; Sideris 82' (pen.)		Karafeskos 30' (pen.)	Stadium: Karaiskakis Stadium; Attendance: 36,300; Referee: Christos Michas (Athens)

22 October 1969 3	AEK Athens	0–2	Panathinaikos	Nea Filadelfeia
			Grammos 50'; Dimitriou 56' (pen.)	Stadium: AEK Stadium; Attendance: 30,084; Referee: Leonidas Vamvakopoulos (Athens)
Note: The match was originally scheduled for 5 October, but was postponed due to the decision of the HFF for the matches that involved Greek international footballers to be rescheduled, in order to compete with the national team in the qualifiers of the World Cup that took place on 15 October.

19 October 1969 4	Pierikos	0–0	AEK Athens	Katerini
15:30 EET (UTC+2)				Stadium: Katerini Stadium; Attendance: 4,839; Referee: Pan Marinos (Piraeus)

26 October 1969 5	AEK Athens	2–0	Proodeftiki	Nea Filadelfeia
15:30 EET (UTC+2)	Ventouris 61'; Kachris 74'			Stadium: AEK Stadium; Attendance: 12,483; Referee: Geroukalis (Athens)

2 November 1969 6	Vyzas Megara	1–4	AEK Athens	Megara
15:15 EET (UTC+2)	Kouvas 57'		Ventouris 52'; Papaioannou 60'; Nikolaidis 70', 82'	Stadium: Megara Stadium; Attendance: 12,483; Referee: Perperidis

26 November 1969 7	AEK Athens	1–0	Aris	Nea Filadelfeia
	Papaioannou 3'; Karafeskos (penalty missed) 86'			Stadium: AEK Stadium; Attendance: 13,518; Referee: Kostas Xanthos (Dodecanese)
Note: The match was originally scheduled for 9 November, but was postponed due to the decision of the HFF, for the matches that involved Greek international footballers to be rescheduled, in order to compete with the national team in the qualifiers of the World Cup that took place on 16 November.

23 November 1969 8	AEK Athens	2–0	PAOK	Nea Filadelfeia
15:00 EET (UTC+2)	Nikolaidis 13'; Karafeskos 59'			Stadium: AEK Stadium; Attendance: 26,042; Referee: Dimitris Protonotarios (Athens)

30 November 1969 9	Panachaiki	0–2	AEK Athens	Patras
15:00 EET (UTC+2)	Kemenidis (red card) 86'		Ventouris 52'; Papaioannou 75'	Stadium: Panachaiki Stadium; Attendance: 13,424; Referee: Kostas Dikopoulos (Larissa)

7 December 1969 10	AEK Athens	2–1	Olympiacos Volos	Nea Filadelfeia
15:00 EET (UTC+2)	Papaioannou 44'; Nikolaidis 87'		Synetopoulos 70'	Stadium: AEK Stadium; Attendance: 13,374; Referee: Giarenis

13 December 1969 11	Olympiakos Nicosia	0–1	AEK Athens	Nicosia
15:00 EET (UTC+2)	Xypolitas (penalty missed) 21'		Nikolaidis 87' (pen.)	Stadium: GSP Stadium; Attendance: 3,200; Referee: Michalis Kyriakidis (Cyprus)

21 December 1969 12	AEK Athens	1–1	Egaleo	Nea Filadelfeia
15:00 EET (UTC+2)	Ventouris 68'		Kyriakidis 19'	Stadium: AEK Stadium; Attendance: 12,610; Referee: Nikos Zlatanos (Thessaloniki)

28 December 1969 13	OFI	0–0	AEK Athens	Heraklion
15:00 EET (UTC+2)				Stadium: Theodoros Vardinogiannis Stadium; Attendance: 7,798; Referee: Timoleon Latsios (Larissa)

4 January 1970 14	AEK Athens	1–0	Kavala	Nea Filadelfeia
15:00 EET (UTC+2)	Ventouris 77'			Stadium: AEK Stadium; Attendance: 11,279; Referee: Martinis (Thessaloniki)

11 January 1970 15	Ethnikos Piraeus	1–1	AEK Athens	Piraeus
15:00 EET (UTC+2)	Remoundos 47'		Papaioannou 75'	Stadium: Karaiskakis Stadium; Attendance: 28,581; Referee: Giorgos Katsoras (Thessaloniki)

18 January 1970 16	AEK Athens	2–0	Iraklis	Nea Filadelfeia
15:00 EET (UTC+2)	Nikolaidis 24'; Papaioannou 83'		Zacharopoulos (red card) 70'	Stadium: AEK Stadium; Attendance: 15,266; Referee: Kostas Dikopoulos (Larissa)

25 January 1970 17	Panserraikos	1–1	AEK Athens	Serres
	Tsakiris 48'		Papaioannou 58'	Stadium: Serres Municipal Stadium; Attendance: 5,852; Referee: Pyloridis

1 February 1970 18	Panionios	2–2	AEK Athens	Nea Smyrni
15:00 EET (UTC+2)	Intzoglou 26'; Karampinis 80'		Ventouris 2'; Papaioannou 52'	Stadium: Nea Smyrni Stadium; Attendance: 13,694; Referee: Timoleon Latsios (Larissa)

8 February 1970 19	AEK Athens	1–0	Olympiacos	Nea Filadelfeia
15:30 EET (UTC+2)	Papaioannou 29'			Stadium: AEK Stadium; Attendance: 29,672; Referee: Manolis Panakis (Athens)

15 February 1970 20	Panathinaikos	0–1	AEK Athens	Ampelokipoi
15:30 EET (UTC+2)			Pomonis 45'	Stadium: Leoforos Alexandras Stadium; Attendance: 22,968; Referee: Nikos Zlatanos (Thessaloniki)

22 February 1970 21	AEK Athens	6–1	Pierikos	Nea Filadelfeia
	Pomonis 14', 87'; Papaioannou 32', 68'; Nikolaidis 54'; Ventouris 62'		Pantazis 77'	Stadium: AEK Stadium; Attendance: 17,723; Referee: Giorgos Katsoras (Thessaloniki)

1 March 1970 22	Proodeftiki	0–2	AEK Athens	Piraeus
16:00 EET (UTC+2)			Ventouris 17'; Nikolaidis 75'	Stadium: Karaiskakis Stadium; Attendance: 19,138; Referee: Dimitris Protonotarios (Athens)

8 March 1970 23	AEK Athens	4–0	Vyzas Megara	Nea Filadelfeia
16:00 EET (UTC+2)	Nikolaidis 16'; Ventouris 52'; Papaioannou 65', 87'			Stadium: AEK Stadium; Attendance: 4,484; Referee: Moniakis (Heraklion)

15 March 1970 24	Aris	1–2	AEK Athens	Thessaloniki
	Alexiadis 82'		Ventouris 29'; Pomonis 34'	Stadium: Kaftanzoglio Stadium; Attendance: 14,640; Referee: Timoleon Latsios (Larissa)

29 March 1970 25	PAOK	4–0	AEK Athens	Thessaloniki
16:30 EET (UTC+2)	Sarafis 4' (pen.), 44'; Paridis 48'; Koudas 90'		Karafeskos (penalty missed) 52'	Stadium: Toumba Stadium; Attendance: 21,716; Referee: Stathis Papavasiliou (Piraeus)

5 April 1970 26	AEK Athens	2–0 (Awarded)	Panachaiki	Nea Filadelfeia
				Stadium: Nikos Goumas Stadium
Note: Awarded to AEK, since Panachaiki had been disqualified from the championship since Matchday 22, after having been adjudged guilty for attempted bribery of players of Aris.

12 April 1970 27	Olympiacos Volos	0–1	AEK Athens	Volos
16:30 EET (UTC+2)			Pomonis 48'	Stadium: Volos Municipal Stadium; Attendance: 6,395; Referee: Pyloridis

19 April 1970 28	AEK Athens	5–1	Olympiakos Nicosia	Nea Filadelfeia
16:30 EET (UTC+2)	Petridis 11' (o.g.); Nikolaidis 12', 28'; Ventouris 72'; Papaioannou 84'		Avraamidis 56'	Stadium: AEK Stadium; Attendance: 5,820; Referee: Charalampos Tsagarousianos (Patras)

4 May 1970 29	Egaleo	0–0	AEK Athens	Aigaleo
17:00 EET (UTC+2)				Stadium: Stavros Mavrothalassitis Stadium; Attendance: 6,255; Referee: Margaritis Doumousiadis (Magnesia)

11 May 1970 30	AEK Athens	3–2	OFI	Nea Filadelfeia
17:00 EET (UTC+2)	Nikolaidis 35'; Pomonis 42'; Papaemmanouil (penalty missed) 87', 87'		Baltatzis 52'; Vouzounerakis 65' (pen.)	Stadium: AEK Stadium; Referee: Dionysopoulos

17 May 1970 31	Kavala	0–0	AEK Athens	Kavala
17:30 EET (UTC+2)			Stathopoulos (red card) 85'	Stadium: Kavala National Stadium; Attendance: 11,926; Referee: Martinis (Thessaloniki)

24 May 1970 32	AEK Athens	0–0	Ethnikos Piraeus	Nea Filadelfeia
17:30 EET (UTC+2)				Stadium: AEK Stadium; Attendance: 10,041; Referee: Andreas Kouniaidis (Cyprus)

31 May 1970 33	Iraklis	2–1	AEK Athens	Thessaloniki
17:30 EET (UTC+2)	Kasapis 2', 36'		Papaioannou 10'	Stadium: Kaftanzoglio Stadium; Referee: Lepidas

7 June 1970 34	AEK Athens	1–0	Panserraikos	Nea Filadelfeia
17:30 EET (UTC+2)	Papaioannou 77'			Stadium: AEK Stadium; Referee: Manolis Platopoulos (Athens)

=== Greek Cup ===
AEK Athens qualified to the second round without a match.

==== Matches ====
22 March 1970 Second round	AEK Athens	1–1 (a.e.t.) (3–5 p)	Panathinaikos	Nea Filadelfeia
15:30 EET (UTC+2)	Papaioannou 2'		Antoniadis 44'	Stadium: AEK Stadium; Referee: Giorgos Katsoras (Thessaloniki)
	Penalties
	Nikolaidis (penalty scored); Papaioannou (penalty missed); Karafeskos (penalty scored); Ventouris (penalty missed); Stathopoulos (penalty scored)		(penalty scored) Dimitriou; (penalty scored) Athanasopoulos; (penalty scored) Domazos; (penalty scored) Filakouris; (penalty scored) Antoniadis

== Statistics ==
=== Squad statistics ===
As of 7 June 1970

No.	Pos	Player	Alpha Ethniki		Greek Cup		Total	
No.	Pos	Player	Apps	Goals	Apps	Goals	Apps	Goals
Goalkeepers
—	GK	(Kingdom of Greece) Stelios Serafidis	1	0	0	0	1	0
—	GK	(Kingdom of Greece) Stelios Konstantinidis	32	0	1	0	33	0
Defenders
—	DF	(Kingdom of Greece) Tasos Vasiliou	0	0	0	0	0	0
—	DF	(Kingdom of Greece) Giorgos Kefalidis	30	0	1	0	31	0
—	DF	(Kingdom of Greece) Fotis Balopoulos	0	0	0	0	0	0
—	DF	(Kingdom of Greece) Giannis Spyropoulos	1	0	0	0	1	0
—	DF	(Kingdom of Greece) Giannis Stavrou	0	0	0	0	0	0
—	DF	(Kingdom of Greece) Apostolos Toskas	32	0	1	0	33	0
—	DF	(Kingdom of Greece) Nikos Karapoulitidis	9	0	1	0	10	0
—	DF	(Kingdom of Greece) Kostas Triantafyllou	23	0	1	0	24	0
—	DF	(Kingdom of Greece) Stefanos Theodoridis	7	0	0	0	7	0
Midfielders
—	MF	(Kingdom of Greece) Stelios Skevofilakas	30	0	1	0	31	0
—	MF	(Kingdom of Greece) Panagiotis Ventouris	31	12	1	0	32	12
—	MF	(Kingdom of Greece) Nikos Stathopoulos	29	0	1	0	30	0
—	MF	(Kingdom of Greece) Minas Stavridis	1	0	0	0	1	0
—	MF	(Kingdom of Greece) Giorgos Karafeskos	31	2	1	0	32	2
—	MF	(Kingdom of Greece) Giorgos Lavaridis	18	0	0	0	18	0
Forwards
—	FW	(Kingdom of Greece) Andreas Papaemmanouil	17	1	1	0	18	1
—	FW	(Kingdom of Greece) Mimis Papaioannou	32	18	1	1	33	19
—	FW	(Kingdom of Greece) Spyros Pomonis	24	6	1	0	25	6
—	FW	(Kingdom of Greece) Kostas Nikolaidis	25	12	1	0	26	12
—	FW	(Kingdom of Greece) Kostas Chanios	1	0	0	0	1	0
—	FW	(Kingdom of Greece) Kostas Sarris	8	0	0	0	8	0
—	FW	(Kingdom of Greece) Giorgos Kachris	17	1	0	0	17	1
—	FW	(Kingdom of Greece) Dimitris Palasidis	3	0	0	0	3	0
—	FW	(Kingdom of Greece) Panagiotis Psychogios	1	0	0	0	1	0
Left during season
—	DF	(Kingdom of Greece) Lakis Frogoudakis	11	0	0	0	11	0

=== Goalscorers ===
As of 7 June 1970
The list is sorted by competition order when total goals are equal, then by position and then alphabetically by surname.

Rank	Pos.	Player	Alpha Ethniki	Greek Cup	Total
1	FW	(Greece) Mimis Papaioannou	18	1	19
2	MF	(Greece) Panagiotis Ventouris	12	0	12
2	FW	(Greece) Kostas Nikolaidis	12	0	12
4	FW	(Greece) Spyros Pomonis	6	0	6
5	MF	(Greece) Giorgos Karafeskos	2	0	2
6	FW	(Greece) Andreas Papaemmanouil	1	0	1
6	FW	(Greece) Giorgos Kachris	1	0	1
Own goals			1	0	1
Totals			53	1	54

=== Clean sheets ===
As of 7 June 1970
The list is sorted by competition order when total clean sheets are equal and then alphabetically by surname. Clean sheets in games where both goalkeepers participated are awarded to the goalkeeper who started the game. Goalkeepers with no appearances are not included.

Rank	Player	Alpha Ethniki	Greek Cup	Total
1	(Greece) Stelios Konstantinidis	18	0	18
2	(Greece) Stelios Serafidis	0	0	0
Totals		18	0	18

=== Disciplinary record ===
As of 7 June 1970

N	P	Nat.	Name	Alpha Ethniki			Greek Cup			Total			Notes
N	P	Nat.	Name	Yellow card	Second yellow card	Red card	Yellow card	Second yellow card	Red card	Yellow card	Second yellow card	Red card	Notes
Goalkeepers
—	GK	(Kingdom of Greece)	Stelios Serafidis										
—	GK	(Kingdom of Greece)	Stelios Konstantinidis										
Defenders
—	DF	(Kingdom of Greece)	Tasos Vasiliou										
—	DF	(Kingdom of Greece)	Giorgos Kefalidis										
—	DF	(Kingdom of Greece)	Fotis Balopoulos										
—	DF	(Kingdom of Greece)	Giannis Spyropoulos										
—	DF	(Kingdom of Greece)	Giannis Stavrou										
—	DF	(Kingdom of Greece)	Apostolos Toskas										
—	DF	(Kingdom of Greece)	Nikos Karapoulitidis										
—	DF	(Kingdom of Greece)	Kostas Triantafyllou										
—	DF	(Kingdom of Greece)	Stefanos Theodoridis										
Midfielders
—	MF	(Kingdom of Greece)	Stelios Skevofilakas										
—	MF	(Kingdom of Greece)	Panagiotis Ventouris										
—	MF	(Kingdom of Greece)	Nikos Stathopoulos			1						1	
—	MF	(Kingdom of Greece)	Minas Stavridis										
—	MF	(Kingdom of Greece)	Giorgos Karafeskos										
—	MF	(Kingdom of Greece)	Giorgos Lavaridis										
Forwards
—	FW	(Kingdom of Greece)	Andreas Papaemmanouil										
—	FW	(Kingdom of Greece)	Mimis Papaioannou										
—	FW	(Kingdom of Greece)	Spyros Pomonis										
—	FW	(Kingdom of Greece)	Kostas Nikolaidis										
—	FW	(Kingdom of Greece)	Kostas Chanios										
—	FW	(Kingdom of Greece)	Kostas Sarris										
—	FW	(Kingdom of Greece)	Giorgos Kachris										
—	FW	(Kingdom of Greece)	Dimitris Palasidis										
—	FW	(Kingdom of Greece)	Panagiotis Psychogios										
Left during season
—	DF	(Kingdom of Greece)	Lakis Frogoudakis										

=== Starting 11 ===
This section presents the most frequently used formation along with the players with the most starts across all competitions.

N.	Formation	Matchday(s)
35	4–2–4	1–34

Nat.	Player	Pos.
(Greece)	Stelios Konstantinidis	GK
(Greece)	Apostolos Toskas	RCB
(Greece)	Kostas Triantafyllou	LCB
(Greece)	Giorgos Kefalidis	RB
(Greece)	Nikos Stathopoulos	LB
(Greece)	Giorgos Karafeskos	RCM
(Greece)	Stelios Skevofilakas (C)	LCM
(Greece)	Panagiotis Ventouris	RW
(Greece)	Spyros Pomonis	LW
(Greece)	Mimis Papaioannou	RCF
(Greece)	Kostas Nikolaidis	LCF

Last updated: 1970-06-07
