= Vassilis Stravopodis =

Greek footballer

Personal information
- Date of birth: 1948 (age 77–78)
- Place of birth: Patras, Greece
- Height: 1.76 m (5 ft 9 in)
- Position: Midfielder

Youth career
- 1965–1968: Olympiakos Patras

Senior career*
Years	Team	Apps	(Gls)
1968–1979	Panachaiki	228	(17)

International career
1974	Greece	2	(0)
- * Club domestic league appearances and goals

The first version of this article has been based in the text of el:Βασίλης Στραβοπόδης of the Greek Wikipedia published under GFDL.

Vassilis Stravopodis (Greek: Βασίλης Στραβοπόδης; born 1948), popularly nicknamed The Wizard, is a former Greek footballer (midfielder) born in Patras. One of the most gifted midfielders of his generation, he was a member of the great Panachaiki football team that impressed Greece in the 1970s and qualified to the 1974 UEFA Cup.

After the end of his professional career, Stravopodis remained in Panachaiki as a valuable member of its organisation. He has been the junior team's coach for several years and has coached the senior team for some months in 2006.

== Statistics ==
Vassilis Stravopodis had 228 First Division appearances with Panachaiki and scored 17 goals.

== Appearances for the Greece national football team ==
- 1. 15 May 1974 Poland - Greece 2–0 (starter 45') - friendly match
- 2. 1974 Roumania - Greece 3–1 (substitute 75') - Balkan Cup
