= Giorgos Sidiropoulos =

Greek footballer (1949–2015)

- Giorgos Sidiropoulos

Personal information
- Full name: Georgios Sidiropoulos
- Date of birth: 25 June 1949
- Place of birth: Elassona, Greece
- Date of death: 31 December 2015 (aged 66)
- Place of death: Germany
- Height: 1.80 m (5 ft 11 in)
- Position: Goalkeeper

Youth career
- –1968: PO Elassona

Senior career*
| Years | Team | Apps | (Gls) |
| 1968–1970 | AO Trikala | 8^{[a]} | (0^{[a]}) |
| 1970–1971 | Pierikos | 33 | (0) |
| 1971–1973 | AO Trikala | 57 | (2) |
| 1973–1978 | AEK Athens | 69 | (0) |
| 1978–1979 | AEL | 15 | (0) |
| 1979–1981 | Atromitos | 55 | (0) |
| 1981–1983 | Diagoras | | |
| 1985–1986 | PO Elassona (player-manager) | | |
| Total | | 229 | (2) |

International career
| 1973 | Greece U21 | | |
| 1975 | Greece | 1 | (0) |
- * Club domestic league appearances and goals

Giorgos Sidiropoulos (Greek: Γιώργος Σιδηρόπουλος; 25 June 1949 – 31 December 2015) was a Greek professional footballer who played as a goalkeeper.

== Club career ==
Sidiropoulos took his first steps of his football career at the team of his hometown, PO Elassona and in 1968 he joined AO Trikala, where he became widely known competing in the first division. In 1970 he was transferred to Pierikos, but after playing there for a season, he returned to Trikala. On 12 March 1972, he became the first Greek goalkeeper to score with a penalty in the 2–1 home win against Panathinaikos, while he also scored from the spot in the following season, scoring his team's only goal in a 1–2 away defeat from Panionios. In the summer of 1973 the club of Thessaly was relegated.

On 24 July, Sidiropoulos was transferred to AEK Athens for a fee of 1.8 million drachmas, after the recommendation by their defender, Apostolos Toskas, who was also from Trikala. He established himself quickly in the squad. Sidiropoulos reached the peak of his career in 1976, when he kept a clean sheet for 700 consecutive minutes, which made him the team's record holder and 7th overall in the history of the league. In 1976 he was seriously injured, when in the derby against Olympiacos, as he clashed with Mike Galakos and ever since he lost his place as a starter. He was in the squad that reached the semi-finals of the UEFA Cup in 1977, but he didn't manage to compete in any of the matches. In the following season despite AEK winning the domestic double, he barely made any appearances and in the summer of 1978 he was released and signed for AEL.

At the team of Larissa, he played for a season, helping them to win promotion to the first division. In the summer of 1979 he signed for Atromitos where he played until 1981. Afterwards, he moved to Rhodes and joined Diagoras, where he ended his professional career in 1983. In 1985 he returned to PO Elassona as a player-manager for a year.

== International career ==
Sidiropoulos played once for Greece on 1 April 1975 in a friendly away 2–1 win against Cyprus, under the instructions of Alketas Panagoulias

== After football ==
After retiring from football, Sidiropoulos moved to Germany and became a permanent resident, working in catering businesses. He died on 31 December 2015 from cancer. His body was repatriated and buried in his native land at Elassona.

a. Does not include 2nd division stats.

== Honours ==
AEK Athens

- Alpha Ethniki: 1977–78
- Greek Cup: 1977–78

Atromitos

- Beta Ethniki: 1979–80
