= Peter Johnson (footballer, born 1954) =

English footballer (born 1954)

Personal information
- Date of birth: 18 February 1954 (age 72)
- Place of birth: Hackney, Greater London
- Position: Winger

Youth career
- ?–1971: Tottenham Hotspur

Senior career*
Years	Team	Apps	(Gls)
1971–1973	Leyton Orient	3	(0)
1973–1976	Crystal Palace	7	(0)
1976–1979	Bournemouth	107	(11)
1979–?	Weymouth	?	(?)
- * Club domestic league appearances and goals

Peter J. Johnson, (born 18 February 1954 in Hackney, Greater London) is a retired English professional footballer. He played as a winger but was also able to play in a more central role. In his career, Johnson made a total of 117 appearances in the Football League for Leyton Orient, Crystal Palace and Bournemouth between 1971 and 1979, before moving into non-league football with Weymouth.

== Playing career ==
Johnson began his football career as an amateur with Tottenham Hotspur, but he did not make a senior appearance for the club, signing instead for Leyton Orient in 1971. After only three appearances in two seasons with Leyton Orient, Johnson signed for Crystal Palace and made his debut with them on 4 January in a home 2–2 draw against Hereford United. Johnson made only three further appearances that season and three at the end of the 1975–76 season as Palace's campaign tailed off after defeat in the F.A. Cup semi-final and the club failed to gain promotion from the old Football League Third Division. In June 1976, Johnson moved on to Bournemouth where he made 107 appearances over three seasons, scoring 11 goals. In 1979, Johnson moved into non-league football with Weymouth F.C.
