= Dionysis Tsamis =

Greek footballer and manager (1951–2026)

- Tsamis with AEK Athens

Personal information
- Full name: Dionysios Tsamis
- Date of birth: 17 October 1951
- Place of birth: Agrinio, Greece
- Date of death: 1 May 2026 (aged 74)
- Place of death: Agrinio, Greece
- Height: 1.77 m (5 ft 10 in)
- Positions: Midfielder; defender; left winger

Youth career
- 1967–1968: Panetolikos

Senior career*
| Years | Team | Apps | (Gls) |
| 1968–1972 | Panetolikos | 160 | (11) |
| 1972–1980 | AEK Athens | 179 | (7) |
| 1979–1980 | → Korinthos (loan) | 20 | (0) |
| 1980–1982 | Korinthos | 38 | (0) |
| 1982–1984 | Anagennisi Arta | | |
| Total | | 415 | (18) |

International career
| 1973–1975 | Greece U21 | | |
| 1974–1976 | Greece | 2 | (0) |
| 1979 | Greece military | 2 | (0) |

Managerial career
- 1981: Korinthos
- 1985–1986: A.E. Messolonghi
- 1996: Panetolikos (interim)
- 1998: Panetolikos (interim)
- * Club domestic league appearances and goals

Dionysis Tsamis (Greek: Διονύσης Τσάμης; 17 October 1951 – 1 May 2026) was a Greek professional footballer who played as a midfielder and later a manager.

== Club career ==
Tsamis started his football career in 1967 at the youth team of Panetolikos. The manager of the men's team, Lukas Aurednik recognized his potential and expressed flattering words about him to the administration. At the start of the following season, the manager, Sotiris Karpodinis included him in the preparation of the senior team. There, he played as a substitute in a friendly match against Arta and impressed with his performance. As a result, he was established in the main squad, while soon enough he became a member of the U19 and U21 national teams. A law of the regime that allowed players to be transferred only within a prefecture or in a neighboring prefecture blocked a potential transfer of Tsamis to the clubs of Athens. Nevertheless, his common spell with the defender of AEK Athens, Apostolos Toskas in the youth departments of the national team, contributed to his desire to join the yellow-blacks. On 16 February 1972, after a friendly match between the two clubs at Agrinio, the manager of AEK Athens, Branko Stanković indicated to the club's administration for his transfer. The official of AEK, Stamatis Papastamatiou was forced to hide Tsamis at houses of his acquaintances, in order for the player not to be claimed by any other major club. However, obstacles kept coming in and delayed the issuance of a sports card to Tsamis, delaying the transfer, as well. The transfer was eventually completed on 19 October 1972 for a fee of 2.35 million drachmas.

Due to the late completion of his transfer, Tsamis was not able to compete in any domestic competition of the season. Thus, he made his debut on 8 November 1972, in the second leg of the UEFA Cup against Liverpool, which was his only official appearance in the season. Tsamis became a main player of the squad not only in their first two difficult seasons, but in the new era that began with the presidency of Loukas Barlos. The team under the manager, František Fadrhonc was distinguished both domestically and internationally, as they reached the semi-finals of the UEFA Cup in 1977. In the following seasons, they won two Championships and one Greek Cup including a double in 1978.

On 13 December 1979, Tsamis was loaned to Korinthos for a year. When his loan expired in December 1980, his move became permanent. On 4 August 1982 he moved to Anagennisi Arta, where he played until 1984.

== International career ==
Tsamis made two appearances with Greece. He was called for the first time in April 1974, but did not play in the match against Brazil at the Maracanã Stadium and his debut took place a year later, on 1 April 1975, in a 2–1 friendly away win against Cyprus, while on 10 November 1976 he made his last appearance in the home friendly match against Austria.

== Managerial career ==
In November 1981, after the manager of Korinthos, Christos Archontidis resigned, Tsamis since he had a physical education diploma, took charge of the training of the club, for a few weeks, until a replacement was found. In 1985 he was at the bench of A.E. Messolonghi for a season. Afterwards, he served as an interim manager at Panetolikos.

== Personal life ==
Alongside his football career, Tsamis studied at the Physical Education Academy and obtained his degree while playing professionally at AEK Athens. From 1982 he was appointed physical education teacher, a position he held until his retirement. He ran football academies in his hometown, Agrinio and frequently attended the events of the Veterans Association of AEK, without being an official member.

Tsamis died on 1 May 2026 at the age of 74, after long-term health issues.

== Honours ==
AEK Athens

- Alpha Ethniki: 1977–78, 1978–79
- Greek Cup: 1977–78
