= Spyros Stefanidis =

Greek footballer

Personal information
- Full name: Spyridon Stefanidis
- Date of birth: 18 December 1946 (age 79)
- Place of birth: Serres, Greece
- Position: Defender

Senior career*
Years	Team	Apps	(Gls)
1966–1973	Panserraikos		
1973–1976	AEK Athens	52	(0)
1976–1979	Atromitos		
- * Club domestic league appearances and goals

Spyros Stefanidis (Greek: Σπύρος Στεφανίδης; born 18 December 1946) is a Greek former professional footballer who played as a defender.

== Club career ==
Stefanidis started his career in 1966 at Panserraikos and played in every position in the defence, winning the second division league in his group, as well as the promotion to the first division in 1972. In the summer of 1973 AEK were making a great effort to sign Sakis Zarzopoulos from Panserraikos. The president of the yellow-blacks, Giannis Theodorakopoulos, submitted a proposal for Stefanidis as well, in order to outbid the proposal of Olympiacos.

Eventually AEK managed to sign both players, with Stefanidis proving to be a useful backup choice in the team's defensive. After his first season he began losing his position in the roster. The relocation of Lakis Nikolaou by František Fadrhonc as a center-back, the establishment of Petros Ravousis as a first choice defender, the transfer of Babis Intzoglou and the presence of Stefanos Theodoridis as well as Giorgos Skrekis in the defense, resulted in the harsh competition for a place in the lineup, which reduced his playing time.

On 3 August 1976 Stefanidis signed for Atromitos, playing in the second division. Despite their relegation in the summer of 1977, he remained at the club for two more seasons, before retiring at the age of 32.

== Honours ==
Panserraikos

- Beta Ethniki: 1971–72 (Third Group)
