= Araquem de Melo =

Brazilian footballer (1944-2001)

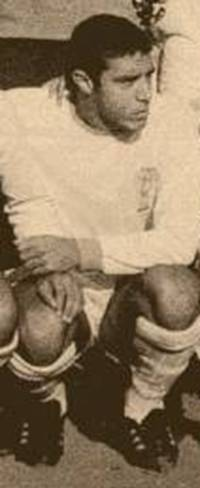
- Araquem de Melo Edemil

Personal information
- Full name: Edemil Araquem de Melo
- Date of birth: 7 July 1944
- Place of birth: Rio de Janeiro, Brazil
- Date of death: 2001
- Place of death: Venezuela
- Positions: Midfielder; forward

Youth career
- Vasco da Gama

Senior career*
| Years | Team | Apps | (Gls) |
| 1966–1967 | Danubio | 32 | (19) |
| 1968–1972 | Huracán | 59 | (19) |
| 1972–1974 | Panathinaikos | 37 | (19) |
| 1974–1975 | Atromitos | 12 | (2) |
| 1976 | Toronto Panhellenic | | |
- * Club domestic league appearances and goals

Araquem José de Melo (7 July 1944 – 17 October 2001), commonly known as Araquem de Melo, was a Brazilian footballer who played for clubs in Uruguay, Argentina and Greece.

== Career ==
Born in Rio de Janeiro, Araquem de Melo began playing football for the youth sides of local side Club de Regatas Vasco da Gama. He played for Danubio F.C. and was the Uruguayan league's top goal-scorer during the 1966 season. He played for Argentine side Club Atlético Huracán from 1968 to 1972, scoring 19 goals in 60 games and playing alongside Alfredo Obberti and Roque Avallay.

In 1972, he joined Panathinaikos as the first Brazilian footballer to play for the club. He remains the leading goalscorer among Brazilians for Panathinaikos. Araquem de Melo scored 19 goals in 37 games with Panathinaikos, along with Juan Ramón Verón and Antonis Antoniadis making a great attacking line. In 1974, he played for Atromitos. In 1976, he played in the National Soccer League with Toronto Panhellenic where he assisted in securing the NSL Championship against Toronto First Portuguese.

== Retirement ==
After he retired from playing football, Araquem de Melo founded a football school in Brazil. His brother, Arnout de Melo, assumed responsibility for the club after Araquem's death in 2001.

In 2001, he committed suicide, due to debt problems.
