= Charis Grammos =

Greek footballer

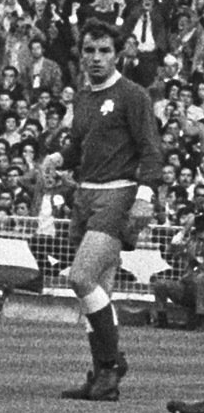
- Panathinaikos footballer Aristidis Kamaras in the Wembley final, 1971

Personal information
- Full name: Charilaos Grammos
- Date of birth: 11 December 1948 (age 77)
- Place of birth: Kingdom of Greece
- Position: Forward

Senior career*
Years	Team	Apps	(Gls)
–1966	Achilleas Mitilinis		
1966–1976	Panathinaikos	215	(56)
1976–1977	Olympiacos	4	(0)
1977–1978	Kallithea		
- * Club domestic league appearances and goals

Charis Grammos (Greek: Χάρης Γραμμός; born 11 December 1948) is a former Greek football player of the 1960s–1970s era.

== Career ==
Born in Mytilene, Lesbos, Grammos began playing football as a winger for Achilleas Mytilene until he was acquired in 1966 by Panathinaikos for 600,000 drachmas, at a time when the "greens" were looking for young players to replace six of the older stars that had rebelled against coach Stjepan Bobek.

Grammos played as right forward or right midfielder. He was a mainstay for Panathinaikos for the next 10 years and was a member of the team that played at 1971 European Cup Final in Wembley Stadium. Later in his career, he played for Olympiacos, becoming one of the few players that made the cross-over between the two "eternal enemies". Grammos made a total of 215 appearances in the Alpha Ethniki.

== Honours ==
Panathinaikos

- Alpha Ethniki: 1969, 1970, 1972
- Greek Cup: 1967, 1969
