= Lazaros Papadopoulos (footballer) =

Greek footballer (born 1950)

Personal information
- Full name: Lazaros Papadopoulos
- Date of birth: 16 August 1950 (age 76)
- Place of birth: Veria, Greece
- Height: 1.75 m (5 ft 9 in)
- Positions: Midfielder; winger; full-back

Senior career*
Years	Team	Apps	(Gls)
–1973	Veria		
1973–1979	AEK Athens	74	(7)
1979–1980	Rodos		

Managerial career
- 2008: Veria (caretaker)
- 2012–: Agrotikos Asteras Agia Varvara
- * Club domestic league appearances and goals

Lazaros Papadopoulos (Greek: Λάζαρος Παπαδόπουλος; born 16 August 1950) is a Greek former professional footballer who played as right midfielder and a manager.

== Club career ==
Papadopoulos started his career at the club of his hometown, Veria.

Οn 31 August 1973 he was transferred to AEK Athens for a fee of 1.3 million drachmas. At the time, the presence of many prominent footballers in the team's roster did not leave much room for his establishment in the main squad. However, Papadopoulos manage to help the club in contributing to the club to their glorious days both domestically and internationally. On 1 October 1975 he scored his first goal in the UEFA competitions in the 3–1 home win against Vojvodina for the UEFA Cup. He was a part of the squad that reached to the semi-finals of the UEFA Cup in 1977. In fact he scored the only goal of his team in the first leg of the semi-finals against Juventus in the 4–1 defeat at Stadio Comunale on 6 April 1977. His last goal for AEK was on 21 February 1979, in the 4–0 victory over Acharnaikos for the round of 16 of the cup. With the yellow-black jersey, he won 2 consecutive championships, a Greek Cup including a domestic double in 1978.

Papadopoulos left AEK and on 15 August 1979 he signed at Rodos, where he played for a season. Afterwards, he competed in clubs of smaller categories, before he retired as a footballer.

== Managerial career ==
Papadopoulos after the end of his career as a football player, he followed a career as a coach, but without special distinctions. In 2008 he worked at the bench of Veria as a caretaker manager after the resignation of Vasilios Papachristou. In 2012, he had been the coach of the women's football second division side, Agrotikos Asteras Agia Varvara.

== Honours ==
AEK Athens

- Alpha Ethniki: 1977–78, 1978–79
- Greek Cup: 1977–78
