= Sakis Zarzopoulos =

Greek footballer

Personal information
- Full name: Αthanasios Zarzopoulos
- Date of birth: 15 December 1949 (age 76)
- Place of birth: Serres, Greece
- Height: 1.78 m (5 ft 10 in)
- Positions: Defender; defensive midfielder

Senior career*
Years	Team	Apps	(Gls)
1969–1973	Panserraikos	81	(11)
1973–1977	AEK Athens	69	(11)
1977–1978	OFI	32	(2)
1978–1979	Panserraikos	11	(0)
Total		193	(24)

International career
1973	Greece U21		
- * Club domestic league appearances and goals

Sakis Zarzopoulos (Greek: Σάκης Ζαρζόπουλος; born 15 December 1949) is a Greek former professional footballer who played as a defender.

== Club career ==
Zarzopoulos began football at a professional level in 1969 at his hometown club, Panserraikos, where he was quickly established as a key player in their defense. He competed in all positions of defense, as he possessed both the strength and agility required for a centre-back, as well as the technical ability and speed required for the positions of side backs, while his physical and technical skills gave him the opportunity to score several times. In the summer of 1973, he attracted the interest of both Olympiacos and AEK Athens. In the end, AEK managed to sign him, including in their offer the acquisition of his teammate, Spyros Stefanidis, as well.

In the yellow-blacks he was used as the solution to cover any defensive gap that appeared in the squad. On 29 October 1973, he scored a brace that helped AEK get the victory by 1–2 over Ethnikos Piraeus at Karaiskakis Stadium. He was a part of the squad that reached to the semi-finals of the UEFA Cup in 1977.

On 3 August 1977 Zarzopoulos moved to OFI, where he played for a season, before returning to Panserraikos. In the summer of 1979, after the relegation of the club to the second division, he ended his career.

== Managerial career ==
After the end of his career as a footballer, he became involved in coaching, usually working in teams in the local division of Serres, with the last club of his career being Visaltikos Nigritas.

== Honours ==
Panserraikos

- Beta Ethniki: 1971–72
