= Nikos Karoulias =

Greek footballer and manager (born 1954)

Personal information
- Full name: Nikolaos Karoulias
- Date of birth: 7 February 1954 (age 72)
- Place of birth: Samos, Greece
- Positions: Left back; left midfielder; attacking midfielder

Youth career
- 1971–1973: AEK Athens

Senior career*
Years	Team	Apps	(Gls)
1973–1976	AEK Athens	3	(1)
1976–1980	Apollon Athens	45	(3)
1980–1988	Panathinaikos	152	(0)
Total		200	(4)

International career
1974	Greece U19		
1974–1975	Greece U21		
1981–1985	Greece	31	(1)

Managerial career
- 1996: Proodeftiki
- 1997: Panathinaikos (interim)
- 1997–1998: Proodeftiki
- 1998–1999: Athinaikos
- 1999–2000: Proodeftiki
- 2001: Kallithea
- 2010–2011: Apollon Smyrnis
- * Club domestic league appearances and goals

Nikos Karoulias (Greek: Νίκος Καρούλιας; born 7 February 1954) is a Greek former professional footballer who played as a left back and a former manager.

== Club career ==
Karoulias started his football career at the academies of AEK Athens. Ιn 1973 he was promoted to the men's team under Stan Anderson. Despite making some appearances in his first season at the club, he spent the two following seasons without making a single appearance. On 24 July 1976 he was released from AEK and signed for Apollon Athens, where he remained for four seasons.

In the summer of 1980, he made the big leap of his career when he was transferred to Panathinaikos. He was distinguished for his spirited game, while the highlight of his career was his participation as a starter in the team that reached the semi-finals of the European Cup in 1985. At Panathinaikos he won 2 Championships and 4 Greek Cups and a Greek Super Cup including 2 domestic doubles in 1984 and 1986. He played in the "greens" until the 1988, when he retired at the age of 34.

== International career ==
Karoulias played for the first time with Greece on 14 October 1981, in the home match against Denmark (2-3), for the qualifiers of the 1982 FIFA World Cup. He participated in a total of 31 matches, scoring 1 goal.

== Managerial career ==
After he retired as a footballer, Karoulias followed a career as a coach, with his most important moment being his brief presence at the bench of Panathinaikos in 1997, while he has also worked in other clubs, including Athinaikos, Panargiakos, Olympiakos Nicosia, Anorthosis Famagusta, Proodeftiki, Kallithea and Apollon Smyrnis from 1996 until 2011.

== Honours ==
Panathinaikos

- Alpha Ethniki: 1983–84, 1985–86
- Greek Cup: 1981–82, 1983–84, 1985–86, 1987–88
- Greek Super Cup: 1988
