= Nikos Stathopoulos =

Greek footballer and manager (born 1943)

Personal information
- Full name: Nikolaos Stathopoulos
- Date of birth: 8 November 1943 (age 82)
- Place of birth: Lamia, German-occupied Greece
- Height: 1.73 m (5 ft 8 in)
- Positions: Left midfielder; left back

Youth career
- 1956–1966: AEK Athens

Senior career*
Years	Team	Apps	(Gls)
1966–1974	AEK Athens	163	(6)
1974–1975	Apollon Athens	36	(1)
1975–1977	Proodeftiki		
1977–1978	Korinthos		
1978–1979	Panegialios		
1980–1984	Ilioupoli (Player-manager)		
Total		199	(7)

International career
1969–1971	Greece	12	(0)

Managerial career
- 1985–1986: Diagoras Aigaleo
- 1986: Marko
- * Club domestic league appearances and goals

Nikos Stathopoulos (Greek: Νίκος Σταθόπουλος; born 8 November 1943) is a Greek former professional footballer who played as a left midfielder and a later manager. He was one of the few modern left-backs in Greece in the 1960s. Creative but also inhibiting, dynamic and with technical quality, Stathopoulos spent most of his playing career at AEK Athens and their academies, where he played almost twenty years. He also played one season at Apollon Athens, two at Proodeftiki, one at Korinthos and one at Panegialios and afterwards went to Ilioupoli, where he finished his career competing as a player-manager. He also had 2 managerial stints at Diagoras Aigaleo and Marko.

== Club career ==
Stathopoulos started football in 1956 when he joined the academies of AEK Athens. In 1963, he was promoted to the youth team, and three years later, he joined the senior team. On 1 May 1966, he made his debut in a home match against Panionios, where it took him just 11 minutes to score his first goal and open the score for his team in an imposing 5–1 win for AEK. He established himself quickly in the squad, playing by convention as a left-back, becoming the first modern full-back in Greece in the 60s. He was a left midfielder with high technical skill, speed and crosses, often used on the left side of the defense due to the offensive game of AEK. He was a pioneer for the position and far ahead of his time, since he was one of the few side-backs with assists and goals in their repertoire, while he also was one of the first players who did the overlap when that was an unknown concept for Greek football. A key member of the team that won second place in the Balkans Cup in 1967, losing in the final to Fenerbahçe. He was also one of the main players in the squad that reached the quarter-finals of the European Cup in 1969. On 23 December 1973, he scored a brace in a home match against Apollon Athens, shaping the final 4–1. He spent most of his career at AEK, winning 2 Championships and 1 Cup. In the summer of 1974, he left the club somewhat inelegantly, as a part of the renewal of the roster, decided by both the new president of the club, Loukas Barlos and the manager, František Fadrhonc

On 19 August 1974, Stathopoulos signed for Apollon Athens. They competed in the second division and he helped them win the championship of the 2nd group and the promotion to the first division. On 20 August 1975, he moved to Proodeftiki, playing for another two seasons in the second division. On 25 August 1977, he signed for Korinthos. He played in the club for one season before moving to Panegialios, where he won the south group of the second division in 1979. On 7 July 1980, he took over as a player-manager at Ilioupoli, where he retired as footballer in 1984.

== International career ==
Stathopoulos played 12 times with Greece from 1969 to 1971. He made his debut on 4 May 1969 in a 2–2 draw away from home against Portugal for the 1970 FIFA World Cup qualifiers, where he replaced Babis Intzoglou under the instructions of Dan Georgiadis.

== Managerial career ==
Stathopoulos worked as a manager in low tears clubs, such as Diagoras Aigaleo and Marko.

== Honours ==
AEK Athens

- Alpha Ethniki: 1967–68, 1970–71
- Greek Cup: 1965–66

Apollon Athens

- Beta Ethniki: 1974–75 (2nd Group)

Korinthos

- Beta Ethniki: 1978–79 (South Group)
