= Stefanos Theodoridis =

Greek footballer

Personal information
- Full name: Stefanos Theodoridis
- Date of birth: 19 June 1950 (age 76)
- Place of birth: Istanbul, Tyrkey
- Height: 1.80 m (5 ft 11 in)
- Position: Defender

Youth career
- 1965–1969: AEK Athens

Senior career*
Years	Team	Apps	(Gls)
1969–1978	AEK Athens	195	(0)
1978–1979	Olympiacos		
1979–1980	OFI		

International career
- Greece U19
- Greece U21
1971	Greece	1	(0)
- * Club domestic league appearances and goals

Stefanos Theodoridis (Greek: Στέφανος Θεοδωρίδης; born 1950) is a Greek former professional footballer who played as a defender in the 1970s.

== Club career ==
Theodoridis started his career at the academies of AEK Athens playing as a forward and was promoted to the senior team in 1969 with the renewal of roster attempted by the manager, Branko Stanković. The Yogoslav relocated the young footballer as a full-back, while he could also compete as a centre-back. He was a key player in the course of AEK to the semi-finals of the UEFA Cup in 1977. With AEK Theodoridis won two Greek Championships and one Greek Cup, including a domestic double in 1978.

In the summer of 1978 he moved to Olympiacos, where he played for one season. Afterwards, Theodoridis signed for OFI, where he retired in 1980.

== International career ==
Theodoridis was capped once by the Greece national football team in 1971.

== After football ==
Theodoridis became a Physical Education teacher and was involved with local government, having served for seven years as deputy mayor of cleanliness and water supply, for twelve years as president of the Sports Organization, and for two years as president of the Municipal Council of Nea Makri., while remaining in contact with the veterans association of AEK Athens.

== Honours ==
AEK Athens

- Alpha Ethniki: 1970–71, 1977–78
- Greek Cup: 1977–78
