= Apostolos Toskas =

Greek footballer and manager (born 1947)

Personal information
- Full name: Apostolos Toskas
- Date of birth: 28 December 1947 (age 78)
- Place of birth: Trikala, Greece
- Height: 1.76 m (5 ft 9 in)
- Position: Defender

Senior career*
Years	Team	Apps	(Gls)
1965–1969	Trikala	83	(1)
1969–1979	AEK Athens	186	(1)
1979–1981	Atromitos	26	(0)
1981–1986	Triglia Rafinas		
Total		295	(2)

International career
1969	Greece U21		
1969–1973	Greece	20	(0)

Managerial career
- 1993–1995: Aris Petroupolis
- 1995–1996: AEK Athens Academy
- 1996–1997: AEK Athens (assistant)
- * Club domestic league appearances and goals

Apostolos Toskas (Greek: Απόστολος Τόσκας; born 28 December 1947) is a Greek former professional footballer who played as defender and a former manager.

== Club career ==
Toskas began his football career at the age of 18 at Trikala, where he attracted the insterest of the big clubs of the country. On 12 July 1969 he moved to Athens and was transferred to AEK Athens for a fee of 1,500,000 drachmas. The manager Branko Stanković had a lot of faith in him and immediately established him in the starting eleven. Very quickly he became an international and one of the club's key players in the defense. The most important moment of his career was his participation to the semi-finals of the UEFA Cup in 1977. In the decade he played for AEK, he won 3 Championships and a Greek Cup, including a domestic double in 1978.

On 2 August 1979 Toskas moved to Atromitos, where he spent 2 seasons, ending his professional career. He continued at an amateur level, playing for Triglia Rafinas as a player-manager, until the summer of 1986.

== International career ==
Toskas was a member of Greece U21, which in 1969 won the 2nd Balkan Youth Championship.

Toskas made his debut for Greece on 19 July 1969 in an away friendly 1–0 defeat against Australia, under the guidance of Dan Georgiadis. In total he competed in 20 matches between 1969 and 1973.

== Managerial career ==
Since his retirement, Toskas was involved in coaching, working with many amateur clubs in Athens, such as Aris Petroupolis. In 1995 he worked at AEK as the manager of their reserve team, alongside Andreas Stamatiadis. In the following season he became the assistant manager of Petros Ravousis in the men's team.

== Personal life ==
Toskas is an integral member of the Veterans Association of AEK Athens.

His son, Grigoris was also a footballer who played at AEK Athens from 2000 to 2005.

== Honours ==
Trikala

- Beta Ethniki: 1967–68 (North Group)

AEK Athens

- Alpha Ethniki: 1970–71, 1977–78, 1978–79
- Greek Cup: 1977–78

Atromitos

- Beta Ethniki: 1979–80 (South Group)

Greece U21

- Balkan Youth Championship: 1969
