= 1974–75 AEK Athens F.C. season =

AEK Athens
1974–75 season
- Chairman: Loukas Barlos
- Manager: František Fadrhonc
- Stadium: AEK Stadium
- Alpha Ethniki: 2nd
- Greek Cup: Quarter-finals
- Top goalscorer: League: Walter Wagner (17); All: Walter Wagner (20)
- Highest home attendance: 28,866 vs Panathinaikos (20 April 1975)
- Lowest home attendance: 7,417 vs Panserraikos (8 June 1975)
- Average home league attendance: 18,798
- Biggest win: AEK Athens 5–0 Panserraikos
- Biggest defeat: Olympiacos 3–0 AEK Athens
Home colours

The 1974–75 season was the 51st season in the existence of AEK Athens F.C. and the 16th consecutive season in the top flight of Greek football. They competed in the Alpha Ethniki and the Greek Cup. The season began on 29 September 1974 and finished on 8 June 1975.

== Overview ==
The summer of 1974 marked the beginning of a new era in the history of the club. The political situation in Greece was normalizing and the "government commissioners" were detaching from the sports clubs. From the previous season Loukas Barlos, a prominent industrialist with the main occupation of the bauxite trade from the region of Boeotia, took charge of AEK. He had a vision to make AEK a team that would surpass the Greek standards.

Barlos started to build the team that he envisioned and without sparing any money he hired František Fadrhonc as the new manager. The Czechoslovak manager was a specialist in both training and coaching, while he was also co-creator of the "flying" Dutchmen of the early 70's, alongside Rinus Michels. Fadrhonc who was a huge name for the Greek standards of the time brought to AEK a series of innovations both in the style of training and coaching, as well as in their organizational structure. The "grandfather", as he was nicknamed, due to his age, set new standards even to the sports equipment and the team's clothing. AEK became the first Greek club to be dressed by a large sportswear brand. The two legally allowed positions of foreign players were filled by two Germans, the forward, Walter Wagner from Austria Wien and Timo Zahnleiter from 1860 München, who was one of the first modern defensive midfielders to play in Greece. From the domestic football market Barlos signed notable players, such as the fast winger, Christos Ardizoglou from Apollon Athens and the diligent scorer, Georgios Dedes, alongside the defender, Giorgos Skrekis from Panionios.

The results were impressive and the renewed AEK, presented the best attack and the best defense of the league, having only two defeats. The second one which was a 3–0 defeat against Olympiacos was the one that cost them the title, since they finished second with 2 points behind the red and whites.

In the Cup, AEK entered at the round of 32, where they eliminated Ethnikos Piraeus, winning them by 2–0 away from home. Afterwards, they passed through Kavala with a 3–0 win at home and reached the quarter-finals. There, they were eliminated by Iraklis with a 1–0 defeat at Kaftanzoglio Stadium.

Top scorer of the club in the league was Walter Wagner with 17 goals. The new administration and the performance of the team, showed that the club had the potential to claim titles and distinctions in the years to come.

== Management team ==
Position	Staff
Manager	(Czechoslovakia) František Fadrhonc
Assistant manager	(Greece) Efthymis Kazakis
Goalkeeping coach	(Greece) Stelios Serafidis
Academy manager	(Greece) Kostas Chatzimichail

== Players ==
=== Squad information ===
NOTE: The players are the ones that have been announced by the AEK Athens' press release. No edits should be made unless a player arrival or exit is announced. Updated 8 June 1975, 23:59 UTC+3.

Player	Nat.	Position(s)	Date of birth (Age)	Signed	Previous club	Transfer fee	Contract until
Goalkeepers
Néstor Errea	(Argentina)	GK	27 April 1939 (aged 36)	1972	(Argentina) Banfield	Free	1975
Giorgos Sidiropoulos	(Greece)	GK	25 June 1949 (aged 26)	1973	(Greece) Trikala	₯1,800,000	1981
Lakis Stergioudas	(Greece)	GK	11 December 1952 (aged 22)	1972	(Greece) Niki Polygyros	₯36,000	1981
Giorgos Daditsos	(Greece)	GK	9 March 1953 (aged 22)	1974	(Greece) AEK Athens U20	—	1982
Defenders
Giorgos Skrekis	(Greece)	RB / CB	2 February 1945 (aged 30)	1974	(Greece) Panionios	₯500,000	1982
Spyros Stefanidis	(Greece)	CB / RB	18 December 1946 (aged 28)	1973	(Greece) Panserraikos	₯500,000	1981
Apostolos Toskas	(Greece)	CB	28 December 1947 (aged 27)	1969	(Greece) Trikala	₯1,500,000	1977
Lakis Nikolaou	(Greece)	CB / RB / ST / RW	17 July 1949 (aged 25)	1971	(Greece) Atromitos	₯600,000	1979
Sakis Zarzopoulos	(Greece)	CB / DM / RB / LB	15 December 1949 (aged 25)	1973	(Greece) Panserraikos	₯2,500,000	1981
Stefanos Theodoridis	(Greece)	RB / LB / CB / RM / LM	19 June 1950 (aged 25)	1969	(Greece) AEK Athens U20	—	1977
Victoras Theofilopoulos	(Greece)	LB	1951 (aged 23–24)	1974	(Greece) Panionios	₯500,000	1982
Nikos Karoulias	(Greece)	LB / LM / AM	25 May 1953 (aged 22)	1973	(Greece) AEK Athens U20	—	1981
Giorgos Kontopoulos	(Greece)	LB / CB	1954 (aged 20–21)	1973	(Greece) AEK Athens U20	—	1981
Petros Ravousis	(Greece)	CB / RB	1 October 1954 (aged 20)	1972	(Greece) Aetos Skydra	Free	1981
Midfielders
Giorgos Lavaridis	(Greece)	CM / DM / CB	15 October 1947 (aged 27)	1968	(Greece) AEK Athens U20	—	1976
Timo Zahnleiter	(West Germany)	CM / DM	16 December 1948 (aged 26)	1974	(West Germany) 1860 München	₯1,200,000	1976
Takis Timotheou	(Cyprus)	AM / CB	1949 (aged 25–26)	1974	(Cyprus) APOEL	Free	1982
Lazaros Papadopoulos	(Greece)	RM / RB / LM / LB / RW / LW	3 January 1950 (aged 25)	1973	(Greece) Veria	₯1,300,000	1981
Dionysis Tsamis	(Greece)	CM / DM / AM	17 October 1951 (aged 23)	1972	(Greece) Panetolikos	₯2,350,000	1981
Vangelis Makos	(Greece)	LM / LW	18 January 1952 (aged 23)	1972	(Greece) Thriamvos Athens	Free	1980
Christos Ardizoglou	(Greece) (Israel)	RM / LM / RW / LW / AM / RB / LB	25 March 1953 (aged 22)	1974	(Greece) Apollon Athens	₯12,000,000	1982
Forwards
Mimis Papaioannou (Captain)	(Greece)	SS / ST / AM / RW	17 November 1942 (aged 32)	1962	(Greece) Veria	₯175,000	1976
Georgios Dedes	(Greece)	ST / SS / RW / LW / RM / LM	25 February 1943 (aged 32)	1974	(Greece) Panionios	₯1,000,000	1982
Walter Wagner	(West Germany)	ST / SS / RW / LW / RM	26 July 1949 (aged 25)	1974	Austria Wien	Free	1976
Tasos Konstantinou	(Cyprus)	RW / SS / ST / RM / AM	11 March 1951 (aged 24)	1972	(Cyprus) EPA Larnaca	₯600,000	1980
Jorge Falero Fanìs	(Uruguay) (Greece)	ST	4 July 1952 (aged 22)	1973	(Uruguay) Danubio	₯750,000	1975

== Transfers ==
=== In ===
Pos.	Player	From	Fee	Date	Contract Until	Source
GK	(Greece) Giorgos Daditsos	(Greece) AEK Athens U20	Promotion	9 August 1974	30 June 1982	
DF	(Greece) Giorgos Skrekis	(Greece) Panionios	₯500,000^{[a]}	8 August 1974	30 June 1982	
DF	(Greece) Victoras Theofilopoulos	(Greece) Panionios	₯500,000^{[a]}	8 August 1974	30 June 1982	
MF	(West Germany) Timo Zahnleiter	(West Germany) 1860 München	₯1,200,000	4 September 1974	30 June 1976	
MF	(Greece) Christos Ardizoglou	(Greece) Apollon Athens	₯12,000,000^{[b]}	7 August 1974	30 June 1982	
MF	(Cyprus) Takis Timotheou	(Cyprus) APOEL	Free transfer	20 June 1974	30 June 1982	
FW	(Greece) Giorgos Kachris	(Greece) Kalamata	Loan return	1 July 1974	30 June 1977	
FW	(Greece) Georgios Dedes	(Greece) Panionios	₯1,000,000^{[a]}	8 August 1974	30 June 1982	
FW	(West Germany) Walter Wagner	Austria Wien	Free transfer	1 July 1974	30 June 1976	

a. Plus Kostas Panagiotopoulos, Babis Psimogiannos and Ivan Kypritidis as exchange. AEK also paid a total fee of ₯2,000,000 to Panionios. The fee was apportioned to each player for accounting purposes.
b. Plus Stefanos Karypidis and Theodoros Kolovos and Thanasis Polychronopoulos (from the reserve team) as exchange. He was initially acquired with a one-year loan with a fee of ₯3,850,000 and mandatory buy-out option of another ₯8,150,000, but in the following season it counted as transfer.

=== Out ===
Pos.	Player	To	Fee	Date	Source
DF	(Greece) Giorgos Tanidis	(Greece) Panachaiki	Contract termination	16 August 1974	
MF	(Greece) Giorgos Karafeskos	(Greece) Kastoria	Free transfer	12 August 1974	
MF	(Greece) Nikos Stathopoulos	(Greece) Apollon Athens	Free transfer	19 August 1974	
FW	(Greece) Giorgos Kachris	(Greece) Panachaiki	Contract termination	20 August 1974	
FW	(Greece) Kostas Panagiotopoulos	(Greece) Panionios	Free transfer	8 August 1974	
FW	(Greece) Ivan Kypritidis	(Greece) Panionios	Free transfer	8 August 1974	
FW	(Greece) Stefanos Karypidis	(Greece) Apollon Athens	Contract termination	9 August 1974	
FW	(Greece) Babis Psimogiannos	(Greece) Panionios	Free transfer	8 August 1974	
FW	(Greece) Takis Karachisaridis	(Greece) Kastoria	Free transfer	1 July 1974	

=== Overall transfer activity ===
Expenditure: ▼ ₯15,200,000

Income: ▲ ₯0

Net Total: ▼ ₯15,200,000

== Pre-season and friendlies ==
20 August 1974 Friendly	AEK Athens	4–0	AEK Athens Veterans	Nea Filadelfeia
21:00 EET (UTC+2)	Papaioannou 44'; Fanìs 63'; Papadopoulos 73'; Ardizoglou 88'	Report		Stadium: AEK Stadium; Attendance: 14,534; Referee: Mandalis
Note: The team of the veterans was consisted of Serafidis, Kefalidis, Sofianidis, Balopoulos, Vasiliou, Skevofilakas, Petridis, Stamatiadis, Nestoridis, Kanakis, Pomonis, Kreouzas, Kalyvopoulos, Ventouris, Skafidas, Simigdalas, Poulis, Lianos, Nikolaidis, Papageorgiou and Tsachouridis.

23 August 1974 Friendly	AEK Athens	8–0	Koukouvaounes	Nea Filadelfeia
21:00 EET (UTC+2)	Dedes 4', 20', 62'; Papadopoulos 11' (pen.); Wagner 24', 47'; Zahnleiter 31'; Ardizoglou 54' (pen.)	Report		Stadium: AEK Stadium; Attendance: 4,371; Referee: Barounis

26 August 1974 Friendly	AEK Athens	3–2	Egaleo	Nea Filadelfeia
21:00 EET (UTC+2)	Wagner 46'; Fanìs 52'; Papaioannou 88'	Report	Chrysostomou (yellow card) 28'; Lalousis 43'; Chastalis 75'	Stadium: AEK Stadium; Attendance: 17,585; Referee: Nikos Makris (Athens)

28 August 1974 Friendly	AEK Athens	1–0	PAS Giannina	Nea Filadelfeia
21:00 EET (UTC+2)	Ardizoglou 21'	Report		Stadium: AEK Stadium; Attendance: 15,869; Referee: Kattis

2 September 1974 Friendly	AEK Athens	3–0	Kalamata	Nea Filadelfeia
21:00 EET (UTC+2)	Dedes 33'; Wagner 53'; Papaioannou 60'	Report		Stadium: AEK Stadium; Attendance: 12,896; Referee: Alexopoulos (Athens)

5 September 1974 Friendly	Koropi	2–1	AEK Athens	Koropi
16:30 EET (UTC+2)	Angelis 65'; Sarris 83'	Report	Makos 52'	Stadium: Antonis Priftis Stadium; Referee: Makis Germanakos (Athens)

6 September 1974 Friendly	AEK Athens	0–1	Olympiacos	Nea Filadelfeia
21:00 EET (UTC+2)	Ardizoglou (yellow card) 64'	Report	Davourlis 40'; Galakos (yellow card) 77'; Viera (yellow card) 84'	Stadium: AEK Stadium; Attendance: 29,330; Referee: Giorgos Petropoulos (Athens)

8 September 1974 Friendly	AEK Athens	2–1	Apollon Athens	Nea Filadelfeia
21:00 EET (UTC+2)	Wagner 24'; Zahnleiter 33'	Report	Kyrmizas 53'	Stadium: AEK Stadium; Attendance: 5,000; Referee: Moschatos

11 September 1974 Friendly	PAOK	0–1	AEK Athens	Thessaloniki
20:00 EET (UTC+2)		Report	Papaioannou 32'	Stadium: Toumba Stadium; Attendance: 15,296; Referee: Giorgos Parasidis (Thessaloniki)

14 September 1974 Friendly	AEK Athens	5–2	Lens	Nea Filadelfeia
20:30 EET (UTC+2)	Konstantinou 30'; Ardizoglou 36'; Dedes 54', 75'; Wagner 70'	Report	Argyroudis (yellow card) 40', (goal) 89' (pen.); Lemerre 58'	Stadium: AEK Stadium; Attendance: 16,402; Referee: Nikos Fakis (Athens)

22 September 1974 Friendly	AEK Athens	0–1	Olympiacos	Nea Filadelfeia
20:30 EET (UTC+2)	Papadopoulos (penalty missed) 77'	Report	Vasilopoulos 85'	Stadium: AEK Stadium; Attendance: 17,132; Referee: Christos Michas (Athens)

13 October 1974 Friendly	AEK Athens	4–2	AEK Athens U20	Nea Filadelfeia
15:30 EET (UTC+2)	Zahnleiter 14'; Ardizoglou 16'; Dedes 44'; Konstantinou 49'	Report	Fanìs 4' (pen.); Michalas 50'	Stadium: AEK Stadium; Referee: Efthymis Kazakis
Note: 60-minute match. The U20 team was reinforced with Stergioudas, Errea, Kontopoulos, Theofilopoulos, Lavaridis, Makos, Fanìs and Timotheou.

30 October 1974 Friendly	AEK Athens	5–1	PAO Thriamvos Athens	Nea Filadelfeia
15:00 EET (UTC+2)	Fanìs 21', 32', 33'; Zarzopoulos 53'; Konstantinou 78'	Report	Tountas 39' (pen.)	Stadium: AEK Stadium; Referee: Louizos

7 November 1974 Friendly	Ikaros Athens	0–8	AEK Athens	Nea Ionia
14:30 EET (UTC+2)		Report	Wagner 8', 12', 78'; Dedes 18', 22', 39'; Ardizoglou 48', 75'	Stadium: Municipal Stadium of Nea Ionia; Referee: Nikos Makris (Athens)

13 November 1974 Friendly	Panathinaikos	2–0	AEK Athens	Ampelokipoi
15:15 EET (UTC+2)	Fuchs 79'; Seitaridis 84'	Report		Stadium: Leoforos Alexandras Stadium; Attendance: 6,121; Referee: Nikos Makris (Athens)

9 December 1974 Friendly	AEK Athens	3–0	Apollon Athens	Nea Filadelfeia
15:00 EET (UTC+2)	Konstantinou 5'; Dedes 22'; Wagner 70'	Report	Yfantis (penalty missed) 35'	Stadium: AEK Stadium; Referee: Paleologos

8 January 1975 Friendly	AEK Athens	3–0	Lille	Nea Filadelfeia
15:00 EET (UTC+2)	Wagner 7'; Ardizoglou 40'; Konstantinou 90'	Report		Stadium: AEK Stadium; Attendance: 4,731; Referee: Kastanos (Athens)

28 January 1975 Friendly	AEK Athens	1–1	Greece U21	Nea Filadelfeia
15:00 EET (UTC+2)	Konstantinou 72'	Report	Pontikis 73'	Stadium: AEK Stadium; Referee: Giorgos Petropoulos (Athens)
Note: Petros Ravousis, Nikos Karoulias, Dionysis Tsamis and Christos Ardizoglou competed with Greece U21 against their team.

30 January 1975 Friendly	Kallithea	3–3	AEK Athens	Kallithea
15:00 EET (UTC+2)	Persidis 47'; Drivas 52', 60'	Report	Ardizoglou 29'; Zahnleiter 31'; Fanìs 71'	Stadium: Grigoris Lamprakis Stadium; Referee: Loizos (Athens)

26 February 1975 Friendly	Apollon Athens	2–3	AEK Athens	Nea Filadelfeia
15:30 EET (UTC+2)	Triantafyllidis 21', 53'	Report	Konstantinou 32' (pen.); Papaioannou 48', 60'	Stadium: AEK Stadium; Referee: Mandalis

8 April 1975 Friendly	AEK Athens	12–1	Petralona	Nea Filadelfeia
16:30 EEST (UTC+3)	Konstantinou 6' (pen.), 26', 36', 38', 62', 73', 88'; Papadopoulos 14', 24', 82'; Toskas 28'; Fanìs 65'	Report	Arapis 34'	Stadium: AEK Stadium; Referee: Tsopouroglou

15 May 1975 Friendly	Olympiakos Neon Liosion	2–3	AEK Athens	Ano Liosia
17:00 EEST (UTC+3)	Archodoulis 10', 25'	Report	Stefanidis 30' (pen.); Timotheou 44'; Fanìs 82'	Stadium: Ano Liosia Municipal Stadium; Attendance: 5,000; Referee: Stelios Serafidis

22 May 1975 Friendly	AEK Athens	2–0	PAO Rouf	Nea Filadelfeia
17:30 EEST (UTC+3)	Konstantinou 10'; Theodoropoulos 40'	Report		Stadium: AEK Stadium; Referee: Tsirikolias

29 May 1975 Friendly	AEK Athens	3–3	Korinthos	Nea Filadelfeia
16:00 EEST (UTC+3)	Konstantinou 50'; Fanìs 52'; Theodoropoulos 84'	Report	Taktikos 29', 86'; Antoniou 39'	Stadium: AEK Stadium; Referee: Athanasiou

5 June 1975 Friendly	AEK Athens	12–1	Ilisiakos	Nea Filadelfeia
18:00 EEST (UTC+3)	Wagner 8', 30', 44'; Ardizoglou 17', 37' (pen.), 82'; Papadopoulos 40'; T. Konstantinou 46', 55', 59', 61', 69'	Report	Avlonitis 35'	Stadium: AEK Stadium; Attendance: 2,000; Referee: Angelou

10 June 1975 Friendly	AEK Athens	5–3	Kickers Offenbach	Nea Filadelfeia
21:30 EEST (UTC+3)	Konstantinou 24', 68'; Dedes 36'; Nikolaou 70'; Toskas 72'	Report	Janzon 15'; Schwemmle 78'; Kostedde 81'	Stadium: AEK Stadium; Attendance: 5,000; Referee: Ι. Marinos (Athens)

== Competitions ==
=== Overall record ===
Competition	First match	Last match	Starting round	Final position	Record							
Competition	First match	Last match	Starting round	Final position	Pld	W	D	L	GF	GA	GD	Win %
Alpha Ethniki	29 September 1974	8 June 1975	Matchday 1	2nd	34	23	9	2	73	20	+53	67.65
Greek Cup	5 February 1975	30 April 1975	Round of 32	Quarter-finals	3	2	0	1	5	1	+4	66.67
Total					37	25	9	3	78	21	+57	67.57

Last updated: 8 June 1975
Source: Competitions

=== Alpha Ethniki ===
==== League table ====
Pos	Team	Pld	W	D	L	GF	GA	GD	Pts	Qualification or relegation
1	Olympiacos (C)	34	24	9	1	65	21	+44	57	Qualification for European Cup first round
2	AEK Athens	34	23	9	2	73	20	+53	55	Qualification for UEFA Cup first round
3	PAOK	34	19	8	7	73	28	+45	46	Qualification for UEFA Cup first round
4	Ethnikos Piraeus	34	17	11	6	48	28	+20	45	
5	Panathinaikos	34	14	12	8	62	41	+21	40	Qualification for Cup Winners' Cup first round (Note: Since Olympiacos, winners of 1974–75 Greek Football Cup, was qualified for the 1975–76 European Cup, losing cup finalists Panathinaikos earned a spot in the first round of the 1975–76 European Cup Winners' Cup.)

Source: RSSSF
Rules for classification: 1st points; 2nd decision match; 3rd head-to-head goal difference.
(C) Champions

==== Results summary ====
Overall								Home						Away					
Pld	W	D	L	GF	GA	GD	Pts	W	D	L	GF	GA	GD	W	D	L	GF	GA	GD
34	23	9	2	73	20	+53	55	16	1	0	54	10	+44	7	8	2	19	10	+9

Source: Competitive matches

==== Results by Matchday ====
Round	1	2	3	4	5	6	7	8	9	10	11	12	13	14	15	16	17	18	19	20	21	22	23	24	25	26	27	28	29	30	31	32	33	34
Ground	A	H	A	H	A	A	H	A	H	A	H	A	H	H	A	H	A	H	A	H	A	H	H	A	H	A	H	A	H	A	A	H	A	H
Result	W	W	D	W	D	W	W	W	W	D	D	D	W	W	L	W	D	W	W	W	D	W	W	W	W	W	W	L	W	D	W	W	D	W
Position	4	1	4	3	3	3	2	3	2	2	2	2	2	1	3	3	3	3	2	2	2	2	2	2	1	1	1	2	2	2	2	2	2	2

Source: Competitive matches
A = Away; H = Home; W = Win; D = Draw; L = Loss; P = Postponed

==== Matches ====
29 September 1974 1	Panionios	0–2	AEK Athens	Nea Smyrni
16:00 EET (UTC+2)	Christodoulou (yellow card) 11'		Papaioannou 86', 90'	Stadium: Nea Smyrni Stadium; Attendance: 20,611; Referee: Nikos Zlatanos (Thessaloniki)

6 October 1974 2	AEK Athens	5–1	AEL	Nea Filadelfeia
16:00 EET (UTC+2)	Dedes 2', 81'; Zahnleiter 52'; Wagner 74', 88'		Mantzourakis 12'; Seitaridis (yellow card) 52'	Stadium: AEK Stadium; Attendance: 25,250; Referee: Christos Karasoulas (Athens)

20 October 1974 3	Panachaiki	0–0	AEK Athens	Patras
15:30 EET (UTC+2)			Nikolaou (red card) 32'; Stefanidis (yellow card) 66'	Stadium: Panachaiki Stadium; Attendance: 18,020; Referee: Stathis Papavasiliou (Piraeus)

27 October 1974 4	AEK Athens	2–0	Aris	Nea Filadelfeia
14:30 EET (UTC+2)	Papaioannou 35'; Ardizoglou (yellow card) 55'; Papadopoulos 63'		Chatzaras (yellow card) 14'; Pallas (red card) 56'	Stadium: AEK Stadium; Attendance: 24,957; Referee: Domenico Serafino (Italy)

3 November 1974 5	Kavala	0–0	AEK Athens	Kavala
14:30 EET (UTC+2)				Stadium: Kavala National Stadium; Attendance: 7,144; Referee: Dimitris Pantzalis (Piraeus)

10 November 1974 6	Olympiacos Volos	0–1	AEK Athens	Volos
14:30 EET (UTC+2)	Tsouknidas (yellow card) 10'; Papagiannis (yellow card) 85'		Skrekis (yellow card) 14'; Stefanidis (yellow card) 31'; Nikolaou 70'	Stadium: Volos Municipal Stadium; Attendance: 6,668; Referee: Pan Marinos (Piraeus)

24 November 1974 7	AEK Athens	3–1	Kalamata	Nea Filadelfeia
14:30 EET (UTC+2)	Wagner 36' (pen.); Papadopoulos 56'; Dedes 68'		Theodorou 58'	Stadium: AEK Stadium; Attendance: 8,015; Referee: Kostas Xanthos (Dodecanese)

1 December 1974 8	Iraklis	0–2	AEK Athens	Thessaloniki
14:30 EET (UTC+2)	Deligiannis (yellow card) 12'; Ronaldo (yellow card) 52'; Batakis (yellow card) 89'		Papaioannou 6'; Ravousis (yellow card) 18'; Papadopoulos (yellow card) 47'; Ardizoglou (yellow card) 63'; Zarzopoulos 74'	Stadium: Kaftanzoglio Stadium; Attendance: 14,532; Referee: Dionysis Voulgaris (Athens)

15 December 1974 9	AEK Athens	3–1	Egaleo	Nea Filadelfeia
14:30 EET (UTC+2)	Wagner 28', 49'; Zahnleiter 84'		Chastalis 68'; Pilavis (yellow card) 69'	Stadium: AEK Stadium; Attendance: 13,768; Referee: Kostas Krikonis (Epirus)

22 December 1974 10	Panathinaikos	0–0	AEK Athens	Ampelokipoi
14:45 EET (UTC+2)				Stadium: Leoforos Alexandras Stadium; Attendance: 24,510; Referee: Pan Marinos (Piraeus)

29 December 1974 11	AEK Athens	0–0	Olympiacos	Nea Filadelfeia
14:30 EET (UTC+2)				Stadium: AEK Stadium; Attendance: 28,518; Referee: Domenico Serafino (Italy)

5 January 1975 12	PAOK	1–1	AEK Athens	Thessaloniki
14:30 EET (UTC+2)	Kermanidis 20'		Wagner 2'	Stadium: Toumba Stadium; Attendance: 39,017; Referee: Achille Verbecke (France)

12 January 1975 13	AEK Athens	4–0	Atromitos	Nea Filadelfeia
14:30 EET (UTC+2)	Wagner 5', 25'; Konstantinou 28', (yellow card) 78'; Dedes 32'; Theodoridis (yellow card) 75' (yellow-red card) 75'		Taprantzis (yellow card) 61'	Stadium: AEK Stadium; Attendance: 20,825; Referee: Giannis Famelis (Athens)

19 January 1975 14	AEK Athens	4–0	Kastoria	Nea Filadelfeia
14:30 EET (UTC+2)	Papaioannou 20'; Wagner 35'; Dedes 58'; Zahnleiter 68'			Stadium: AEK Stadium; Attendance: 18,116; Referee: Timoleon Latsios (Larissa)

22 January 1975 15	Ethnikos Piraeus	1–0	AEK Athens	Piraeus
15:00 EET (UTC+2)	Calcaterra 36'; Karaiskos (yellow card) 72'		Ardizoglou (yellow card) 44'; Konstantinou (yellow card) 75'	Stadium: Karaiskakis Stadium; Attendance: 36,234; Referee: Jean Dubach (Switzerland)

26 January 1975 16	AEK Athens	3–0	PAS Giannina	Nea Filadelfeia
15:00 EET (UTC+2)	Bagias 66' (o.g.); Ardizoglou 79'; Vergos 86' (o.g.)			Stadium: AEK Stadium; Attendance: 25,462; Referee: Theodoros Tsanaklidis (Kavala)

2 February 1975 17	Panserraikos	1–1	AEK Athens	Serres
15:00 EET (UTC+2)	Seizis 21', (yellow card) 80'; Vavalis (red card) 26'		Dedes 81'	Stadium: Serres Municipal Stadium; Attendance: 5,916; Referee: Dimitris Pantzalis (Piraeus)

9 February 1975 18	AEK Athens	3–0	Panionios	Nea Filadelfeia
15:00 EET (UTC+2)	Dedes 27'; Papadopoulos 35'; Papaioannou 37'			Stadium: AEK Stadium; Attendance: 10,339; Referee: Chiotakis (Thessaloniki)

16 February 1975 19	AEL	0–2	AEK Athens	Larissa
15:00 EET (UTC+2)			Zarzopoulos 43'; Konstantinou 81'	Stadium: Alcazar Stadium; Attendance: 15,078; Referee: Giorgos Katsoras (Thessaloniki)

2 March 1975 20	AEK Athens	3–1	Panachaiki	Nea Filadelfeia
15:30 EET (UTC+2)	Wagner 31', 44'; Ardizoglou 75'		Sideris (yellow card) 76'; Pappas 85'	Stadium: AEK Stadium; Attendance: 26,492; Referee: Nikos Zlatanos (Thessaloniki)

9 March 1975 21	Aris	1–1	AEK Athens	Thessaloniki
16:00 EET (UTC+2)	Spyridon 15' (pen.)		Wagner (penalty missed) 8'; Dedes 75'	Stadium: Aris Stadium; Attendance: 13,317; Referee: Pan Marinos (Piraeus)

16 March 1975 22	AEK Athens	3–2	Kavala	Nea Filadelfeia
16:00 EET (UTC+2)	Konstantinou 16' (pen.); Ardizoglou 61'; Dedes 90'		Diamantopoulos 81'; Rigas 89'	Stadium: AEK Stadium; Attendance: 15,200; Referee: Michalis Kyriakidis (Cyprus)

23 March 1975 23	AEK Athens	3–0	Olympiacos Volos	Nea Filadelfeia
16:00 EET (UTC+2)	Dedes 29', 62'; Wagner 70'			Stadium: AEK Stadium; Attendance: 16,867; Referee: Moniakis (Heraklion)

29 March 1975 24	Kalamata	0–1	AEK Athens	Kalamata
15:30 EET (UTC+2)			Ardizoglou 55'	Stadium: Kalamata Municipal Stadium; Attendance: 5,547; Referee: Timoleon Latsios (Larissa)

6 April 1975 25	AEK Athens	3–0	Iraklis	Nea Filadelfeia
15:30 EEST (UTC+3)	Ardizoglou 14'; Papaioannou 51'; Tsamis 89'			Stadium: AEK Stadium; Attendance: 17,507; Referee: Theodoros Tsanaklidis (Kavala)

13 April 1975 26	Egaleo	1–4	AEK Athens	Aigaleo
17:30 EEST (UTC+3)	Chastalis 56' (pen.)		Dedes 12'; Ardizoglou 44', 49'; Zahnleiter 80'	Stadium: Stavros Mavrothalassitis Stadium; Attendance: 10,966; Referee: Michalis Ornerakis (Chania)

20 April 1975 27	AEK Athens	4–3	Panathinaikos	Nea Filadelfeia
17:30 EEST (UTC+3)	Wagner 32'; Papaioannou 38'; Skrekis (yellow card) 62'; Dedes 74'; Konstantinou 90+3' (pen.)		Antoniadis 58' (pen.), 84'; Filakouris 78'	Stadium: AEK Stadium; Attendance: 28,866; Referee: Theodoros Tsanaklidis (Kavala)

27 April 1975 28	Olympiacos	3–0	AEK Athens	Piraeus
17:30 EEST (UTC+3)	Karavitis 7' (pen.); Kritikopoulos (yellow card) 20', (goal) 49'; Losada (yellow card) 32'; Glezos (yellow card) 43'; Davourlis 72' (pen.)		Nikolaou (yellow card) 52'	Stadium: Karaiskakis Stadium; Attendance: 39,173; Referee: Riccardo Lattanzi (Italy)

5 May 1975 29	AEK Athens	3–1	PAOK	Nea Filadelfeia
17:30 EEST (UTC+3)	Nikolaou 28'; Wagner 57'; Ardizoglou 85'		Guerino 88'	Stadium: AEK Stadium; Attendance: 16,606; Referee: Papazoglou (Athens)

11 May 1975 30	Atromitos	2–2	AEK Athens	Peristeri
17:30 EEST (UTC+3)	Kotsalos 86'; Pantelidis 90'		Tsamis 10'; Ardizoglou 75'	Stadium: Peristeri Stadium; Attendance: 10,094; Referee: Christos Michas (Athens)

18 May 1975 31	Kastoria	0–2	AEK Athens	Kastoria
17:30 EEST (UTC+3)			Wagner 10', 43'	Stadium: Municipal Stadium of Kastoria; Attendance: 4,342; Referee: Moniakis (Heraklion)

25 May 1975 32	AEK Athens	3–0	Ethnikos Piraeus	Nea Filadelfeia
17:30 EEST (UTC+3)	Ardizoglou 11'; Wagner 86'; Konstantinou 87'			Stadium: AEK Stadium; Attendance: 15,597; Referee: Christos Michas (Athens)

1 June 1975 33	PAS Giannina	0–0	AEK Athens	Ioannina
17:30 EEST (UTC+3)				Stadium: Zosimades Stadium; Attendance: 7,000; Referee: Dimitris Sarakinos (Messinia)

8 June 1975 34	AEK Athens	5–0	Panserraikos	Nea Filadelfeia
18:00 EEST (UTC+3)	Papaioannou 19', 55'; Tsirikas 37' (o.g.); Konstantinou 72'; Dedes 74'			Stadium: AEK Stadium; Attendance: 7,417; Referee: Timoleon Latsios (Larissa)

=== Greek Cup ===
AEK Athens entered the Greek Cup at the Round of 32.

==== Matches ====
5 February 1975 Round of 32	Ethnikos Piraeus	0–2	AEK Athens	Piraeus
14:30 EET (UTC+2)	Chatziioannoglou (yellow card) 42'; Eleftheriadis (yellow card) 66'		Zahnleiter 31'; Wagner 74'	Stadium: Karaiskakis Stadium; Attendance: 24,465; Referee: Nicolae Petriceanu (Romania)

19 March 1975 Round of 16	AEK Athens	3–0	Kavala	Nea Filadelfeia
15:30 EET (UTC+2)	Wagner 11', 42'; Papaioannou 53'			Stadium: AEK Stadium; Attendance: 12,521; Referee: Dimitris Sarakinos (Messinia)

30 April 1975 Quarter-finals	Iraklis	1–0	AEK Athens	Thessaloniki
17:30 EEST (UTC+3)	Zafiridis (yellow card) 50'; Nikoloudis 76', (yellow card) 90'		Nikolaou (yellow card) 15'	Stadium: Kaftanzoglio Stadium; Attendance: 14,552; Referee: Gianfranco Menegali (Italy)

== Statistics ==
=== Squad statistics ===
As of 8 June 1975

No.	Pos	Player	Alpha Ethniki		Greek Cup		Total	
No.	Pos	Player	Apps	Goals	Apps	Goals	Apps	Goals
Goalkeepers
—	GK	(Argentina) Néstor Errea	0	0	0	0	0	0
—	GK	(Greece) Giorgos Sidiropoulos	29	0	3	0	32	0
—	GK	(Greece) Lakis Stergioudas	6	0	1	0	7	0
—	GK	(Greece) Giorgos Daditsos	0	0	0	0	0	0
Defenders
—	DF	(Greece) Giorgos Skrekis	19	0	1	0	20	0
—	DF	(Greece) Spyros Stefanidis	22	0	3	0	25	0
—	DF	(Greece) Apostolos Toskas	10	0	2	0	12	0
—	DF	(Greece) Lakis Nikolaou	32	2	3	0	35	2
—	DF	(Greece) Sakis Zarzopoulos	24	2	1	0	25	2
—	DF	(Greece) Stefanos Theodoridis	16	0	1	0	17	0
—	DF	(Greece) Victoras Theofilopoulos	0	0	0	0	0	0
—	DF	(Greece) Nikos Karoulias	0	0	0	0	0	0
—	DF	(Greece) Giorgos Kontopoulos	0	0	0	0	0	0
—	DF	(Greece) Petros Ravousis	22	0	1	0	23	0
Midfielders
—	MF	(Greece) Giorgos Lavaridis	1	0	0	0	1	0
—	MF	(West Germany) Timo Zahnleiter	30	4	2	1	32	5
—	MF	(Cyprus) Takis Timotheou	0	0	0	0	0	0
—	MF	(Greece) Lazaros Papadopoulos	16	3	2	0	18	3
—	MF	(Greece) Dionysis Tsamis	32	2	3	0	35	2
—	MF	(Greece) Vangelis Makos	0	0	0	0	0	0
—	MF	(Greece) Christos Ardizoglou	31	10	3	0	34	10
Forwards
—	FW	(Greece) Mimis Papaioannou	33	10	3	1	36	11
—	FW	(Greece) Georgios Dedes	33	14	3	0	36	14
—	FW	(West Germany) Walter Wagner	34	17	3	3	37	20
—	FW	(Cyprus) Tasos Konstantinou	24	6	2	0	26	6
—	FW	(Uruguay) Jorge Falero Fanìs	1	0	1	0	2	0

=== Goalscorers ===
As of 8 June 1975
The list is sorted by competition order when total goals are equal, then by position and then alphabetically by surname.

Rank	Pos.	Player	Alpha Ethniki	Greek Cup	Total
1	FW	(West Germany) Walter Wagner	17	3	20
2	FW	(Greece) Georgios Dedes	14	0	14
3	FW	(Greece) Mimis Papaioannou	10	1	11
4	MF	(Greece) Christos Ardizoglou	10	0	10
5	FW	(Cyprus) Tasos Konstantinou	6	0	6
7	MF	(West Germany) Timo Zahnleiter	4	1	5
8	MF	(Greece) Lazaros Papadopoulos	3	0	3
9	DF	(Greece) Lakis Nikolaou	2	0	2
9	DF	(Greece) Sakis Zarzopoulos	2	0	2
9	MF	(Greece) Dionysis Tsamis	2	0	2
Own goals			3	0	3
Totals			73	5	78

=== Clean sheets ===
As of 8 June 1975
The list is sorted by competition order when total clean sheets are equal and then alphabetically by surname. Clean sheets in games where both goalkeepers participated are awarded to the goalkeeper who started the game. Goalkeepers with no appearances are not included.

Rank	Player	Alpha Ethniki	Greek Cup	Total
1	(Greece) Giorgos Sidiropoulos	16	2	18
2	(Greece) Lakis Stergioudas	4	0	4
Totals		20	2	22

=== Disciplinary record ===
As of 8 June 1975

N	P	Nat.	Name	Alpha Ethniki			Greek Cup			Total			Notes
N	P	Nat.	Name	Yellow card	Second yellow card	Red card	Yellow card	Second yellow card	Red card	Yellow card	Second yellow card	Red card	Notes
Goalkeepers
—	GK	(Argentina)	Néstor Errea										
—	GK	(Greece)	Giorgos Sidiropoulos										
—	GK	(Greece)	Lakis Stergioudas										
—	GK	(Greece)	Giorgos Daditsos										
Defenders
—	DF	(Greece)	Giorgos Skrekis	2						2			
—	DF	(Greece)	Spyros Stefanidis	2						2			
—	DF	(Greece)	Apostolos Toskas										
—	DF	(Greece)	Lakis Nikolaou	1		1	1			2		1	
—	DF	(Greece)	Sakis Zarzopoulos										
—	DF	(Greece)	Stefanos Theodoridis	2	1					2	1		
—	DF	(Greece)	Victoras Theofilopoulos										
—	DF	(Greece)	Nikos Karoulias										
—	DF	(Greece)	Giorgos Kontopoulos										
—	DF	(Greece)	Petros Ravousis	1						1			
Midfielders
—	MF	(Greece)	Giorgos Lavaridis										
—	MF	(West Germany)	Timo Zahnleiter										
—	MF	(Cyprus)	Takis Timotheou										
—	MF	(Greece)	Lazaros Papadopoulos	1						1			
—	MF	(Greece)	Dionysis Tsamis										
—	MF	(Greece)	Vangelis Makos										
—	MF	(Greece)	Christos Ardizoglou	3						3			
Forwards
—	FW	(Greece)	Mimis Papaioannou										
—	FW	(Greece)	Georgios Dedes										
—	FW	(West Germany)	Walter Wagner										
—	FW	(Cyprus)	Tasos Konstantinou	1						1			
—	FW	(Uruguay)	Jorge Falero Fanìs										

=== Starting 11 ===
This section presents the most frequently used formation along with the players with the most starts across all competitions.

N.	Formation	Matchday(s)
24	4–4–2	12–25, 27–31, 33, 34
13	4–3–3	1–11, 26, 32

Nat.	Player	Pos.
(Greece)	Giorgos Sidiropoulos	GK
(Greece)	Sakis Zarzopoulos	RCB
(Greece)	Lakis Nikolaou	LCB
(Greece)	Spyros Stefanidis	RB
(Greece)	Christos Ardizoglou	LB
(Greece)	Dionysis Tsamis	RDM
(West Germany)	Timo Zahnleiter	LDM
(Cyprus)	Tasos Konstantinou	RM
(Greece)	Georgios Dedes	LM
(West Germany)	Walter Wagner	RCF
(Greece)	Mimis Papaioannou (C)	LCF

Last updated: 1975-06-08
