= Mimis Papaioannou =

Greek footballer and manager (1942–2023)

- Mimis Papaioannou with AEK Athens.

Personal information
- Full name: Dimitrios Papaioannou
- Date of birth: 17 November 1942
- Place of birth: Nea Nikomideia, Veria, Greece
- Date of death: 15 March 2023 (aged 80)
- Place of death: Athens, Greece
- Height: 1.68 m (5 ft 6 in)
- Positions: Forward; attacking midfielder

Youth career
- 1957–1959: Nea Genea Nikomideia

Senior career*
Years	Team	Apps	(Gls)
1959–1962	Veria	84	(40)
1962–1979	AEK Athens	481	(236)
1979	Western Suburbs	8	(4)
1979–1982	New York Pancyprian-Freedoms	17	(5)
Total		590	(285)

International career
1962–1965	Greece military	7	(4)
1963–1978	Greece	61	(21)

Managerial career
- 1981–1986: New York Pancyprian-Freedoms
- 1986–1987: Kerkyra
- 1987–1988: Edessaikos
- 1988–1989: Olympiacos Chalkida
- 1989–1990: AE Kos
- 1990–1991: Pannafpliakos
- 1991–1992: Evgeros
- 1992–1994: Greece (assistant)
Medal record
Men's football
Representing Greece
World Military Cup
Winner	1962
Winner	1963
- * Club domestic league appearances and goals

Dimitrios "Mimis" Papaioannou (Greek: Δημήτριος "Μίμης" Παπαϊωάννου; 17 November 1942 – 15 March 2023) was a Greek professional footballer, who played as a forward, mostly for AEK Athens and a manager. Widely regarded as the greatest Greek footballer of his generation and one of the best players of all time in Greece, as he was named the best Greek footballer of the 20th century by the IFFHS.

A skillful striker who was later converted into an attacking midfielder, due to technical abilities, Papaioannou was characterized by his technique, dribbling abilities, physical strength, versatility in his finishing and his jumping skills that allowed him to stay in the air longer than his opponents. Throughout his playing career, Papaioannou was never shown a single red card, while he was booked with a yellow card only three times. Papaioannou played for AEK for 17 seasons and won five league titles and three Greek Cups, including a domestic double in 1978. He is the club's all-time top scorer and by the time he left AEK he was also the all-time top scorer of the Greek championship, but today he is in the third place. He is the player of AEK with the second most appearances in all competitions and the first in league appearances. His nickname was "the Vlach" (Greek: "ο Βλάχος"), due to his family origins.

In his international career, Papaioannou was part of the Greek military team that won the World Military Cup in 1962 and 1963. With Greece he earned 61 caps and scored 21 goals, becoming their top scorer until 1986 and now he is the 5th on the all-time scorers list. In 2021, the IFFHS also selected him in Greece's best XI of all time.

In 1982 Papaioannou, became the manager for New York Pancyprian-Freedoms, where he won both the league and the Cup, claiming the domestic double. From 1986 to 1991 he managed Kerkyra, Edessaikos, Olympiacos Chalkida, AE Kos and Pannafpliakos. In 1991 he coached the local club Evgeros at Kefalonia for a season. He also served as an assistant of Alketas Panagoulias at the bench of Greece for 2 years.

== Early life ==
Papaioannou was born on 17 November 1942 at Nea Nikomideia of Imathia. His father, Kostas was the curator of the local football club, Nea Genea, thus the young Papaioannou came in touch with football from an early age. His football talent began to shine from early on, while his love for the sport was unquestionable. His love of football and the financial difficulties of his family forced him to leave school early and split his time between the pitch and the barber shop of the village, where he worked as an assistant.

== Club career ==
=== Early career ===
At the age of 15 he joined Nea Genea Nikomideia and competed in their offense. Word of his talent quickly spread across the capital of the prefecture and the officials of Veria. As a result, in 1959, the 17-year-old Papaioannou was eventually transferred to them. That period the manager of PAOK, Žarko Mihajlović selected him, alongside other youngsters from Northern Greece who weren't under contract with the club, to represent PAOK's academy at the Viareggio youth tournament. His appearances for the "Queen of North" attracted the interest of the major clubs of Thessaloniki, but also of the then manager of AEK Athens, Tryfon Tzanetis. The offers of the clubs of Thessaloniki failed to meet the demands of Veria with his transfer to PAOK collapsing over a difference of 20,000 drachmas. In 1962, Tzanetis suggested and persuaded the president of AEK, Nikos Goumas to offer 175,000 drachmas to the team and 25,000 drachmas to the 19-year-old player for his transfer to their club. The young striker of refugee origin was hesitant. On one hand there was his sporting sympathy for the Northern Greece, PAOK and the neighboring move to Thessaloniki, while on the other AEK Athens offered greater prestige and significantly more money, which was important for his family, despite requiring a move to the distant Athens. Eventually, after the advice of the president of Veria, Kostas Vorgiatzidis, Papaioannou chose the club of Athens.

=== AEK Athens ===
==== 1962–1963 ====
In the summer of 1962, the 20-year-old Papaioannou was transferred to AEK Athens. He was the player that AEK had been seeking to pair up with Kostas Nestoridis and lead the club in claiming leagues. Alongside Nestoridis they formed one of the strongest offensive duos in Greek football. On 27 September 1962 he scored his first goal on his debut in a 7–2 triumph against Egaleo. He scored in the derby against Olympiacos at Karaiskakis Stadium, in the 3–1 victory on 23 December 1962, while he also scored in the same match of the second round. At the end of the season, AEK were tied at the 1st place with Panathinaikos and the title was decided in a play-off match on 23 June 1963. Papaioannou scored twice, Nestoridis also scored from a direct corner kick and after a 3–3 draw according to the regulations of the time, the title was awarded to the team with the best goal ratio in the regular season. The 3 goals scored by the two clubs and the total goal difference of 66–21, led AEK to win the league after 23 years. As Papaioannou later recalled, seeing his teammates crying in the dressing room after winning the title made him deeply identify with the club's values, and from that moment he became a supporter of AEK.

==== 1963–1965 ====
The upcoming years for AEK and Papaioannou were highly successful, as he gradually emerged as the team's leader following Nestoridis in the team, pushing them as high as he could to lead them to success. His appearances and achievements quickly established him as a fan favourite. The supporters adored him for his passion for the team. On 29 September 1963 he scored a brace in the away defeat with 5–4 against Panathinaikos. He scored his first hat-trick on 16 October 1963, in a 3–0 victory over Aris at home. It did not take him long to score another, as he did two months later against Ethnikos Piraeus in a 4–0 win. Papaioannou scored a goal in the imposing 6–1 against Olympiacos on 6 January 1964. He also scored four of the total of seven goals of his team against Anagennisi Arta for the Cup, on 26 April 1964. At the end of the season, he won his first Cup with AEK, even though the final was cancelled due to the suspension of the semi-finalists, Panathinaikos and Olympiacos from the competition. In 1964 he ended the season as the league's top scorer with 29 goals, ending the 5-year winning streak of Nestoridis.

On 31 January 1965, Papaioannou scored a hat-trick against Panachaiki in a 6–0 home win for the league. He also scored the winner in an episodic derby against Olympiacos away from home, that ended 2–1 for AEK. He scored again with the same opponent, opening the score in a 3–3 draw at home, on the final matchday.

==== Career break and singing ====
On 12 May 1965, AEK played a friendly against Real Madrid at Nea Filadelfeia that ended 3–3, with Papaioannou scoring a brace. Watching his performance, the star player of the Merengues, Ferenc Puskás suggested to the administration of Real the acquisition of the Greek forward the following day. This initiated conversations for the transfer between both clubs in July. Real Madrid, through Raimundo Saporta offered 4,000,000 drachmas to AEK and 750,000 drachmas to Papaioannou for his transfer to Madrid. The proposal of the Blancos was unrealistic for the Greek standards of the time. The lucrative offer and the prospect of a football career in Spain, beyond the standards of Greek football at the time greatly appealed to Papaioannou, but was never fulfilled, since the administration of AEK rejected the offer due to their fear of the reaction of the supporters to a possible departure of their star player. Nevertheless, Papaioannou was willing to leave AEK under the given punishment of a one-year ban and then sign as free agent at Real, but the Spaniards refused, as they didn't want to disrupt their relations with the Greek club.

Embittered by the administration's attitude, Papaioannou refused to join the club's activities and stayed at Nea Nikomideia, demanding payment of the club's debts to him plus an additional fee. In the end of the summer, after he was promised a settlement of the debts to him by the administration, he returned to the activies of AEK for a while, but since those promises were not fullfilled, he left again for Nea Nikomideia in October. In that period he was on the verge of abandoning football for financial reasons, when he was approached by a folk composer and bouzouki player Christos Nikolopoulos, who brought him in contact with Stelios Kazantzidis. Papaioannou and Kazantzidis had mutual respect and admiration for each other's virtues with the latter discovering that Papaioannou, apart from his footballing skills, had also a fine singing voice and suggested him to join his tour in Germany with Marinella. Papaioannou accepted and traveled to Germany, singing to the Greek immigrants of the country. During the tour he attracted the interest of VfB Stuttgart. After two months and despite the singing ability of Papaioannou, Kazantzidis, believing his retirement from football would be a major loss, persuaded him to return to AEK.

On 15 December he returned to Greece after the end of the tour and went to the club in order to negotiate the future of his football career. Two days later, he agreed to stay at the club, with the administration formally undertaking to grant him a transfer the following year, with a penalty clause of 500,000 drachmas in case this did not happen. Nevertheless, in parallel with football, he continued singing with Kazantzidis and Marinella in Athens for a few years, but his career was limited to the recording of seven songs by Kazantzidis and Nikolopoulos between 1971 and 1972. Among them was the recording on 19 June 1971 of the famous "Hymn of AEK" to music by Stelios Kazantzidis and lyrics by Christos Kolokotronis.

==== 1965–1966 ====
Upon returning to AEK and football, Papaioannou became the leader of the team, following the departure of Nestoridis a few months later. In his first match after his return, on 19 December 1965, he scored in the 3–2 of the yellow-blacks over Panathinaikos at Leoforos Alexandras Stadium. Papaioannou scored five hat-tricks in this season: one in a 6–0 victory against Niki Volos on 6 March 1966, the other against PAOK in a 5–1 win, against Panionios with the same score against Egaleo with the score reaching 4–1 and against Edessaikos for the Cup. He also scored in the derby against Panathinaikos on 3 April 1966, but his goal didn't count as the match was suspended and eventually awarded to the greens. At the end of the season, he emerged again as the league's top scorer with 23 goals.

==== 1966–1967 ====
The next season Papaioannou led the double-headed eagle in the final of the Balkans Cup scoring two goals against Lokomotiv Sofia, two goals against Farul Constanța and one goal against Vardar. In the first leg of the final in October 1967 against Fenerbahçe, his goal in their 2–1 victory, was not enough in claiming the title, as the Turkish equalized on aggregate in the second leg and sent the tie to a decider match in 1968 which they also won by 3–1, where Papaioannou was the scorer for his team. Papaioannou also scored once in the away defeat against Braga, for the UEFA Cup Winners' Cup, on 5 October 1966. On 29 January 1967 he scored the decider against Olympiacos in the dying minutes, while in the same match of the second round, he opened the score in the final 1–1 away draw.

==== 1967–1968 ====
On 22 October 1967 scored the equalizer in a 1–1 draw against Panathinaikos. On 12 November he scored a hat-trick against Panserraikos in a 4–0 win at home. Papaioannou scored a brace at the away 4–1 victory against Olympiacos. He scored his second hat-trick of the season, on 21 January 1968, against Vyzas Megara in a 6–1 home win. He also scored the winner in a 2–1 win over Panathinaikos. For the 1967–68 Balkans Cup, he scored in a 3–3 draw against Olimpija Ljubljana. Papaioannou celebrated his second Championship with AEK at the end of the season, while also getting them to the European Cup, for the first time in their history.

==== 1968–1969 ====
On 18 September 1968, Papaioannou scored in AEK's first win in the European Cup, opening the score in the 3–0 over Jeunesse Esch. On 27 October 1968 in the derby against Olympiacos at Faliro, AEK were leading by 3–2 with Papaioannou having scored once and by the end of the match their goalkeeper, Serafidis was sent-off after kicking Sideris. The manager Branko Stanković decided not to make his remaining substitution and sent Papaioannou to play under the posts for the remaining five minutes of the match. Papaioannou kept a clean sheet for the remainder of the match and he even made two saves. On 3 November 1968 he scored the fastest hat-trick ever achieved by an AEK player within 12 minutes, in the 5–2 win against Chalkida. As AEK advanced in the second round of the European Cup, he scored with an impressive header, at their first away win in the tournament by 2–0, for the 2nd leg against AB, securing the club's qualification to quarter-finals. After successfully leading the yellow-blacks to the European Cup quarter-finals, he scored equalizing the score in the second leg against Spartak Trnava, but the goal that would send them to the extra time after 2–1 loss at home, never came and AEK were eliminated. At the time, it was the deepest run by a Greek club in European competition. On 14 May 1969 he scored another hat-trick at a Cup match against Lamia in a 5–0 win.

==== 1969–1971 ====
On 8 February 1970, Papaioannou won his team the match against Olympiacos at home, by scoring the only goal of the match. In the round of 32 of the Cup on 22 March, he opened the score against Panathinaikos, while also having a shot hit the crossbar, in an episodic 1–1 draw. The qualification was eventually decided at penalties where AEK lost by 5–3 with Papaioannou missing his penalty.

On 30 September 1970 he scored four goals in a 10–0 triumph against the lower division side, Agia Eleousa for the Cup. The double-headed eagle made their highest scoring victory in the league on 4 December 1970, beating Veria by 8–2, with Papaioannou scoring a hat-trick to his former club. On 7 March 1971 he scored again a hat-trick against EPA Larnaca in a 3–0 win at home and three weeks later he scored another one in the 4–0 victory over OFI. Papaioannou led his club to the conquest of another championship, where he lost the top scorer award by a single goal from Georgios Dedes, scoring 27 goals in the league.

==== 1971–1974 ====
The following season, he scored in both league matches against Olympiacos equalizing in the matches that both ended in 1–1. Papaioannou scored in the important 3–2 home win against Inter Milan on 29 September 1971, for the 2nd leg of the first round of the European Cup.

From the previous season AEK were beginning to struggle financially and the administrative disputes that appeared within the club, resulted in a series of issues. Those issues marked the start of a declining period for AEK. In 1973 the club finished 5th and did not qualify for any European competition, while Stanković was sacked midseason. Papaioannou continued to lead the club during these hard times, as they had a decent presence in the UEFA Cup, where they reached the second round and were eliminated by the renowned Liverpool of Bill Shankly.

AΕΚ continued their bad campaigns, as they finished in 5th place for the second consecutive year, while in the Cup they were eliminated at the round of 16. It was characteristic that the situation at the club was affecting the performances of Papaioannou, as he recorded his lowest until then performance, with 7 goals in all competitions.

==== 1974–1976 ====
As the presidency of the club passed to Loukas Barlos, the team entered a highly successful period, with Papaioannou leading the club to titles and distinctions. In a competitive regeneration of the team under František Fadrhonc and with the transfers of Walter Wagner, Christos Ardizoglou and Georgios Dedes in their offense, Papaioannou raised his performances. He scored in a 4–3 victory against Panathinaikos on 20 April 1975. In the first season under the new management, AEK managed to finish second in the league, just two points behind Olympiacos.

In the next season, AEK faced Vojvodina in the first round of the UEFA Cup, where Papaioannou scored once in the 3–1 win of the second leg, on 1 October 1975. On 2 November 1975, he scored a hat-trick in the Cup match, where AEK prevailed over Agios Dimitrios with 7–0. One week later, with his two goals Papaioannou, made the 2–0 win, in the away match against Olympiacos.

==== 1976–1977 ====
In the summer of 1976 after the yellow-blacks were strengthened by the additions of Nikos Christidis, Takis Nikoloudis and most importantly Thomas Mavros, they played highly effective offensive football. Fadrhonc, considering the playing intelligence and high technical qualities in the playing style of Papaioannou, decided to relocate him as a "classic number 10" in order to fit all the great attackers the club had to offer. Papaioannou responded successfully as a playmaker, while maintaining his scoring abilities. In the first round of the UEFA Cup, AEK faced Dynamo Moscow, where Papaioannou scored in the 2–0 of the first leg on 15 September 1976. In the episodic second leg on 29 September 1976 that was sent to the extra time, after AEK won a penalty in the last minute and Konstantinou went to take it. Following the instruction by Papaioannou to finish the job, calmly sent the ball into the net and the goalkeeper in the opposite direction. After beating Derby County in both legs of the second round and became the first club in the history of the European tournaments to achieve a victory in English ground, they faced Red Star Belgrade, where Papaioannou opened the score in the first leg on the 2–0 victory on 24 November 1976. On 30 January, before the home match against Atromitos, Barlos awarded him with the golden double-headed eagle, which was the team's highest honor in those years. In the quarter-finals he helped his team tie the 3–0 defeat of the first leg against QPR, scoring a goal in the regular time and sending the match to penalties. He scored the winning penalty leading the club to the semi-finals. AEK Athens remarkable campaign in the UEFA Cup ended after losing to the legendary Juventus of Giovanni Trapattoni, who eventually won the tournament.

==== 1977–1978 ====
In the next season the acquisition of Dušan Bajević and the formation of an outstanding attacking duo with Thomas Mavros, while Papaioannou orchestrated the attack, made the team's offense unstoppable. Fadrhonc was sacked at the beginning of the season after three years of presence, but his replacement Zlatko Čajkovski also did an excellent job. On 28 September 1977 he scored in the second leg of the first round of the UEFA Cup against ASA Târgu Mureș, where AEK qualified with a score of 3–0, while at the second round their campaign was cut short by Standard Liège. At the end of the season, with Papaioannou as their captain, they completed the domestic double with relative ease as they won the league with just two defeats and they went undefeated in the Cup, beating Panathinaikos in the second round, tearing apart Olympiacos by 6–1 in the semi-finals and prevailing against PAOK by 2–0 in the final.

==== 1978–1979 ====
After a completely successful season, Barlos having taken the approval of Papaioannou added to the star roster of the club the other "Mimis", sigining the former captain of Panathinaikos, Mimis Domazos alongside Ferenc Puskás, as their new manager, who both led the "greens" to the 1971 European Cup final. During the season AEK were highly prolific offensively and had only three defeats in the league, winning their opponents apart with large margin scores and achieving the best offense of the league with 90 goals. The advanced age of Papaioannou and the great performances of his teammates, did not allow him to be the lead player of the club for yet another season. He passed that role to Mavros, who at the end of the season emerged as the top scorer in the league with 31 goals and 40 in total in the season, winning the European Silver Shoe, just three goals behind Kees Kist. Under Andreas Stamatiadis, who took charge of the team after the sacking of Puskás, Papaioannou won his last Championship with AEK after they were tied in first place with Olympiacos and the latter did not show up for the play-off match, that was set for the title. However, AEK lost the chance to win a second domestic double in a row as they lost the Cup final to Panionios, who overturned the early 1–0 lead of the "yellow-blacks" and won the match by 3–1, lifting the first Cup in their history. That season was the last of Papaioannou at the club. On 6 June 1979, AEK organized a friendly match at Nea Filadelfeia against PAOK in his honour. Players from the elite of the Greek football, such as Vasilis Hatzipanagis, Antonis Antoniadis and Georgios Firos, as well as foreign players, such as Walter Schachner and Kurt Jara, wore the yellow-black jersey to honour Papaioannou, in a 3–2 loss by the club of Thessaloniki.

Papaioannou was an emblematic and the most effective leader of the club, who led them to five Championships and three Cups, including a domestic double in 1978. He has been for AEK and Greek football a symbol of morale and loyalty to the club, playing at the same club for over a decade and was never shown a red card in his entire career, while he was booked with a yellow card only three times. In his 17-year spell with AEK, he became the club's all-time top scorer and by the time he left AEK he was also the league's all-time top scorer, a record broken 11 years later by Mavros. Papaioannou today is the 3rd place of the all-time top scorers of the Greek Championship. He holds the club record of most goals scored in the derbies against Panathinaikos with 10 goals, while he is second, behind Mavros at the same record in the derbies against Olympiacos with 14 goals. He was the player with the most appearances in all official competitions with the double-headed eagle, until he was surpassed by Stelios Manolas, however Papaioannou holds record of the matches played in league with 480 appearances. Until today, he is sixth in appearances for the Greek Championship.

=== Later career ===
==== Western Suburbs ====
After leaving AEK in the summer of 1979, the 37-year-old Papaioannou, following the steps of Nestoridis, traveled to Australia and signed with Western Suburbs, who were playing in the first division of the Victorian Metropolitan League. He played the remaining fixtures of the league and helped his club to win first place, getting their promotion to the Victorian State League.

==== New York Pancyprian-Freedoms ====
After the end of the league in September, he moved in the United States to play for the New York Pancyprian-Freedoms. He completed the domestic double in 1980, as he won the Cosmopolitan Soccer League and the National Challenge Cup. In 1981 he took charge of the club as a player-manager. Even though he was approaching the age of 40, he attracted the interest of NASL clubs, but he had already decided to retire as a footballer at the end of the year, which he eventually did in 1982.

== International career ==
Papaioannou was part of the Greek military team from 1962 to 1965. He won two consecutive times the World Military Cup in 1962 and 1963.

Papaioannou was capped 61 times with Greece scoring 21 goals becoming their top scorer, at the time. His record was surpassed in 1986 by Anastopoulos surpassed him in 1986 and he remains among the top 5 goalscorers. His debut was on 27 November 1963 in a friendly away 3–1 loss against Cyprus, under Tzanetis. Although it was his first international match, he was the captain of the team.

== Managerial career ==
Papaioannou, after two seasons as a footballer for New York Pancyprian-Freedoms, took over the wheel of the team as a player-manager in 1981 for a year and after retiring as a footballer in 1982, he continued as their manager. He remained at the club until 1986, where he won another domestic double in 1982 and a second consecutive National Challenge Cup in 1983.

After his return to Greece in 1986, he coached Kerkyra, Edessaikos, Olympiacos Chalkida, AE Kos and Pannafpliakos, respectively within 5 seasons. In 1991 Papaioannou moved to Kefalonia, where he was active professionally and simultaneously coached the local club of Evgeros for a season, where they won promotion from the local championships to the fourth division.

Afterwards, he coached divisions of the national team of Greece and from 1992 was at the side of Alketas Panagoulias in the men's team, as an assistant, until the end of the 1994 FIFA World Cup.

== Personal life ==
Papaioannou was the uncle of the former footballer Christos Kalaitzidis, who also played for AEK.

In January 1999, the achievements of Papaioannou were recognized by the IFFHS, where he was named the Greatest Greek Footballer of the 20th Century.

On 11 October 2000 a friendly match was organised in his honour with the veterans of AEK Athens playing against those of Germany. In front of approximately 2,000 supporters of AEK, big names such as Gerd Müller (as manager), Bernd Schuster, Dieter Burdenski, Holger Fach, Alois Reinhardt, Thomas Berthold, Bernd Förster, Uli Borowka, Rüdiger Abramczik, Michael Schulz, Miroslav Votava, Rudi Bommer, Walter Kelsch and Günther Herrmann were present. From the Greek side, players from different eras of AEK such as Stelios Serafidis, Lakis Stergioudas, Giorgos Daditsos, Lakis Nikolaou, Stefanos Theodoridis, Stavros Letsas, Apostolos Toskas, Stelios Manolas, Lampros Georgiadis, Dimitris Saravakos, Christos Ardizoglou, Giorgos Kefalidis, Giorgos Peppes, Giorgos Karafeskos, Lysandros Georgamlis, Nikos Pias, Toni Savevski (as an active footballer), Michalis Simigdalas, Panagiotis Stylianopoulos, Takis Nikoloudis, Andreas Karakidis, Dimitris Kokkinopoulos and Giannis Theocharidis competed. The match ended 5–1 in favour of the Germans, where Papaioannou got to play for 35 minutes in a celebratory atmosphere in his honour. He was honored by president of Panathinaikos, Angelos Filippidis, Giorgos Koudas from PAOK, the presidents of AEK and Amateur AEK, Cornelius Sierhuis and Giannis Granitsas, Ilias Atmatsidis from the footballers of AEK, as well as the Sport's Minister, Giorgos Floridis.

His autobiography was published in 2002 under the title "Date in the air" (Greek: "Ραντεβού στον αέρα") by Ellinika Grammata publications. He also visited schools and gave speeches about football, while he presented in tournaments held for school students. Papaioannou also competed with the veterans of AEK and played football on a five-a-side football pitch to keep in shape. His wax figure is in the new Agia Sophia Stadium museum with other wax effigies of people who have connected their name with AEK from various positions. His name also is honoured on one of the four pillars of the Stadium, alongside other important figures of the club's history such as Kostas Nestoridis, Stelios Serafidis and Thomas Mavros.

== Death ==
On 15 March 2023, Papaioannou died at the age of 80 after a long-term struggle with health issues. His funeral took place on 17 March at Nea Filadelfeia, where many prominent figures of Greek football attended to pay their respects. At the same time, at the Agia Sophia Stadium, the flags were waving at half mast, while the figure of Papaioannou was placed on the external matrix of the stadium.

On 19 March, in the home match against Panathinaikos, the stadium screens displayed clips from past interviews, while the team's anthem was playing and before the start of the match the supporters of AEK raised a card stunt in his memory. Afterwards, a minute of silence was held in the center of the pitch by the people of both teams.

== Style of play ==
"I can include him into Europe's best players. He truly was such a quality player and that's not a compliment, that's the truth."

— Branko Stanković on Papaioannou.

The playing style of Papaioannou was characterized by technical ability, dribbling, strength and versatile finishing, scoring spectacular goals, that made him a difficult opponent to play against. His preferred foot was his left, but he scored with both legs. He had a unique jumping ability, staying in the air longer than his opponents and beat them in aerial duels. Despite his small stature of 1.68 metres, he scored over 50 headers in official matches. His headers were described as "shots with the head". Οn 12 May 1965, at the 46th minute, during the 3–3 draw in a friendly match against Real Madrid, the central defender José Santamaría was stunned, not believing that the Greek player had just jumped "to the stars" and sent the ball into the net, making the score 3–1. Papaioannou was exceptionally good at free-kicks and he also scored twice from direct corner kicks. His leadership skills and ability to inspire his teammates resulted in making the team give everything they got on the pitch. His playing intelligence and technical ability got him to be converted from a striker to an attacking midfielder, considering his physical condition at the time and in order to fit in with all the great players in the team's offense. He adapted quickly in his new role, while the change of his position kept him in a high level, as despite his offensive skills, he also had good through passes and crosses, creating a lot of scoring chances for his teammates.

== Singing career ==
Seven songs featuring the voice of Papaioannou were recorded on Polyphone during the period 1971–1972 with the collaboration of Christos Nikolopoulos and Stelios Kazantzidis:

1. Mes ti fotia mou (Μες τη φωτιά μου) - Stelios Kazantzidis, G. Vasilopoulos (1971)
2. A.E.K. - Hymn of AEK (Α.Ε.Κ. - Ύμνος της ΑΕΚ) - Stelios Kazantzidis, Christos Kolokotronis (recorded 19 June 1971)
3. San pouli kinigimeno (Σαν πουλί κυνηγημένο) - Stelios Kazantzidis, G. Vasilopoulos (1971)
4. Eho elattomata (Έχω ελαττώματα) - Christos Nikolopoulos, Pythagoras (1971)
5. San theatrinos (Σαν θεατρίνος) - Stelios Kazantzidis, Evangelos Atraidis (1972)
6. Ftanoun i pikres (Φτάνουν οι πίκρες) - Stelios Kazantzidis, Evangelos Atraidis (1972)
7. Martyres i pikres mou (Μάρτυρες οι πίκρες μου) - Christos Nikolopoulos, G. Vasilopoulos (1972)

== Career statistics ==
=== Club ===
Appearances and goals by club, season and competition
Club	Season	League (Note: Includes the 1963 championship play-off.)			Greek Cup		Europe		Balkans Cup		Total	
Club	Season	Division	Apps	Goals	Apps	Goals	Apps	Goals	Apps	Goals	Apps	Goals
AEK Athens	1962–63	Alpha Ethniki	31	18	2	1	0	0	0	0	33	19
AEK Athens	1963–64	Alpha Ethniki	28	29	4	5	1	0	0	0	33	34
AEK Athens	1964–65	Alpha Ethniki	30	13	3	1	1	1	0	0	34	15
AEK Athens	1965–66	Alpha Ethniki	25	23 (Note: His goal against Panathinaikos on 3 April 1966 did not count as the match was suspended.)	3	5	0	0	0	0	28	28
AEK Athens	1966–67	Alpha Ethniki	22	10	3	3	2	1	9	8	36	22
AEK Athens	1967–68	Alpha Ethniki	27	19	3	1	0	0	4	1	34	21
AEK Athens	1968–69	Alpha Ethniki	33	20	2	4	6	3	0	0	41	27
AEK Athens	1969–70	Alpha Ethniki	32	18	1	1	0	0	0	0	33	19
AEK Athens	1970–71	Alpha Ethniki	34	27	8	10	2	0	0	0	44	37
AEK Athens	1971–72	Alpha Ethniki	28	12	3	4	2	1	0	0	33	17
AEK Athens	1972–73	Alpha Ethniki	21	7	3	3	4	0	0	0	28	10
AEK Athens	1973–74	Alpha Ethniki	24	7	2	0	0	0	0	0	26	7
AEK Athens	1974–75	Alpha Ethniki	33	10	3	1	0	0	0	0	36	11
AEK Athens	1975–76	Alpha Ethniki	30	11	4	3	4	1	0	0	38	15
AEK Athens	1976–77	Alpha Ethniki	30	3	2	2	10	3	0	0	42	8
AEK Athens	1977–78	Alpha Ethniki	31	7	5	1	3	1	0	0	39	9
AEK Athens	1978–79	Alpha Ethniki	22	2	3	0	0	0	0	0	25	2
Career total			481	236	54	45	35	11	13	9	583	301

=== International ===
Appearances and goals by national team and year
National team	Year	Apps	Goals
Greece	1963	1	0
Greece	1964	5	6
Greece	1965	4	3
Greece	1966	1	0
Greece	1967	5	1
Greece	1968	3	2
Greece	1969	7	1
Greece	1970	6	2
Greece	1971	5	1
Greece	1972	5	0
Greece	1973	1	0
Greece	1974	4	2
Greece	1975	5	1
Greece	1976	3	1
Greece	1977	3	1
Greece	1978	3	0
Total		61	21

Scores and results list Greece's goal tally first, score column indicates score after each Papaioannou goal.

List of international goals scored by Mimis Papaioannou
No.	Date	Venue	Opponent	Score	Result	Competition
1	12 February 1964	Stamford Bridge, London, England	Great Britain	1–2	1–2	1964 Summer Olympics qualification
2	8 April 1964	Karaiskakis Stadium, Piraeus, Greece	Great Britain	2–1	4–1	1964 Summer Olympics qualification
3	8 April 1964	Karaiskakis Stadium, Piraeus, Greece	Great Britain	4–1	4–1	1964 Summer Olympics qualification
4	29 November 1964	Leoforos Alexandras Stadium, Athens, Greece	Denmark	3–2	4–2	1966 FIFA World Cup qualification
5	29 November 1964	Leoforos Alexandras Stadium, Athens, Greece	Denmark	4–2	4–2	1966 FIFA World Cup qualification
6	9 December 1964	Leoforos Alexandras Stadium, Athens, Greece	Wales	1–0	2–0	1966 FIFA World Cup qualification
7	17 March 1965	Ninian Park, Cardiff, Wales	Wales	1–0	1–4	1966 FIFA World Cup qualification
8	23 May 1965	Olympic Stadium, Athens, Greece	Soviet Union	1–1	3–1	1966 FIFA World Cup qualification
9	3 October 1965	Karaiskakis Stadium, Piraeus, Greece	Soviet Union	1–2	1–4	1966 FIFA World Cup qualification
10	4 October 1967	Karaiskakis Stadium, Piraeus, Greece	Austria	4–1	4–1	UEFA Euro 1968 qualifying
11	21 November 1968	AEK Stadium, Athens, Greece	Egypt	1–0	4–1	Friendly
12	11 December 1968	Karaiskakis Stadium, Piraeus, Greece	Portugal	1–1	4–2	1970 FIFA World Cup qualification
13	27 July 1969	Olympic Park Stadium, Melbourne, Australia	Australia	2–0	2–0	Friendly
14	28 October 1970	La Romareda, Zaragoza, Spain	Spain	2–1	2–1	Friendly
15	9 December 1970	Karaiskakis Stadium, Piraeus, Greece	Cyprus	1–1	1–1	Friendly
16	9 December 1970	Vasil Levski National Stadium, Sofia, Bulgaria	Bulgaria	2–2	2–2	Friendly
17	13 October 1974	Vasil Levski National Stadium, Sofia, Bulgaria	Bulgaria	3–2	3–3	UEFA Euro 1972 qualifying
18	15 November 1974	Karaiskakis Stadium, Piraeus, Greece	Cyprus	1–1	3–1	Friendly
19	4 June 1975	Toumba Stadium, Thessaloniki, Greece	Malta	4–0	4–0	Friendly
20	9 October 1976	Karaiskakis Stadium, Piraeus, Greece	Hungary	1–0	1–1	1978 FIFA World Cup qualification
21	10 May 1977	Kaftanzoglio Stadium, Thessaloniki, Greece	Soviet Union	1–0	1–0	1978 FIFA World Cup qualification

== Honours ==
=== Player ===
AEK Athens

- Alpha Ethniki: 1962–63, 1967–68, 1970–71, 1977–78, 1978–79
- Greek Cup: 1963–64, 1965–66, 1977–78

Western Suburbs

- Victorian Men's Metropolitan League Division 1: 1979

New York Pancyprian-Freedoms

- Cosmopolitan Soccer League: 1980
- National Challenge Cup: 1980

Greece military

- World Military Cup: 1962, 1963

Individual

- Alpha Ethniki top scorer: 1963–64, 1965–66
- Best Greek footballer of the 20th Century

=== Manager ===
New York Pancyprian-Freedoms

- Cosmopolitan Soccer League: 1982
- National Challenge Cup: 1982, 1983
