= 1975–76 Alpha Ethniki =

40th season of top-tier football league in Greece

Alpha Ethniki
- Season: 1975–76
- Champions: PAOK; 1st Greek title
- Relegated: None
- European Cup: PAOK
- UEFA Cup: AEK Athens; Olympiacos
- Cup Winners' Cup: Iraklis
- Matches: 240
- Goals: 553 (2.3 per match)
- Top goalscorer: Georgios Dedes (15 goals)

The 1975–76 Alpha Ethniki was the 40th season of the highest football league of Greece. The season began on 5 October 1975 and ended on 23 May 1976. PAOK won their first Greek title in history.

The point system was: Win: 2 points - Draw: 1 point.

== Teams ==
Promoted from 1974–75 Beta Ethniki	Relegated from 1974–75 Alpha Ethniki
Panetolikos; Apollon Athens; Pierikos	Olympiacos Volos; Egaleo; Kavala; Kalamata; AEL

Location of teams in 1975–76 Alpha Ethniki

== League table ==
Pos	Team	Pld	W	D	L	GF	GA	GD	Pts	Qualification
1	PAOK (C)	30	21	7	2	60	17	+43	49	Qualification for European Cup first round
2	AEK Athens	30	18	8	4	57	18	+39	44	Qualification for UEFA Cup first round
3	Olympiacos	30	16	9	5	48	28	+20	41	Qualification for UEFA Cup first round
4	Panathinaikos	30	14	10	6	47	28	+19	38	
5	PAS Giannina	30	15	6	9	40	33	+7	36	
6	Aris	30	13	9	8	50	27	+23	35	
7	Ethnikos Piraeus	30	12	8	10	43	39	+4	32	
8	Iraklis	30	9	9	12	33	39	−6	27	Qualification for Cup Winners' Cup first round
9	Atromitos (Note: Atromitos were deducted 3 points.)	30	9	11	10	27	33	−6	26	
10	Panachaiki	30	7	11	12	22	35	−13	25	
11	Pierikos	30	5	13	12	26	38	−12	23	
12	Panionios	30	5	12	13	15	36	−21	22	
13	Kastoria	30	4	14	12	21	45	−24	22	
14	Apollon Athens	30	6	9	15	26	49	−23	21	
15	Panetolikos	30	3	13	14	17	41	−24	19	
16	Panserraikos	30	5	7	18	21	47	−26	17	

Source: RSSSF
Rules for classification: 1st points; 2nd decision match; 3rd head-to-head goal difference.
(C) Champions

== Results ==
Home \ Away	AEK	APA	ARIS	ATR	ETH	IRA	KAS	OLY	PNC	PAO	PNT	PAN	PNS	PAOK	PAS	PIE
AEK Athens		3–1	2–1	5–1	1–0	1–0	4–0	1–1	5–1	0–1	4–0	2–0	4–0	0–0	1–0	5–0
Apollon Athens	2–2		0–1	0–0	1–1	1–0	2–0	1–2	1–1	1–0	0–0	2–1	4–1	0–1	1–1	3–0
Aris	1–0	6–0		2–0	1–1	1–0	5–1	0–0	3–0	1–1	6–1	1–0	1–0	0–0	4–0	2–0
Atromitos	0–0	1–1	2–1		1–1	2–0	1–0	0–1	0–0	1–3	0–0	0–0	1–0	0–1	3–0	1–0
Ethnikos Piraeus	3–4	3–0	2–1	0–2		2–0	2–0	2–2	2–1	2–0	2–0	4–1	3–0	0–4	0–0	2–0
Iraklis	0–1	2–0	2–2	1–1	6–1		2–1	0–0	0–0	1–3	1–0	2–1	1–0	1–3	1–0	3–2
Kastoria	0–0	1–1	1–0	1–0	1–1	1–1		1–1	1–0	0–0	2–2	1–1	4–1	2–2	1–1	1–1
Olympiacos	0–2	6–0	2–1	2–1	0–2	2–0	2–0		1–0	4–2	4–1	3–0	3–1	0–4	5–1	1–0
Panachaiki	0–3	4–2	1–1	2–0	2–0	1–2	2–0	1–1		0–0	0–0	0–0	1–0	0–3	2–0	1–1
Panathinaikos	2–2	2–1	2–0	2–0	3–0	1–1	3–0	0–0	2–1		1–1	1–0	3–1	1–1	6–1	1–1
Panetolikos	1–3	1–0	2–2	0–0	1–1	3–1	0–0	0–1	0–0	2–3		0–1	1–0	0–2	0–1	0–0
Panionios	0–2	1–0	1–0	1–1	1–1	1–1	0–0	0–0	0–0	0–2	1–0		2–0	0–4	0–0	0–0
Panserraikos	0–0	1–1	1–1	2–3	1–4	2–1	3–0	0–0	0–1	1–0	0–0	3–1		0–1	0–0	2–0
PAOK	1–0	3–0	2–2	1–2	1–0	2–2	3–0	3–1	2–0	3–1	4–1	4–0	1–0		1–0	1–1
PAS Giannina	2–0	2–0	2–0	3–0	3–1	0–0	3–0	3–0	3–0	2–1	1–0	2–1	5–1	2–0		2–1
Pierikos	0–0	2–0	1–3	3–3	1–0	4–1	1–1	1–3	2–0	0–0	0–0	0–0	0–0	1–2	3–0	

Source: RSSSF
Legend: Blue = home team win; Yellow = draw; Red = away team win.

== Top scorers ==
Rank	Player	Club	Goals
1	(Greece) Georgios Dedes	AEK Athens	15
2	(Greece) Giorgos Koudas	PAOK	14
3	(Greece) Dinos Ballis	Aris	13
3	(Greece) Totis Filakouris	Ethnikos Piraeus	13
5	(Greece) Kostas Eleftherakis	Panathinaikos	12
6	(Greece) Stavros Sarafis	PAOK	11
6	(Brazil) Neto Guerino	PAOK	11
6	(Greece) Mimis Papaioannou	AEK Athens	11
6	(West Germany) Walter Wagner	AEK Athens	11
6	(Greece) Lakis Papaioannou	Pierikos	11

== Attendances ==
Olympiacos drew the highest average home attendance in the 1975–76 Alpha Ethniki.

#	Team	Average attendance
1	Olympiacos	22,089
2	PAOK	19,330
3	Panathinaikos	18,196
4	AEK Athens	16,296
5	Ethnikos Piraeus	11,417
6	Iraklis	10,998
7	Aris	10,635
8	Apollon Athens	6,725
9	Panionios	6,710
10	Atromitos	6,551
11	Panachaiki	6,321
12	PAS Giannina	6,016
13	Panetolikos	4,994
14	Pierikos	4,127
15	Kastoria	2,981
16	Panserraikos	2,332
