= Giorgos Skrekis =

Greek footballer (born 1945)

Personal information
- Full name: Georgios Skrekis
- Date of birth: 2 February 1945 (age 81)
- Place of birth: Kallithea, Athens, Greece
- Height: 1.86 m (6 ft 1 in)
- Positions: Defender; defensive midfielder

Youth career
- –1962: Iraklis Kallithea
- 1962–1963: Panionios

Senior career*
Years	Team	Apps	(Gls)
1963–1974	Panionios	290	(1)
1974–1977	AEK Athens	40	(1)
1977–1978	Panionios	14	(0)
Total		344	(2)

International career
1966–1970	Greece	5	(0)
1968–1969	Greece military	5	(0)
- * Club domestic league appearances and goals

Giorgos Skrekis (Greek: Γιώργος Σκρέκης; born 2 February 1945) is a Greek former professional footballer who played as a defender. His nickname was "Kalpos" (Greek: "Κάλπος"), due his running style on the pitch that resembled a horse while galloping.

== Club career ==
Skrekis was systematically involved in football from a young age as a member of the youth teams of Iraklis Kallithea. In 1962, at the age of 17, he was transferred to Panionios and the following year, the manager, Giannis Skordilis, established him in the senior team, as a centre-back, a position that he competed for almost five seasons. He was a key player for the team when they reached the final of the Greek Cup in 1967, losing to Panathinaikos. In 1968, the manager, Dezső Bundzsák, recognizing his speed and his acceleration, relocated him as a right-back. His career at the club of Nea Smyrni culminated in 1971, when they finished the second in the league, behind AEK Athens, while they won the Balkans Cup. A serious injury at the beginning of the following season left him out of the squad for a long period.

On 8 August 1974, Skrekis was transferred to AEK Athens of Loukas Barlos and František Fadrhonc, alongside his teammates, Georgios Dedes and Victoras Theofilopoulos, while Panionios received the amount of 2 million drachmas plus Kostas Panagiotopoulos, Babis Psimogiannos and Ivan Kypritidis as exchange. Even though Fadrhonc believed in his abilities, his relatively advanced footballing age and the remains of his serious injury did not allow him to impress with the yellow-black jersey. He scored his only goal on 21 December 1975 in a 2–1 home win over Aris. He was a part of the squad that reached to the semi-finals of the UEFA Cup in 1977. On 1 August 1977, he returned to Panionios where he spent a season, before ending his career. At the end of the season he was awarded the Golden Cross of Panionios, for his overall contribution to the club.

== International career ==
Skrekis was five times international with Greece between 1966 and 1970. He made his debut on 16 October 1966 in a 2–1 home win for the Euro qualifiers against Finland. He played again on 11 October 1970 in an away match against Malta for the Euro qualifiers, which ended 1–1. This was followed by two friendly defeats against Spain away from home and Australia at home. His last appearance was on 16 December 1970 in a home match for the Euro qualifiers against Switzerland, which were defeated by 1–0.

Skrekis also played 5 times for the Greece Military Team with which he won the World Military Cup for two consecutive years in 1968 and 1969.

== After football ==
After finishing his football career, Skrekis was successful in the travel business and is the owner of the GS TRAVEL S.A. travel agency, organizing through it many fan trips for matches of Greek clubs abroad. His friendship with Dimitrios Melissanidis, made him accept in joining him in the summer of 2013 in his Steering Committee of AEK, even though his tenure was brief.

== Personal life ==
Skrekis is married and has two daughters.

== Honours ==
Panionios

- Balkans Cup: 1971

Greece Military

- World Military Cup: 1968, 1969

Individual

- Panionios Golden Cross: 1978
