= Victoras Theofilopoulos =

Greek footballer (born 1951)

Personal information
- Full name: Victoras Theofilopoulos
- Date of birth: 1951 (age 74–75)
- Place of birth: Nea Smyrni, Athens, Greece
- Position: Left-back

Youth career
- –1967: Panionios

Senior career*
Years	Team	Apps	(Gls)
1967–1974	Panionios	92	(0)
1974–1975	AEK Athens	0	(0)
1975–1976	→ Kastoria (loan)	1	(0)
1976–1977	Apollon Athens	6	(0)
Total		99	(0)

International career
1970	Greece U19	1	(0)
1972	Greece Military		
- * Club domestic league appearances and goals

Victoras Theofilopoulos (Greek: Βίκτωρας Θεοφιλόπουλος; born 1951) is a Greek former professional footballer who played as a left-back.

== Club career ==
Theofilopoulos began his football career when he joined the youth team of Panionios at the age of 16 and he was almost immediately promoted to the men's team. He became a key member of the team in an era which was described as one of the best in the club's history, since in 1969 they made a record to have five players of their roster representing Greece simultaneously. Additionally, he was in the squad of Panionios that won the Balkans Cup and finished in the second place of the Championship in 1971. The following season they competed in the UEFA Cup, where they eliminated Atlético Madrid on away goals in the first round. However, in the second round they played against Ferencváros and after the end of a heavy 6–0 defeat in the first leg, incidents occurred by their supporters, which led in their ejection from the competition.

In the summer of 1974, the new owner of AEK Athens, Loukas Barlos alongside the newly-appointed manager of the club, František Fadrhonc were planning to form a full roster, with two equal line-ups. In the search for a both reliable and offensive left-back, they ended up in Theofilopoulos. Thus, on 8 August he, alongside his teammates, Giorgos Skrekis and Georgios Dedes were transferred to the yellow-blacks. Panionios received the amount of 2 million drachmas and Kostas Panagiotopoulos, Babis Psimogiannos and Ivan Kypritidis as exchange. At AEK, he failed to impress and did not manage to establish himself in the squad. In the following summer was loaned to Kastoria for a season. In August 1976 he joined Apollon Athens, where he ended his professional career in 1977.

== International career ==
In 1970 Theofilopoulos played with Greece U19 against Turkey U19 at Ankara for a qualifying match for the UEFA European Under-19 Championship.

In 1972 he played with the Military team in the qualifying matches for the World Military Cup of that year, but did not play in the final phase.

== After football ==
After finishing his football career, Theofilopoulos became actively involved again with his Panionios, serving as a curator and offering his services from various positions. In January 2011 he was honored by the Veterans Association of AEK Athens.

== Honours ==
Panionios

- Balkans Cup: 1971
