= Theofilopoulos =

Theofilopoulos is a surname. Notable people with the surname include:

- Aliki Theofilopoulos
- Victoras Theofilopoulos
