= 1974–75 Alpha Ethniki =

39th season of top-tier football league in Greece

Alpha Ethniki
- Season: 1974–75
- Champions: Olympiacos; 20th Greek title
- Relegated: Olympiacos Volos; Egaleo; Kavala; Kalamata; AEL
- European Cup: Olympiacos
- UEFA Cup: AEK Athens; PAOK
- Cup Winners' Cup: Panathinaikos
- Matches: 306
- Goals: 766 (2.5 per match)
- Top goalscorer: Antonis Antoniadis; Washington Calcaterra (20 goals each)

The 1974–75 Alpha Ethniki was the 39th season of the highest football league of Greece. The season began on 29 September 1974 and ended on 8 June 1975. Olympiacos won their third consecutive and 20th Greek title.

The point system was: Win: 2 points - Draw: 1 point.

== Teams ==
Promoted from 1973–74 Beta Ethniki	Relegated from 1973–74 Alpha Ethniki
PAS Giannina; Kalamata; Atromitos; Kastoria	APOEL (Note: Withdrawn from the Alpha Ethniki due to the Turkish invasion of Cyprus and moved to Cypriot First Division.); Fostiras; Apollon Athens; Apollon Kalamarias

Location of teams in 1974–75 Alpha Ethniki

== League table ==
Pos	Team	Pld	W	D	L	GF	GA	GD	Pts	Qualification or relegation
1	Olympiacos (C)	34	24	9	1	65	21	+44	57	Qualification for European Cup first round
2	AEK Athens	34	23	9	2	73	20	+53	55	Qualification for UEFA Cup first round
3	PAOK	34	19	8	7	73	28	+45	46	Qualification for UEFA Cup first round
4	Ethnikos Piraeus	34	17	11	6	48	28	+20	45	
5	Panathinaikos	34	14	12	8	62	41	+21	40	Qualification for Cup Winners' Cup first round (Note: Since Olympiacos, winners of 1974–75 Greek Football Cup, was qualified for the 1975–76 European Cup, losing cup finalists Panathinaikos earned a spot in the first round of the 1975–76 European Cup Winners' Cup.)
6	Aris	34	15	9	10	47	38	+9	39	
7	Panachaiki	34	11	11	12	41	39	+2	33	
8	Iraklis	34	11	10	13	40	40	0	32	
9	PAS Giannina	34	13	6	15	38	43	−5	32	
10	Panionios	34	10	10	14	37	45	−8	30	
11	Kastoria	34	10	10	14	40	64	−24	30	
12	Panserraikos	34	7	15	12	23	36	−13	29	
13	Atromitos	34	8	12	14	24	46	−22	28	
14	Olympiacos Volos (R)	34	12	3	19	36	56	−20	27	Relegation to Beta Ethniki
15	Egaleo (R)	34	11	3	20	34	53	−19	25	Relegation to Beta Ethniki
16	Kavala (R)	34	10	4	20	38	49	−11	24	Relegation to Beta Ethniki
17	Kalamata (R)	34	8	7	19	23	60	−37	23	Relegation to Beta Ethniki
18	AEL (R)	34	5	7	22	24	59	−35	17	Relegation to Beta Ethniki

Source: RSSSF
Rules for classification: 1st points; 2nd decision match; 3rd head-to-head goal difference.
(C) Champions; (R) Relegated

== Results ==
Home \ Away	AEK	AEL	ARIS	ATR	EGA	ETH	IRA	KAL	KAS	KAV	OLY	OLV	PNC	PAO	PAN	PNS	PAOK	PAS
AEK Athens		5–1	2–0	4–0	3–1	3–0	3–0	3–1	4–0	3–2	0–0	3–0	3–1	4–3	3–0	5–0	3–1	3–0
AEL	0–2		0–1	0–0	1–0	1–2	0–2	3–0	4–1	2–0	0–0	2–1	1–2	1–5	0–1	1–1	0–2	0–2
Aris	1–1	2–0		3–1	3–1	0–0	1–2	2–0	4–0	2–1	0–0	1–0	1–0	5–3	3–0	2–0	2–1	2–1
Atromitos	2–2	0–0	0–0		1–1	2–1	0–0	0–0	1–1	2–1	0–1	1–2	2–1	0–0	3–1	1–0	0–1	2–0
Egaleo	1–4	4–1	1–0	1–2		0–1	1–2	2–0	1–0	1–0	0–2	3–0	2–0	2–1	1–0	1–0	1–1	1–0
Ethnikos Piraeus	1–0	3–0	1–1	3–0	2–0		0–0	3–1	3–2	3–0	1–2	2–0	2–1	2–1	3–1	0–0	1–0	2–1
Iraklis	0–2	3–1	0–0	2–0	1–0	0–0		5–0	1–1	0–1	2–3	4–0	3–1	1–1	0–0	1–1	1–4	3–1
Kalamata	0–1	3–1	0–3	1–0	1–0	0–3	2–1		2–1	1–0	0–3	2–1	1–1	2–0	2–2	0–0	0–0	2–2
Kastoria	0–2	3–2	4–2	0–0	3–1	0–0	0–0	2–0		2–1	1–1	1–0	1–1	3–3	2–0	1–1	1–0	1–0
Kavala	0–0	1–0	1–1	1–0	4–1	2–1	1–2	3–0	6–1		1–2	2–1	1–0	0–1	1–2	4–1	0–1	0–0
Olympiacos	3–0	1–0	1–0	1–1	6–1	1–1	3–1	4–0	5–1	1–0		4–1	2–1	2–1	1–0	3–0	3–2	3–1
Olympiacos Volos	0–1	2–0	3–1	0–0	2–1	2–2	1–0	2–1	2–1	3–1	0–1		1–0	1–3	2–1	1–0	0–0	4–0
Panachaiki	0–0	4–1	3–0	2–0	3–1	2–2	1–1	3–0	0–0	2–1	1–1	3–1		0–0	0–0	2–1	2–0	2–1
Panathinaikos	0–0	1–0	2–1	4–0	2–1	0–0	2–0	4–1	3–2	0–0	1–1	5–1	4–1		4–0	1–1	1–1	3–1
Panionios	0–2	1–1	1–1	1–2	1–1	2–0	2–0	2–0	5–1	4–0	0–1	2–0	0–0	2–2		1–0	2–2	2–1
Panserraikos	1–1	0–0	1–1	4–0	1–0	0–3	1–0	0–0	1–0	2–0	1–1	2–1	0–0	1–1	2–0		0–0	0–0
PAOK	1–1	4–0	5–0	5–1	3–1	3–0	3–0	2–0	7–1	6–2	2–0	3–0	3–1	2–0	1–1	2–0		4–1
PAS Giannina	0–0	0–0	2–1	2–0	2–0	0–0	3–2	1–0	1–2	1–0	0–2	3–1	2–0	2–0	3–0	2–0	2–1	

Source: RSSSF
Legend: Blue = home team win; Yellow = draw; Red = away team win.

== Top scorers ==
Rank	Player	Club	Goals
1	(Greece) Antonis Antoniadis	Panathinaikos	20
1	(Uruguay) Washington Calcaterra	Ethnikos Piraeus	20
3	(Greece) Michalis Kritikopoulos	Olympiacos	19
4	(West Germany) Walter Wagner	AEK Athens	17
5	(Greece) Stavros Sarafis	PAOK	15
6	(Greece) Georgios Dedes	AEK Athens	14
6	(Greece) Michalis Chastalis	Egaleo	14
8	(Greece) Achilleas Aslanidis	PAOK	13
8	(Greece) Anestis Afentoulidis	Kastoria	13
10	(Argentina) Óscar Álvarez	PAS Giannina	12
10	(Greece) Kostas Davourlis	Olympiacos	12
10	(Greece) Giorgos Spyropoulos	Panachaiki	12

== Attendances ==
Olympiacos drew the highest average home attendance in the 1974–75 Alpha Ethniki.

#	Team	Average attendance
1	Olympiacos	24,959
2	AEK Athens	18,798
3	PAOK	17,447
4	Panathinaikos	16,713
5	Ethnikos Piraeus	14,189
6	Iraklis	10,421
7	Aris	8,514
8	PAS Giannina	6,463
9	Panionios	6,306
10	Atromitos	6,146
11	AEL	6,073
12	Panachaiki	5,496
13	Egaleo	4,903
14	Kastoria	3,947
15	Kavala	3,777
16	Olympiacos Volos	3,729
17	Panserraikos	3,634
18	Kalamata	2,908
