= Babis Psimogiannos =

Greek footballer (born 1947)

Personal information
- Full name: Charalampos Psimogiannos
- Date of birth: 13 August 1947 (age 79)
- Place of birth: Agios Konstantinos, Phthiotis, Greece
- Height: 1.83 m (6 ft 0 in)
- Position: Striker

Senior career*
Years	Team	Apps	(Gls)
1967–1971	Aris Agios Konstantinos		
1971–1974	AEK Athens	52	(8)
1974–1976	Panionios	41	(9)
1976–1979	Apollon Athens	47	(11)
1979–1984	Aris Agios Konstantinos		
Total		140	(28)
- * Club domestic league appearances and goals

Babis Psimogiannos (Greek: Μπάμπης Ψιμόγιαννος; born 13 August 1947) is a Greek former professional footballer who played as striker.

== Club career ==
Psimogiannos started his football career at the club of his village, Aris Agios Konstantinos, where his brother Antonis played as well. With Psimogiannos as a key player in the offensive line of the team, Aris Agios Konstantinos won their promotion to the second division in 1970 after three play-off matches against Paniliakos. The achievement was surprising by the standards of the time, as it was unprecedented for the team of a large village of 2,000 inhabitants to compete in a national division. Psimogiannos competed with Aris Agios Konstantinos in the second division where at the end of the season they were relegated, unable to withstand the intense competition. In the meanwhile Psimogiannos had attracted the interest of the big clubs with his performances. On 28 August 1971 he was transferred to AEK Athens, the team he supported as a child. He initially signed as an amateur footballer, but he didn't take him long to convince the manager, Branko Stanković to get him in signing a professional contract.

During his spell at the club the supporters of AEK from Agios Konstantinos organized trips to Nea Filadelfeia to see their fellow countryman playing. Psimogiannos became the cause of the establishment of AEK Agios Konstantinos, a club founded by refugees of AEK at the area in the early 80's. He was a dynamic centrer-forward standing out for his physicality, Psimogiannos found a place in the club's squad, being in many matches the strong and solid player of the offense, that broke the opposing defenses. He managed to play with AEK in the UEFA competitions making four appearances. He played the full match in the 3–2 home win over Internazionale on 29 September 1971 for the European Cup and as a substitute in both legs against Salgótarján in September 1972. He also played in the 1–3 home defeat by Liverpool on 7 November 1972 for the UEFA Cup.

In the summer of 1974, the president of the club, Loukas Barlos negotiating the acquisition of Georgios Dedes, alongside Giorgos Skrekis and Victoras Theofilopoulos from Panionios was asked for Psimogiannos among the exchanges. Psimogiannos accepted the move and on 8 August the transfer move was completed, with him moving to Panionios alongside Kostas Panagiotopoulos and Ivan Kypritidis. In fact he made a surprising statement during a television interview with journalist Kostas Kyriazis, as the new signing of Panionios stated that he accepted only because it was dictated by the interest of AEK. He played for Panionios for two seasons, before the arrival of Nikos Anastopoulos from Dafni in the summer of 1976. This led Psimogiannos in being released from the club on 30 July 1976 and sign for Apollon Athens in the following day. There, he played for three seasons. In the summer of 1979, he returned to Aris Agios Konstantinos, where he played until the end of his football career in 1984.

== Honours ==
Aris Agios Konstantinos

- Phthiotis AFC League: 1968, 1969, 1970
