= Timo Zahnleiter =

German footballer (born 1948)

Personal information
- Full name: Hans-Dieter Zahnleiter
- Date of birth: 16 December 1948 (age 77)
- Place of birth: Mannheim, Germany
- Positions: Midfielder; left-back

Senior career*
| Years | Team | Apps | (Gls) |
| 1967–1971 | VfR Mannheim | | |
| 1971–1974 | 1860 Munich | | |
| 1974–1977 | AEK Athens | 30 | (7) |
| 1977–1979 | VfR Bürstadt | | |
| 1979–1981 | Wormatia Worms | 63 | (4) |

Managerial career
- 1983–1984: Darmstadt 98 (assistant)
- 1984: 1. FC Köln (assistant)
- 1986–1987: Eintracht Frankfurt (assistant)
- 1987–1989: Eintracht Frankfurt
- 1989–1990: Viktoria Aschaffenburg
- 1990: Energie Cottbus
- 1991–1992: VfB Marburg
- 1993–1994: Rot-Weiß Walldorf
- 1995–1996: PAS Giannina
- 1996–1997: Ethnikos Piraeus
- 1998–1999: Ethnikos Asteras
- 1999–2001: Anagennisi Karditsa
- 2005–2008: SV Seckenheim
- * Club domestic league appearances and goals

Hans-Dieter "Timo" Zahnleiter (born 16 December 1948) is a German former professional football player and manager who played as a midfielder.

== Club career ==
Zahnleiter started his professional career in 1967 playing for VfR Mannheim until 1971. Afterwards, he spent the next three years in 1860 Munich, who compteted at 2. Bundesliga at the time. From 1973 his playing time was signifianctly reduced, since he was suffering from injuries.

In July 1974, he moved to Greece and signed for AEK Athens for a fee of 150,000 Deutsche Marks (1.2 million drachmas), alongside his fellow countryman, Walter Wagner. Zahnleiter played in the midfield and was distinguished mainly for his blocking skills, however, from the second year he was placed on the left side of the defense by František Fadrhonc, since the latter believed that this way AEK would achieve more beauty in their game. At AEK he suffered from injuries again and eventually in February 1977 he was released and returned to Germany to undergo surgery.

Afterwards, he played in VfR Bürstadt for one year and in Wormatia Worms for two years, where he also completed his football career.

== Managerial career ==
Zahnleiter began his coaching career in 1983, as an assistant in Darmstadt 98 in the 2. Liga, while in 1984 he joined the coaching staff of 1. FC Köln again as an assistant. Then he had a spell at Eintracht Frankfurt until 1989 and other German teams such as Viktoria Aschaffenburg, Energie Cottbus, VfB Marburg and Rot-Weiß Walldorf until 1994 and in 1995 he returned to Greece on behalf of PAS Giannina. Subsequently, and in successive order, he assumed the technical leadership of Ethnikos Piraeus, Ethnikos Asteras and Anagennisi Karditsa, but without any remarkable success. In January 1999, he was removed from Anagennisi Karditsa due to poor results and then returned to Germany, being the coach of SV Seckenheim at the Landesliga from 2005 to 2008 period.
