= Manolis Pappas =

Greek footballer

Personal information
- Full name: Emmanouil Pappas
- Date of birth: 1951 (age 74–75)
- Place of birth: Piraeus, Greece
- Height: 1.70 m (5 ft 7 in)
- Position: Midfielder

Youth career
- –1969: Ethnikos Piraeus

Senior career*
Years	Team	Apps	(Gls)
1969–1976	Panachaiki	189	(11)
1976–1979	Ethnikos Piraeus	67	(6)
Total		256	(17)
- * Club domestic league appearances and goals

Manolis Pappas (Greek: Εμμανουήλ Παππάς; born 1951) is a former Greek footballer who played as a midfielder.

== Club career ==
Pappas started his career at Ethnikos Piraeus before signing to Panachaiki in the summer of 1969. He was a member of the squad that qualified for the UEFA Cup in 1973. In the following season he played in all of the matches of the UEFA Cup where Panachaiki eliminated GAK in the first round and were eliminated by Twente in the second round. He played at the club of Patras until 1976. Afterwards, he returned to Ethnikos Piraeus, where he finished his career in 1979.
