= Christos Ardizoglou =

Greek footballer (born 1953)

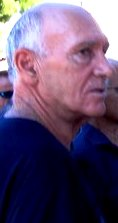

Personal information
- Date of birth: 25 March 1953 (age 73)
- Place of birth: Jerusalem, Israel
- Height: 1.80 m (5 ft 11 in)
- Positions: Midfielder; winger; full-back

Youth career
- 1966–1971: Apollon Athens

Senior career*
Years	Team	Apps	(Gls)
1971–1974	Apollon Athens	79	(18)
1974–1985	AEK Athens	261	(50)
1985–1986	Apollon Athens	6	(0)
1986–1987	Atromitos	27	(2)
1987	Olympiacos Chalkida		
1987–1988	Ermis Ermioni (player-manger)		
Total		373	(70)

International career
1973–1974	Greece U19		(3)
1974–1975	Greece U21		
1975–1984	Greece	43	(2)
1975–1979	Greece military	7	(3)
- * Club domestic league appearances and goals

Christos Ardizoglou (Greek: Χρήστος Αρδίζογλου; born 25 March 1953) is a Greek former international footballer who played as mainly a midfielder.

== Early life ==
Ardizoglou was born in Jerusalem, where his family had found refuge after the Asia Minor disaster, from a Greek father and an Israeli mother. After living the first years of his life in Israel, his parents, Dimitris and Angeliki decided in 1958 to settle the family in Greece. Thus the 5-year-old Ardizoglou alongside his parents and five siblings moved in the slums of Nea Ionia, in a harsh poverty which consisted the everyday life in the most common way of the time. Trying to mentally escape of that way of life, he started occasionally playing football and doing cycling training at the Amarousion Sports Club where he obtained his sports card. The hard opposition and punishment from his parents due to his enactment with sports, did not prevent him from following his dream. Soon enough, the neighborhood scouts were impressed by the skills of the young Ardizoglou and despite being rejected by the neighboring AEK Athens, which he desired to join, he eventually signed for another neighboring club of Apollon Athens.

== Club career ==
=== Apollon Athens ===
In 1966 Ardizoglou became a member of the infrastructure departments of Apollon Athens. Despite his great performances with the reserve team of Apollon the manager of the men's team, Dezső Bundzsák refused to promote him. As a result he quit football and began working in a factory for six months, until he was urged to return to the club.

In 1971 Ardizoglou was eventually promoted to the men's team and signed a professional contract, playing as a full-back. At the end of the season Apollon were relegated to the second division. Ardizoglou, who in the meantime has been converted to the position of wide midfielder, was amongst the players who had major contribution in the club's return to the first division. From that moment on he became one of their star players. In July 1974, the management of Apollon, obeying the will of the leaders of the then regime, were about to give Ardizoglou to Panathinaikos. His move to the "greens" was thwarted at the last minute due to the fall of the dictatorial regime. Afterwards he was very close in signing to Olympiacos, coming to their training ground. Nevertheless on 7 August with his quick actions and in a surprising move the new president of AEK Athens, Loukas Barlos got him to sign for his club. The transfer cost the exorbitant sum for the time of 12 million drachmas and four players as an exchange, while Ardizoglou got an apartment as a transfer gift.

=== AEK Athens ===
Ardizoglou quickly established in the squad of AEK and under František Fadrhonc he became an important tool of the team that stared for years both domestically and internationally. On 27 February 1977 in a home match against Pierikos for the league after a penalty wasn't awarded to AEK, he alongside his teammates gathered around the referee to protest. After intense protests and the refere's refusal to award the penalty Ardizoglou escaped from the hands of his teammates and attacked the referee. This resulted in his expulsion with a straight red and his punishment with 10 matches. His greatest moment was reaching the semi-finals of UEFA Cup in 1977 even though he wasn't eligible to compete, due to the punishment with Greece U19. The following season, he scored in the heavy 4–1 away defeat by Standard Liège for the UEFA Cup on 1 November 1977. At the end of that season AEK won the domestic double. He also contributed in the great 6–1 win over Porto on 13 November 1978 for European Cup, where he scored the second goal for his team. On 14 May 1981, Ardizoglou was called to play for the Europe XI in a match against Fenerbahçe in early June for the 75th anniversary of the Turkish club, but eventually he did not feature in the match. He played for AEK for 11 consecutive years, winning two championships and two Greek Cups including a double. In 1985 Ardizoglou came into conflict with the major shareholder of the club, Andreas Zafiropoulos and in the summer of the same year he and with the urge of the then manager Antonis Georgiadis, he terminated his contract with the yellow-blacks.

=== Later years ===
On 15 July 1985 Ardizoglou returned to Apollon Athens, but this time he did not manage to establish himself. In January 1986 he moved to the second division side, Atromitos, where he played for one year and then moved to Olympiacos Chalkida. There he retired as a footballer and later started coaching at the level of amateur football clubs and academies.

== International career ==
Ardizoglou was a member of Greece U19 from 1973 to 1974. He played in the qualifying round of the 1973 UEFA European Under-18 Championship, where they finised second behind Romania. The following year he was part of the squad the qualified in the 1974 UEFA European Under-18 Championship and reached its semi-finals, where the lost to Yugoslavia. A few days later, a group of Greek internationals met the referee of the match by accident which they attacked. Amongst his attackers, the referee identified Ardizoglou and Voulgaris of Olympiacos Volos and filed a report, which resulted in his punishment with a two-year ban from the club and international competitions of UEFA.

On 24 September 1975 Ardizoglou made his debut for Greece against Romania for the Balkan Cup. He was member of the squad that participated in UEFA Euro 1980, which consisted Greece's debut in a major tournament. He played 43 times in total scoring 2 goals.

== Managerial career ==
Ardizoglou was also the manager of Apollon Athens from 1 July 1998 to 3 September 1999.

== After football ==
Ardizoglou is now retired from the Greek Police, in which he joined in the context of the search for a stable job in the State, as was customary for athletes of his time. He continuously participates in the events of the Veterans' Association of AEK Athens. In the 2019 local elections, he was a candidate for municipal councilor of Athens with the "Open City" party.

== Style of play ==
The distinctive athletic skills of Ardizoglou complemented his unconventional and idiosyncratic character and contributed to a distinctive presence on the pitch, both positively and negatively. His appearance with his tall and slender physique, playing with his socks pulled down to his ankles and his shirt outside his shorts, made him easily recognizable on the pitch. His appearance was complemented by his distinctive movements and playing style. He primarily played on the wings, with a preference for the left side, in a role that allowed him to start from deeper positions, allowing him to exploit space to sprint and penetrate the opposing defenses, while he was also capable of playing as a full-back. He was an accurate passer, with good free kicks, power shots, but was particularly noted for his pace. His pace enabled him to advance towards the opposition area with minimal resistance. He was technically skilled, although he relied less on close dribbling, as he preferred to exploit open space by pushing the ball forward and accelerating, overtaking his marker. Despite his evident talent, at the same time was he was also capable of highly inconsistent performances. When he had the ball he could be unpredictable in his decision-making, capable of dribbling past multiple opponents to score, while at other times losing possession or carrying the ball out of play.

== Honours ==
AEK Athens

- Alpha Ethniki: 1977–78, 1978–79
- Greek Cup: 1977–78, 1982–83

Individual

- Greek Cup top scorer: 1975–76
