= Washington Calcaterra =

Uruguayan footballer (born 1950)

Personal information
- Full name: Washington Roberto Calcaterra
- Date of birth: 12 May 1950 (age 76)
- Place of birth: Dolores, Uruguay
- Position: Forward

Youth career
- Libertad F.C.(URU)

Senior career*
Years	Team	Apps	(Gls)
1964–1969	Libertad F.C.(URU)		
1970–1974	Nacional		
1974	Cerro (loan)		
1974–1978	Ethnikos Piraeus	37	(20)
1979–1980	Ethnikos Piraeus	7	(0)
- * Club domestic league appearances and goals

Washington Roberto Calcaterra, Chueco, (born 12 May 1950) is a Uruguayan retired footballer who played as a forward for club sides in Uruguay and Greece.

== Club career ==
Born in Montevideo, Calcaterra began playing football with Cañada Nieto side Libertad Fútbol Club. He started playing with the club's senior side at age 14, but would move to Club Nacional de Football in 1970. Calcaterra was a member of Nacional's world champion side in 1971 and stayed with the club until 1974, when he went on a six-month loan to C.A. Cerro.

Calcaterra moved to Greece in July 1974, joining Greek first division side Ethnikos Piraeus F.C. He would become the joint top goal-scorer during his first season, notching 20 goals. He suffered a serious injury early in his second season with Ethnikos Piraeus, playing sparingly over the next three seasons.

After one season away from Ethnikos Piraeus, he returned for the 1979–80 season, playing in seven matches before retiring.
