= 1971 Balkans Cup =

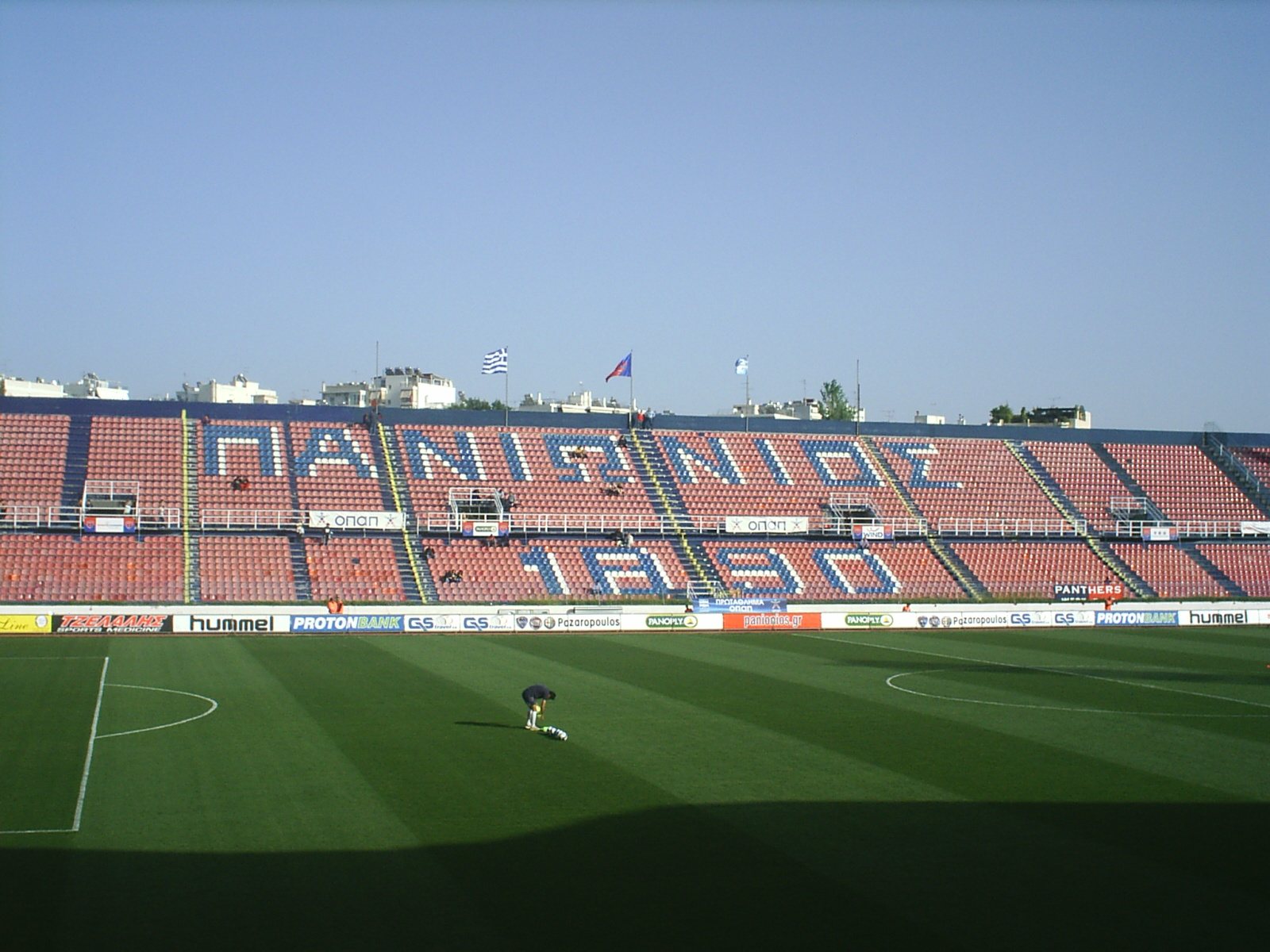
- Nea Smyrni stadium, home of Panionios FC.

Tournament details
- Country: Balkans
- Teams: 6

Final positions
- Champions: (Greece) Panionios
- Runners-up: (Albania) Besa Kavajë

Tournament statistics
- Matches played: 14
- Goals scored: 34 (2.43 per match)

The 1971 Balkans Cup was an edition of the Balkans Cup, a football competition for representative clubs from the Balkan states. It was contested by 6 teams and Panionios won the trophy.

== Group Stage ==
=== Group A ===
Pos	Team	Pld	W	D	L	GF	GA	GR	Pts	Qualification
1	(Albania) Besa Kavajë (A)	4	2	1	1	5	5	1.000	5	Advances to finals
2	(Socialist Federal Republic of Yugoslavia) FK Crvenka	4	1	2	1	7	6	1.167	4	
3	(Bulgaria) Etar Veliko Tarnovo	4	1	1	2	6	7	0.857	3	

Source: rsssf.com
Rules for classification: 1) points; 2) goal average; 3) number of goals scored
(A) Advance to a further round
14 April 1971

Etar Veliko Tarnovo (Bulgaria)	1–1	(Socialist Federal Republic of Yugoslavia) FK Crvenka

Ivaylo, Veliko Tarnovo

28 April 1971

FK Crvenka (Socialist Federal Republic of Yugoslavia)	4–2	(Bulgaria) Etar Veliko Tarnovo

Crvenka, Crvenka

5 May 1971

Etar Veliko Tarnovo (Bulgaria)	2–0	(Albania) Besa Kavajë

Ivaylo, Veliko Tarnovo

2 June 1971

Besa Kavajë (Albania)	2–1	(Bulgaria) Etar Veliko Tarnovo

Besa, Kavajë

23 June 1971

Besa Kavajë (Albania)	1–0	(Socialist Federal Republic of Yugoslavia) FK Crvenka

Besa, Kavajë

30 June 1971

FK Crvenka (Socialist Federal Republic of Yugoslavia)	2–2	(Albania) Besa Kavajë

Crvenka, Crvenka

=== Group B ===
Pos	Team	Pld	W	D	L	GF	GA	GR	Pts	Qualification
1	(Greece) Panionios (A)	4	2	1	1	5	3	1.667	5	Advances to finals
2	(Romania) Steagul Roșu Brașov	4	1	2	1	4	3	1.333	4	
3	(Turkey) Altay	4	1	1	2	2	5	0.400	3	

Source: rsssf.com
Rules for classification: 1) points; 2) goal average; 3) number of goals scored
(A) Advance to a further round
9 June 1971

Altay (Turkey)	2–1	(Greece) Panionios
Böke 60', 85'		Dedes 77'

Alsancak, İzmir

23 June 1971

Panionios (Greece)	1–0	(Turkey) Altay
Pantazis 12'

Nea Smyrni, Athens

8 August 1971

Steagul Roșu Brașov (Romania)	3–0	(Turkey) Altay
Florescu 4'; Györffy 62'; Gergely 76'

Tineretului, Brașov

15 August 1971

Altay (Turkey)	0–0	(Romania) Steagul Roșu Brașov

Alsancak, İzmir

8 September 1971

Steagul Roșu Brașov (Romania)	1–1	(Greece) Panionios

Tineretului, Brașov

27 October 1971

Panionios (Greece)	2–0	(Romania) Steagul Roșu Brașov

Nea Smyrni, Athens

== Finals ==
Team 1	Agg.	Team 2	1st leg	2nd leg
Panionios (Greece)	3–2	(Albania) Besa Kavajë	2–1	1–1

=== First leg ===
24 November 1971

Panionios (Greece)	2–1	(Albania) Besa Kavajë
Sagoridis 3', 78' (pen.)		Bishtaja 41'

Nea Smyrni, Athens
Attendance: 15,000
Referee: Doğan Babacan (Turkey)

=== Second leg ===
17 December 1971

Besa Kavajë (Albania)	1–1	(Greece) Panionios
Merhori 48'		Dedes 43'

Lokomotiva, Durrës

Panionios won 3–2 on aggregate.
