= Giorgos Daditsos =

Greek footballer (1953–2003)

- Giorgos Daditsos

Personal information
- Full name: Georgios Daditsos
- Date of birth: 9 March 1953
- Place of birth: Malesina, Greece
- Date of death: 20 August 2003 (aged 50)
- Place of death: Nikaia, Athens, Greece
- Height: 1.81 m (5 ft 11 in)
- Position: Goalkeeper

Youth career
- 1968–1975: AEK Athens

Senior career*
Years	Team	Apps	(Gls)
1974–1975	AEK Athens	0	(0)
1975–1977	Panachaiki	8	(0)
1977–1979	Fostiras		
1979–1981	Olympiakos Neon Liosion		
1981–1983	Egaleo	24	(0)
1983–1984	Atromitos Piraeus		
1984–1987	Proodeftiki		
1987–1989	Atromitos		
- * Club domestic league appearances and goals

Giorgos Daditsos (Greek: Γιώργος Δαδίτσος; 9 March 1953 – 20 August 2003) was a Greek professional footballer who played as a goalkeeper.

== Club career ==
Daditsos started his career in 1968 when he enrolled in the infrastructure departments of AEK Athens and competed in the youth teams playing as a goalkeeper. On 9 August 1974 he was promoted to the senior team, but he failed to establish himself in the team, as he did not make any appearances, staying in the "shadow" of the main goalkeepers, Giorgos Sidiropoulos and Lakis Stergioudas.

On 30 July 1975, he was transferred to Panachaiki, where he played until 1977. Afterwards, he moved to Fostiras for a season and then to Olympiakos Neon Liosion. On 18 August 1981 Daditsos signed for Egaleo. In 1983 he won promotion to the first division. Afterwards, he moved to Atromitos Piraeus for a season. On 7 July 1984 he signed at Proodeftiki, where he spent 3 seasons. On 20 November 1987 he signed with Atromitos, where he won the Gamma Ethniki in 1988. He played for the club of Peristeri until the summer of 1989, when he retired.

== Personal life ==
Daditsos continued to deal with football as an administrative agent in Proodeftiki, where he served as the General Leader. Professionally, he was engaged in the trade of sporting goods with sales shops in the regions of Aigaleo and Nikaia. He had a wife named Stavroula and two sons, Leonidas and Kostas. The later followed his footsteps as a goalkeeper, enrolling in the academy of AEK Athens. He was promoted in the senior team in 1998, playing for a season without making any appearances. On 20 August 2003 Daditsos died from acute mental swelling, at the age of only 50. Since then and in his memory, the veteran footballers of Proodeftiki and AEK have established an annual friendly match which is held at Nikaia Municipal Stadium.

== Honours ==
AEK Athens

- Alpha Ethniki: 1970–71

Atromitos

- Gamma Ethniki: 1987–88
