= 1974–75 Greek Football Cup =

1974–75 Greek Cup
Tournament details
- Country: Greece
- Teams: 77

Final positions
- Champions: Olympiacos (16th title)
- Runners-up: Panathinaikos

Tournament statistics
- Matches played: 71
- Goals scored: 177 (2.49 per match)
- Top goal scorer(s): Michalis Kritikopoulos; Takis Nikoloudis (4 goals each)

The 1974–75 Greek Football Cup was the 33rd edition of the Greek Football Cup. The competition culminated with the Greek Cup Final, held at Karaiskakis Stadium, on 18 June 1975. The match was contested by Olympiacos and Panathinaikos, with Olympiacos winning by 1–0. Panathinaikos competed with their reserve (youth) team, as a protest for the decision of the HFF for the final to be held in Karaiskakis Stadium, home ground of Olympiacos.

== Calendar ==
Round	Date(s)	Fixtures	Clubs	New entries
First Round	14, 15 September 1974	30	60 → 31	60
Additional Round	23 October 1974	1	31 → 30	none
Second Round	30 October 1974	14	28 → 14	none
Round of 32	5 February 1975	15	32 → 16	18
Round of 16	19 March 1975	8	16 → 8	none
Quarter-finals	30 April 1975	4	8 → 4	none
Semi-finals	28 May 1975	2	4 → 2	none
Final	18 June 1975	1	2 → 1	none

== Knockout phase ==
In the knockout phase, teams play against each other over a single match. If the match ends up as a draw, extra time will be played. If a winner doesn't occur after the extra time the winner emerges by penalty shoot-out.
The mechanism of the draws for each round is as follows:

- There are no seedings, and teams from the same group can be drawn against each other.

== First round ==
Olympiacos Volos from Alpha Ethniki and 59 clubs from Beta Ethniki entered the first round.

Team 1	Score	Team 2
APO Rouf	1–2	Olympiacos Liosia
Paniliakos	2–1	Panarkadikos
A.F.C. Patra	3–2	Ionikos
Fostiras	1–2	Chania
Ikaros Nea Smyrni	1–2	Kallithea
Anagennisi Arta	2–0 (w/o)	Syros
Korinthos	0–3	Panelefsiniakos
Panargiakos	4–1	Vyzas Megara
Kerkyra	2–1	OFI
Chalkida	0–1	Panetolikos
Trikala	3–1	Proodeftiki
Karditsa A.C.	2–0 (w/o)	Phoebus Kremasti
Diagoras	0–1	Olympiacos Volos
Niki Volos	1–3	Moschato
Apollon Athens	3–0	Lamia
Rodos	2–1	Dimitra Trikala
Doxa Vyronas	1–0	Koropi
Levadiakos	2–0	Panaspropyrgiakos
Atromitos Piraeus	2–0	Anagennisi Karditsa
Ilisiakos	1–0	Acharnaikos
Veria	2–1 (a.e.t.)	Anagennisi Epanomi
Apollon Kalamarias	2–1	Nestos Chrysoupoli
Pierikos	2–0	Naoussa
Foinikas Polichni	1–1 (5–4 p)	Panthrakikos
Doxa Drama	7–0	Achilleas Farsala
Kozani	1–0 (a.e.t.)	Makedonikos
Pandramaikos	1–0	Moudania
Kilkisiakos	3–0	Xanthi
Ethnikos Sidirokastro	3–1	Makedonikos Siatista
Edessaikos	0–0 (4–3 p)	Almopos Aridea

== Additional round ==
Team 1	Score	Team 2
Atromitos Piraeus	2–1	Moschato

== Second round ==
Team 1	Score	Team 2
Panetolikos	3–0	A.F.C. Patra
Kallithea	2–0 (w/o)	Kerkyra
Olympiacos Liosia	1–2	Chania
Anagennisi Arta	2–0	Panelefsiniakos
Panargiakos	3–1	Paniliakos
Rodos	2–1	Atromitos Piraeus
Doxa Vyronas	1–2	Ilisiakos
Trikala	1–0	Levadiakos
Karditsa A.C.	3–0	Apollon Athens
Apollon Kalamarias	0–0 (5–4 p)	Doxa Drama
Foinikas Polichni	3–1	Kozani
Veria	1–0	Edessaikos
Pandramaikos	2–0	Pierikos
Kilkisiakos	0–0 (5–6 p)	Ethnikos Sidirokastro

== Bracket ==
Round of 32
Anagennisi Arta	0
Olympiacos	7
Panachaiki (p)	0(4)
Panserraikos	0(3)
Pandramaikos	1
Apollon Kalamarias	0
Egaleo	4
Foinikas Polichni	1
Chania (w/o)	2
Kastoria	0
PAOK	1
Ilisiakos	0
Aris (a.e.t.)	2
AEL	1
Panionios	2
Veria	1
Atromitos (a.e.t.)	3
Panargiakos	2
Trikala	1(4)
Iraklis (p)	1(5)
Ethnikos Piraeus	0
AEK Athens	2
Kavala	1
Ethnikos Sidirokastro	0
Rodos (p)	1(5)
Panetolikos	1(3)
Olympiacos Volos	1(2)
Kallithea (p)	1(3)
Α.Ο. Karditsa (p)	1(5)
Kalamata	1(4)
Panathinaikos	2
PAS Giannina	0

Round of 16
Olympiacos	1
Panachaiki	0
Pandramaikos (a.e.t.)	2
Egaleo	1
Chania	0
PAOK	1
Aris	1
Panionios	2
Atromitos	0
Iraklis	2
AEK Athens	3
Kavala	0
Rodos	2
Kallithea	0
A.O. Karditsa	0
Panathinaikos	1

Quarter-finals
Olympiacos	4
Pandramaikos	1
PAOK	1
Panionios	0
Iraklis	1
AEK Athens	0
Rodos	0
Panathinaikos (w/o)	2

Semi-finals
Olympiacos	4
PAOK	0
Iraklis	1
Panathinaikos	2

Final
Olympiacos	1
Panathinaikos	0

== Round of 32 ==
The rest 17 clubs from Alpha Ethniki entered the third round.

Team 1	Score	Team 2
Panathinaikos	2–0	PAS Giannina
Olympiacos Volos	1–1 (2–3 p)	Kallithea
Egaleo	4–1	Foinikas Polichni
Aris	2–1 (a.e.t.)	AEL
Trikala	1–1 (4–5 p)	Iraklis
Ethnikos Piraeus	0–2	AEK Athens
Rodos	1–1 (5–3 p)	Panetolikos
Pandramaikos	1–0	Apollon Kalamarias
Panachaiki	0–0 (4–3 p)	Panserraikos
Panionios	2–1	Veria
Anagennisi Arta	0–7	Olympiacos
Atromitos	3–2 (a.e.t.)	Panargiakos
Α.Ο. Karditsa	1–1 (5–4 p)	Kalamata
Kavala	1–0	Ethnikos Sidirokastro
PAOK	1–0	Ilisiakos
Chania	2–0 (w/o)	Kastoria

== Round of 16 ==
Team 1	Score	Team 2
Rodos	2–0	Kallithea
Pandramaikos	2–1 (a.e.t.)	Egaleo
Olympiacos	1–0	Panachaiki
AEK Athens	3–0	Kavala
A.O. Karditsa	0–1	Panathinaikos
Chania	0–1	PAOK
Atromitos	0–2	Iraklis
Aris	1–2	Panionios

== Quarter-finals ==
Team 1	Score	Team 2
Iraklis	1–0	AEK Athens
PAOK	1–0	Panionios
Olympiacos	4–1	Pandramaikos
Rodos	0–2^{*} (w/o)	Panathinaikos

^{*}Suspended at 75th minute while the score was 1–2 and was awarded to Panathinaikos.

== Semi-finals ==
Team 1	Score	Team 2
Olympiacos	4–0	PAOK
Iraklis	1–2	Panathinaikos

== Final ==
18 June 1975

Olympiacos	1–0	Panathinaikos
Davourlis 35'	Report

Karaiskakis Stadium, Piraeus
Attendance: 34,430
Referee: Gianfranco Menegalli (Italy)
