= Loukas Barlos =

Greek businessman (1920–1999)

- Loukas Barlos

22nd president of AEK Athens
- In office 9 March 1974 – 9 June 1981
- Preceded by: Ioannis Theodorakopoulos
- Succeeded by: Andreas Zafiropoulos

Personal details
- Born: 1920 Thessaloniki, Greece
- Died: 20 October 1999 (aged 78–79) Athens, Greece
- Spouse: Noni Vasiliadou
- Children: Thanasis Barlos; Lucy Barlos
- Occupation: Entrepreneur
- Known for: Owner of AEK Athens F.C.

Loukas Barlos (Greek: Λουκάς Μπάρλος; 1920 – 20 October 1999) was a Greek businessman who served as the twenty third president of AEK Athens F.C. from 1974 until 1981.

== Early life ==
Barlos was born and raised in Thessaloniki, but his place of origin was Distomo in Boeotia. As a youngster, he was a supporter of Aris and even tried out with the club. He was the owner of bauxite factories and other mining enterprises. In 1955, he married Noni Vasiliadou and later they had 2 children, Thanasis and Lucy.

== President of AEK Athens ==
On 9 March 1974, after the resignation of the then president Ioannis Theodorakopoulos from the previous December, he became democratically elected as the new president of AEK Athens with 58%. The team had won the championship since 1971 and were struggling, with many of their former stars were either retiring or leaving for other clubs.

Barlos immediately invested much of his own money and brought the manager František Fadrhonc to the club, as well as players such as Christos Ardizoglou, Giorgos Skrekis, Giorgos Dedes, Walter Wagner and Timo Zahnleiter. In 1976, he further improved AEK by acquiring Thomas Mavros, Takis Nikoloudis and Nikos Christidis. Dušan Bajević and Milton Viera joined the following year making the team even more powerful. These moved lead to AEK Athens to winning two successive Greek championships, a double in 1978 and an impressive course to the semi-finals of the UEFA Cup in 1977.

"I do not want to take from AEK, I just wanted to give. I am not an investor and I probably do not have a place in modern football. I thank God for the moments He gave me at AEK. This club is the most important thing I've had in my life"

— Statements of Loukas Barlos on leaving AEK in 1981

In addition to the team's competitive renaissance, Barlos also became their benefactor in matters of facilities, since during his days the club's indoor basketball court and the two-story "covered" stands of the Nea Filadelfeia Stadium were founded. He did not hesitate to mortgage his property and his house to help the club financially.

On 9 June 1981, his dire financial situation that came from his involvement with the club, but also due to his inability to follow the new model of professional football, fearing alienation through the professionalism that was entering into the field of football, Barlos resigned from the presidency of AEK. Despite his departure, he remained close to the club.

== Death ==
Barlos died of lung cancer on 20 October 1999. He is buried in his place of origin, Distomo.
