= Georgios Dedes =

Greek footballer

Personal information
- Full name: Georgios Dedes
- Date of birth: 25 February 1943 (age 83)
- Place of birth: Nafplio, Greece
- Height: 1.75 m (5 ft 9 in)
- Position: Forward

Youth career
- 1958–1961: Phivos Neos Kosmos

Senior career*
Years	Team	Apps	(Gls)
1961–1974	Panionios	358	(149)
1974–1977	AEK Athens	64	(29)
1977–1978	Panionios	8	(3)
Total		430	(181)

International career
1962–1963	Greece U18	8	(3)
1965	Greece military		
1966–1973	Greece	20	(7)
1969	Greece U21	1	(0)
- * Club domestic league appearances and goals

Georgios Dedes (Greek: Γεώργιος Δέδες; born 25 February 1943) is a Greek former professional footballer who played as a forward. His main characteristics were his speed, his technique and his shooting. He competed in 430 games in total on the Greek Championship for Panionios and AEK Athens, scoring 182 goals. He was the top scorer of the league in 1971 and 1976. In 1971, he was also awarded the Bronze boot after becoming the third best scorer in Europe.

== Club career ==
=== Early years ===
In 1957 his family moved to Athens and Dedes played alongside his brother for Phivos Neos Kosmos. In 1960–61, Phivos won the B1 league of Athens Football Clubs Association and Dedes was one of their main scorers.

=== Panionios ===
At the age of 17 he was discovered by Panagiotis Pallas of Panionios and he was recommended to the technical director of the team, Thanasis Papathanasiou. Dedes was transferred to Panionios on atransfer fee of 1,000 drachmas and some players as an exchange. Two months later, the coach of the team, Ioannis Skordillis and Nikos Zakardis gave him the chance to play for the first time against Fostiras. On 28 March 1965 Dedes scored the fastest hat-trick in league in a period of 120 seconds after the 88th minute. In the 1969–70 season, Dedes scored five goals in a game in an 8–0 victory against Olympiakos Nicosia, which is the club's largest victory. That was a rare record which only a few Greek footballers have achieved. Dedes has also scored four goals in a match on two occasions. He played for Panionios for 14 years, winning a Balkans Cup in 1971, while his team finished second in the Championship at the same year. He was the top scorer of the Greek Championship with 28 goals, becoming the 3rd scorer in Europe behind the Croatian, Josip Skoblar of Marseille with 39 and Salif Keita of Saint-Étienne with 33.

=== AEK Athens ===
On 8 August 1974, Dedes was transferred to AEK Athens of Loukas Barlos. The deal also included the acquisition of his teammates, Giorgos Skrekis and Victoras Theofilopoulos, while Panionios received the amount of 2 million drachmas plus Kostas Panagiotopoulos, Babis Psimogiannos and Ivan Kypritidis as exchange. On 6 October 1974 he scored his first hat-trick with the yellow-blacks in the 5–1 win at home against AEL. He helped his team take the win in the derby against Panathinaikos at home by scoring a goal in the final 4–3, on 20 April 1975. He scored 3 of the 4 goals of his team completing a hat-trick against Kastoria on 5 October 1975. He scored another hat-trick on 16 May 1976 in the imposing 5–0 home win over Pierikos. In his three-year spell at AEK Athens he once more became the top scorer of the league in 1976 with 15 goals. In the following season, he was a member of the squad that reached to the semi-finals of the UEFA Cup.

=== Return to Panionios and retirement ===
On 12 August 1977, Dedes returned to Panionios for one season to finish his career in his beloved club. He was honoured with the Golden Cross, the club's greatest award, for his overall contribution. Dedes described the award as "priceless" and it is the centerpiece of his medal collection.

== International career ==
In 1962, Dedes was called to Greece U18, for which he played in two matches against Turkey, a 1–0 defeat in Athens and 1–0 win in Smyrni where he was the scorer in the 18th minute. With the U-19 team he competed in two games for the qualifying matches of UEFA European Under-19 Championship against Turkey. With a 2–1 victory in Athens and a 1–1 draw in Ankara, Greece managed to qualify for 1963 UEFA European Under-18 Championship in London. Dedes played in both 3 matches of the tournament in which he scored two goals in a 7–2 victory against Germany. Greece didn't qualify for the quarter-finals as they finished third in the group.

In 1969, Dedes played the only game for Greece U21 against Israel.

He managed 20 appearances and scored seven goals for Greece from 1966 to 1973. He played his first match on 16 October 1966 in a 2–1 win against Finland for the UEFA Euro 1968 qualifying. He scored his first two goals for Greece on 21 November 1968 in a 4–1 home victory against Egypt. Dedes was a regular in the 1970 FIFA World Cup qualification squad where he scored twice. His first goal for the tournament was in a historical 2–1 victory against Portugal on 11 December 1968 in Karaiskakis Stadium and the second was in a 2–2 draw against Romania on 16 April 1969 with Dedes taking the lead for Greece. He made his last appearance for Greece on 31 January 1973 in a match against Bulgaria as a second-half substitute in a match which ended 2–2.

== After football ==
After the end of his career, he was involved for many years in the clothing business. In 1999 he returned to Panionios to take over the position of general manager. In collaboration with Stathis Chaitas, he was in charge of finding talented players. On 3 January 2022 Dedes offered his golden shoe he won in 1976 to the Museum of AEK Athens.

== Personal life ==
Dedes was the son of Athanasios and Nikoleta and the fifth of their six children. He was nephew of the legendary goalkeeper of AEK Athens, Christos Ribas, and his elder brother, Kostas played for Pannafpliakos. As a boy he supported AEK Athens and he was a great fan of Kostas Nestoridis. From his marriage he has two sons, Thanasis and Christos.

== Honours ==
Panionios

- Balkans Cup: 1971

Individual

- Alpha Ethniki top scorer: 1970–71, 1975–76
- European Golden Boot: 1971 (third place)
- Panionios Golden Cross: 1978
