= Walter Wagner (footballer) =

German footballer

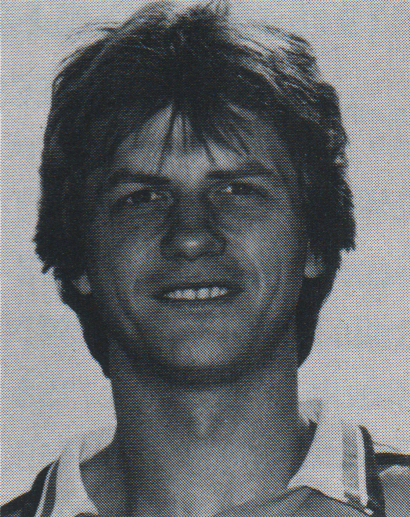
- Wagner in 1979

Personal information
- Full name: Walter-Michael Wagner
- Date of birth: 26 July 1949 (age 77)
- Place of birth: Lohra, West Germany
- Position: Forward

Senior career*
Years	Team	Apps	(Gls)
–1969	VfB Altenvers		
1969–1971	Eintracht Frankfurt	11	(0)
1971–1972	SSV Reutlingen	26	(7)
1972–1974	Austria Wien		
1974–1977	AEK Athens	92	(40)
1977–1978	Aris	28	(6)
1978–1979	Panathinaikos	17	(3)
1979	Los Angeles Aztecs	21	(8)
1979–1980	SV Röchling Völklingen	11	(4)
1980–1981	Panachaiki	21	(3)
1981–1982	SG Wattenscheid 09	17	(5)
- * Club domestic league appearances and goals

Walter Wagner (born 26 July 1949) is a German former professional footballer who played as a forward. His nickname was "Wawa".

== Career ==
Wagner played for Eintracht Frankfurt between 1969 and 1971. In the 1971 he played for one season in SSV Reutlingen, a 2nd division team. Afterwards, he played in Austria Wien for 2 seasons.

In the summer of 1974, Wagner moved to Greece and signed for AEK Athens. On 12 December 1976 he scored a hat-trick on a 4–1 against Ethnikos Piraeus He was a member of the squad that made it to the semi-finals of the UEFA Cup, scoring in total on both legs against Derby County for the second round. He also scored the winner in the match against Olympiacos on 13 March 1977. In the summer of 1977, although there was the intention to stay as long as he acquired Greek citizenship, his contract was ultimately not renewed.

Nevertheless, his desire of staying in Greece resulted in his move to Aris on 1 August 1977, where he played for a season. Afterwards, he played for another season at Panathinaikos, but without a particular success.

In 1979 Wagner moved in the USA and the Los Angeles Aztecs and in the same year he returned to Germany and joined SV Röchling Völklingen. A few months later he went to Greece, but this time to play for Panachaiki. He left after one year and joined SG Wattenscheid 09, where he ended his career in 1982.
