= František Fadrhonc =

Dutch football manager (1914–1981)

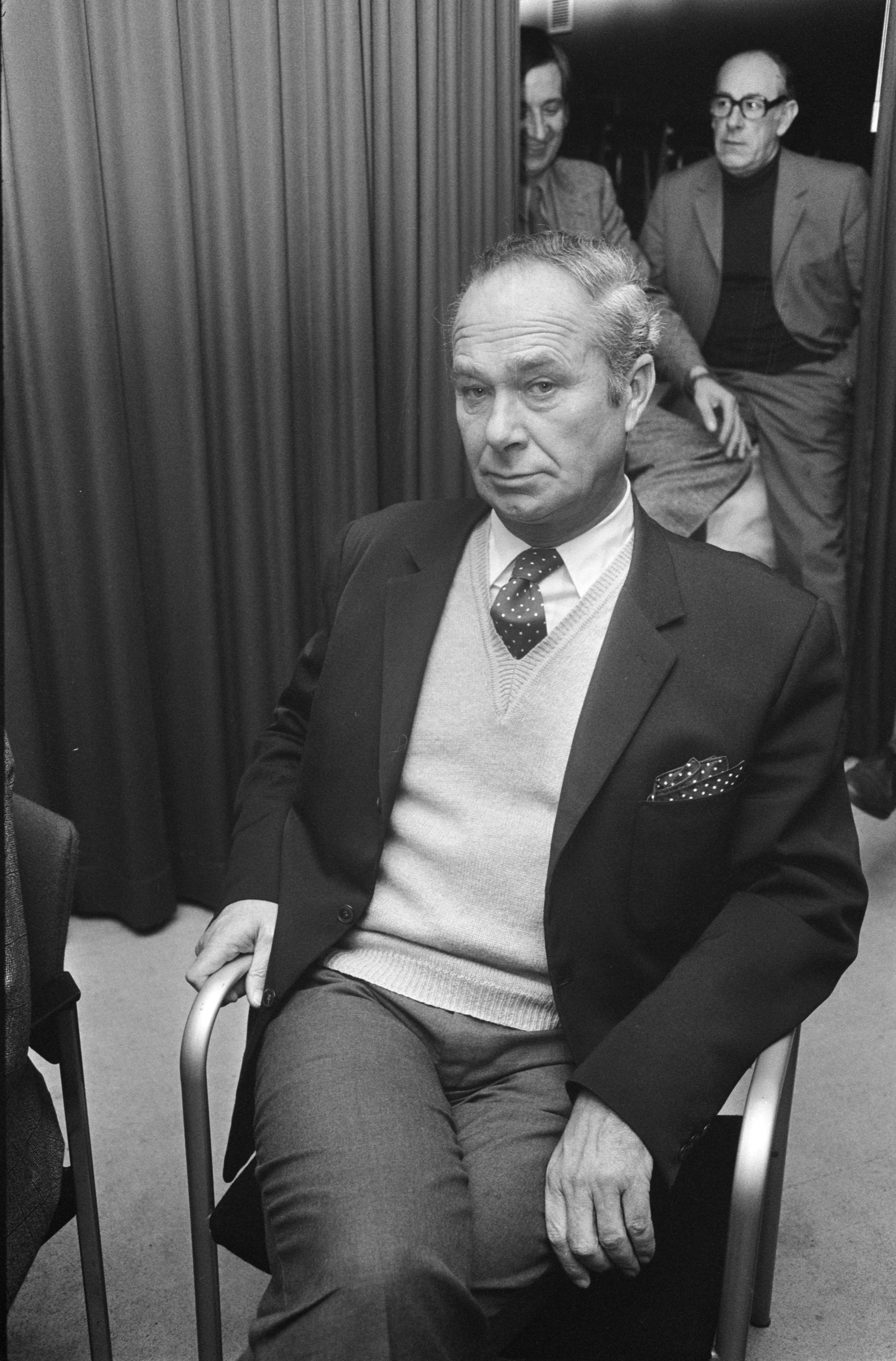
- Fadrhonc pictured in 1974

Personal information
- Date of birth: 18 December 1914
- Place of birth: Nymburk, Austria-Hungary
- Date of death: 9 October 1981 (aged 66)
- Place of death: Nicosia, Cyprus

Managerial career
- Years: Team
- 1949–1956: Willem II
- 1956–1962: SC Enschede
- 1962–1970: Go Ahead Eagles
- 1970–1974: Netherlands
- 1974: Netherlands (assistant)
- 1974–1977: AEK Athens
- 1978: OFI
- 1978–1979: Panachaiki
- 1980–1981: AEK Athens (assistant)
- 1981: Keravnos Strovolou

František Fadrhonc (18 December 1914 – 9 October 1981) was a Czech football manager, who was born in Nymburk, Austria-Hungary, present day Czech Republic.

== Career ==
=== Eredivisie ===
Fadrhonc began his managerial career in 1949 at the bench of Willem II, where he won the Championship in 1952 and 1955. In 1956 he signed for SC Enschede staying at the bench of the club until 1962, when he became the manager of Go Ahead Eagles until 1970.

=== Netherlands national football team ===
In 1970, Fadrhonc took over the Netherlands national team. Under his management in 1974 they managed to qualify for the FIFA World Cup after 36 years, besting their rivals Belgium among others. However, in the tournament Rinus Michels took over the bench of the team with Fadrhonc remaining as his assistant. The duo led the Netherlands in the final of that tournament losing to West Germany.

=== AEK Athens ===
On 2 August 1974, after the end of the World Cup, Fadrhonc moved to Greece and signed for AEK Athens. With the support of the president, Loukas Barlos he built a team that reached the semi-finals of the UEFA Cup in the 1977. In fact in the second leg of the quarter-finals against QPR, while the match was leading to a penalty shoutout, Fadrhonc used his substitution to replace regular goalkeeper, Lakis Stergioudas with the veteran Nikos Christidis. His move was justified since Christidis saved two penalties and AEK went through to the semi-finals. On 23 September 1977 Fadrhonc was removed from the bench AEK, due to the differences he had with Barlos regarding the planning of the future roster.

=== Later career in Greece ===
On 6 December 1977, he signed for OFI, with the deal becoming effective from 1 January 1978. On 26 June 1978, Fadrhonc became the manager of Panachaiki, until 19 March 1979, when he was fired. On 21 March 1979 he returned to AEK and took change of the club's academies. On 26 March 1980, when the rookie Miltos Papapostolou took charge of the bench of AEK, Fadrhonc became his assistant and he also assumed the position of the fitness coach. With the removal of Papapostolou in the summer of 1981, he was removed as well.

=== Keravnos Strovolou and death ===
On 13 August 1981, with the help of an official of AEK, Vasos Chatziioanou, Fadrhonc was hired as the head coach of Keravnos Strovolou in Cyprus. He died on 9 October at age of 66, shortly after his debut at the club.

== Honours ==
Willem II

- Netherlands Football League Championship: 1951–52, 1954–55
