= 1968–69 AEK Athens F.C. season =

AEK Athens
1968–69 season
- Chairman: Kosmas Kyriakidis (until 17 June); Georgios Chrysafidis
- Manager: Branko Stanković
- Stadium: AEK Stadium
- Alpha Ethniki: 6th
- Greek Cup: Round of 16
- European Cup: Quarter-finals
- Top goalscorer: League: Mimis Papaioannou (20); All: Mimis Papaioannou (27)
- Highest home attendance: 29,842 vs Spartak Trnava (12 March 1969)
- Lowest home attendance: 2,162 vs AEL Limassol (8 June 1969)
- Average home league attendance: 17,567
- Biggest win: AEL Limassol 0–5 AEK Athens; AEK Athens 5–0 Lamia
- Biggest defeat: Panachaiki 4–2 AEK Athens; Panionios 2–0 AEK Athens; Aris 2–0 AEK Athens; OFI 2–0 AEK Athens (w/o)
Home colours

The 1968–69 season was the 45th season in the existence of AEK Athens F.C. and the tenth consecutive season in the top flight of Greek football. They competed in the Alpha Ethniki, the Greek Cup and the European Cup. The season began on 18 September 1968 and finished on 15 June 1969.

== Overview ==
The season found AEK in a transitional period with the changing of the manager, as the way of training the football players changed radically. The championship win in 1968 was accompanied by the departure of Jenő Csaknády and the arrival of an equally capable manager was deemed imperative. Thus, the Yugoslav manager Branko Stanković was hired, who had already presented achievements with Vojvodina and as a member of the coaching staff at Yugoslavia. The management of the team, due to a lack of sufficient money, did not proceed with big transfer moves. They acquired a couple of young footballers from smaller clubs, while also counted on players such Lavaridis, Stathopoulos, Simigdalas, Sevastopoulos, Ventouris, who were previously decommissioned. The preparation of the team under Stanković was based on the modern football of the period, which was characterized by tactics, technique and physical strength, while the discipline of the footballers was a prerequisite for their progress, as well as that of the team. However, due to the players had not yet adapted to the new way of working to fully respond, the several injuries that limited the options and the advanced age of some of them, affected the course of the team in the start the season.

For the first round of the European Cup AEK were lucky to be drawn against Jeunesse Esch from Luxembourg. At Nea Filadelfeia, the club prevailded harder than the final 3–0 implied. The qualification was at safety and the rematch became purely procedural. At Luxembourg, the suspense of qualification lasted for 16 minutes when AEK equalized the quick goal of Jeunesse Eschs. AEK also managed to take the lead with a second goal by Ventouris, but the players of Legrand showing character evenatully turned the match again taking the victory. In the second round AEK faced the Danish Akademisk Boldklub. At AEK Stadium, despite their offensive style of play, AEK played defensively for the whole match and managed to take the draw by 0–0. At the rematch in the frozen Copenhagen, AEK started the match very offensively and managed to take the lead early on with Stamatiadis. The Danes started to press unbearably to equalize, but thanks to Konstantinidis and Vasiliou, AEK went for the half time break with their lead intact. In the second half the yellow-blacks took advantage of the open spaces left by the Danes and played to extend their lead. Αt the 81st minute, after a cross by Sevastopoulos and Papaioannou with his unnatural jump, beat everyone in the air and made the final 0–2. AEK achieved the very first display of a Greek team in Europe, as they became the first team to achieve an away victory in a European match and the first Greek team to reach the quarter-finals of the European Cup, or in any European competition at all. In the quarter-finals AEK avoided all the giants of the draw as they faced the Czechoslovak Spartak Trnava. At the first match at Spartak Stadium The yellow-blacks played in order to maintain a favourable score for the rematch and after they withstood the pressure of the Czechoslovaks despite conceding two goals, they managed to reduce their lead with Sevastopoulos, achieving their target. The rematch in Athens, AEK seemed ready to respond to their challenge and take the qualification, but unfortunately, a quick goal by the Czechoslovaks forced the yellow-blacks to chase the score, as Spartak closed all spaces behind. AEK attacked with everything they got, but the Czechoslovak defense seemed impenetrable. Nonetheless, at the 77th minute AEK managed to equalize with Papaioannou and had only 13 minute to take the match to the extra time. Even though the team pressed intensively for another goal the ball would not go in the net and AEK left the tournament with pride, as they made one of their greatest ever achievements reality.

In the Cup, AEK easily eliminated Lamia, at the round of 32 with 5–0 at home. However, at the round of 16 they faced Panachaiki and were eliminated with a 4–2 away defeat.

AEK started the Championship in bad manner, but afterwards, they continued with five consecutive victories. One of these was an emphatic 3–2 away win against Olympiacos with Papaioannou playing as goalkeeper from the 85th minute, due to the suspension of Serafidis and even making two saves that secured the victory. AEK were consistently close in claiming the title, until they were defeated at home 0–1 by Olympiacos at the 22nd matchday. The end of the championship found AEK in the 6th place with 74 points and a long distance from the champion Panathinaikos with 90 points. As a result, they didn't qualify in any European competition for the next season. At the end of the season, Stanković planned a big renewal of the team's roster in order to improve their weaknesses and make their comeback in claiming titles.

== Management team ==
| Position | Staff |
|---|---|
| Manager | (Socialist Federal Republic of Yugoslavia) Branko Stanković |
| Assistant manager | (Greece) Giorgos Gasparis |
| Technical director | (Greece) Kleanthis Maropoulos |
| Academy director | (Greece) Georgios Daispangos |
| Academy manager | (Greece) Georgios Daispangos |

== Players ==
=== Squad information ===
NOTE: The players are the ones that have been announced by the AEK Athens' press release. No edits should be made unless a player arrival or exit is announced. Updated 15 June 1969, 23:59 UTC+2.

| Player | Nat. | Position(s) | Date of birth (Age) | Signed | Previous club | Transfer fee | Contract until |
Goalkeepers
| Stelios Serafidis | (Greece) | GK | 6 August 1935 (aged 33) | 1953 | (Greece) AEK Athens U20 | — | 1976 |
| Theodoros Maniateas | (Greece) | GK | 19 March 1945 (aged 24) | 1963 | (Greece) Panthisiakos | Free | 1976 |
| Stelios Konstantinidis | (Greece) | GK | 6 June 1947 (aged 22) | 1967 | (Greece) AEK Athens U20 | — | 1976 |
| Giannis Kokkinos | (Greece) | GK | 1950 (aged 18–19) | 1969 | (Greece) AEK Athens U20 | — | 1977 |
Defenders
| Alekos Sofianidis | (Greece) (Turkey) | LB / LM / LW | 3 August 1935 (aged 33) | 1959 | (Turkey) Beşiktaş | Free | 1976 |
| Aleko Yordan | (Turkey) (Greece) | CB | 10 January 1938 (aged 31) | 1964 | (Turkey) Beykoz | Free | 1976 |
| Tasos Vasiliou | (Greece) | CB | 4 August 1938 (aged 30) | 1965 | (Greece) Apollon Athens | ₯1,200,000 | 1976 |
| Giorgos Kefalidis | (Greece) | RB / CB | 21 March 1941 (aged 28) | 1964 | (Greece) Pierikos | ₯800,000 | 1976 |
| Fotis Balopoulos | (Greece) | CB / DM / CM / ST | 17 December 1943 (aged 25) | 1964 | (Greece) Proodeftiki | ₯450,000 | 1976 |
| Lakis Frogoudakis | (Greece) | LB / RB / CB / DM | 1944 (aged 24–25) | 1964 | (Greece) AEK Athens U20 | — | 1976 |
| Giannis Spyropoulos | (Greece) | CB / RB | 1945 (aged 23–24) | 1968 | (Greece) PAO Patisia | Free | 1976 |
| Christos Antonopoulos | (Greece) | CB / DM | 14 August 1946 (aged 22) | 1968 | (Greece) AE Pangrati | ₯120,000 | 1976 |
| Giannis Stavrou | (Greece) | RB / LB / CB | 6 January 1947 (aged 22) | 1967 | (Greece) AEK Athens U20 | — | 1976 |
| Nikos Karapoulitidis | (Greece) | LB / RB / CB | 30 November 1948 (aged 20) | 1968 | (Greece) AEK Athens U20 | — | 1976 |
Midfielders
| Stelios Skevofilakas | (Greece) | LM / RM / AM / CM | 6 January 1939 (aged 30) | 1961 | (Greece) Eleftheroupoli | Free | 1976 |
| Panagiotis Ventouris | (Greece) | LM / RM / LW / RW / ST / AM / SS | 1 March 1943 (aged 26) | 1965 | (Greece) Fostiras | ₯400,000 | 1976 |
| Nikos Stathopoulos | (Greece) | LM / LB / CM | 8 November 1943 (aged 25) | 1966 | (Greece) AEK Athens U20 | — | 1976 |
| Michalis Simigdalas | (Greece) | CM / RM / LM / RB / LB | 23 June 1944 (aged 25) | 1963 | (Greece) AEK Athens U20 | — | 1976 |
| Minas Stavridis | (Greece) | AM / SS / ST | 13 April 1945 (aged 24) | 1968 | (Greece) Ionikos | ₯200,000 | 1976 |
| Giorgos Karafeskos | (Greece) | CM / DM / RM / RW | 8 December 1946 (aged 22) | 1965 | (Greece) AEK Athens U20 | — | 1976 |
| Giorgos Lavaridis | (Greece) | CM / DM / CB | 15 October 1947 (aged 21) | 1968 | (Greece) AEK Athens U20 | — | 1976 |
Forwards
| Andreas Stamatiadis (Captain) | (Greece) | RW / LW / SS / AM | 16 August 1935 (aged 33) | 1952 | (Greece) AEK Athens U20 | — | 1976 |
| Kostas Papageorgiou | (Greece) | ST / SS / RW / LW | 1 January 1941 (aged 28) | 1963 | (Greece) Atromitos | ₯200,000 | 1976 |
| Mimis Papaioannou | (Greece) | SS / ST / AM / RW | 17 November 1942 (aged 26) | 1962 | (Greece) Veria | ₯175,000 | 1976 |
| Spyros Pomonis | (Greece) | LW / LM | 12 February 1944 (aged 25) | 1960 | (Greece) AEK Athens U20 | — | 1976 |
| Nikos Exarchidis | (Greece) | ST | 1944 (aged 24–25) | 1966 | (Greece) Niki Plaka | Free | 1976 |
| Kostas Nikolaidis | (Greece) | RW / LW / SS / ST | 10 September 1944 (aged 24) | 1965 | (Greece) PAO Safraboli | ₯400,000 | 1976 |
| Kosmas Pesiridis | (Greece) | RW / LW | 30 October 1947 (aged 21) | 1968 | (Greece) AON Argyroupoli | ₯250,000 | 1976 |
| Dimitris Kyrmizas | (Greece) | ST | 1947 (aged 21–22) | 1967 | (Greece) AEK Athens U20 | — | 1976 |
| Andreas Karakidis | (Greece) | ST | 1949 (aged 19–20) | 1968 | (Greece) AEK Athens U20 | — | 1976 |
Left during season
| Nikos Sevastopoulos | (Greece) | RW / SS / AM / ST | 26 February 1945 (aged 24) | 1963 | (Greece) AEK Athens U20 | — | 1976 |

== Transfers ==
=== In ===
| Pos. | Player | From | Fee | Date | Contract Until | Source |
|---|---|---|---|---|---|---|
| GK | (Greece) Giannis Kokkinos | (Greece) AEK Athens U20 | Promotion | 9 June 1969 | 30 June 1977 | |
| DF | (Greece) Giannis Spyropoulos | (Greece) PAO Patisia | Free transfer | 31 July 1968 | 30 June 1976 | |
| DF | (Greece) Christos Antonopoulos | (Greece) AE Pangrati | ₯120,000^{[a]} | 20 July 1968 | 30 June 1976 | |
| DF | (Greece) Nikos Karapoulitidis | (Greece) AEK Athens U20 | Promotion | 27 August 1968 | 30 June 1976 | |
| MF | (Greece) Giorgos Lavaridis | (Greece) AEK Athens U20 | Promotion | 27 August 1968 | 30 June 1976 | |
| MF | (Greece) Minas Stavridis | (Greece) Ionikos | ₯200,000^{[b]} | 31 July 1968 | 30 June 1976 | |
| FW | (Greece) Kosmas Pesiridis | (Greece) AON Argyroupoli | ₯250,000 | 27 July 1968 | 30 June 1976 | |
| FW | (Greece) Nikos Sevastopoulos | (South Africa) Hellenic | Loan return | 1 July 1968 | 30 June 1976 | |
| FW | (Greece) Andreas Karakidis | (Greece) AEK Athens U20 | Promotion | 27 August 1968 | 30 June 1976 | |

a. plus Maskaleris, Petrou and Ioannidis from the reserve team as exchange, while AEK also signed Ioannis Papakonstantis for their reserve team.

b. plus Tochoumidis from the reserve team as exchange.

=== Out ===
| Pos. | Player | To | Fee | Date | Source |
|---|---|---|---|---|---|
| FW | (Greece) Vasilis Mastrakoulis | Retired | | 31 July 1968 | |

=== Loan out ===
| Pos. | Player | To | Fee | Date | Until | Option to buy | Source |
|---|---|---|---|---|---|---|---|
| FW | (Greece) Nikos Sevastopoulos | (South Africa) Hellenic | Free | 16 April 1969 | 14 September 1969 | ✗ | |

=== Overall transfer activity ===
Expenditure: ▼ ₯570,000

Income: ▲ ₯0

Net Total: ▼ ₯570,000

== Pre-season and friendlies ==
| 18 August 1968 Friendly | AEK Athens | 2–1 | Apollon Athens | Nea Smyrni |
| 17:30 EET (UTC+2) | Papaioannou 78'; Karafeskos 84' | Report | Geroukalis 28' | Stadium: Nea Smyrni Stadium; Attendance: 2,169; Referee: Giannis Korkidis (Athens) |

| 21 August 1968 Friendly | AEK Athens | 9–1 | Panerythraikos | Kifissia |
| 17:00 EET (UTC+2) | Nikolaidis 6', 21', 26'; Karafeskos 24', 38', 49'; Papaioannou 32', 41', 85' | Report | Sideris 88' | Stadium: Zirineio Stadium; Referee: Branko Stanković |

| 23 August 1968 Friendly | A.O. Kifisia | 1–9 | AEK Athens | Kifissia |
| 17:15 EET (UTC+2) | Vasileiou 14' | Report | Ventouris 21', 31', 41'; Nikolaidis 35', 81'; Karafeskos 69'; Skevofilakas 72'; Sofianidis 75'; Papaioannou 87' | Stadium: Zirineio Stadium; Referee: Giorgos Gasparis |

| 8 September 1968 Friendly | Chalkida | 1–0 | AEK Athens | Chalcis |
| 16:45 EET (UTC+2) | Rogas 40' | Report | | Stadium: Municipal Stadium of Chalkida; Attendance: 4,000; Referee: Giannis Adamakis (Chalkida) |

| 12 September 1968 Friendly | Egaleo | 3–3 | AEK Athens | Aigaleo |
| 16:15 EET (UTC+2) | Giannakopoulos (penalty missed) 27', 68', 89' (pen.); Chrisostomou 74' | Report | Nikolaidis 10'; Papaioannou 34'; Papageorgiou 47' | Stadium: Stavros Mavrothalassitis Stadium; Referee: Fatouros |

| 15 September 1968 Friendly | PAOK | 1–2 | AEK Athens | Thessaloniki |
| 16:30 EET (UTC+2) | Mitrakas 47' | Report | Papageorgiou 30'; Ventouris 83' | Stadium: Toumba Stadium; Attendance: 11,529; Referee: Vlasiadis (Macedonia) |

| 26 September 1968 Friendly | AEK Athens | 3–2 | Ikaros Athens | Ampelokipoi |
| 20:30 EET (UTC+2) | Ventouris 22', 81'; Karafeskos 42' (pen.) | Report | Ioannou 3'; Anthropellos 68' | Stadium: Leoforos Alexandras Stadium; Attendance: 5,000; Referee: Christos Karasoulas (Athens) |

| 13 October 1968 Charity match | Olympiacos | 3–0 | AEK Athens | Piraeus |
| 15:30 EET (UTC+2) | Liakos 35'; P. Vasiliou 49'; Michas 63' | Report | | Stadium: Karaiskakis Stadium; Attendance: 8,948; Referee: Karpodinis (Athens) |
Note: The match was made for the financial support of the footballer of Olympiacos, Aris Papazoglou who had been diagnosed with cancer. Thanasis Bebis and Elias Yfantis competed for a quarter with Olympiacos to honor Papazoglou.

| 3 November 1968 Friendly | Triglia Rafinas | 1–3 | AEK Athens | Rafina |
| | Stamatiou | Report | Pomonis; Kyrmizas; Pesiridis | Stadium: Rafina Stadium |

| 6 December 1968 Friendly | Olympiacos Volos | 1–2 | AEK Athens | Volos |
| | Pastamou 40' | Report | Simigdalas 15'; Kyrmizas 58' | Stadium: Volos Municipal Stadium; Attendance: 5,000; Referee: Karakostas (Thessaly) |

| 25 March 1969 Friendly | Triglia Rafinas | 0–2 | AEK Athens | Rafina |
| | | Report | Sevastopoulos 62'; Karakidis 81' | Stadium: Rafina Stadium; Referee: Chourmentis |
Note: The manager of Triglia Rafinas and veteran footballer of Olympiacos, Ilias Rosidis competed with his club.

| 6 April 1969 Friendly | Pankorinthiakos | 2–2 | AEK Athens | Corinth |
| | Kechagias; Dikaiolakos | Report | Papakonstantis; Pesiridis (red card) 65' | Stadium: KEN Corinth |

| 24 April 1969 Friendly | AEK Athens | 1–0 | Ikaros Athens | Nea Filadelfeia |
| 16:00 EET (UTC+2) | Ventouris 5' | Report | | Stadium: AEK Stadium; Referee: Georgios Daispangos |

| 27 April 1969 Friendly | AEK Athens | 1–1 | Ethnikos Piraeus | Nea Filadelfeia |
| 17:00 EET (UTC+2) | Ventouris 82' | Report | Tsokataridis 73' | Stadium: AEK Stadium; Attendance: 1,217; Referee: Geroukalis (Athens) |

| 1 May 1969 Friendly | AEK Athens | 0–2 | Apollon Athens | Nea Filadelfeia |
| 16:00 EET (UTC+2) | | Report | Andris 72'; N. Simigdalas 79' | Stadium: AEK Stadium; Attendance: 25,000; Referee: Lianos |

| 4 May 1969 Friendly | AEK Athens | 0–1 | Egaleo | Nea Filadelfeia |
| 17:00 EET (UTC+2) | | Report | Chrysostomou 45' | Stadium: AEK Stadium; Attendance: 1,663; Referee: Pan Marinos (Piraeus) |

| 21 May 1969 Friendly | Koropi | 2–2 | AEK Athens | Koropi |
| | Mintzias 3'; Pantazis 53' | Report | Karakidis 60', 83' | Stadium: Antonis Priftis Stadium |

| 18 June 1969 Friendly | AEK Athens | 1–1 | Athens XI | Nea Filadelfeia |
| 17:30 EET (UTC+2) | Sarris 7' | Report | Kapernekas 15' | Stadium: AEK Stadium; Referee: Christos Paschalidis (Athens) |

== Competitions ==
=== Overall record ===
| Competition | First match | Last match | Starting round | Final position | Record | | | | | | | |
| Competition | First match | Last match | Starting round | Final position | Pld | W | D | L | GF | GA | GD | Win % |
|---|---|---|---|---|---|---|---|---|---|---|---|---|
| Alpha Ethniki | 22 September 1968 | 15 June 1969 | Matchday 1 | 6th | 34 | 17 | 7 | 10 | 58 | 33 | +25 | 50.00 |
| Greek Cup | 14 May 1969 | 11 June 1969 | Round of 32 | Round of 16 | 2 | 1 | 0 | 1 | 7 | 4 | +3 | 50.00 |
| European Cup | 18 September 1968 | 12 March 1969 | First round | Quarter-finals | 6 | 2 | 2 | 2 | 9 | 6 | +3 | 33.33 |
| Total | | | | | 42 | 20 | 9 | 13 | 74 | 43 | +31 | 47.62 |

Last updated: 15 June 1969
Source: Competitions

=== Alpha Ethniki ===
==== League table ====
| Pos | Team | Pld | W | D | L | GF | GA | GD | Pts | Qualification or relegation |
|---|---|---|---|---|---|---|---|---|---|---|
| 4 | Panionios | 34 | 18 | 7 | 9 | 55 | 34 | +21 | 77 | Invitation for Inter-Cities Fairs Cup first round |
| 5 | PAOK | 34 | 16 | 10 | 8 | 58 | 37 | +21 | 76 | |
| 6 | AEK Athens (Note: AEK Athens were deducted 1 point.) | 34 | 17 | 7 | 10 | 58 | 33 | +25 | 74 | |
| 7 | Egaleo | 34 | 13 | 10 | 11 | 48 | 41 | +7 | 70 | |
| 8 | Ethnikos Piraeus | 34 | 12 | 10 | 12 | 43 | 45 | −2 | 68 | |

Source: RSSSF
Rules for classification: 1st points; 2nd decision match; 3rd head-to-head goal difference.

==== Results summary ====
| Overall | | | | | | | | Home | | | | | | Away | | | | | |
| Pld | W | D | L | GF | GA | GD | Pts | W | D | L | GF | GA | GD | W | D | L | GF | GA | GD |
|---|---|---|---|---|---|---|---|---|---|---|---|---|---|---|---|---|---|---|---|
| 34 | 17 | 7 | 10 | 58 | 33 | +25 | 74 | 13 | 0 | 4 | 38 | 12 | +26 | 4 | 7 | 6 | 20 | 21 | −1 |

Source: Competitive matches

==== Results by Matchday ====
| Round | 1 | 2 | 3 | 4 | 5 | 6 | 7 | 8 | 9 | 10 | 11 | 12 | 13 | 14 | 15 | 16 | 17 | 18 | 19 | 20 | 21 | 22 | 23 | 24 | 25 | 26 | 27 | 28 | 29 | 30 | 31 | 32 | 33 | 34 |
|---|---|---|---|---|---|---|---|---|---|---|---|---|---|---|---|---|---|---|---|---|---|---|---|---|---|---|---|---|---|---|---|---|---|---|
| Ground | A | H | A | H | A | H | A | H | H | A | A | H | A | H | Η | A | H | H | A | H | A | H | A | H | A | A | H | H | A | H | A | A | H | A |
| Result | D | L | D | L | W | W | W | W | W | W | D | W | D | W | W | W | W | W | D | W | D | L | D | W | L | L | L | W | L | W | L | L | W | L |
| Position | 7 | 13 | 10 | 13 | 12 | 9 | 6 | 5 | 4 | 3 | 3 | 3 | 3 | 3 | 3 | 3 | 3 | 2 | 3 | 2 | 3 | 3 | 3 | 3 | 3 | 3 | 3 | 3 | 3 | 3 | 3 | 4 | 4 | 6 |

Source: Competitive matches
A = Away; H = Home; W = Win; D = Draw; L = Loss; P = Postponed

==== Matches ====
| 22 September 1968 1 | Pierikos | 1–1 | AEK Athens | Katerini |
| 16:15 EET (UTC+2) | Foulidis 88' | | Papaioannou 46' | Stadium: Katerini Stadium; Attendance: 5,099; Referee: Timoleon Latsios (Larissa) |

| 17 October 1968 2 | AEK Athens | 1–2 | Vyzas Megara | Piraeus |
| 15:30 EET (UTC+2) | Papageorgiou 1' | | Kouvas 17'; Skrivanos 60' | Stadium: Karaiskakis Stadium; Referee: Christos Michas (Athens) |
Note: The game was originally to take place in 29 September but because of referendum of the country the 2nd matchday was postponed for the day after. However, on 2 October AEK had to play the rematch of the first round of the European Cup, thus the game was postponed again. The match took place at Karaiskakis Stadium due to construction works at AEK Stadium.

| 6 October 1968 3 | Ethnikos Piraeus | 1–1 | AEK Athens | Piraeus |
| 15:30 EET (UTC+2) | Zervoudakis 55' | | Papaioannou 88' | Stadium: Karaiskakis Stadium; Attendance: 23,863; Referee: Giannis Famelis (Athens) |

| 20 October 1968 4 | AEK Athens | 0–1 | PAOK | Piraeus |
| 15:30 EET (UTC+2) | | | Koudas 67' | Stadium: Karaiskakis Stadium; Attendance: 26,336; Referee: Nikos Giannopoulos (Athens) |
Note: The match took place at Karaiskakis Stadium due to construction works at AEK Stadium.

| 27 October 1968 5 | Olympiacos | 2–3 | AEK Athens | Piraeus |
| 15:30 EET (UTC+2) | Gioutsos (red card) 45'; Sideris 30', 63' (pen.) | | Nikolaidis 13'; Karafeskos 45+12' (pen.); Papaioannou 78'; Serafidis (red card) 86' | Stadium: Karaiskakis Stadium; Attendance: 36,589; Referee: Kostas Xanthoulis (Cyprus) |
Note: At 45th minute the match was interrupted for 12 minutes because of the intense protests of the players of Olympiacos to the referee, due to the penalty that was given against them. As a result of the protests, Gioutsos was explelled, while the referee continued the match with torn sleeve. At the 85th minute, Serafidis kicked Sideris who fouled him during an aerial intervention and was explelled as well. Despite Stanković had the right to make a substitute in the position of the goalkeeper, decided to use Papaioannou under the posts, who did two wonderful saves. By the end of the match Olympiacos filed a objection with the excuse that the last 15 minutes of the game was held without adequate lighting.

| 3 November 1968 6 | AEK Athens | 5–2 | Chalkida | Nea Filadelfeia |
| 15:15 EET (UTC+2) | Papaioannou 9', 16', 20'; Ventouris 60'; Karafeskos 89' (pen.) | | Emmanouilidis 24'; Koutsoudakis 48' | Stadium: AEK Stadium; Attendance: 19,303; Referee: Dimitris Protonotarios (Athens) |
Note: The hat-trick of Papaioannou in 11 minutes is the fastest an AEK player has ever scored.

| 10 November 1968 7 | Egaleo | 2–3 | AEK Athens | Aigaleo |
| 15:00 EET (UTC+2) | Giannakopoulos 68'; Lardas 82' | | Ventouris 34'; Stamatiadis 62'; Papageorgiou 72' | Stadium: Stavros Mavrothalassitis Stadium; Attendance: 14,137; Referee: Christos Michas (Athens) |

| 17 November 1968 8 | AEK Athens | 2–1 | Panserraikos | Nea Filadelfeia |
| 15:00 EET (UTC+2) | Nikolaidis 42', 47' | | Bitzidis 88' | Stadium: AEK Stadium; Attendance: 15,141; Referee: Kitsoukalis |

| 24 November 1968 9 | AEK Athens | 2–1 | Panionios | Nea Filadelfeia |
| 15:00 EET (UTC+2) | Sevastopoulos 25'; Pomonis 72' | | Intzoglou 56' | Stadium: AEK Stadium; Attendance: 17,964; Referee: Karpodinis (Athens) |

| 1 December 1968 10 | Panathinaikos | 1–2 | AEK Athens | Ampelokipoi |
| 15:00 EET (UTC+2) | Dimitriou 37' (pen.) | | Nikolaidis 21'; Skevofilakas 64' | Stadium: Leoforos Alexandras Stadium; Attendance: 22,803; Referee: Christos Michas (Athens) |

| 15 December 1968 11 | Iraklis | 2–2 | AEK Athens | Thessaloniki |
| 15:00 EET (UTC+2) | Zafiridis 33'; Fitilis 65' | | Skevofilakas 9'; Papageorgiou 86' | Stadium: Toumba Stadium; Attendance: 10,347; Referee: Manolis Panakis (Athens) |
Note: Held at Toumba Stadium, due to the anavailability of Kaftanzoglio Stadium.

| 22 December 1968 12 | AEK Athens | 5–1 | Trikala | Nea Filadelfeia |
| 15:00 EET (UTC+2) | Karafeskos 4'; Papaioannou 6'; Nikolaidis 22'; Kefalidis 44'; Papageorgiou 66' | | Zachos 20' | Stadium: AEK Stadium; Attendance: 9,599; Referee: Martinis (Thessaloniki) |

| 29 December 1968 13 | Veria | 1–1 | AEK Athens | Veria |
| 15:00 EET (UTC+2) | Th. Papadopoulos 71' | | Sevastopoulos 36' | Stadium: Veria Stadium; Attendance: 3,874; Referee: Timoleon Latsios (Larissa) |

| 5 January 1969 14 | AEK Athens | 3–0 | Aris | Nea Filadelfeia |
| 15:00 EET (UTC+2) | Sevastopoulos 29'; Papaioannou 56'; Nikolaidis 76' | | | Stadium: AEK Stadium; Attendance: 22,749; Referee: Giannis Famelis (Athens) |

| 12 January 1969 15 | AEK Athens | 1–0 | Apollon Athens | Nea Filadelfeia |
| 15:00 EET (UTC+2) | Nikolaidis 43' | | | Stadium: AEK Stadium; Attendance: 24,201; Referee: Kitsoukalis |

| 18 January 1969 16 | AEL Limassol | 0–5 | AEK Athens | Limassol |
| 14:30 EET (UTC+2) | | | Skevofilakas 6'; Papaioannou 21', 79'; Lavaridis 28'; Pomonis 61' (pen.) | Stadium: GSO Stadium; Attendance: 1,379; Referee: Giorgos Katsoras (Thessaloniki) |

| 26 January 1969 17 | AEK Athens | 3–0 | OFI | Nea Filadelfeia |
| 15:00 EET (UTC+2) | Stamatiadis 31'; Skevofilakas 53'; Sevastopoulos 70' | | | Stadium: AEK Stadium; Attendance: 18,134; Referee: Timoleon Latsios (Larissa) |

| 2 February 1969 18 | AEK Athens | 3–0 | Pierikos | Nea Filadelfeia |
| 15:15 EET (UTC+2) | Papaioannou 1', 83'; Karafeskos 40' | | | Stadium: AEK Stadium; Attendance: 19,574; Referee: Margaritis Doumousiadis (Magnesia) |

| 9 February 1969 19 | Vyzas Megara | 0–0 | AEK Athens | Megara |
| 15:15 EET (UTC+2) | | | Karafeskos (penalty missed) 90' | Stadium: Megara Stadium; Referee: Komninakis (Athens) |

| 16 February 1969 20 | AEK Athens | 2–0 | Ethnikos Piraeus | Nea Filadelfeia |
| 15:30 EET (UTC+2) | Papaioannou 35', 90' | | | Stadium: AEK Stadium; Attendance: 26,254; Referee: Christos Dilzas (Thessaloniki) |

| 23 February 1969 21 | PAOK | 1–1 | AEK Athens | Thessaloniki |
| 15:30 EET (UTC+2) | Terzanidis 23' | | Papaioannou 59' | Stadium: Toumba Stadium; Attendance: 18,247; Referee: Kostas Dikopoulos (Larissa) |

| 2 March 1969 22 | AEK Athens | 0–1 | Olympiacos | Nea Filadelfeia |
| 16:00 EET (UTC+2) | Vasiliou (red card) 87' | | Sideris 85' | Stadium: AEK Stadium; Attendance: 29,708; Referee: Christos Michas (Athens) |

| 19 March 1969 23 | Chalkida | 1–1 | AEK Athens | Chalcis |
| 16:00 EET (UTC+2) | Tokpasidis 37' | | Ventouris 40' | Stadium: Municipal Stadium of Chalkida; Referee: Leonidas Vamvakopoulos (Athens) |
Note: The match was originally scheduled to take place on 9 March, but it was postponed because of the mateh against Spartak Trnava for the quarter-finals of the European Cup on 12 March.

| 21 December 1969 24 | AEK Athens | 1–0 | Egaleo | Nea Filadelfeia |
| 15:00 EET (UTC+2) | Papaioannou 47' | | | Stadium: AEK Stadium; Attendance: 13,032; Referee: Pipergias (Macedonia) |
Note: A minute of silence was held in honour of Giannis Serafimidis, a 56-year-old fan of AEK, who in the recent European game against Spartak Trnava suffered a fatal heart attack at the moment the opposite side scored.

| 23 March 1969 25 | Panserraikos | 1–0 | AEK Athens | Serres |
| 16:30 EET (UTC+2) | Stavlas 19' | | | Stadium: Serres Municipal Stadium; Attendance: 7,931; Referee: Timoleon Latsios (Larissa) |

| 30 March 1969 26 | Panionios | 2–0 | AEK Athens | Nea Smyrni |
| 16:30 EET (UTC+2) | Dedes 35'; Intzoglou 56' | | | Stadium: Nea Smyrni Stadium; Attendance: 9,986; Referee: Pan Marinos (Piraeus) |

| 6 April 1969 27 | AEK Athens | 1–2 | Panathinaikos | Nea Filadelfeia |
| 16:30 EET (UTC+2) | Pomonis 15' | | Kalaitzidis 27'; Mitropoulos 44' | Stadium: AEK Stadium; Attendance: 28,565; Referee: Timoleon Latsios (Larissa) |

| 20 April 1969 28 | AEK Athens | 3–0 | Iraklis | Nea Filadelfeia |
| 15:00 EET (UTC+2) | Papaioannou 27'; Ventouris 74'; Nikolaidis 84' | | Fytilis (penalty missed) 88' | Stadium: AEK Stadium; Attendance: 8,349; Referee: Stathis Papavasiliou (Piraeus) |

| 11 May 1969 29 | Trikala | 1–0 | AEK Athens | Trikala |
| 17:00 EET (UTC+2) | Beveniou 56' | | | Stadium: Trikala Municipal Stadium; Attendance: 6,378; Referee: Giorgos Katsoras (Thessaloniki) |

| 18 May 1969 30 | AEK Athens | 2–1 | Veria | Nea Filadelfeia |
| 17:30 EET (UTC+2) | Stamatiadis (penalty missed) 38'; Simigdalas 52'; Karafeskos 54' (pen.) | | Papafotiou 70' | Stadium: Nikos Goumas Stadium; Attendance: 6,337; Referee: Christos Dilzas (Thessaloniki) |
Note: When AEK won a penalty it was given to Andreas Stamatiadis, since it was his farewell match, after 18 years of service to the club. For the first and last time in his career he missed it, as the goalkeeper, denied him a final goal as a farewell.

| 25 May 1969 31 | Aris | 2–0 | AEK Athens | Thessaloniki |
| 17:30 EET (UTC+2) | Spyridon 40'; Sakellaridis 43' | | | Stadium: Aris Stadium; Attendance: 12,759; Referee: Margaritis Doumousiadis (Magnesia) |

| 1 June 1969 32 | Apollon Athens | 1–0 | AEK Athens | Rizoupoli |
| | Kyriakou 46' | | | Stadium: Rizoupoli Stadium; Attendance: 3,863; Referee: Stathis Papavasiliou (Piraeus) |

| 8 June 1969 33 | AEK Athens | 4–0 | AEL Limassol | Nea Filadelfeia |
| 17:30 EET (UTC+2) | Papaioannou 24', 46'; Nikolaidis 30', 30' | | | Stadium: AEK Stadium; Attendance: 2,162; Referee: Giannis Petrakis (Heraklion) |

| 15 June 1969 34 | OFI | 2–0 (Awarded) | AEK Athens | Heraklion |
| 17:30 EET (UTC+2) | | | | Stadium: Ergotelis Stadium; Referee: Dionysis Voulgaris (Athens) |
Note: AEK left the match at 26th minute, following the instructions of the escort, in protest against a controversial penalty awarded to OFI, while the score was 0–0. The match was awarded with 2–0 to OFI and AEK were zeroed.

=== Greek Cup ===
AEK entered the Greek Cup at the round of 32.

==== Matches ====
| 14 May 1969 Round of 32 | AEK Athens | 5–0 | Lamia | Nea Filadelfeia |
| 16:30 EET (UTC+2) | Papaioannou 6', 53', 82'; Ventouris 78'; Pomonis 80' | | | Stadium: AEK Stadium; Referee: Vougiouklakis (Piraeus) |

| 11 June 1969 Round of 16 | Panachaiki | 4–2 | AEK Athens | Patras |
| 17:00 EET (UTC+2) | Davourlis 25', 59', 79'; Michalopoulos 37' | | Ventouris 47'; Papaioannou 68' | Stadium: Panachaiki Stadium; Attendance: 15,000; Referee: Nikos Giannopoulos (Athens) |

=== European Cup ===
==== First round ====
| 18 September 1968 First leg | AEK Athens (Greece) | 3–0 | (Luxembourg) Jeunesse Esch | Athens, Greece |
| 16:30 EET (UTC+2) | Papaioannou 27'; Papageorgiou 58'; Karafeskos 60' (pen.) | Report | | Stadium: AEK Stadium; Attendance: 16,205; Referee: Fabio Monti (Italy) |

| 2 October 1968 Second leg | Jeunesse Esch (Luxembourg) | 3–2 (3–5 agg.) | (Greece) AEK Athens | Esch-sur-Alzette, Luxembourg |
| 20:30 EET (UTC+2) | Hoffmann 6'; Drouet 40'; Langer 77' | Report | Ventouris 16', 33' | Stadium: Stade de la Frontière; Attendance: 3,213; Referee: Joseph Hannet (Belgium) |

==== Second round ====
| 13 November 1968 First leg | AEK Athens (Greece) | 0–0 | (Denmark) AB | Athens, Greece |
| 15:00 EET (UTC+2) | | Report | | Stadium: AEK Stadium; Attendance: 8,161; Referee: Ferdinand Marschall (Austria) |

| 27 November 1968 Second leg | AB (Denmark) | 0–2 (0–2 agg.) | (Greece) AEK Athens | Copenhagen, Denmark |
| 20:30 EET (UTC+2) | | Report | Stamatiadis 25'; Papaioannou 81' | Stadium: Københavns Idrætspark; Attendance: 11,471; Referee: Robert Holley Davidson (Scotland) |

==== Quarter-finals ====
| 26 February 1969 First leg | Spartak Trnava (Czechoslovakia) | 2–1 | (Greece) AEK Athens | Trnava, Czechoslovakia |
| 16:30 EET (UTC+2) | Jarábek 25'; Kabát 44' | Report | Sevastopoulos 60' | Stadium: Spartak Stadium; Attendance: 10,747; Referee: Gilbert Droz (Switzerland) |

| 12 March 1969 Second leg | AEK Athens (Greece) | 1–1 (2–3 agg.) | (Czechoslovakia) Spartak Trnava | Athens, Greece |
| 16:00 EET (UTC+2) | Papaioannou 77' | Report | Švec 22' | Stadium: AEK Stadium; Attendance: 29,842; Referee: Concetto Lo Bello (Italy) |

== Statistics ==
=== Squad statistics ===
As of 15 June 1969

| No. | Pos | Player | Alpha Ethniki | | Greek Cup | | European Cup | | Total | |
| No. | Pos | Player | Apps | Goals | Apps | Goals | Apps | Goals | Apps | Goals |
Goalkeepers
| — | GK | (Kingdom of Greece) Stelios Serafidis | 3 | 0 | 0 | 0 | 0 | 0 | 3 | 0 |
| — | GK | (Kingdom of Greece) Theodoros Maniateas | 4 | 0 | 0 | 0 | 2 | 0 | 6 | 0 |
| — | GK | (Kingdom of Greece) Stelios Konstantinidis | 29 | 0 | 2 | 0 | 4 | 0 | 35 | 0 |
| — | GK | (Kingdom of Greece) Giannis Kokkinos | 0 | 0 | 0 | 0 | 0 | 0 | 0 | 0 |
Defenders
| — | DF | (Kingdom of Greece) Alekos Sofianidis | 4 | 0 | 0 | 0 | 2 | 0 | 6 | 0 |
| — | DF | (Turkey) Aleko Yordan | 6 | 0 | 0 | 0 | 2 | 0 | 8 | 0 |
| — | DF | (Kingdom of Greece) Tasos Vasiliou | 28 | 0 | 2 | 0 | 6 | 0 | 36 | 0 |
| — | DF | (Kingdom of Greece) Giorgos Kefalidis | 33 | 1 | 2 | 0 | 4 | 0 | 39 | 1 |
| — | DF | (Kingdom of Greece) Fotis Balopoulos | 27 | 0 | 2 | 0 | 4 | 0 | 33 | 0 |
| — | DF | (Kingdom of Greece) Lakis Frogoudakis | 6 | 0 | 2 | 0 | 0 | 0 | 8 | 0 |
| — | DF | (Kingdom of Greece) Giannis Spyropoulos | 1 | 0 | 0 | 0 | 0 | 0 | 1 | 0 |
| — | DF | (Kingdom of Greece) Christos Antonopoulos | 3 | 0 | 0 | 0 | 0 | 0 | 3 | 0 |
| — | DF | (Kingdom of Greece) Giannis Stavrou | 0 | 0 | 0 | 0 | 0 | 0 | 0 | 0 |
| — | DF | (Kingdom of Greece) Nikos Karapoulitidis | 3 | 0 | 0 | 0 | 0 | 0 | 3 | 0 |
Midfielders
| — | MF | (Kingdom of Greece) Stelios Skevofilakas | 32 | 4 | 2 | 0 | 6 | 0 | 40 | 4 |
| — | MF | (Kingdom of Greece) Panagiotis Ventouris | 19 | 4 | 2 | 2 | 5 | 2 | 26 | 8 |
| — | MF | (Kingdom of Greece) Nikos Stathopoulos | 30 | 0 | 1 | 0 | 6 | 0 | 37 | 0 |
| — | MF | (Kingdom of Greece) Michalis Simigdalas | 11 | 1 | 2 | 0 | 4 | 0 | 17 | 1 |
| — | MF | (Kingdom of Greece) Minas Stavridis | 1 | 0 | 1 | 0 | 0 | 0 | 2 | 0 |
| — | MF | (Kingdom of Greece) Giorgos Karafeskos | 32 | 5 | 2 | 0 | 6 | 1 | 40 | 6 |
| — | MF | (Kingdom of Greece) Giorgos Lavaridis | 11 | 1 | 0 | 0 | 0 | 0 | 11 | 1 |
Forwards
| — | FW | (Kingdom of Greece) Andreas Stamatiadis | 23 | 2 | 0 | 0 | 5 | 1 | 28 | 3 |
| — | FW | (Kingdom of Greece) Kostas Papageorgiou | 10 | 2 | 0 | 0 | 2 | 1 | 12 | 3 |
| — | FW | (Kingdom of Greece) Mimis Papaioannou | 33 | 20 | 2 | 4 | 6 | 3 | 41 | 27 |
| — | FW | (Kingdom of Greece) Spyros Pomonis | 24 | 4 | 2 | 1 | 2 | 0 | 28 | 5 |
| — | FW | (Kingdom of Greece) Nikos Exarchidis | 0 | 0 | 0 | 0 | 0 | 0 | 0 | 0 |
| — | FW | (Kingdom of Greece) Kostas Nikolaidis | 29 | 10 | 1 | 0 | 4 | 0 | 34 | 10 |
| — | FW | (Kingdom of Greece) Dimitris Kyrmizas | 2 | 0 | 1 | 0 | 0 | 0 | 3 | 0 |
| — | FW | (Kingdom of Greece) Andreas Karakidis | 5 | 0 | 0 | 0 | 0 | 0 | 5 | 0 |
Left during season
| — | FW | (Kingdom of Greece) Nikos Sevastopoulos | 19 | 4 | 0 | 0 | 5 | 1 | 24 | 5 |

=== Goalscorers ===
As of 15 June 1969
The list is sorted by competition order when total goals are equal, then by position and then alphabetically by surname.

| Rank | Pos. | Player | Alpha Ethniki | Greek Cup | European Cup | Total |
|---|---|---|---|---|---|---|
| 1 | FW | (Greece) Mimis Papaioannou | 20 | 4 | 3 | 27 |
| 2 | FW | (Greece) Kostas Nikolaidis | 10 | 0 | 0 | 10 |
| 3 | MF | (Greece) Panagiotis Ventouris | 4 | 2 | 2 | 8 |
| 4 | MF | (Greece) Giorgos Karafeskos | 5 | 0 | 1 | 6 |
| 5 | FW | (Greece) Spyros Pomonis | 4 | 1 | 0 | 5 |
| 5 | FW | (Greece) Nikos Sevastopoulos | 4 | 0 | 1 | 5 |
| 7 | MF | (Greece) Stelios Skevofilakas | 4 | 0 | 0 | 4 |
| 8 | FW | (Greece) Andreas Stamatiadis | 2 | 0 | 1 | 3 |
| 8 | FW | (Greece) Kostas Papageorgiou | 2 | 0 | 1 | 3 |
| 10 | DF | (Greece) Giorgos Kefalidis | 1 | 0 | 0 | 1 |
| 10 | MF | (Greece) Giorgos Lavaridis | 1 | 0 | 0 | 1 |
| 10 | MF | (Greece) Michalis Simigdalas | 1 | 0 | 0 | 1 |
| Own goals | | | 0 | 0 | 0 | 0 |
| Totals | | | 58 | 7 | 9 | 74 |

=== Hat-tricks ===
Numbers in superscript represent the goals that the player scored.

| Player | Against | Result | Date | Competition | Source |
|---|---|---|---|---|---|
| (Greece) Mimis Papaioannou | (Greece) Chalkida | 5–2 (H) | 3 November 1968 | Alpha Ethniki | |
| (Greece) Mimis Papaioannou | (Greece) Lamia | 5–0 (H) | 14 May 1969 | Greek Cup | |

=== Clean sheets ===
As of 15 June 1969
The list is sorted by competition order when total clean sheets are equal and then alphabetically by surname. Clean sheets in games where both goalkeepers participated are awarded to the goalkeeper who started the game. Goalkeepers with no appearances are not included.

| Rank | Player | Alpha Ethniki | Greek Cup | European Cup | Total |
|---|---|---|---|---|---|
| 1 | (Greece) Stelios Konstantinidis | 10 | 1 | 2 | 13 |
| 2 | (Greece) Theodoros Maniateas | 0 | 0 | 1 | 1 |
| 3 | (Greece) Stelios Serafidis | 0 | 0 | 0 | 0 |
| Totals | | 10 | 1 | 3 | 14 |

=== Disciplinary record ===
As of 15 June 1969

| N | P | Nat. | Name | Alpha Ethniki | | | Greek Cup | | | European Cup | | | Total | | | Notes |
| N | P | Nat. | Name | Yellow card | Second yellow card | Red card | Yellow card | Second yellow card | Red card | Yellow card | Second yellow card | Red card | Yellow card | Second yellow card | Red card | Notes |
Goalkeepers
| — | GK | (Kingdom of Greece) | Stelios Serafidis | | | 1 | | | | | | | | | 1 | |
| — | GK | (Kingdom of Greece) | Theodoros Maniateas | | | | | | | | | | | | | |
| — | GK | (Kingdom of Greece) | Stelios Konstantinidis | | | | | | | | | | | | | |
| — | GK | (Kingdom of Greece) | Giannis Kokkinos | | | | | | | | | | | | | |
Defenders
| — | DF | (Kingdom of Greece) | Alekos Sofianidis | | | | | | | | | | | | | |
| — | DF | (Turkey) | Aleko Yordan | | | | | | | | | | | | | |
| — | DF | (Kingdom of Greece) | Tasos Vasiliou | | | 1 | | | | | | | | | 1 | |
| — | DF | (Kingdom of Greece) | Giorgos Kefalidis | | | | | | | | | | | | | |
| — | DF | (Kingdom of Greece) | Fotis Balopoulos | | | | | | | | | | | | | |
| — | DF | (Kingdom of Greece) | Lakis Frogoudakis | | | | | | | | | | | | | |
| — | DF | (Kingdom of Greece) | Giannis Spyropoulos | | | | | | | | | | | | | |
| — | DF | (Kingdom of Greece) | Christos Antonopoulos | | | | | | | | | | | | | |
| — | DF | (Kingdom of Greece) | Giannis Stavrou | | | | | | | | | | | | | |
| — | DF | (Kingdom of Greece) | Nikos Karapoulitidis | | | | | | | | | | | | | |
Midfielders
| — | MF | (Kingdom of Greece) | Stelios Skevofilakas | | | | | | | | | | | | | |
| — | MF | (Kingdom of Greece) | Panagiotis Ventouris | | | | | | | | | | | | | |
| — | MF | (Kingdom of Greece) | Nikos Stathopoulos | | | | | | | | | | | | | |
| — | MF | (Kingdom of Greece) | Michalis Simigdalas | | | | | | | | | | | | | |
| — | MF | (Kingdom of Greece) | Minas Stavridis | | | | | | | | | | | | | |
| — | MF | (Kingdom of Greece) | Giorgos Karafeskos | | | | | | | | | | | | | |
| — | MF | (Kingdom of Greece) | Giorgos Lavaridis | | | | | | | | | | | | | |
Forwards
| — | FW | (Kingdom of Greece) | Andreas Stamatiadis | | | | | | | | | | | | | |
| — | FW | (Kingdom of Greece) | Kostas Papageorgiou | | | | | | | | | | | | | |
| — | FW | (Kingdom of Greece) | Mimis Papaioannou | | | | | | | | | | | | | |
| — | FW | (Kingdom of Greece) | Spyros Pomonis | | | | | | | | | | | | | |
| — | FW | (Kingdom of Greece) | Nikos Exarchidis | | | | | | | | | | | | | |
| — | FW | (Kingdom of Greece) | Kostas Nikolaidis | | | | | | | | | | | | | |
| — | FW | (Kingdom of Greece) | Dimitris Kyrmizas | | | | | | | | | | | | | |
| — | FW | (Kingdom of Greece) | Andreas Karakidis | | | | | | | | | | | | | |
Left during season
| — | FW | (Kingdom of Greece) | Nikos Sevastopoulos | | | | | | | | | | | | | |

=== Starting 11 ===
This section presents the most frequently used formation along with the players with the most starts across all competitions.

| N. | Formation | Matchday(s) |
|---|---|---|
| 42 | 4–2–4 | 1–34 |

| Nat. | Player | Pos. |
|---|---|---|
| (Greece) | Stelios Konstantinidis | GK |
| (Greece) | Tasos Vasiliou | RCB |
| (Greece) | Fotis Balopoulos | LCB |
| (Greece) | Giorgos Kefalidis | RB |
| (Greece) | Nikos Stathopoulos | LB |
| (Greece) | Giorgos Karafeskos | RCM |
| (Greece) | Stelios Skevofilakas | LCM |
| (Greece) | Andreas Stamatiadis (C) | RW |
| (Greece) | Panagiotis Ventouris | LW |
| (Greece) | Mimis Papaioannou | RCF |
| (Greece) | Kostas Nikolaidis | LCF |

Last updated: 1969-06-15
