= 1970–71 AEK Athens F.C. season =

AEK Athens
1970–71 season
- Chairman: Kosmas Chatzicharalampous
- Manager: Branko Stanković
- Stadium: AEK Stadium
- Alpha Ethniki: 1st
- Greek Cup: Semi-finals
- Inter-Cities Fairs Cup: First round
- Top goalscorer: League: Mimis Papaioannou (27); All: Mimis Papaioannou (37)
- Highest home attendance: 29,429 vs Iraklis (14 February 1971)
- Lowest home attendance: 6,713 vs Egaleo (25 October 1970)
- Average home league attendance: 19,015
- Biggest win: AEK Athens 20–0 Kipoupoli
- Biggest defeat: Twente 3–0 AEK Athens
Home colours

The 1970–71 season was the 47th season in the existence of AEK Athens F.C. and the 12th consecutive season in the top flight of Greek football. They competed in the Alpha Ethniki, the Greek Cup and the Inter-Cities Fairs Cup. The season began on 2 September 1970 and finished on 27 June 1971.

== Overview ==
This season AEK Athens showed that they were ready to claim titles and distinctions, as Branko Stanković had completed the squad rebuild he started from the previous season, thus no major signings were made.

AEK began their competitive obligations with the Inter-Cities Fairs Cup, where the draw for the first round brought them against the newly-formed Twente. Due to the unsuitability of AEK Stadium, the first leg took place at Karaiskakis Stadium. At the 7th minute, after a cross by Pahlplatz, Konstantinidis miscalculated the trajectory of the ball that passed past him and Van de Kerkhof sent it into the net. Afterwards, the Dutchmen played to keep their goalpost intact. Eventually, Twente left an important win in their hands, which gave them a big advantage for the 2nd leg. The rematch at Diekman Stadion emerged into a disaster for AEK from its beginning. At first, Konstantinidis was injured at the 30th minute and AEK had to play for the rest of the game with the 36-year-old, Serafidis. Moreover, by the end of the first half, Twente secured the qualification within 6 minutes, with 2 goals by Pahlplatz and Van de Kerkhof. Moreover, the start of the second half found the Dutchmen expanding their lead as Pahlplatz made the final 3–0 and AEK were eliminated from the competition without scoring a single goal.

In the Cup, the yellow-blacks began by overpowering their opponents, initially with a remarkable 20–0 win in the first round against the local amateur club, Kipoupoli, with a 7-goal performance by Papaemmanouil. Another double digit home win followed in the second round after a 10–0 victory over Agia Eleousa with four goals by Papaioannou. In the third round, AEK passed through Orfeas Egaleo with a 0–1 win away from home and in the following round they defeated Atromitos Piraeus by 5–0 at home. Afterwards, they eliminated Olympiakos Neon Liosion and Foivos Kremasti at home by 2–1 and 5–1 wins, respectively. At the round of 32 they were drawn against Lamia away from home and were qualified with a 1–4 win. Their next opponent was Paniliakos at home, where they got the qualification with an easy 4–0 win. In the quarter-finals they were against Olympiacos Volos at Nea Filadelfeia and again they achieved an easy win this time by 6–1 and were qualified to the semi-finals. There, they faced PAOK at Toumba Stadium and were eliminated in a dramatic 3–2 defeat.

Despite being eliminated from the other competitions, AEK played spectacular football in general, while also demonstrating a solid defensive performance concieding only 18 goals in the league. The matches that stood out this season from the league was an 8–2 win against Veria, which marked the highest scoring league victory in their history, while they also achieved another 6-goal win against Proodeftiki in a match that ended 6–0. The yellow-blacks remained undefeated for 12 games and after a brief fall in their performance in the middle of the season, finished the league with a total of only 3 defeats. Their great performance was rewarded with the conquest of the league relatively early on in the season. Even though Panionios finished second with a distance of only 5 points from the top, AEK never faced any threats in claiming the title. Mimis Papaioannou adapted perfectly under his new role close to the center and scored league 27 goals, while Kostas Nikolaidis also had a great performance scoring 15 goals. As the season was approaching to its end, the club was beginning to struggle financially. The administrative disputes and the over the top for the time demands of the players, which appeared within the club, resulted in a series of issues. Those issues would mark the start of a declining period for AEK.

== Management team ==
Position	Staff
Manager	(Socialist Federal Republic of Yugoslavia) Branko Stanković
Assistant manager	(Greece) Kostas Chatzimichail
Academy director	(Greece) Georgios Daispangos
Academy manager	(Greece) Georgios Daispangos

== Players ==
=== Squad information ===
NOTE: The players are the ones that have been announced by the AEK Athens' press release. No edits should be made unless a player arrival or exit is announced. Updated 27 June 1971, 23:59 UTC+2.

Player	Nat.	Position(s)	Date of birth (Age)	Signed	Previous club	Transfer fee	Contract until
Goalkeepers
Stelios Serafidis	(Greece)	GK	6 August 1935 (aged 35)	1953	(Greece) AEK Athens U20	—	1976
Stelios Konstantinidis	(Greece)	GK	6 June 1947 (aged 24)	1967	(Greece) AEK Athens U20	—	1976
Defenders
Giorgos Kefalidis	(Greece)	RB / CB	21 March 1941 (aged 30)	1964	(Greece) Pierikos	₯800,000	1976
Dimitris Liakouris	(Greece)	CB	1947 (aged 23–24)	1970	(Greece) AEK Athens U20	—	1972
Apostolos Toskas	(Greece)	CB	28 December 1947 (aged 23)	1969	(Greece) Trikala	₯1,500,000	1977
Nikos Karapoulitidis	(Greece)	LB / RB / CB	30 November 1948 (aged 22)	1968	(Greece) AEK Athens U20	—	1976
Stefanos Theodoridis	(Greece)	RB / LB / CB / RM / LM	19 June 1950 (aged 21)	1969	(Greece) AEK Athens U20	—	1977
Kostas Triantafyllou	(Greece)	CB / RB / LB / DM	1950 (aged 20–21)	1969	(Greece) AEK Athens U20	—	1977
Midfielders
Stelios Skevofilakas (Vice-captain)	(Greece)	LM / RM / AM / CM	6 January 1939 (aged 32)	1961	(Greece) Eleftheroupoli	Free	1976
Panagiotis Ventouris	(Greece)	LM / RM / LW / RW / ST / AM / SS	1 March 1943 (aged 28)	1965	(Greece) Fostiras	₯400,000	1976
Nikos Stathopoulos	(Greece)	LM / LB / CM	8 November 1943 (aged 27)	1966	(Greece) AEK Athens U20	—	1976
Lakis Avramidis	(Cyprus)	DM / CM / AM / CB	19 July 1945 (aged 25)	1970	(Cyprus) Olympiakos Nicosia	Free	1978
Giorgos Karafeskos	(Greece)	CM / DM / RM / RW	8 December 1946 (aged 24)	1965	(Greece) AEK Athens U20	—	1976
Giorgos Lavaridis	(Greece)	CM / DM / CB	15 October 1947 (aged 23)	1968	(Greece) AEK Athens U20	—	1976
Forwards
Andreas Papaemmanouil	(Greece)	RW / LW / RM / LM / SS / AM / CM	18 February 1939 (aged 32)	1969	(Greece) Panathinaikos	Free	1977
Mimis Papaioannou (Captain)	(Greece)	SS / ST / AM / RW	17 November 1942 (aged 28)	1962	(Greece) Veria	₯175,000	1976
Spyros Pomonis	(Greece)	LW / LM	12 February 1944 (aged 27)	1960	(Greece) AEK Athens U20	—	1976
Kostas Nikolaidis	(Greece)	RW / LW / SS / ST	10 September 1944 (aged 26)	1965	(Greece) PAO Safraboli	₯400,000	1976
Kostas Chanios	(Greece)	LW / SS	1947 (aged 23–24)	1969	(Greece) Levadiakos	₯300,000	1977
Kostas Pachnis	(Greece)	ST	1948 (aged 22–23)	1970	(Greece) Doxa Vyronas	Free	1978
Giorgos Kachris	(Greece)	RW / LW / RM / LM	1949 (aged 21–22)	1969	(Greece) Amyna Ampelokipoi	₯200,000	1977
Dimitris Palasidis	(Greece)	ST / RW / LW	1950 (aged 20–21)	1969	(Greece) Lefkada Imathias	₯150,000	1978
Panagiotis Psychogios	(Greece)	ST	23 December 1950 (aged 20)	1969	(Greece) AEK Athens U20	—	1977

== Transfers ==
=== In ===
Pos.	Player	From	Fee	Date	Contract Until	Source
DF	(Greece) Dimitris Liakouris	(Greece) AEK Athens U20	Promotion	10 November 1970	30 June 1972	
MF	(Cyprus) Lakis Avramidis	(Cyprus) Olympiakos Nicosia	Free transfer	1 October 1970	30 June 1978	
FW	(Greece) Kostas Tsiros	(Greece) Agioi Anargyroi	₯30,000	13 July 1970	30 June 1978	
FW	(Greece) Kostas Pachnis	(Greece) Doxa Vyronas	Free transfer	24 July 1970	30 June 1978	

=== Out ===
Pos.	Player	To	Fee	Date	Source
DF	(Greece) Tasos Vasiliou	(Greece) Ionikos	Contract termination	18 August 1970	
DF	(Greece) Fotis Balopoulos	(Greece) Vyzas Megara	Contract termination	21 October 1970	
DF	(Greece) Giannis Spyropoulos	Free agent	Contract termination	31 July 1970	
DF	(Greece) Giannis Stavrou	(Greece) Acharnaikos	Contract termination	6 August 1970	
MF	(Greece) Kostas Tsiros	(Greece) Agioi Anargyroi	Contract termination	21 October 1970	
MF	(Greece) Minas Stavridis	(Greece) Vyzas Megara	Contract termination	3 August 1970	
FW	(Greece) Kosmas Pesiridis	(Greece) AON Argyroupoli	Contract termination	31 July 1970	
FW	(Greece) Kostas Sarris	(Greece) Pannafpliakos	Contract termination	31 July 1970	

=== Overall transfer activity ===
Expenditure: ▼ ₯30,000

Income: ▲ ₯0

Net Total: ▼ ₯30,000

== Pre-season and friendlies ==
13 August 1970 Friendly	Florina	2–4	AEK Athens	Florina
17:00 EET (UTC+2)	Papailiou 51'; Charalampidis 62'	Report	Karafeskos 23'; Ventouris 33', 43'; Psychogios 65'	Stadium: Florina Municipal Stadium; Attendance: 3,000; Referee: Niskas

21 August 1970 Friendly	AEK Athens	11–1	Panerythraikos	Kifissia
17:00 EET (UTC+2)	Karafeskos 10', 62', 69', 76', 85'; Papaioannou 31'; Palasidis 52', 64'; Skevofilakas 74'; Ventouris 84'; Kachris 87'	Report	Maroukis 83'	Stadium: Zirineio Stadium

26 August 1970 Friendly	Neapoli Piraeus	2–4	AEK Athens	Nea Ionia
17:00 EET (UTC+2)	Kyriazis 23'; Kostoulas 69'	Report	Kachris 5'; Skevofilakas 52'; Palasidis 66', 70'	Stadium: Municipal Stadium of Nea Ionia; Referee: Rousakis

28 August 1970 Friendly	Vyzas Megara	0–4	AEK Athens	Piraeus
17:00 EET (UTC+2)		Report	Nikolaidis 34'; Papaioannou 69'; Papaemmanouil 80'; Pomonis 90'	Stadium: Karaiskakis Stadium; Referee: Misailidis (Piraeus)

6 September 1970 Friendly	Paniliakos	2–1	AEK Athens	Pyrgos
	Psimenos 31'; Nestoridis 71'	Report	Avramidis	Stadium: Pyrgos Stadium; Attendance: 4,000
Note: Kostas Nestoridis who was the manager of Paniliakos, competed against his former club and scored the winning goal with a free-kick.

8 September 1970 Friendly	Atromitos Gastouni	2–8	AEK Athens	Gastouni
	(pen.)	Report	Chamouridis; Avramidis; Palasidis (pen.); Kachris; Psychogios	Stadium: Gastouni Municipal Stadium

12 September 1970 Friendly	Ethnikos Piraeus	3–0	AEK Athens	Piraeus
20:30 EET (UTC+2)	Fotopoulos 12'; Chatziioannoglou 39'; Zervoudakis 88'	Report		Stadium: Karaiskakis Stadium; Attendance: 5,000; Referee: Vasilis Vourakis (Piraeus)

23 September 1970 Friendly	AEK Athens	2–1	Greece gendarmerie	Rizoupoli
16:15 EET (UTC+2)	Ventouris 56'; Triantafyllou 89'	Report	Zervoudakis 64'	Stadium: Rizoupoli Stadium; Attendance: 3,000; Referee: Komninakis (Athens)
Note: Stathopoulos and Kachris competed with the Greek gendarmerie against AEK.

11 October 1970 Friendly	Panathinaikos	0–1	AEK Athens	Ampelokipoi
15:30 EET (UTC+2)		Report	Nikolaidis 30'	Stadium: Leoforos Alexandras Stadium; Attendance: 4,102; Referee: Komninakis (Athens)

12 May 1971 Friendly	AEK Athens	3–1	Ikaros Athens	Nea Filadelfeia
16:00 EET (UTC+2)	Avramidis 62'; Nikolaidis 63', 80' (pen.)	Report	Kollias 64'	Stadium: AEK Stadium; Attendance: Zorzos; Referee: 611

=== OPAP Summer Championship ===
21 June 1970 1	AEK Athens	0–0	Panathinaikos	Nea Filadelfeia
17:30 EET (UTC+2)		Report		Stadium: AEK Stadium; Attendance: 2,000; Referee: Nikos Giannopoulos (Athens)

28 June 1970 2	Olympiacos	4–2	AEK Athens	Piraeus
17:30 EET (UTC+2)	Georgiadis 16'; Forakis 46'; Lavoutas 55'; Zoannos 62'	Report	Palasidis 26'; Lavaridis 90'	Stadium: Karaiskakis Stadium; Referee: Pagourtzis (Phthiotis)

5 July 1970 3	Panionios	2–3	AEK Athens	Nea Smyrni
20:30 EET (UTC+2)	Tsokanis 13'; Vlachos 35'	Report	Palasidis 46'; Kachris 62'; Sarris 85'	Stadium: Nea Smyrni Stadium; Attendance: 2,000; Referee: Papaioannou

12 July 1970 4	AEK Athens	0–2	Egaleo	Nea Ionia
17:30 EET (UTC+2)		Report	Tsiniakos 49'; Panagiotiopoulos 77'	Stadium: Municipal Stadium of Nea Ionia; Attendance: 476; Referee: Konstantinos Sfyrlas (Athens)

19 July 1970 5	AEK Athens	1–1	OFI	Nea Ionia
17:30 EET (UTC+2)	Tsakiroglou 15'	Report	Vavoulas 28'	Stadium: Municipal Stadium of Nea Ionia; Referee: Giannikakis (Piraeus)

26 July 1970 6	Panathinaikos	1–1	AEK Athens	Tavros
17:30 EET (UTC+2)	Kikinis 15' (o.g.)	Report	Bagias 25' (o.g.)	Stadium: Tavros Stadium; Referee: Mantas

2 August 1970 7	AEK Athens	2–0	Olympiacos	Nea Ionia
17:30 EET (UTC+2)	Souleles 79'; Tsakiroglou 86'	Report		Stadium: Municipal Stadium of Nea Ionia; Referee: Moniakis (Heraklion)
Note: Delikaris withdrew from the match in the half-time and since Olympiacos couldn't use any of their amateur substitutes, were left with 10 men for the rest of the match.

9 August 1970 8	AEK Athens	1–2	Panionios	Nea Ionia
17:15 EET (UTC+2)	Tsiros 89'	Report	Moraitelis 49'; T. Intzoglou 65'; Konstantelos (red card) 85'	Stadium: Municipal Stadium of Nea Ionia; Referee: Tsitsopoulos

16 August 1970 9	Egaleo	3–2	AEK Athens	Aigaleo
17:15 EET (UTC+2)	Grimmas 10'; Yordan 49'; Exomanidis 67'; Lykourinos (red card) 68'	Report	Souleles 53', 55'; Tsiros (red card) 68'	Stadium: Stavros Mavrothalassitis Stadium; Referee: Christos Karasoulas (Athens)

23 August 1970 10	OFI	5–1	AEK Athens	Heraklion
17:15 EET (UTC+2)	Lemonis 2'; Vouzounerakis 25'; Marangoudakis 31'; Mavitzis 44', 76'	Report	Tsakiroglou 85'	Stadium: Theodoros Vardinogiannis Stadium; Attendance: 3,000; Referee: Michalis Ornerakis (Chania)

== Competitions ==
=== Overall record ===
Competition	First match	Last match	Starting round	Final position	Record							
Competition	First match	Last match	Starting round	Final position	Pld	W	D	L	GF	GA	GD	Win %
Alpha Ethniki	20 September 1970	13 June 1971	Matchday 1	Winners	34	23	8	3	67	18	+49	67.65
Greek Cup	13 September 1970	26 May 1971	First round	Semi-finals	10	9	0	1	59	7	+52	90.00
Inter-Cities Fairs Cup	2 September 1971	8 September 1970	First round	First round	2	0	0	2	0	4	−4	0.00
Total					46	32	8	6	126	29	+97	69.57

Last updated: 13 June 1971
Source: Competitions

=== Alpha Ethniki ===
==== League table ====
Pos	Team	Pld	W	D	L	GF	GA	GD	Pts	Qualification or relegation
1	AEK Athens (C)	34	23	8	3	67	18	+49	88	Qualification for European Cup first round
2	Panionios	34	21	7	6	61	34	+27	83	Qualification for UEFA Cup first round
3	Panathinaikos	34	19	10	5	62	26	+36	82	
4	Egaleo	34	15	11	8	31	24	+7	75	
5	Iraklis	34	13	15	6	40	30	+10	75	

Source: RSSSF
Rules for classification: 1st points; 2nd decision match; 3rd head-to-head goal difference.
(C) Champions

==== Results summary ====
Overall								Home						Away					
Pld	W	D	L	GF	GA	GD	Pts	W	D	L	GF	GA	GD	W	D	L	GF	GA	GD
34	23	8	3	67	18	+49	88	16	1	0	48	5	+43	7	7	3	19	13	+6

Source: Competitive matches

==== Results by Matchday ====
Round	1	2	3	4	5	6	7	8	9	10	11	12	13	14	15	16	17	18	19	20	21	22	23	24	25	26	27	28	29	30	31	32	33	34
Ground	A	H	A	H	A	H	A	A	H	A	H	A	H	A	H	H	A	H	A	H	A	H	A	H	H	A	H	A	H	A	H	A	A	H
Result	D	W	W	W	W	W	W	D	W	D	W	L	D	D	W	W	W	W	D	W	D	W	W	W	W	W	W	L	W	L	W	W	D	W
Position	6	5	3	1	1	1	1	1	1	1	1	3	2	2	3	2	1	1	1	1	1	1	1	1	1	1	1	1	1	1	1	1	1	1

Source: Competitive matches
A = Away; H = Home; W = Win; D = Draw; L = Loss; P = Postponed

==== Matches ====
20 September 1970 1	Aris	1–1	AEK Athens	Thessaloniki
16:15 EET (UTC+2)	Alexiadis 81'		Papaioannou 64'	Stadium: Kaftanzoglio Stadium; Attendance: 27,786; Referee: Pan Marinos (Piraeus)
Note: Due to construction works at Aris Stadium, Aris used Kaftanzoglio as home ground.

27 September 1970 2	AEK Athens	2–0	PAOK	Nea Filadelfeia
16:15 EET (UTC+2)	Pomonis 63'; Nikolaidis 78'			Stadium: AEK Stadium; Attendance: 29,406; Referee: Stathis Papavasiliou (Piraeus)

4 October 1970 3	Iraklis	0–1	AEK Athens	Thessaloniki
15:30 EET (UTC+2)	Nikoloudis (penalty missed) 32'		Papaioannou 16'	Stadium: Kaftanzoglio Stadium; Attendance: 7,588; Referee: Lepidas

4 November 1970 4	AEK Athens	8–2	Veria	Nea Filadelfeia
15:00 EET (UTC+2)	Stathopoulos 9'; Pomonis 27'; Papaioannou 53', 59', 81'; Skevofilakas 70'; Papaemmanouil 74'; Ventouris 84'		Michailidis 14'; Papafotiou 57'	Stadium: AEK Stadium; Attendance: 11,344; Referee: Kostas Dikopoulos (Larissa)
Note: AEK Athens highest scoring victory in the league.

17 October 1970 5	EPA Larnaca	0–1	AEK Athens	Nicosia
			Nikolaidis 56'	Stadium: GSZ Stadium; Attendance: 4,242; Referee: Komninakis (Athens)

25 October 1970 6	AEK Athens	2–0	Egaleo	Nea Filadelfeia
15:30 EET (UTC+2)	Papaioannou 4', 34'		Lykourinos (red card) 54'	Stadium: AEK Stadium; Attendance: 6,713; Referee: Nikos Giannopoulos (Athens)

1 November 1970 7	Panserraikos	0–1	AEK Athens	Serres
15:00 EET (UTC+2)			Papaioannou 23'	Stadium: Serres Municipal Stadium; Attendance: 8,182; Referee: Giorgos Katsoras (Thessaloniki)

8 November 1970 8	OFI	1–1	AEK Athens	Heraklion
15:00 EET (UTC+2)	Gravias 43'		Papaioannou 43'	Stadium: Ergotelis Stadium; Attendance: 7,518; Referee: Leonidas Vamvakopoulos (Athens)

15 November 1970 9	AEK Athens	2–0	Fostiras	Nea Filadelfeia
15:00 EET (UTC+2)	Nikolaidis 24'; Pomonis 41'			Stadium: AEK Stadium; Attendance: 23,809; Referee: Martinis (Thessaloniki)

29 November 1970 10	Pierikos	0–0	AEK Athens	Katerini
14:45 EET (UTC+2)				Stadium: Katerini Stadium; Attendance: 5,456; Referee: Dionysopoulos

6 December 1970 11	AEK Athens	2–0	Olympiacos	Nea Filadelfeia
14:45 EET (UTC+2)	Pomonis 50'; Pappas 72' (o.g.)			Stadium: AEK Stadium; Attendance: 25,604; Referee: Nikos Zlatanos (Thessaloniki)

20 December 1970 12	Apollon Athens	2–1	AEK Athens	Rizoupoli
14:45 EET (UTC+2)	Papageorgiou 39', 86'		Nikolaidis 22'	Stadium: Rizoupoli Stadium; Attendance: 11,487; Referee: Eleftheriadis (Athens)

27 December 1970 13	AEK Athens	1–1	Panathinaikos	Nea Filadelfeia
14:45 EET (UTC+2)	Karafeskos 75'		Grammos 32'	Stadium: AEK Stadium; Attendance: 29,174; Referee: Stathis Papavasiliou (Piraeus)

3 January 1971 14	Kavala	0–0	AEK Athens	Kavala
15:00 EET (UTC+2)				Stadium: Kavala National Stadium; Attendance: 11,902; Referee: Pan Marinos (Piraeus)

10 January 1971 15	AEK Athens	2–1	Ethnikos Piraeus	Nea Filadelfeia
15:00 EET (UTC+2)	Nikolaidis 60'; Lavaridis 68'		Eleftheriadis 34', (red card) 60'	Stadium: AEK Stadium; Attendance: 10,272; Referee: Pyloridis

17 January 1971 16	AEK Athens	1–0	Panionios	Nea Filadelfeia
15:00 EET (UTC+2)	Papaioannou 83'			Stadium: AEK Stadium; Attendance: 25,738; Referee: Christos Michas (Athens)

23 January 1971 17	Proodeftiki	1–2	AEK Athens	Piraeus
	Glezos 70'		Kachris 66', 87'	Stadium: Karaiskakis Stadium; Attendance: 25,000; Referee: Giorgos Katsoras (Thessaloniki)

31 January 1971 18	AEK Athens	2–0	Aris	Nea Filadelfeia
15:15 EET (UTC+2)	Karafeskos 13'; Kachris 53'			Stadium: AEK Stadium; Attendance: 21,836; Referee: Andreas Kouniaidis (Cyprus)

7 February 1971 19	PAOK	0–0	AEK Athens	Thessaloniki
15:15 EET (UTC+2)				Stadium: Toumba Stadium; Attendance: 25,660; Referee: Stathis Papavasiliou (Piraeus)

14 February 1971 20	AEK Athens	2–0	Iraklis	Nea Filadelfeia
	Lavaridis 2'; Nikolaidis 10'			Stadium: AEK Stadium; Attendance: 29,429; Referee: Kostas Xanthos (Dodecanese)

21 February 1971 21	Veria	1–1	AEK Athens	Veria
15:30 EET (UTC+2)	Th. Theodoridis 69'		Nikolaidis 60'	Stadium: Veria Stadium; Attendance: 6,983; Referee: Perperidis

7 March 1971 22	AEK Athens	3–0	EPA Larnaca	Nea Filadelfeia
16:00 EET (UTC+2)	Papaioannou 47', 82', 90'		Chatzigiannakos (red card) 85'	Stadium: AEK Stadium; Attendance: 12,544; Referee: Kostas Dikopoulos (Larissa)

14 March 1971 23	Egaleo	0–2	AEK Athens	Aigaleo
16:00 EET (UTC+2)			Karafeskos 37'; Nikolaidis 87'	Stadium: Stavros Mavrothalassitis Stadium; Attendance: 15,067; Referee: Christos Kougias (Athens)

21 March 1971 24	AEK Athens	2–0	Panserraikos	Nea Filadelfeia
	Papaioannou 35'; Ventouris 90'			Stadium: AEK Stadium; Attendance: 15,440; Referee: Stathis Papavasiliou (Piraeus)

28 March 1971 25	AEK Athens	4–0	OFI	Nea Filadelfeia
16:30 EET (UTC+2)	Papaioannou 5', 35', 80', 85'		Stamatis (red card) 37'	Stadium: AEK Stadium; Attendance: 12,962; Referee: Pyloridis

26 March 1972 26	Fostiras	0–2	AEK Athens	Tavros
16:30 EET (UTC+2)			Papaioannou 11'; Nikolaidis 41' (pen.)	Stadium: Tavros Stadium; Attendance: 8,749; Referee: Giorgos Katsoras (Thessaloniki)

11 April 1971 27	AEK Athens	3–1	Pierikos	Nea Filadelfeia
16:30 EET (UTC+2)	Nikolaidis 13'; Papaioannou 29', 68'		Foulidis 82'	Stadium: AEK Stadium; Attendance: 18,768; Referee: Martinis (Thessaloniki)

25 April 1971 28	Olympiacos	2–0	AEK Athens	Piraeus
17:00 EET (UTC+2)	Gaitatzis (red card) 37'; Gioutsos (penalty missed) 39'; Papadopoulos 47', 59'		Toskas (red card) 37'	Stadium: Karaiskakis Stadium; Attendance: 37,000; Referee: Giorgos Katsoras (Thessaloniki)

2 May 1971 29	AEK Athens	2–0	Apollon Athens	Nea Filadelfeia
17:00 EET (UTC+2)	Papaioannou 47', 74'			Stadium: AEK Stadium; Attendance: 18,913; Referee: Dimitris Protonotarios (Athens)

23 June 1971 30	Panathinaikos	2–1	AEK Athens	Ampelokipoi
20:30 EET (UTC+2)	Eleftherakis 15'; Domazos 58'		Nikolaidis 50'	Stadium: Leoforos Alexandras Stadium; Attendance: 25,338; Referee: Dimitris Protonotarios (Athens)
Note: It was the first match in the league's history that was conducted under light projectors.

23 May 1971 31	AEK Athens	4–0	Kavala	Nea Filadelfeia
17:30 EET (UTC+2)	Nikolaidis (penalty missed) 17', 53'; Papaioannou 57', 59'; Skevofilakas 81'			Stadium: AEK Stadium; Attendance: 11,312; Referee: Stathis Papavasiliou (Piraeus)

30 May 1971 32	Ethnikos Piraeus	1–3	AEK Athens	Piraeus
17:30 EET (UTC+2)	Kritikopoulos 29'		Papaioannou 57'; Nikolaidis 63' (pen.); Pomonis 83'	Stadium: Karaiskakis Stadium; Attendance: 26,202; Referee: Nikos Zlatanos (Thessaloniki)

27 June 1971 33	Panionios	2–2	AEK Athens	Nea Smyrni
20:30 EET (UTC+2)	Mavros 22'; Dedes 49'		Karafeskos 14'; Papaioannou 23'	Stadium: Nea Smyrni Stadium; Attendance: 10,682; Referee: Christos Kougias (Athens)
Note: Originally scheduled at 6 June, but was postponed, because that day a second division play-off match was held at the Nea Smyrni Stadium.

13 June 1971 34	AEK Athens	6–0	Proodeftiki	Nea Filadelfeia
17:30 EET (UTC+2)	Papaemmanouil 15', 76'; Karafeskos 27'; Nikolaidis 31', 88'; Stathopoulos 49'			Stadium: AEK Stadium; Attendance: 19,764; Referee: Nikos Zlatanos (Thessaloniki)

=== Greek Cup ===
==== Matches ====
13 September 1970 First round	AEK Athens	20–0	Kipoupoli	Nea Ionia
15:30 EET (UTC+2)	Skevofilakas 5', 19', 41'; Papaemmanouil 6', 9', 14' (pen.), 61', 72', 77', 89'; Papaioannou 42'; Lavaridis 50', 54', 62'; Palasidis 53'; Ventouris 57' (pen.); Theodoridis 64'; Pomonis 70', 87', 90'		Dimitropoulos (penalty missed) 85'	Stadium: Municipal Stadium of Nea Ionia; Referee: Spiliotopoulos

30 September 1970 Second round	AEK Athens	10–0	Agia Eleousa	Rizoupoli
15:30 EET (UTC+2)	Nikolaidis 10', 60'; Lavaridis 40', 88'; Papaioannou 47', 70', 75', 85'; Papaemmanouil 52'; Ventouris 63'	Report		Stadium: Rizoupoli Stadium; Referee: Karpodinis (Piraeus)

11 November 1970 Third round	Orfeas Egaleo	0–1	AEK Athens	Egaleo
14:30 EET (UTC+2)			Psychogios 13'	Stadium: Stavros Mavrothalassitis Stadium; Referee: Ourailidis

6 January 1971 Fourth round	AEK Athens	5–0	Atromitos Piraeus	Nea Filadelfeia
14:30 EET (UTC+2)	Pomonis 13', 78'; Nikolaidis 36' (pen.), 45+3'; Papaioannou 90'		Chatzichristos (red card) 37'	Stadium: AEK Stadium; Referee: Kostas Levogiannis (Athens)

20 January 1971 Fifth round	AEK Athens	2–1	Olympiakos Neon Liosion	Nea Filadelfeia
	Papaioannou 39'; Papaemmanouil 75'		Skafidas 57'	Stadium: AEK Stadium; Referee: Geroukalis (Athens)

3 February 1971 Sixth round	AEK Athens	5–1	Phoebus Kremasti	Nea Filadelfeia
14:30 EET (UTC+2)	Kachris 5', 30'; Karafeskos 62', 85'; Stathopoulos 82'		Psarras 25'	Stadium: AEK Stadium; Referee: Stathis Papavasiliou (Piraeus)

28 February 1971 Round of 32	Lamia	1–4	AEK Athens	Lamia
15:00 EET (UTC+2)	Trachanas 18'		Karafeskos 35'; Ventouris 73'; Papaioannou 75'; Papaemmanouil 77' (pen.)	Stadium: Lamia Municipal Stadium; Referee: Dionysopoulos

31 March 1971 Round of 16	AEK Athens	4–0	Paniliakos	Nea Filadelfeia
16:00 EET (UTC+2)	Karafeskos 9'; Nikolaidis 15'; Papaemmanouil 42'; Stathopoulos 81'		Tsitsaras (penalty missed) 90'	Stadium: AEK Stadium; Referee: Pagourtzis (Phthiotis)

5 May 1971 Quarter-finals	AEK Athens	6–1	Olympiacos Volos	Nea Filadelfeia
16:30 EET (UTC+2)	Papaemmanouil 17'; Nikolaidis 29' (pen.), 90'; Ventouris 42'; Papaioannou 50', 59'		Rigoulias 67' (pen.)	Stadium: AEK Stadium; Referee: Michalis Kyriakidis (Cyprus)

26 May 1971 Semi-finals	PAOK	3–2	AEK Athens	Thessaloniki
17:00 EET (UTC+2)	Aslanidis 40', 61'; Paridis 43'		Nikolaidis 28'; Papaemmanouil 47'	Stadium: Toumba Stadium; Attendance: 28,815; Referee: Christos Michas (Athens)

=== Inter-Cities Fairs Cup ===
==== First round ====
2 September 1971 First leg	AEK Athens (Greece)	0–1	(Netherlands) Twente	Piraeus, Greece
17:30 EET (UTC+2)		Report	R. van de Kerkhof 12'	Stadium: Karaiskakis Stadium; Attendance: 26,124; Referee: Josip Strmečki (Yugoslavia)
Note: The match was held at Karaiskakis Stadium, since the pitch of AEK Stadium was not suitable to host matches and Olympiacos did not have any European obligations at the time.

8 September 1970 Second leg	Twente (Netherlands)	3–0 (4–0 agg.)	(Greece) AEK Athens	Enschede, Netherlands
21:00 EET (UTC+2)	Pahlplatz 37', 50'; R. van de Kerkhof 43'	Report		Stadium: Diekman Stadion; Attendance: 16,000; Referee: Ken Burns (England)

== Statistics ==
=== Squad statistics ===
As of 27 June 1971

No.	Pos	Player	Alpha Ethniki		Greek Cup		Inter-Cities Fairs Cup		Total	
No.	Pos	Player	Apps	Goals	Apps	Goals	Apps	Goals	Apps	Goals
Goalkeepers
—	GK	(Greece) Stelios Serafidis	2	0	3	0	1	0	6	0
—	GK	(Greece) Stelios Konstantinidis	34	0	8	0	2	0	44	0
Defenders
—	DF	(Greece) Giorgos Kefalidis	26	0	7	0	2	0	35	0
—	DF	(Greece) Dimitris Liakouris	5	0	3	0	0	0	8	0
—	DF	(Greece) Apostolos Toskas	32	0	7	0	2	0	41	0
—	DF	(Greece) Nikos Karapoulitidis	2	0	4	0	1	0	7	0
—	DF	(Greece) Stefanos Theodoridis	30	0	7	1	1	0	38	1
—	DF	(Greece) Kostas Triantafyllou	25	0	8	0	2	0	35	0
Midfielders
—	MF	(Greece) Stelios Skevofilakas	26	2	8	3	2	0	36	5
—	MF	(Greece) Panagiotis Ventouris	21	2	9	4	2	0	32	6
—	MF	(Greece) Nikos Stathopoulos	30	2	8	2	2	0	40	4
—	MF	(Cyprus) Lakis Avramidis	0	0	0	0	0	0	0	0
—	MF	(Greece) Giorgos Karafeskos	25	5	6	4	0	0	31	9
—	MF	(Greece) Giorgos Lavaridis	32	2	7	5	2	0	41	7
Forwards
—	FW	(Greece) Andreas Papaemmanouil	29	3	9	13	1	0	39	16
—	FW	(Greece) Mimis Papaioannou	34	27	8	10	2	0	44	37
—	FW	(Greece) Spyros Pomonis	25	5	7	5	2	0	34	10
—	FW	(Greece) Kostas Nikolaidis	34	15	8	8	2	0	44	23
—	FW	(Greece) Kostas Chanios	4	0	4	0	0	0	8	0
—	FW	(Greece) Giorgos Kachris	13	3	4	2	0	0	17	5
—	FW	(Greece) Dimitris Palasidis	2	0	2	1	0	0	4	1
—	FW	(Greece) Panagiotis Psychogios	4	0	3	1	0	0	7	1
—	FW	(Greece) Kostas Pachnis	0	0	0	0	0	0	0	0

=== Goalscorers ===
As of 27 June 1971
The list is sorted by competition order when total goals are equal, then by position and then alphabetically by surname.

Rank	Pos.	Player	Alpha Ethniki	Greek Cup	Inter-Cities Fairs Cup	Total
1	FW	(Greece) Mimis Papaioannou	27	10	0	37
2	FW	(Greece) Kostas Nikolaidis	15	8	0	23
3	FW	(Greece) Andreas Papaemmanouil	3	13	0	16
4	FW	(Greece) Spyros Pomonis	5	5	0	10
5	MF	(Greece) Giorgos Karafeskos	5	4	0	9
6	MF	(Greece) Giorgos Lavaridis	2	5	0	7
7	MF	(Greece) Panagiotis Ventouris	2	4	0	6
8	FW	(Greece) Giorgos Kachris	3	2	0	5
8	MF	(Greece) Stelios Skevofilakas	2	3	0	5
10	MF	(Greece) Nikos Stathopoulos	2	2	0	4
11	DF	(Greece) Stefanos Theodoridis	0	1	0	1
11	FW	(Greece) Dimitris Palasidis	0	1	0	1
11	FW	(Greece) Panagiotis Psychogios	0	1	0	1
Own goals			1	0	0	1
Totals			67	59	0	126

=== Hat-tricks ===
Numbers in superscript represent the goals that the player scored.

Player	Against	Result	Date	Competition	Source
(Greece) Stelios Skevofilakas	(Greece) Kipoupoli	20–0 (H)	13 September 1970	Greek Cup	
(Greece) Andreas Papaemmanouil^{7}	(Greece) Kipoupoli	20–0 (H)	13 September 1970	Greek Cup	
(Greece) Giorgos Lavaridis	(Greece) Kipoupoli	20–0 (H)	13 September 1970	Greek Cup	
(Greece) Spyros Pomonis	(Greece) Kipoupoli	20–0 (H)	13 September 1970	Greek Cup	
(Greece) Mimis Papaioannou^{4}	(Greece) Agia Eleousa	10–0 (H)	30 September 1970	Greek Cup	
(Greece) Mimis Papaioannou	(Greece) Veria	8–2 (H)	4 November 1970	Alpha Ethniki	
(Greece) Mimis Papaioannou	(Cyprus) EPA Larnaca	3–0 (H)	7 March 1971	Alpha Ethniki	
(Greece) Mimis Papaioannou^{4}	(Greece) OFI	4–0 (H)	28 March 1971	Alpha Ethniki	

=== Clean sheets ===
As of 27 June 1971
The list is sorted by competition order when total clean sheets are equal and then alphabetically by surname. Clean sheets in games where both goalkeepers participated are awarded to the goalkeeper who started the game. Goalkeepers with no appearances are not included.

Rank	Player	Alpha Ethniki	Greek Cup	Inter-Cities Fairs Cup	Total
1	(Greece) Stelios Konstantinidis	21	3	0	24
2	(Greece) Stelios Serafidis	0	2	0	2
Totals		21	5	0	26

=== Disciplinary record ===
As of 27 June 1971

N	P	Nat.	Name	Alpha Ethniki			Greek Cup			Inter-Cities Fairs Cup			Total			Notes
N	P	Nat.	Name	Yellow card	Second yellow card	Red card	Yellow card	Second yellow card	Red card	Yellow card	Second yellow card	Red card	Yellow card	Second yellow card	Red card	Notes
Goalkeepers
—	GK	(Greece)	Stelios Serafidis													
—	GK	(Greece)	Stelios Konstantinidis													
Defenders
—	DF	(Greece)	Giorgos Kefalidis													
—	DF	(Greece)	Dimitris Liakouris													
—	DF	(Greece)	Apostolos Toskas			1									1	
—	DF	(Greece)	Nikos Karapoulitidis													
—	DF	(Greece)	Stefanos Theodoridis													
—	DF	(Greece)	Kostas Triantafyllou													
Midfielders
—	MF	(Greece)	Stelios Skevofilakas													
—	MF	(Greece)	Panagiotis Ventouris													
—	MF	(Greece)	Nikos Stathopoulos													
—	MF	(Cyprus)	Lakis Avramidis													
—	MF	(Greece)	Giorgos Karafeskos													
—	MF	(Greece)	Giorgos Lavaridis													
Forwards
—	FW	(Greece)	Andreas Papaemmanouil													
—	FW	(Greece)	Mimis Papaioannou													
—	FW	(Greece)	Spyros Pomonis													
—	FW	(Greece)	Kostas Nikolaidis													
—	FW	(Greece)	Kostas Chanios													
—	FW	(Greece)	Giorgos Kachris													
—	FW	(Greece)	Dimitris Palasidis													
—	FW	(Greece)	Panagiotis Psychogios													
—	FW	(Greece)	Kostas Pachnis													

=== Starting 11 ===
This section presents the most frequently used formation along with the players with the most starts across all competitions.

N.	Formation	Matchday(s)
46	4–2–4	1–34

Nat.	Player	Pos.
(Greece)	Stelios Konstantinidis	GK
(Greece)	Apostolos Toskas	RCB
(Greece)	Kostas Triantafyllou	LCB
(Greece)	Giorgos Kefalidis	RB
(Greece)	Stefanos Theodoridis	LB
(Greece)	Giorgos Karafeskos	RCM
(Greece)	Giorgos Lavaridis	LCM
(Greece)	Andreas Papaemmanouil	RW
(Greece)	Spyros Pomonis	LW
(Greece)	Mimis Papaioannou (C)	RCF
(Greece)	Kostas Nikolaidis	LCF

Last updated: 1971-06-27

== Awards ==
Player	Pos.	Award	Source
(Greece) Andreas Papaemmanouil	FW	Greek Cup Top Scorer	
