= Georgios Daispangos =

Greek footballer and manager (1910–1987)

- Daispangos with AEK Athens.

Personal information
- Full name: Georgios Daispangos
- Date of birth: 1910
- Place of birth: Constantinople, Ottoman Empire
- Date of death: 26 July 1987 (aged 76–77)
- Place of death: Athens, Greece
- Position: Defender

Senior career*
Years	Team	Apps	(Gls)
1929–1935	AEK Athens		

Managerial career
- 1936–1948: AEK Athens Academy
- 1948–1949: A.O. Kifisia
- 1949–1951: Daphni Athens
- 1951–1953: Apollon Athens
- 1953–1954: AEK Athens
- 1953–1955: AEK Athens Academy
- 1955: AEK Athens (assistant)
- 1955–1956: Chalandri
- 1956–1957: Athinaikos
- 1958: Kadmos Thivon
- 1958–1959: Atromitos
- 1959: Panargiakos
- 1960–1961: Atromitos
- 1961–1973: AEK Athens Academy
- * Club domestic league appearances and goals

Georgios Daispangos (Greek: Γεώργιος Δαϊσπάγγος ή Νταϊσπάγγος; 1910 – 27 July 1986) was a Greek footballer who played as a defender for AEK Athens in the 1930s. Throughout different periods of the 1940s, 1950s and 1960s, he served as the manager of the senior team as well as in the departments of the academy of AEK. He was one of the pioneers of Greek football and one of the "Patriarchs" of the club. He was renowned for his huge service to AEK Athens.

== Club career ==
=== Early years ===
Daispangos was born in 1910 in Constantinople and in 1922 during the events of the Greco-Turkish War he moved to Athens and settled in Psyri, where he lived with his uncle. In 1924, while traveling to Nea Filadelfeia for work, he witnessed the discussions that led to the foundation of AEK Athens, a club founded by refugees from Constantinople. In 1925, he moved to Gouva and later to Piraeus, where he lived until early 1928, while continuing to attend all of the activities of the newly formed club.

=== AEK Athens ===
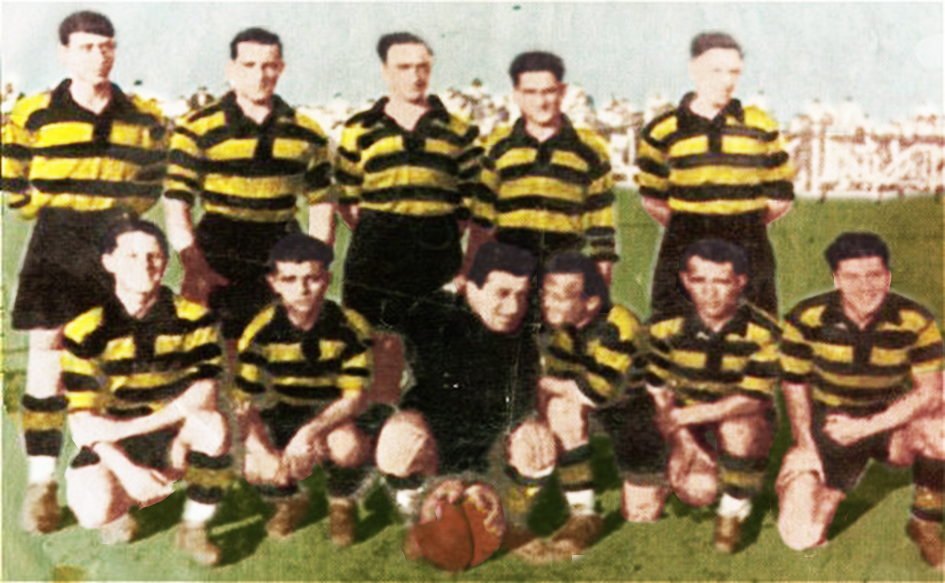
AEK at 1931 Cup.

In 1929 Daispangos joined AEK Athens at the urging of their manager, József Schweng and played alongside prominent figures of the era, such as Kostas Negrepontis, Stavros Emmanouilidis, Robert Mallios Galić and Themos Asderis. On 8 November 1931, AEK won their first trophy, defeating Aris by 5–3 at Leoforos Alexandras Stadium in the first-ever Greek Cup final, with Daispangos being among the key players of the match alongside Giamalis, Negrepontis and Baltas, who scored a brace. In parallel with football, he worked in his family tailor shop in Piraeus and in fact, was a gifted craftsman and a tailor, until 1929, as he was offered a job at ULEN (the later EYDAP) through AEK, in order to have more free time to devote to football. Simultaneously with his job at ULEN, Daispangos also worked at AEK, helping wherever he was asked to. He served the club in various roles, including those of the caretaker, masseur and kit manager. He described this period as one of the happiest of his life, stating that he felt closely bonded to the club. He retired as a footballer at the age of 25.

== Managerial career ==
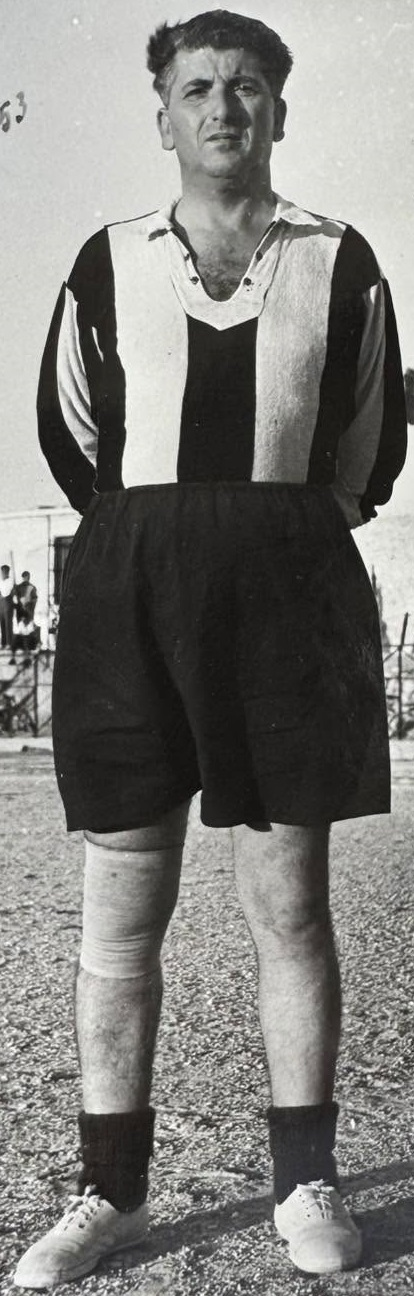
Daispangos as manager of AEK in 1953

In 1934 Daispangos organized the academy of AEK Athens, the first youth team in Greece that produced prominent figures of their later history, such as Kleanthis Maropoulos, Michalis Delavinias and Tryfon Tzanetis. He experienced the first successful era of AEK Athens, before the Axis occupation of Greece that destroyed everything, including the domestic football. He collected the belongings of AEK and kept the club's property in his house at Piraeus, before they moved to the house of Rangavis in Kapnikarea square. He lost touch with AEK during that period, but he remained involved in football, coaching Koukouvaounes, until end of the World War II and the liberation of Greece, when AEK invited him back to the club. He undertook the task of reorganizing the club's academy from the beginning.

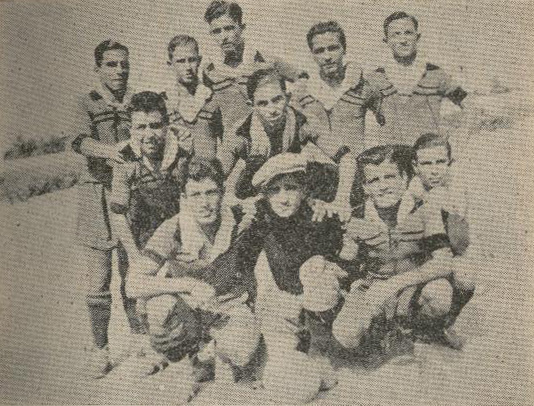
AEK's first youth team in 1934.

Simultaneously to his return and the organization of the club's academy, Daispangos practically acted as the manager of all the divisions of the club. In 1948, when Jack Beby was appointed as the new manager of AEK, he received a young team from Daispangos, with footballers such as Emmanouilidis, Parayios, Oikonomou, Sevastiadis, Darakis, Papatheodorou and Poulis, where most of them were already international. Most of the prominent figures of the later history of AEK were products of his work. On his side throughout his career were the curator, Nikos Goumas and the vice-president of AEK, Konstantinos Skouras. During 1948 the first rupture in his relations with AEK was created. He was fired and he took charge at A.O. Kifisia. He later worked at Daphni Athens and in 1951 he became the manager of Apollon Athens.

On 30 July 1953, AEK decided to remove Mario Magnozzi from the bench of the club and hire Daispangos in his place. He once more undertook all the divisions of the club, with special emphasis on the academy. In 1955 after the hiring of Ted Crawford as the manager, he remained at the club as a duo with the Englishman until the end of the season, when they both departed. During that period he produced players such as Vernezis, Melissis, Alafogiannis, Adamantidis and the Argyropoulos brothers.

He later worked for 6 years in clubs, such as Chalandri, Athinaikos, Atromitos, Panargiakos and in 1960 he returned to Atromitos.

A year later, in 1961, Goumas and Skouras returned to the administration of AEK and Daispangos was called to return to the club, rejecting the proposals of PAOK and Aris. Daispangos came back to AEK on the condition that he would work alongside the manager Tzanetis, asking Goumas to take charge of the academy again, as he considered them to be the main weakness of the club. Thus, Goumas assigned him the charge of all departments of the club. In his third and final spell, he brought out footballers, such as Karafeskos, Stathopoulos, Simigdalas, Sevastopoulos, Pomonis, Kagianas, Andrikoulas, Kritikos, Lavaridis, Maniateas, Karapoulitidis, Sarris, Kyrmizas, Karakidis, Stefanou, Thivaios, Triantafyllou, Liakouris, Istorios, Psychogyios, Theodoridis, Moschakis, Papaioannou, Giannopoulos, Karoulias, Stefanos and Christos Karypidis, Papagiannis and Kontopoulos.

In his 19-year presence on their academy, AEK wοn 18 titles in total:

- Undefeated champions of Athens and FCA Golden Medal with the youth team in 1946–47
- Undefeated champions of Athens with the youth team in 1948–49
- Champions of Athens with the reserve team in 1953–54
- Undefeated champions of Athens with the youth team in 1953–54
- Champions of the South Group and undefeated champions of Greece with the youth team in 1963–64
- Champions of the South Group and champions of Greece with the youth team in 1964–65
- Champions of the South Group and champions of Greece with the reserve team in 1964–65
- Champions of the South Group and champions of Greece with the reserve team in 1965–66
- Champions of the South Group and undefeated champions of Greece with the reserve team in 1966–67
- Champions of the South Group and undefeated champions of Greece with the youth team in 1967–68

Daispangos was one of the founding members of the Hellenic Managers Association, which served for more than a decade as their General Secretary. He had also been in the senior team manager of AEK Athens occasionally, after the 1940s and the 1950s. In 1967, he also sat on the bench of the club in the away games of the Balkans Cup against Vardar, Farul Constanța and Olimpija, since the manager, Jenő Csaknády could not enter the Eastern states. AEK left undefeated from all 3 matches with equal number of draws. In 1971, Daispangos retired from football after a 42-year presence on and off the pitch.

== Personal life ==
His son, Alekos, was also a footbeller for AEK Athens from 1960 until 1962.

Daispangos died on 26 July 1987 at the age of 77. His funeral took place at the cemetery of Kokkinos Milos, with the presence of officials from all the football community of Greece.

== Honours ==
AEK Athens

- Greek Cup: 1931–32
