= Spyros Pomonis =

Greek footballer and manager (1944–2020)

- Spyros Pomonis with AEK Athens

Personal information
- Full name: Spyridon Pomonis
- Date of birth: 14 February 1944
- Place of birth: Nea Filadelfeia, Athens, Greece
- Date of death: 28 July 2020 (aged 76)
- Place of death: Nea Filadelfeia, Athens, Greece
- Height: 1.80 m (5 ft 11 in)
- Position: Forward

Youth career
- 1959–1963: AEK Athens

Senior career*
Years	Team	Apps	(Gls)
1960–1973	AEK Athens	202	(50)
1966	→ Alexander the Great (loan)	7	(1)
1973–1974	Ethnikos Piraeus	9	(1)
1974	Saronikos		
Total		218	(52)

International career
1962	Greece U19		
1964	Greece Olympic	1	(0)
1964–1972	Greece	4	(1)
1965	Greece military		

Managerial career
- 1986–1987: Pera Club
- 1987–1988: APS Zakynthos
- 1997–1998: Attalos
- * Club domestic league appearances and goals

Spyros Pomonis (Greek: Σπύρος Πομώνης; 14 February 1944 – 28 July 2020) was a Greek professional footballer who played as a forward and a manager.

== Club career ==
=== Early years ===
Pomonis since he was young played football with the children of his neighborhood, at the sandlot behind Rizoupoli Stadium. In 1959 the former footballer of AEK Athens, Kleanthis Maropoulos who saw him there suggested him to join their academies. Thus, the young Pomonis began his football career by joining the club's academies at the age of 15. He became a member of the youth teams of AEK that won many Championships in the early 1960s, under the director Dimitris Tragos, while playing alongside footballers such as Giorgos Karafeskos, Nikos Sevastopoulos, Stelios Konstantinidis, Giorgos Lavaridis, Stefanos Theodoridis, Lefteris Istorios, Kostas Triantafyllou, Dimitis Liakouris and Michalis Simigdalas.

=== AEK Athens ===
Pomonis was promoted to the men's team earlier than his teammates, as he impressed with his abilities. On 12 March 1961 he made his debut in a 0–0 away draw against Aris, being the youngest player to compete with the club. He was a player with great technical skills and competing in the position of the left winger, he caused the admiration of the fans by running up and down the opposing defenses. On 15 July 1966 it was decided by the General Sport's Secretary and AEK to support the Greek-based Alexander the Great by providing them with four of their footballers until the end of the season in order for the club to stay in the Victorian State League. Those footballers were Simigdalas, Nikolaidis, Pomonis and Papageorgiou. Pomonis played 7 matches and scored once and alongside his teammates at AEK he helped the club avoid relegation by finishing 10th. After the end of the season in September, they returned to AEK. On 3 December 1967 in the 1–4 away victory over Olympiacos, he continuously dribbled and ridiculed his personal opponent, Orestis Pavlidis and despite the attempts by his captain, Andreas Stamatiadis to "admonish" him during the match in order to simplify his way of playing for AEK to reach an even wider dominance instead proved ultimately fruitless. The young Pomonis eventually insisted on humiliating his opponent at all costs, scoring once, with AEK missing the opportunity for a wider victory against the red and whites and Pavlidis taking the decision that the role of referee suited him better, by retiring as a footballer.

He was one of the main players of the team that won second place in the Balkans Cup in 1967, losing only in the final by Fenerbahçe. He was also a regular in the squad that reached the quarter-finals of the European Cup in 1969. On 15 February 1970 he shined at the derby against Panathinaikos at Leoforos Alexandras Stadium, scoring the winner at the end of the first half. He achieved a hat-trick on 13 September 1970 in a Cup match against the lower-tier club Kipoupoli, where they triumphed by winning 20–0. On 15 September 1971 he scored once in a European match and opened the score at the 14th minute against Internazionale at San Siro in the 4–1 defeat for the first round of the European Cup. He had a decisive contribution to AEK winning 2 Championships and 2 Cups. On 4 February 1973, he scored for the last time in the yellow-black shirt in a league match in Kavala at home when he equalized to 1–1 five minutes before the end. He played his last game for AEK at Peristeri Stadium on 20 May 1973 in the away win against Atromitos.

=== Later career ===
In the summer of 1973, he was released from AEK and played for a season at Ethnikos Piraeus, where he ended his career as a professional footballer. In the summer of 1974 he was transferred to Saronikos as a veteran and competed in the amateur local championship of Piraeus.

== International career ==
Pomonis played with Greece U19 in the 1962 UEFA European Under-18 Championship. He also played with the Olympic team on 8 April 1964, in an impressive 4–1 home win over Great Britain for the pre-Olympic tournament ahead of the 1964 Summer Olympics.

Pomonis also had 4 caps with Greece, scoring once. On 4 March 1972 he scored his only goal at the 55th minute of a friendly match against Italy at Karaiskakis Stadium in a 2–1 win, when after a corner execution by Domazos, Antoniadis with a header laid the ball to him who scored.

== Managerial career ==
After finishing his career as a footballer, Pomonis was involved with coaching and in particular with infrastructure departments, starting at AO Pera Club. In 1987 he took over the bench of APS Zakynthos for a season. The chronic pathogenicity of Greek football and the situations that prevailed even in the youth sections of its clubs, disappointed him to an extent that he gave up any involvement in football.

== Personal life ==
Pomonis worked at the PPC, while he was playing for AEK. He was a member of the Veterans Association of AEK Athens and was consistently present at their events. He died on 28 July 2020 after long-term health problems.

== Honours ==
AEK Athens

- Alpha Ethniki: 1967–68, 1970–71
- Greek Cup: 1963–64, 1965–66
