= Jean-Pierre Hoffmann =

Luxembourgish footballer

Personal information
- Date of birth: 2 June 1947
- Date of death: 25 August 2006 (aged 59)
- Position: Midfielder

Senior career*
Years	Team	Apps	(Gls)
1968–1975	Jeunesse Esch		
1975–1976	Union Luxembourg		

International career
1971–1973	Luxembourg	10	(0)
- * Club domestic league appearances and goals

Jean-Pierre Hoffmann (2 June 1947 – 25 August 2006) was a Luxembourgish football midfielder.
