= Nikos Karapoulitidis =

Greek footballer (born 1948)

Personal information
- Full name: Nikolaos Karapoulitidis
- Date of birth: 30 November 1948 (age 77)
- Place of birth: Nea Nikomideia, Veria, Greece
- Position: Defender

Youth career
- –1966: Nea Genea Nikomideia
- 1966–1968: AEK Athens

Senior career*
Years	Team	Apps	(Gls)
1968–1973	AEK Athens	37	(0)
1973–1974	AEK Athens Reserves		
1974–	Panelefsiniakos		
- * Club domestic league appearances and goals

Nikos Karapoulitidis (Greek: Νίκος Καραπουλιτίδης; born 30 November 1948) is a Greek former professional footballer, who played as a defender.

== Club career ==
Karapoulitidis began his career at his local club, Nea Genea Nikomideia. In August 1966, his fellow Nea Nikomideia native and a prominent footballer of AEK Athens, Mimis Papaioannou brought him to Athens, where he was transferred to the academy of the club. Reportedly, Nea Genea Nikomideia would receive from AEK the amount of 100,000 drachmas for the transfer, if the footballer made appearances for the senior team.

On 27 August 1968, Karapoulitidis was promoted to the senior team alongside Giorgos Lavaridis and Andreas Karakidis under Branko Stanković. He wasn't able to establish himself as a main player of the squad. However, his ability to play in all defensive positions allowed Stanković to use him as a backup whenever there was a vacancy in the defence. During his spell at the club he won the Alpha Ethniki in 1971. In the following season, he established himself as a regular. On 2 September 1971 Karapoulitidis was a starter in the 1–0 home defeat against Twente for the first round of the Inter-Cities Fairs Cup. On 28 December, he also started in a friendly against Bayern Munich at AEK Stadium, where they won 1–0. In the following season, despite making a few appearances with the club, he competed in the first round of the UEFA Cup, starting in both legs against Salgótarján.

In the summer of 1973 Karapoulitidis was not in the plans of the new manager, Stan Anderson and thus alongside Kostas Triantafyllou, was demoted to the reserve team, where he spent a season. On 17 August 1974, he was transferred to Panelefsiniakos.

== Personal life ==
His brother, Savvas was also a footballer.

== Honours ==
AEK Athens

- Alpha Ethniki: 1970–71
