= Giannis Stavrou =

Greek footballer (born 1947)

Personal information
- Full name: Ioannis Stavrou
- Date of birth: 6 January 1947 (age 79)
- Place of birth: Athens, Greece
- Position: Defender

Youth career
- 1963–1967: AEK Athens

Senior career*
Years	Team	Apps	(Gls)
1967–1970	AEK Athens	0	(0)
1970–1971	Acharnaikos		
- * Club domestic league appearances and goals

Giannis Stavrou (Greek: Γιάννης Σταύρου; born 6 January 1947) is a Greek former footballer who played as a defender. He began his career in the youth system of AEK Athens, joining the club's first team in 1967. He remained with AEK until 1970 and subsequently moved to Acharnaikos playing for one season before retiring from football.

== Club career ==
Stavrou joined the youth system of AEK Athens in 1964 and was promoted to the senior team in the summer of 1967. He played in all defensive positions, standing out for his strength, ability in the air, close marking and defensive attentiveness. Stavrou made no official appearances for the senior team, as much of his time at AEK was spent serving his military service outside Athens, playing only in friendly matches. During his spell at the club, AEK won the championship in 1968 and were runners-up in the Balkans Cup in 1967. On 31 July 1970 he was released by the club.

On 6 August, Stavrou joined Acharnaikos, who had recently been promoted to the second division. He made his debut on 25 October in a 2–0 home win against Ergotelis in the league. After the end of the season Stavrou retired as a footballer.

== Honours ==
AEK Athens

- Alpha Ethniki: 1967–68
