= Nikos Sevastopoulos =

Greek footballer (1945–2026)

- Sevastopoulos with AEK

Personal information
- Full name: Nikolaos Sevastopoulos
- Date of birth: 26 February 1945
- Place of birth: Tavros, Athens, Greece
- Date of death: 2 October 2026 (aged 81)
- Place of death: Athens, Greece
- Positions: Forward; attacking midfielder

Youth career
- 1956–1957: Panthisaikos
- 1957–1967: AEK Athens

Senior career*
Years	Team	Apps	(Gls)
1963–1969	AEK Athens	20	(4)
1964	→ Hellenic (loan)		
1967–1968	→ Hellenic (loan)		
1969	→ Hellenic (loan)		
1969–1981	Vyzas Megara		
1974	→ Toronto Homer (loan)		
1975–1976	→ Windsor Stars (loan)	8	(0)
1976	→Toronto Metros-Croatia (loan)	3	(0)

International career
1963	Greece U19	4	(1)
- * Club domestic league appearances and goals

Nikos Sevastopoulos (Greek: Νίκος Σεβαστόπουλος; 26 February 1945 – 2 October 2026) was a Greek professional footballer who played as a forward. He was nicknamed "the Greek Pelé" (Greek: "ο Έλληνας Πελέ").

== Club career ==
=== Early career ===
Sevastopoulos became involved in football at a young age, playing football with his peers in the fields of Tavros. At the age of 11 in 1956, he joined the local Panthisaikos, where he played for a season. Afterwards, he went for a trial in the youth departments of AEK Athens under Christos Ribas and Georgios Daispangos. Both were impressed by the potential and skills of the 12-year-old Sevastopoulos and immediately enrolled him in the academy of the club. There, he was established as a main player in the youth divisions. In the summer of 1963, both the senior and youth team won the league, while Sevastopoulos was already a key player in the youth national team.

=== AEK Athens ===
Under the new manager, Heinrich Müller he was promoted to the senior team. On 13 October, he made his debut in a 0–0 away draw against Iraklis. However, later in the season, he rejected the proposal of Kleanthis Maropoulos to work as an employee in the sporting goods store he maintained alongside Tryfon Tzanetis. This resulted in the footballer being left out of favor. Maropoulos, who was the selector of the national team and General Captain of AEK, removed him from the senior team and sent him back to the youth team, which frustrated Sevastopoulos. His frustration led to provocative behaviour on the pitch. On 4 April 1964, in a match against the youth team of Ethnikos Piraeus, he was provoked by his marker, Christos Chatziioannidis. Sevastopoulos engaged in a fight and hit his opponent, which resulted in his punishment with a four-month suspension.

During this period, the president of Hellenic from Cape Town came to Greece in order to get the player of Fostiras, Giorgos Deimezis, join his club for another season. Deimezis refused and as he was looking for a replacement, he found Sevastopoulos, who was punished and could not compete in Greece. Moreover, since the professional South African League was not affiliated with FIFA, the move was permissible. On 22 April, Sevastopoulos left Greece and moved to Cape Town initially for four months, but his spell eventually lasted seven months. On 19 September, the club arranged a friendly match against Real Madrid of Ferenc Puskás, Amancio Amaro, Francisco Gento and Pirri. Despite losing 4–0, Sevastopoulos impressed the people of the Blancos, who arranged through their agent for him to visit Madrid in the following year for a trial. However, his trip to Spain never occurred, as on 9 November he returned to Greece to do his military service.

His spell in South Africa increased the spite of Maropoulos towards him, resulting in the continuation of his exclusion from the senior team of AEK throughout his military service. In April 1967, after he completed his service in the military, he returned to the senior team. The Coup d'état of 21 April and the consolidation of the military dictatorship resulted in the removal of Maropoulos as selector of the national team. Sevastopoulos once again left for South Africa, planning to settle there permanently. However, the change of the regime in Greece delayed the process of issuing a green card for his stay in South Africa and after spending several months waiting in Rhodesia and Zambia, he returned to Greece on 9 June 1968.

The manager of the yellow-blacks, Branko Stanković, was impressed by his skills and gave him a place in the squad. He quickly became part of the main squad and was one of their main players in their campaign to the quarter-finals of the European Cup. On 26 February 1969, the day he celebrated his 24th birthday he scored in the first leg of the quarter-final against Spartak Trnava at Spartak Stadium. Difficulties with the payment of players by the administration prompted another reaction from Sevastopoulos, who again sought to leave for Cape Town. The junta-appointed commissioner at the club initially withheld his passport, preventing him from leaving until April 1969. He eventually left for South Africa, where he stayed until 15 September. However, his return to Nea Filadelfeia was met with closed doors. Stanković had realized that he was dealing with an unprofessional and undisciplined footballer and despite his performances, he decided on the termination of his contract with the club.

=== Later career ===
On 24 September, Sevastopoulos signed Vyzas Megara alongside his teammates at AEK, Christos Antonopoulos and Dimitris Kyrmizas. In the summer of 1974, he moved to Canada to play for Toronto Homer, under the name "Gus Hatoupis". In 1975, he was acquired by league rivals Windsor Stars, where he appeared in eight matches. He was soon released by Windsor after the Ontario Soccer Association informed the club of an issue concerning his playing name. In 1976, he signed with Toronto Metros-Croatia of the North American Soccer League, where he had the opportunity to play alongside Eusébio and made three appearances. During his brief spell with Toronto, he was deemed ineligible to play by the Canadian Soccer Association as he was registered under his legal name, which caused a problem with the HFF, as he failed to get permission to play abroad. After Vyzas appealed to FIFA, he returned to the club of Megara, where he played until 1981 when he retired, at the age of 36.

== International career ==
Sevastopoulos played for Greece U19 four times in the qualifiers and the group stage of the European Championship in 1963. He scored his only goal in the 7–2 triumph over West Germany at home, on 13 April.

== Personal life and death ==
In 1974, Sevastopoulos started working as a bartender at the Hilton Hotel of Athens, while he was playing for Vyzas Megara. He stayed at the Hilton bar until 1997, without interruption, traveling to Canada or Brazil to compete in 5X5 or 6X6 football tournaments with famous veterans from abroad. He later worked in a cosmetics company with his wife.

Sevastopoulos died in Athens on 2 October 2026, at the age of 81.

== Honours ==
AEK Athens

- Greek Cup: 1963–64
