= Stelios Konstantinidis =

Greek footballer

Personal information
- Full name: Stylianos Konstantinidis
- Date of birth: 6 June 1947 (age 79)
- Place of birth: Athens, Greece
- Height: 1.85 m (6 ft 1 in)
- Position: Goalkeeper

Youth career
- 1963–1967: AEK Athens

Senior career*
Years	Team	Apps	(Gls)
1967–1973	AEK Athens	113	(0)
1973–1977	Atromitos	78^{[a]}	(0^{[a]})
Total		191	(0)

International career
1969–1970	Greece U21		
- * Club domestic league appearances and goals

Stelios Konstantinidis (Greek: Στέλιος Κωνσταντινίδης; born on 6 June 1947) is a Greek former professional footballer who played as a goalkeeper. His nickname was "the Wardrobe" (Greek: "Ντουλάπας"), due to his immense, at the standards of the time, physique.

== Club career ==
Konstantinidis started football in 1963, when at the age of 16, he joined the infrastructure departments of AEK Athens. When the manager of the club, Jenő Csaknády saw him play in 1967 he was impressed by his physique and on April 1st he promoted him to the senior team, where the career of the main goalkeeper, Stelios Serafidis, was approaching to its end. A ferocious goalkeeper who "filled" the area and had proverbial exits, Konstantinidis established himself permanently in the starting eleven in 1968. Under Branko Stanković, he was a key contributor to the team's course to the quarter-finals of the European Cup in 1969, where he kept his club with his performances in very crucial matches, as well in the success of 1971 and consisted an irreplaceable member of the team until 1973. He was also key member of the team that won second place in the Balkans Cup in 1967, losing only in the final by Fenerbahçe. After a fracture in his arm, on 3 October 1971 in a home match against Panachaiki, he began losing his position in the starting eleven. With AEK he won 2 Championships in his 5-year presence at the club.

The arrivals of Néstor Errea and the promising Lakis Stergioudas from 1972, as well as the transfer of Giorgos Sidiropoulos the following summer, left no room in the roster of the team, thus Konstantinidis was released from AEK in August 1973 and signed for Atromitos, where he played until 1977, where he ended his career at the age of only 30.

== Personal life ==
Konstantinidis worked at the PPC, while he was playing for AEK. He actively participates in the events of Veterans Associations of AEK Athens, where he served as their vice president, and follows the team closely.

== Notes ==
a. Only first division stats.

== Honours ==
AEK Athens

- Alpha Ethniki: 1967–68, 1970–71
