= Minas Stavridis =

Greek footballer and coach (1945–2025)

Personal information
- Date of birth: 13 April 1945
- Place of birth: Nikaia, Athens, Greece
- Date of death: 26 May 2025 (aged 80)
- Place of death: Athens, Greece
- Position: Midfielder

Senior career*
Years	Team	Apps	(Gls)
1961–1965	Aris Piraeus		
1965–1968	Ionikos		
1968–1970	AEK Athens	2	(0)
1970–1973	Vyzas Megara		
1973–1976	Ionikos		
- * Club domestic league appearances and goals

Minas Stavridis (Greek: Μηνάς Σταυρίδης; 13 April 1945 – 26 May 2025) was a Greek former professional footballer who played as midfielder and a later manager.

== Club career ==
Stavridis started football at the age of 16 at the local Aris Piraeus, where he competed in the second division. In 1965 with the merger of Aris with AE Nikaia he moved to the newly founded club, Ionikos, where he became a key member and distinguished himself. The defender of AEK Athens, Tasos Vasiliou who was also a former player of Ionikos, indicated to the administration of the club the acquisition of Stavridis. After the transfer deal between the two clubs was completed, the advisοr of Ionikos, Dasmanoglou made a last-ditch effort to scuttle the transfer by acting on behalf of Olympiacos, who were also interested in the player. Stavridis, being a supporter of AEK Athens and coming from a family who were also supporters of the club, refused any step backs and was transferred to the yellow-blacks on 31 July 1968 for a fee of 200,000 drachmas. He played there for two seasons, failing to establish himself in the squad, mainly due to a bad relationship with the manager Branko Stanković and competed mainly in friendly matches. Nevertheless, with AEK he reached the quarter-finals of the European Cup in 1969.

In the summer of 1970, Stavridis was released from AEK and moved to Vyzas Megara, where he played for 3 seasons in the second division. In the summer of 1973 he returned to Ionikos, playing for 3 seasons before his retirement as a footballer.

== Managerial career ==
After his retirement as a football player, Stavridis was involved in coaching. He served as a manager in various clubs of Piraeus, while for years he also worked at the academy of Ionikos.

== Death ==
Stavridis died on 26 May 2025.
