= Giorgos Karafeskos =

Greek footballer

Personal information
- Full name: Georgios Karafeskos
- Date of birth: 8 December 1946 (age 79)
- Place of birth: Agioi Anargyroi, Greece
- Height: 1.71 m (5 ft 7 in)
- Positions: Midfielder; right winger

Youth career
- 1959–1965: AEK Athens

Senior career*
Years	Team	Apps	(Gls)
1965–1974	AEK Athens	206	(21)
1974–1978	Kastoria	86	(6)
1978–1980	Kallithea		
Total		292	(27)

International career
1961–1965	Greece U19		
1967	Greece Military		
1968	Greece U21	1	(0)
1968–1971	Greece	8	(0)

Managerial career
- 1981: Argyroupoli
- 1982–1983: A.O. Kifisia
- 1986–1987: AEK Athens Academy
- 1988–1989: Olympos Kerkyra
- 1989–1990: Ilioupoli
- 1993–1994: Poseidon Heraklion
- 1994: Agios Ierotheos
- 1994–2006: AEK Athens Academy
- 2010: Niki Drosia
- * Club domestic league appearances and goals

Giorgos Karafeskos (Greek: Γιώργος Καραφέσκος; born 8 December 1946) is a former Greek professional footballer, who played as a midfielder, mostly for AEK Athens and a former manager. His nickname was "the Baby" (Greek: "ο Μπέμπης").

== Club career ==
Karafeskos started football from an early age, playing in the fields of his neighborhood. In 1959, at the age of 13, Karafeskos went with a friend to the stadium of AEK Athens in Nea Filadelfeia to participate in the trials for the club's academy. His friend was chosen immediately, in contrast to young Karafeskos who was rejected. The trials were also watched by the manager of the senior team, Lukas Aurednik, who noticed Karafeskos being disappointed, called him by his side and asked him to do various exercises with the ball. Aurednik recognized his potential and urged him to go to the club's office and signed him a sports card. Thus, Karafeskos joined the infrastructure departments of AEK. Two years later Karafeskos was already a member of the teen and youth national team.

On 28 November 1965, at the age of 18, he made his debut for the senior team of the AEK under Tryfon Tzanetis. He started playing as right winger, but later established himself as a central midfielder while he played several times as a defensive midfielder. Karafeskos's presence at AEK from a young age, having come through the club's youth department, earned him the nickname "Baby", which followed him throughout his career. Regardless of the position he covered, Karafeskos showed great ease in scoring as he did not leave much room for reaction to the opposing goalkeepers with his "deadly" shots. Intense personality and unruly character, he adapted his game to the requirements of each match. The managers of the other clubs often "sacrificed" two or three players to mark him, but he was able to create open spaces for his teammates, and helped organize the attack. When he had the ball he often started a course from the center of the pitch, reaching the opponent's area. His comfort to maneuver with the ball, his beautiful dribbles, but also the pressing defense he could play, were great elements for the midfield of AEK. He was one of the main of the team that won second place in the Balkans Cup in 1967, losing only in the final by Fenerbahçe. In his career at AEK, he completed 255 appearances with 30 goals in all competitions and won 2 Championships and a Cup, while he was a member of the team that played in the European Cup quarter-finals in 1969.

Karafeskos parted ways with AEK in the summer of 1974, after a misunderstanding, due to a publication that presented him as being released from the club. Despite the assurance of the president of the club, Loukas Barlos that such a reason did not occur, his idiosyncratic and developed selfishness led him to the mistake, as he publicly admitted, of leaving AEK. He then signed for Kastoria, where he played until 1978. Afterwards, Karafeskos played for Kallithea, until 1980 when he retired, at the age of 33.

== International career ==
Karafeskos also played in all divisions of the national teams and had 8 appearances with the Men's team between 1968 and 1971, while he was also a member of the military team that in 1967 won the World Military Cup in Baghdad. Decisive role in his establishment as a midfielder was a match of the youth national team against Yugoslavia, where Greece was behind the score with 0–1 and was ordered to mark the opponent's attacking midfielder. Karafeskos "locked" his opponent and contributed the most to the comeback of Greece with 2–1. On 12 October 1968 he debuted with Greece at an away match against Switzerland for the 1970 FIFA World Cup qualifiers.

== Managerial career ==
Since his retirement, Karafeskos has been involved in coaching, obtaining the diploma of the Beta Ethniki. He worked with many amateur clubs in Athens. On 7 August 1982 he took over the bench of A.O. Kifisia. In 1993 he worked in Crete and specifically in Poseidon Heraklion for a season, where he managed to win the promotion for the Gamma Ethniki. He later returned to AEK as a manager in the reserve team and remained there for 12 years doing a fine job under adverse conditions, alongside Andreas Stamatiadis. In 2010 he became the manager of Niki Drosia.

== Personal life ==
Karafeskos worked at the PPC, while he was playing for AEK. He is particularly active with the events of the Veterans Association of AEK Athens, while serving under various positions in the academies of the club. His wife, Irene has died, while he also has a daughter named Melina.

On 29 September 2020 Karafeskos donated part of his personal collection to the then under-construction History museum of AEK Athens in the Agia Sophia Stadium. He chose the specific date on purpose, as it was the 49 anniversary of AEK's 3–2 victory against Inter Milan in 1971–72 European Cup.

== Honours ==
AEK Athens

- Alpha Ethniki: 1967–68, 1970–71
- Greek Cup: 1965–66

Greece Military

- World Military Cup: 1967
