= AEK Athens F.C. Academy =

Coordinates: 38.034011°N 23.789159°E

AEK Athens Football Club Academy
- Full name: AEK Athens Football Club Academy
- Founded: 1934; 92 years ago
- Ground: Serafidio Stadium
- Capacity: 3,000
- Owner: AEK Athens Football Club
- Chairman: Antonis Iliopoulos
- General Director: Georgios Georgiadis
- Website: https://www.aekfc.gr/d/me-to-vlemma-sto-mellon-43038.htm?lang=el&path=1963533917
Home colours	Away colours	Third colours

AEK Athens F.C. Academy is the football academy system of Greek professional football club AEK Athens Football Club. AEK Athletic Club was the first Greek club to establish a youth academy, founding it back in 1934, it has been directly managed by AEK Athens Football Club since 1979, when Greek football turned professional.

== History ==
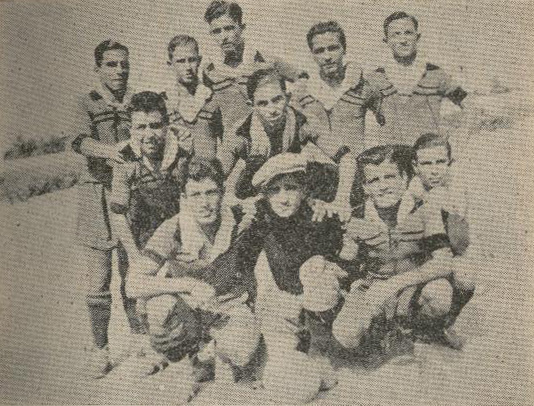
Players of AEK's youth academy in 1934

AEK Athletic Club was the first Greek club to establish a youth academy back in 1934. Under the manager Georgios Daispangos they went to become one of the most renowned academies in Greece. In the total 19-year presence in the three spells of Daispangos in all departments of the academy (1936–1948, 1953–1955, 1961–1971), they wοn 18 titles.

Famous players have been produced by AEK youth development system over the years.

Some of the most notable include: Tryfon Tzanetis (1935–1950), Kleanthis Maropoulos (1935–1952), Michalis Delavinias (1938–1954), Michalis Papatheodorou (1944–1956), Pavlos Emmanouilidis (1947–1961), Kostas Poulis (1948–1959), Antonis Parayios (1948–1957), Andreas Stamatiadis (1950–1969), Stelios Skevofilakas (1960–1973), Spyros Pomonis (1961–1973), Giorgos Karafeskos (1963–1974), Nikos Stathopoulos (1965–1974), Giorgos Lavaridis (1968–1976), Stefanos Theodoridis (1969–1978), Nikos Karoulias (1973–1976), Spyros Ikonomopoulos (1978–1994), Stelios Manolas (1978–1998), Vangelis Vlachos (1979–1985), Lysandros Georgamlis (1979–1985), Pantelis Konstantinidis (1993–1994), Dionysis Chiotis (1995–1998, 2000–2007), Sokratis Papastathopoulos (2005–2008), Savvas Gentsoglou (2006–2012), Panagiotis Tachtsidis (2007–2010), Kostas Manolas (2009–2012), Victor Klonaridis (2010–2012, 2017–2020) and Konstantinos Galanopoulos (2015–2025).

== AEK Athens U19 Squad ==
AEK Athens U19 is the youth team of AEK. They participate in the Super League U19 Championship. They play their home games at the Serafidio Stadium in Spata.

P. Players with professional contract.
As of 1 July 2026

Note: Flags indicate national team as defined under FIFA eligibility rules; some limited exceptions apply. Players may hold more than one non-FIFA nationality.

No.	Pos.	Nation	Player
—	GK	GRE	Vasilios Ioannou
—	GK	ESP	Mario Reyes
—	GK	GRE	Dimitrios Vazintaris
—	DF	GRE	Alexios Georgiou
—	DF	GRE	Filippos Theodosiou
—	DF	GRE	Athanasios Filippiadis
—	DF	GRE	Angelos Ofrydopoulos
—	DF	GRE	Vasilios Tsipourlianos
—	DF	GRE	Nikolaos Telidis
—	DF	GRE	Athanasios Rinnis
—	DF	GRE	Georgios Lamprianidis
—	DF	GRE	Panagiotis Arnaoutis
—	DF	GRE	Stavros Psyropoulos ^{[P]}
—	DF	GER	Christos Theodoridis
—	DF	GRE	Pavlos Tsaramanidis ^{[P]}
—	DF	GRE	Panagiotis Tampakoglou
—	DF	HUN	Georgios-Adrian Delaportas

No.	Pos.	Nation	Player
—	MF	GRE	Grigorios Golfinos
—	MF	SRB	Stefan Smiljanić
—	MF	BIH	Milan Skakić
—	MF	GRE	Panagiotis Marinos
—	MF	GRE	Maximos Dabizas
—	MF	BIH	Stefan Skakić
—	MF	GRE	Konstantinos Savvidis
—	MF	GRE	Sotiris Stergiaropoulos
—	MF	GRE	Panagiotis Frantzeskakis
—	MF	CYP	Giorgos Kestas
—	FW	GRE	Dimitrios Sioutas
—	FW	GRE	Anastasios Amanatidis ^{[P]}
—	FW	GRE	Nikostratos Zouridakis
—	FW	GRE	Panagiotis Pontikis
—	FW	GRE	Zois Karargyris ^{[P]}
—	FW	GRE	Ion Poriazis
—	FW	GRE	Argyris Argyriou

Staff

Position	Staff
Head coach	(Greece) Periklis Papapanagis
Assistant coach	(Greece) Antonis Salvarlis
Fitness coach	(Greece) Giannis Stimos
Goalkeeper coach	(Greece) Konstantinos Kampolis

Source: aekfc.gr

== AEK Athens U17 Squad ==
As of 1 July 2025

Note: Flags indicate national team as defined under FIFA eligibility rules; some limited exceptions apply. Players may hold more than one non-FIFA nationality.

No.	Pos.	Nation	Player
—	GK	GRE	Georgios Sarakasidis
—	GK	GRE	Orestis Loukatos
—	GK	GRE	Sarantis Moustakas
—	GK	GRE	Stergos Platsis
—	DF	GRE	Chrysostomos Diavatis
—	DF	GRE	Filippos Theodosiou
—	DF	GRE	Nikolaos Ismailos
—	DF	GRE	Vasilios Katsavos
—	DF	GRE	Georgios Lampriniadis

No.	Pos.	Nation	Player
—	DF	GRE	Leonidas Saltoriadis
—	DF	GRE	Konstantinos Terzopoulos
—	DF	GRE	Vasilios Tsipourlianos
—	DF	GRE	Thomas Chatzopoulos
—	MF	GRE	Nikolaos Adamos
—	FW	GRE	Nikolaos Karampimperis
—	FW	GRE	Konstantinos Kasidis
—	FW	GRE	Nikiforos Kolimatsis
—	FW	GRE	Stefanos Tsantilas

Staff

Position	Staff
Head coach	(Greece) Petros Kontovrakis
Assistant coach	(Brazil) Leonardo
Fitness coach	(Greece) Stelios Skyriotis
Goalkeeper coach	(Greece) Angelos Konstantopoulos

Source: aekfc.gr

== Academy Personnel ==
Position	Staff
Management	(Greece) AEK Athens Football Club
General Director	(Greece) Georgios Georgiadis
Administrative Director	(Greece) Alexandros Alexiadis
Chief Goalkeeping coach	(Greece) Konstantinos Kampolis
U19 Head coach	(Greece) Vasilios Vouzas
U17 Head coach	(Greece) Periklis Papapanagis
U16 Head coach	(Greece) Alexandros Alexiadis
U15 Head coach	(Greece) Stavros Tziortziopoulos
U14 Head coach	(Greece) Nikos Tziotzios
U13 Head coach	(Greece) Vasilios Papadimitriou
U12 Head coach	(Greece) Spyros Katsimaris
U10 Head coach	(Greece) Giannis Fatolias
Performance analyst	(Greece) Kyriakos Konstantinidis
Fitness coaches	(Greece) Angelos Konstantopoulos (Greece) Georgios Papaleontiou (Greece) Iason Psaras (Greece) Angelos Tsenoglou
Goalkeeping coaches	(Greece) Stelios Skyriotis (Greece) Giannis Karavasilis
Scouts	(Greece) Giannis Apostolakis (Greece) Dimitris Roussos (Greece) Christos Kostis (Greece) Evripidis Katsavos (Greece) Christos Vasilopoulos (Greece) Vangelis Gavrilis
Doctor	(Greece) Pindaros Kakkavas
Physiotherapists	(Greece) Lefteris Tamvakis (Greece) Nikos Kalampokas (Greece) Dionysis Engarchos
Ergophysiologist	(Greece) Athanasios Zavvos
Secretary	(Greece) Vasia Papalopoulou
Press Office	(Greece) Giannis Bilios
Caregivers	(Greece) Konstantinos Kazianis (Greece) Konstantinos Makridakis (Greece) Leonidas Chondrothanasis
House keepers	(Greece) Vaios Toursoun (Greece) Eleni Toursoun
Travel guide	(Greece) Georgios Tsoukas

Source: AEK Athens F.C.
