= Giorgos Lavaridis =

Greek footballer

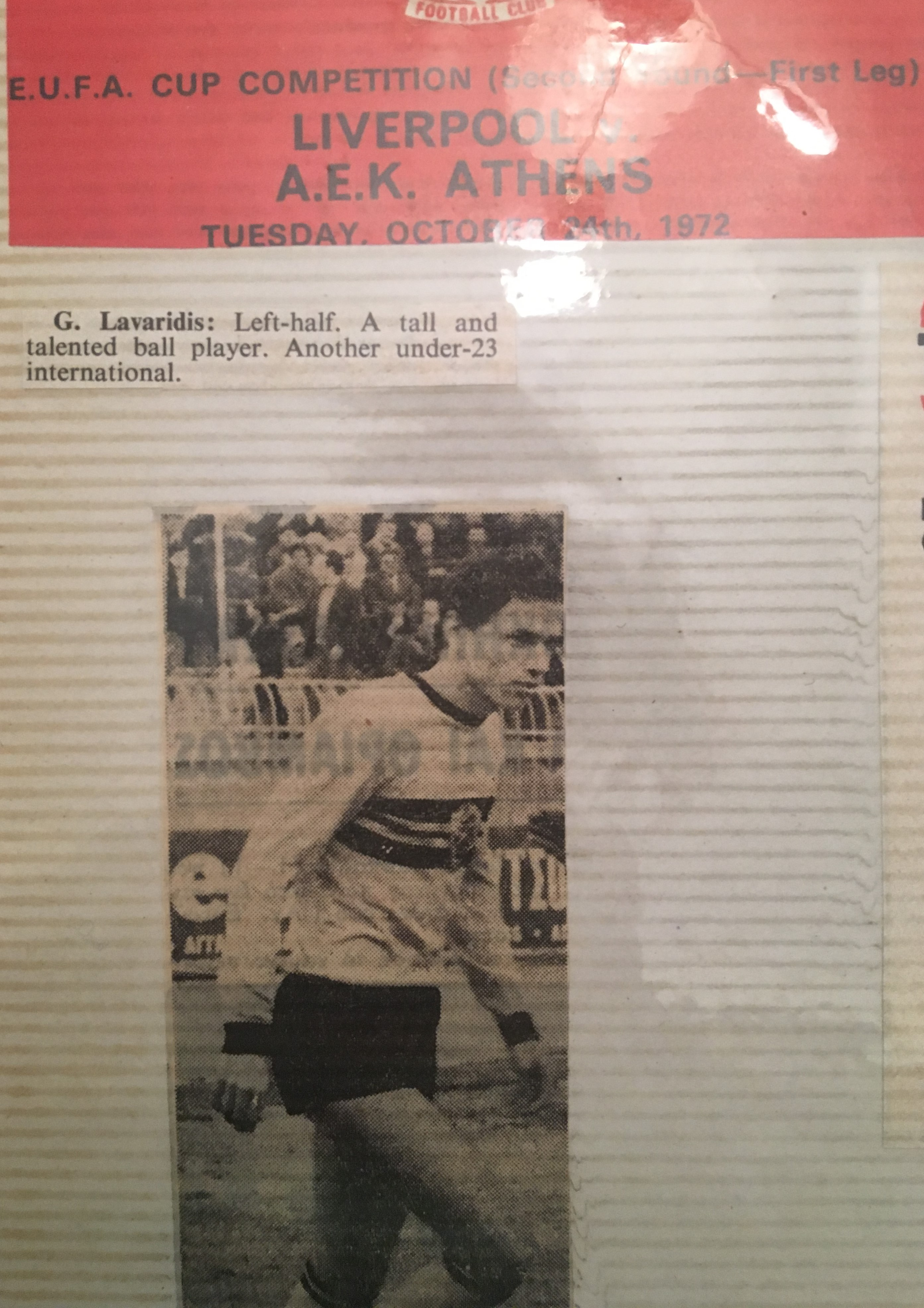

Personal information
- Full name: Georgios Lavaridis
- Date of birth: 15 October 1947 (age 79)
- Place of birth: Istanbul, Tyrkey
- Height: 1.80 m (5 ft 11 in)
- Positions: Midfielder; defender

Youth career
- 1961–1964: Galatasaray
- 1964–1968: AEK Athens

Senior career*
Years	Team	Apps	(Gls)
1968–1976	AEK Athens	133	(6)
1976–1977	Panserraikos	18	(0)
Total		151	(6)

International career
1971	Greece U21		
- * Club domestic league appearances and goals

Giorgos Lavaridis (Greek: Γιώργος Λαβαρίδης; born 15 October 1947) is a Greek former professional footballer who played as a midfielder.

== Club career ==
Lavaridis started playing football in 1961 at Galatasaray, pushed by his father, "Giakis", at the age 14. He was given the nickname "Baby" (Greek: "Μπέμπης") by the local Greeks who watched him play in Istanbul, due to his young age.

In 1964, Lavaridis moved to Greece and joined the academies of AEK Athens. On 27 August 1968 he was promoted to the senior team under Branko Stanković. In his first season at the club, he reached the quarter-finals of the European Cup. In 1971 he was one of the key players in winning the championship. In the summer of 1976 the president of the club, Loukas Barlos decided to proceed with a renewal in the roster resulting in the departure of Lavaridis. On 7 August 1976 he signed for Panserraikos, where he played for a season before retiring as a footballer.

== International career ==
Lavaridis was a member of Greece U21, where in 1971 they won the Balkan Youth Championship,

== Personal life ==
Lavaridis is married with two children. He worked at the PPC, while he was playing for AEK. He was rumored to be ordained a Greek Orthodox priest, but this was disputed.

On 19 July 2022 he visited the offices of AEK Athens accompanied by his wife and daughter and donated to their new museum his jersey from the early 70s and a photo frame with a photo of him in action from the friendly match against Nacional on 22 August 1973. On 9 June 2024 he visited Agia Sophia Stadium and the museum of AEK Athens and was photographed at the "plaque" dedicated to him outside the stadium.

== Honours ==
AEK Athens

- Alpha Ethniki: 1970–71

Greece U21

- Balkan Youth Championship: 1971
