= History of AEK Athens F.C. =

History of a Greek football club

AEK Athens F.C. are a successful and historic association football club in Greece. They have a long and distinctive history. They won their first championship in 1939 and had further success in later years.

== Origins ==
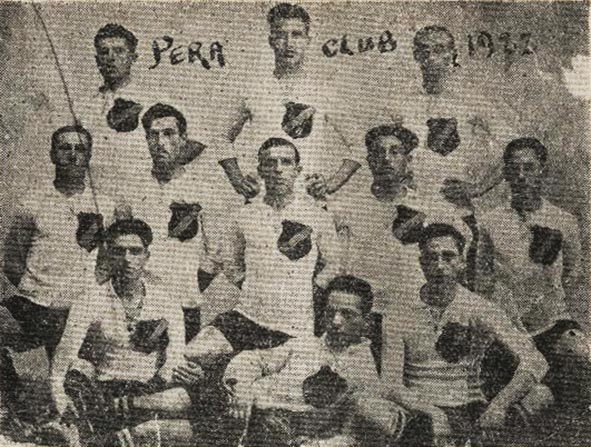
Pera Club (1922)

The large Greek population of Constantinople, like that of other Ottoman urban centres, continued its athletic traditions in the form of numerous athletic clubs. Clubs such as Énosis Tataoúlon (Ένωσις Ταταούλων) and Iraklís (Ηρακλής) from the Tatavla district, Mégas Aléxandros (Μέγας Αλέξανδρος) and Ermís (Ερμής) of Galata and Olympiás (Ολυμπιάς) of Therapia were established to promote the Hellenic athletic and cultural ideals. These were among a dozen Greek-backed clubs that dominated the sporting landscape of the city in the years preceding World War I. After the war, with the influx of mainly French and English soldiers to Constantinople, many of the city clubs participated in regular competition with teams formed by the foreign troops. Taxim, Pera and Tatavla became the scene of weekly competitions not only in football, but also in athletics, cycling, boxing and tennis.

Among the city's clubs, football was dominated by Énosis Tataoúlon and The Greek Football Team. In 1914, The Greek Football Team was formed as the football department of Ermís, a sports club established in 1875 by the Greek community of Pera (Galata). Known as "Pera" since the mid-1880s, they were forced to change their name to "Pera Sports Club" and then "Beyoğluspor Kulübü" in 1923. Many of their athletes and those of most other Greek sporting clubs fled during the Greek genocide and the population exchanges at the end of the Greco-Turkish War and settled in Athens and Thessaloniki.

== The early years (1924–1959) ==
=== Formation and first steps (1924–1929) ===
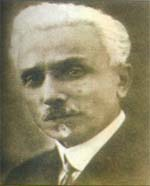
Konstantinos Spanoudis

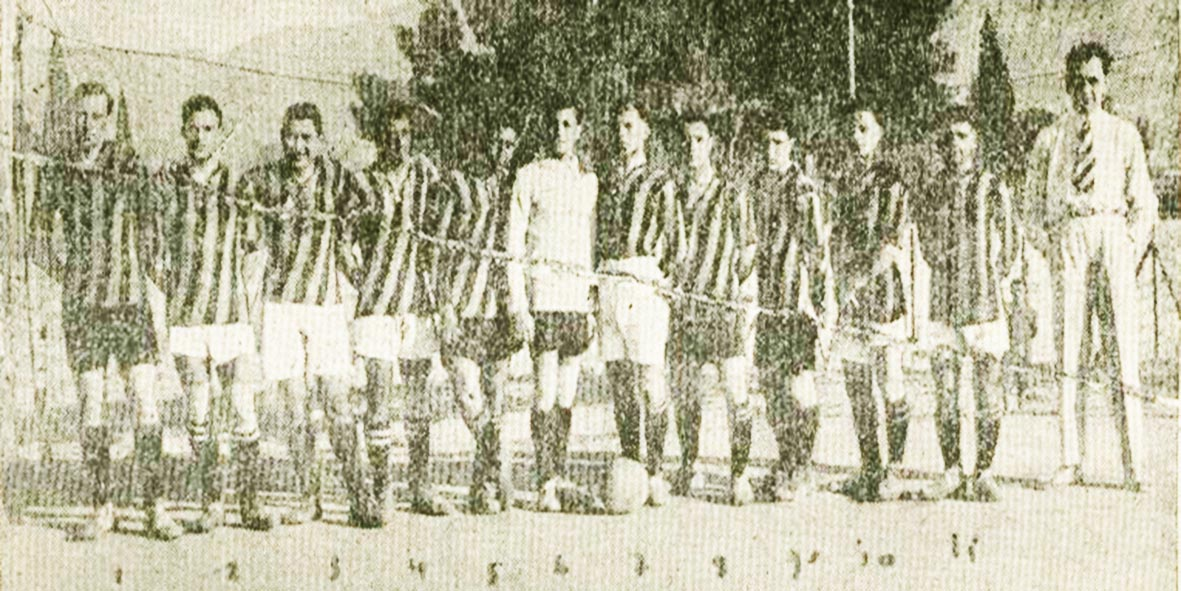
AEK's squad in 1924

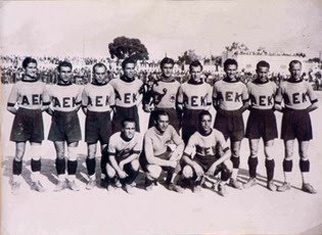
AEK's team in 1925

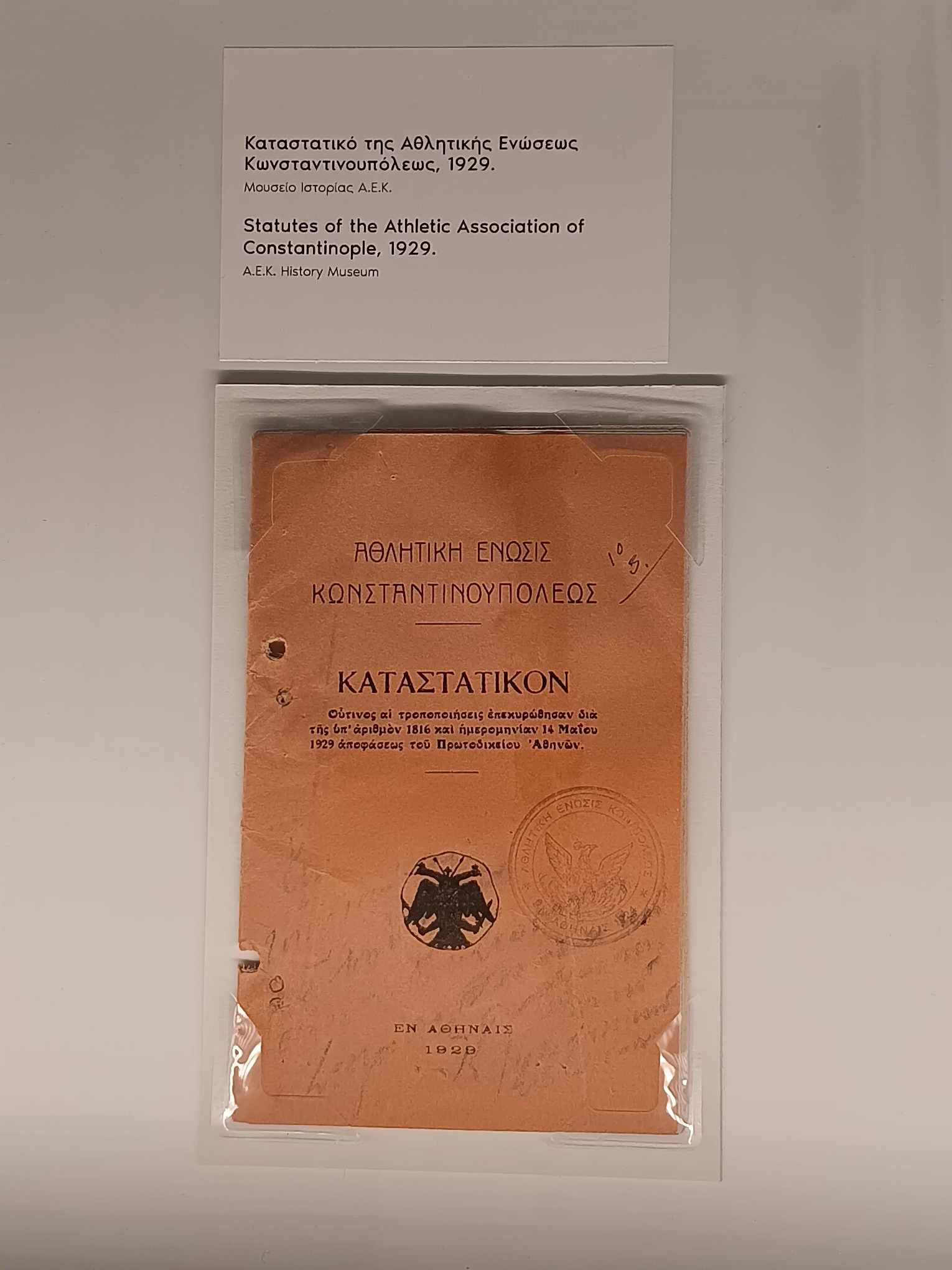
Statues of AEK in 1929

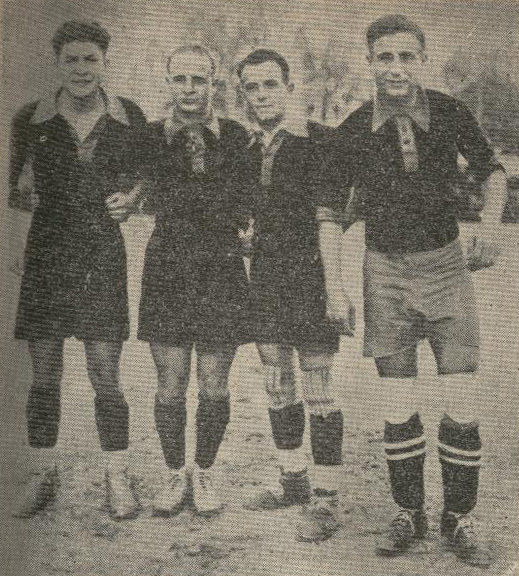
Iliaskos, Dimopoulos, Negrepontis and Emmanouilidis in 1927.

Honours won: —

Runners-up: Athens Championship: 3 (1924–25, 1926–27, 1928–29)

In 1924, the founders of AEK – a group of Constantinopolitan refugees (among them former athletes from the Pera Sports Club and the other Constantinopolitan clubs) – met at the athletic shop "Lux" of Emilios Ionas and Konstantinos Dimopoulos on Veranzerou Street in the center of Athens and founded AEK. Their intention was to create a club that provided athletic and cultural activities for the thousands of predominantly Constantinopolitan and Anatolian refugees who had settled in the new suburbs of Athens (including Nea Filadelfeia, Nea Ionia, Nea Chalkidona, Nea Smyrni).

AEK's first game was a 1–1 friendly draw against Atromitos in October 1924. Their first official match was a 4–2 win against Goudi on 14 December 1924.

AEK's football team grew rapidly in popularity during the 1920s, eclipsing the already-established Athens-based refugee clubs (Panionios, Apollon Smyrnis), thanks mainly to the large pool of immigrants who were drawn to the club and due, in no small part, to the political connections and wealth of several of the club's board members. As they did not possess a football ground, AEK played most of their early matches at various locations around Athens, including the grounds of the Temple of Olympian Zeus and the Leoforos Alexandras Stadium.

AEK's first president, Konstantinos Spanoudis (1871–1941), a journalist and associate of the then Greek Prime Minister, Eleftherios Venizelos, petitioned the government to set aside land for the establishment of a sports ground. In 1926, land in Nea Filadelfeia that was originally set aside for refugee housing was donated as a training ground for the refugees. AEK began using the ground for training (albeit unofficially) and by 1930 the property was transferred to the club.

In 1927 Panathinaikos, Olympiacos and AEK decided to break away from the Athens regional league after a dispute with the fledgling Hellenic Football Federation (EPO). They formed an alliance called P.O.K. (acronym for Podosfairikes Omades Kentrou or Panathinaikos Olympiacos Konstantinoupolis) and started organising friendly matches against each other and several continental European clubs. This also marked the start of the so-called Easter Cup. In 1928, though, the dispute ended and AEK, along with the other P.O.K. clubs, returned to the HFF.

In 1928, Venizelos approved the plans to build what was to become the club's home ground for the next 70 years, the AEK Stadium.

=== Moving to home ground and first successes (1929–1940) ===
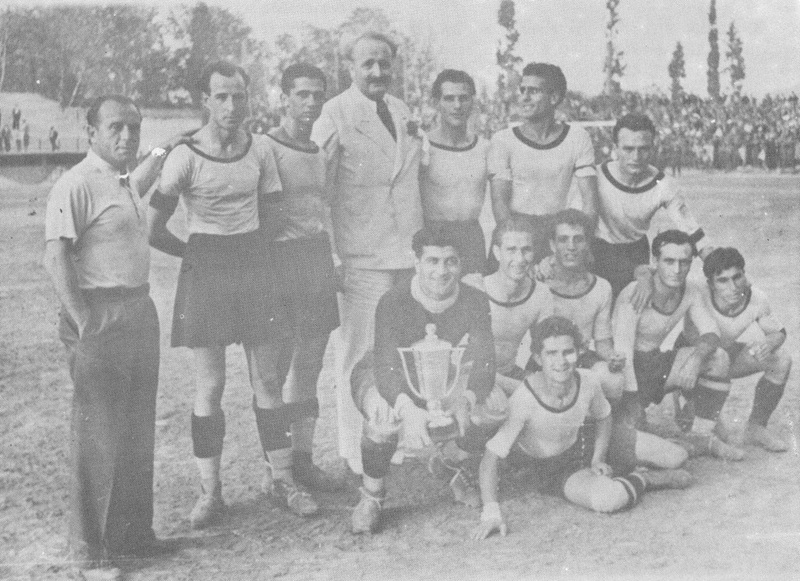
AEK Athens 1939 Cup winners

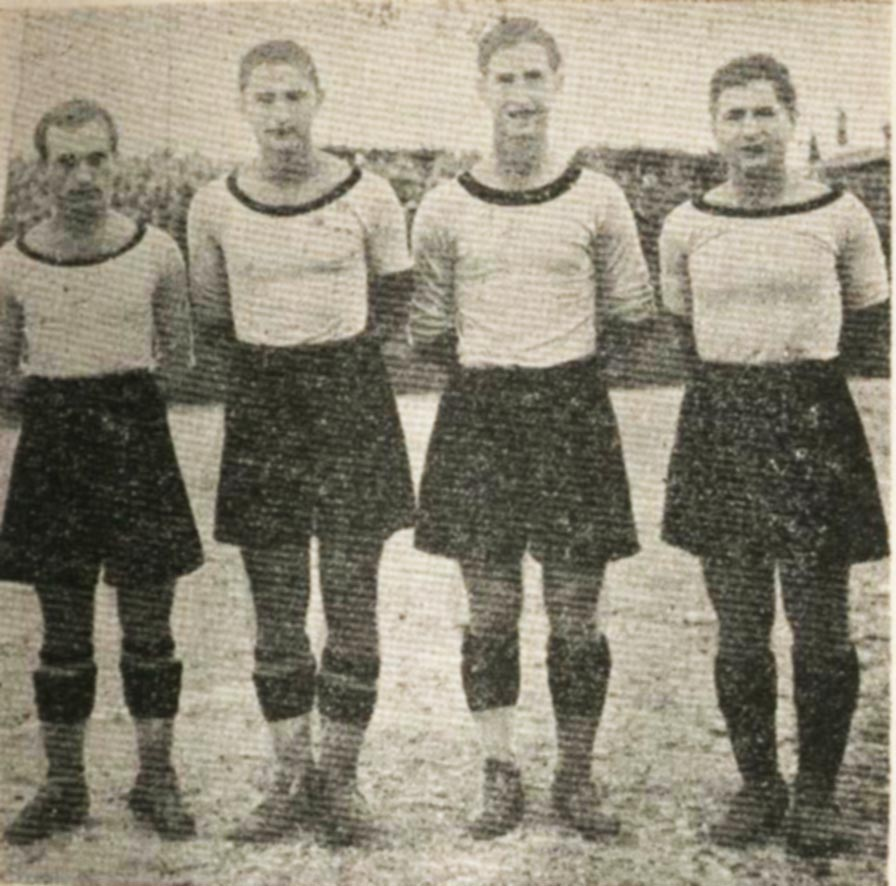
Chatzistavridis, Tzanetis, Maropoulos and Christodoulou (1939–40)

Honours won: Greek Cup: 2 (1931–32, 1938–39), Panhellenic Championship: 2 (1938–39, 1939–40), Athens Championship: 1 (1939–40)

Runners-up: Athens Championship: 5 (1929–30, 1930–31, 1936–37, 1937–38, 1938–39)

In 1930, the AEK Stadium was completed. The area where the stadium was located had previously been used as the training ground of the club. The first home game, played in November 1930, was an exhibition match against Olympiacos that ended in a 2–2 draw.

In 1932, AEK won the inaugural Greek Cup, beating Aris 5–3 in the final. The goals for AEK were scored by Ilias Iliaskos, Nikos Baltas (twice), Oikonomou (O.G.) and Kostas Negrepontis, a veteran of the original Pera Club of Constantinople. This was also the first ever title won by the club.

In 1933, former star Kostas Negrepontis became the manager of AEK. He built a formidable team which was led by Kleanthis Maropoulos and Tryfon Tzanetis, the best pair of forwards at the time and one of the best in Greek football's history. Other important players included Christos Ribas, Michalis Delavinias, Georgios Magiras and Spyros Sklavounos.

The club's success during the late 1930s was highlighted by the Panhellenic Championships in 1939 and 1940. The 2–1 win in the 1939 Cup final, with goals from Alekos Chatzistavridis and Vasilios Manettas, marked the first ever double (domestic Championship and Cup) in the history of Greek football.

=== World War II (1940–1945) ===
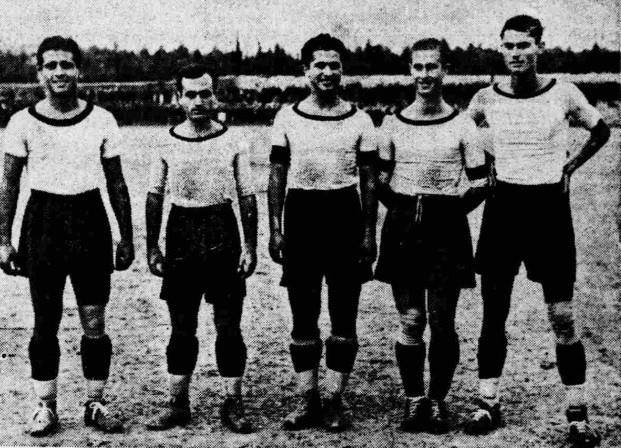
Vasiliou, Chatzistavridis, Tzanetis, Maropoulos and Kitidis before the first leg against PAOK in 1940

Honours won: —

Runners-up: —

The 1940–41 Panhellenic Championship was interrupted due to the Greco-Italian War. During the Greco-Italian War, the player of AEK Kostas Valvanis was badly injured by a mortar bomb that exploded in front of him during a battle at Pogradec. Alekos Chatzistavridis also suffered a serious leg injury during a battle in Tepelenë. After the Battle of Greece (1941) and during the Axis occupation of Greece sporting events were scarce.

During the spring of 1942 Panathinaikos and AEK organized a friendly match to raise money for a hospital but were asked to give part of the revenue to the occupation forces. The captains of both clubs, Kritikos and Maropoulos, refused and the 15,000 spectators who had gathered for the match turned it into one of the largest protests of the time. The match became known as the "Resistance Derby".

The 1942–43 Panhellenic Championship was an attempt to restart sporting activity, but it was not completed.

In June 1944 AEK player Spyros Kontoulis was killed by the Nazi forces during his attempt to escape while being transported to Kaisariani in order to be executed for his involvement in the resistance.

=== The Post-World War II years (1945–1952) ===
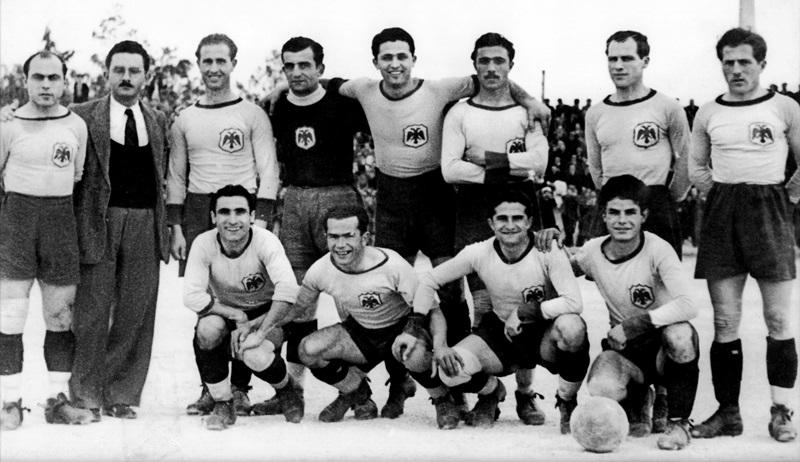
AEK Athens in 1947

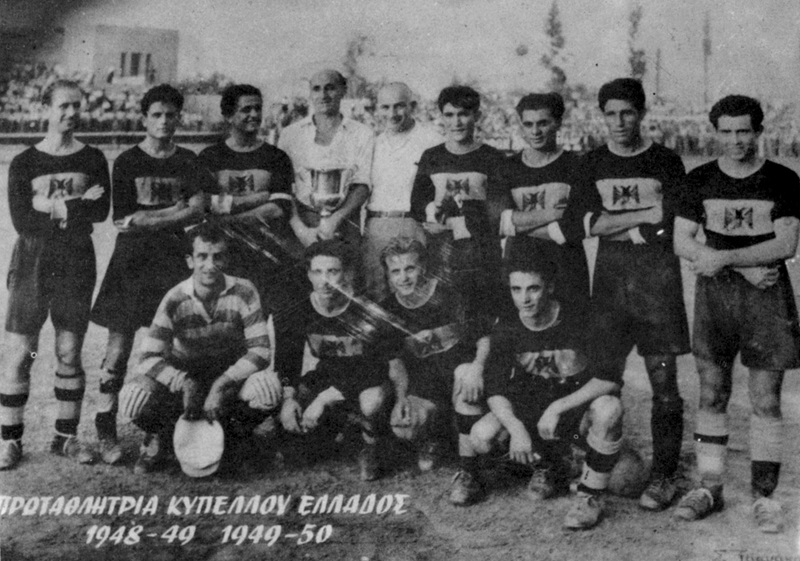
AEK Athens, 1950 Cup winners

Honours won: Athens Championship: 3 (1945–46, 1946–47, 1949–50), Greek Cup: 2 (1948–49, 1949–50)

Runners-up: Panhellenic Championship: 1 (1945–46), Greek Cup: 1 (1947–48), Athens Championship: 2 (1950―51, 1951–52)

Under the English manager, Jack Beby, veteran players such as Maropoulos, Tzanetis, Delavinias and Magiras, along with a new generation of players such as Kostas Poulis, Goulios and Pavlos Emmanouilidis, AEK won the 1949 and 1950 Cups, beating Panathinaikos by 2–1 and Aris by 4–0.

In 1950 AEK won another Athens Championship, but the Panhellenic Championship was not played, due to the large number of players who were called up for a prolonged training camp with the national team.

=== A new generation of stars (1952–1959) ===
Honours won: Greek Cup: 1 (1955–56)

Runners-up: Panhellenic Championship: 2 (1957–58, 1958–59), Greek Cup: 1 (1952–53), Athens Championship: 2 (1953–54, 1957–58)

The early 1950s saw the emergence of a new generation of star footballers, including Giannis Kanakis, Andreas Stamatiadis and Stelios Serafidis, alongside Poulis and Emmanouilidis.

In 1955, AEK signed Kostas Nestoridis, who was regarded as the best player of his era. His former club Panionios did not consent to the transfer, so Nestoridis was banned for two seasons, due to the regulations that were applied at the time. When his ban ended, Nestoridis finished as the league's top scorer, demonstrating his quality. AEK won the Cup in 1956, this time beating Olympiacos by 2–1 in the final.

== The early Alpha Ethniki years (1959–1974) ==
Honours won: Alpha Ethniki: 3 (1962–63, 1967–68, 1970–71), Greek Cup: 2 (1963–64, 1965–66)

Runners-up: Alpha Ethniki: 4 (1959–60, 1964–65, 1966–67, 1969–70), Balkans Cup: 1 (1966–67)

=== 1959–60 season ===
In the first season of the newly formed Alpha Ethniki, AEK, under Lukas Aurednik, were strengthened with Giannis Marditsis and Alekos Sofianidis, while Kostas Poulis left after 11 years. In the first matchday on 25 October, Giannis Kanakis scored the first goal in the history of Alpha Ethniki in the 3rd minute against Ethnikos Piraeus. However, Kanakis retired in midseason after 12 years of service to the club. The end of the championship found AEK and Panathinaikos tied at the top and thus the champion was to be determined by a play-off match. In the match that took place on 31 July, despite taking the lead, AEK eventually lost, as the "greens" overturned the score and won by 2–1. Kostas Nestoridis won the top scorer award for the second consecutive time.

=== 1960–61 season ===
AEK began the season under Tryfon Tzanetis, who was officially appointed in January. However, Aurednik remained in the club alongside the former player Christos Ribas. Spyros Pomonis was promoted from the academies. A series of incidents with referees, combined with a number of poor results, prevented AEK from challenging for the title and led to Aurednik stepping down as manager. Tzanetis' third spell in charge did not change the team's fortunes, as AEK finished fourth. The roster was strengthened with the arrival of Stelios Skevofilakas. Kostas Nestoridis successfully defended his title as the top scorer of the league, for a third consecutive season.

=== 1961–62 season ===
AEK signed Panikos Krystallis, while Pavlos Emmanouilidis left. In January, Nikos Goumas completed construction on the Nea Filadelfeia Stadium, which was modernized with the reconstruction of its stands and with the installation of a grass pitch. Strong competition from other clubs, which proved more consistent, prevented AEK from finishing higher than the fourth place for a second consecutive season. Kostas Nestoridis once again finished as the league's top scorer for a fourth consecutive time.

=== 1962–63 season ===

Lineup against Panathinaikos (1963-06-23)

Nikos Goumas appointed the Hungarian-German manager, Jenő Csaknady who introduced a disciplined approach, innovative training methods and new tactical systems. Mimis Papaioannou and the Syrian Ibrahim Mughrabi, the first foreign player to ever play for a Greek club, were among the arrivals. AEK finished level with Panathinaikos at the top of the table, leading to a championship play-off. Panathinaikos initially took the lead, the yellow-blacks made it 3–1, but the greens responded making the final 3–3. Thus, under the regulations of the time AEK won the title due to a better goal ratio. With AEK winning their first post-war league title, Nestoridis finished as the league's top scorer for the fifth and final time in his career with 23 goals, setting a record for consecutive wins of the award.

=== 1963–64 season ===
In 1963, the club dismissed Csaknády and Heinrich Müller was appointed. Ibrahim Mughrabi and Panikos Krystallis left the club and returned to their respective countries. Aleko Yordan and Kostas Papageorgiou were among the additions.

AEK made their debut in UEFA competitions, in the preliminary round of the European Cup, where they were eliminated by Monaco.

AEK ended up finishing third, but they won the Cup, although the final was not played, since the other semi-finalists, Panathinaikos and Olympiacos were disqualified following serious incidents involving their fans in the semi-final at Leoforos Alexandras Stadium. After Kostas Nestoridis' five consecutive wins, the league's top scorer was Mimis Papaioannou, who with 29 goals kept the award within the club. At the end of the season Müller left the club due to financial disagreements over the renewal of his contract.

=== 1964–65 season ===

Lineup against Dinamo Zagreb (1964-09-09)

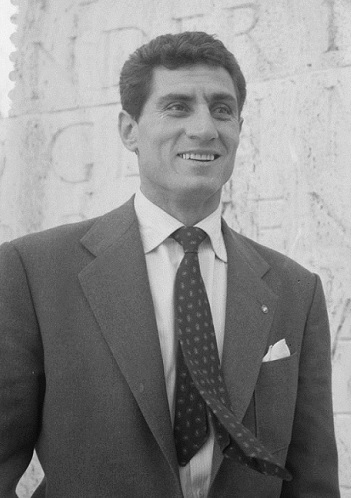
Küçükandonyadis

In the summer of 1964 Mirko Kokotović was appointed manager. AEK signed Fotis Balopoulos, Giorgos Kefalidis and Lefter Küçükandonyadis. Giannis Marditsis was among the departures.

AEK played for the first time in the Cup Winners' Cup against Dinamo Zagreb. Despite their elimination from the tournament, they achieved their first European victory in the first leg.

AEK challenged for the league title until the final matchday, but eventually finished second. Kokotović was dismissed after the end of the season.

=== 1965–66 season ===
In the summer of 1965, Tryfon Tzanetis in his fourth and final spell at the club, strengthened the squad with the signings of Tasos Vasiliou, Kostas Nikolaidis and Panagiotis Ventouris. On the other side, Lefter Küçükandonyadis retired.

In a friendly match between AEK and Real Madrid, Mimis Papaioannou had an impressive performance and the Spaniards made a substantial offer for his transfer. The administration's refusal led to his departure from the club. Ηowever, shortly before the derby with Panathinaikos, AEK offered a new contract to Papaioannou, who returned to the club. However, Ventouris came into conflict with the administration and left for Cape Town.

In the away match against Panathinaikos, while the score was at 1–1, the referee awarded an off-side goal to the greens and as a result incidents occurred with the supporters entering the pitch, which resulted in suspension of the match and its award to Panathinaikos. As a protest, AEK were absent in the next matchday, but with the fear of relegation they were forced to return to the championship, eventually finishing third. Papaioannou won the top scorer award for the second time in his career with 23 goals, succeeding Nestoridis, who had departed midseason, in being the team's leader.

In the Cup, AEK qualified to the final against Olympiacos and the HFF scheduled the match for 10 July, at the Karaiskakis Stadium, which provoked a reaction from Olympiacos, who announced that they would not participate. Thus, on 7 July the HFF, unable to persuade Olympiacos to change their decision, declared AEK the Cup winners.

=== 1966–67 season ===
Panagiotis Ventouris returned from his spell at South Africa, Vasilis Mastrakoulis was acquired, while Giorgos Petridis left the club. AEK started the season with the European Cup Winners' Cup, playing against Braga, but they were eliminated with two defeats. In December, Tzanetis decided to resign from the bench of the club. After about a month with Georgios Magiras taking charge temporarily, Jenő Csaknády returned after three and a half years. As AEK remained in contention for the title, the government was overthrown and a military dictatorship was imposed on the country, resulting in the interruption of the championship. AEK were not affected by the interruption and continued to challenge for the title, but two draws in the final matchdays ended their chances of winning the championship, finishing second. They also competed in the Balkans Cup, finishing first in their group and qualified in the final against Fenerbahçe. In the first leg at Nea Filadelfeia, AEK won 2–1, but in Istanbul, the Turks won 1–0 and a third match was set at Mithat Paşa, which they lost 3–1.

Lineup against Fenerbahçe (1967-10-11)

=== 1967–68 season ===
AEK emerged as strong contenders for the league, as they defeated Olympiacos 4–1 away from home. Indeed, with a home victory over the same opponent in the second round, they secured the title. Csaknády did not agree to remain at the club, becoming the only manager of AEK to win two championship titles in his two full seasons.

=== 1968–69 season ===
It was a transitional season for AEK, as they appointed Branko Stanković as manager. Giorgos Lavaridis was promoted from the academy. Under Stanković the team's model was based on tactics, technique, physical strength and discipline. The inability of the players to quickly adapt to the new model resulted in a poor start in the league, but in time they began to improve their performances. On 27 October they defeated Olympiacos by 2–3, with Papaioannou playing as goalkeeper from the 85th minute, due to the suspension of Serafidis. AEK remained in contention for the title, until the 22nd matchday when they were defeated at home by Olympiacos, which ended their title challenge, as they eventually finished sixth. However, AEK had one of the most impressive European campaigns, eliminating Jeunesse Esch in the first round and AB in the second round and became the first Greek club to reach the quarter-finals of a European competition, where they were eliminated by Spartak Trnava.

=== 1969–70 season ===
Stanković began rebuilding the squad, as Stefanos Theodoridis was promoted to the senior team, while the club signed Apostolos Toskas and Andreas Papaemmanouil among others. At the same time Alekos Sofianidis, Aleko Yordan, Andreas Stamatiadis and Kostas Papageorgiou departed, while Lakis Frogoudakis retired in midseason. Finishing second in the league was considered a success, considering the extensive changes in the squad and the strength of Panathinaikos at the time. In the Cup, AEK were eliminated in the second round by Panathinaikos at home, losing by 5–3 in the penalty shootout.

=== 1970–71 season ===
Stanković completed the renewal of the roster, building a well-organized team. Tasos Vasiliou and Fotis Balopoulos left the club. AEK began their campaign with the Inter-Cities Fairs Cup, where they were eliminated in the first round by the newly formed Twente. Despite their elimination, AEK produced strong performances throughout the season and won the league, with several matches remaining.

=== 1971–72 season ===

Lineup against Internazionale (1971-09-29)

Administrative disputes and demands from the players within the club resulted in the start of a declining period for AEK. However, that did not prevent AEK from presenting a competitive team. Lakis Nikolaou stood out among the transfers. AEK played in the European Cup and were eliminated in the first round by Internazionale, but they achieved a historic 3–2 win at Nea Filadelfeia. In the league they finished third, while in the cup they experienced a surprise elimination in the round of 16 by Lamia.

=== 1972–73 season ===
The declining course of AEK continued. Players such as Petros Ravousis, Tasos Konstantinou, Lakis Stergioudas and Dionysis Tsamis were signed. On the other hand, Stelios Serafidis retired after 19 years at the club, while Panagiotis Ventouris and Andreas Papaemmanouil also departed.

In their first appearance in the UEFA Cup, after eliminating Salgótarján, AEK were eliminated in the second round by Liverpool. In the Cup they faced again a surprise elimination by Apollon Kalamarias in the round of 16, which resulted in the removal of Stanković after five years at the club. After a short period under Kostas Chatzimichail, Billy Bingham was appointed as a replacement of Stanković. In a bad season for the club, the Irish manager was unable to improve the team's fortunes. In the end AEK finished fifth and Bingham was dismissed at the end of the season.

=== 1973–74 season ===
Amid continued administrative changes and financial difficulties, the English manager Stan Anderson was appointed. Giorgos Sidiropoulos was acquired, while Stelios Konstantinidis, Kostas Nikolaidis and Spyros Pomonis left. In a disappointing season, Anderson was sacked and the season ended under the manager of the reserve team, Kostas Chatzimichail. AEK finished fifth for the second consecutive season.

== The Barlos ownership years (1974–1981) ==
Honours won: Alpha Ethniki: 2 (1977–78, 1978–79), Greek Cup: 1 (1977–78)

Runners-up: Alpha Ethniki: 3 (1974–75, 1975–76, 1980–81), Greek Cup: 1 (1978–79)

=== 1974–75 season ===
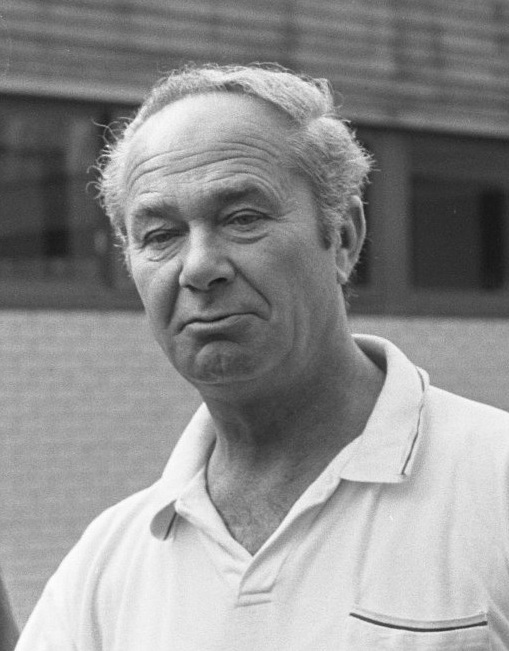
František Fadrhonc

Major changes took place at the club, as Loukas Barlos became the new president. He began rebuilding the team by appointing František Fadrhonc as manager. The Czechoslovak introduced a series of innovations to the club, while Barlos signed players such as Christos Ardizoglou Georgios Dedes, Walter Wagner and Timo Zahnleiter. Among the departures, were those of Giorgos Karafeskos and Nikos Stathopoulos.

The newly rebuilt AEK played impressive football in their first season, finishing second in the league, having the best attack and defense, while they reached the quarter-finals of the Cup.

=== 1975–76 season ===
AEK continued their upward trajectory with Barlos prioritizing the signing of Thomas Mavros from Panionios. The president of AEK approached and convinced Mavros to join the club, but the transfer was opposed by Panionios. A legal dispute followed, leaving Mavros unable to play for a season. Giorgos Lavaridis was among the departures.

Fadrhonc's work was beginning to bear fruit, creating a team that combined spectacle and results. AEK returned in the UEFA Cup, after two years of absence, reaching the second round, where they were eliminated by Inter Bratislava.

In the league, AEK, despite being undefeated for 23 matches, a number of defeats towards the end of the season saw them finish second for a second consecutive season. Georgios Dedes with 15 goals won the top scorer award.

=== 1976–77 season ===

Lineup against QPR (1977-03-02)

The team that Barlos had envisioned with Fadrhonc was taking shape. After the legal dispute with Panionios ended, the transfer of Mavros was completed. Furthermore, they signed Nikos Christidis, Takis Nikoloudis and Babis Intzoglou. Fadrhonc, considering the playing intelligence and high technical qualities of Mimis Papaioannou, decided to relocate him as an attacking midfielder, in order to fit all the attackers of the roster.

In the UEFA Cup AEK eliminated Dynamo Moscow in the first round, Derby County in the second round, Red Star Belgrade in the third round and QPR in the quarter-finals reaching the semi-finals, where they were eliminated by Juventus, becoming the first Greek club to reach that stage.

A series of poor results in matches played around the European games, resulted in AEK finishing fourth, at a distance of three points from the top.

=== 1977–78 season ===
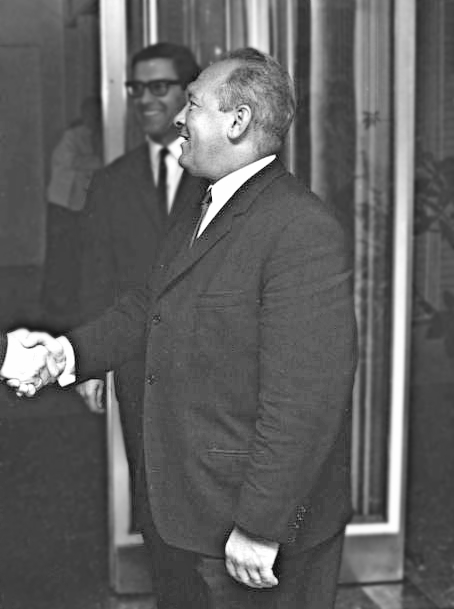
Zlatko Čajkovski

Lineup against Olympiacos (1978-05-17)

Barlos strengthened the roster with Milton Viera and Dušan Bajević, while Walter Wagner and Georgios Dedes among others departed.

Disagreements between Barlos and Fadrhonc over the future of AEK emerged, which resulted in the dismissal of the Czechoslovak after an away defeat at the second matchday. Fadrhonc's assistant, Andreas Stamatiadis took charge for the next two matches until Zlatko Čajkovski was appointed.

In the UEFA Cup, after eliminating ASA Târgu Mureș in the first round, AEK were eliminated in the second round by Standard Liège.

With the pairing of Bajević with Mavros in the offense, AEK played impressive football and they won the league comfortably, suffering only two defeats. Thomas Mavros claimed the top scorer of the league award with 22 goals.

In the Cup, AEK, eliminated AO Chania in the first round, Panathinaikos in the second round, Panionios in the round of 16 and Panelefsiniakos in the quarter-finals. In the semi-finals thrashed Olympiacos with 6–1 and advanced in the final facing PAOK. There, they won 2–0 and got the trophy, achieving the second domestic double in their history. Dušan Bajević emerged as the top scorer of the Cup with nine goals. Despite this being one of the most successful seasons in the club's history, Čajkovski had already signed with Zürich for the next season.

=== 1978–79 season ===
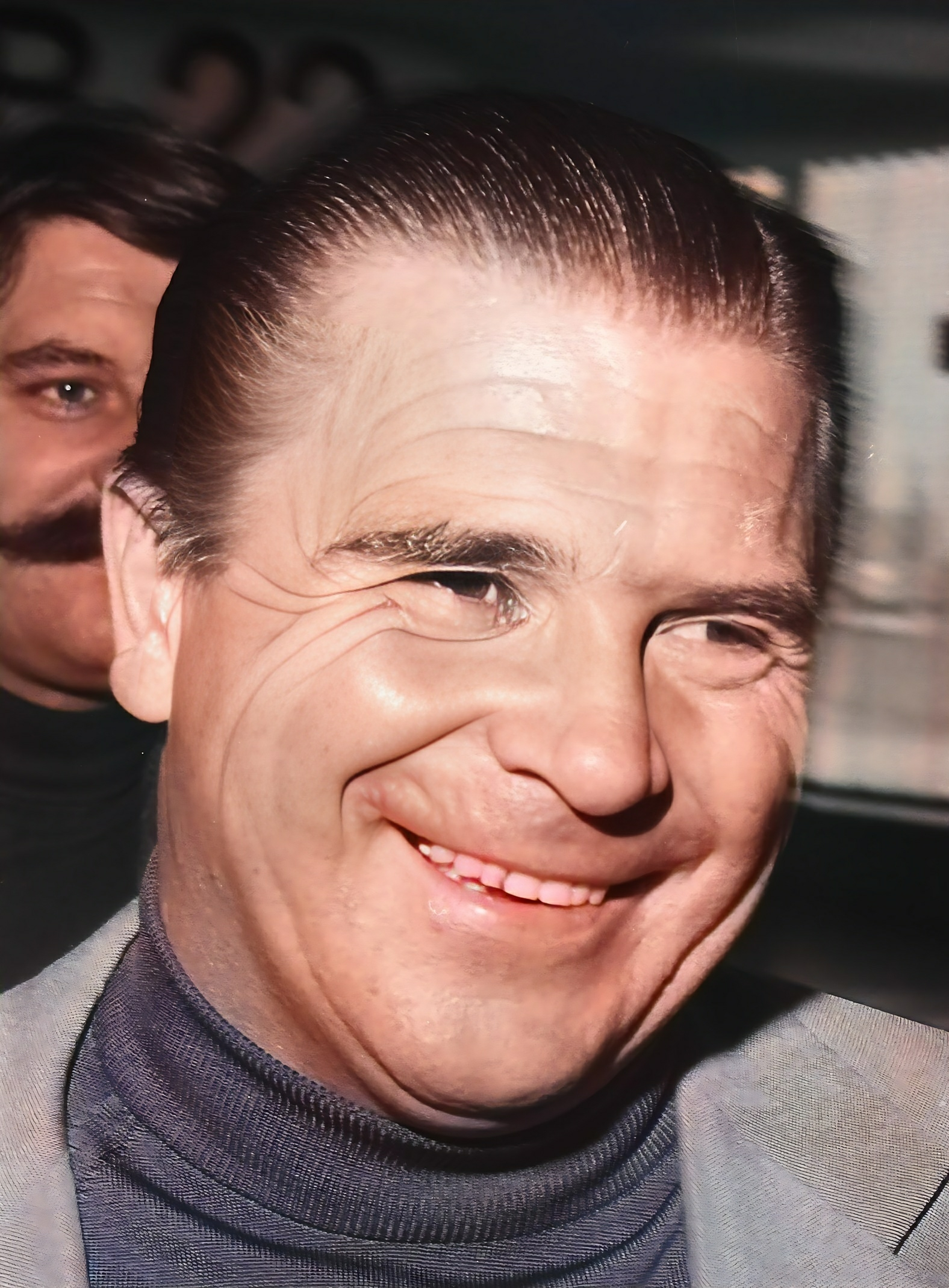
Ferenc Puskás

Lineup against Porto (1978-09-13)

The notable additions included the promotions of Spyros Ikonomopoulos and Panagiotis Stylianopoulos, but most notably the captain of Panathinaikos, Mimis Domazos. Barlos appointed Ferenc Puskás as the manager of the team.

In the league, AEK started impressively and were ahead in the standings with Olympiacos being the only rival for the title. However, there were many official complaints from the opponents of Olympiacos for attempts of bribery by the red and whites. In the European Cup, AEK were drawn against Porto in the first round and they achieved their greatest victory in the European Cup, recording a 6–1 victory over the Portuguese champions, while in the rematch AEK lost by 4–1. In the second round they faced Nottingham Forest, who eliminated them with two wins.

Towards the end of the season, AEK presented a decline in their performance and Barlos removed Puskás from the bench. Puskás' assistant, Andreas Stamatiadis took charge for the rest of the season. The end of the championship found AEK and Olympiacos tied in the first place and a play-off match for the title was set. After Olympiacos failed to appear for the match, AEK were declared champions. In the Cup, AEK easily reached the final, where they faced Panionios and despite taking the lead early on, they lost 3–1. Thomas Mavros was declared the top scorer of the league with 31 goals and 40 in total, winning the European Silver Shoe.

=== 1979–80 season ===
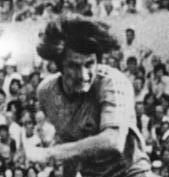
Dušan Bajević

In 1979 football in Greece became professional with the chairman, Loukas Barlos becoming the first owner of AEK. His last contribution to the club was the construction of the first two-story podium in a Greek stadium, the so-called "Skepasti" (The Covered). In terms of transfers, AEK mostly promoted players from their academy, such as Stelios Manolas, Lysandros Georgamlis and Vangelis Vlachos, while also signing Franjo Vladić. On the other hand, Apostolos Toskas, Milton Viera, and most importantly Mimis Papaioannou, left the club. Hermann Stessl was appointed manager.

AEK were eliminated in the first round of the European Cup by Argeș Pitești. Following incidents in the dressing room and the referees' room, UEFA imposed a one-year ban on the club.

AEK did not start the championship well and were left behind in the standings, while in the Cup they were eliminated by PAOK in the round of 16. In the first winter transfer period in Greek football, AEK were weakened as Mimis Domazos, Takis Nikoloudis and Dionysis Tsamis departed. A series of bad results brought the dismissal of Stessl from the bench. Miltos Papapostolou took charge in his place.

The team returned to the successful results and with the 25 goals of Bajević, who emerged as the league's top scorer, finished tied with Panathinaikos in third place, two points from the top and a play-off match was set for the third place and a ticket to the UEFA Cup. As AEK were excluded from European competitions, the result would not affect Panathinaikos' qualification for the UEFA Cup, while an AEK victory would allow the club to serve its suspension immediately. Even though Panathinaikos appeared reluctant to play the match, Barlos insisted that it be played and the match went ahead as scheduled with AEK losing by 1–0 and finished fourth.

=== 1980–81 season ===
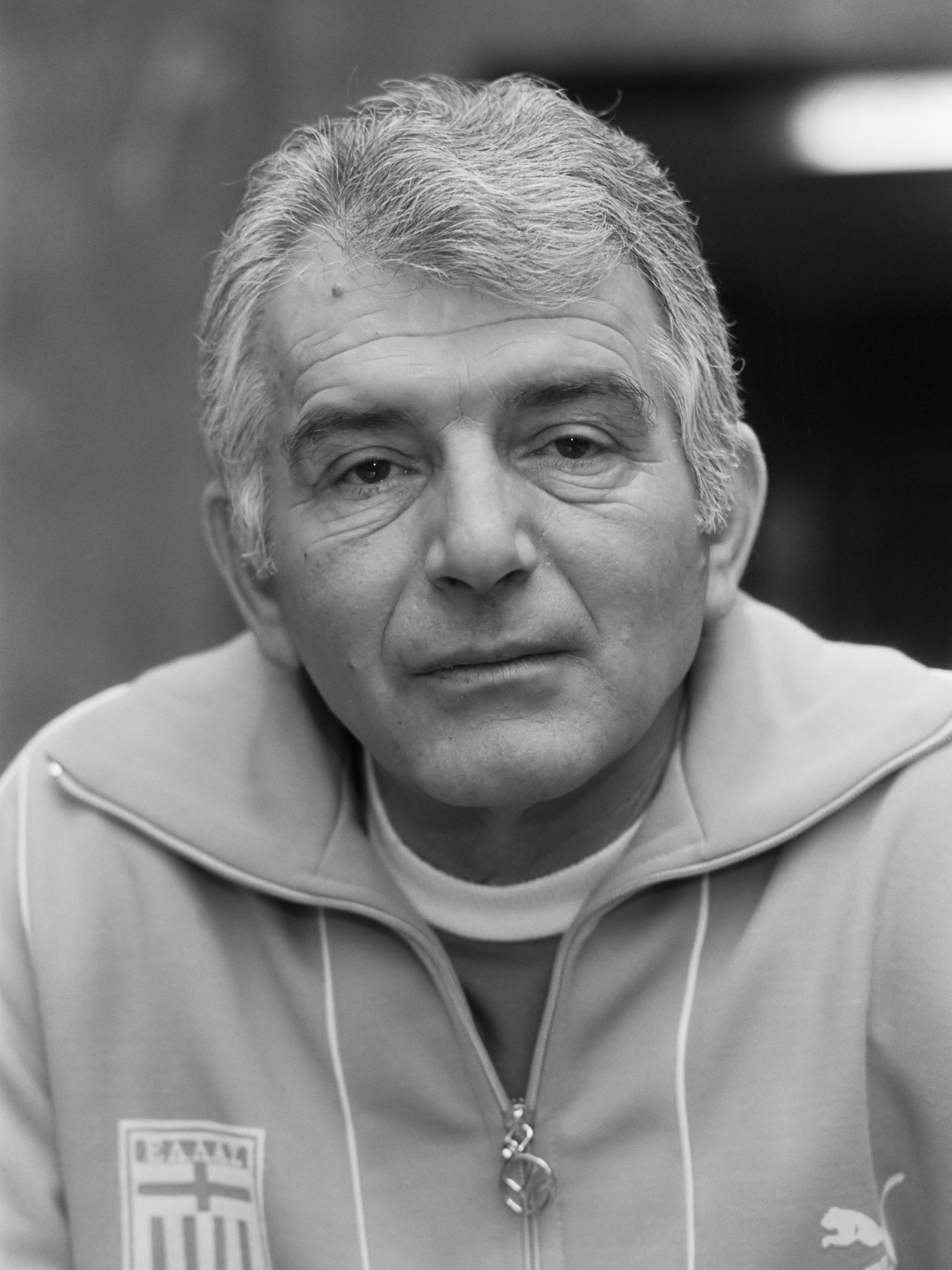
Miltos Papapostolou

AEK were entering the final season of one of the most successful periods in their history, as the ownership of Barlos was coming to an end. AEK signed Michalis Tzirakis, Kostas Eleftherakis and Manolis Kottis among others. Babis Intzoglou was among the departures. In the winter Petros Karavitis was acquired, while Tasos Konstantinou departed.

Having been excluded from UEFA competitions, AEK competed in the Balkans Cup, where in the group stage, all three clubs finished level on points and Velež Mostar with a better goal ratio qualified for the final.

In the league, AEK finished in the second place, while in the Cup they were eliminated in the semi-finals by PAOK.

== The post-Barlos sterile years (1981–1988) ==
Honours won: Greek Cup: 1 (1982–83)

Runners-up: Alpha Ethniki (1987–88)

=== 1981–82 season ===
After the departure of Loukas Barlos the ownership of the club was taken over by Andreas Zafiropoulos. The new administration proceeded with the renewal of the roster with the signings of Takis Karagiozopoulos, Giannis Dintsikos, Dinos Ballis and Hristo Bonev. Dušan Bajević, Franjo Vladić and Kostas Eleftherakis left. Hans Tilkowski was appointed manager. AEK made one of the worst starts in their history and Tilkowski was fired midseason. Zlatko Čajkovski returned on the bench after four years. AEK recovered competitively, but not enough to challenge for the title. In the Cup, AEK faced PAOK in the round of 16 and were again eliminated. AEK eventually finished fourth in the league and managed to secure a spot in the European competitions, after a two-year absence.

=== 1982–83 season ===

Lineup against PAOK (1983-06-29)

In the summer of 1982, Zafiropoulos stepped out of the presidency, which was handed over to the shipowner Michalis Arkadis. Takis Nikoloudis returned to AEK and transfers of Christos Arvanitis and Angel Kolev took place. Hristo Bonev, Petros Karavitis and Giannis Mousouris left the club, while Nikos Christidis and Lakis Nikolaou retired. AEK competed in the UEFA Cup, where they played against Köln in the first round and were eliminated with two defeats. As the season progressed, Čajkovski's strained relations with some players and the administration caused controversy and after a series of poor results, he was dismissed. After a brief spell with Kostas Nestoridis in charge, Helmut Senekowitsch was appointed. The team finished third in the league. AEK ended the season by winning the Cup, by defeating PAOK by 2–0 at the Olympic Stadium in the final that was marked by crowd incidents.

=== 1983–84 season ===
In the summer of 1983, AEK faced another administrative change in their presidency, as Michalis Arkadis departed and the Cypriot travel agency owner, Lefteris Panagidis replaced him. The English manager John Barnwell was appointed, while Pavlos Papaioannou was acquired among others. On the other hand, Michalis Tzirakis left the club. After a bad start and the elimination from the Cup Winners' Cup in the first round by Újpest, Barnwell was fired. Helmut Senekowitsch returned as manager. In December Takis Nikoloudis and Angel Kolev left the club. Senekowitsch did not manage to change the poor performances of the club and was also fired after two and a half months. With Kostas Nestoridis on the bench, AEK completed a bad season, where they eventually finished seventh in the league, while at the Cup were eliminated in the round of 16 by AEL.

=== 1984–85 season ===
In the summer of 1984, Zafiropoulos returned to the club's presidency. Petros Ravousis and Lakis Stergioudas left the club. AEK strengthened their squad with Håkan Sandberg, František Štambachr, Nikos Pias, Theologis Papadopoulos and Makis Chatzis, while Václav Halama was appointed manager. AEK did not start well, while in the Cup they suffered a shock elimination by Lamia. Before the middle of the season, Zafiropoulos dismissed Halama. Antonis Georgiadis was appointed as the new manager. In December, František Štambachr left the club, while Márton Esterházy arrived. Esterházy, alongside Mavros and Sandberg formed a formidable attacking trio. Eventually, AEK finished third in the league, tied with Panathinaikos and three points from the top. Thomas Mavros finished once more as the league's top scorer, with 27 goals.

=== 1985–86 season ===

Lineup against Real Madrid (1985-09-18)

Antonis Georgiadis left the club and Jacek Gmoch was appointed. Among the departures were Christos Ardizoglou and Christos Arvanitis. In the winter AEK signed Jim Patikas, while Vangelis Vlachos and Lysandros Georgamlis joined Panathinaikos. AEK had to move to the Olympic Stadium due to construction works at AEK Stadium. AEK set a record average league attendance of 31,254 spectators per match. In the UEFA Cup, AEK were eliminated in the first round by Real Madrid, despite recording a historic 1–0 victory in Athens. In the league AEK started well, but their performances in the away matches resulted in a number of defeats during the season. They finished at the third place, tied with Iraklis, seven points from the first place. On 19 April, the general manager of AEK, Giannis Chrysovitsianos, was arrested for attempted bribery to some players of Panserraikos and the final league standings were not finalized until the case was concluded. Eventually, that happened in mid-June, with AEK being punished with a three-point deduction from the next season's championship. Thus, the HFF decided to set a third place play-off match between AEK and Iraklis. Meanwhile, Jacek Gmoch left, with Nikos Christidis sitting on the bench for the match. Iraklis, not accepting the decision, showed up and deliberately turned the match into a farce, being reduced to six players by the 53rd minute, resulting in the match being awarded to AEK, who secured a place in the next season's UEFA Cup.

=== 1986–87 season ===
The crowd reactions towards Zafiropoulos became more intense, while financial problems began to appear in the club. Nevertheless, AEK proceeded with the transfers of Giorgos Peppes and Lampros Georgiadis, while in the winter they were also strengthened with Rajko Janjanin. At the same time, Márton Esterházy and Dinos Ballis departed. Zafiropoulos appointed Ab Fafié for the position of the manager. In the UEFA Cup, AEK faced Internazionale and were eliminated with two defeats. The elimination from the Cup at the hands of Panionios, combined with the bad results in the home matches, resulted in Fafié getting sacked in December. In a strange decision, Zafiropoulos appointed Nikos Alefantos. AEK continued their instability in their performances and increasingly frustrated the supporters. In a home game Alefantos substituted Thomas Mavros, who had returned after an injury, with the crowd disapproving the substitution. In the press conference of the match, Alefantos spoke out against Mavros, considering him as a "finished" footballer. Those incidents led to the departure of Mavros, after 11 years at the club. Shortly after, the poor results led to the dismissal of Alefantos and AEK finished the season with Nikos Christidis on the bench. AEK did not compete in the last three matchdays of the league, due to a strike called by the Footballers' Union and were punished with a deduction of six points, finishing in the seventh place.

=== 1987–88 season ===
AEK returned to Nea Filadelfeia Stadium. Håkan Sandberg departed, while Giorgos Savvidis, Henrik Nielsen, Vasilios Vasilakos and Georgios Koutoulas arrived. Todor Veselinović was appointed as manager. AEK were in the title race, with AEL as their only serious challengers. After the victory of AEL over Panathinaikos, their footballer, Georgi Tsingov, was tested positive for doping and the case was referred to the courts and became known as the "Tsingov case". In the Cup, AEK reached the round of 16, facing Olympiacos. After the away 1–1, a scandal broke out on the eve of the rematch, as the former footballer of AEK, Dinos Ballis visited the hotel where the club were staying with a bouquet for Theologis Papadopoulos, raising suspicions that he was attempting to bribe Papadopoulos. Olympiacos won the match by 1–3, eliminating them from the Cup and the case subsequently continued in court. The Koskotas brothers of Olympiacos were accused of trying to bribe Papadopoulos and Vasilakos through Ballis, with only the latter ultimately being punished for attempted bribery. In the "Tsingov case", AEL were initially awarded a defeat by default, a 2-point deduction and punishment of the footballer, which brought AEK to the top of the table. AEL appealed, with their supporters protesting, resulting in an overnight change to the regulation and the return of the points, which led to their eventual conquest of the championship. In the last matchday of the season at Nea Filadelfeia, the tension between the ultras of the club and Andreas Zafiropoulos reached its peak, when the riot police invaded the ultra's stand which resulted in heated encounters, that led in his withdrawal from the presidency. Henrik Nielsen with 21 goals finished the season as the league's top scorer.

== Golden Years (1988–1997) ==
Honours won: Alpha Ethniki: 4 (1988–89, 1991–92, 1992–93, 1993–94), Greek Cup: 2 (1995–96, 1996–97), Greek Super Cup: 2 (1989, 1996), Greek League Cup: 1 (1990)

Runners-up: Alpha Ethniki: 3 (1989–90, 1995–96, 1996–97), Greek Super Cup: 3 (1992, 1993, 1994), Greek Cup: 2 (1993–94, 1994–95)

=== 1988–89 season ===

Lineup against Olympiacos (1989-05-07)

Andreas Zafiropoulos handed over the presidency of AEK to the nightclub owner, Stratos Gidopoulos. Dušan Bajević returned after years, as their new manager. Gidopoulos, supported the Yugoslav in building a well-balanced squad with the signings of Mirosław Okoński and Antonis Minou. After the last season's "Ballis-Papadopoulos" case, Theologis Papadopoulos and Vasilios Vasilakos were released, Rajko Janjanin retired, while Panagiotis Stylianopoulos left.

Despite their good performances and having the best defense in the league, AEK seemed to be outsiders for the title. The team competed in the UEFA Cup, where they played against Athletic Bilbao and even though they won by 1–0 at home, they were eliminated with a 2–0 defeat in the rematch. In the Cup, AEK were eliminated in the second round by Levadiakos. In December Frank Klopas, Stavros Stamatis and Toni Savevski arrived, while Henrik Nielsen departed. The most crucial match of the season was the away game against Olympiacos for the penultimate matchday, which was a decider for the title, where the defense of AEK held firm and in a counterattack, Karagiozopoulos played a "one-two" with Okonski and scored the "golden" goal, , securing AEK a 1–0 victory and the title.

=== 1989–90 season ===

Lineup against Dynamo Dresden (1989-09-27)

Having won the last year's championship and with the addition of Daniel Batista in their roster, AEK started the season with great optimism. Dimitris Pittas left the club and Giannis Dintsikos retired.

AEK started well, by winning the Super Cup against Panathinaikos on penalties, while in the European Cup faced Dynamo Dresden and despite losing 1–0 in Germany, with an excellent performance in the rematch, they prevailed with 5–3 and advanced to the second round. There, they faced Marseille and the first match in France, AEK lost 2–0, while in the rematch that ended 1–1 the French reported an attack on their bus, with UEFA eventually punishing AEK with a one-year ban from all European competitions. In the Cup, they were eliminated for a second consecutive season of shock-elimination in the round of 32, by Ionikos. The team had the best defense in the league for a second consecutive year, but ultimately finished second. AEK completed their competitive obligations with the conquest of the League Cup against Olympiacos, in an institution that took place only that season.

=== 1990–91 season ===
AEK faced administrative problems and most of the season was part of the transitional period, as the ownership of Zafiropoulos was coming to its end. AEK maintained their core roster with their main addition being that of Vaios Karagiannis. The team did not compete in any European competition, due to the last season's ban.

AEK finished 3rd, with the only positive element being the time credit that was given to Bajević, to re-build the team for the oncoming seasons. The problems that the club was facing during the season resulted in a temporary administration led by Kostas Generakis, who was chosen by the Court of First Instance.

=== 1991–92 season ===
The new administration put the club's finances in order and at the same time proceeded in the signings of Refik Šabanadžović, Vasilis Dimitriadis and Alexis Alexandris, while Mirosław Okoński and Georgios Christodoulou departed. AEK Stadium was renamed to "Nikos Goumas Stadium", after the former president of the club, who had a significant contribution to its construction.

In the UEFA Cup, they easily eliminated Vllaznia Shkodër in the first round and Spartak Moscow in the second round, while in the third round they faced Torino and were eliminated. In the Cup, AEK reached the semi-finals, facing PAOK and despite their 2–0 win, they were eliminated at extra time with a 3–0 defeat. In the end, they played solid football and won the title, with a difference of 3 points from the second. Top scorer of the league was Dimitriadis with 28 goals. After the season was over, Dimitris Melissanidis and Giannis Karras purchased the shares of Zafiropoulos, with the former taking over the presidency.

=== 1992–93 season ===
In the summer of 1992, the new owners of the club, Melssanidis-Karras, started their tenure by helping the club recover financially and supporting Bajević. However, their term began with difficulties since Daniel Batista had already signed for Olympiacos, while Giorgos Savvidis also departed. The club signed Zoran Slišković, Georgios Agorogiannis, Tasos Mitropoulos, and Ilias Atmatsidis, while in December Vasilios Tsiartas and Charis Kopitsis also arrived.

In the first round of the newly-formed, UEFA Champions League, AEK eliminated APOEL on away goals and in the second round they faced PSV Eindhoven and despite the 1–0 win at home, they were eliminated by losing 3–0 in the rematch. AEK won the title for the second consecutive season with a 1-point difference from Panathinaikos. Dimitriadis emerged again top scorer as the league's top with 33 goals, winning the European Silver Shoe.

=== 1993–94 season ===
The administration in collaboration with the Bajević, decided to make a renewal in the roster, despite winning the championship of the previous season, with the older players Antonis Minou, Christos Vasilopoulos, Takis Karagiozopoulos, Pavlos Papaioannou and Lampros Georgiadis leaving the club and the younger players Vasilios Borbokis, Michalis Vlachos and Michalis Kasapis coming in.

In the UEFA Champions League, AEK played against Monaco and were eliminated. In the Cup, AEK reached the final, where they faced Panathinaikos, in one of the best finals, the match ended 3–3 after extra time and went to penalty shoot-out, where the greens won with 4–2. Eventually, AEK won the championship and with three successive championship wins marked one of the most successful periods in their history. Alexis Alexandris alongside Krzysztof Warzycha of Panathinaikos were the top scorers of the league with 24 goals.

=== 1994–95 season ===

Lineup against Rangers (1994-08-24)

AEK decided to make a significant investment in the squad in order to enter the Champions League group stage and signed Christos Kostis, Dimitris Saravakos, Temur Ketsbaia and Nikos Kostenoglou, while Dionysis Chiotis was promoted from the academies. Alexis Alexandris, Tasos Mitropoulos, Frank Klopas and Zoran Slišković departed from the club.

The season did not start well for the team, as they were defeated in the Super Cup by Panathinakos. AEK became the first Greek club to participate in the newly formed Champions League group stage, after eliminating Rangers with wins at both legs. There, they were eliminated after finishing third behind Ajax and AC Milan, who both reached the final, but above Casino Salzburg. AEK struggled to cope with the demands of the consecutive games both in Greece and Europe and eventually finished 5th. In the Cup they reached the final facing Panathinaikos for a second consecutive season. The match ended 0–0 and was led in extra time, where the greens won the trophy.

The duo of Melissanidis-Karras sold their shares to the businessman, Michalis Trochanas.

=== 1995–96 season ===

Lineup against Apollon (1996-05-15)

Τhe new major shareholder and president of the team, Trochanas in collaboration with Bajević, maintained the roster and strengthened it with the return of Daniel Batista and the transfer of Christos Maladenis. Among the departures were those of Georgios Agorogiannis in the summer and Stavros Stamatis in the winter.

In the UEFA Cup Winners' Cup, AEK after defeating Sion in the first round, they were eliminated by Borussia Mönchengladbach in the second round.

AEK had a quality roster and played spectacular football, but finished second. During the season, the team lost much of their concentration, as Bajević was reportedly not going to renew his contract and had agreed to join Olympiacos. Vasilios Tsiartas emerged as the league's top scorer with 26 goals.

In the Cup, AEK, after qualifying as first in their group and eliminating both their rivals, Olympiacos and Panathinaikos in the quarter-finals and semi-finals, respectively, reached the final against Apollon Athens and won the trophy with a record 7–1 victory.

=== 1996–97 season ===
In the summer of 1996, Bajević left AEK after 8 years, joining Olympiacos and Trochanas appointed his assistant and former player of the club, Petros Ravousis, as his successor. At the same time, Vasilios Tsiartas was sold to Sevilla, Refik Šabanadžović followed Bajević to Olympiacos, Dimitris Saravakos left and Spyros Ikonomopoulos retired after 19 years at the club. On the other hand, AEK signed Demis Nikolaidis and Marcelo Veridiano among others.

AEK played for the Super Cup against Panathinaikos and won 9–8 on penalties. The team had the league's best attack for a second consecutive season, but finished in second place. In the UEFA Cup Winners' Cup, AEK eliminated Chemlon Humenné in the first round, Olimpija Ljubljana in the second round and were eliminated in the third round by Paris Saint Germain. In the Cup, AEK advanced to the final for the fourth consecutive season against Panathinaikos, where after a goalless game AEK won with 5–3 on penalties and won the trophy.

== ENIC ownership years (1997–2004) ==
Honours won: Greek Cup: 2 (1999–2000, 2001–02)

Runners-up: Alpha Ethniki: 2 (1998–99, 2001–02)

=== 1997–98 season ===
Trochanas, no longer able to financially support the club, was looking for a buyer and appointed the lawyer, Alexis Kougias as president. Dumitru Dumitriu was appointed as manager. AEK lost two important footballers, Temur Ketsbaia and Vasilios Borbokis, while Giannis Kalitzakis, Arnar Grétarsson and Chrysostomos Michailidis were transferred to the club. The team started the championship well and Trochanas eventually sold his shares to the English multinational ENIC. Former AEK player, Lakis Nikolaou took over as president, contract renewals were made and in January they were strengthened with Georgios Donis and Kelvin Sebwe. In the Cup, AEK were eliminated in the round of 32 by Skoda Xanthi. In the UEFA Cup Winners' Cup AEK eliminated Dinaburg and Sturm Graz and qualified for the quarter-finals where they were eliminated by Lokomotiv Moscow. In the league AEK eventually finished third. Towards the end of the season, Dumitriu was fired and Antonis Minou took his place as an interim to close the season.

=== 1998–99 season ===
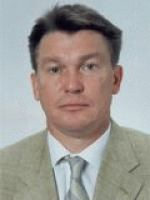
Oleg Blokhin

Dragoslav Stepanović was appointed as manager. The most notable signings of the season were Vasilios Lakis, Akis Zikos and Dimitris Markos. Following the retirement of the club's long-time captain, Stelios Manolas, Georgios Koutoulas, Christos Kostis and Marcelo Veridiano also departed. In the UEFA Cup, AEK eliminated Ferencváros in the second qualifying round and in the first round they faced Vitesse and they were eliminated from the institution.

Stepanović started well, but his performances as manager were not convincing and he was sacked after the 7th matchday. Former player Takis Karagiozopoulos took over for a while and then Oleg Blokhin was appointed. At the same time the ex-president, Dimitris Melissanidis took over the management of the club. In January they were strengthened with the loans of Christopher Wreh and Alberto Méndez.

In April, by the initiative of Melissanidis, a friendly match was organised against Partizan in Belgrade, during the height of the NATO bombing of Serbia.

At the end of the season, AEK could not claim the championship and finished second. The league's top scorer was Demis Nikolaidis with 22 goals.

=== 1999–2000 season ===

Lineup against Ionikos (2000-05-10)

Melissanidis, who had taken over the management, turned to the Serbian market appointing Ljubiša Tumbaković, while they signed Dragan Ćirić as a loan. Traianos Dellas and Sotiris Konstantinidis were also acquired and at the same time, Kevin Sebwe and Daniel Batista left the club. In early September, a major earthquake struck Parnitha and damaged part of Nikos Goumas Stadium, which was deemed unsuitable, forcing AEK to play most of their home matches at Nea Smyrni Stadium.

In the Champions League, AEK were drawn against AIK and were eliminated after a 1–0 defeat, continuing in the UEFA Cup. There, AEK eliminated Torpedo Kutaisi and MTK Budapest, but were eliminated by Monaco afterwards.

In the winter they were strengthened with the transfer of Milen Petkov. Tumbaković produced inconsistent results and in addition to the club having been eliminated from European competitions, a home defeat by Panionios resulted in his dismissal. After a brief spell of Takis Karagiozopoulos as an interim manager, Giannis Pathiakakis was appointed. After the departure of Melissanidis, the multinational owners appointed the Dutch Cornelius Sierhuis as the new president, the first foreigner to ever hold that position. Pathiakakis improved the team's morale, however they finished in 3rd place.

In the Cup, AEK reached the final, facing Ionikos, which won 3–0 to claim the trophy. However, the highlight of the match was the fair play move by Nikolaidis, who after scoring a goal with his hand, asked the referee to disallow it, which led the International Olympic Committee to award him for his sportsmanship.

=== 2000–01 season ===
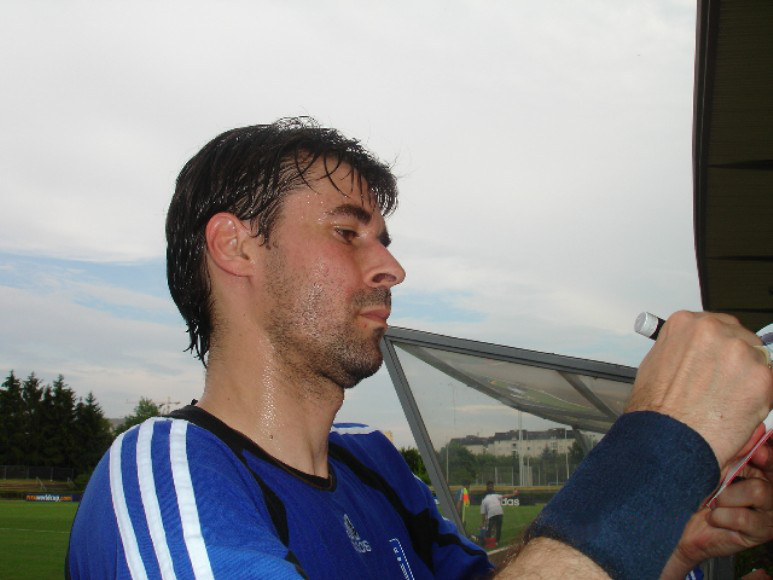
Vasilios Tsiartas

Lineup against Bayer Leverkusen (2000-11-23)

The season started with the multinational Netmed and ENIC in control of the club. Fernando Navas and Theodoros Zagorakis arrived at the club with Vasilios Tsiartas and Christos Kostis returning from abroad. The departures of Dimitris Markos and Giannis Kalitzakis stood out among others.

AEK made a mediocre start to the championship.

In the UEFA Cup, AEK eliminated Vasas, Herfølge and Bayer Leverkusen and qualified for the round of 16.

In the Cup, AEK reached the round of 16 and were drawn against Olympiacos. In the first leg and while the score was 1–0, AEK were reduced to nine men and after Olympiacos equalised, the chairman of AEK, Petros Stathis instructed the players to fake injuries in an attempt to have the match abandoned in order to prevent incidents with the supporters, resulting in Olympiacos being awarded the match. In the rematch Pathiakakis used a mix of substitutes and main players in the lineup in a 6–1 defeat. Pathiakakis left the club after the match.

After the departure of Pathiakakis, the team's captain, Toni Savevski retired as a footballer and was appointed as the new manager. AEK were strengthened with the transfers of Nikolaos Georgeas and Ivan Rusev. In the round of 16 of the UEFA Cup, AEK faced Barcelona and were eliminated. In the championship, AEK finished third.

=== 2001–02 season ===
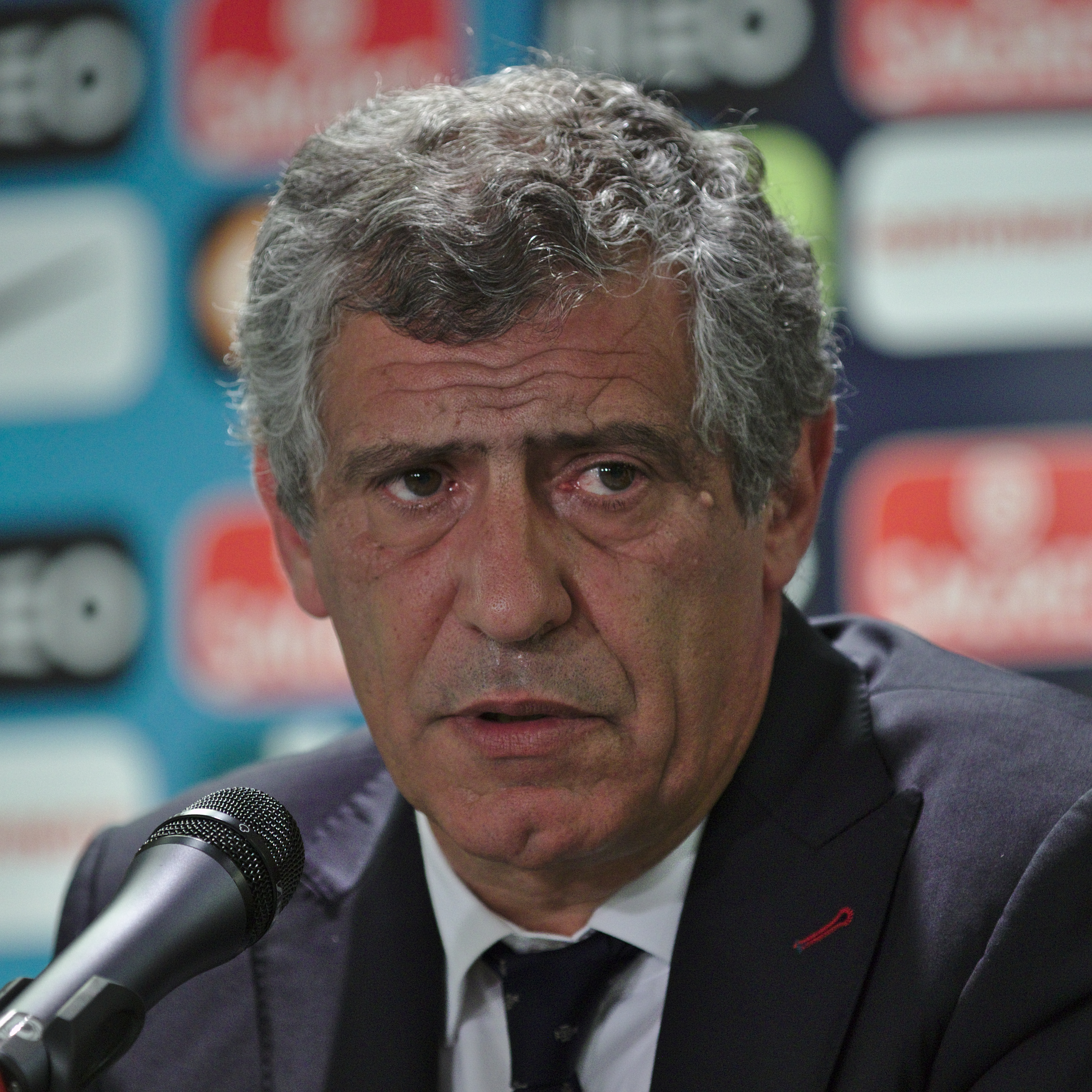
Fernando Santos

Lineup against Olympiacos (2002-04-27)

AEK were once again facing administrative and financial problems, as ENIC and Netmed were searching for a buyer for the club, with the controversial businessman Makis Psomiadis becoming their new boss. Psomiadis appointed Fernando Santos as manager, while adding to the roster, Carlos Gamarra as a loan. Among the departures of the season were those of Traianos Dellas and Charis Kopitsis.

The club performed well in all competitions and were leading the league during the winter break. In the winter transfer period, AEK were strengthened with Ilija Ivić, while Fernando Navas left. The three consecutive defeats in January allowed Olympiacos to close the gap. Eventually, in the match that was deemed as "final" for the title, AEK lost 4–3 to Olympiacos and lost the championship on a tiebreaker, with both clubs finishing on 58 points.

In the UEFA Cup, AEK eliminated Grevenmacher, Hibernian, Osijek and Litex Lovech, but were eliminated by Internazionale in the round of 16.

In the Cup, AEK reached the final against Olympiacos and won the trophy 2–1.

=== 2002–03 season ===
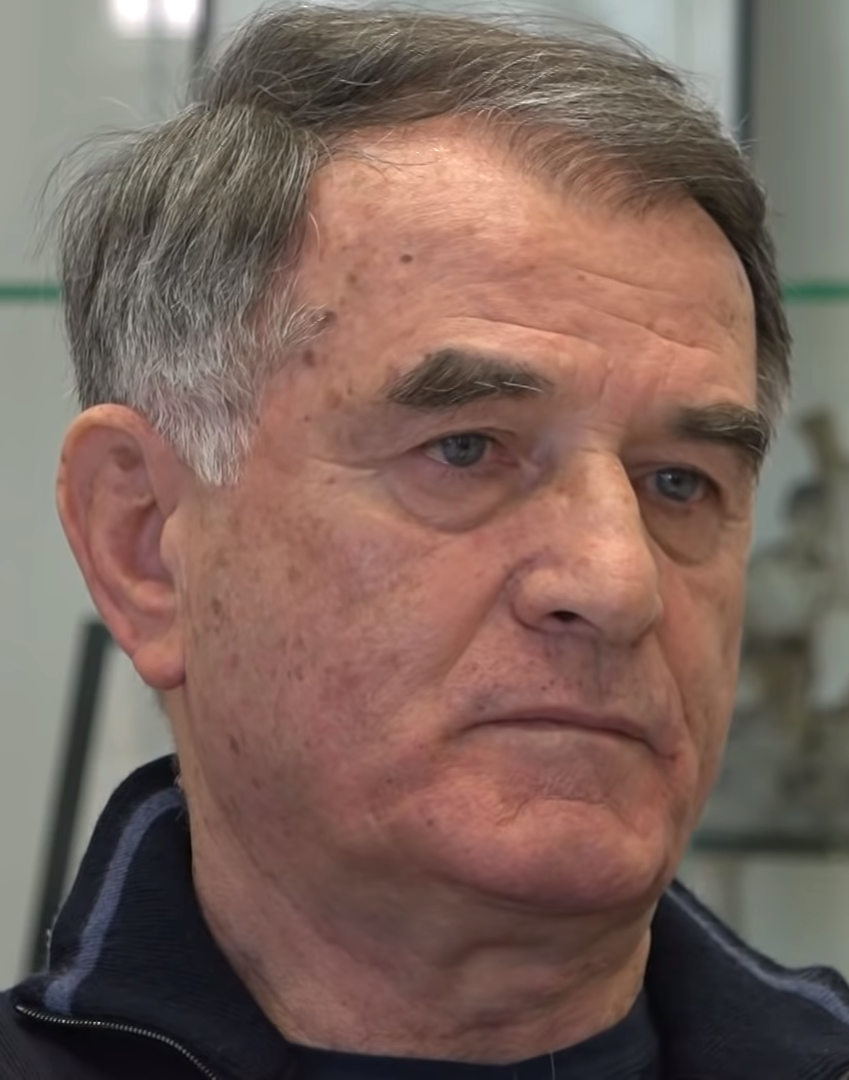
Dušan Bajević

After the resignation of Fernando Santos, Psomiadis made a controversial decision and brought back Dušan Bajević to replace him. The return of Bajević was not well received by the ultras who protested, as they considered his move to rivals Olympiacos in 1996 a high treason. Despite the departures of Akis Zikos, Vaios Karagiannis and Carlos Gamarra, AEK signed Grigoris Georgatos, Kostas Katsouranis, Michel Kreek, Mauricio Wright and Walter Centeno, while Vasilios Borbokis returned to the club.

In the qualifying round of the Champions League, AEK eliminated APOEL and qualified for the group stage. There they were placed alongside Real Madrid, Roma and Genk, setting a record by drawing all six of the group stage matches, eventually finishing 3rd and continued in the UEFA Cup. In January, Ilias Atmatsidis was released, after 12 years at the club. Having lost his support within the club, Psomiadis left, with president of Amateur AEK, Giannis Granitsas taking charge. In the round of 32 of the UEFA Cup, they eliminated Maccabi Haifa and in the round of 16, AEK faced Málaga and were eliminated. AEK challenged for the title, but finished third, two points from the top. In the Cup, AEK reached the semi-finals against PAOK and they were eliminated. The season was also marked by the demolition of Nikos Goumas Stadium, home to AEK Athens for 73 years.

=== 2003–04 season ===
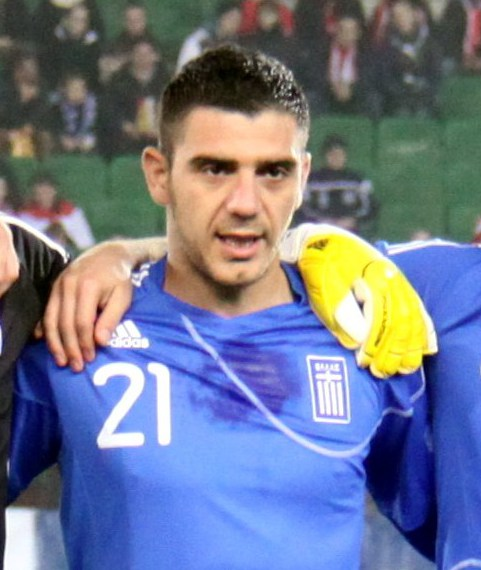
Kostas Katsouranis

The summer of 2003 started with severe financial and administrative problems, following the mismanagement under Psomiadis. Furthermore, Demis Nikolaidis, Mauricio Wright and Walter Centeno also left. The arrivals of Nikos Liberopoulos, Ioannis Okkas and Vangelis Moras were expected to help revive the club amid the growing financial problems. Since the demolition of the Nikos Goumas Stadium, AEK were forced to play in various stadiums of Athens.

AEK received a financial boost by reaching the group stage of the Champions League, as they eliminated Grasshopper. There, they were drawn with Monaco, Deportivo La Coruña and PSV Eindhoven and their European campaign came to an end, as they finished fourth with two draws and four defeats. In the winter transfer window, the team was weakened by the departures of Grigoris Georgatos and Christos Maladenis. Modest performances were not enough and unable to cope with the criticism from a large section of the supporters led to Bajević resigning in January, during the match against Iraklis. Ilie Dumitrescu was appointed as a caretaker manager. Nevertheless, Dumitrescu did not manage to change the team's fortunes, who eventually finished fourth in the league. In the Cup, AEK reached the semi-finals, where they were eliminated by Panathinaikos.

== The Demis Nikolaidis era (2004–2009) ==
Honours won: —

Runners-up: Alpha Ethniki: 2 (2005–06, 2006–07), Greek Cup: 2 (2005–06, 2008–09)

=== 2004–05 season ===
On the brink of bankruptcy, AEK lost most of their key players, including Vasilios Borbokis, Theodoros Zagorakis, Michalis Kapsis, Michel Kreek, Vasilios Lakis, Vasilios Tsiartas and Ioannis Okkas, while Michalis Kasapis and Ilija Ivić retired. Former AEK star Demis Nikolaidis persuaded a group of businessmen to buy shares in the club and invest in it, and became the new president. His primary task was to lead the club out of its precarious financial situation.

Securing the club's participation in the league, Nikolaidis began to rebuild the team and brought back Fernando Santos as manager. Santos also brought Paulo Assunção and Bruno Alves on loan from Porto, while Alessandro Soares also arrived.

With their European participation also secured, AEK eliminated Gorica in the first round of the UEFA Cup and advanced to the group stage. There, they were placed in the same group with Sevilla, Lille, Zenit Saint Petersburg and Alemannia Aachen and with four defeats in four matches were eliminated from the tournament. Winter additions included Júlio César and Vladan Ivić. AEK came close to winning the championship, but a surprise loss to Ionikos and the defeat to Panathinaikos, resulted in finishing 3rd. The course of the team in the Cup was similar, where they faced Olympiacos in the semi-finals and were eliminated.

=== 2005–06 season ===
The next season the club was strengthened with the returns of Vasilios Lakis and Traianos Dellas, while also acquiring Georgios Alexopoulos, Stefano Sorrentino, Bruno Cirillo, Sokratis Papastathopoulos and Panagiotis Kone. During the winter transfer period, AEK signed Emerson and Pantelis Kapetanos. Chrysostomos Michailidis, Nikos Kostenoglou, Ivan Rusev, Milen Petkov, Sotiris Konstantinidis and Christos Kostis were among the departures.

In the first round of UEFA Cup, AEK were drawn against Zenit Saint Petersburg. They managed to secure an away 0–0 draw, but lost by 0–1 at home and were eliminated. In the league they finished second, securing a place in the Champions League of the next season. In the Cup, AEK reached the final, where they lost the final 3–0 to Olympiacos.

=== 2006–07 season ===
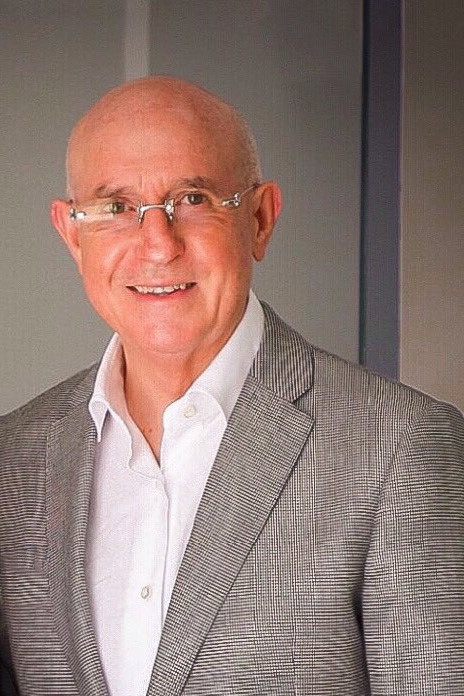
Lorenzo Serra Ferrer

Lineup against Milan (2006-11-21)

Nikolaidis decided to dismiss Fernando Santos and appointed Lorenzo Serra Ferrer as manager. Kostas Katsouranis and Alessandro Soares departed. Summer transfers included Panagiotis Lagos, Akis Zikos, Dániel Tőzsér and the loan of Gustavo Manduca.

AEK started the season by overcoming Hearts in the Champions League and qualified to the group stage. There, the club obtained 8 points, their best performance in the competition until then, beating Lille and Milan by 1–0 in their way to the third place.

In the Cup, they faced a shock-elimination in the first round by Chaidari in the penalty shoot-out.

During the winter transfer period AEK signed Pantelis Kafes.

In the round of 32 of the UEFA Cup, AEK played against Paris Saint-Germain and they were eliminated with two defeats.

In the league, AEK played good football at times and finished second securing a place in the Champions League of the next season.

=== 2007–08 season ===
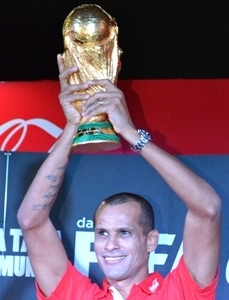
Rivaldo

Lineup against Olympiacos (2008-03-30)

The season started with great expectations for AEK, as they signed Rodolfo Arruabarrena, Brazilian legend Rivaldo, Jürgen Macho, Tam Nsaliwa and Ismael Blanco. On the other hand, great departures took place with Dionysis Chiotis, Vangelis Moras, Bruno Cirillo, Vladan Ivić and Vasilios Lakis leaving the club.

In the Champions League third qualifying round, AEK were drawn with Sevilla and were eliminated. AEK continued in the UEFA Cup and were drawn against Red Bull Salzburg and qualified to the group stage. They were placed alongside Villarreal, Fiorentina, Mladá Boleslav and Elfsborg, finishing third in the group.

Nevertheless, AEK started the season well and were in contention for the league title. On 3 February, Olympiacos lost to Apollon Kalamarias with 1–0, with the player of Apollon, Roman Wallner having been fielded an ineligible, with the red and whites filing an objection for the match. In the Cup, AEK were eliminated by Skoda Xanthi, which resulted in the sacking of Serra Ferrer. The assistant of Ferrer, Nikos Kostenoglou replaced him as a caretaker.

the round of 32 of the UEFA Cup, AEK were drawn with Getafe and were eliminated.

In the league AEK closed the gap at the top and had an impressive run in the last ten games of the league, during which they had two 4–0 wins against Olympiacos at home and PAOK away. However, AEK finished second behind Olympiacos, who also won the "Wallner-case". This meant that the team had to compete in the play-offs, where they faced disastrous results and finished second, missing the opportunity to compete in the Champions League of the following season. Ismael Blanco was the league's top scorer with 19 goals.

=== 2008–09 season ===
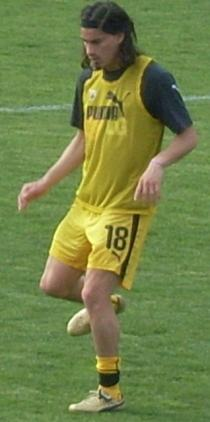
Ismael Blanco

Georgios Donis was appointed as manager of AEK. There were big changes in the squad with Daniel Majstorović, Ignacio Scocco, Sebastián Saja, Juanfran, Angelos Basinas, Sotirios Kyrgiakos, and Rafik Djebbour arriving at the club. Among the departures were those of three captains, Akis Zikos, Traianos Dellas and Nikos Liberopoulos, Rivaldo, Sokratis Papastathopoulos, Rodolfo Arruabarrena, Panagiotis Kone, Dániel Tőzsér and Júlio César.

The season did not start well, as AEK failed to overcome Omonia in the second qualifying round of the UEFA Cup, resulting in their elimination from European competitions. A series of poor performances and results left the team in a difficult situation, with Nikolaidis leaving due to disappointing results and a lengthy clash with the ultras. The presidency was temporarily taken by Nikos Koulis and Takis Kannellopoulos. A series of disappointing results continued and the administration asked for the resignation of Donis. Koulis and Kanellopoulos appointed Dušan Bajević as manager for the third time. Bajević brought some stability to the team's performances, culminating in AEK's progression to the Cup final against Olympiacos. Although AEK took an early 2–0 lead and later a 3–2 lead, the match ended in a 4–4 draw and the winner would be decided in a penalty shootout in which they lost 14–15 due to three missed penalties. In the league AEK finished fourth, qualifying for the play-offs. There, they secured the second place and would compete in the newly founded Europa League. Ismael Blanco finished the season with a total 23 goals, earning him his second consecutive title of the league's top scorer, while he also was the top scorer of the Cup.

== Financial struggle and relegation (2009–2013) ==
Honours won: Greek Cup: 1 (2010–11)

Runners-up: –

=== 2009–10 season ===
Grigoris Makos

Lineup against Benfica (2010-01-09)

During the summer transfer period AEK signed Kostas Manolas, Grigoris Makos, Nikolaos Karabelas, Leonardo, Roger Guerreiro and Carlos Araujo. Most important departures included Jürgen Macho, Stefano Sorrentino, Agustín Pelletieri, Vasilios Pliatsikas and Sotirios Kyrgiakos.

In the Europa League play-off round they eliminated Vaslui and qualified for the group stage. They were placed in a group with Benfica, Everton and BATE Borisov, AEK secured only a 1–0 victory against Benfica and gathered a total of four points, finishing last.

On top of that, AEK were eliminated in the fourth round of the Cup, after losing 0–1 to second division side, Thrasyvoulos.

In the league they finished fourth and qualified for the play-offs, where they secured the second place.

=== 2010–11 season ===
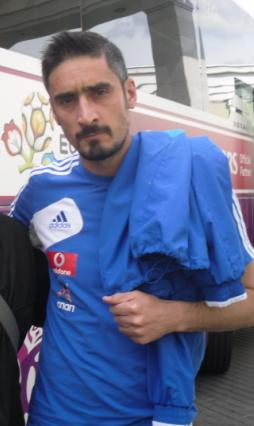
Nikos Liberopoulos

Lineup against Atromitos (2011-04-30)

In the summer transfer period AEK chose to sign experienced players with the return of the captains, Nikos Liberopoulos and Traianos Dellas and the signing of Christos Patsatzoglou and Papa Bouba Diop. Daniel Majstorović, Georgios Alexopoulos, Juanfran and Tam Nsaliwa were among the departures.

AEK reached the Europa League play-off round, overcoming Dundee United, amid strange events surrounding the second leg, which took place at Karaiskakis Stadium without supporters of AEK. In the group stage, they were drawn against Zenit Saint Petersburg, Anderlecht and Hajduk Split. In the league AEK lost twice and drew once in their four first matches. Bajević resigned after a 3–1 defeat against Olympiacos Volos. The manager of the youth team, Bledar Kola was appointed as a caretaker until Manolo Jiménez was appointed.

The Spaniard started with an impressive 4–0 away victory against Aris and the team's results were immediately improved and AEK won both derby matches with 1–0 victories over Panathinaikos and Olympiacos and a 4–0 win over PAOK.

In the Cup, AEK eliminated AEL, Panathinaikos and PAOK, reaching the final against Atromitos, whom they defeated 3–0 to claim the Cup. Ismael Blanco finished as the top scorer of the tournament with 4 goals.

In the league, AEK were affected by the rotation between league and Cup matches and thus finished third as well.

=== 2011–12 season ===
The departures of Ignacio Scocco, Sebastián Saja, Papa Bouba Diop and Ismael Blanco greatly weakened the squad. However, AEK signed Eiður Guðjohnsen, José Carlos, Dimitrios Konstantopoulos and Fabián Vargas, while Steve Leo Beleck and Cala were signed on loan.

In the Europa League play-off round, AEK eliminated Dinamo Tbilisi. In the group stage, AEK were drawn against Anderlecht, Lokomotiv Moscow and Sturm Graz, where they managed a third-place finish. Jiménez's contract was terminated following heavy defeats in the Europa League and against PAOK Former player and manager Nikos Kostenoglou agreed to return as AEK manager. During the winter transfer period AEK were weakened with the departure of Cala.

In the Cup AEK were eliminated by PAOK in a single match in the round of 16. Despite the problems, the club qualified for the play–offs and competed for the Champions League qualification slot, but lost it in the final fixture.

=== 2012–13 season ===
Owing to the growing financial problems AEK did not participate in the Europa League, as they failed to meet the licensing requirements. Furthermore, both of the club's captains, Traianos Dellas and Nikos Liberopoulos, decided to retire. In the face of this crisis, AEK legend, Thomas Mavros took over the presidency of the club and appointed Vangelis Vlachos as the new manager. The squad was severely weakened as Viktor Klonaridis, Grigoris Makos and Leonardo were sold, while Nikolaos Georgeas, Pantelis Kafes, Fabián Vargas, Kostas Manolas, Eiður Guðjohnsen and Nikolaos Karabelas were released, since the club was not able to bear the weight of their contracts. Summer transfers were predominantly young Greek players. Notable additions were Georgios Katidis and Miguel Cordero.

The club performed badly and was constantly in the relegation zone. As a result, Vlachos was sacked and assistant Manolis Papadopoulos took charge until a replacement was found. Mavros, who disagreed with the decision, resigned from the club's presidency. Vlachos was replaced by Ewald Lienen. The winter transfer period was marked by the departure of Panagiotis Lagos and Giannis Kontoes. However, the additions of Antonis Petropoulos, Pavlos Mitropoulos, Anastasios Tsoumagas and Dimitrios Anakoglou helped the team improve their performance and rise from the relegation zone. After a six-match unbeaten streak, AEK regained hope of avoiding relegation. An away defeat at the hands of PAS Giannina resulted in Lienen being sacked. AEK appointed their former player, Traianos Dellas as manager in an attempt to avoid relegation. AEK wanted 3 points in the last 2 matchdays in order to keep themselves in the division. The first was a crowded home match against Panthrakikos, Mavroudis Bougaidis scored an own goal in the last minutes, with the ultras invading the pitch. As a result, the match was awarded 0–3 against AEK, and they were deducted three points from the championship. AEK appealed and in the hope of having the points restored, played in the last match against Atromitos away from home, where they lost 1–0 after conceding a last-minute goal, which resulted in the relegation of the club.

== Rebirth and return to titles (2013–2018) ==
Honours won: Super League Greece: 1 (2017–18), Greek Cup: 1 (2015–16), Football League (South Division) (2014–15), Football League 2 (6th Group) (2013–14)

Runners-up: Greek Cup: 2 (2016–17, 2017–18)

=== 2013–14 season ===
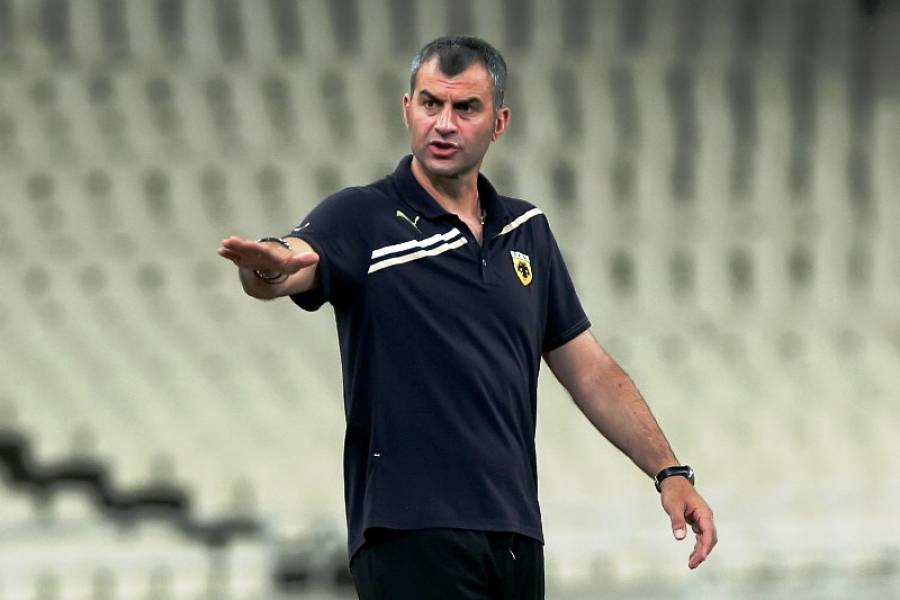
Traianos Dellas

Dimitris Melissanidis became the new owner of AEK. After the relegation of AEK to the second division, the previous administration had decided to declare the club bankrupt in order to be released of their debts. Thus, AEK became an amateur club and was relegated to the third division instead of the second. Melissanidis presented the project of a new stadium for the club, Agia Sophia Stadium. Dellas remained on the bench and the roster was filled with young footballers, Nikolaos Georgeas and Bruno Cirillo returned, while Miguel Cordero and Dimitrios Anakoglou among others, remained. The most notable signings included Vasilios Rovas, Adam Tzanetopoulos, Vangelis Platellas, Alexandre D'Acol and Ivan Brečević.

AEK easily won the promotion from Group 6 of the Football League 2, with only one loss to their record. However, they failed to win the Football League 2 Cup, after being knocked out in the semi-finals by Agrotikos Asteras, losing 2–0 after extra time.

=== 2014–15 season ===
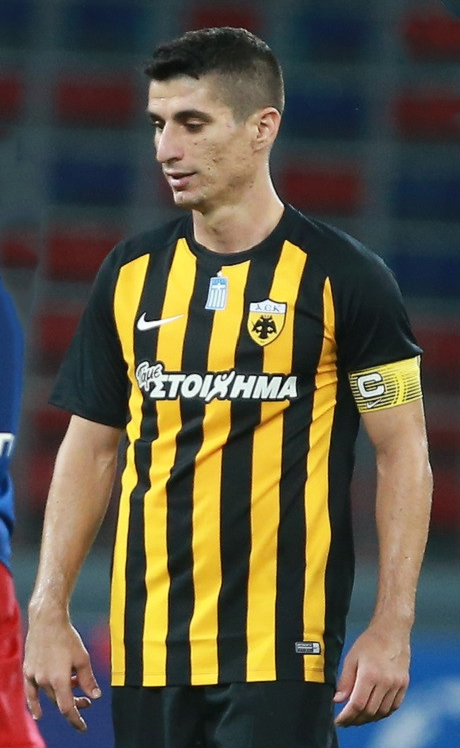
Petros Mantalos

In the summer of 2014 AEK made signings from first division teams with Petros Mantalos, Giannis Anestis, Vasilios Lampropoulos, Christos Aravidis, Dimitrios Kolovetsios, Michalis Bakakis and Helder Barbosa. During the winter, Jakob Johansson was signed.

The team went through the league unbeaten until the play-offs. The highlight of the season was the quarter-final of the Cup against Olympiacos, which AEK lost at home by a late goal after a 1–1 draw away. The match was abandoned after an invasion by ultras shortly after the goal with the Olympiacos manager Vítor Pereira and Pajtim Kasami making offensive gestures at the stands. In the play-offs, the team lost its consistency and its unbeaten streak ended, but nevertheless were promoted to the Super League.

=== 2015–16 season ===
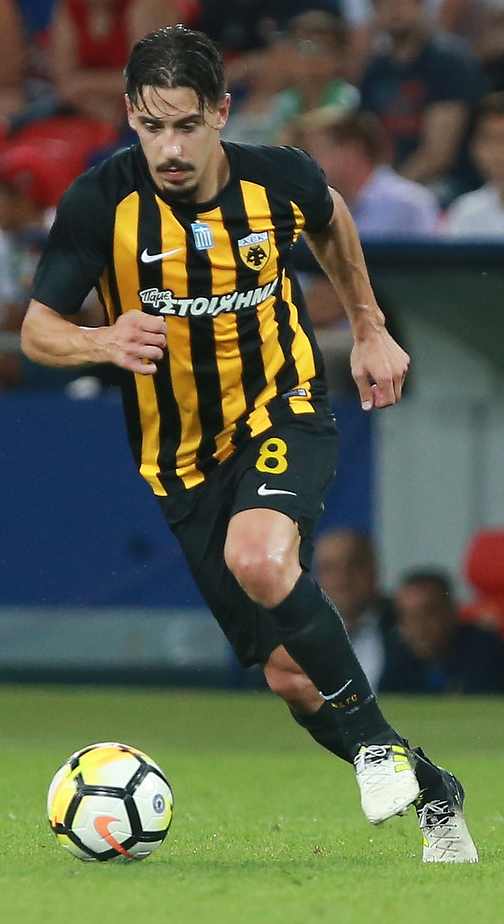
André Simões

AEK finally returned to the Super League after two years of absence. The major signings were André Simões Rodrigo Galo, Ronald Vargas, Dídac Vilà and Diego Buonanotte, while Rafik Djebbour returned after 4 years.

AEK started the championship well, but after a 4–0 defeat from Olympiacos, which resulted in Dellas resigning after two and a half years at the club and with the U20 manager, Stelios Manolas replacing him until a new manager was found. Gus Poyet was appointed until the end of the season. The club was strengthened in January with the transfer of Tomáš Pekhart.

The Uruguayan managed to change the atmosphere and won the derbies, against Olympiacos, PAOK and Panathinaikos with 1–0 at home and Vargas scoring in each match. AEK also enjoyed a good Cup campaign winning all their matches and reaching the semi-final before Poyet was sacked due to conflicts with Melissanidis. Manolas was appointed as interim manager again until the end of the season, qualifying for the Cup final, where AEK beat Olympiacos with 2–1 and lifted the trophy. Manolas did not sit on the bench again due to overwork, with his assistant, Nikos Panagiotaras, sitting in his place.

At the league play–offs they did not capitalise on their form in the Cup and, facing fatigue, finished third, qualifying for the Europa League, returning in European competition after 5 years.

Lineup against Olympiacos (2016-05-17)

=== 2016–17 season ===
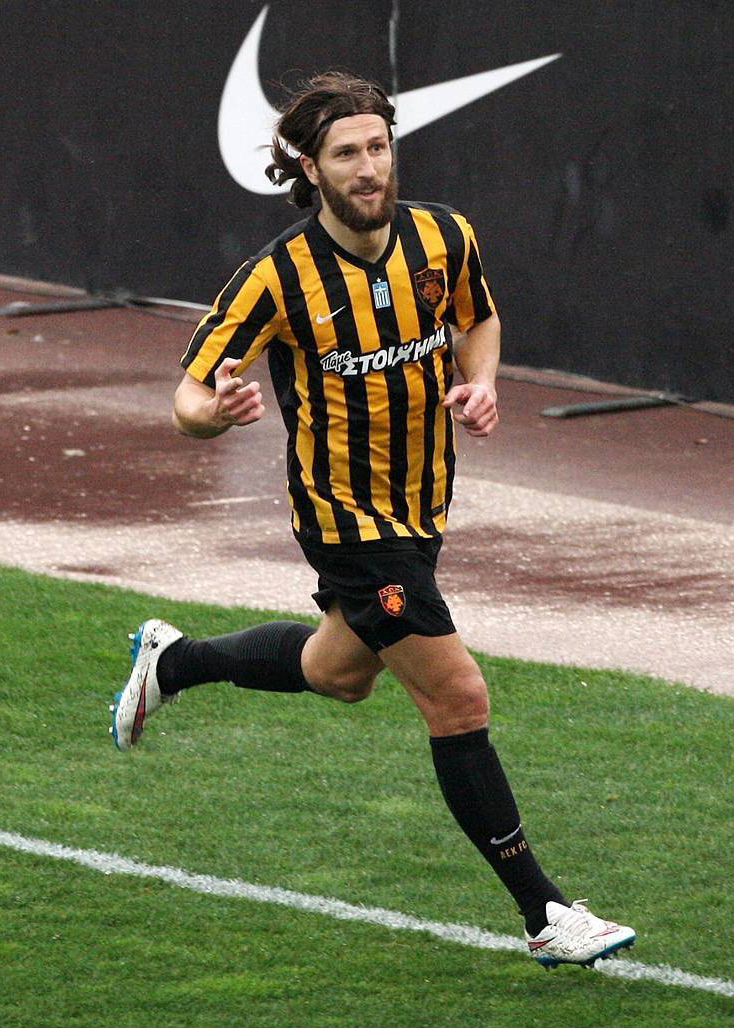
Dmytro Chyhrynskyi

AEK appointed Temur Ketsbaia as their new manager. The club signed Hugo Almeida, Patito Rodríguez, Joleon Lescott, Vasilis Barkas, Lazaros Christodoulopoulos, Anastasios Bakasetas and Dmytro Chyhrynskyi. On the other side, Miguel Cordero, Diego Buonanotte, and Helder Barbosa left the club.

This season marked the club's return to European competitions, facing Saint-Étienne in the third qualifying round of the Europa League, where after a 0–0 in France, they were narrowly eliminated by losing 0–1 in Greece.

AEK did not start the season well and after a 3–0 away loss to Olympiacos, Ketsbaia was sacked. Immediately after the removal of Ketsbaia, Jose Morais was appointed, with the aim of implementing an attacking style of football. As the season progressed the performances deteriorated with AEK staying far behind in the standings. Furthermore, Joleon Lescott was released from the club, with Ognjen Vranješ arriving in his place during the winter transfer period, while Vangelis Platellas also left. However, AEK continued their poor performances and Morais resigned in January. Manolo Jiménez returned to the club's bench after six years. AEK proceeded with the loan of Sergio Araujo. AEK improved their performances and managed to cover the lost ground, finishing at the fourth place and advanced to the play-offs.

In the Cup, AEK reached the semi-finals, where they faced Olympiacos and won 2–1 away, with the rematch at home becoming a thriller after the red and whites took the lead, in a match that ended with Almeida playing as goalkeeper in the stoppage time, with AEK advancing on away goals. In the final, AEK faced PAOK at Panthessaliko Stadium, where wild incidents between the ultras of the clubs took place. In the match, AEK were defeated by 2–1, with PAOK scoring the final goal from an offside position and lost the trophy. In the play-offs, AEK secured first place on the final matchday, which led to qualification for the Champions League the following season.

=== 2017–18 season ===
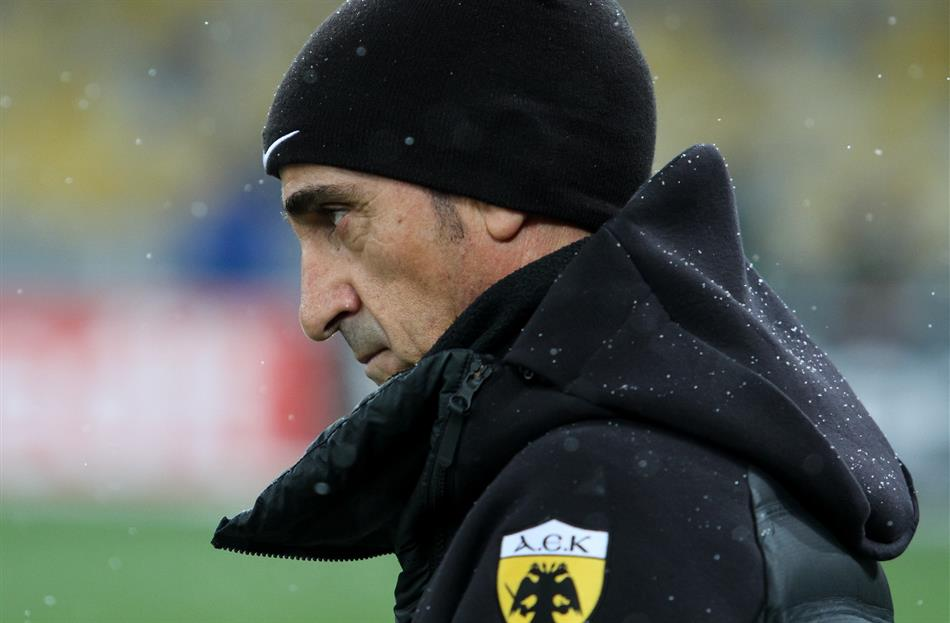
Manolo Jiménez

Lineup against Club Brugge (2017-08-24)

AEK kept their main squad and were strengthened with Hélder Lopes, Marko Livaja and Panagiotis Kone. On the contrary, Dimitrios Kolovetsios, Dídac Vilà, Ronald Vargas and Christos Aravidis departed.

In the third qualifying round of the Champions League, AEK faced CSKA Moscow and were eliminated, continuing in the play-off round of the Europa League. There, they eliminated Club Brugge and returned to the group stage of the Europa League, where they were drawn with Milan, Rijeka and Austria Wien, finishing second and advanced to the knockout stage. In the round of 32, they faced Dynamo Kyiv and were eliminated on away goals.

In the winter transfer period, AEK signed Masoud Shojaei and Niklas Hult. In February, PAOK were punished with a 3-point deduction and a home ban against AEK, due to the suspension of their home game against Olympiacos. In the midnight before the match, the verdict of PAOK's appeal came out returning the points to the club and lifting their home ban. Under these conditions, AEK played against PAOK and at the 90th minute, Varela scored a goal with Maurício interfering with the play from an offside position. The referee initially counted the goal, but later called it off, resulting in the major shareholder of PAOK, Ivan Savvidis storming onto the pitch and attacking the referee, with a revolver in his belt. The referee interrupted the match and later returned to the pitch with the players of PAOK to continue the match with the score at 1–0, but the yellow-blacks refused to come out and the match was abandoned. The case was transferred to courts, where AEK were vindicated and were awarded the match. AEK were crowned champions and celebrated at their under-construction stadium.

In the Cup, AEK reached the final for the third consecutive year, where they faced PAOK, for the second consecutive year and lost 2–0, missing out on a domestic double.

== Transitional years (2018–2022) ==
Honours won: —

Runners-up: Greek Cup: 2 (2018–19, 2019–20)

=== 2018–19 season ===
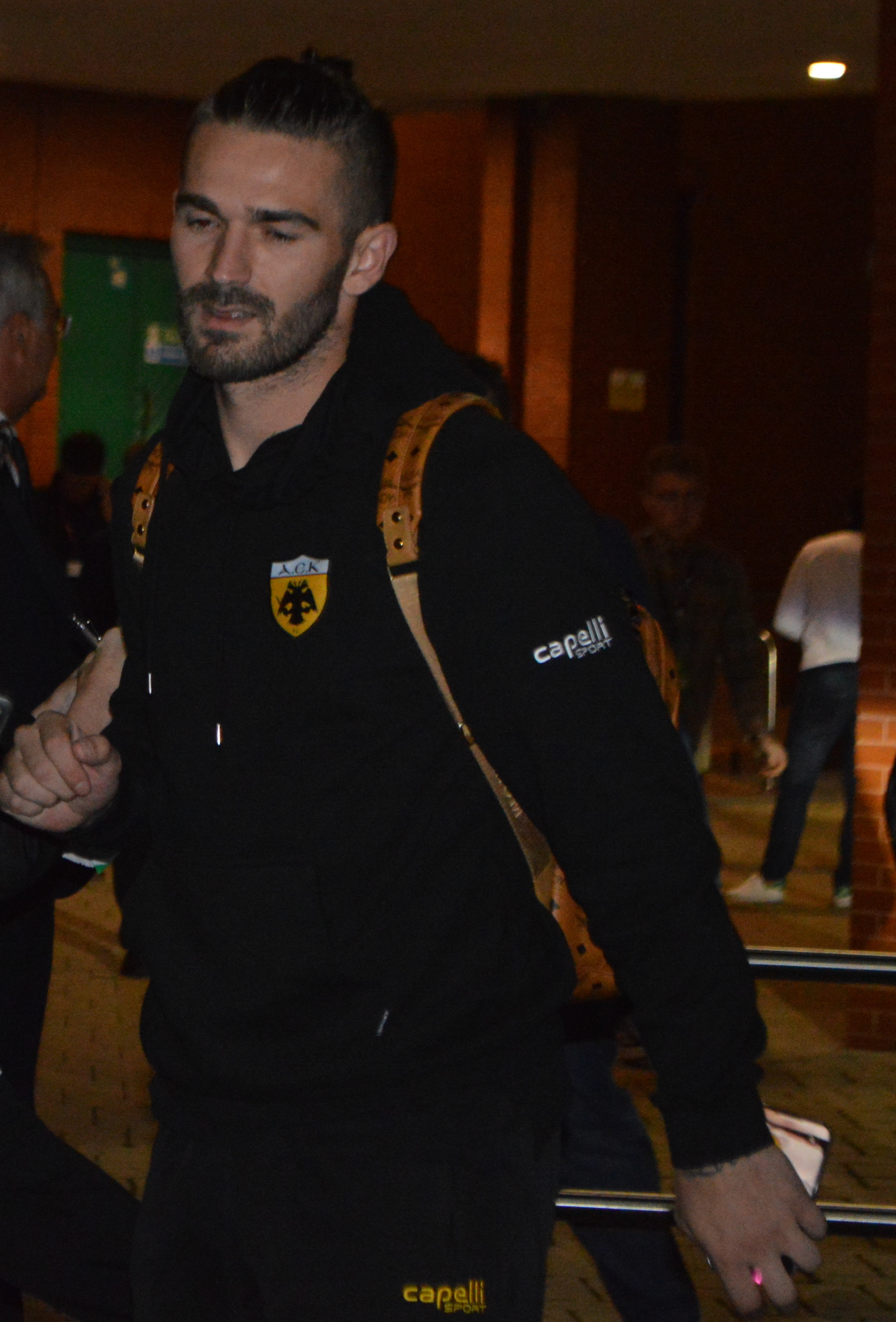
Marko Livaja

Lineup against MOL Vidi (2018-08-28)

AEK aimed to return to the group stage of the Champions League, however the previous season's team began to break up. The decision of Manolo Jiménez not to renew his contract, led to his replacement by Marinos Ouzounidis. Giannis Anestis, Ognjen Vranješ, Jakob Johansson and Lazaros Christodoulopoulos departed. On the other hand, AEK proceeded with the loans of Ezequiel Ponce, Marios Oikonomou, Alef and Lucas Boyé.

In the Champions League qualifiers AEK successfully reached the group stage, eliminating Celtic and MOL Vidi, making a domestic record of a 14-game unbeaten streak in the UEFA competitions. They were drawn alongside Bayern Munich, Benfica and Ajax, where AEK lost all their matches and finished last. In the league, AEK started well, but an away defeat to PAOK and a three-point deduction after a home draw with Olympiacos left them behind in the title race. In the winter transfer period AEK signed Nenad Krstičić. Ouzounidis, unable to restore them to the title race, resigned in February. Ouzounidis was replaced by Jiménez, but the change did not improve the performance of AEK who finished third.

In the Cup, they again reached the final, where they faced PAOK for a third consecutive year and as in the previous season's final lost 1–0.

=== 2019–20 season ===
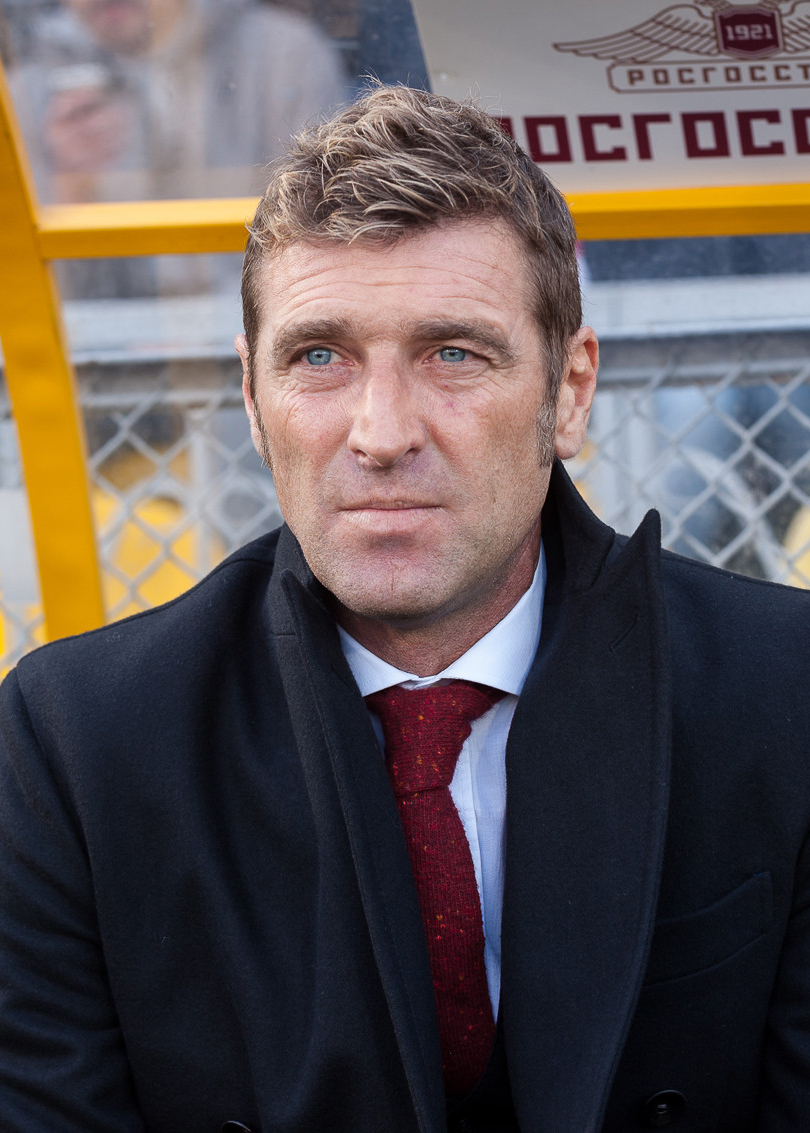
Massimo Carrera

In the summer of 2019, the club, in search of a replacement for Manolo Jiménez, appointed Miguel Cardoso. Transfers included the return of Ognjen Vranješ, while Daniele Verde and Nélson Oliveira also arrived. Important players, such as Vasilios Lampropoulos, Rodrigo Galo and Anastasios Bakasetas departed, while the loans of Alef, Lucas Boyé and Ezequiel Ponce expired.

In the third qualifying round of the Europa League, AEK eliminated Universitatea Craiova and in the play-offs they faced Trabzonspor. After a heavy 1–3 home defeat, followed by another defeat against Xanthi, Cardoso was sacked. The Portuguese was replaced with the manager of the U19 team, Nikos Kostenoglou, in his third spell at the club. In the rematch against Trabzonspor, AEK had a great performance and won by 0–2, losing qualification on away goals. With Kostenoglou, the team had a temporary boost in their performance, but could not follow their contenders in the title race. Thus, the administration dismissed the Greek manager. The new manager was Massimo Carrera. The club were strengthened with the loans of Damian Szymański and Sergio Araujo, in his third spell at the club.

AEK were in good form, finishing third before the start of the play-offs. During that period the COVID-19 pandemic began, causing disruption to all sporting activities for about 3 months. The restart in early June found AEK competing in the play-offs affected by the interruption and lost the opportunity to finish second in a match where PAOK had knowingly played with unreviewed health cards of their footballers, which would have resulted in the match being awarded to AEK if the club had lodged an objection.

In the Cup, AEK easily passed through Asteras Tripolis in the round of 16 and Panetolikos in the quarter-finals. In the semi-finals, they faced Aris and after a 2–1 win in the first at home, went to Kleanthis Vikelidis Stadium, where AEK secured qualification after a 2–2 draw after extra time. Thus, the yellow-blacks reached the final for the fifth consecutive year facing Olympiacos. After a series of postponements the match took place in September at Panthessaliko Stadium. Due to the delay, the clubs had to compete without the players acquired from the 2020 summer transfer period, by decision of the UEFA. In the match, AEK were defeated 1–0 by an inadequate Olympiacos, losing their fourth consecutive final.

=== 2020–21 season ===
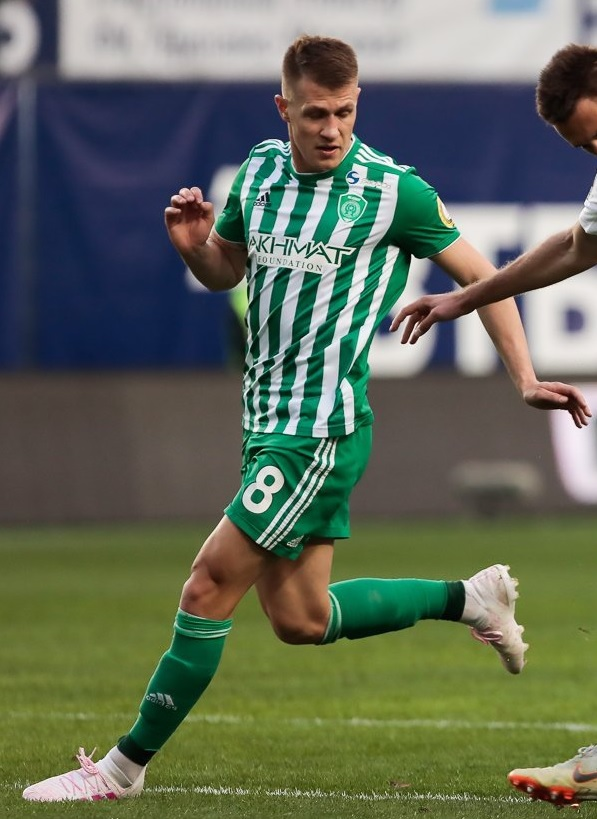
Damian Szymański

Lineup against Wolfsburg (2020-10-01)

The season started for the first time in three years with the same manager in charge. Among the summer transfers, the permanent signing of Damian Szymański and the signings of Ionuț Nedelcearu, Yevhen Shakhov, Levi García, Muamer Tanković and Karim Ansarifard. On the other hand, Vasilis Barkas, Marios Oikonomou, Niklas Hult, Daniele Verde and Victor Klonaridis departed, while Ognjen Vranješ and Sergio Araujo once again did not remain permanently at the club. It was also the season that followed the interruption due to the COVID-19 pandemic, which resulted in no actual pre-season preparation during summer, while all of the matches were played in front of empty stands.

The draw for the third qualifying round of the Europa League brought AEK against St. Gallen. Due to a busy schedule and the consequences of the pandemic, the qualifying and play-off rounds were played as single-leg ties. Thus, at Kybunpark, AEK prevailed 1–0 and qualified in the play-off round, where they faced Wolfsburg at the Olympic Stadium and won by 2–1 with a comeback, earning a place at the group stage. There, they were drawn alongside Braga, Leicester City and Zorya Luhansk, where their European campaign ended poorly, as they finished last with only 1 win.

AEK were going well in the league, but the team's performance decreased after five players were diagnosed with COVID-19. A series of poor performances led to the termination of Carrera's contract. The Italian was replaced with Manolo Jiménez in his fourth spell at AEK. During the winter transfer period, Livaja departed, after his mutual contract termination. Initially, the Spaniard seemed to improve the team's performances, but yet again the team collapsed.

In the Cup, after two expected but not easy qualifications against Apollon Smyrnis and Volos, they faced another elimination by PAOK in the semi-finals. The regular season ended with the team struggling to finish third. The collapse of the team resulted in AEK facing embarrassing defeats in the play-offs, which brought them close to the absence from the European competitions, but an away win against Panathinaikos secured a fourth-place finish.

=== 2021–22 season ===
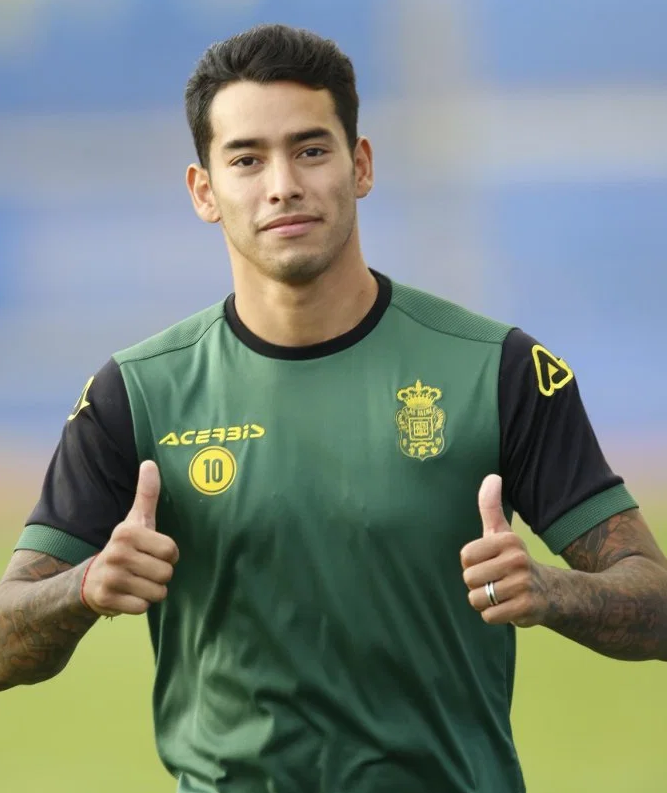
Sergio Araujo

After a search for a new manager, Vladan Milojević was appointed. Several transfers were made, with the permanent return of Ognjen Vranješ and Sergio Araujo, while players such as Cican Stanković, Georgios Tzavellas, Lazaros Rota, Ehsan Hajsafi, Milad Mohammadi, Nordin Amrabat and Steven Zuber joined the club. Players with great contribution, such as Dmytro Chyhrynskyi, Hélder Lopes and Nélson Oliveira departed.

AEK started in the second qualifying round of the UEFA Europa Conference League, facing Velež Mostar. In the first leg at Sarajevo, despite taking the lead early on, they lost 2–1. Since UEFA abolished the away goals rule, the yellow-blacks needed two goals to qualify at the normal time. The rematch in Athens was dominated by AEK, who in the stoppage time made the 1–0, taking the match to extra time and eventually to the penalty shootout, where they lost 2–3, suffering one of their heaviest European eliminations.

The season already started badly and despite the quality roster, they lacked the mentality to compete for the title. The first negative results raised doubts within the administration about the Serbian manager and in October his contract was terminated. AEK found themselves again looking for a manager in mid-season. The administration appointed the promising Argiris Giannikis. The change of manager initially brought some positive results, but they quickly fell apart as the team lacked many of the qualities required to become title contenders.

In the Cup, AEK passed through A.E. Kifisia for the round of 16, but afterwards they were eliminated by PAOK after conceding two goals in the stoppage time of the second leg. After a series of bad results, a 3–0 away to Panathinaikos, brought an end to Giannikis' tenure at AEK. The manager of the B team, Sokratis Ofrydopoulos, took charge as a caretaker in order to secure a place in UEFA competitions, while Grzegorz Krychowiak arrived to compete in the play-offs.

AEK entered the play-offs in fourth place and after a run of consecutive matches without a win, they eventually failed to achieve their goal after an away 3–2 defeat with a comeback by Aris on the penultimate matchday.

== Return to Nea Filadelfeia (2022–2024) ==
Honours won: Super League Greece: 1 (2022–23), Greek Cup: 1 (2022–23)

Runners-up: Super League Greece (2023–24)

=== 2022–23 season ===
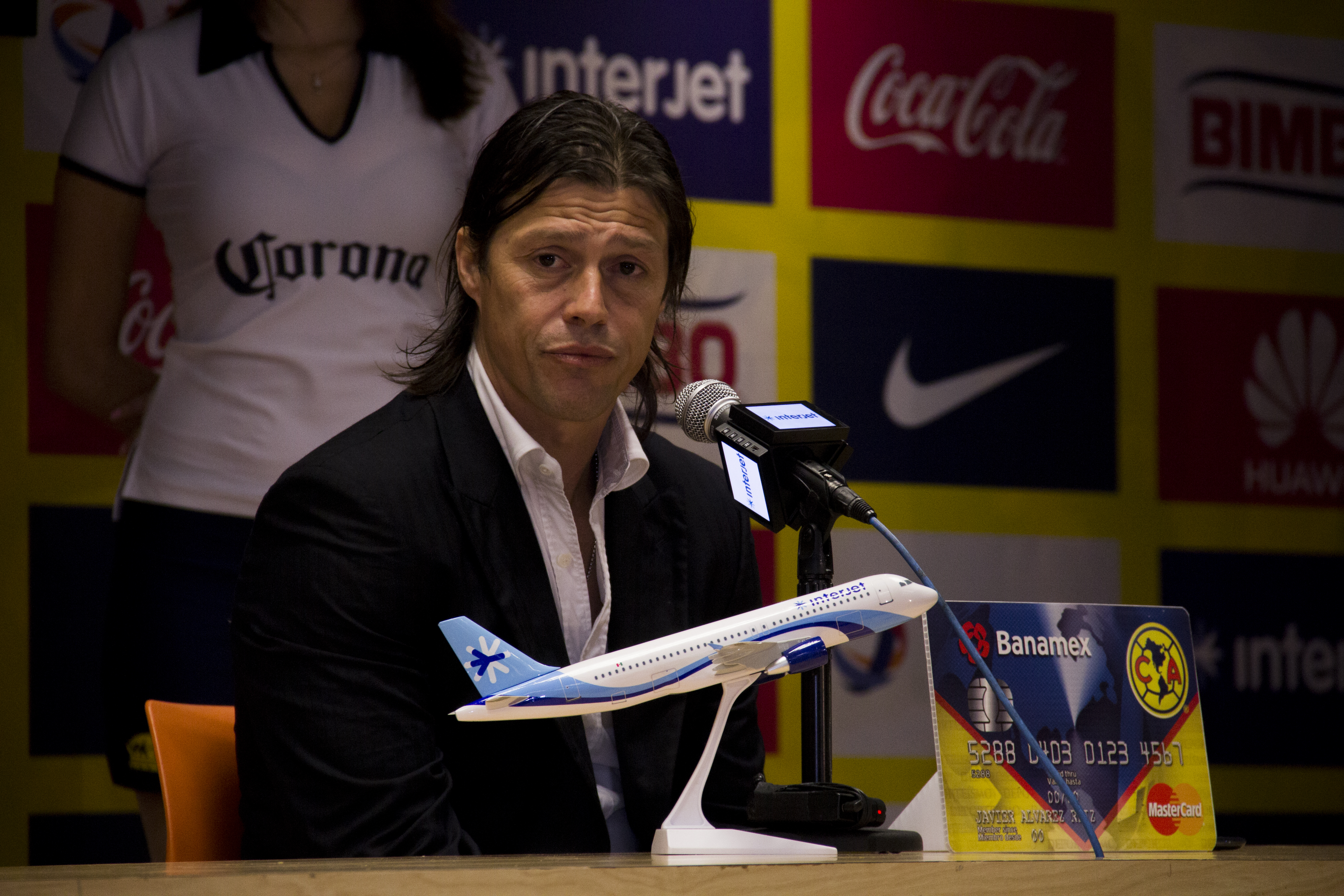
Matías Almeyda

Lineup against PAOK (2023-05-24)

The previous season ended with AEK failing to qualify for any European competition. Matías Almeyda was appointed manager. Players such as Domagoj Vida, Harold Moukoudi, Djibril Sidibé, Jens Jønsson, Mijat Gaćinović and Niclas Eliasson arrived, while Orbelín Pineda joined on loan. André Simões left the club after seven years.

From early in the season, AEK began to show signs of the team that Almeyda was building. They played with dominance, pressing their opponents all over the pitch and recovering the ball immediately after losing possession. Furthermore, with the completion of Agia Sophia Stadium, AEK entered their new home, which boosted the team's performances. As the season progressed, they were in second place behind Panathinaikos, but the performances of the two teams suggested that the gap was recoverable. On 5 February, AEK faced Atromitos at Peristeri Stadium, where one of the goalposts was found to be shorter than required. After unsuccessful attempts by the hosts to resolve the issue, the match was not played and the case was taken to the courts. Despite the regulation, Atromitos were absolved of any responsibility and the match was ordered to be replayed. Nevertheless, AEK won the match and entered the play-offs having reduced the gap to Panathinaikos to just two points. The title was decided on the penultimate matchday, when AEK defeated Aris and Panathinaikos lost to Olympiacos. AEK were therefore crowned champions, with the trophy presentation taking place inside their new stadium.

AEK comfortably progressed past PAS Giannina, A.E. Kifisia and Panserraikos. In the semi-finals they eliminated Olympiacos with an emphatic 3–0 at home and a 2–1 defeat away. In the final, they faced PAOK. After a series of disputes and changes regarding the venue, AEK dominated the match, but after Rota was sent off, they were forced into a more defensive role. Nevertheless, they managed to score through Moukoudi, while in the final minutes, Fernandes sealed the victory with a solo goal, securing AEK's third domestic double.

=== 2023–24 season ===
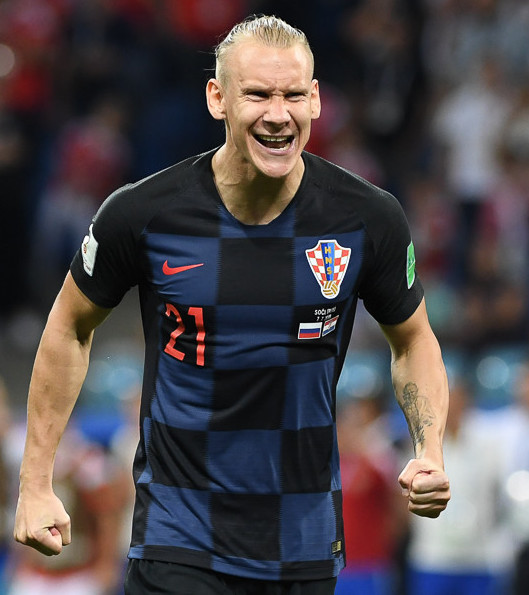
Domagoj Vida

Lineup against Brighton (2023-09-21)

In the summer of 2023, Almeyda decided to retain the squad that had won the double. Georgios Tzavellas departed the club, while Stavros Pilios, Alexander Callens and Ezequiel Ponce were acquired.

In the third qualifying round of the Champions League, AEK were drawn against Dinamo Zagreb. On the eve of the first leg in Nea Filadelfeia, around 100 ultras of the Croatian team, joined by Greek ultras, were involved in clashes outside the stadium, which resulted in the murder of an AEK supporter. UEFA decided to postpone the match, which was moved as the second leg of the tie. Thus, at Stadion Maksimir AEK won by 1–2, with a late comeback, while in the rematch, they again fell behind, but managed to equalize at 2–2 and advance to the next round. In the following round they faced Royal Antwerp and were eliminated after losing both legs. In the group stage of the Europa League they were drawn with Ajax, Marseille and Brighton & Hove Albion and eventually missed out on qualification on the final matchday.

AEK entered the Cup in the round of 16, where they were eliminated by Aris after two draws and a 4–2 defeat on penalties.

In the league, AEK displayed strong performances, especially in the derbies, but eventually entered the play-offs in second place. There, they moved to the top of the standings, but two consecutive defeats against PAOK and Olympiacos gave the advantage to the club of Thessaloniki. On the final matchday, AEK lost the title despite defeating Lamia, as PAOK also won their match and were crowned champions.

== The Marios Iliopoulos era (2024–present) ==
Honours won: Super League Greece: 1 (2025–26)

Runners-up: ―

=== 2024–25 season ===
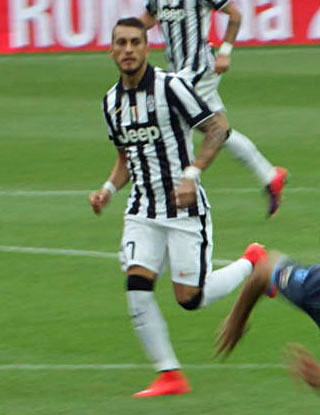
Roberto Pereyra

On 10 June 2024, Dimitris Melissanidis announced his departure from the ownership of the club after 11 years, handing it over to Marios Iliopoulos. AEK made several signings, including Thomas Strakosha, Roberto Pereyra, Erik Lamela, Aboubakary Koïta and Anthony Martial. Among the departures were those of Georgios Athanasiadis, Djibril Sidibé, Ezequiel Ponce and Sergio Araujo. Two months later, Iliopoulos reorganized the football department by hiring Javier Ribalta as its director.

AEK began their campaign in the Conference League, where they comfortably eliminated Inter Club d'Escaldes, while in the following round they suffered a surprise elimination by Noah, which raised the first doubts about Almeyda.

AEK were suffering from recurring injuries to key players, while the way they were treated by referees also affected the team. These issues negatively affected Almeyda's high-intensity style of play. The away 4–1 defeat against Olympiacos raised further doubts about Almeyda, as it proved that his playing style was no longer as effective as before. Furthermore, the differences between Almeyda and Ribalta became evident during the winter transfer window, when Galanopoulos, Amrabat, Zuber and Levi García departed, but the club made no signing.

As in the previous season, AEK entered the Cup in the round of 16, facing Aris. This time they managed to overcome their opponent with a 1–0 win in Athens and a 1–1 draw in Thessaloniki. In the quarter-finals, they faced PAOK, where they won the first leg 1–0 at home and in the rematch they secured qualification in extra time after a 1–1 draw. In the semi-finals, AEK played against Olympiacos and suffered a heavy elimination after a 6–0 defeat at Piraeus and a 2–0 win at Nea Filadelfeia.

AEK entered the play-offs in a significant decline in both form and confidence following the negative results against Olympiacos. Thus, despite entering the play-offs in second place, AEK finished fourth, losing all six matches of the round. After the end of the season, Almeyda's contract with the club was terminated.

=== 2025–26 season ===
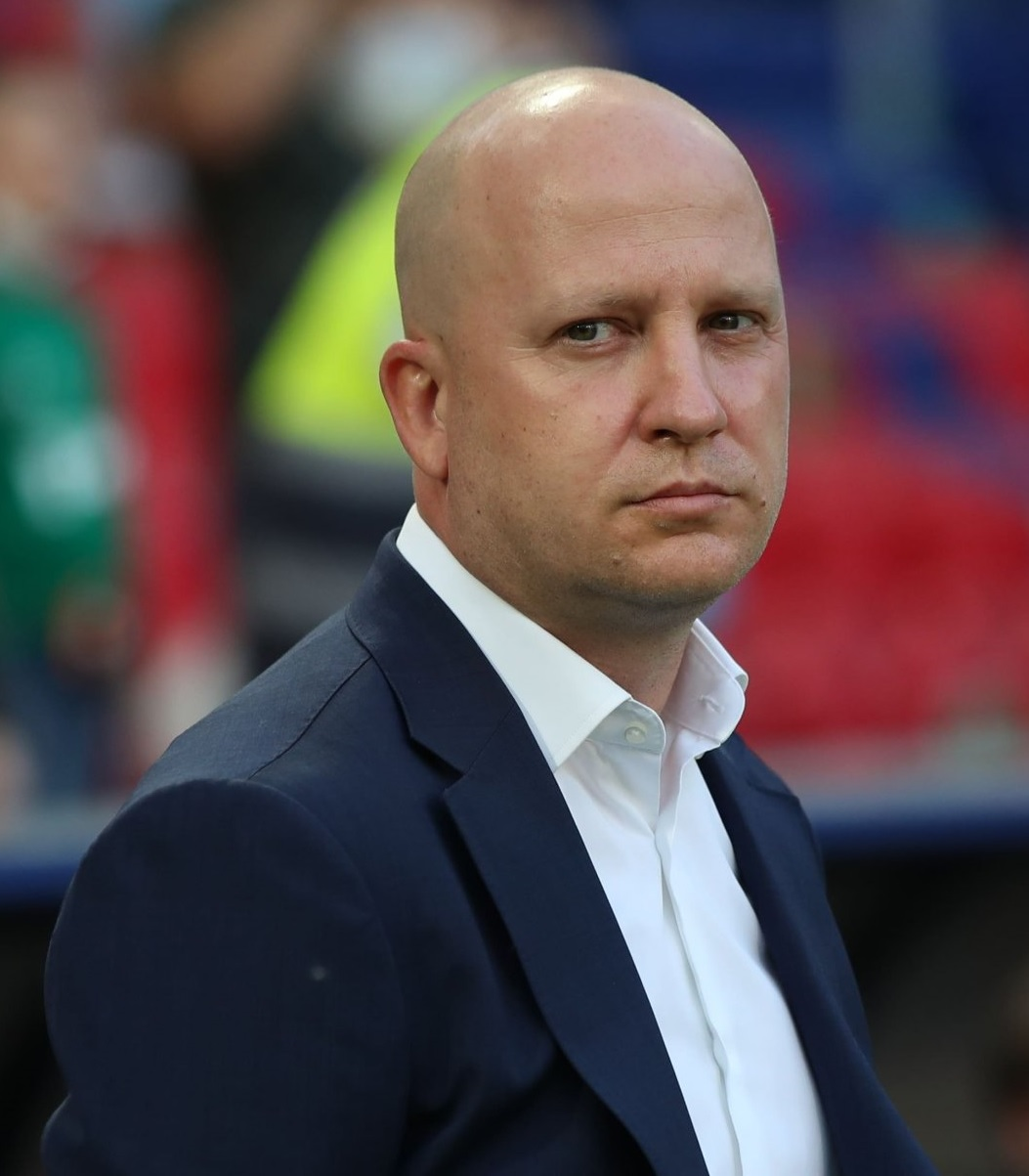
Marko Nikolić

Lineup against Fiorentina (2025-11-27)

^{ET}Extra time taken into account.

^{PEN}Extra time taken into account and went to penalty shoot-out.

== Owner, chairman and manager history ==
Period	Shareholder(s)	Chairman	Period	Manager	Period
1924–1928	—	(Greece) Konstantinos Spanoudis	1924–04–13; 1933	—	
1928–1931	—	(Greece) Konstantinos Spanoudis	1924–04–13; 1933	(Hungary) Schweng	1928; 1931
1931–1932	—	(Greece) Konstantinos Spanoudis	1924–04–13; 1933	(Hungary) Rauchmal	1931; 1932
1932–1933	—	(Greece) Konstantinos Spanoudis	1924–04–13; 1933	(Greece) Asderis	1932; 1933
1933–1936	—	(Greece) Konstantinos Konstantaras	1933; 1936	(Greece) Negrepontis	1933; 1936
1936–1937	—	(Greece) Konstantinos Zarifis	1936; 1937	(Greece) Asderis	1936; 1937
1937–1939	—	(Greece) Konstantinos Theofanidis	1937; 1939	(Greece) Negrepontis	1937; 1948
1939–1940	—	(Greece) Konstantinos Chrysopoulos	1939; 1940	(Greece) Negrepontis	1937; 1948
1940	—	(Greece) Ioannis Chrysafidis	1940	(Greece) Negrepontis	1937; 1948
1940–1943	—	—		(Greece) Negrepontis	1937; 1948
1943–1946	—	(Greece) Emilios Ionas	1943; 1946–03	(Greece) Negrepontis	1937; 1948
1946–1948	—	(Greece) Spyridon Skouras	1946–03; 1948–03–28	(Greece) Negrepontis	1937; 1948
1948	—	(Greece) Georgios Melas	1948–03–29; 1953–11–02	(Greece) Negrepontis	1937; 1948
1948–1951	—	(Greece) Georgios Melas	1948–03–29; 1953–11–02	(England) Beby	1948–10–04; 1951–02–07
1951	—	(Greece) Georgios Melas	1948–03–29; 1953–11–02	(Greece) Tzanetis^{CT}	1951–02–09; 1951–09–19
1951–1953	—	(Greece) Georgios Melas	1948–03–29; 1953–11–02	(Italy) Magnozzi	1951–09–20; 1953–07–29
1953	—	(Greece) Georgios Melas	1948–03–29; 1953–11–02	(Greece) Daispangos	1953–07–30; 1954–12–31
1953–1954	—	(Greece) Eleftherios Venizelos	1953–11–03; 1954–10–07	(Greece) Daispangos	1953–07–30; 1954–12–31
1954–1955	—	(Greece) Georgios Chrysafidis	1954–10–08; 1957–02–12	(Greece) Daispangos	1953–07–30; 1954–12–31
1955	—	(Greece) Georgios Chrysafidis	1954–10–08; 1957–02–12	(England) Crawford	1955–01–10; 1955–10–30
1955–1957	—	(Greece) Georgios Chrysafidis	1954–10–08; 1957–02–12	(Greece) Negrepontis	1955–11–02; 1957–01–29
1957	—	(Greece) Georgios Chrysafidis	1954–10–08; 1957–02–12	(Greece) Tzanetis	1957–02–01; 1958–07–31
1957–1958	—	(Greece) Nikos Goumas	1957–02–13; 1963–11–23	(Greece) Tzanetis	1957–02–01; 1958–07–31
1958	—	(Greece) Nikos Goumas	1957–02–13; 1963–11–23	(Italy) Martini	1958–08–05; 1958–11–12
1958–1959	—	(Greece) Nikos Goumas	1957–02–13; 1963–11–23	(Greece) Negrepontis	1958–11–13; 1959–06–30
1959–1961	—	(Greece) Nikos Goumas	1957–02–13; 1963–11–23	(Austria) Aurednik	1959–07–17; 1961–01–08
1961–1962	—	(Greece) Nikos Goumas	1957–02–13; 1963–11–23	(Greece) Tzanetis	1961–01–09; 1962–06–30
1962–1963	—	(Greece) Nikos Goumas	1957–02–13; 1963–11–23	(Hungary) Csaknády	1962–07–14; 1963–07–09
1963	—	(Greece) Nikos Goumas	1957–02–13; 1963–11–23	(Austria) Müller	1963–08–17; 1964–06–29
1963–1964	—	(Greece) Alexandros Makridis	1963–11–24; 1965–12–05	(Austria) Müller	1963–08–17; 1964–06–29
1964–1965	—	(Greece) Alexandros Makridis	1963–11–24; 1965–12–05	(Socialist Federal Republic of Yugoslavia) Kokotović	1964–06–30; 1965–07–14
1965–1966	—	(Greece) Alexandros Makridis	1963–11–24; 1965–12–05	(Greece) Tzanetis	1965–07–27; 1966–12–23
1965–1966	—	(Greece) Georgios Toubalidis	1965–12–06; 1966–10–11	(Greece) Tzanetis	1965–07–27; 1966–12–23
1966	—	(Greece) Michail Trikoglou	1966–10–12; 1967–03–22	(Greece) Tzanetis	1965–07–27; 1966–12–23
1966–1967	—	(Greece) Michail Trikoglou	1966–10–12; 1967–03–22	(Greece) Magiras^{CT}	1966–12–24; 1967–01–29
1967	—	(Greece) Michail Trikoglou	1966–10–12; 1967–03–22	(Hungary) Csaknády	1967–02–01; 1968–07–24
1967	—	(Greece) Emmanouil Kalitsounakis	1967–03–23; 1967–11–26	(Hungary) Csaknády	1967–02–01; 1968–07–24
1967–1968	—	(Greece) Kosmas Kyriakidis	1967–11–27; 1969–06–17	(Hungary) Csaknády	1967–02–01; 1968–07–24
1968–1969	—	(Greece) Kosmas Kyriakidis	1967–11–27; 1969–06–17	(Socialist Federal Republic of Yugoslavia) Stanković	1968–07–25; 1973–02–07
1969–1970	—	(Greece) Georgios Chrysafidis	1969–06–18; 1970–06–23	(Socialist Federal Republic of Yugoslavia) Stanković	1968–07–25; 1973–02–07
1970–1973	—	(Greece) Kosmas Chatzicharalampous	1970–06–24; 1973–03–07	(Socialist Federal Republic of Yugoslavia) Stanković	1968–07–25; 1973–02–07
1973	—	(Greece) Kosmas Chatzicharalampous	1970–06–24; 1973–03–07	(Greece) Chatzimichail^{CT}	1973–02–08; 1973–02–22
1973	—	(Greece) Kosmas Chatzicharalampous	1970–06–24; 1973–03–07	(Northern Ireland) Bingham	1973–02–23; 1973–06–30
1973	—	(Greece) Dimitrios Avramidis	1973–03–08; 1973–05–15	(Northern Ireland) Bingham	1973–02–23; 1973–06–30
1973	—	(Greece) Ioannis Theodorakopoulos	1973–05–16; 1974–03–08	(Northern Ireland) Bingham	1973–02–23; 1973–06–30
1973–1974	—	(Greece) Ioannis Theodorakopoulos	1973–05–16; 1974–03–08	(England) Anderson	1973–08–06; 1974–04–17
1974	—	(Greece) Loukas Barlos	1974–03–09; 1981–06–07	(England) Anderson	1973–08–06; 1974–04–17
1974	—	(Greece) Loukas Barlos	1974–03–09; 1981–06–07	(Greece) Chatzimichail^{CT}	1974–04–18; 1974–06–30
1974–1977	—	(Greece) Loukas Barlos	1974–03–09; 1981–06–07	(Czechoslovakia) Fadrhonc	1974–08–02; 1977–09–23
1977	—	(Greece) Loukas Barlos	1974–03–09; 1981–06–07	(Greece) Stamatiadis^{CT}	1977–09–24; 1977–10–10
1977–1978	—	(Greece) Loukas Barlos	1974–03–09; 1981–06–07	(Socialist Federal Republic of Yugoslavia) Čajkovski	1977–10–11; 1978–06–10
1978–1979	—	(Greece) Loukas Barlos	1974–03–09; 1981–06–07	(Hungary) Puskás	1978–06–27; 1979–03–17
1978–1979	(Greece) Stamatiadis^{CT}	(Greece) Loukas Barlos	1974–03–09; 1981–06–07	1979–03–18; 1979–06–22	
1979–1980	(Greece) Loukas Barlos (60.00%) (Greece) AEK (40.00%)	(Greece) Loukas Barlos	1974–03–09; 1981–06–07	(Austria) Stessl	1979–07–01; 1980–03–25
1980–1981	(Greece) Loukas Barlos (60.00%) (Greece) AEK (40.00%)	(Greece) Loukas Barlos	1974–03–09; 1981–06–07	(Greece) Papapostolou	1980–03–26; 1981–06–18
1981	(Greece) Loukas Barlos (60.00%) (Greece) AEK (40.00%)	(Greece) Andreas Zafiropoulos	1981–06–08; 1982–06–14	(Greece) Papapostolou	1980–03–26; 1981–06–18
1981–1982	(Greece) Andreas Zafiropoulos (43.00%) (Greece) Makis Psomiadis (11.00%) (Greece) AEK (40.00%)	(Greece) Andreas Zafiropoulos	1981–06–08; 1982–06–14	(West Germany) Tilkowski	1981–06–19; 1982–01–26
1982	(Greece) Andreas Zafiropoulos (43.00%) (Greece) Makis Psomiadis (11.00%) (Greece) AEK (40.00%)	(Greece) Andreas Zafiropoulos	1981–06–08; 1982–06–14	(Socialist Federal Republic of Yugoslavia) Čajkovski	1982–01–27; 1983–01–10
1982–1983	(Greece) Andreas Zafiropoulos (43.00%) (Greece) Makis Psomiadis (11.00%) (Greece) AEK (40.00%)	(Greece) Michalis Arkadis	1982–06–15; 1983–06–19	(Socialist Federal Republic of Yugoslavia) Čajkovski	1982–01–27; 1983–01–10
1983	(Greece) Andreas Zafiropoulos (43.00%) (Greece) Makis Psomiadis (11.00%) (Greece) AEK (40.00%)	(Greece) Michalis Arkadis	1982–06–15; 1983–06–19	(Greece) Nestoridis^{CT}	1983–01–11; 1983–02–13
1983	(Greece) Andreas Zafiropoulos (43.00%) (Greece) Makis Psomiadis (11.00%) (Greece) AEK (40.00%)	(Greece) Michalis Arkadis	1982–06–15; 1983–06–19	(Austria) Senekowitsch	1983–02–14; 1983–07–22
1983	(Greece) Andreas Zafiropoulos (43.00%) (Greece) Makis Psomiadis (11.00%) (Greece) AEK (40.00%)	(Cyprus) Lefteris Panagidis	1983–06–20; 1984–01–09	(Republic of Ireland) Barnwell	1983–07–23; 1983–11–30
1983–1984	(Greece) Andreas Zafiropoulos (43.00%) (Greece) Makis Psomiadis (11.00%) (Greece) AEK (40.00%)	(Cyprus) Lefteris Panagidis	1983–06–20; 1984–01–09	(Austria) Senekowitsch	1983–12–05; 1984–02–13
1984	(Greece) Andreas Zafiropoulos (43.00%) (Greece) Makis Psomiadis (11.00%) (Greece) AEK (40.00%)	(Cyprus) Lefteris Panagidis	1983–06–20; 1984–01–09	(Greece) Nestoridis^{CT}	1984–02–14; 1984–06–30
1984	(Greece) Andreas Zafiropoulos (43.00%) (Greece) Makis Psomiadis (11.00%) (Greece) AEK (40.00%)	(Greece) Andreas Zafiropoulos	1984–01–10; 1988–05–16	(Czechoslovakia) Halama	1984–07–01; 1984–12–10
1984–1985	(Greece) Andreas Zafiropoulos (43.00%) (Greece) Makis Psomiadis (11.00%) (Greece) AEK (40.00%)	(Greece) Andreas Zafiropoulos	1984–01–10; 1988–05–16	(Greece) Georgiadis	1984–12–11; 1985–06–19
1985–86	(Greece) Andreas Zafiropoulos (43.00%) (Greece) Makis Psomiadis (11.00%) (Greece) AEK (40.00%)	(Greece) Andreas Zafiropoulos	1984–01–10; 1988–05–16	(Poland) Gmoch	1985–06–26; 1986–06–12
1986	(Greece) Andreas Zafiropoulos (43.00%) (Greece) Makis Psomiadis (11.00%) (Greece) AEK (40.00%)	(Greece) Andreas Zafiropoulos	1984–01–10; 1988–05–16	(Greece) Christidis^{CT}	1986–06–13; 1986–07–06
1986	(Greece) Andreas Zafiropoulos (43.00%) (Greece) Makis Psomiadis (11.00%) (Greece) AEK (40.00%)	(Greece) Andreas Zafiropoulos	1984–01–10; 1988–05–16	(Netherlands) Fafie	1986–07–07; 1986–12–29
1986–1987	(Greece) Andreas Zafiropoulos (43.00%) (Greece) Makis Psomiadis (11.00%) (Greece) AEK (40.00%)	(Greece) Andreas Zafiropoulos	1984–01–10; 1988–05–16	(Greece) Alefantos	1986–12–30; 1987–05–07
1987	(Greece) Andreas Zafiropoulos (43.00%) (Greece) Makis Psomiadis (11.00%) (Greece) AEK (40.00%)	(Greece) Andreas Zafiropoulos	1984–01–10; 1988–05–16	(Greece) Christidis^{CT}	1987–05–08; 1987–06–23
1987–1988	(Greece) Andreas Zafiropoulos (43.00%) (Greece) Makis Psomiadis (11.00%) (Greece) AEK (40.00%)	(Greece) Andreas Zafiropoulos	1984–01–10; 1988–05–16	(Socialist Federal Republic of Yugoslavia) Veselinović	1987–06–24; 1988–06–01
1988	(Greece) Andreas Zafiropoulos (43.00%) (Greece) Makis Psomiadis (11.00%) (Greece) AEK (40.00%)	(Greece) Kostas Generakis	1988–05–17; 1988–06–12	(Socialist Federal Republic of Yugoslavia) Veselinović	1987–06–24; 1988–06–01
1988–1991	(Greece) Andreas Zafiropoulos (43.00%) (Greece) Makis Psomiadis (11.00%) (Greece) AEK (40.00%)	(Greece) Stratos Gidopoulos	1988–06–13; 1991–03–19	(Socialist Federal Republic of Yugoslavia) Bajević	1988–06–17; 1996–06–03
1991	(Greece) Andreas Zafiropoulos (43.00%) (Greece) Makis Psomiadis (11.00%) (Greece) AEK (40.00%)	(Greece) Kostas Angelopoulos	1991–03–20; 1991–05–12	(Socialist Federal Republic of Yugoslavia) Bajević	1988–06–17; 1996–06–03
1991–1992	(Greece) Andreas Zafiropoulos (52.00%) (Greece) AEK (40.00%)	(Greece) Kostas Generakis	1991–05–13; 1992–06–16	(Socialist Federal Republic of Yugoslavia) Bajević	1988–06–17; 1996–06–03
1992–1993	(Greece) Dimitris Melissanidis (26.00%) (Greece) Giannis Karras (26.00%) (Greece) Giannis Granitsas (8.00%) (Greece) AEK (40.00%)	(Greece) Dimitris Melissanidis	1992–06–17; 1993–06–15	(Socialist Federal Republic of Yugoslavia) Bajević	1988–06–17; 1996–06–03
1993–1994	(Greece) Dimitris Melissanidis (26.00%) (Greece) Giannis Karras (26.00%) (Greece) Giannis Granitsas (8.00%) (Greece) AEK (40.00%)	(Greece) Giannis Karras	1993–06–16; 1994–05–31	(Socialist Federal Republic of Yugoslavia) Bajević	1988–06–17; 1996–06–03
1994–1995	(Greece) Dimitris Melissanidis (26.00%) (Greece) Giannis Karras (26.00%) (Greece) Giannis Granitsas (8.00%) (Greece) AEK (40.00%)	(Greece) Dimitris Melissanidis	1994–06–01; 1995–05–31	(Socialist Federal Republic of Yugoslavia) Bajević	1988–06–17; 1996–06–03
1995	(Greece) Michalis Trochanas (51.00%) (Greece) Fage (39.00%) (Greece) Giannis Granitsas (10.00%) (Greece) AEK (10.00%)	(Greece) Dimitris Melissanidis	1994–06–01; 1995–05–31	(Socialist Federal Republic of Yugoslavia) Bajević	1988–06–17; 1996–06–03
1995	(Greece) Michalis Trochanas (51.00%) (Greece) Fage (39.00%) (Greece) Giannis Granitsas (10.00%) (Greece) AEK (10.00%)	(Greece) Giannis Karras	1995–06–01; 1995–10–03	(Socialist Federal Republic of Yugoslavia) Bajević	1988–06–17; 1996–06–03
1995	(Greece) Michalis Trochanas (75.00%) (Greece) Fage (15.00%) (Greece) Giannis Granitsas (10.00%) (Greece) AEK (10.00%)	(Greece) Giannis Karras	1995–06–01; 1995–10–03	(Socialist Federal Republic of Yugoslavia) Bajević	1988–06–17; 1996–06–03
1995–1996	(Greece) Michalis Trochanas (75.00%) (Greece) Fage (15.00%) (Greece) Giannis Granitsas (10.00%) (Greece) AEK (10.00%)	(Greece) Michalis Trochanas	1995–10–04; 1996–04–01	(Socialist Federal Republic of Yugoslavia) Bajević	1988–06–17; 1996–06–03
1996	(Greece) Michalis Trochanas (75.00%) (Greece) Fage (15.00%) (Greece) Giannis Granitsas (10.00%) (Greece) AEK (10.00%)	(Greece) Nikos Stratos	1996–04–02; 1996–12–30	(Socialist Federal Republic of Yugoslavia) Bajević	1988–06–17; 1996–06–03
1996	(Greece) Michalis Trochanas (75.00%) (Greece) Fage (15.00%) (Greece) Giannis Granitsas (10.00%) (Greece) AEK (10.00%)	(Greece) Nikos Stratos	1996–04–02; 1996–12–30	(Greece) Ravousis	1996–07–10; 1997–06–04
1996–1997	(Greece) Michalis Trochanas (75.00%) (Greece) Fage (15.00%) (Greece) Giannis Granitsas (10.00%) (Greece) AEK (10.00%)	(Greece) Giorgos Kyriopoulos	1996–12–31; 1997–06–29	(Greece) Ravousis	1996–07–10; 1997–06–04
1997	(Greece) Michalis Trochanas (79.00%) (Greece) AEK (10.00%)	(Greece) Alexis Kougias	1997–06–30; 1997–10–10	(Romania) Dumitriu	1997–06–14; 1998–04–02
1997–1998	(United Kingdom) ENIC Hellas (79%) (Greece) AEK (10.00%)	(Greece) Lakis Nikolaou	1997–10–11; 1998–10–20	(Romania) Dumitriu	1997–06–14; 1998–04–02
1998	(United Kingdom) ENIC Hellas (79%) (Greece) AEK (10.00%)	(Greece) Lakis Nikolaou	1997–10–11; 1998–10–20	(Greece) Minou^{CT}	1998–04–03; 1998–06–02
1998	(United Kingdom) ENIC Hellas (79%) (Greece) AEK (10.00%)	(Greece) Lakis Nikolaou	1997–10–11; 1998–10–20	(Serbia and Montenegro) Stepanović	1998–06–03; 1998–10–30
1998	(United Kingdom) ENIC Hellas (79%) (Greece) AEK (10.00%)	(Greece) Kostas Generakis	1998–10–20; 1999–09–10	(Serbia and Montenegro) Stepanović	1998–06–03; 1998–10–30
1998	(United Kingdom) ENIC Hellas (79%) (Greece) AEK (10.00%)	(Greece) Kostas Generakis	1998–10–20; 1999–09–10	(Greece) Karagiozopoulos^{CT}	1998–10–31; 1998–11–24
1998–1999	(United Kingdom) ENIC Hellas (79%) (Greece) AEK (10.00%)	(Greece) Kostas Generakis	1998–10–20; 1999–09–10	(Ukraine) Blokhin	1998–11–25; 1999–05–27
1999	(United Kingdom) ENIC Hellas (79%) (Greece) AEK (10.00%)	(Greece) Kostas Generakis	1998–10–20; 1999–09–10	(Serbia and Montenegro) Tumbaković	1999–06–03; 2000–01–07
1999	(United Kingdom) ENIC Helllas (47%) (Netherlands) Netmed Hellas (32%) (Greece) AEK (10.00%)	(Greece) Kostas Generakis	1998–10–20; 1999–09–10	(Serbia and Montenegro) Tumbaković	1999–06–03; 2000–01–07
1999–2000	(United Kingdom) ENIC Helllas (47%) (Netherlands) Netmed Hellas (32%) (Greece) AEK (10.00%)	(Greece) Stefanos Mamatzis	1999–09–11; 2000–01–10	(Serbia and Montenegro) Tumbaković	1999–06–03; 2000–01–07
2000	(United Kingdom) ENIC Helllas (47%) (Netherlands) Netmed Hellas (32%) (Greece) AEK (10.00%)	(Greece) Stefanos Mamatzis	1999–09–11; 2000–01–10	(Greece) Karagiozopoulos^{CT}	2000–01–08; 2000–01–09
2000	(United Kingdom) ENIC Helllas (47%) (Netherlands) Netmed Hellas (32%) (Greece) AEK (10.00%)	(Greece) Stefanos Mamatzis	1999–09–11; 2000–01–10	(Greece) Pathiakakis	2000–01–10; 2001–01–24
2000–2001	(United Kingdom) ENIC Helllas (47%) (Netherlands) Netmed Hellas (32%) (Greece) AEK (10.00%)	(Netherlands) Cornelius Sierhuis	2000–01–11; 2001–07–11	(Greece) Pathiakakis	2000–01–10; 2001–01–24
2001	(United Kingdom) ENIC Helllas (47%) (Netherlands) Netmed Hellas (32%) (Greece) AEK (10.00%)	(Netherlands) Cornelius Sierhuis	2000–01–11; 2001–07–11	(North Macedonia) Savevski	2001–01–26; 2001–06–15
2001–2002	(Greece) Ippoventure (71.28%) (Netherlands) Netmed Hellas (11.72%) (Greece) AEK (10.00%)	(Greece) Filon Antonopoulos	2001–07–12; 2002–01–02	(Portugal) Santos	2001–06–17; 2002–05–09
2002	(Greece) Ippoventure (71.28%) (Netherlands) Netmed Hellas (11.72%) (Greece) AEK (10.00%)	(Greece) Charilaos Psomiadis	2002–01–03; 2003–01–22	(Portugal) Santos	2001–06–17; 2002–05–09
2002–2003	(Greece) Ippoventure (71.28%) (Netherlands) Netmed Hellas (11.72%) (Greece) AEK (10.00%)	(Greece) Charilaos Psomiadis	2002–01–03; 2003–01–22	(Bosnia and Herzegovina) Bajević	2002–05–19; 2004–01–26
2003	(Greece) Ippoventure (71.28%) (Netherlands) Netmed Hellas (11.72%) (Greece) AEK (10.00%)	(Greece) Giannis Granitsas	2003–01–29; 2004–03–09	(Bosnia and Herzegovina) Bajević	2002–05–19; 2004–01–26
2003–2004	(United Kingdom) ENIC Helllas (51%) (Greece) Petros Stathis (20.28%) (Netherlands) Netmed Hellas (11.72%) (Greece) AEK (10.00%)	(Greece) Giannis Granitsas	2003–01–29; 2004–03–09	(Bosnia and Herzegovina) Bajević	2002–05–19; 2004–01–26
2004	(United Kingdom) ENIC Helllas (51%) (Greece) Petros Stathis (20.28%) (Netherlands) Netmed Hellas (11.72%) (Greece) AEK (10.00%)	(Greece) Giannis Granitsas	2003–01–29; 2004–03–09	(Greece) Bouroutzikas^{CT}	2004–01–29; 2004–02–01
2004	(United Kingdom) ENIC Helllas (51%) (Greece) Petros Stathis (20.28%) (Netherlands) Netmed Hellas (11.72%) (Greece) AEK (10.00%)	(Greece) Giannis Granitsas	2003–01–29; 2004–03–09	(Romania) Dumitrescu	2004–02–02; 2004–06–30
2004	(United Kingdom) ENIC Helllas (51%) (Greece) Petros Stathis (20.28%) (Netherlands) Netmed Hellas (11.72%) (Greece) AEK (10.00%)	(Greece) Kostas Generakis	2004–03–10; 2004–05–28	(Romania) Dumitrescu	2004–02–02; 2004–06–30
2004	(Greece) Nikos Notias (26.62%) (Greece) Takis Kannelopoulos (18.64%) (Greece) Gikas Goumas (13.31%) (Greece) Demis Nikolaidis (12.96%); Others (11.81%) (Greece) AEK (10.00%) (Greece) Tasos Thanopoulos (6.66%)	(Greece) Alexis Kougias	2004–07–03; 2004–07–08	(Portugal) Santos	2004–07–16; 2006–05–31
2004	(Greece) Nikos Notias (26.62%) (Greece) Takis Kannelopoulos (18.64%) (Greece) Gikas Goumas (13.31%) (Greece) Demis Nikolaidis (12.96%); Others (11.81%) (Greece) AEK (10.00%) (Greece) Tasos Thanopoulos (6.66%)	(Greece) Andreas Dimitrelos	2004–07–09; 2004–08–03	(Portugal) Santos	2004–07–16; 2006–05–31
2004–2005	(Greece) Nikos Notias (26.62%) (Greece) Takis Kannelopoulos (18.64%) (Greece) Gikas Goumas (13.31%) (Greece) Demis Nikolaidis (12.96%); Others (11.81%) (Greece) AEK (10.00%) (Greece) Tasos Thanopoulos (6.66%)	(Greece) Demis Nikolaidis	2004–08–04; 2008–11–04	(Portugal) Santos	2004–07–16; 2006–05–31
2005–2006	(Greece) Nikos Notias (26.62%) (Greece) Gikas Goumas (20.78%) (Greece) Takis Kannelopoulos (14.85%) (Greece) AEK (10.00%) (Greece) Demis Nikolaidis (9.13%) (Greece) Tasos Thanopoulos (6.66%); Others (11.96%)	(Greece) Demis Nikolaidis	2004–08–04; 2008–11–04	(Portugal) Santos	2004–07–16; 2006–05–31
2006–2007	(Greece) Nikos Notias (26.62%) (Greece) Gikas Goumas (20.78%) (Greece) Takis Kannelopoulos (14.85%); Others (11.71%) (Greece) AEK (10.00%) (Greece) Demis Nikolaidis (9.13%) (Greece) Tasos Thanopoulos (6.91%)	(Greece) Demis Nikolaidis	2004–08–04; 2008–11–04	(Spain) Ferrer	2006–06–07; 2008–02–12
2007–2008	(Greece) Nikos Notias (25.81%) (Greece) Gikas Goumas (19.65%) (Greece) Takis Kannelopoulos (13.91%); Others (16.36%) (Greece) AEK (10.00%) (Greece) Demis Nikolaidis (8.29%) (Greece) Tasos Thanopoulos (5.98%)	(Greece) Demis Nikolaidis	2004–08–04; 2008–11–04	(Spain) Ferrer	2006–06–07; 2008–02–12
2008	(Greece) Nikos Notias (25.81%) (Greece) Gikas Goumas (19.65%) (Greece) Takis Kannelopoulos (13.91%); Others (16.36%) (Greece) AEK (10.00%) (Greece) Demis Nikolaidis (8.29%) (Greece) Tasos Thanopoulos (5.98%)	(Greece) Demis Nikolaidis	2004–08–04; 2008–11–04	(Greece) Kostenoglou	2008–02–13; 2008–05–14
2008	(Greece) Nikos Notias (25.77%) (Greece) Gikas Goumas (19.65%); Others (16.40%) (Greece) Takis Kannelopoulos (13.91%) (Greece) AEK (10.00%) (Greece) Demis Nikolaidis (8.29%) (Greece) Nikos Thanopoulos (5.98%)	(Greece) Demis Nikolaidis	2004–08–04; 2008–11–04	(Greece) Donis	2008–05–14; 2008–11–17
2008–2009	(Greece) Nikos Notias (25.77%) (Greece) Gikas Goumas (19.65%); Others (16.40%) (Greece) Takis Kannelopoulos (13.91%) (Greece) AEK (10.00%) (Greece) Demis Nikolaidis (8.29%) (Greece) Nikos Thanopoulos (5.98%)	(Greece) Giorgos Kintis	2008–12–02; 2009–02–03	(Bosnia and Herzegovina) Bajević	2008–11–21; 2010–09–27
2009–2010	(Greece) Nikos Notias (33.08%) (Greece) Gikas Goumas (17.93%) (Greece) Petros Pappas (13.25%) (Greece) Takis Kannelopoulos (11.01%) (Greece) AEK (10.00%); Others (5.49%) (Greece) Nikos Thanopoulos (4.76%) (Greece) Demis Nikolaidis (4.48%)	(Greece) Nikos Thanopoulos	2009–02–04; 2010–03–14	(Bosnia and Herzegovina) Bajević	2008–11–21; 2010–09–27
2010	(Greece) Nikos Notias (41.35%) (Greece) Gikas Goumas (22.41%) (Greece) Petros Pappas (16.56%) (Greece) AEK (12.50%)	(Greece) Stavros Adamidis	2010–03–15; 2012–02–02	(Bosnia and Herzegovina) Bajević	2008–11–21; 2010–09–27
2010	(Greece) Nikos Notias (41.35%) (Greece) Gikas Goumas (22.41%) (Greece) Petros Pappas (16.56%) (Greece) AEK (12.50%)	(Greece) Stavros Adamidis	2010–03–15; 2012–02–02	(Albania) Kola^{CT}	2010–09–28; 2010–10–07
2010–2011	(Greece) Nikos Notias (41.35%) (Greece) Gikas Goumas (22.41%) (Greece) Petros Pappas (16.56%) (Greece) AEK (12.50%)	(Greece) Stavros Adamidis	2010–03–15; 2012–02–02	(Spain) Jiménez	2010–10–08; 2011–10–05
2011	(Greece) Nikos Notias (43.43%) (Greece) Supporters Club (17.58%)	(Greece) Stavros Adamidis	2010–03–15; 2012–02–02	(Spain) Jiménez	2010–10–08; 2011–10–05
2011–2012	(Greece) Nikos Notias (43.43%) (Greece) Supporters Club (17.58%)	(Greece) Stavros Adamidis	2010–03–15; 2012–02–02	(Greece) Kostenoglou	2011–10–05; 2012–06–25
2012	(Greece) Nikos Notias (43.43%) (Greece) Supporters Club (17.58%)	(Greece) Andreas Dimitrelos	2012–02–03; 2012–07–31	(Greece) Kostenoglou	2011–10–05; 2012–06–25
2012	(Greece) Nikos Notias (43.43%) (Greece) Supporters Club (17.58%)	(Greece) Thomas Mavros	2012–08–01; 2012–10–01	(Greece) Vlachos	2012–06–26; 2012–09–30
2012	(Greece) Nikos Notias (43.43%) (Greece) Supporters Club (17.58%)	(Greece) Andreas Dimitrelos	2012–10–05; 2013–06–07	(Greece) Papadopoulos^{CT}	2012–10–06; 2012–10–09
2012–2013	(Greece) Nikos Notias (43.43%) (Greece) Supporters Club (17.58%)	(Greece) Andreas Dimitrelos	2012–10–05; 2013–06–07	(Germany) Lienen	2012–10–10; 2013–04–09
2013–2015	(Greece) Nikos Notias (43.43%) (Greece) Supporters Club (17.58%)	(Greece) Andreas Dimitrelos	2012–10–05; 2013–06–07	(Greece) Dellas	2013–04–09; 2015–10–20
2013–2014	(Greece) Union Friends of AEK (87.58%) (Greece) AEK (10.00%) (Greece) Stergios Antzoulas (2.42%)	(Greece) Konstantinos Kotsatos (AEK)	2013–06–08; 2014–05–29	(Greece) Dellas	2013–04–09; 2015–10–20
2014	(Greece) Union Friends of AEK (87.58%) (Greece) AEK (10.00%) (Greece) Stergios Antzoulas (2.42%)	(Greece) Alexis Alexiou (AEK)	2014–05–30; 2014–07–17	(Greece) Dellas	2013–04–09; 2015–10–20
2014–2015	(Greece) Union Friends of AEK (87.58%) (Greece) AEK (10.00%) (Greece) Stergios Antzoulas (2.42%)	(Greece) Evangelos Aslanidis	2014–07–18	(Greece) Dellas	2013–04–09; 2015–10–20
2015	(Greece) Union Friends of AEK (87.58%) (Greece) AEK (10.00%) (Greece) Stergios Antzoulas (2.42%)	(Greece) Evangelos Aslanidis	2014–07–18	(Greece) Manolas^{CT}	2015–10–21; 2015–10–28
2015–2016	(Greece) Union Friends of AEK (87.58%) (Greece) AEK (10.00%) (Greece) Stergios Antzoulas (2.42%)	(Greece) Evangelos Aslanidis	2014–07–18	(Uruguay) Poyet	2015–10–29; 2016–04–19
2016	(Greece) Union Friends of AEK (87.58%) (Greece) AEK (10.00%) (Greece) Stergios Antzoulas (2.42%)	(Greece) Evangelos Aslanidis	2014–07–18	(Greece) Manolas^{CT}	2016–04–20; 2016–06–05
2016	(Greece) Union Friends of AEK (87.58%) (Greece) AEK (10.00%) (Greece) Stergios Antzoulas (2.42%)	(Greece) Evangelos Aslanidis	2014–07–18	(Georgia (country)) Ketsbaia	2016–06–06; 2016–10–18
2016–2017	(Greece) Union Friends of AEK (87.58%) (Greece) AEK (10.00%) (Greece) Stergios Antzoulas (2.42%)	(Greece) Evangelos Aslanidis	2014–07–18	(Portugal) Morais	2016–10–18; 2017–01–18
2017–2018	(Greece) Union Friends of AEK (87.58%) (Greece) AEK (10.00%) (Greece) Stergios Antzoulas (2.42%)	(Greece) Evangelos Aslanidis	2014–07–18	(Spain) Jimenez	2017–01–19; 2018–05–25
2018–2019	(Greece) Union Friends of AEK (87.58%) (Greece) AEK (10.00%) (Greece) Stergios Antzoulas (2.42%)	(Greece) Evangelos Aslanidis	2014–07–18	(Greece) Ouzounidis	2018–05–25; 2019–02–05
2019	(Greece) Union Friends of AEK (87.58%) (Greece) AEK (10.00%) (Greece) Stergios Antzoulas (2.42%)	(Greece) Evangelos Aslanidis	2014–07–18	(Spain) Jimenez	2019–02–06; 2019–05–27
2019	(Greece) Union Friends of AEK (87.58%) (Greece) AEK (10.00%) (Greece) Stergios Antzoulas (2.42%)	(Greece) Evangelos Aslanidis	2014–07–18	(Portugal) Cardoso	2019–05–28; 2019–08–26
2019	(Greece) Union Friends of AEK (87.58%) (Greece) AEK (10.00%) (Greece) Stergios Antzoulas (2.42%)	(Greece) Evangelos Aslanidis	2014–07–18	(Greece) Kostenoglou	2019–08–25; 2019–12–08
2019–2020	(Greece) Union Friends of AEK (87.58%) (Greece) AEK (10.00%) (Greece) Stergios Antzoulas (2.42%)	(Greece) Evangelos Aslanidis	2014–07–18	(Italy) Carrera	2019–12–08; 2020–12–22
2020–2021	(Greece) Union Friends of AEK (87.58%) (Greece) AEK (10.00%) (Greece) Stergios Antzoulas (2.42%)	(Greece) Evangelos Aslanidis	2014–07–18	(Spain) Jimenez	2020–12–27; 2021–05–26
2021	(Greece) Dimitris Melissanidis (80.74%) (Greece) AEK (10.00%) (Greece) Union Friends of AEK (6.84%) (Greece) Stergios Antzoulas (2.42%)	(Greece) Evangelos Aslanidis	2014–07–18	(Serbia) Milojević	2021–05–27; 2021–10–08
2021–2022	(Greece) Dimitris Melissanidis (80.74%) (Greece) AEK (10.00%) (Greece) Union Friends of AEK (6.84%) (Greece) Stergios Antzoulas (2.42%)	(Greece) Evangelos Aslanidis	2014–07–18	(Germany) Giannikis	2021–10–10; 2022–03–01
2022	(Greece) Dimitris Melissanidis (80.74%) (Greece) AEK (10.00%) (Greece) Union Friends of AEK (6.84%) (Greece) Stergios Antzoulas (2.42%)	(Greece) Evangelos Aslanidis	2014–07–18	(Greece) Ofrydopoulos^{CT}	2022–03–02; 2022–05–19
2022–2024	(Greece) Dimitris Melissanidis (80.74%) (Greece) AEK (10.00%) (Greece) Union Friends of AEK (6.84%) (Greece) Stergios Antzoulas (2.42%)	(Greece) Evangelos Aslanidis	2014–07–18	(Argentina) Almeyda	2022–05–20; 2025–05–13
2024–2025	(Greece) Marios Iliopoulos (85.03%) (Greece) AEK (10.00%) (Greece) Union Friends of AEK (2.55%) (Greece) Stergios Antzoulas (2.42%)	(Greece) Evangelos Aslanidis	2014–07–18	(Argentina) Almeyda	2022–05–20; 2025–05–13
2025–	(Greece) Marios Iliopoulos (85.03%) (Greece) AEK (10.00%) (Greece) Union Friends of AEK (2.55%) (Greece) Stergios Antzoulas (2.42%)	(Greece) Evangelos Aslanidis	2014–07–18	(Serbia) Nikolić	2025–06–14

^{CT}Served as caretaker manager.

== Kit ==
=== Crest and Colours ===
Flag of the Greek Orthodox Church.

Emblem of the Palaiologos dynasty.

In 1924, AEK Athens adopted the image of a double-headed eagle as their emblem. AEK Athens was created by Greek refugees from Constantinople in the years following the Greco-Turkish War and subsequent population exchange and the emblem was chosen as a reminder of their lost homelands representing the club's historical ties to Constantinople. After all, the double-headed eagle is featured in the flag of the Greek Orthodox Church, whose headquarters are in Constantinople and served as Imperial emblem under the Palaiologos dynasty.

AEK Athens' main emblem underwent numerous minor changes between 1924 and 1982. The design of the eagle on the shirt badge was often not identical to the design of the eagle depicted on official club correspondence, merchandise and promotional material. All designs were considered "official" (in the broadest sense of the word), however, it was not until 1982 that an identifiable, copyrighted design was established as the club's official shirt and badge. The emblem design was changed in 1989 and again in 1993 to the current shield design.

Yellow and black, the colours AEK Athens has adopted for their kits come from it connection with Constantinople and the Byzantine Empire. Yellow symbolises the hope that the Greek refugees will once be able to return to their homes while black symbolises the grief for the loss of their homes. The colours are also featured in the flag of the Greek Orthodox Church.

The third kit is usually blue and white colour taken from the Greek flag. For a couple of season the third kit used to be dark scarlet, a colour which was featured in the Empire's flag.

AEK Athens have always worn predominantly striped or plain yellow shirts, black shorts and yellow or black socks. Variations mostly include all-black or all-yellow kits. The most notable exception were the kits manufactured by Italian firms Basic and Kappa which were used during the 1990s. They featured a double-headed eagle across the kit and the 1994 version was voted "Kit of the season" by UEFA.

=== Kit history ===
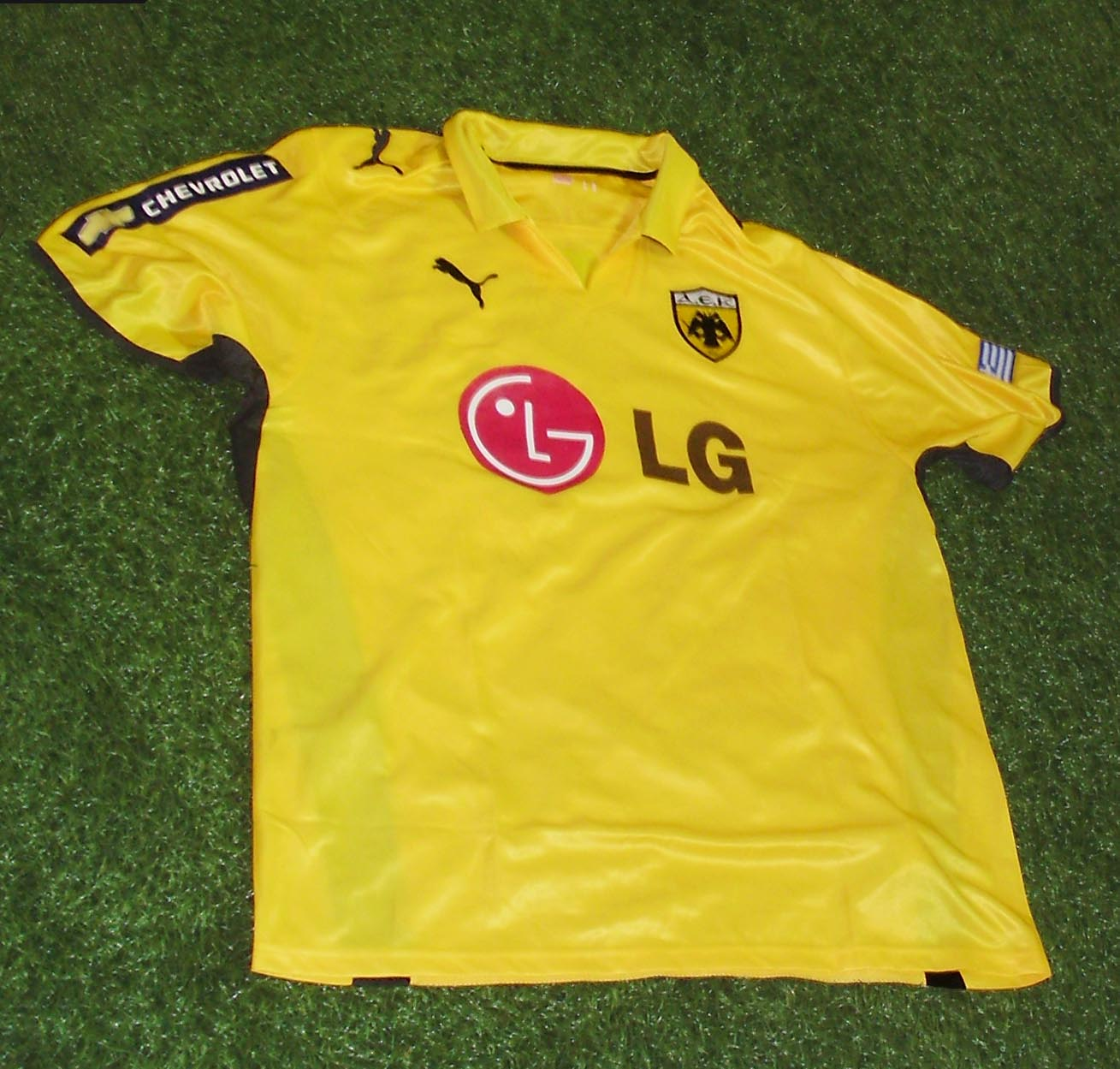
2008–09 Home kit

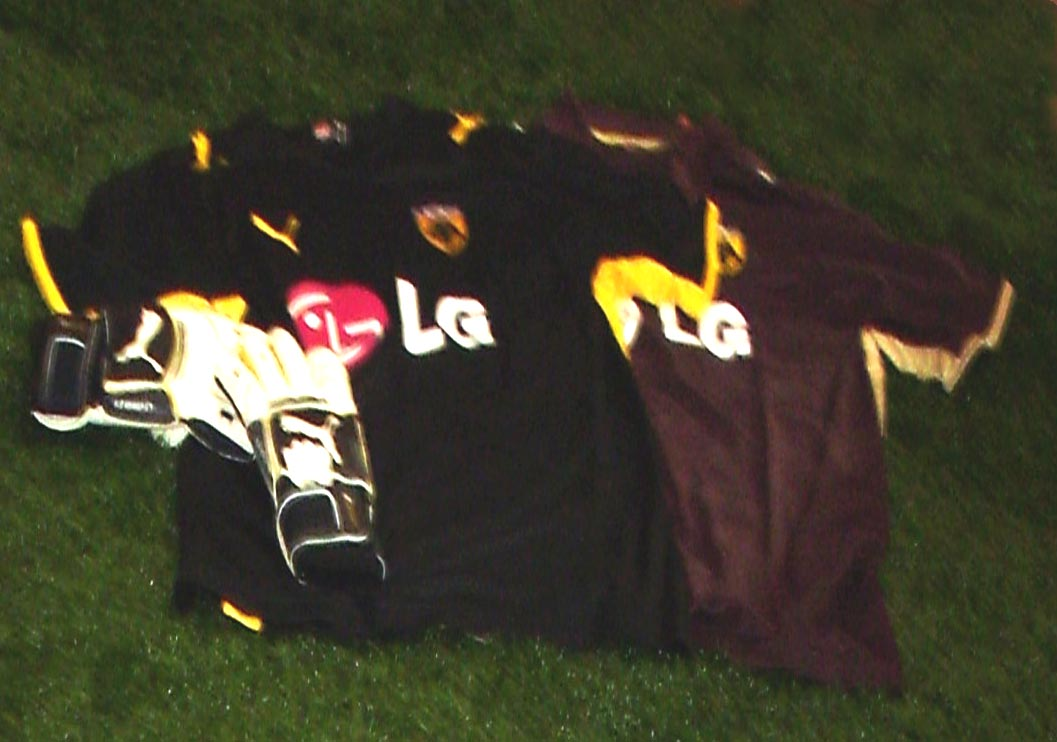
2008–09 Away and 3rd kit

==== 1920's–1950's ====
1924	1927	1929	1930	1931–32	1937–38	1938–40	1946–47	1949–50	1950–51	1955–56	1956–57

==== 1960's–1990's ====
1976–77	1988–89	1991–1992	1993–1996	1999–2000

==== 2000's ====
2000 special (Note: Designed to honour Mimis Papaioannou who was named Greek player of the 20th century)	2000–02	2002–04	2004–05	2005–06	2006–07	2007–08	2008–09	2009–10

==== 2010's ====
2010–11	2011–12	2012–13	2013–14	2014–15	2015–16	2016–17	2017–18	2018–19	2019–20

==== 2020's ====
2020–21	2021–22	2022–23	2023–24	2024–25	2025–26	2026–27

=== Kit sponsors and manufacturers ===
Period	Manufacturer	Shirt main sponsor	Shirt back sponsor	Shorts sponsor	Sleeves sponsor
1976–82	Adidas	—	—		
1982–83	Adidas	Citizen	—		
1982–83	Zita Hellas	Citizen	—		
1983–85	Zita Hellas	Nissan	—		
1985–89	Zita Hellas	Ethniki Asfalistiki	—		
1989–92	Diadora	Ethniki Asfalistiki	—		
1992–93	Diadora	Phoenix Asfaleies	—		
1993–95	Basic	Phoenix Asfaleies	—		
1995–96	Kappa	Ethniki Asfalistiki	—		
1995–96	Kappa	Filmnet	—		
1996–98	Kappa	Geniki Bank	—		
1998–99	Kappa	Firestone	—		
1999–00	Kappa	Marfin	—		
2000–01	Nike	Marfin	Samsung		—
2001–02	Nike	Alpha Digital	—		
2002–03	Nike	Piraeus Bank	—		
2003–04	Nike	Piraeus Bank	Telestet		—
2003–04	Nike	Piraeus Bank	TIM		—
2004–05	Nike	—	—		
2004–05	Adidas	TIM	—		
2005–06	Adidas	TIM	Diners Club	Galaxias Asfalistiki	—
2006–07	Adidas	LG Corp	Diners Club	Forthnet	—
2007–08	Puma	LG Corp	Diners Club	Forthnet	Chevrolet
2008–09	Puma	LG Corp	Diners Club	—	Chevrolet
2009–10	Puma	Diners Club	—		
2010–13	Puma	Kino	International Service Oil	—	
2013–14	Puma	Joker	Fujitsu	—	
2014–15	Puma	Jeep	Fujitsu	—	
2015–18	Nike	Pame stoixima	—	LG Corp	—
2018–21	Capelli	Pame stoixima	—	LG Corp	—
2021–24	Nike	Pame stoixima	Car.gr	LG Corp	—
2024–	Nike	Pame stoixima	Seajets	LG Corp	Piraeus Bank

== Stadiums ==
Stadium Name	Capacity	Years
Nikos Goumas Stadium	24,729 (35,000 before the 1998 renovation)	1930–1985; 1987–2003
Athens Olympic Stadium	69,618 (80,000 before the 2004 renovation)	1985–1987; 2004–2022
Agia Sophia Stadium	32,500	2022–

== Training facilities ==
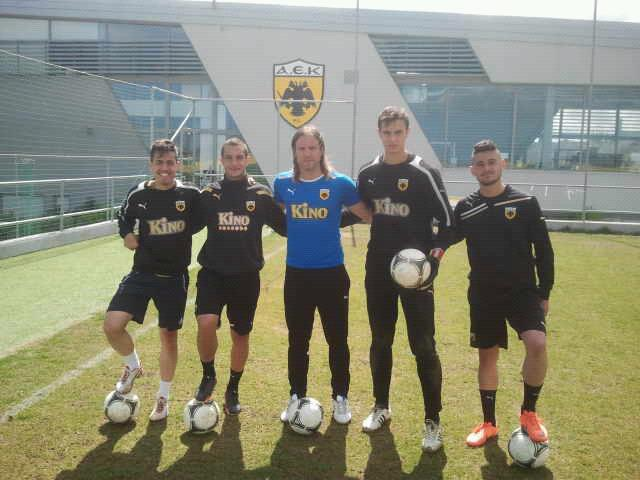
Karalis, Rikka, Backhaus, Moschonas and Stamatis in Spata (2013-03-05)

AEK Athens had been using an old training complex in Thrakomakedones for years. In November 2010, they moved to the Spata Training Centre. The complex was built using funds of the then shareholder Nikos Notias. During the ownership of Dimitris Melissanidis the training center was modernized in 2013 and was expanded in 2014. In April 2022 a pitch with stands under the name "Serafidio Stadium" was built to host the matches of AEK Athens B and friendly games of the first team.

== Youth academy ==
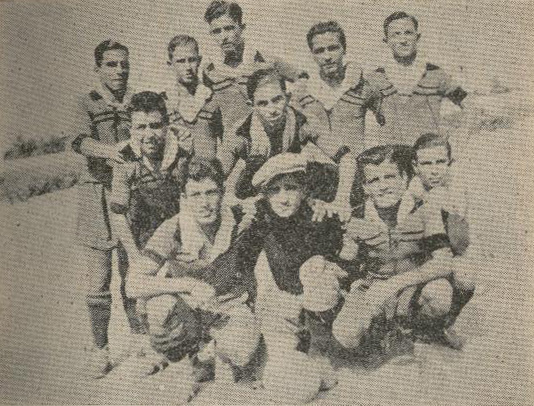
Players of AEK's youth academy (1934)

AEK was the first Greek club to found a youth academy back in 1934.

Famous players have been produced by AEK youth development system over the years.

Some of the most notable include: Tryfon Tzanetis (1933–1950), Kleanthis Maropoulos (1934–1952), Andreas Stamatiadis (1950–1969), Stelios Skevofilakas (1960–1973), Nikos Karoulias (1973–1976), Stelios Manolas (1978–1998), Spyros Ikonomopoulos (1977–1996), Vangelis Vlachos (1979–1985), Lysandros Georgamlis (1979–1985), Pantelis Konstantinidis (1993–1994), Dionysis Chiotis (1994–2007), Sokratis Papastathopoulos (2005–2008), Savvas Gentsoglou (2006–2012), Panagiotis Tachtsidis (2007–2010), Kostas Manolas (2009–2012), Victor Klonaridis (2010–2012, 2017–2020) and Konstantinos Galanopoulos (2015–2025).

== One-club men ==
Player	Position	Debut	Last match
(Greece) Giorgos Giamalis	GK	1926	1932
(Greece) Ilias Iliaskos	FW	1927	1933
(Greece) Christos Ribas	GK	1929	1947
(Greece) Tryfon Tzanetis	FW	1933	1951
(Greece) Georgios Magiras	MF	1933	1949
(Greece) Kleanthis Maropoulos	FW	1934	1952
(Greece) Michalis Delavinias	GK	1938	1955
(Greece) Michalis Papatheodorou	MF	1944	1956
(Greece) Antonis Parayios	DF	1948	1957
(Greece) Andreas Stamatiadis	FW	1952	1969
(Greece) Stelios Serafidis	GK	1953	1972
(Greece) Lakis Frogoudakis	DF	1964	1969
(Greece) Spyros Ikonomopoulos	GK	1977	1996
(Greece) Stelios Manolas	DF	1979	1998

== Personnel in multiple positions ==
Name	Player	Manager	Chairman
(Greece) Themos Asderis	1924–1930	1932–1933; 1936–1937	—
(Greece) Kostas Negrepontis	1926–1933	1933–1936; 1937–1948; 1955–1957; 1958–1959	—
(Greece) Georgios Daispangos	1929–1935	1953–1954	—
(Greece) Tryfon Tzanetis	1933–1951	1951; 1957–1958; 1961–1962; 1965–1967	—
(Greece) Kostas Chatzimichail	1956–1959	1973; 1974	—
(Greece) Andreas Stamatiadis	1950–1969	1977; 1979	—
(Greece) Miltos Papapostolou	1956–1965	1980–1981	—
(Greece) Kostas Nestoridis	1955–1965	1983; 1984	—
(Greece) Nikos Christidis	1976–1982	1986; 1987	—
(Bosnia and Herzegovina) Dušan Bajević	1977–1981	1988–1996; 2002–2004; 2008–2010	—
(Greece) Petros Ravousis	1972–1984	1996–1997	—
(Greece) Lakis Nikolaou	1971–1982	—	1997–1998
(Greece) Takis Karagiozopoulos	1981–1992	1998; 2000	—
(Greece) Antonis Minou	1988–1993	1998	—
(North Macedonia) Toni Savevski	1988–2001	2001	—
(Greece) Nikos Kostenoglou	1994–2005	2008; 2011–2012; 2019	—
(Greece) Demis Nikolaidis	1996–2003	—	2004–2008
(Greece) Georgios Donis	1997–1999	2008	—
(Albania) Bledar Kola	2001–2002	2010	—
(Greece) Thomas Mavros	1976–1987	—	2012
(Greece) Manolis Papadopoulos	1992–1995	2012	—
(Greece) Vangelis Vlachos	1980–1985	2012	—
(Greece) Traianos Dellas	1999–2001; 2005–2008; 2010–2012	2013–2015	—
(Greece) Stelios Manolas	1980–1998	2015; 2016	—
(Georgia (country)) Temur Ketsbaia	1994–1997	2016	—

== Competition timeline ==
Season	Domestic competitions						International competitions					Top scorer	
Season	League	Play-offs	Cup	Super Cup	League Cup	AFCA	UCL	CWC	ICFC / UEL	UECL	Balkans Cup	Player(s)	Goals
1924–25	Did not exist	Did not exist	Did not exist	Did not exist	Did not exist	RU	Did not exist	Did not exist	Did not exist	Did not exist	Did not exist		
1925–26	Did not exist	Did not exist	Did not exist	Did not exist	Did not exist	3rd	Did not exist	Did not exist	Did not exist	Did not exist	Did not exist		
1926–27	Did not exist	Did not exist	Did not exist	Did not exist	Did not exist	RU	Did not exist	Did not exist	Did not exist	Did not exist	Did not exist	Kostas Negrepontis	10
1927–28	Withdrew	Did not exist	Did not exist	Did not exist	Did not exist	Withdrew	Did not exist	Did not exist	Did not exist	Did not exist	Did not exist	—	
1928–29	Not held	Did not exist	Did not exist	Did not exist	Did not exist	RU	Did not exist	Did not exist	Did not exist	Did not exist	Did not exist	Kostas Negrepontis	6
1929–30	Did not qualify	Did not exist	Did not exist	Did not exist	Did not exist	RU	Did not exist	Did not exist	Did not exist	Did not exist	Did not exist	Dimitris Mougras	10
1930–31	4th	Did not exist	Did not exist	Did not exist	Did not exist	RU	Did not exist	Did not exist	Did not exist	Did not exist	Did not exist	Dimitris Mougras	11+
1931–32	8th	Did not exist	W	Did not exist	Did not exist	Not eligible	Did not exist	Did not exist	Did not exist	Did not exist	Did not exist	Ilias Iliaskos	7
1932–33	3rd	Did not exist	R2	Did not exist	Did not exist	Not eligible	Did not exist	Did not exist	Did not exist	Did not exist	Did not exist	Dimitris Mougras	7
1933–34	6th (Note: South Group)	Did not exist	Not held	Did not exist	Did not exist	3rd	Did not exist	Did not exist	Did not exist	Did not exist	Did not exist	Sotiris Tziralidis	4
1934–35	Not held	Did not exist	Not held	Did not exist	Did not exist	Not finished	Did not exist	Did not exist	Did not exist	Did not exist	Did not exist		
1935–36	5th	Did not exist	Not held	Did not exist	Did not exist	Not eligible	Did not exist	Did not exist	Did not exist	Did not exist	Did not exist		
1936–37	Did not qualify	Did not exist	Not held	Did not exist	Did not exist	RU	Did not exist	Did not exist	Did not exist	Did not exist	Did not exist		
1937–38	Did not qualify	Did not exist	Not held	Did not exist	Did not exist	RU	Did not exist	Did not exist	Did not exist	Did not exist	Did not exist		
1938–39	W	Did not exist	W	Did not exist	Did not exist	RU	Did not exist	Did not exist	Did not exist	Did not exist	Did not exist	Kleanthis Maropoulos	24+
1939–40	W	Did not exist	SF	Did not exist	Did not exist	W	Did not exist	Did not exist	Did not exist	Did not exist	Did not exist	Kleanthis Maropoulos	25
1940–41	Not held	Did not exist	Not finished	Did not exist	Did not exist	Not finished	Did not exist	Did not exist	Did not exist	Did not exist	Did not exist		
1941–42	Not held	Did not exist	Not held	Did not exist	Did not exist	Not held	Did not exist	Did not exist	Did not exist	Did not exist	Did not exist	—	
1942–43	Not finished	Did not exist	Not held	Did not exist	Did not exist	Not held	Did not exist	Did not exist	Did not exist	Did not exist	Did not exist	—	
1943–44	Not held	Did not exist	Not held	Did not exist	Did not exist	Not held	Did not exist	Did not exist	Did not exist	Did not exist	Did not exist	—	
1944–45	Not held	Did not exist	Not held	Did not exist	Did not exist	Not finished	Did not exist	Did not exist	Did not exist	Did not exist	Did not exist	—	
1945–46	RU	Did not exist	Not held	Did not exist	Did not exist	W	Did not exist	Did not exist	Did not exist	Did not exist	Did not exist	Kleanthis Maropoulos; Tryfon Tzanetis	12
1946–47	4th	Did not exist	R16	Did not exist	Did not exist	W	Did not exist	Did not exist	Did not exist	Did not exist	Did not exist	Xenofon Markopoulos; Kleanthis Maropoulos	9
1947–48	Did not qualify	Did not exist	RU	Did not exist	Did not exist	3rd	Did not exist	Did not exist	Did not exist	Did not exist	Did not exist	Kleanthis Maropoulos	11
1948–49	Did not qualify	Did not exist	W	Did not exist	Did not exist	5th	Did not exist	Did not exist	Did not exist	Did not exist	Did not exist	Xenofon Markopoulos	15
1949–50	Not finished	Did not exist	W	Did not exist	Did not exist	W	Did not exist	Did not exist	Did not exist	Did not exist	Did not exist	Manolis Kountouris	14
1950–51	Did not qualify	Did not exist	QF	Did not exist	Did not exist	RU	Did not exist	Did not exist	Did not exist	Did not exist	Did not exist	Manolis Kountouris	5
1951–52	Not held	Did not exist	SF	Did not exist	Did not exist	RU	Did not exist	Did not exist	Did not exist	Did not exist	Did not exist	Ilias Papageorgiou	13
1952–53	Did not qualify	Did not exist	RU	Did not exist	Did not exist	3rd	Did not exist	Did not exist	Did not exist	Did not exist	Did not exist	Lambis Serafidis	8
1953–54	3rd	Did not exist	R16	Did not exist	Did not exist	RU	Did not exist	Did not exist	Did not exist	Did not exist	Did not exist	Panagiotis Patakas; Andreas Stamatiadis	7
1954–55	Did not qualify	Did not exist	R16	Did not exist	Did not exist	3rd	Did not exist	Did not exist	Did not exist	Did not exist	Did not exist	Giannis Kanakis	7
1955–56	Did not qualify	Did not exist	W	Did not exist	Did not exist	5th	Not eligible	Did not exist	Not eligible	Did not exist	Did not exist	Giannis Chaniotis	8
1956–57	Did not qualify	Did not exist	QF	Did not exist	Did not exist	4th	Not eligible	Did not exist	Not eligible	Did not exist	Did not exist	Giannis Kanakis	12
1957–58	RU	Did not exist	QF	Did not exist	Did not exist	RU	Not eligible	Did not exist	Not eligible	Did not exist	Did not exist	Kostas Nestoridis	22
1958–59	RU	Did not exist	QF	Did not exist	Did not exist	3rd	Not eligible	Did not exist	Not eligible	Did not exist	Did not exist	Kostas Nestoridis	26
1959–60	RU	Did not exist	R7	Did not exist	Did not exist	Not eligible	Not eligible	Did not exist	Not eligible	Did not exist	Did not exist	Kostas Nestoridis	42
1960–61	4th	Did not exist	QF	Did not exist	Did not exist	Not eligible	Not eligible	Not eligible	Not eligible	Did not exist	5th	Kostas Nestoridis	44
1961–62	4th	Did not exist	R16	Did not exist	Did not exist	Not eligible	Not eligible	Not eligible	Not eligible	Did not exist	Not eligible	Kostas Nestoridis	29
1962–63	W	Did not exist	QF	Did not exist	Did not exist	Not eligible	Not eligible	Not eligible	Not eligible	Did not exist	Not eligible	Kostas Nestoridis	28
1963–64	3rd	Did not exist	W	Did not exist	Did not exist	Not eligible	PR	Not eligible	Not eligible	Did not exist	Not eligible	Mimis Papaioannou	34
1964–65	RU	Did not exist	QF	Did not exist	Did not exist	Not eligible	Not eligible	R1	Not eligible	Did not exist	Not eligible	Kostas Nestoridis; Kostas Papageorgiou	20
1965–66	3rd	Did not exist	W	Did not exist	Did not exist	Not eligible	Not eligible	Not eligible	Not eligible	Did not exist	Not eligible	Mimis Papaioannou	29
1966–67	RU	Did not exist	QF	Did not exist	Did not exist	Not eligible	Not eligible	R1	Not eligible	Did not exist	RU	Mimis Papaioannou	22
1967–68	W	Did not exist	SF	Did not exist	Did not exist	Not eligible	Not eligible	Not eligible	Not eligible	Did not exist	Grp	Mimis Papaioannou	21
1968–69	6th	Did not exist	R16	Did not exist	Did not exist	Not eligible	QF	Not eligible	Not eligible	Did not exist	Not eligible	Mimis Papaioannou	27
1969–70	RU	Did not exist	R2	Did not exist	Did not exist	Not eligible	Not eligible	Not eligible	Not eligible	Did not exist	Not eligible	Mimis Papaioannou	19
1970–71	W	Did not exist	SF	Did not exist	Did not exist	Not eligible	Not eligible	Not eligible	R1	Did not exist	Not eligible	Mimis Papaioannou	37
1971–72	3rd	Did not exist	R16	Did not exist	Did not exist	Not eligible	R1	Not eligible	Not eligible	Did not exist	Not eligible	Mimis Papaioannou	17
1972–73	5th	Did not exist	R16	Did not exist	Did not exist	Not eligible	Not eligible	Not eligible	R2	Did not exist	Not eligible	Kostas Nikolaidis	13
1973–74	5th	Did not exist	R16	Did not exist	Did not exist	Not eligible	Not eligible	Not eligible	Not eligible	Did not exist	Not eligible	Tasos Konstantinou	14
1974–75	RU	Did not exist	QF	Did not exist	Did not exist	Not eligible	Not eligible	Not eligible	Not eligible	Did not exist	Not eligible	Walter Wagner	20
1975–76	RU	Did not exist	SF	Did not exist	Did not exist	Not eligible	Not eligible	Not eligible	R2	Did not exist	Not eligible	Georgios Dedes	19
1976–77	4th	Did not exist	R16	Did not exist	Did not exist	Not eligible	Not eligible	Not eligible	SF	Did not exist	Not eligible	Thomas Mavros	21
1977–78	W	Did not exist	W	Did not exist	Did not exist	Not eligible	Not eligible	Not eligible	R2	Did not exist	Not eligible	Thomas Mavros	31
1978–79	W	Did not exist	RU	Did not exist	Did not exist	Not eligible	R2	Not eligible	Not eligible	Did not exist	Not held	Thomas Mavros	40
1979–80	4th	Did not exist	R16	Did not exist	Did not exist	Not eligible	R1	Not eligible	Not eligible	Did not exist	Not eligible	Dušan Bajević	27
1980–81	RU	Did not exist	SF	Did not exist	Did not exist	Not eligible	Not eligible	Not eligible	Not eligible	Did not exist	Grp	Dušan Bajević	15
1981–82	4th	Did not exist	R16	Did not exist	Did not exist	Not eligible	Not eligible	Not eligible	Not eligible	Did not exist	Not eligible	Thomas Mavros	19
1982–83	3rd	Did not exist	W	Did not exist	Did not exist	Not eligible	Not eligible	Not eligible	R1	Did not exist	Not eligible	Thomas Mavros	31
1983–84	7th	Did not exist	R16	Did not exist	Did not exist	Not eligible	Not eligible	R1	Not eligible	Did not exist	Not eligible	Thomas Mavros	17
1984–85	3rd	Did not exist	R1	Did not exist	Did not exist	Not eligible	Not eligible	Not eligible	Not eligible	Did not exist	Not eligible	Thomas Mavros	27
1985–86	3rd	Did not exist	SF	Did not exist	Did not exist	Not eligible	Not eligible	Not eligible	R1	Did not exist	Not eligible	Márton Esterházy	17
1986–87	7th	Did not exist	AR	Did not exist	Did not exist	Not eligible	Not eligible	Not eligible	R1	Did not exist	Not eligible	Jim Patikas	5
1987–88	RU	Did not exist	R16	Not eligible	Did not exist	Not eligible	Not eligible	Not eligible	Not eligible	Did not exist	Not eligible	Henrik Nielsen	23
1988–89	W	Did not exist	R32	Not eligible	Did not exist	Not eligible	Not eligible	Not eligible	R1	Did not exist	Not eligible	Mirosław Okoński	11
1989–90	RU	Did not exist	R32	W	W	Not eligible	R2	Not eligible	Not eligible	Did not exist	Not eligible	Daniel Batista	17
1990–91	3rd	Did not exist	R16	Not held	Not held	Not eligible	Not eligible	Not eligible	Not eligible	Did not exist	Not eligible	Daniel Batista	14
1991–92	W	Did not exist	SF	Not held	Not held	Not eligible	Not eligible	Not eligible	R3	Did not exist	Not eligible	Vasilis Dimitriadis	31
1992–93	W	Did not exist	SF	RU	Not held	Not eligible	R2	Not eligible	Not eligible	Did not exist	Not eligible	Vasilis Dimitriadis	44
1993–94	W	Did not exist	RU	RU	Not held	Not eligible	R1	Not eligible	Not eligible	Did not exist	Not eligible	Alexis Alexandris	30
1994–95	5th	Did not exist	RU	RU	Not held	Not eligible	Grp	Not eligible	Not eligible	Did not exist	Not eligible	Dimitris Saravakos	26
1995–96	RU	Did not exist	W	Not held	Not held	Not eligible	Not eligible	R2	Not eligible	Did not exist	Not held	Vasilios Tsiartas	32
1996–97	RU	Did not exist	W	W	Not held	Not eligible	Not eligible	QF	Not eligible	Did not exist	Not held	Christos Kostis	24
1997–98	3rd	Did not exist	R32	Not held	Not held	Not eligible	Not eligible	QF	Not eligible	Did not exist	Not held	Demis Nikolaidis	21
1998–99	RU	Did not exist	R1	Not held	Not held	Not eligible	Not eligible	Not eligible	R1	Did not exist	Not held	Demis Nikolaidis	28
1999–2000	3rd	Did not exist	W	Not held	Not held	Not eligible	QR3	Not held	R3	Did not exist	Not held	Demis Nikolaidis	36
2000–01	3rd	Did not exist	R16	Not held	Not held	Not eligible	Not eligible	Not held	R4	Did not exist	Not held	Demis Nikolaidis	25
2001–02	RU	Did not exist	W	Not held	Not held	Not eligible	Not eligible	Not held	R4	Did not exist	Not held	Demis Nikolaidis	28
2002–03	3rd	Did not exist	SF	Not held	Not held	Not eligible	Grp	Not held	R4	Did not exist	Not held	Demis Nikolaidis	16
2003–04	4th	Did not exist	SF	Not held	Not held	Not eligible	Grp	Not held	Not eligible	Did not exist	Not held	Nikos Liberopoulos	18
2004–05	3rd	Did not exist	SF	Not held	Not held	Not eligible	Not eligible	Not held	Grp	Did not exist	Not held	Alessandro Soares	15
2005–06	RU	Did not exist	RU	Not held	Not held	Not eligible	Not eligible	Not held	R1	Did not exist	Not held	Nikos Liberopoulos	16
2006–07	RU	Did not exist	R32	Not held	Not held	Not eligible	Grp	Not held	R32	Did not exist	Not held	Nikos Liberopoulos	20
2007–08	RU	RU	R16	Not eligible	Not held	Not eligible	QR3	Not held	R32	Did not exist	Not held	Ismael Blanco	21
2008–09	4th	RU	RU	Not held	Not held	Not eligible	Not eligible	Not held	QR2	Did not exist	Not held	Ismael Blanco	24
2009–10	4th	RU	R32	Not held	Not held	Not eligible	Not eligible	Not held	Grp	Did not exist	Not held	Ismael Blanco	13
2010–11	3rd	3rd	W	Not held	Not held	Not eligible	Not eligible	Not held	Grp	Did not exist	Not held	Ismael Blanco	15
2011–12	5th	RU	R16	Not held	Not held	Not eligible	Not eligible	Not held	Grp	Did not exist	Not held	Leonardo	13
2012–13	15th	Not eligible	R32	Not held	Not held	Not eligible	Not eligible	Not held	Not eligible	Did not exist	Not held	Taxiarchis Fountas	4
2013–14	1st (Note: Football League 2 (Group 6).)	Not eligible	QF (Note: Football League 2 Cup.)	Not held	Not held	Not eligible	Not eligible	Not held	Not eligible	Did not exist	Not held	Alexandre D'Acol	21
2014–15	1st (Note: Football League (South Group).)	1st (Note: Football League.)	QF	Not held	Not held	Not eligible	Not eligible	Not held	Not eligible	Did not exist	Not held	Christos Aravidis	20
2015–16	3rd	3rd	W	Not held	Not held	Not eligible	Not eligible	Not held	Not eligible	Did not exist	Not held	Ronald Vargas; Diego Buonanotte; Christos Aravidis	11
2016–17	4th	W	RU	Not held	Not held	Not eligible	Not eligible	Not held	QR3	Did not exist	Not held	Tomas Pekhart	12
2017–18	W	Not held	RU	Not held	Not held	Not eligible	QR3	Not held	R32	Did not exist	Not held	Lazaros Christodoulopoulos	16
2018–19	3rd	Not held	RU	Not held	Not held	Not eligible	Grp	Not held	Not eligible	Did not exist	Not held	Ezequiel Ponce	21
2019–20	3rd	3rd	RU	Not held	Not held	Not eligible	Not eligible	Not held	PO	Did not exist	Not held	Nélson Oliveira	16
2020–21	3rd	4th	SF	Not held	Not held	Not eligible	Not eligible	Not held	Grp	Did not exist	Not held	Karim Ansarifard	14
2021–22	3rd	5th	QF	Not held	Not held	Not eligible	Not eligible	Not held	Not eligible	QR2	Not held	Sergio Araujo	12
2022–23	RU	W	W	Not held	Not held	Not eligible	Not eligible	Not held	Not eligible	Not eligible	Not held	Levi García	18
2023–24	RU	RU	R16	Not held	Not held	Not eligible	PO	Not held	Grp	Not eligible	Not held	Ezequiel Ponce	16
2024–25	RU	4th	SF	Not held	Not held	Not eligible	Not eligible	Not held	Not eligible	QR3	Not held	Levi García	10
2025–26	W	W	QF	Not eligible	Not held	Not eligible	Not eligible	Not held	Not eligible	QF	Not held	Luka Jović	21
2026–27	TBA	TBA	TBA	RU	Not held	Not eligible	LP	Not held	Not eligible	Not eligible	Not held		

== History of squad numbers ==
Regular squad numbers did not exist before the 1997–98 season.

Season	1	2	3	4	5	6	7	8	9	10	11
1997–98	Atmatsidis	Macheridis	Kasapis	Doboș	Kostenoglou	Vlachos	Maladenis	Savevski	Koutoulas	Kostis	Nikolaidis
1998–99	Atmatsidis	Lakis	Markos	—	Babunski	Kostenoglou	Maladenis	Savevski	Zouboulis	Iliev / Wreh	Nikolaidis
1999–2000	Atmatsidis	Dellas	Petrić	—	Kostenoglou	Markos	Maladenis	Savevski	Bjeković	Ćirić	Nikolaidis
2000–01	Atmatsidis	Dellas	Ferrugem	Donchev	Kostenoglou	Zagorakis	Maladenis	Savevski	Kostis	Tsiartas	Nikolaidis
2001–02	Atmatsidis	Maricá	Ferrugem	Gamarra	Kostenoglou	Zagorakis	Maladenis	—	Mielcarski	Tsiartas	Nikolaidis
2002–03	Atmatsidis	Borbokis	—	—	Kostenoglou	Zagorakis	Maladenis	Kreek	Solakis	Tsiartas	Nikolaidis
2003–04	Michailidis	Borbokis	Petkov	—	Kostenoglou	Zagorakis	Maladenis	Kreek	Okkas	Tsiartas	—
2004–05	Michailidis	Kappos	Malbaša	Bruno Alves	Kostenoglou	Maistrellis	Soares	Rusev	Petkov	Konstantinidis	Kampantais
2005–06	Sorrentino	—	Malbaša	—	Cirillo	Alexopoulos	Soares	Sapanis	Komvolidis	Kone	Venhlynskyi
2006–07	Kafes	—	—	Moras	Cirillo	Alexopoulos	Kyriakidis	Sapanis	Delibašić	Kone	Manduca
2007–08	Kafes	Edson Ratinho	Arruabarrena	Geraldo Alves	Dellas	Alexopoulos	Pappas	Nsaliwa	Kapetanos	Rivaldo	Manduca
2008–09	Kafes	Edson Ratinho	—	Geraldo Alves	Majstorović	Alexopoulos	Juanfran	Nsaliwa	Edinho	Rivaldo / Djebbour	Manduca
2009–10	Kafes	C. Araujo	Hersi	Geraldo Alves	Majstorović	Alexopoulos	Juanfran	Nsaliwa	Leonardo	Djebbour	Manduca
2010–11	Kafes	Patsatzoglou	Nasuti	Manolas	Dellas	Mateos	Guerreiro	Jahić	Leonardo	Djebbour	Míchel
2011–12	Kafes	Kontoes	Helgason	Manolas	Dellas	Cala	Guerreiro	Beleck	Leonardo	José Carlos	Sialmas
2012–13	Konstantopoulos	Kontoes	Yago	—	—	Cordero	Katsikokeris	Katidis	Tsitas	Guerreiro	Pavlis
2013–14	AEK Athens did not use regular squad numbers since they were an amateur club.										
2014–15	Vouras	Soiledis	Petavrakis	Rovas	Lampropoulos	Cordero	Barbosa	D'Acol	Brečević	Anakoglou	Platellas
2015–16	Baroja	Soiledis	Petavrakis	Arzo	Lampropoulos	Cordero	Barbosa	Simões	Vargas	Anakoglou	Platellas
2016–17	Barkas	Vasilantonopoulos	Díaz	Vranješ	Lampropoulos	Lescott / Ajdarević	Barbosa / Christodoulopoulos	Simões	Almeida	Vargas	Platellas / S. Araujo
2017–18	Barkas	Bakakis	Lopes	Vranješ	Lampropoulos	Ajdarević	Christodoulopoulos	Simões	Almeida / Giakoumakis	Livaja	S. Araujo
2018–19	Barkas	Bakakis	Lopes	Oikonomou	Lampropoulos	Ajdarević / Krstičić	Albanis	Simões	Giakoumakis	Livaja	Gianniotas
2019–20	Barkas	Bakakis	Lopes	Oikonomou	Szymański	Krstičić	Verde	Simões	Giakoumakis	Livaja	Deletić / S. Araujo
2020–21	Tsintotas	Bakakis	Lopes	Szymański	Nedelcearu	Krstičić	—	Simões	Levi García	Livaja	Ansarifard
2021–22	Tsintotas	Bakakis	Lopes / Mohammadi	Szymański	Svarnas	Le Tallec	Amrabat	Simões	Levi García	Ansarifard	S. Araujo
2022–23	Stanković	Moukoudi	Mohammadi	Szymański	Amrabat	Jønsson	Levi García	Gaćinović	Van Weert	Zuber	S. Araujo
2023–24	Stanković	Moukoudi	Mohammadi	Szymański	Amrabat	Jønsson	Levi García	Gaćinović	Van Weert	Zuber	S. Araujo
2024–25	Strakosha	Moukoudi	Pilios	Szymański	Amrabat	Jønsson	Levi García	Gaćinović	Lamela	Zuber	Koïta
2025–26	Strakosha	Moukoudi	Pilios	Grujić	—	Jønsson	Kutesa	Gaćinović	Jović	João Mário	Koïta
2026–27	Strakosha	Moukoudi	Pilios	—	Alexiou	Kairinen	Kutesa	Gaćinović	Jović	Zubkov	Koïta

== Seasons overview ==
Season	League	Cup	Other	Manager	Roster
1924–25	Did not exist	Did not exist	EPSA: 2nd	—	Asderis, Ieremiadis, Chatzopoulos, Karagiannidis, Milas, Kitsos, Kechagias, Ippiadis, Baltas, Dimopoulos (C), Paraskevas, Kokkinakis, Samaras, D. Michailidis, K. Michailidis, Mougras, Christidis, Askitopoulos, Georgiadis, Armash, Kechagioglou
1925–26	Did not exist	Did not exist	EPSA: 3rd	—	Asderis, Ieremiadis, Chatzopoulos, Milas, Kitsos, Kechagias, Ippiadis, Baltas, Dimopoulos (C), Paraskevas, Kokkinakis, Samaras, Michailidis, Mougras, Christidis, Georgiadis, Armash, Kechagioglou, Curat, N. Baltas^{W}, Konstantinidis^{W}
1926–27	Did not exist	Did not exist	EPSA: 2nd^{*}	—	Asderis, Ieremiadis, Milas, Kechagias, Dimopoulos (C), Paraskevas, Christidis, Georgiadis, Armash, Kechagioglou, Baltas, Konstantinidis, Negrepontis, Iliaskos, Negris, Tsirigotis, Giamalis, Kargiotakis
1927–28	Withdrew	Did not exist	EPSA: Withdrew	Schweng	Asderis, Ieremiadis, Kechagias, Dimopoulos (C), Paraskevas, Kechagioglou, Baltas, Konstantinidis, Negrepontis, Iliaskos, Negris, Tsirigotis, Giamalis, Kargiotakis, Mallios, Emmanouilidis, P. Dimitriadis, Th. Dimitriadis, Avanos, Étienne, Missios, Delamitsas, Seimanidis, Seisoglou
1928–29	Not held	Did not exist	EPSA: 2nd	Schweng	Asderis, Ieremiadis (C), Dimopoulos, Kechagias, Paraskevas, Baltas, Konstantinidis, K. Negrepontis, Iliaskos, Negris, Tsirigotis, Giamalis, Kargiotakis, Mallios, Emmanouilidis, P. Dimitriadis, Dimitriadis, Avanos, Delamitsas, Vitsigounakis, G. Delikaris, Th. Delikaris, F. Negrepontis, Patroklos, Sidiropoulos, Kamaravos, Argyropoulos, Chalkidis, Fylaktos, Mougras, Kontopoulos, Tsichlos, Vavasis, Chatzigeorgiou, Ribas^{W}
1929–30	Did not qualify	Did not exist	EPSA: 2nd	Schweng	Asderis, Ieremiadis (C), Dimopoulos, Kechagias, Paraskevas, Baltas, Konstantinidis, Negrepontis, Iliaskos, Negris, Tsirigotis, Giamalis, Kargiotakis, Mallios, Emmanouilidis, P. Dimitriadis, Dimitriadis, Delamitsas, Vitsigounakis, G. Delikaris, Th. Delikaris, Patroklos, Argyropoulos, Chalkidis, Mougras, Chatzigeorgiou, Ribas, Agathoklis, Pantermalis
1930–31	4th	Did not exist	EPSA: 2nd	Schweng	Asderis, Ieremiadis (C), Dimopoulos, Paraskevas, Baltas, Konstantinidis, Negrepontis, Iliaskos, Tsirigotis, Giamalis, Mallios, Emmanouilidis, Dimitriadis, Delimitsas, G. Delikaris, Th. Delikaris, Patroklos, Argyropoulos, Chalkidis, Mougras, Chatzigeorgiou, Ribas, Agathoklis, Pantermalis, Petridis, Elpis, Daispangos, Averof, Alakiozoglou, Gogornas, Koulouvardis, S. Tziralidis, A. Tziralidis, Oikonomou, Tsibidis, Klaras, Panourgias, Karatzas, Lagoudakis, Psallis, Galić, Chrysovelidis, Pantelidis, Cabolio
1931–32	8th	W	Not eligible	Rauchmal	Ieremiadis (C), Baltas, Konstantinidis, Negrepontis, Iliaskos, Giamalis, Mallios, Emmanouilidis, Dimitriadis, Delimitsas, G. Delikaris, Th. Delikaris, Patroklos, Argyropoulos, Mougras, Ribas, Agathoklis, Petridis, Daispangos, Averof, Alakiozoglou, Gogornas, Koulouvardis, S. Tziralidis, A. Tziralidis, Tsibidis, Karatzas, Psallis, Louvaris, Diamantakos, Andreadis, Aliprantis, Moumalidis, Drollas, Paschopoulos, Kritikos^{W}
1932–33	3rd	R2	Not eligible	Asderis	Konstantinidis, Iliaskos, Mallios, Emmanouilidis, Dimitriadis, Delimitsas, G. Delikaris, Th. Delikaris, Patroklos, Argyropoulos, Mougras, Ribas, Agathoklis, Petridis, Daispangos, Averof, Alakiozoglou, Gogornas, S. Tziralidis, A. Tziralidis, Tsibidis, Karatzas, Louvaris, Andreadis, Drollas, A. Kritikos, Papaiordanidis, I. Kritikos, Apalopoulos, Kolos, A. Fotopoulos
1933–34	6th (South Group)	Not held	EPSA: 3rd	Negrepontis	Konstantinidis, Mallios, Dimitriadis, G. Delikaris, Th. Delikaris, Patroklos, Argyropoulos, Mougras, Ribas, Agathoklis, Daispangos, Averof, Alakiozoglou, Gogornas, S. Tziralidis, A. Tziralidis, Tsibidis, Karatzas, Louvaris, Andreadis, Drollas, Klaras, Papaiordanidis, Kritikos, A. Fotopoulos, G. Papadopoulos, Magiras, Pavlis, Papadopoulos, Abatzopoulos, Kampantais, Tobazis, Loutsidis, Rallidis, Chatzistavridis^{W}
1934–35	Not held	Not held	EPSA: Not finished	Negrepontis	Dimitriadis, Patroklos, Mougras, Argyropoulos, Ribas, Averof, Karatzas, Louvaris, Drollas, Papaiordanidis, Kritikos, A. Fotopoulos, G. Papadopoulos, Magiras, Pavlis, Papadopoulos, Kampantais, Loutsidis, Chatzistavridis, Spyridis, Tzouvalis, Dikaiopoulos^{W}
1935–36	5th	Not held	Not eligible	Negrepontis	Dimitriadis, Patroklos, Mougras, Ribas, Averof, Papaiordanidis, Papadopoulos, Magiras, Pavlis, Kampantais, Chatzistavridis, Spyridis, Dikaiopoulos, Tzanetis, Maropoulos, Kontoulis, Manettas, Sklavounos, Seltsikas, Athanasiadis, Kosmidis, Charistou, Anastasiou, Serafidis, Filis
1936–37	Did not qualify	Not held	EPSA: 2nd	Asderis	Patroklos, Mougras, Ribas, Averof, Papadopoulos, Magiras, Pavlis, Kampantais, Chatzistavridis, Spyridis, Dikaiopoulos, Tzanetis, Maropoulos, Kontoulis, Manettas, Sklavounos, Seltsikas, Athanasiadis, Filis, Christodoulou, Vasiliou, Sofianopoulos
1937–38	Did not qualify	Not held	EPSA: 2nd	Negrepontis	Patroklos, Mougras, Ribas, Papadopoulos, Magiras, Pavlis, Kampantais, Chatzistavridis, Spyridis, Tzanetis, Maropoulos, Kontoulis, V. Manettas, Sklavounos, Seltsikas, Filis, Christodoulou, Vasiliou, Sofianopoulos, Gasparis, K. Manettas, Dikaiopoulos
1938–39	W	W	EPSA: 2nd	Negrepontis	Mougras, Ribas (C), Papadopoulos, Magiras, Pavlis, Kampantais, Chatzistavridis, Spyridis, Tzanetis, Maropoulos, Kontoulis, V. Manettas, Sklavounos, Seltsikas, Filis, Christodoulou, Vasiliou, Gasparis, K. Manettas, Dikaiopoulos, Delavinias, Markopoulos, Kritikos, Chatzipanos, Tsouvalis, Nikolois, Kokotsis, Koutsoulieris, Tsakalos
1939–40	W	SF	EPSA: W	Negrepontis	Ribas, Papadopoulos (C), Magiras, Pavlis, Kampantais, Chatzistavridis, Spyridis, Tzanetis, Maropoulos, Kontoulis, V. Manettas, Sklavounos, Seltsikas, Filis, Christodoulou, Vasiliou, Gasparis, K. Manettas, Delavinias, Markopoulos, Nikolois, Kokotsis, Koutsoulieris, Kytidis
1940–41	Not held	Not finished	EPSA: Not finished	Negrepontis	Ribas, Papadopoulos (C), Magiras, Pavlis, Chatzistavridis, Spyridis, Tzanetis, Maropoulos, Kontoulis, V. Manettas, Seltsikas, Christodoulou, Vasiliou, Gasparis, K. Manettas, Delavinias, Markopoulos, Nikolois, Koutsoulieris
1941–42	Not held	Not held	Not held	Negrepontis	Ribas, Papadopoulos (C), Magiras, Pavlis, Chatzistavridis, Spyridis, Tzanetis, Maropoulos, Kontoulis, Manettas, Seltsikas, Christodoulou, Vasiliou, Gasparis, Delavinias, Markopoulos, Nikolois, Koutsoulieris
1942–43	Not finished	Not held	Not held	Negrepontis	Ribas, Papadopoulos (C), Magiras, Pavlis, Chatzistavridis, Spyridis, Tzanetis, Maropoulos, Kontoulis, Manettas, Seltsikas, Christodoulou, Vasiliou, Gasparis, Delavinias, Markopoulos, Nikolois, Koutsoulieris
1943–44	Not held	Not held	Not held	Negrepontis	Ribas, Papadopoulos (C), Magiras, Pavlis, Chatzistavridis, Spyridis, Tzanetis, Maropoulos, Kontoulis, Manettas, Seltsikas, Christodoulou, Vasiliou, Gasparis, Delavinias, Markopoulos, Nikolois, Koutsoulieris
1944–45	Not held	Not held	EPSA: Not finished	Negrepontis	Ribas, Papadopoulos (C), Magiras, Pavlis, Spyridis, Tzanetis, Maropoulos, Manettas, Seltsikas, Christodoulou, Vasiliou, Gasparis, Delavinias, Markopoulos, Nikolois, Koutsoulieris
1945–46	R/U	Not held	EPSA: W	Negrepontis	C. Ribas, Papadopoulos (C), Magiras, Pavlis, Spyridis, Tzanetis, Maropoulos, Seltsikas, Gasparis, Delavinias, Markopoulos, Nikolois, Koutsoulieris, Papatheodorou, Arvanitis, Vlantis, Nisiadis, Adamidis, Manolakakis, Saratsoglou, Sidiropoulos, Ribas, Karagiaouris, Aivatzidis, Gerardos
1946–47	4th	16	EPSA: W	Negrepontis	Ribas, G. Papadopoulos (C), Magiras, Pavlis, Spyridis, Tzanetis, Maropoulos, Gasparis, Delavinias, Markopoulos, Nikolois, Papatheodorou, Arvanitis, Vlantis, Nisiadis, Adamidis, Manolakakis, Saratsoglou, Serafidis, Isangeleas, Chatzivardeas, Papantoniou, Voulantzeris, Papadopoulos, Karapiperis, Pantelidis
1947–48	Did not qualify	R/U	EPSA: 3rd	Negrepontis	Ribas, G. Papadopoulos (C), Magiras, Pavlis, Tzanetis, Maropoulos, Gasparis, Delavinias, Markopoulos, Papatheodorou, Arvanitis, Vlantis, Nisiadis, Adamidis, Saratsoglou, Serafidis, Isangeleas, Chatzivardeas, Papantoniou, Papadopoulos, Pantelidis, Emmanouilidis, Kountouris, Tsamis, Paleologos, Poulimas, Tsavos, Vaptismas, Mitrakis
1948–49	Did not qualify	W	EPSA: 5th	Beby	Magiras, Pavlis, Tzanetis, Maropoulos (C), Gasparis, Delavinias, Markopoulos, Papatheodorou, Arvanitis, Vlantis, Nisiadis, Adamidis, Isangeleas, Chatzivardeas, Papantoniou, Pantelidis, Emmanouilidis, Kountouris, Poulimas, Tsavos, Patakas, Poulis, Parayios, Lazaridis, Tavlas, Kanakis
1949–50	Not finished	W	EPSA: W	Beby	Magiras, Pavlis, Tzanetis, Maropoulos (C), Gasparis, Delavinias, Markopoulos, Papatheodorou, Arvanitis, Vlantis, Nisiadis, Chatzivardeas, Emmanouilidis, Kountouris, Tsavos, Patakas, Poulis, Parayios, Lazaridis, Tavlas, Kanakis, Darakis, Bratsos, Konstantinidis, Basteas, Oikonomou, Sevastiadis, Iosifidis, Kalogiannis, Saratsoglou, Roussakis
1950–51	Did not qualify	QF	EPSA: 2nd	Beby; Tzanetis	Tzanetis, Maropoulos (C), Delavinias, Markopoulos, Papatheodorou, Arvanitis, Vlantis, Emmanouilidis, Kountouris, Tsavos, Patakas, Poulis, Parayios, Lazaridis, Kanakis, Darakis, Iosifidis, Sevastiadis, Tzavaras, Papageorgiou
1951–52	Not held	SF	EPSA: 2nd	Magnozzi	Maropoulos (C), Delavinias, Papatheodorou, Arvanitis, Emmanouilidis, Kountouris, Tsavos, Poulis, Parayios, Lazaridis, Kanakis, Serafidis, Darakis, Tzavaras, Papageorgiou, Bratsos, Stamatiadis, Mouratidis, Inglesis, Arsenikos
1952–53	Did not qualify	R/U	EPSA: 3rd	Magnozzi	Delavinias, Papatheodorou, Arvanitis (C), Emmanouilidis, Kountouris, Poulis, Parayios, Lazaridis, Kanakis, Serafidis, Darakis, Patakas, Papageorgiou, Bratsos, Stamatiadis, Mouratidis, Inglesis, Arsenikos, Manesis
1953–54	3rd	16	EPSA: 2nd	Daispangos	Delavinias, Papatheodorou, Arvanitis, Emmanouilidis, Kountouris, Poulis (C), Parayios, Lazaridis, Kanakis, L. Serafidis, Patakas, Papageorgiou, Bratsos, Stamatiadis, G. Mouratidis, Inglesis, Arsenikos, S. Serafidis, Kreouzas, Tsangaris, Adamantidis, Melissis, M. Mouratidis, Papadimitriou, Panteliadis, Triantafyllou
1954–55	Did not qualify	16	EPSA: 3rd	Daispangos; Crawford	Papatheodorou, Emmanouilidis, Kountouris, Poulis (C), Parayios, Lazaridis, Kanakis, Patakas, Papageorgiou, Bratsos, Stamatiadis, Mouratidis, Arsenikos, Serafidis, Kreouzas, Tsangaris, Adamantidis, Melissis, Adamopoulos, Kalyvopoulos, Kollias, Triantafyllou, Tapsis, Papageorgiou, Vamvakopoulos
1955–56	Did not qualify	W	EPSA: 5th^{*}	Crawford; Negrepontis	Papatheodorou, Emmanouilidis, Kountouris, Poulis (C), Parayios, Kanakis, Stamatiadis, Arsenikos, Serafidis, Kreouzas, Tsangaris, Adamantidis, Melissis, Triantafyllou, Adamopoulos, Kalyvopoulos, Kollias, Nestoridis, Chaniotis, Kourtidis, Zografos, Karakatsanis, Voglis, Lianos, Kornilakis, Ampos
1956–57	Did not qualify	QF	EPSA: 4th	Negrepontis; Tzanetis	Emmanouilidis, Poulis (C), Parayios, Kanakis, Stamatiadis, Serafidis, Kreouzas, Tsangaris, Adamantidis, Melissis, Adamopoulos, Nestoridis, Chaniotis, Kourtidis, Zografos, Karakatsanis, Voglis, Lianos, Ampos, Vernezis, Polyzos, Tsanoulas, Kefalopoulos, Arvanitis, Papapostolou, Moschoutis, Anastasiadis, Chatzimichail
1957–58	R/U	QF	EPSA: 2nd	Tzanetis	Emmanouilidis, Poulis (C), Kanakis, Stamatiadis, Serafidis, Kreouzas, Tsangaris, Adamantidis, Melissis, Adamopoulos, Nestoridis, Chaniotis, Kourtidis, Zografos, Ampos, Vernezis, Polyzos, Tsanoulas, Papapostolou, Moschoutis, Anastasiadis, Chatzimichail, Gavanas, Giafaloglou, Petridis, Antzoulatos, Argyropoulos, Asimakopoulos, Karalis, Fakis, Chrysakis, Christou, Temponeras
1958–59	R/U	QF	EPSA: 3rd	Martini; Negrepontis	Emmanouilidis, Poulis, Kanakis (C), Stamatiadis, Serafidis, Tsangaris, Adamantidis, Melissis, Nestoridis, Chaniotis, Kourtidis, Zografos, Ampos, Vernezis, Polyzos, Tsanoulas, Papapostolou, Anastasiadis, Chatzimichail, Gavanas, Giafaloglou, Petridis, Argyropoulos, Fakis, Anastasiou, Samaras, Sismanis
1959–60	R/U	32	—	Aurednik	Emmanouilidis, Kanakis (C), Stamatiadis, Serafidis, Tsangaris, Melissis, Nestoridis, Zografos, Ampos, Vernezis, Polyzos, Tsanoulas, Papapostolou, Anastasiadis, Gavanas, Petridis, Argyropoulos, Fakis, Samaras, Sismanis, Sofianidis, Marditsis, Demiris, Dimitriou, Diakakis, Stamatelopoulos
1960–61	4th	QF	BC: 5th	Aurednik; Tzanetis	Emmanouilidis, Stamatiadis (C), Serafidis, Melissis, Nestoridis, Ampos, Vernezis, Polyzos, Tsanoulas, Papapostolou, Anastasiadis, Gavanas, Petridis, Argyropoulos, Fakis, Sofianidis, Marditsis, Demiris, Dimitriou, Diakakis, Stamatelopoulos, Gouvas, Tsachouridis, Pomonis, Daispangos, Tzaneras, Zagotsis, Skevofilakas^{W}
1961–62	4th	16	—	Tzanetis	Stamatiadis (C), Serafidis, Nestoridis, Ampos, Vernezis, Papapostolou, Anastasiadis, Petridis, Argyropoulos, Fakis, Sofianidis, Marditsis, Demiris, Stamatelopoulos, Gouvas, Tsachouridis, Pomonis, Daispangos, Tzaneras, Zagotsis, Skevofilakas, Zagylos, Krystallis, Vavaleros
1962–63	W	QF	—	Csaknády	Stamatiadis (C), Serafidis, Nestoridis, Vernezis, Papapostolou, Anastasiadis, Petridis, Sofianidis, Marditsis, Stamatelopoulos, Gouvas, Tsachouridis, Pomonis, Zagotsis, Skevofilakas, Zagylos, Krystallis, Papaioannou, Kanellopoulos, Koulidis, Ibrahim, Petrakis, Klikopoulos, Skafidas, Doukas, Spyropoulos
1963–64	3rd	W	EC: PR	Müller	Stamatiadis (C), Serafidis, Nestoridis, Vernezis, Papapostolou, Anastasiadis, Petridis, Sofianidis, Marditsis, Tsachouridis, Pomonis, Skevofilakas, Papaioannou, Kanellopoulos, Koulidis, Petrakis, Theofanidis, Papageorgiou, Tasinos, Charalampidis, Simigdalas, Stasinopoulos, Sevastopoulos, Maniateas, Yordan^{W}
1964–65	R/U	QF	CWC: R1	Kokotović	Stamatiadis (C), Serafidis, Nestoridis, Vernezis, Papapostolou, Petridis, Sofianidis, Pomonis, Skevofilakas, Papaioannou, Kanellopoulos, Petrakis, Theofanidis, Papageorgiou, Tasinos, Simigdalas, Stasinopoulos, Maniateas, Yordan, Balopoulos, Lefter, Kefalidis, Frogoudakis
1965–66	3rd	W	—	Tzanetis	Stamatiadis (C), Serafidis, Nestoridis, Vernezis, Papapostolou, Petridis, Sofianidis, Pomonis, Skevofilakas, Papaioannou, Petrakis, Papageorgiou, Tasinos, Simigdalas, Maniateas, Yordan, Balopoulos, Kefalidis, Frogoudakis, Karafeskos, Vasiliou, Nikolaidis, Ventouris, Antoniou, Stathopoulos^{W}
1966–67	R/U	QF	CWC: R1; BC: R/U	Tzanetis; Magiras; Csaknády	Stamatiadis (C), Serafidis, Petridis, Sofianidis, Pomonis, Skevofilakas, Papaioannou, Petrakis, Papageorgiou, Simigdalas, Maniateas, Tasinos,^{W} Yordan, Balopoulos, Kefalidis, Frogoudakis, Karafeskos, Vasiliou, Nikolaidis, Sevastopoulos^{W}, Ventouris, Stathopoulos, Mastrakoulis, Exarchidis, Konstantinidis^{W}
1967–68	W	SF	BC: Grp	Csaknády	Stamatiadis (C), Serafidis, Sofianidis, Pomonis, Skevofilakas, Papaioannou, Papageorgiou, Simigdalas, Maniateas, Yordan, Balopoulos, Kefalidis, Frogoudakis, Karafeskos, Vasiliou, Nikolaidis, Ventouris, Stathopoulos, Mastrakoulis, Exarchidis, Konstantinidis, Kyrmizas, Stavrou
1968–69	6th	16	EC: QF	Stanković	Stamatiadis (C), Serafidis, Sofianidis, Pomonis, Skevofilakas, Papaioannou, Papageorgiou, Simigdalas, Maniateas, Yordan, Balopoulos, Kefalidis, Frogoudakis, Karafeskos, Vasiliou, Nikolaidis, Ventouris, Stathopoulos, Exarchidis, Konstantinidis, Sevastopoulos, Kyrmizas, Stavrou, Spyropoulos, Antonopoulos, Stavridis, Karapoulitidis, Lavaridis, Karakidis, Pesiridis, Kokkinos^{W}
1969–70	R/U	R2	—	Stanković	Serafidis, Pomonis, Skevofilakas, Papaioannou (C), Balopoulos, Kefalidis, Frogoudakis, Karafeskos, Vasiliou, Nikolaidis, Ventouris, Stathopoulos, Konstantinidis, Stavrou, Spyropoulos, Stavridis, Karapoulitidis, Lavaridis, Pesiridis, Toskas, Kachris, Chanios, Palasidis, Theodoridis, Sarris, Psychogios, Papaemmanouil, Triantafyllou
1970–71	W	SF	ICFC: R1	Stanković	Serafidis, Pomonis, Skevofilakas, Papaioannou (C), Kefalidis, Karafeskos, Nikolaidis, Ventouris, Stathopoulos, Konstantinidis, Karapoulitidis, Lavaridis, Toskas, Kachris, Chanios, Palasidis, Theodoridis, Psychogios, Papaemmanouil, Triantafyllou, Pachnis, Avramidis, Liakouris
1971–72	3rd	16	EC: R1	Stanković	Serafidis, Pomonis, Skevofilakas, Papaioannou (C), Kefalidis, Karafeskos, Nikolaidis, Ventouris, Stathopoulos, Konstantinidis, Karapoulitidis, Lavaridis, Toskas, Kachris, Chanios, Theodoridis, Triantafyllou, Papaemmanouil, Nikolaou, Tanidis, Psimogiannos, Silivistras, Istorios
1972–73	5th	16	UC: R2	Stanković; Chatzimichail; Bingham	Pomonis, Papaioannou (C), Karafeskos, Nikolaidis, Stathopoulos, Konstantinidis, Karapoulitidis, Lavaridis, Toskas, Theodoridis, Triantafyllou, Nikolaou, Tanidis, Psimogiannos, Istorios, Errea, Dandelis, Lellis, Makos, Ravousis, Zerr, Vicente, Konstantinou, Stergioudas, Tsamis, Karypidis
1973–74	5th	16	—	Anderson; Chatzimichail	Papaioannou (C), Karafeskos, Stathopoulos, Karapoulitidis, Lavaridis, Toskas, Theodoridis, Nikolaou, Tanidis, Psimogiannos, Errea, Makos, Ravousis, Konstantinou, Stergioudas, Tsamis, Karypidis, Kontopoulos, Karoulias, Kypritidis, Zarzopoulos, Stefanidis, Panagiotopoulos, Sidiropoulos, Karachisaridis, Fanìs, Papadopoulos
1974–75	R/U	QF	—	Fadrhonc	Papaioannou (C), Lavaridis, Toskas, Theodoridis, Nikolaou, Errea, Makos, Ravousis, Konstantinou, Stergioudas, Tsamis, Kontopoulos, Karoulias, Zarzopoulos, Stefanidis, Sidiropoulos, Fanìs, Papadopoulos, Timotheou, Wagner, Zahnleiter, Daditsos, Ardizoglou, Dedes, Skrekis, Theofilopoulos
1975–76	R/U	SF	UC: R2	Fadrhonc	Papaioannou (C), Lavaridis, Toskas, Theodoridis, Nikolaou, Ravousis, Konstantinou, Stergioudas, Tsamis, Karoulias, Zarzopoulos, Stefanidis, Sidiropoulos, Papadopoulos, Timotheou, Wagner, Zahnleiter, Ardizoglou, Dedes, Skrekis
1976–77	4th	16	UC: SF	Fadrhonc	Papaioannou (C), Toskas, Theodoridis, Nikolaou, Ravousis, Konstantinou, Stergioudas, Tsamis, Zarzopoulos, Sidiropoulos, L. Papadopoulos, Wagner, Zahnleiter, Ardizoglou, Dedes, Skrekis, Mavros, Christidis, Intzoglou, Nikoloudis, A. Papadopoulos, Vlantis^{W}, Outsikas^{W}, Xenos^{W}, Michalas^{W}
1977–78	W	W	UC: R2	Fadrhonc; Stamatiadis; Čajkovski	Papaioannou (C), Toskas, Theodoridis, Nikolaou, Ravousis, Konstantinou, Stergioudas, Tsamis, Sidiropoulos, Papadopoulos, Ardizoglou, Mavros, Christidis, Intzoglou, Nikoloudis, Vlantis, F. Outsikas, Damianidis, Vlachonikolis, Bajević, Mousouris, Viera, Ikonomopoulos, Alafogiannis, Kotidis, Papatheodorou, Saxanidis, Stylianopoulos, Apostolopoulos, Kalaitzidis, Zografos, Kallinteroglou, Boulmentis, Stafylas, G. Outsikas
1978–79	W	R/U	EC: R2	Puskás; Stamatiadis	Papaioannou, Toskas, Nikolaou (C), Ravousis, Konstantinou, Stergioudas, Tsamis, Papadopoulos, Ardizoglou, Mavros, Christidis, Intzoglou, Nikoloudis, Vlantis, Damianidis, Bajević, Mousouris, Viera, Ikonomopoulos, Stylianopoulos, Apostolopoulos, Kalaitzidis, Domazos, Kotsos, Kokkinopoulos
1979–80	4th	16	EC: R1	Stessl; Papapostolou	Nikolaou (C), Ravousis, Konstantinou, Stergioudas, Tsamis, Ardizoglou, Mavros, Christidis, Intzoglou, Nikoloudis, Damianidis, Bajević, Mousouris, Ikonomopoulos, Stylianopoulos, Kalaitzidis, Domazos, Kotsos, Vladić, Vlachos, Zografos, Chatziioannidis, Argyros, Kaselakis, Thodis, Letsas, Hatziloizou, Kalogeropoulos^{W}, Manolas^{W}
1980–81	R/U	SF	BC: Grp	Papapostolou	Nikolaou, Ravousis (C), Konstantinou, Stergioudas, Ardizoglou, Mavros, Christidis, Bajević, Mousouris, Ikonomopoulos, Stafylas, Vladić, Vlachos, Chatziioannidis, Argyros, Thodis, Alafogiannis^{W}, Kalogeropoulos, Manolas, Paraprastanitis, Tzirakis, Gesios, Eleftherakis, Kottis, Rigas, Papadopoulos, Georgamlis^{W}, Karavitis^{W}
1981–82	4th	16	—	Tilkowski; Čajkovski	Nikolaou (C), Ravousis, Stergioudas, Ardizoglou, Mavros, Christidis, Mousouris, Ikonomopoulos, Stylianopoulos, Stafylas, Vlachos, Thodis, Manolas, Chatziioannidis, Letsas, Paraprastanitis, Tzirakis, Kottis, Rigas, Georgamlis, Karavitis, Bonev, Dintsikos, Ballis, Karagiozopoulos, Radonjić^{W}, Angelidis^{W}
1982–83	3rd	W	UC: R1	Čajkovski; Nestoridis; Senekowitsch	Ravousis, Stergioudas, Ardizoglou, Mavros, Ikonomopoulos, Stylianopoulos, Nikoloudis, Vlachos (C), Thodis, Vlantis, Manolas, Chatziioannidis, Letsas, Paraprastanitis, Tzirakis, Kottis, Georgamlis, Karavitis, Dintsikos, Ballis, Karagiozopoulos, Radonjić, Angelidis, Arvanitis, Kofinas, Tatidis, Kolev
1983–84	7th	16	CWC: R1	Barnwell; Senekowitsch; Nestoridis	Ravousis (C), Stergioudas, Ardizoglou, Mavros, Ikonomopoulos, Stylianopoulos, Nikoloudis, Vlachos, Thodis, Manolas, Chatziioannidis, Letsas, Paraprastanitis, Tzirakis, Kottis, Georgamlis, Dintsikos, Ballis, Karagiozopoulos, Arvanitis, Tatidis, Kolev, Papaioannou, Akrivopoulos, Ross, Langley, Christopoulos^{W}
1984–85	3rd	R1	—	Halama; Georgiadis	Stergioudas, Ardizoglou (C), Mavros, Ikonomopoulos, Stylianopoulos, Vlachos, Manolas, Letsas, Paraprastanitis, Kottis, Georgamlis, Dintsikos, Ballis, Karagiozopoulos, Arvanitis, Papaioannou, Akrivopoulos, Štambachr, Papadopoulos, Chatzis, Pias, Sandberg, Voitsidis, Tsimiliotis, Pytharoulis, Esterházy^{W}
1985–86	3rd	SF	UC: R1	Gmoch	Mavros (C), Ikonomopoulos, Stylianopoulos, Vlachos, Manolas, Georgamlis, Dintsikos, Ballis, Karagiozopoulos, Arvanitis, Papaioannou, Akrivopoulos, Papadopoulos, Chatzis, Pias, Sandberg, Voitsidis, Pytharoulis, Esterházy, Armodoros, Christodoulou, Chatzopoulos, Stafylidis, Porfyris, Patikas^{W}, Dimitriou^{W}
1986–87	7th	AR	UC: R1	Fafié; Alefantos; Christidis	Mavros (C), Ikonomopoulos, Stylianopoulos, Manolas, Dintsikos, Ballis, Karagiozopoulos, Papaioannou, Akrivopoulos, Papadopoulos, Chatzis, Pias, Sandberg, Voitsidis, Esterházy, Armodoros, Christodoulou, Chatzopoulos, Stafylidis, Porfyris, Patikas, Dimitriou, Vasilopoulos, Mavrodimos, Georgiadis, Georgopoulos, Volonakis, Savvidis, Sideris, Markou, Vafiadis, Kotzabasakis, Anagnostopoulos, D. Dimitriadis, G. Dimitriadis, Marangos, Tzogias, Giannitsis, Zarotiadis, Pittas^{W}, Peppes^{W}, Janjanin^{W}
1987–88	R/U	16	—	Veselinović	Ikonomopoulos, Stylianopoulos, Manolas (C), Dintsikos, Karagiozopoulos, Papaioannou, Papadopoulos, Chatzis, Pias, Christodoulou, Chatzopoulos, Patikas, Kofinas, Vasilopoulos, Mavrodimos, Georgiadis, Volonakis, Pittas, Peppes, Janjanin, Koutoulas, Nielsen, Vasilakos, Savvidis
1988–89	W	32	UC: R1	Bajević	Ikonomopoulos Manolas, Dintsikos, Karagiozopoulos, Papaioannou, Chatzis, Chatzopoulos, Christodoulou, Patikas, Kofinas, Vasilopoulos, Mavrodimos, Georgiadis, Volonakis, Pittas, Peppes, Zarotiadis, Koutoulas, Nielsen, Savvidis (C), Karousis, Manginas, Papakostoulis, Okoński, Famelis, Minou, Ioannou, Klopas^{W}, Batalis^{W}, Savevski^{W}, Stamatis^{W}
1989–90	R/U	32	EC: R2; SC: W LC: W	Bajević	Ikonomopoulos, Manolas, Karagiozopoulos, Papaioannou (C), Chatzis, Christodoulou, Patikas, Kofinas, Vasilopoulos, Georgiadis, Peppes, Koutoulas, Savvidis, Papakostoulis, Okoński, Famelis, Minou, Klopas, Batalis, Savevski, Stamatis, Batista, Pangratis, Goumas
1990–91	3rd	16	—	Bajević	Ikonomopoulos, Manolas, Karagiozopoulos (C), Papaioannou, Chatzis, Christodoulou, Patikas, Kofinas, Vasilopoulos, Georgiadis, Peppes, Koutoulas, Savvidis, Papakostoulis, Okoński, Famelis, Minou, Klopas, Savevski, Stamatis, Batista, Pangratis, Goumas, Karagiannis, Pourikas, Milopoulos
1991–92	W	SF	UC: R3	Bajević	Ikonomopoulos, Manolas, Karagiozopoulos, Papaioannou, Chatzis, Patikas, Kofinas, Vasilopoulos, Georgiadis, Peppes, Koutoulas, Savvidis (C), Minou, Klopas, Savevski, Stamatis, Batista, Goumas, Karagiannis, Dimitriadis, Šabanadžović, Theodoridis, Alexandris, Kakousios, Ladogiannis
1992–93	W	SF	UCL: R2; SC: R/U	Bajević	Ikonomopoulos, Manolas, Karagiozopoulos, Papaioannou, Patikas, Vasilopoulos (C), Georgiadis, Koutoulas, Minou, Klopas, Savevski, Stamatis, Karagiannis, Dimitriadis, Šabanadžović, Theodoridis, Alexandris, Kakousios, Ladogiannis, Atmatsidis, Agorogiannis, Papadopoulos, Mitropoulos, Slišković, Drakopoulos^{W}, Kopitsis^{W}, Tsiartas^{W}
1993–94	W	R/U	UCL: R1; SC: R/U	Bajević	Ikonomopoulos, Manolas, Koutoulas, Klopas, Savevski, Stamatis, Vaios Karagiannis, Dimitriadis (C), Šabanadžović, Alexandris, Atmatsidis, Agorogiannis, Papadopoulos, Mitropoulos, Slišković, Drakopoulos, Kopitsis, Tsiartas, Vas. Karagiannis, Borbokis, Kasapis, Vlachos, Theodoropoulos, Konstantinidis
1994–95	5th	R/U	UCL: Grp; SC: R/U	Bajević	Ikonomopoulos, Manolas (C), Koutoulas, Klopas, Savevski, Stamatis, Vaios Karagiannis, Dimitriadis, Šabanadžović, Atmatsidis, Agorogiannis, Papadopoulos, Drakopoulos, Kopitsis, Tsiartas, Vas. Karagiannis, Borbokis, Kasapis, Vlachos, Kostenoglou, Kostis, Ketsbaia, Saravakos, Mirtsekis, Ananiadis, Angelis, Konstantelos, Chalaris, Karalagas
1995–96	R/U	W	CWC: R2	Bajević	Ikonomopoulos, Manolas (C), Koutoulas, Savevski, Stamatis, Vaios Karagiannis, Dimitriadis, Šabanadžović, Batista, Atmatsidis, Agorogiannis, Kopitsis, Tsiartas, Vas. Karagiannis, Borbokis, Kasapis, Vlachos, Theodoridis, Kostenoglou, Kostis, Ketsbaia, Saravakos, Maladenis, Pavlopoulos, Chiotis^{W}
1996–97	R/U	W	CWC: QF; SC: W	Ravousis	Manolas, Koutoulas, Savevski, Vaios Karagiannis, Dimitriadis, Atmatsidis, Batista, Kopitsis, Vas. Karagiannis, Borbokis, Kasapis (C), Vlachos, Kostenoglou, Kostis, Ketsbaia, Maladenis, Pavlopoulos, Chiotis, Nikolaidis, Macheridis, Marcelo, Doboș, Platakis, Kartalis
1997–98	3rd	32	CWC: QF	Dumitriu; Minou	Manolas (C), Koutoulas, Savevski, Vaios Karagiannis, Batista, Atmatsidis, Kopitsis, Vas. Karagiannis, Kasapis, Vlachos, Kostenoglou, Kostis, Maladenis, Pavlopoulos, Chiotis, Nikolaidis, Macheridis, Marcelo, Doboș, Platakis, Michailidis, Grétarsson, Kalitzakis, Kefalas, Katsavos, Passios, Tomić, Alexis, Donis^{W}, Sebwe^{W}
1998–99	R/U	R1	UC: R1	Stepanović; Karagiozopoulos; Blokhin	Savevski, Vaios Karagiannis, Batista, Atmatsidis, Kopitsis, Vas. Karagiannis, Kasapis, Kostenoglou, Maladenis, Chiotis, Nikolaidis (C), Platakis, Michailidis, Grétarsson, Kalitzakis, Sebwe, Kefalas, Katsavos, Passios, Donis, Lakis, Zikos, Markos, Anastasakos, Babunski, Zouboulis, Iliev, Kapsis^{W}, Wreh^{W}, Mendez^{W}, Ceccoli^{W}, Milovanović^{W}, Daditsos^{W}
1999–2000	3rd	W	UCL: QR3; UC: R3	Tumbaković; Karagiozopoulos; Pathiakakis	Savevski, Vaios Karagiannis, Atmatsidis (C), Kopitsis, Kasapis, Kostenoglou, Maladenis, Nikolaidis, Platakis, Michailidis, Grétarsson, Kalitzakis, Katsavos, Passios, Lakis, Kapsis, Zikos, Markos, Anastasakos, Konstantinidis, Dellas, Ćirić, Bjeković, Petrić, Kavazis, Petkaris, Matijašević, Dal Moro, Petkov^{W}, Cantero^{W}, Paraskevaidis^{W}, Belotti^{W}
2000–01	3rd	16	UC: R4	Pathiakakis; Savevski	Savevski, Karagiannis, Atmatsidis (C), Kopitsis, Kasapis, Kostenoglou, Maladenis, Chiotis, Kostis, Nikolaidis, Tsiartas, Michailidis, Passios, Lakis, Kapsis, Zikos, Konstantinidis, Petkov, Dellas, Paraskevaidis, Zagorakis, Ferrugem, Donchev, Toskas, Karameris, Navas, Calvo, Ruiz, Pitos, Georgeas^{W}, Kola^{W}, Medina^{W}
2001–02	R/U	W	UC: R4	Santos	Karagiannis, Atmatsidis, Kasapis, Kostenoglou, Maladenis, Chiotis, Kostis, Nikolaidis, Tsiartas, Passios, Lakis, Kapsis, Zikos, Konstantinidis, Petkov, Anastasakos, Zagorakis (C), Ferrugem, Toskas, Karameris, Navas, Georgeas, Kola, Kappos, Liberopoulos, Maricá, Gamarra, Mielcarski, Rabésandratana, Trichias, Ivić^{W}, Xenidis^{W}, Folha^{W}
2002–03	3rd	SF	UCL: Grp; UC: R4	Bajević	Atmatsidis, Kasapis, Kostenoglou, Maladenis, Chiotis, Kostis, Nikolaidis, Tsiartas, Passios, Borbokis (C), Michailidis, Lakis, Kapsis, Konstantinidis, Petkov, Zagorakis, Toskas, Karameris, Georgeas, Kappos, Liberopoulos, Ivić, Arabatzis, Katsouranis, Kreek, Nalitzis, Georgatos, Pourtoulidis, Maistrellis, Rusev, Prieto, Centeno, Wright, Solakis^{W}
2003–04	4th	SF	UCL: Grp	Bajević; Bourtzikas; Dumitrescu	Kasapis (C), Kostenoglou, Maladenis, Chiotis, Kostis, Tsiartas, Borbokis, Michailidis, Lakis, Kapsis, Konstantinidis, Petkov, Zagorakis, Toskas, Karameris, Georgeas, Kappos, S. Liberopoulos, Ivić, Arabatzis, Katsouranis, Kreek, Nalitzis, Georgatos, Pourtoulidis, Maistrellis, Rusev, N. Liberopoulos, Moras, Amponsah, Stergiatos, Tsevas, Okkas, Thanos, Popov^{W}, Philipakos^{W}
2004–05	3rd	SF	UC: Grp	Santos	Kostenoglou, Chiotis, Kostis, Michailidis, Konstantinidis, Petkov, Toskas, Georgeas, Kappos, Arabatzis, Katsouranis, Maistrellis, Rusev, Liberopoulos (C), Moras, Amponsah, Stergiatos, Tsevas, Solakis, Tziortziopoulos, Kontis, Soares, Krassas, Bourbos, Alves, Assunção, Kampantais, Christoforidis, Voulgaris, Koutsikos, Tsangarogiannakis, Júlio César^{W}, Ivić^{W}, Kyriakidis^{W}, Malbaša^{W}
2005–06	R/U	R/U	UC: R1	Santos	Chiotis, Lakis, Georgeas, Arabatzis, Katsouranis (C), Dellas, Liberopoulos, Moras, Tziortziopoulos, Kontis, Soares, Krassas, Bourbos, Júlio César, Ivić, Kyriakidis, Malbaša, Alexopoulos, Pliatsikas, Kone, Sorrentino, Cirillo, Sapanis, Komvolidis, Venhlynskyi, Papastathopoulos, Koutromanos, Chanko, Kapetanos^{W}, Emerson^{W}
2006–07	2nd	32	UCL: Grp; UC: 32	Ferrer	Chiotis, Lakis, Georgeas, Zikos, Arabatzis, Dellas (C), Liberopoulos, Moras, Tziortziopoulos, Stergiatos, Júlio César, Ivić, Kyriakidis, Kampantais, Alexopoulos, Pliatsikas, Kone, Sorrentino, Cirillo, Sapanis, Papastathopoulos, Kapetanos, Emerson, Lagos, Manduca, Tőzsér, Hetemaj, Pavlis, Delibašić, Pautasso, Kourkoulas, Paligeorgos, Vallianos, Kaltsas, Lykouris, Udeze, Gentsoglou^{W}, Kafes^{W}
2007–08	3rd^{*}	16	UCL: QR3; UC: 32	Ferrer; Kostenoglou	Georgeas, Zikos, Arabatzis, Dellas (C), Liberopoulos, Júlio César, Bourbos, Alexopoulos, Pliatsikas, Kone, Papastathopoulos, Kapetanos, Lagos, Manduca, Tőzsér, Hetemaj, Pavlis, Kafes, Blanco, Geraldo Alves, Nsaliwa, Macho, Edson Ratinho, Rivaldo, Arruabarrena, Pappas, Azcárate, Manú, Moretto, Tofas, Barboudis, Tachtsidis^{W}, Edinho^{W}, Kallon^{W}
2008–09	3rd^{*}	R/U	UC: QR2	Donis; Bajević	Georgeas, Arabatzis, Alexopoulos, Pliatsikas, Lagos, Manduca, Hetemaj, Pavlis, Kafes, Blanco, Geraldo Alves, Nsaliwa, Macho, Edson Ratinho, Rivaldo, Gentsoglou, Tachtsidis, Edinho, Rikka, Scocco, Saja, Djebbour, Burns, Majstorović, Juanfran, Koutromanos, Basinas, Pelletieri, Kyrgiakos (C), Zorbas, Diouf, N'Siabamfumu^{W}
2009–10	3rd^{*}	32	UEL: Grp	Bajević	Georgeas, Arabatzis, Alexopoulos, Lagos, Manduca, Hetemaj, Pavlis, Kafes (C), Blanco, Geraldo Alves, Nsaliwa, Gentsoglou, Tachtsidis, Rikka, Scocco, Saja, Djebbour, Majstorović, Juanfran, Koutromanos, Moschonas, Guerreiro, Makos, Karabelas, Manolas, Leonardo, Jahić, Araujo, Hersi, Yahaya, Lukač, Németh, Iordache, Arce
2010–11	4th^{*}	W	UEL: Grp	Bajević; Kola; Jiménez	Georgeas, Arabatzis, Dellas, Liberopoulos, Lagos, Kafes (C), Blanco, Gentsoglou, Scocco, Saja, Djebbour, Burns, Guerreiro, Makos, Karabelas, Manolas, Leonardo, Jahić, Araujo, Moschonas, Argyriou, Klonaridis, Nasuti, Dadómo, Éder, Bouba Diop, Intzoglou, Kalamiotis, Tsamourlidis, Froxylias, Patsatzoglou, Nikoltsis^{W}, Abdurahmani^{W}, Míchel^{W}, Baha^{W}, Mateos^{W}, Drpić^{W}
2011–12	3rd^{*}	16	UEL: Grp	Jiménez; Kostenoglou	Georgeas, Arabatzis, Dellas, Liberopoulos, Lagos, Kafes (C), Gentsoglou, Rikka, Burns, Guerreiro, Makos, Karabelas, Manolas, Leonardo, Moschonas, Argyriou, Klonaridis, Froxylias^{W}, Nikoltsis, Fountas, Tsitas, Konstantopoulos, Tsoukalas, Bougaidis, Kontoes, Englezou, Helgason, Beleck, José Carlos, Sialmas, Katsetis, Vargas, Guðjohnsen, Cala
2012–13	15th	32	—	Vlachos; Papadopoulos; Lienen; Dellas	Arabatzis, Lagos, Pavlis, Rikka (C), Guerreiro, Moschonas, Tsamourlidis, Fountas, Tsitas, Konstantopoulos, Bougaidis, Kontoes, Tsoukalas, Yago, Cordero, Katsikokeris, Katidis, Koutroumpis, Stamatis, Furtado, Fetsis, Agyriba, V. Vlachos, Papadimitriou, Nikolias, Arkoudas, Grontis, Tsoupros, Kourellas, Makryonitis, Nikolopoulos, K. Vlachos, Kalogeris, Kotsaridis, Aresti^{W}, Mitropoulos^{W}, Petropoulos^{W}, Tsoumagas^{W}, Anakoglou^{W}, Karalis^{W}, Anastasopoulos^{W}
2013–14	1st (FL 2, 6th Group)	QF	—	Dellas	Georgeas (C), Pavlis, Cirillo, Tsoukalas, Cordero, Grontis, Tsoupros, Kalogeris, Anakoglou, Tsoumagas, Dounis, Argyriou, Hereki, Kezos, Zivanović, Paliaroutas, Tselios, Vidalis, Tsevas, Tzathas, Kazviropoulos, Vlachomitros, Vouras, Karagiolidis, Stathakis, Petavrakis, Duberet, Tzanetopoulos, Rovas, Popović, Katsikas, Platellas, Murga, Brečević, D'Acol, Rama, Thanailakis, Dimgiokas
2014–15	1st (FL, South Group)	QF	—	Dellas	Georgeas (C), Cordero, Grontis, Anakoglou, P. Dounis, Tzathas, Tsevas, Vlachomitros, Vouras, Karagiolidis, Tzanetopoulos, Rovas, Petavrakis, Platellas, Brečević, D'Acol, Sarris, Faye, Mantalos, Anestis, Kolovetsios, Lampropoulos, Bakakis, Barbosa, Aravidis, Svarnas, M. Dounis, Soiledis, Zorić, Johansson^{W}, Chrisantus^{W}
2015–16	3rd^{*}	W	—	Dellas; Poyet; Manolas	Cordero, Grontis, Djebbour, Anakoglou, Dounis, Vlachomitros, Vouras, Tzanetopoulos, Petavrakis, Platellas, Brečević, Faye, Mantalos (C), Anestis, Bakakis, Kolovetsios, Lampropoulos, Barbosa, Aravidis, Svarnas, Soiledis, Johansson, Chrisantus, Galanopoulos, Kyriazis, Simões, Galo, Dídac Vilà, Baroja, Vargas, Arzo, Andreopoulos, Vasilantonopoulos, Buonanotte, Pekhart^{W}, Zuculini^{W}
2016–17	2nd^{*}	R/U	UEL: QR3	Ketsbaia; Morais; Jiménez	Dounis, Vlachomitros, Vouras, Tzanetopoulos, Platellas, Faye, Mantalos (C), Anestis, Kolovetsios, Lampropoulos, Bakakis, Barbosa, Aravidis, Svarnas, Johansson, Tselios, Zorić, Galanopoulos, Simões, Galo, Dídac Vilà, Vargas, Vasilantonopoulos, Pekhart, Papadopoulos, Giannoutsos, Bakasetas, Díaz, Barkas, Chyhrynskyi, Patito, Melikiotis, Lazaros, Manolas, Almeida, Lescott, Ajdarević^{W}, Vranješ^{W}, Araujo^{W}, Vinícius^{W}
2017–18	W	R/U	UCL: QR3; UEL: 32	Jiménez	Dounis, Tzanetopoulos, Kone, Mantalos (C), Anestis, Lampropoulos, Bakakis, Johansson, Klonaridis, Tselios, Galanopoulos, Simões, Galo, Giannoutsos, Bakasetas, Barkas, Chyhrynskyi, Patito, Melikiotis, Lazaros, Almeida, Ajdarević, Vranješ, Araujo, Vinícius, Babis, Antoniou, Giousis, Tsintotas, Giakoumakis, Livaja, Traustason, Lopes, Ćosić, Hult^{W}, Masoud^{W}, Morán^{W}
2018–19	3rd	R/U	UCL: Grp	Ouzounidis; Jiménez	Mantalos (C), Lampropoulos, Bakakis, Klonaridis, Galanopoulos, Simões, Galo, Svarnas, Giannoutsos, Bakasetas, Barkas, Chyhrynskyi, Ajdarević, Babis, Giousis, Tsintotas, Giakoumakis, Livaja, Lopes, Ćosić, Hult, Morán, Ginis, Tsivelekidis, Bousis, Stamoulis, Botos, Sardelis, Albanis, Giannikoglou, Oikonomou, Alef, Boyé, Ponce, Gianniotas, Krstičić^{W}
2019–20	3rd^{*}	R/U	UEL: PO	Cardoso; Kostenoglou; Carrera	Mantalos (C), Bakakis, Klonaridis, Galanopoulos, Simões, Svarnas, Barkas, Chyhrynskyi, Giousis, Tsintotas, Giakoumakis, Livaja, Lopes, Vranješ, Araujo^{W}, Hult, Morán, Vasilantonopoulos, Tsivelekidis, Stamoulis, Botos, Sardelis, Albanis, Oikonomou, Krstičić, Šabanadžović, Athanasiadis, Deletić, Paulinho, Verde, Oliveira, Simão, Geraldes, Macheras^{W}, Christopoulos^{W}, Szymański^{W}, Laci^{W}
2020–21	4th^{*}	SF	UEL: Grp	Carrera; Jiménez	Mantalos (C), Bakakis, Galanopoulos, Simões, Svarnas, Chyhrynskyi, Tsintotas, Livaja, Lopes, Botos, Sardelis, Albanis, Vasilantonopoulos, Krstičić, Šabanadžović, Athanasiadis, Paulinho, Oliveira, Simão, Macheras, Christopoulos, Szymański, Laci, Chatziemmanouil, Theocharis, Mitaj, Enobakhare, Karaklajić, Insúa, Hnid, Ansarifard, Levi García, Radonja, Shakhov, Nedelcearu, Tanković, Danchenko^{W}, Kosidis^{W}
2021–22	5th^{*}	QF	UECL: QR2	Milojević; Giannikis; Ofrydopoulos	Mantalos (C), Bakakis, Galanopoulos, Simões, Svarnas, Tsintotas, Lopes, Albanis, Vranješ, Araujo, Šabanadžović, Christopoulos, Szymański, Laci, Ginis, Chatziemmanouil, Theocharis, Mitaj, Ansarifard, Levi García, Radonja, Shakhov, Tanković, Danchenko, Kosidis, Mitoglou, Stanković, Parras, Tzavellas, Le Tallec, Hajsafi, Michelin, Amrabat, Zuber, Jevtić, Rota, Mohammadi, Moustakopoulos, Kornezos, Roukounakis, Judah García, Fransson^{W}, Krychowiak^{W}
2022–23	W^{*}	W	—	Almeyda	Mantalos, Galanopoulos, Tsintotas, Albanis, Araujo (C), Botos^{W}, Šabanadžović, Christopoulos, Szymański, Ginis, Laci^{W}, Chatziemmanouil, Athanasiadis, Theocharis, Levi García, Radonja, Kosidis, Macheras, Mitoglou, Stanković, Parras, Tzavellas, Hajsafi, Amrabat, Zuber, Rota, Mohammadi, Moustakopoulos, Roukounakis, Judah García, Fransson, Gaćinović, Jønsson, Pineda, Vida, Moukoudi, Eliasson, Van Weert, Sidibé, Skondras, Dajko, Fernandes^{W}, Zini^{W}
2023–24	R/U^{*}	16	UCL: PO; UEL: Grp	Almeyda	Mantalos, Galanopoulos, Araujo (C), Šabanadžović, Szymański, Ginis, Laci, Athanasiadis, Theocharis, Levi García, Radonja, Macheras, Mitoglou, Stanković, Hajsafi, Amrabat, Zuber, Rota, Mohammadi, Roukounakis, Judah García, Ponce, Gaćinović, Jønsson, Pineda, Vida, Moukoudi, Eliasson, Van Weert, Sidibé, Skondras, Fernandes, Zini, Pilios, Chrysopoulos, Pizarro, Callens, Ljubičić^{W}
2024–25	4th^{*}	SF	UECL: QR3	Almeyda	Mantalos, Galanopoulos, Szymański, Theocharis, Levi García, Mitoglou, Stanković, Hajsafi, Amrabat, Zuber, Rota, Judah García, Gaćinović, Jønsson, Pineda, Vida (C), Moukoudi, Eliasson, Fernandes, Pilios, Callens, Ljubičić, Angelopoulos, Kosidis, Giannoulis, Theodoridis, Maroutsis, Fofana, Sosa, Nguemechieu, Kolimatsis, Tsiloulis, Brignoli, Strakosha, Pereyra, Koïta, Odubajo, Lamela, Goumas, Pierrot, Martial
2025–26	W^{*}	QF	UECL: QF	Nikolić	Mantalos (C), Mitoglou, Rota, Gaćinović, Jønsson, Pineda, Vida, Moukoudi, Eliasson, Pilios, Callens, Zini, Ljubičić, Chrysopoulos, Angelopoulos, Kosidis, Kolimatsis, Brignoli, Strakosha, Pereyra, Koïta, Odubajo, Pierrot, Martial, Balamotis, Kutesa, Kaloskamis, Relvas, Penrice, Marin, Karargyris, Jović, Grujić, João Mário, Psyropoulos, Georgiev^{W}, Varga^{W}, Sahabo^{W}
2026–27	TBA^{*}	TBA	UCL: LP; SC: R/U	Nikolić	Mantalos (C), Rota, Gaćinović, Vida, Moukoudi, Pilios, Zini, Fernandes, Brignoli, Strakosha, Koïta, Pierrot, Balamotis, Kutesa, Kaloskamis, Relvas, Penrice, Marin, Karargyris, Jović, João Mário, Georgiev, Varga, SahaboSarakasidis, Zubkov, Alexiou, Kairinen, Christakopoulos, Argyriou, Majer, Vitális, Arriaga, Lykogiannis

- Players sorted according to the time they have spent in the club.
- ^{W}:Arrived during the winter transfer period.
- Players in Italics left during the season.
- ^{*}After play–offs.

== See also ==
- AEK Athens F.C.
- List of AEK Athens F.C. records and statistics
- AEK Athens F.C. in European football
