= 1939 Greek Football Cup final =

1939 Greek Cup final
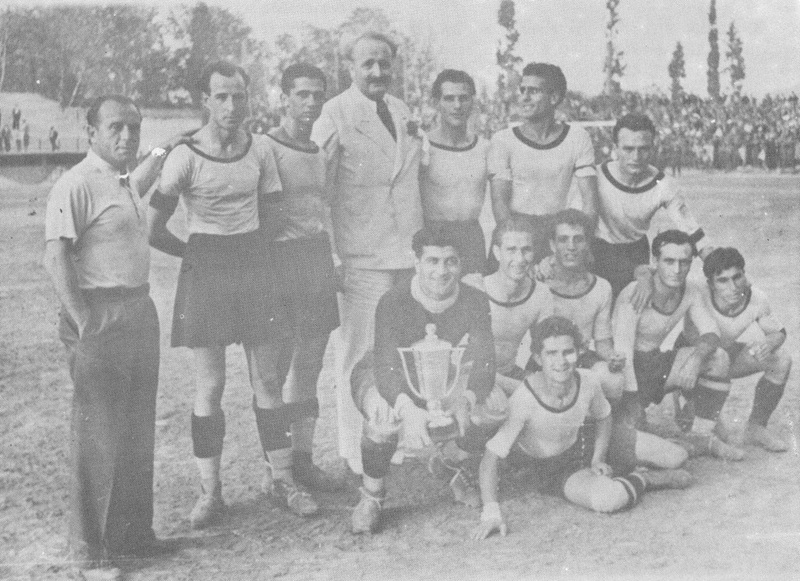
- AEK Athens with the Cup
- Event: 1938–39 Greek Football Cup
AEK Athens	PAOK
2	1
- Date: 28 May 1939
- Venue: Leoforos Alexandras Stadium, Ampelokipoi, Athens
- Referee: Stavros Chatzopoulos

The 1939 Greek Cup final was the 3rd final of the Greek Cup. The match took place on 28 May 1939 at Leoforos Alexandras Stadium. The contesting teams were AEK Athens and PAOK. It was AEK Athens' second Greek Cup final in their 15 years of existence and PAOK's first ever Greek Cup final in their 13-year history. It was the first Cup final to be held after 6 years. With the conquest of the Cup, AEK Athens became the first ever Greek club to achieve the domestic double.

== Venue ==
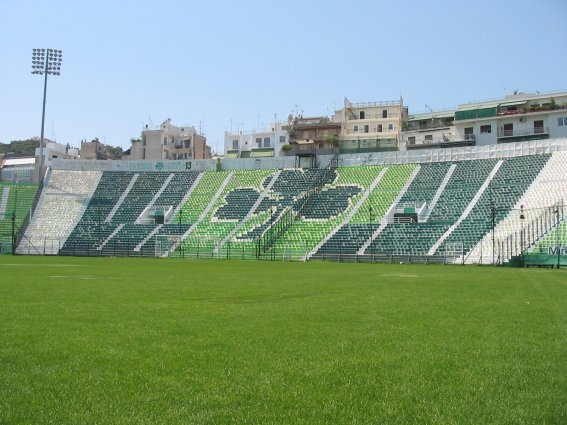
Leoforos Alexandras Stadium.

This was the second Greek Cup final held at Leoforos Alexandras Stadium, after the 1932 final. (Leoforos also hosted the replay match of the 1933 final between Ethnikos Piraeus and Aris).

Leoforos Alexandras Stadium was built in 1922. The stadium is used as a venue for Panathinaikos and Greece. Its current capacity is 30,000.

== Background ==
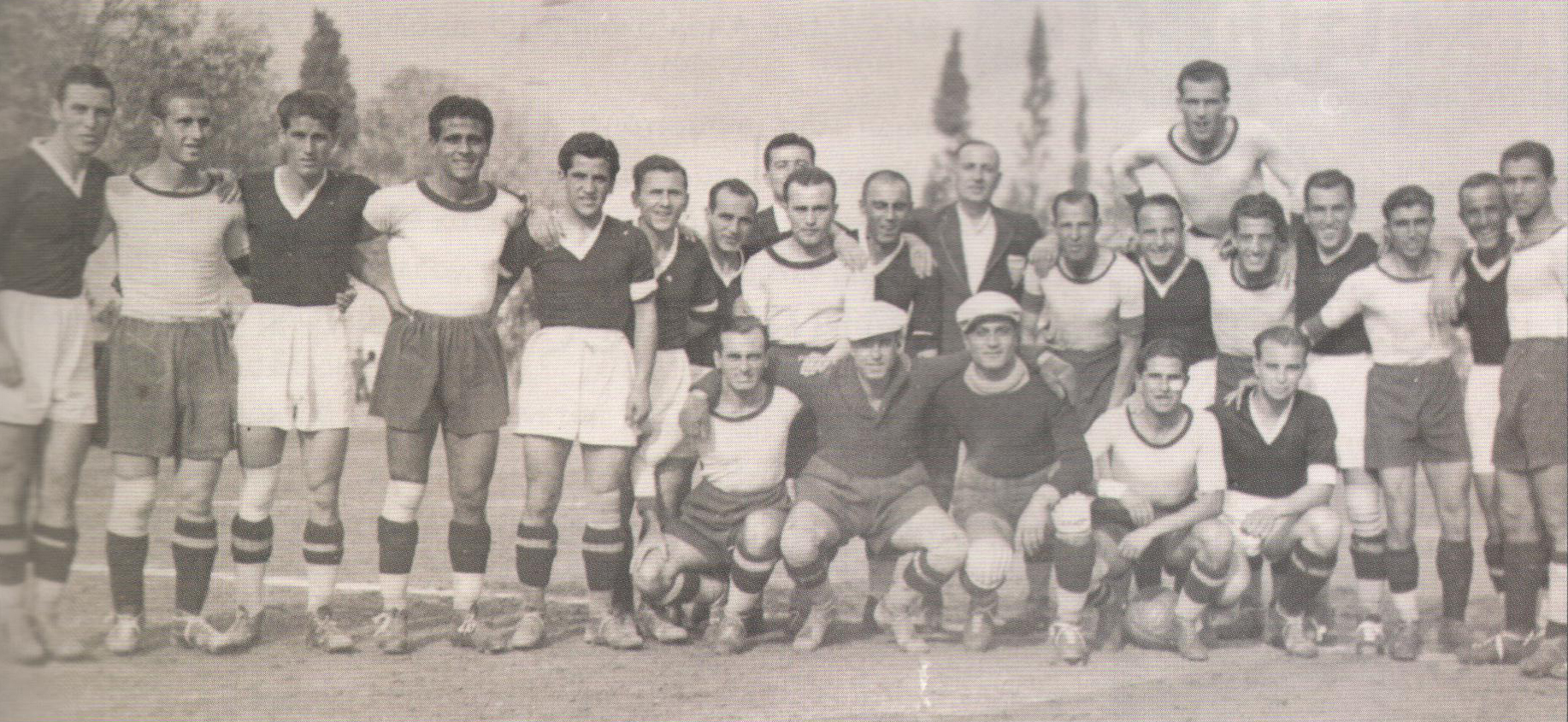
Players of AEK Athens and PAOK before the final

AEK Athens had reached the Greek Cup final once in 1932, where they had won Aris by 5–3.

PAOK had never competed in a Cup final.

The two teams had never met each other in a Cup final.

== Route to the final ==
AEK Athens		Round	PAOK	
Opponent	Result		Opponent	Result
Aris Piraeus	7–0 (H)	Round of 16	Hellas Florina	6–1 (A)
Apollon Athens	3–1 (A)	Quarter-finals	Iraklis	3–2 (H)
Olympiacos	2–0 (w/o) (A)	Semi-finals	Ethnikos Piraeus	4–0 (H)

== Match ==
=== Details ===
28 May 1939
17:00 EET

AEK Athens	2–1	PAOK
Chatzistavridis 41'; Manettas 73'	Report	Ioannidis 33'

Leoforos Alexandras Stadium, Athens
Referee: Stavros Chatzopoulos

AEK Athens	PAOK

GK	(Greece) Christos Ribas (c)
DF	(Greece) Giorgos Gasparis
DF	(Greece) Mimis Seltsikas
MF	(Greece) Dionysis Kapantais
MF	(Greece) Spyros Kontoulis
MF	(Greece) Georgios Magiras
FW	(Cyprus) Kostas Vasiliou
FW	(Greece) Alekos Chatzistavridis
FW	(Greece) Tryfon Tzanetis
FW	(Greece) Kleanthis Maropoulos
FW	(Greece) Vasilios Manettas
Manager:
(Greece) Kostas Negrepontis

GK	(Greece) Nikos Sotiriadis
DF	(Greece) Giorgos Vatikis
DF	(Greece) Youlielmos Arvanitis
MF	(Greece) Apostolos Kontopoulos
MF	(Greece) Kyriakos Bostantzoglou
MF	(Greece) Thrasyvoulos Panidis (c)
FW	(Greece) Glaros
FW	(Greece) Kostas Kritas
FW	(Greece) Aristidis Ioannidis
FW	(Greece) Kostas Kalogiannis
FW	(Greece) Koukoulas
Manager:

Assistant referees:
Kostas Tzitzis (Athens)
Passalaris (Piraeus)

Match rules

- 90 minutes
- 30 minutes of extra time if necessary
- Replay match if scores still level

== See also ==
- 1938–39 Greek Football Cup
