= Georgios Papadopoulos (footballer, born 1914) =

Greek footballer (1914–1976)

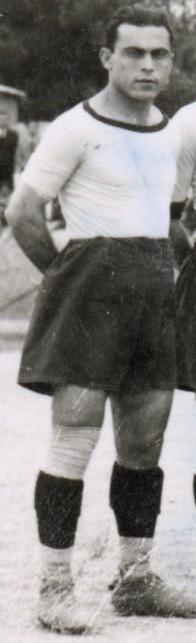
- Papadopoulos in the late 1930s

Personal information
- Date of birth: 1914
- Place of birth: Dardanelles, Ottoman Empire
- Date of death: 20 August 1976 (aged 61–62)
- Place of death: Athens, Greece
- Position: Left-back

Youth career
- –1933: PAOK

Senior career*
Years	Team	Apps	(Gls)
1930–1933	PAOK		
1933–1948	AEK Athens	8	(0)

International career
1934–1940	Greece	9	(0)

Managerial career
- A.O. Ampelokipoi
- A.O. Zografou
- Ilisiakos
- * Club domestic league appearances and goals

Georgios Papadopoulos (Greek: Γεώργιος Παπαδόπουλος; 1914 – 20 August 1976) was a Greek professional footballer who played as a left-back.

== Club career ==
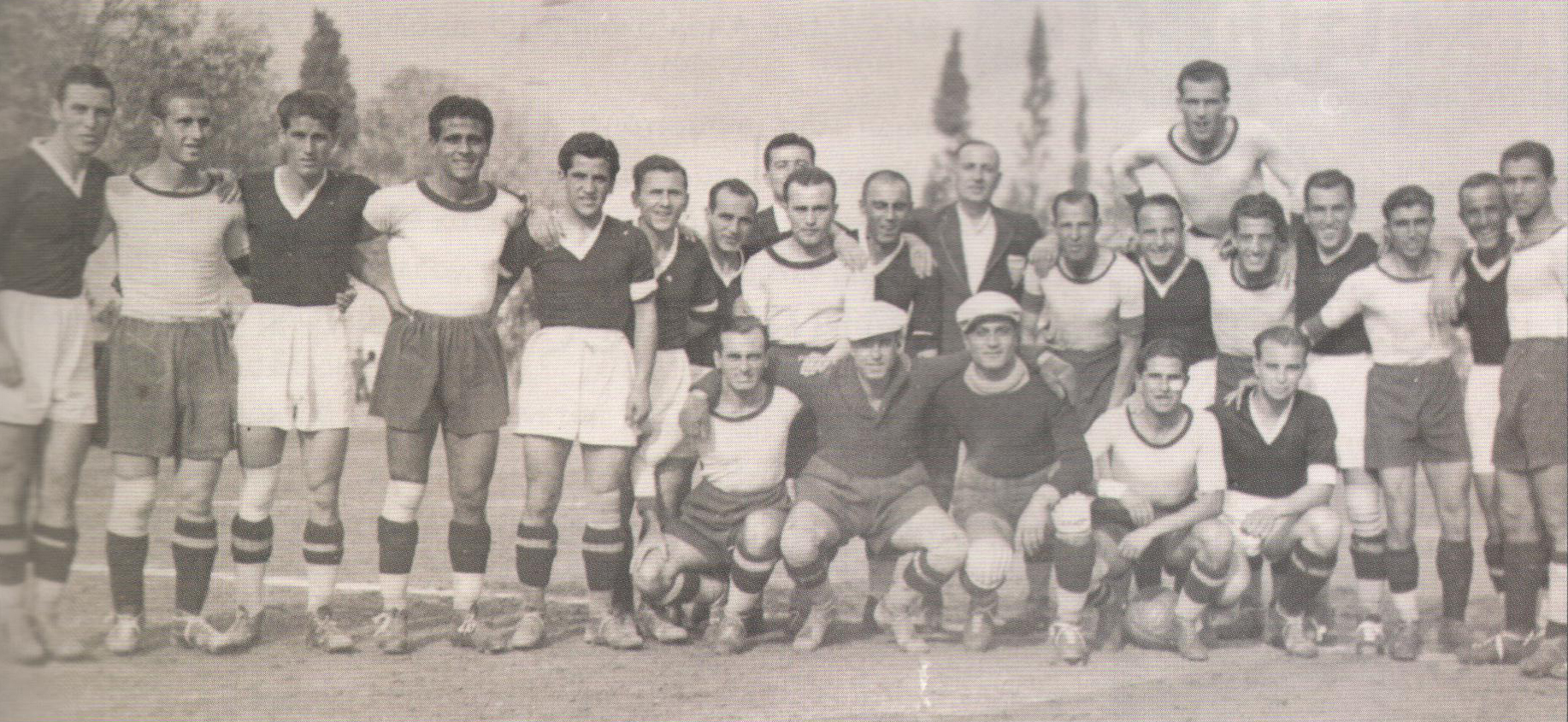
Players of AEK Athens and PAOK before the 1939 Cup final

Papadopoulos enlisted at the academies of PAOK, where his older brother, Charalampos played as goalkeeper. In 1930 he made his debut in the senior team. He played for the club of Thessaloniki for three years when he moved to Athens to sign for AEK Athens.

There he played alongside players, such as Kleanthis Maropoulos, Michalis Delavinias, Christos Ribas, Vasilios Manettas, Tryfon Tzanetis and Georgios Magiras, while he won 2 consecutive Panhellenic Championships, 3 Greek Cups and 4 Athens FCA League, including the first domestic double by a Greek club in 1939. He played at the club until 1948, when he retired from football.

== International career ==
Papadopoulos made a total of 9 appearances for Greece, between 1934 and 1940. His debut took place on 23 December 1934 in a home win against Yugoslavia of the fourth Balkan Cup, under the instructions of Apostolos Nikolaidis. He was also part of Greece's team for their qualification matches for the 1938 FIFA World Cup.

== Managerial career ==
After he retired as a football player Papadopoulos worked as manager at club such as A.O. Ampelokipoi, A.O. Zografou and Ilisiakos.

== Personal life and death ==
Papadopoulos was an employee at the Water Company. He died on 20 August 1976 and was buried at the cemetery of Agia Fotini in Nea Smyrni.

== Honours ==
AEK Athens

- Panhellenic Championship: 1938–39, 1939–40
- Greek Cup: 1938–39
- Athens FCA League: 1940, 1946, 1947
