= 1938 FIFA World Cup qualification Group 6 =

Football tournament qualification stage

The 1938 FIFA World Cup qualification Group 6 took place from January to March 1938. Hungary as the strongest team of this group was seeded. Greece and Mandatory Palestine would play against each other on a home-and-away basis. Hungary would play against the winner at home. The winner would qualify for the third FIFA World Cup held in France.

== Matches ==
=== Mandatory Palestine vs Greece ===
Mandatory Palestine	1 — 3 (final score after 90 minutes)	Greece
Manager: (Austria) Egon Pollak Team: 01 - GK - Julius Klein; 02 - DF - Avraham Beit haLevi; 03 - DF - Avraham Reznik (capt.); 04 - MF - Yosef Libermann; 05 - MF - Yohanan Sukenik; 06 - MF - Menahem Mirmovich; 07 - FW - Mila Ginzburg; 08 - FW - Shuka Brashedski; 09 - FW - Peri Neufeld; 10 - FW - Gaul Machlis; 11 - FW - Avraham Nudelmann Substitutes: none Unused Substitutes: ? Scorers: 1-2 Peri Neufeld (36')	Half-time: 1-2 Competition: World Cup qualifier 1938 (Group 5) Date: Saturday; 22 January 1938 Kick off: 3.30 p.m. Venue: Maccabiah Stadium, Tel Aviv Attendance: 5000 Referee: Mohamed Youssef EGY Assistants: ? Match rules: 90 minutes substitutes ?	Manager: (Greece) Kostas Negrepontis Team: 01 - GK - Spyros Sklavounos; 02 - DF - Giorgos Gasparis; 03 - DF - Georgios Papadopoulos; 04 - MF - Anastasios Kritikos; 05 - MF - Antonis Kasimatis sub 46'; 06 - MF - Konstantinos Gikas; 07 - FW - Antonis Migiakis (capt.); 08 - FW - Dimitris Baltatsis; 09 - FW - Kleanthis Vikelidis; 10 - FW - Kleanthis Maropoulos; 11 - FW - Theologis Symeonidis Substitutes: 12 - MF - Spyros Kontoulis on 46' Unused Substitutes: ? Scorers: 0-1 Kleanthis Vikelidis (15'); 0-2 Kleanthis Vikelidis (30'); 1-3 Antonis Migiakis (73')

=== Greece vs Mandatory Palestine ===
Greece	1 — 0 (final score after 90 minutes)	Mandatory Palestine
Manager: (Greece) Kostas Negrepontis Team: 01 - GK - Spyros Sklavounos sub 15'; 02 - DF - Giorgos Gasparis; 03 - DF - Georgios Papadopoulos; 04 - MF - Anastasios Kritikos; 05 - MF - Spyros Kontoulis; 06 - MF - Konstantinos Gikas; 07 - FW - Antonis Migiakis (capt.); 08 - FW - Spyros Depountis; 09 - FW - Kleanthis Vikelidis; 10 - FW - Kleanthis Maropoulos; 11 - FW - Vasilios Manettas Substitutes: 12 - GK - Nikolaos Sotiriadis on 15' Unused Substitutes: ? Scorers: 1-0 Kleanthis Vikelidis (86', pen.)	Half-time: 0-0 Competition: World Cup qualifier 1938 (Group 5) Date: Sunday; 20 February 1938 Kick off: 3 p.m. Venue: Leoforos Alexandras Stadium, Athens Attendance: 12000 Referee: Mika Popović YUG Assistants: ? Match rules: 90 minutes substitutes ?	Manager: (Austria) Egon Pollak Team: 01 - GK - Israel Elsner; 02 - DF - Avraham Beit haLevi; 03 - DF - Avraham Reznik (capt.); 06 - MF - Yosef Libermann; 05 - MF - Gdalyahu Fuchs; 04 - MF - Menahem Mirmovich; 08 - FW - Yona Stern; 10 - FW - Jerry Beit haLevi; 09 - FW - Peri Neufeld; 07 - FW - Gaul Machlis; 11 - FW - Natan Panz Substitutes: none Unused Substitutes: ? Scorers: -

=== Hungary vs Greece ===
Hungary	11 — 1 (final score after 90 minutes)	Greece
Manager: (Hungary) Károly Dietz Team: 01 - GK - József Háda; 02 - DF - Lajos Korányi; 03 - DF - Sándor Bíró; 04 - MF - Gyula Lázár; 05 - MF - György Szűcs; 06 - MF - István Balogh; 07 - FW - Ferenc Sas; 08 - FW - Jenő Vincze; 09 - FW - József Nemes; 10 - FW - Gyula Zsengellér; 11 - FW - Pál Titkos Substitutes: none Unused Substitutes: ? Scorers: 1-0 Gyula Zsengellér (15'); 2-0 Pál Titkos (18'); 3-0 Gyula Zsengellér (23', pen.); 4-0 Gyula Zsengellér (25'); 5-0 Jenő Vincze (30'); 6-0 József Nemes (37'); 7-0 József Nemes (41'); 8-0 József Nemes (51'); 9-0 Gyula Zsengellér (67'); 10-0 Pál Titkos (82'); 11-0 Gyula Zsengellér (85')	Half-time: 7-0 Competition: World Cup qualifier 1938 (Group 5) Date: Friday; 25 March 1938 Kick off: 3 p.m. Venue: Hungária Stadion, Budapest Attendance: 14000 Referee: Denis Xifando ROM Assistants: ? Match rules: 90 minutes substitutes ?	Manager: (England) Bill Baggett Team: 01 - GK - Spyros Sklavounos; 02 - DF - Nikos Tsaganias; 03 - DF - Georgios Papadopoulos; 04 - MF - Kimonas Deligiannis; 05 - MF - Spyros Kontoulis; 06 - MF - Konstantinos Gikas; 07 - FW - Antonis Migiakis (capt.); 08 - FW - Kleanthis Maropoulos; 09 - FW - Kleanthis Vikelidis; 10 - FW - Lefteris Makris; 11 - FW - Kostas Christodoulou Substitutes: none Unused Substitutes: ? Scorers: 11-1 Lefteris Makris (90')

== Team stats ==
=== Hungary ===
Head coach: (Hungary) Károly Dietz

Pos.	Player	DoB	Games played	Goals	Minutes played	Sub off	Sub on	(Greece)	Club
MF	István Balogh	September 21, 1912	1	0	90	0	0	90	(Hungary) Újpest FC
DF	Sándor Bíró	August 19, 1911	1	0	90	0	0	90	(Hungary) Hungária FC
GK	József Háda	March 2, 1911	1	0	90	0	0	90	(Hungary) Ferencvárosi FC
DF	Lajos Korányi	May 15, 1907	1	0	90	0	0	90	(Hungary) Ferencvárosi FC
MF	Gyula Lázár	January 24, 1911	1	0	90	0	0	90	(Hungary) Ferencvárosi FC
FW	József Nemes	1914	1	3	90	0	0	90	(Hungary) Kispesti FC
FW	Ferenc Sas	1915	1	0	90	0	0	90	(Hungary) Hungária FC
MF	György Szűcs	April 23, 1912	1	0	90	0	0	90	(Hungary) Újpest FC
FW	Pál Titkos	January 8, 1908	1	2	90	0	0	90	(Hungary) Hungária FC
FW	Jenő Vincze	November 20, 1908	1	1	90	0	0	90	(Hungary) Újpest FC
FW	Gyula Zsengellér	December 27, 1915	1	5	90	0	0	90	(Hungary) Újpest FC

=== Greece ===
Head coach: (Greece) Kostas Negrepontis (first and second match); (England) Alan Buckett (third match)

Pos.	Player	DoB	Games played	Goals	Minutes played	Sub off	Sub on	(Mandatory Palestine)	(Mandatory Palestine)	(Hungary)	Club
FW	Dimitris Baltatsis		1	0	90	0	0	90	-	-	(Greece) Panathinaikos
FW	Kostas Christodoulou		1	0	90	0	0	-	-	90	(Greece) Panathinaikos
MF	Kimonas Deligiannis		1	0	90	0	0	-	-	90	(Greece) Apollon Smyrnis
FW	Spyros Depountis		1	0	90	0	0	-	90	-	(Greece) Olympiacos
DF	Giorgos Gasparis		2	0	180	0	0	90	90	-	(Greece) AEK Athens
MF	Kostas Gikas		3	0	270	0	0	90	90	90	(Greece) Apollon Smyrnis
MF	Antonis Kasimatis		1	0	45	1	0	45	-	-	(Greece) Olympiacos
MF	Spyros Kontoulis		3	0	225	0	1	45	90	90	(Greece) AEK Athens
MF	Anastasios Kritikos		2	0	180	0	0	90	90	-	(Greece) Panathinaikos
FW	Lefteris Makris		1	1	90	0	0	-	-	90	(Greece) Asteras Zografou
FW	Vasilis Manetas		1	0	90	0	0	-	90	-	(Greece) AEK Athens
FW	Kleanthis Maropoulos	1919	3	0	270	0	0	90	90	90	(Greece) AEK Athens
FW	Antonis Migiakis	1911	3	2	270	0	0	90	90	90	(Greece) Panathinaikos
DF	Georgios Papadopoulos		3	0	270	0	0	90	90	90	(Greece) AEK Athens
GK	Spyros Sklavounos	1912	3	0	195	1	0	90	15	90	(Greece) Panathinaikos
GK	Nikos Sotiriadis		1	0	75	0	1	-	75	-	(Greece) PAOK
FW	Theologis Symeonidis		1	0	90	0	0	90	-	-	(Greece) Olympiacos
DF	Nikos Tsaganias		1	0	90	0	0	-	-	90	(Greece) Iraklis
FW	Kleanthis Vikelidis	1916	3	3	270	0	0	90	90	90	(Greece) Aris

=== Mandatory Palestine ===
Head coach: (Austria) Egon Pollak

Pos.	Player	DoB	Games played	Goals	Minutes played	Sub off	Sub on	(Greece)	(Greece)	Club
DF	Avraham Beit haLevi	1915	2	0	180	0	0	90	90	(Mandatory Palestine) Hapoel Tel Aviv
FW	Jerry Beit haLevi	November 14, 1912	1	0	90	0	0	-	90	(Mandatory Palestine) Maccabi Tel Aviv
FW	Shuka Brashedski	1914	1	0	90	0	0	90	-	(Mandatory Palestine) Hapoel Haifa
GK	Israel Elsner	1909	1	0	90	0	0	-	90	(Mandatory Palestine) Maccabi Tel Aviv
MF	Gdalyahu Fuchs	1911	1	0	90	0	0	-	90	(Mandatory Palestine) Hapoel Haifa
FW	Mila Ginzburg	1918	1	0	90	0	0	90	-	(Mandatory Palestine) Maccabi Tel Aviv
GK	Julius Klein	1907	1	0	90	0	0	90	-	(Mandatory Palestine) Hapoel Haifa
MF	Yosef Libermann	1909	2	0	180	0	0	90	90	(Mandatory Palestine) Maccabi Tel Aviv
FW	Gaul Machlis	1918	2	0	180	0	0	90	90	(Mandatory Palestine) Maccabi Tel Aviv
MF	Menahem Mirmovich	1919	2	0	180	0	0	90	90	(Mandatory Palestine) Maccabi Tel Aviv
FW	Peri Neufeld	1913	2	1	180	0	0	90	90	(Mandatory Palestine) Maccabi Tel Aviv
FW	Avraham Nudelmann	1910	1	0	90	0	0	90	-	(Mandatory Palestine) Hapoel Tel Aviv
FW	Natan Pentz	1917	1	0	90	0	0	-	90	(Mandatory Palestine) Maccabi Tel Aviv
DF	Avraham Reznik	1909	2	0	180	0	0	90	90	(Mandatory Palestine) Maccabi Tel Aviv
FW	Yona Stern	1908	1	0	90	0	0	-	90	(Mandatory Palestine) Hapoel Haifa
MF	Yohanan Sukenik	1910	1	0	90	0	0	90	-	(Mandatory Palestine) Hapoel Tel Aviv
