= Mimis Seltsikas =

Greek footballer (1916–1938)

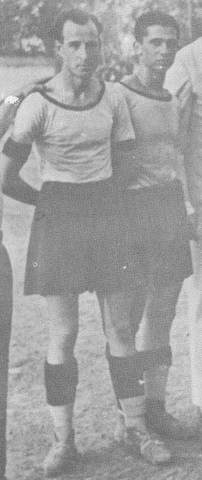
- Seltsikas (left) with Tryfon Tzanetis in 1939

Personal information
- Full name: Dimitrios Seltsikas
- Date of birth: 1910
- Place of birth: Athens, Greece
- Position: Defender

Senior career*
| Years | Team | Apps | (Gls) |
| 1935–1946 | AEK Athens | | |

Managerial career
- 1946–1950: Egaleo
- 1950–1951: Atromitos
- 1951: Panamvrakikos
- * Club domestic league appearances and goals

Mimis Seltsikas (Greek: Μίμης Σέλτσικας; 1910 – ?) was a Greek footballer who played as a defender and a later manager.

== Club career ==
In 1935 Seltsikas signed for AEK Athens. He was a member of the team that in 1939, coached by Kostas Negrepontis, won the first domestic double in Greece. The following season AEK Athens won a second consecutive championship, but as the previous season, he didn't make any appearance in the finals. He stayed at the club throughout the events of the Occupation, where Greek football was mostly inactive and he eventually left in 1946. During his spell at AEK, he won two consecutive Panhellenic Championships, one Cup and three Athens FCA Championships.

== Managerial career ==
After the retiring as a footballer, Seltsikas became involved in coaching, taking over Egaleo, which he promoted two divisions in 4 years, from the 3rd Division of Athens in 1948 to the A2 Division of Athens in 1950. In 1951, he repeated his achievement as coach of Atromitos. Subsequently, he took over the management of Panamvrakikos.

== Honours ==
=== Player ===
AEK Athens

- Panhellenic Championship: 1938–39, 1939–40
- Greek Cup: 1938–39
- Athens FCA League: 1940, 1946, 1947

=== Manager ===
Egaleo

- Athens FCA League 3rd division: 1948
- Athens FCA League 2nd division: 1950

Atromitos

- Athens FCA League 2nd division: 1951
