= Michalis Delavinias =

Greek footballer

- Michalis Delavinias

Personal information
- Full name: Michail Delavinias
- Date of birth: 1921
- Place of birth: Athens, Greece
- Date of death: 6 November 2003 (aged 81–82)
- Place of death: Athens, Greece
- Position: Goalkeeper

Youth career
- 1933: Enosis Agios Eleftherios
- 1934–1938: AEK Athens

Senior career*
Years	Team	Apps	(Gls)
1938−1954	AEK Athens	14	(0)

International career
1948–1951	Greece	4	(0)
1952	Greece Olympic	0	(0)
- * Club domestic league appearances and goals

Michalis Delavinias (Greek: Μιχάλης Δελαβίνιας; 1921 – 6 November 2003) was a Greek footballer who played as a goalkeeper for AEK Athens. He was known by the nickname "Black cat" (Greek: "Μαύρος γάτος"), due to the fact that he usually played in a black kit.

== Club career ==
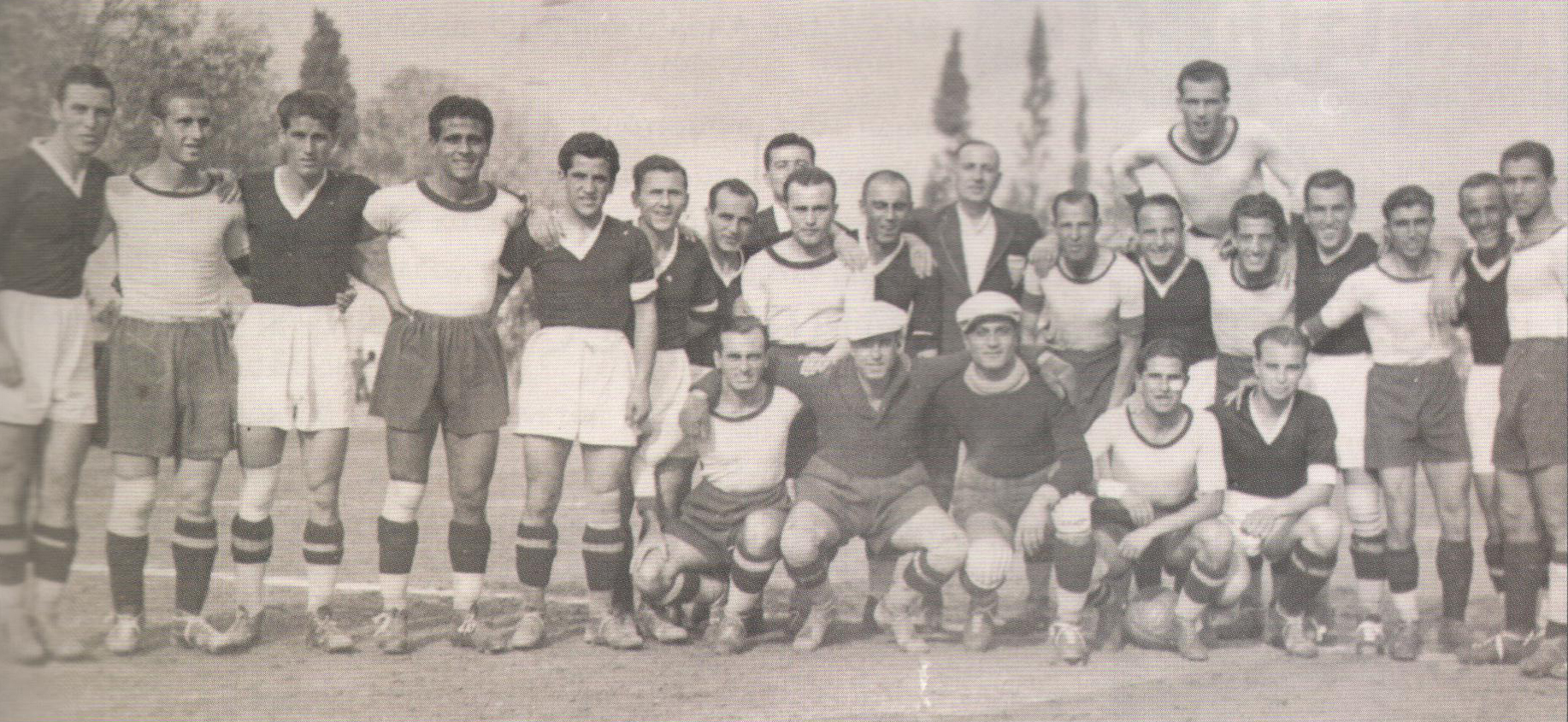
Players of AEK Athens and PAOK before the 1939 Cup final

Delavinias started playing football in 1933, playing for the independent club of Athens, the Enosi Agios Eleftherios. In 1934 he joined the infrastructure departments of AEK Athens' academy and in 1938 under the manager Kostas Negrepontis he was promoted to the senior team, essentially replacing Christos Ribas in a 3–1 against Apollon Athens. He remained at AEK Athens until 1954, when he stopped playing football at the age of 33. With AEK he won two Panhellenic Championships, three Cups and four Athens FCA Leagues including the first ever domestic double in 1939. He also played with the Athens XI.

== International career ==
Delavinias played in four matches for Greece from 1948 to 1951.

He was also part of Greece's squad for the 1952 Summer Olympics, but he did not play in any matches.

== Personal life ==
Delavinias was married and had a child named Elenitsa.

== Honours ==
AEK Athens

- Panhellenic Championship: 1938–39, 1939–40
- Greek Cup: 1938–39, 1948–49, 1949–50
- Athens FCA League: 1940, 1946, 1947, 1950

== See also ==
- List of one-club men in association football
