= Kostas Christodoulou =

Greek footballer (born 1915)

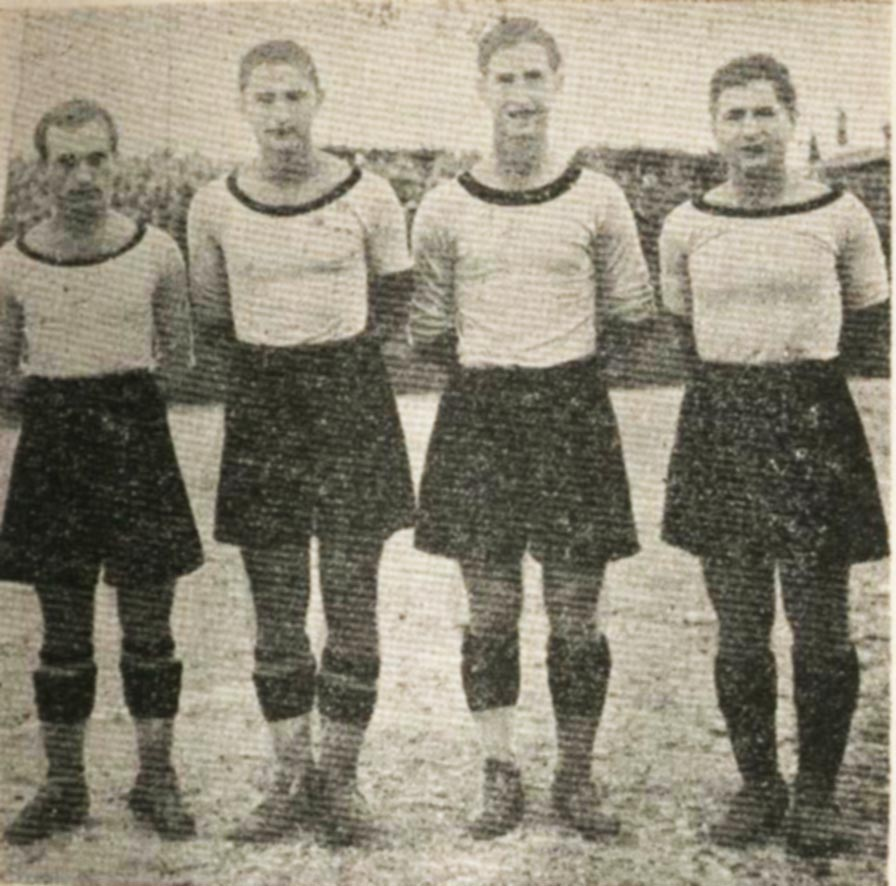
- Christodoulou (right) with Maropoulos, Tzanetis and Chatzistavridis. (left)

Personal information
- Full name: Konstantinos Christodoulou
- Date of birth: 1915
- Place of birth: Athens, Greece
- Position: Forward

Youth career
- –1930: PAO Daphni Athens

Senior career*
Years	Team	Apps	(Gls)
1930–1936	Panathinaikos		
1936–1945	AEK Athens	3	(1)

International career
1934–1938	Greece	5	(0)
- * Club domestic league appearances and goals

Kostas Christodoulou (Greek: Κώστας Χριστοδούλου; born 1915) was a Greek footballer who played as a forward and a later manager.

== Club career ==
Christodoulou started the football at PAO Dafni Athens where he competed at the left wing of the offense. In the summer of 1930 and at a very young age, he moved to Panathinaikos without the consent of his club, a very common event at the time and was punished with a one year ban from every official competition, according to the regulations at the time. With the "greens" he won the Athens FCA league in 1934.

In 1936 he joined the city rivals, AEK Athens, where he played for 9 years winning 2 consecutive Panhellenic Championships, 1 Cup and 2 Athens FCA Championships, including the first domestic double in by a Greek club in 1939. He stopped football in 1945, during the events of the World War II and the Occupation, where the Greek football was inactive, at the age of 30.

== International career ==
Christodoulou played for Greece, where he made his debut on 4 February 1934 in the 1–0 friendly win against Bulgaria at Leoforos Alexandras Stadium, where he replaced Leonidas Andrianopoulos in the 55th minute. He was limited to 5 international appearances, four with Panathinaikos and one with AEK, due to World War II, as he took part in Greece's last pre-war meeting on 25 March 1938, where they achieved their greatest defeat by 11–1 against Hungary in Budapest.

== Managerial career ==
After retiring as a football player, Christodoulou coached various teams such as Proodeftiki among others.

== Personal life ==
His younger brother, Christos was also a footballer, also on the left wing of the midfield of Panathinaikos.

== Honours ==
Panathninaikos

- Athens FCA League: 1934

AEK Athens

- Panhellenic Championship: 1938–39, 1939–40
- Greek Cup: 1938–39
- Athens FCA League: 1940, 1946
