= Kostas Negrepontis =

Greek footballer and manager (1897–1973)

- Kostas Negrepontis playing for AEK Athens.

Personal information
- Full name: Konstantinos Negrepontis
- Date of birth: 31 October 1897
- Place of birth: Constantinople, Ottoman Empire
- Date of death: 19 February 1973 (aged 75)
- Place of death: Patisia, Athens, Greece
- Positions: Striker; inside right; outside right

Youth career
- 1912–1916: Enosis Tatavla

Senior career*
Years	Team	Apps	(Gls)
1916–1917	Pera Club		
1917–1918	Fenerbahçe		
1918–1923	Pera Club		
1923–1925	CASG Paris		
1925–1926	SC Douai		
1926–1933	AEK Athens	6	(2)

International career
1929–1930	Greece	2	(0)

Managerial career
- 1929–1932: AEK Patras
- 1933–1934: Greece
- 1933–1936: AEK Athens
- 1937: Ethnikos Piraeus
- 1937–1948: AEK Athens
- 1938: Greece
- 1948–1950: Greece
- 1948–1949: Fostiras
- 1950–1954: Panionios
- 1952–1953: Greece military
- 1953: Greece
- 1953–1954: Greece U19
- 1955: Olympiacos
- 1955–1957: AEK Athens
- 1957–1958: Panegialios
- 1958–1959: AEK Athens
- 1959: Atromitos
- 1960–1961: Panachaiki
- * Club domestic league appearances and goals

Kostas Negrepontis (Greek: Κώστας Νεγρεπόντης; 31 October 1897 – 19 February 1973) was a Greek footballer who played as a forward in the 1920s and 1930s and a later manager. He was regarded as a technically skilled forward noted for his football intelligence and shooting ability. Negrepontis was widely respected by both supporters and opponents and remained a respected figure within Greek football. Contemporary accounts frequently referred with admiration about "Negro", as was his nickname. Negrepontis played an important role in the early development of Greek football. He contributed both as a footballer and later as a manager, while he served as an instructor for prospective managers. He was distinguished for his passion and dedication to the development of Greek football, especially through his long association with AEK Athens.

== Club career ==
=== Early years ===
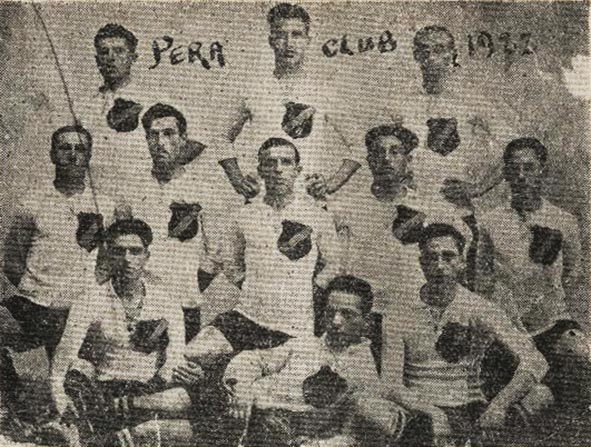
Players of Pera Club. Negrepontis is on the left.

Negrepontis started his football career in 1912 at Enosis Tatavla in Turkey, where he played for four years.

In 1916 he moved to the football department of Pera Club, which were also known as the "Greek football team". In 1918 he became the team's captain. He also had a brief spell at Fenerbahçe in the period 1917–18.

Negrepontis was a prominent sporting figure among the Greek youth of the region. Young supporters sought to imitate his moves and whenever Pera Club played, they rushed to the stadium to admire him. With Pera Club he won a Turkish Championship in 1922. After the Greco-Turkish War in 1922, Negrepontis, as the team's captain, took the initiative to take Pera Club on a tour in Europe, with Greece being one of their stops. Throughout the tour they played 47 matches and achieved 43 wins, 2 draws and 2 defeats, while both the team and Negrepontis were admired by European fans for their achievements.

After Pera Club was dissolved in 1923, he moved to CASG Paris, where in 1925 he became their captain. In 1925 he joined Sporting Douai, where he also served as their captain.

=== AEK Athens ===
In 1926 Negrepontis returned to Greece and joined AEK Athens. On 8 November 1931 he led AEK to the conquest of the first Greek Cup, which was also the first trophy in the club's history, defeating Aris by 5–3, with Negrepontis scoring the last goal. In the same year, AEK won the Acropolis Cup, after a 4–2 win over the Austrian Admira Wacker, that had previously defeated both Olympiacos and Panathinaikos throughout the tournament. In 1933 Negrepontis retired as a footballer, at the age of 36.

== International career ==
In June 1929, Negrepontis became a member of Greece. He made his debut against Bulgaria in a friendly match that ended 1–1 coming off the bench at the 46th minute. That was the second match in the history of Greece and their first match without defeat. His second and last game was in March 1930 in a friendly match against Italy B in a 3–0 defeat. Since the establishment of the HFF occurred at the dawn of his career, he did not make any more appearances for Greece.

== Managerial career ==
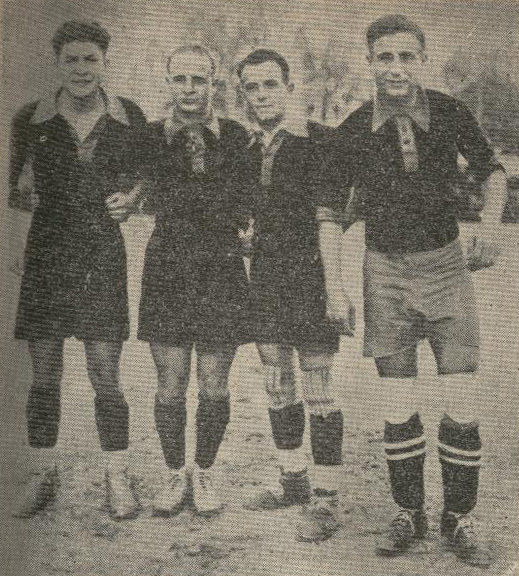
Iliaskos, Dimopoulos, Negrepontis, and Emmanouilidis.

Even before the end of his football career Negrepontis was also involved in coaching. He became the first manager in the history of AEK Patras, from their foundation in 1929, until their promotion to the Achaea first division in 1931.

In 1933, AEK Athens were preparing for a qualifying match against Goudi. Their manager at the time was Emil Rauchmaul and Negrepontis was on holiday at Samos. The importance of the occasion was such that led him to prepare AEK for this crucial match and thus he became the first Greek manager of a major club, at a time when mostly foreign managers were hired. AEK became his first professional club to work as a manager and his involvement with the club lasted for 16 years in total. In his first spell at AEK, Negrepontis won two Panhellenic championships and a Greek Cup, including the first domestic double by a Greek club in 1939. Additionally, several notable players emerged at AEK, such as Maropoulos, Tzanetis, Goulios, Delavinias, Kontoulis, Magiras, Manettas and Xenos.

After leaving AEK in 1948, he joined Fostiras, while in September 1949 he took charge as the technical director of Olympiacos. In September 1950 he became the manager of Panionios. Negrepontis also worked as the manager of Greece in four different periods between 1933 and 1953. On 25 November 1949 under his guidance Greece achieved the largest victory of their history after a 8–0 win against Syria at Leoforos Alexandras Stadium. He also worked as the manager of the Greek military team where he won the World Military Cup in 1952.

In 1955 after a brief spell at Olympiacos, Negrepontis returned to AEK, where he won the Greek Cup in 1956. In February 1957 Negrepontis left AEK, but returned at their bench in 1958. In 1959 he took charge of Atromitos. He also managed teams of the likes of Panelefsiniakos, Apollon Athens, Ethnikos Piraeus, Panegialios and Panachaiki.

== Personal life ==
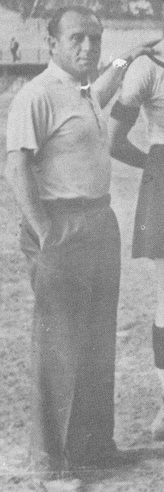
Kostas Negrepontis in 1939

In 1965 Negrepontis retired from football, but remained closely connected to AEK, even when he fell ill. In recognition of his contribution to Greek football, he was honored by King Paul and by the Association of Sports Editors.

== Death ==
On 19 February 1973 at 11:00 p.m., Negrepontis died after a 2-year struggle with illness.

The former president of AEK Athens and author of the first history book about the club, Panos Makridis wrote in the Greek newspaper, "Athletic Echo" about the death of Negrepontis:

"As a former president, but also as one of the founders of AEK, together with the whole supporters, I mourn the loss of Kostas Negrepontis. He was one of the creators of the glory of AEK, but also a brave and honest fighter in the stadiums, whether Greek or foreign. With the death of Kostas Negrepontis, perhaps the last of the old honest football fighters is lost, who fought exlusively for the idea and the honor and the colors of Greece as international footballers, but also of the club they served. Kostas Negrepontis was epoch-making and as a moral footballer without wages and "bonuses". He was the creator of a football school, the manager of the national team and the military team."

== Honours ==
=== As a player ===
Pera Club

- Turkish Championship: 1922

AEK Athens

- Greek Cup: 1931–32

=== As a manager ===
AEK Athens

- Panhellenic Championship: 1938–39, 1939–40
- Greek Cup: 1938–39, 1955–56
- Athens FCA Championship: 1940, 1946, 1947

Panionios

- Athens FCA Championship: 1951

Greece military

- World Military Cup: 1952
