= Spyros Sklavounos =

Greek footballer

Personal information
- Full name: Spyridon Sklavounos
- Date of birth: 1912
- Place of birth: Thessaloniki, Greece
- Position: Goalkeeper

Senior career*
Years	Team	Apps	(Gls)
1929−1931	Thermaikos		
1931−1935	Panathinaikos		
1935−1940	AEK Athens	6	(0)

International career
1932–1938	Greece	8	(0)
- * Club domestic league appearances and goals

Spyros Sklavounos (Greek: Σπύρος Σκλαβούνος; 1912 – ?) was a Greek footballer who played as a goalkeeper. He played in eight matches for the Greece national football team from 1932 to 1938. He was also part of Greece's team for their qualification matches for the 1938 FIFA World Cup.

== Club career ==
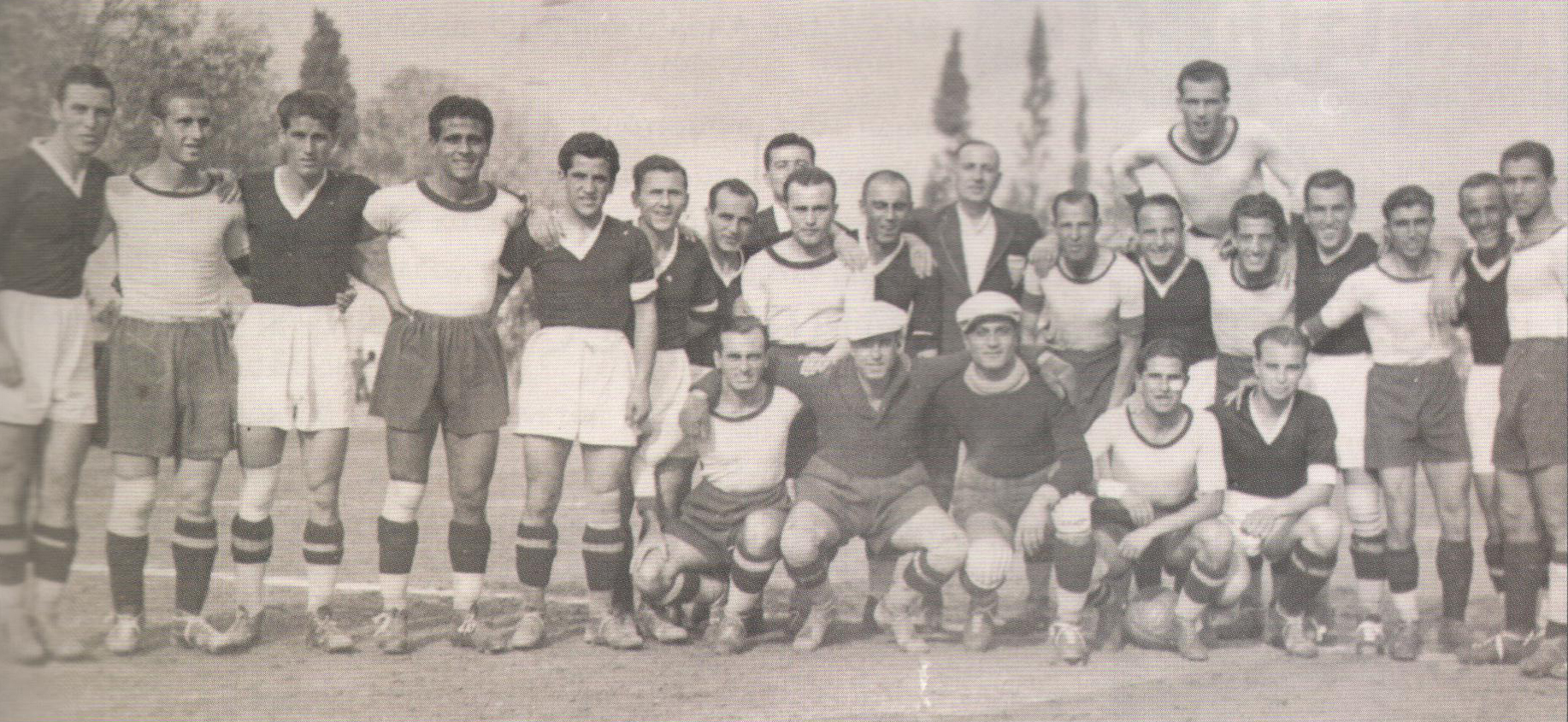
Players of AEK Athens and PAOK before the 1939 Cup final

Sklavounos started playing football at Thermaikos in 1929. His uncle, Alexandros was one of the founders as well as the president of Thermaikos and with his personal intervention in 1931, he moved to Panathinaikos, despite the interest of Aris. With the "greens" he won an Athens FCA League in 1934. In 1935 he joined AEK Athens, where he won the first ever domestic double by a Greek club in 1939 and the Athens FCA League and Panhellenic Championship of the following season. He ended his football career in 1940.

== International career ==
Sklavounos played for Greece 8 times, between 1932 and 1938. He was called for the first time to Belgrade for the Balkan Cup matches.

== After football ==
After the end of his football career, in 1948, he took up singing and had an international career, he sang in many shops in Greece, Istanbul, Paris, London and in many more cities.

== Personal life ==
He came from a family of railway workers, his grandfather Panagiotis, alongside his grandmother Roza had participated in the Macedonian struggle. His brother Grigoris was also a football player, competing for many years in Thermaikos.

== Honours ==
Panathinaikos

- Athens FCA League: 1934

AEK Athens

- Panhellenic Championship: 1938–39, 1939–40
- Greek Cup: 1938–39
- Athens FCA League: 1940
