= Alekos Chatzistavridis =

Greek footballer (1915–1998)

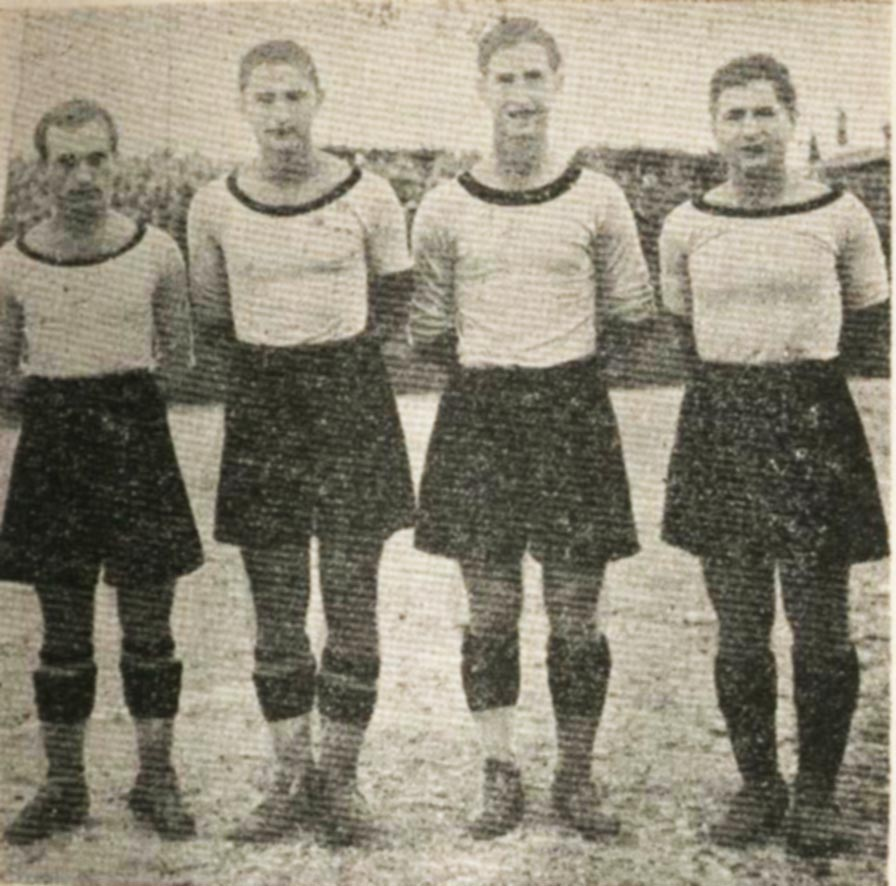
- Chatzistavridis (left) with Tzanetis, Maropoulos and Christodoulou

Personal information
- Full name: Alexios Stavridis
- Date of birth: 1915
- Place of birth: Constantinople, Ottoman Empire
- Date of death: 1998 (aged 82–83)
- Place of death: Piraeus, Greece
- Position: Forward

Youth career
- 1930–1932: Keravnos Tambourion
- 1932–1934: Vyzantion Piraeus

Senior career*
Years	Team	Apps	(Gls)
1934–1943	AEK Athens	6	(2)
1944–1949	Olympiacos	22	(11)
Total		28	(13)

International career
1949	Greece	2	(1)

Managerial career
- 1949–1952: Panpaianiakos
- 1957–1958: Egaleo
- 1959–1960: AE Nikea
- 1961–1962: Olympiacos
- 1962–1963: Atromitos
- 1966: Panaspropyrgiakos
- 1967: Proodeftiki
- * Club domestic league appearances and goals

Alekos Chatzistavridis (Greek: Αλέκος Χατζησταυρίδης; 1915 – 1998) was a Greek footballer who played as a forward and a later manager. His real name was "Stavridis".

== Club career ==
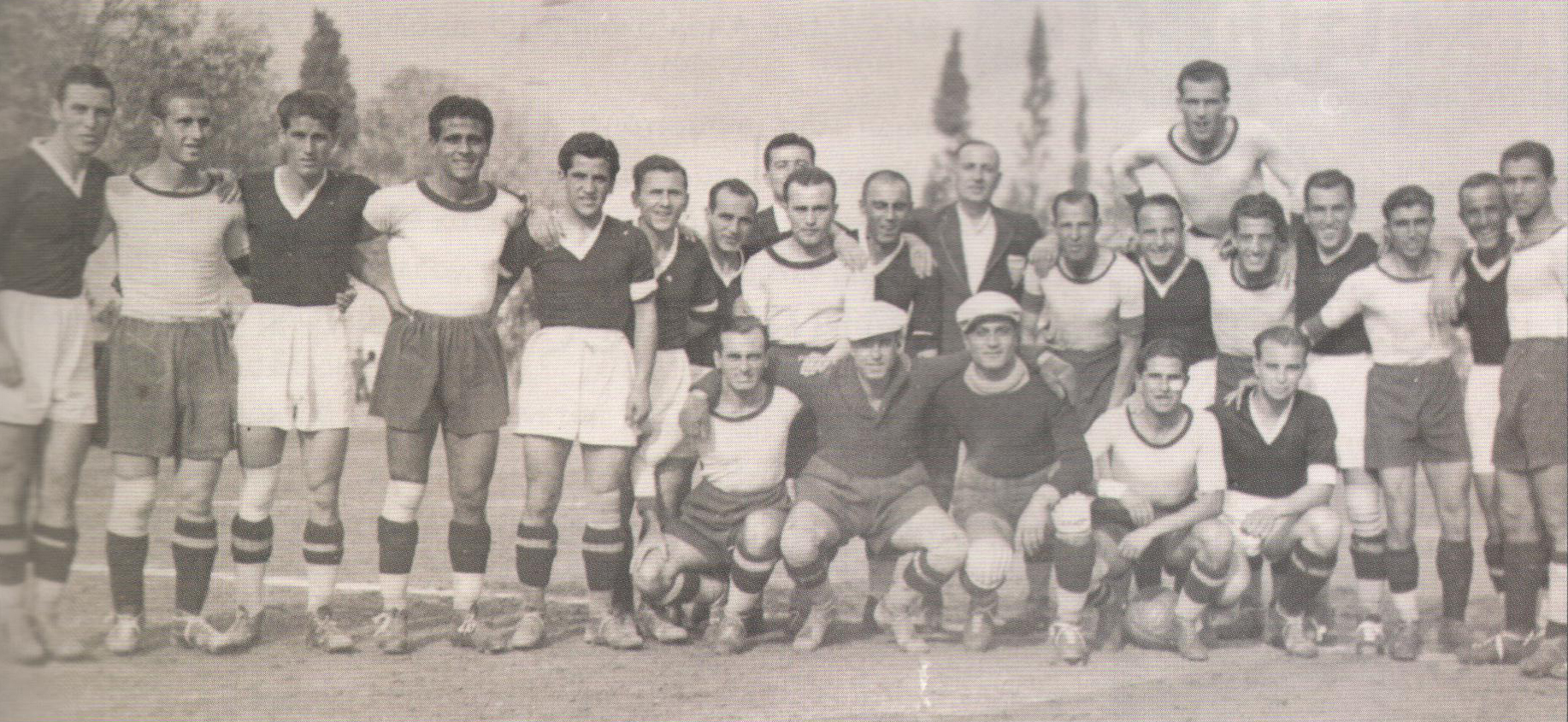
Players of AEK Athens and PAOK before the 1939 Cup final

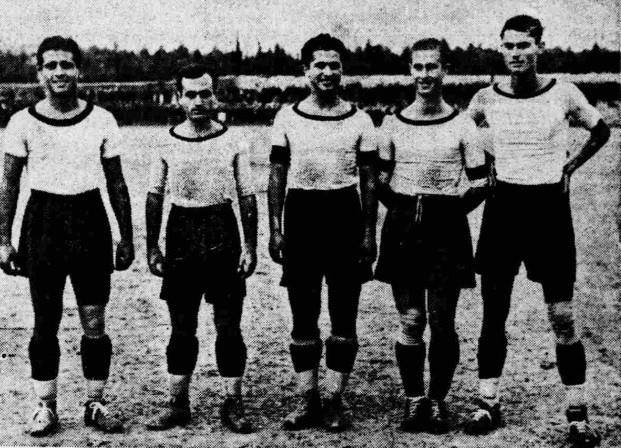
Vasiliou with Chatzistavridis, Tzanetis, Maropoulos and Kitidis in 1940

Chatzistavridis started football at Vyzantion Piraeus. In 1933 he joined AEK Athens and changed his name to "Chatzistavridis", because he officially belonged to his previous club. He established himself as one of the main players in the team's offense. On 28 May 1939, he opened the score in the Greek Cup final, defeating PAOK by 2–1. He played with the "yellow-blacks" for a decade and won 2 consecutive Panhellenic Championships, 1 Cup and 1 Athens FCA Championship in 1940, including the first domestic double in by a Greek club in 1939.

In 1944, during the period of the Occupation, when Greek football was inactive and Chatzistavridis joined Olympiacos. On 30 June 1946 he was expelled in the match against AEK alongside his former teammate Kleanthis Maropoulos. On 8 June 1947, he played in the 5–0 win against Iraklis in the Cup final. He played as a regular at the club of Piraeus, until 1949, when he ended his career as a footballer. At Olympiacos he won in total another 2 consecutive Panhellenic Championships, 1 Cup and 4 consecutive Piraeus FCA Championships, including another domestic double in by a Greek club in 1947.

== International career ==
Chatzistavridis played in two games with Greece under Kostas Negrepontis, for the Mediterranean Cup in May 1949 both held at Leoforos Alexandras Stadium. His debut was on 16 May in the 1–2 defeat against Turkey, coming in as a sub at the 46th minute in the place of Giannis Petsanas. He scored his only international goal in his second and final appearance on 18 May, playing the full match in the 1–3 defeat against Egypt.

== Managerial career ==
Immeditately after his retirement as a footballer, Chatzistavridis enacted with coaching at Pampaianikos Peanias until 1952. Afterwards, he took as various clubs such as Egaleo, AE Nikea, Olympiacos for 6 months and a brief spell at Proodeftiki. In 1962 he was the manager of Atromitos for a season. On 7 August 1966 he took charge of Panaspropyrgiakos.

== Personal life ==
Chatzistavridis fought in the World War II and in the battle of Tepelenë and was seriously injured in the leg, where he recovered after great efforts. He died in 1998 at Piraeus.

== Honours ==
AEK Athens

- Panhellenic Championship: 1938–39, 1939–40
- Greek Cup: 1938–39
- Athens FCA League: 1940

Olympiacos

- Panhellenic Championship: 1946–47, 1947–48
- Greek Cup: 1946–47
- Piraeus FCA League: 1946, 1947, 1948, 1949
