= Giorgos Gasparis =

Giorgos Gasparis may refer to:

- Giorgos Gasparis (basketball)
- Giorgos Gasparis, Greek footballer (1913–1978)
