= Kontoulis =

Kontoulis is a surname. Notable people with the surname include:

- Alexandros Kontoulis (1859–1933), Greek general
- Spyros Kontoulis, Greek footballer
