= Kimonas Deligiannis =

Greek footballer

Personal information
- Date of birth: 1914
- Position: Midfielder

International career
Years	Team	Apps	(Gls)
1936–1938	Greece	3	(0)

Kimonas Deligiannis (born 1914, date of death unknown) was a Greek footballer. He played in three matches for the Greece national football team from 1936 to 1938. He was also part of Greece's team for their qualification matches for the 1938 FIFA World Cup.
