= Lefteris Makris =

Greek footballer

Personal information
- Date of birth: 1913

International career
Years	Team	Apps	(Gls)
1938	Greece	1	(1)

Lefteris Makris (born 1913, date of death unknown) was a Greek footballer. He played in one match for the Greece national football team in 1938. He was also part of Greece's team for their qualification matches for the 1938 FIFA World Cup.

== International goal ==
#	Date	Opponent	Score	Result	Competition
1.	25 March 1938	Hungary	1-11	1-11	1938 FIFA World Cup qualification
