= Kostas Vasiliou =

Cypriot footballer and manager (1914–2003)

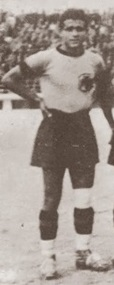
- Kostas Vasiliou with AEK Athens

Personal information
- Full name: Konstantinos Vasiliou
- Date of birth: 1914
- Place of birth: Limassol, Cyprus
- Date of death: 1 May 2003 (aged 88–89)
- Place of death: Limassol, Cyprus
- Position: Forward

Senior career*
Years	Team	Apps	(Gls)
1934–1935	EPA Larnaca		
1935–1936	APOEL		
1936–1945	AEK Athens	4	(4)
1945–1947	APOEL		
1947–1948	AEL Limassol (player-coach)		
1949–1950	Anorthosis Famagusta (player-coach)		

International career
1944	Greece	3	(3)

Managerial career
- 1951–1953: Anorthosis Famagusta
- 1953–1955: Nea Salamina
- 1961–1962: Nea Salamina
- 1964–1965: Nea Salamina
- * Club domestic league appearances and goals

Kostas Vasiliou (Greek: Κώστας Βασιλείου; 1914 – 1 May 2003), was a Cypriot footballer who played as a forward and later a manager.

== Club career ==
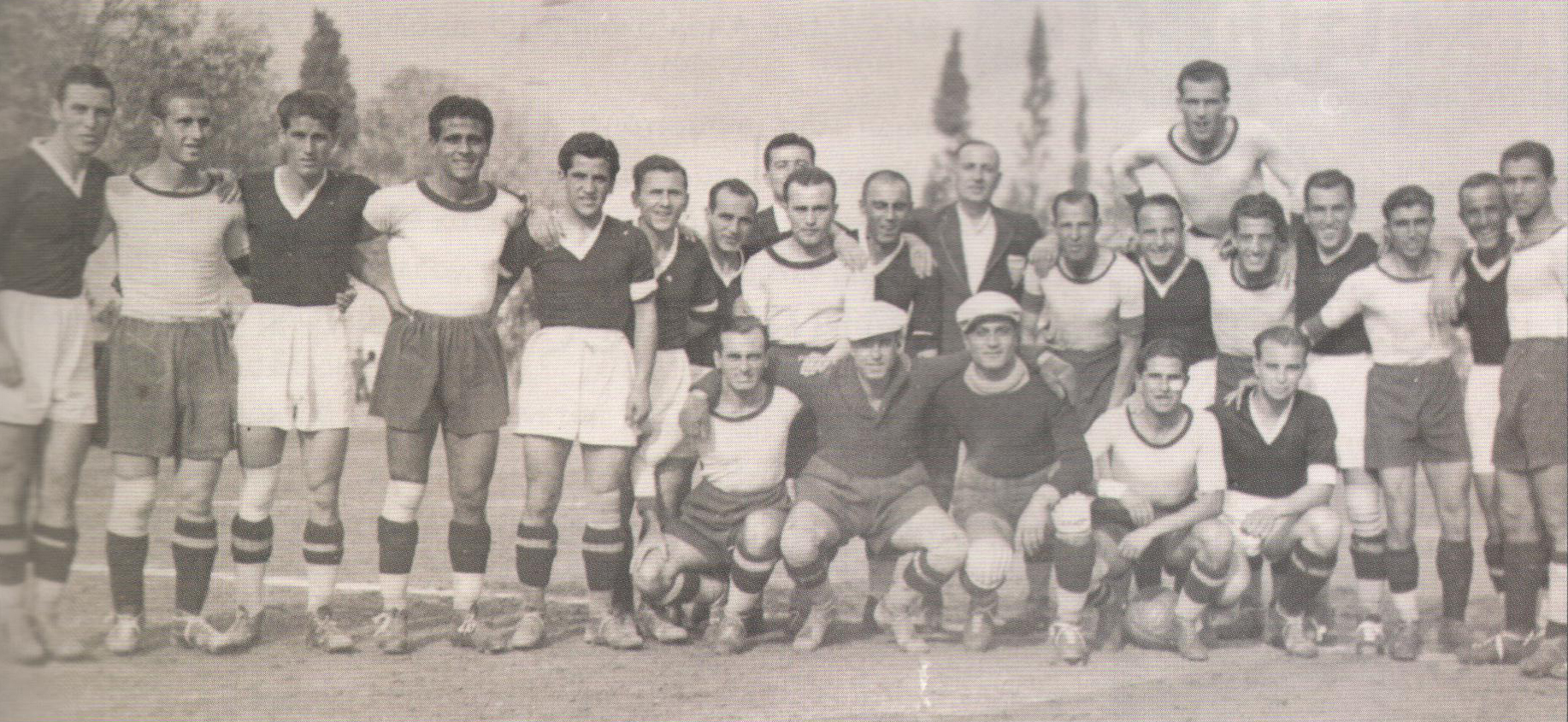
Players of AEK Athens and PAOK before the 1939 Cup final

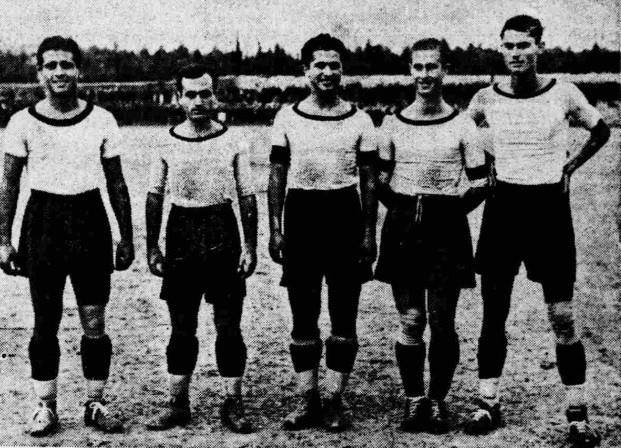
Vasiliou (left) with Chatzistavridis, Tzanetis, Maropoulos and Kitidis in 1940

Vasiliou started his football career at EPA Larnaca in 1934. In 1935 he moved to APOEL, where he won the championship in 1936.

In 1936 he was transferred to AEK Athens, becoming the first Cypriot to play for the club. With AEK he won the Panhellenic Championship and the Greek Cup in 1939, as well as the Panhellenic Championship 1940. During his stay in Greece, Vasiliou played with the Greek national team in three friendly matches.

In 1945 he returned to Cyprus and APOEL, where he won the domestic double in 1947 with the conquest of the championship and the Cypriot Cup. In 1947 he took over as a player-coach of AEL Limassol, with which he won the Cup in 1948. In 1949 he moved to Anorthosis Famagusta as a player-coach, leading them to the conquest of the league for the first time of their history in 1950.

== Managerial career ==
After retiring as a footballer, Vasiliou returned to Anorthosis and assumed the position of the coach from 1951 to 1953. He then signed at Nea Salamina in 1954, leading the team to win the Cypriot Second Division in 1955 and get the promotion to the first division for the first time in their history.

== Personal life ==
Vasiliou was the first husband of the famous Greek actress, Rena Vlahopoulou, whom he met at Corfu in 1938 and married a year later. The couple broke up in 1943. He was a photographer by profession. His son, Giorgos was also a footballer. His great-grandson, Nikos Englezou was also a footballer who played for AEK Athens from 2011 to 2013. Vasiliou died on 1 May 2003.

== Honours ==
=== As a player ===
APOEL

- Cypriot First Division: 1935–36, 1946–47
- Cypriot Cup: 1946–47

AEK Athens

- Panhellenic Championship: 1938–39, 1939–40
- Greek Cup: 1938–39

Individual

- Panhellenic Championship top scorer: 1938–39

=== Player-coach ===
AEL Limassol

- Cypriot Cup: 1947–48

Anorthosis Famagusta

- Cypriot First Division: 1949–50

=== Coach ===
Nea Salamina

- Cypriot Second Division: 1954–55
