= Tryfon Tzanetis =

Greek footballer and manager (1918–1998)

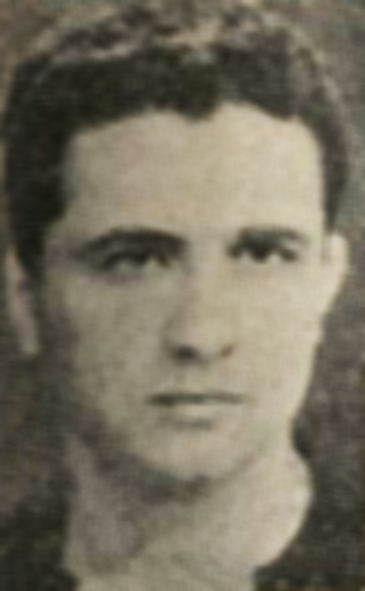
- Tryfon Tzanetis

Personal information
- Date of birth: 1918
- Place of birth: Urla, Smyrna, Ottoman Empire
- Date of death: 8 September 1998 (aged 79–80)
- Place of death: Athens, Greece
- Positions: Striker; center back

Youth career
- –1932: AE Kalogreza
- 1932–1933: PO Olympiacos Nea Ionia
- 1933–1934: Ermis Nea Ionia
- 1934–1935: Eleftheroupoli
- 1935: AEK Athens

Senior career*
Years	Team	Apps	(Gls)
1935–1951	AEK Athens	19	(1)
Total		19	(1)

International career
1949	Greece	1	(0)

Managerial career
- 1951: AEK Athens
- 1951–1952: Egaleo
- 1957–1958: AEK Athens
- 1958–1959: Egaleo
- 1960–1961: Greece
- 1961–1962: AEK Athens
- 1962–1964: Greece
- 1965–1966: AEK Athens
- 1967: Apollon Athens
- 1967–1968: Apollon Athens
- * Club domestic league appearances and goals

Tryfon Tzanetis (Greek: Τρύφων Τζανετής; 1918 – 8 September 1998) was a Greek footballer and later a manager. He was best known as an important figure of AEK Athens during the 1930s and 1940s, partnering Kleanthis Maropoulos in AEK's offense. Tzanetis also served AEK from the position of the manager during the 1950s and 1960s.

== Early life ==
Tzanetis was born in 1918 in Smyrna to Naxian parents. After the Asia Minor disaster, his family moved to Athens and installed at the district of Nea Ionia.

== Club career ==
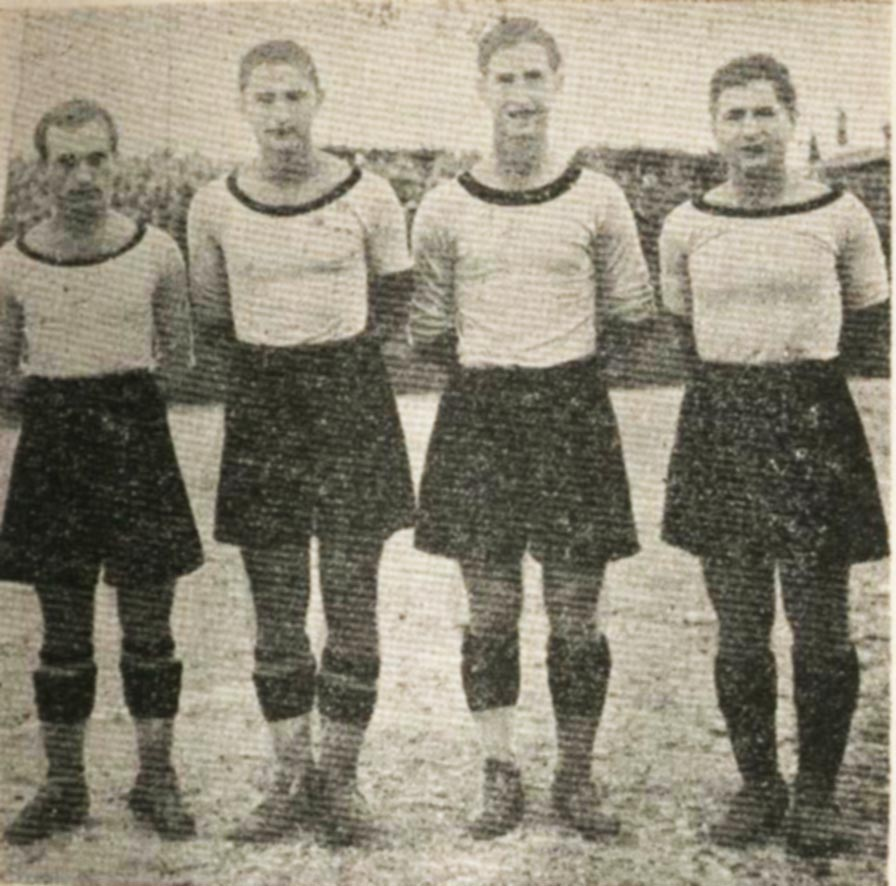
Chatzistavridis, Tzanetis, Maropoulos and Christodoulou in 1939

=== Early years ===
Tzanetis started playing football at his local club of AE Kalogreza. In the following season, he became a member of the first team at PO Olympiacos Nea Ionia, earning the distinction of being the youngest player on the roster. He stayed at the club for one year. In 1933, he moved to Ermis Nea Ionia and after one year, he signed to Eleftheroupoli.

=== AEK Athens ===
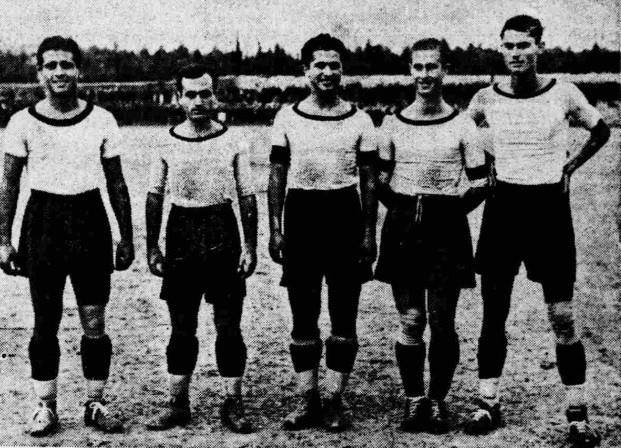
Vasiliou (left) with Chatzistavridis, Tzanetis, Maropoulos and Kitidis in 1940

In 1935, people of AEK Athens scouted him and he signed a sport's card with the club. He started from the reserve team of the club and later he was promoted to the men's team alongside Maropoulos and participated in an official match. Over the following years, he established himself as a regular member of the first team at AEK Athens.

He was a member to the great team of the yellow-blacks in the late 30s, having teammates, such as Kleanthis Maropoulos, Spyros Sklavounos and Spyros Kontoulis. He started his career as a striker, but later in his career he became a central defender, when the manager, Jack Beby relocated him, in the WM system that he applied since he came to Greece in 1948. His presence was imposing. He was insightful, extremely fast, creative and team and in addition to being an aggressive midfielder, he was also distinguished by his inhibitions. With AEK he won 4 times the FCA Championship, 2 consecutive Panhellenic Championships and 3 Greek Cups, including the first domestic double by a Greek club in 1939. On 9 February 1951 after the manager of AEK, Jack Beby departed unexpectedly, he took charge of the training of the team and after the end of the season he retired as a footballer.

== International career ==
He wore once the jersey of Greece on 25 May 1949, against Italy B in a 2–3 defeat, with Tzanetis coming from the bench on the 46th minute.

== Managerial career ==
On 20 September 1951 with the arrival of the new manager, Mario Magnozzi, Tzanetis left AEK. Afterwards, he took charge of Egaleo in the first division of Athens for a season. He was also a selector of the Greece military national football team, where he won the World Military Cup in 1962. From 1960 to 1964 (in two different periods) he was the manager of Greece with a record of 5 wins, 1 draw and 5 losses.

Throughout his managerial career he assumed the position of the manager of AEK in many periods during the 50s and the 60s. On 27 July 1965 he returned to AEK Athens and in his first season he won the Cup. On 20 December 1966 he submitted his resignation, citing the negative effect that criticism from a section of the supporters was having on his players and their performances. Despite the administration's efforts to change his decision, his resignation was accepted three days later.

On 18 January 1967, Tzanetis took charge of Apollon Athens, where he remained until the end of the season. After a few months he returned to the club, until 15 June which it would be the last of his career.

== After football ==
Tzanetis had a wife named Lela and two kids, Manolis and Mary. He identified on the pitch and in life with Kleanthis Maropoulos, with whom he remained friends and partners in a sporting goods store in the center of Athens, until the end of the latter's life, in 1991. Seven years later, Tzanetis died.

== Honours ==
=== As a player ===
AEK Athens

- Panhellenic Championship: 1938–39, 1939–40
- Greek Cup: 1938–39, 1948–49, 1949–50
- Athens FCA Championship: 1940, 1946, 1947, 1950

=== As a manager ===
AEK Athens

- Greek Cup: 1965–66

Greece military

- World Military Cup: 1962

== See also ==
- List of one-club men in association football
