= Christos Ribas =

Greek footballer (1914–1981)

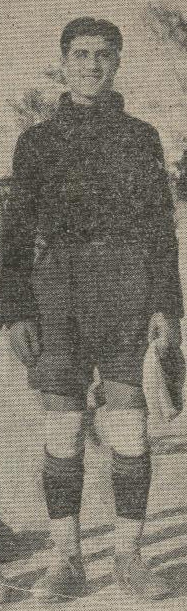
- Ribas with AEK Athens

Personal information
- Date of birth: 1914
- Place of birth: Manisa, Ottoman Empire
- Date of death: 18 October 1981 (aged 66–67)
- Place of death: Athens, Greece
- Position: Goalkeeper

Youth career
- 1927: AE Nea Ionia
- 1928–1929: AEK Athens

Senior career*
Years	Team	Apps	(Gls)
1929−1948	AEK Athens	59	(0)

International career
1933–1936	Greece	9	(0)

Managerial career
- 1957–1958: AEK Athens (assistant)
- 1959–1961: AEK Athens (assistant)
- 1961−1962: Egaleo
- 1962–1963: Ilisiakos
- 1965: Asteras Zografou
- 1966: Olympiacos Loutraki
- 1968–1969: Panelefsiniakos
- 1969: Olympiacos Loutraki
- * Club domestic league appearances and goals

Christos Ribas (Greek: Χρήστος Ρίμπας; 1914 – 18 October 1981) was a Greek footballer who played as a goalkeeper for AEK Athens and a manager. His nickname was "the Bird" (Greek: "το Πουλί").

== Club career ==
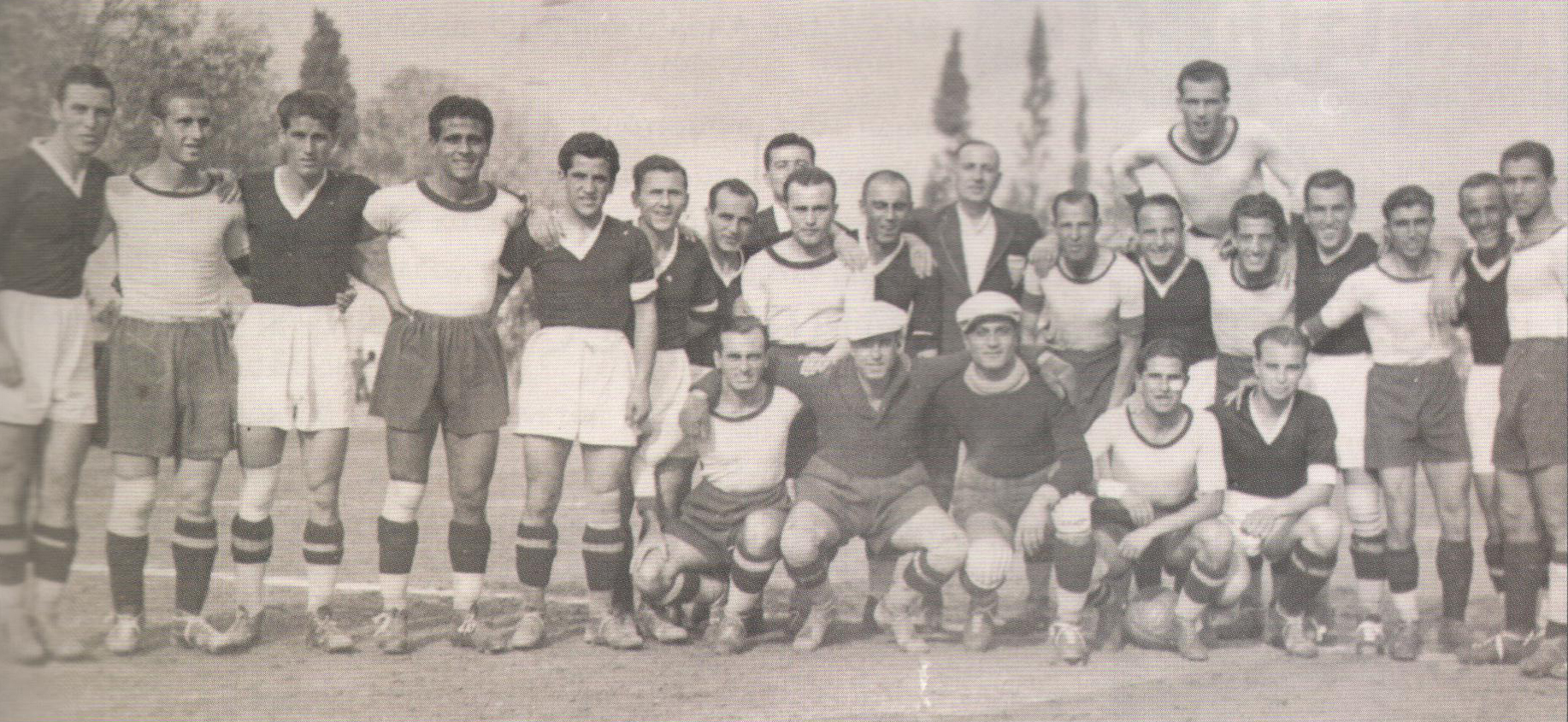
Players of AEK Athens and PAOK before the 1939 Cup final

Ribas started football in 1927, at the age of 14, playing as a striker for Atromitos Nea Ionia. The following year the Hungarian manager József Schweng watched him play as a goalkeeper for the Athens College Branch team at the stadium of Panellinios and invited him to enroll in the infrastructure sections of AEK Athens.

In 1929 he was promoted to the first team and in 5 May of that year, he made his debut against Ferencvárosi, for the Easter Cup. On 27 December 1931, he impressed with his performance against Wacker, for the Christmas Cup. On 28 May 1939, Ribas played in the Cup final against PAOK, at Leoforos Alexandras Stadium, where AEK won their second Cup in their history winning by 2–1. He was the main goalkeeper of AEK Athens until the end of his career as a footballer in 1947, winning two consecutive Panhellenic Championships, two Cups and three Athens FCA Championships, including the first domestic double in by a Greek club in 1939.

== International career ==
Ribas played nine times for Greece including his last one as captain. In 1933, he was invited to the Balkan mixed team for a match against the World mixed team, which was eventually postponed.

== After football ==
After the end of his career as a footballer, Ribas was involved with AEK, becoming a member of their staff, while also managing clubs, such as Egaleo, Asteras Zografou, Olympiacos Loutraki, Panelefsiniakos, Elefsina and Marko.

== Personal life ==
Ribas was married to Eleni and had five children named Apostolos, Panagiota, Michalis, Nikos and Anastasia. His son Apostolos was an agent of AEK Athens during the 1980s.

He died on 18 October 1981 from an incurable illness.

== Honours ==
AEK Athens

- Panhellenic Championship: 1938–39, 1939–40
- Greek Cup: 1931–32, 1938–39
- Athens FCA League: 1940, 1946, 1947

== See also ==
- List of one-club men in association football
