= Konstantinos Gikas =

Greek footballer

Personal information
- Full name: Konstantinos Gikas
- Date of birth: 1913
- Date of death: 1980 (aged 66–67)

International career
Years	Team	Apps	(Gls)
1930–1938	Greece	5	(0)

Konstantinos Gikas (1913 – 1980) was a Greek footballer. He played in five matches for the Greece national football team from 1930 to 1938. He was also part of Greece's team for their qualification matches for the 1938 FIFA World Cup.
