= József Nemes =

Hungarian footballer

Personal information
- Date of birth: 12 January 1914
- Place of birth: Budapest, Austria-Hungary
- Date of death: 17 October 1987 (aged 73)

International career
Years	Team	Apps	(Gls)
1938	Hungary	1	(3)

József Nemes (12 January 1914 – 17 October 1987) was a Hungarian footballer. He played in one match for the Hungary national football team in 1938. He was also named in Hungary's squad for the Group 6 qualification tournament for the 1938 FIFA World Cup.
