= Nikos Sotiriadis =

Greek footballer

Personal information
- Full name: Nikolaos Sotiriadis
- Date of birth: 1908
- Place of birth: Mudanya, Ottoman Empire
- Date of death: 28 January 1941 (aged 32–33)
- Place of death: Këlcyrë, Albania
- Position: Goalkeeper

Youth career
- Lefkos Asteras

Senior career*
| Years | Team | Apps | (Gls) |
| 1932–1940 | PAOK | | |

International career
| 1938 | Greece | 1 | (0) |
- * Club domestic league appearances and goals

Nikolaos Sotiriadis (1908 – 28 January 1941) was a Greek international footballer, competing as a goalkeeper for PAOK. He was killed in the Greco-Italian War in 1941.

== Career ==
He was born in 1908 in Moudania, Bursa Province of the Ottoman Empire. In 1922 he came with his refugee family and settled in Thessaloniki. He started playing football for Lefkos Asteras, where he was spotted by PAOK officials and in 1932 he joined the team. Initially he was a substitute for Chalkias. He made his debut on February 19, 1933 in a 4–1 win against Iraklis.

With PAOK, he won the Macedonia Football Clubs Association (Greek: Ένωση Ποδοσφαιρικών Σωματείων Μακεδονίας or Ε.Π.Σ.Μ.) local championship in 1937 and in 1940 they were runners-up in the Panhellenic Championship losing 5–3 on aggregate to AEK Athens. He also participated in the 1939 Greek Cup final, a 2–1 loss against AEK.

Sotiriadis made one international appearance with Greece. On 20 February 1938, during a World Cup qualifier against Mandatory Palestine (a 1–0 win) at Leoforos Alexandras Stadium, he came on as a substitute in the 15th minute, replacing Sclavounos. Sotiriadis thus became PAOK's first international and the only one during the interwar period.

== Death ==
Sotiriadis was recruited by the Hellenic Army after the declaration of the Greco-Italian War. Trying to capture an Italian outpost, he was shot in the chest and died on 28 January 1941 in Kleisura, fighting with the rank of Sergeant for the 50th Infantry Regiment. He was 33 years old.
