= Spyros Depountis =

Greek footballer

Personal information
- Date of birth: 1918
- Date of death: 2004 (aged 85–86)
- Position: Forward

Youth career
- Panathinaikos

Senior career*
Years	Team	Apps	(Gls)
–1946	Olympiacos		

International career
1936–1938	Greece	2	(0)
- * Club domestic league appearances and goals

Spyros Depountis (1918 – 2004) was a Greek footballer. He played in two matches for the Greece national football team from 1936 to 1938. He was also part of Greece's team for their qualification matches for the 1938 FIFA World Cup.
