= Nikos Tsaganias =

Greek footballer

Personal information
- Date of birth: 1915

International career
Years	Team	Apps	(Gls)
1938	Greece	1	(0)

Nikos Tsaganias (born 1915, date of death unknown) was a Greek footballer. He played in one match for the Greece national football team in 1938. He was also part of Greece's team for their qualification matches for the 1938 FIFA World Cup.
