= Giorgos Gasparis (footballer, born 1913) =

Greek footballer (1913–1977)

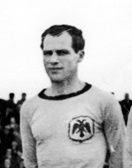
- Giorgos Gasparis in 1947

Personal information
- Full name: Georgios Gasparis
- Date of birth: 1913
- Place of birth: Smyrna, Ottoman Empire
- Date of death: 19 February 1977 (aged 63–64)
- Place of death: Athens, Greece
- Position: Defender

Youth career
- 1927–1930: Ethnikos Kaisariani

Senior career*
Years	Team	Apps	(Gls)
1930–1936	Apollon Athens		
1936–1937	AEK Piraeus		
1937–1950	AEK Athens	11	(1)

International career
1935–1938	Greece	5	(0)

Managerial career
- 1951–1954: Ethnikos Asteras
- 1954–1955: Esperos Kallitheas
- 1968–1970: AEK Athens (assistant)
- 1970–1971: Greece U21
- 1972–1973: Greece (assistant)
- * Club domestic league appearances and goals

Giorgos Gasparis (Greek: Γιώργος Γάσπαρης; 1913–19 February 1977) was a Greek professional footballer who played as a defender.

== Club career ==
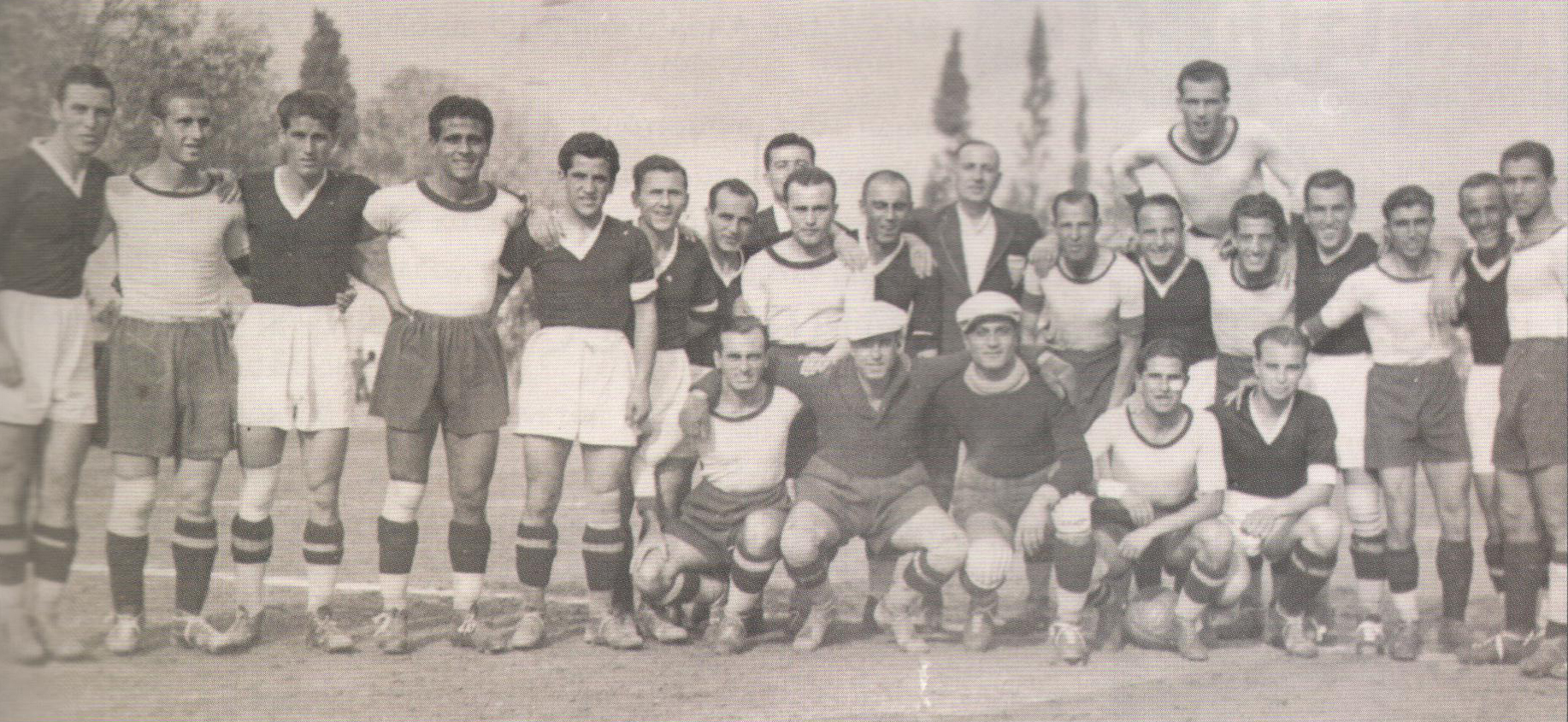
Players of AEK Athens and PAOK before the 1939 Cup final

Gasparis started football in 1927 at Ethnikos Kaisariani and in 1930 he moved to Apollon Athens. In 1936 AEK Athens wanted to sign him, but since Apollon weren't intending in giving him. Thus, he moved to AEK Piraeus for a season and in 1937 he joined AEK Athens. He played at the club until 1950, where he retired from playing at the age of 37. During his 14-year presence in the club, he was a key player in the defense of the team helping them win 2 consecutive Panhellenic Championships, 3 Greek Cups and 4 Athens FCA League, including the first domestic double by a Greek club in 1939.

== International career ==
Gasparis played with Greece 5 times. His debut took place in the matches for the 5th Balkan Cup in Sofia in June 1935 against Bulgaria and Romania. He also played in a friendly against Egypt in Cairo on 19 June 1936 and in both qualification matches for the 1938 FIFA World Cup. against Palestine.

== Managerial career ==
After completing his football career, Gasparis became a manager and served on the bench of several clubs. He worked at Ethnikos Asteras fron 1951 to 1954 and then for Esperos Kallitheas. On 2 September 1968 he was hired as the assistant of Branko Stanković at AEK Athens until 4 August 1970, when he became the manager of Greece U21. In 1973 he also worked as an assistant manager of Billy Bingham in Greece.

== Personal life ==
Gasparis died on 19 February 1977 after struggling with a long term illness.

== Honours ==
AEK Athens

- Panhellenic Championship: 1938–39, 1939–40
- Greek Cup: 1938–39, 1948–49, 1949–50
- Athens FCA League: 1940, 1946, 1947, 1950
