= József Háda =

Hungarian footballer

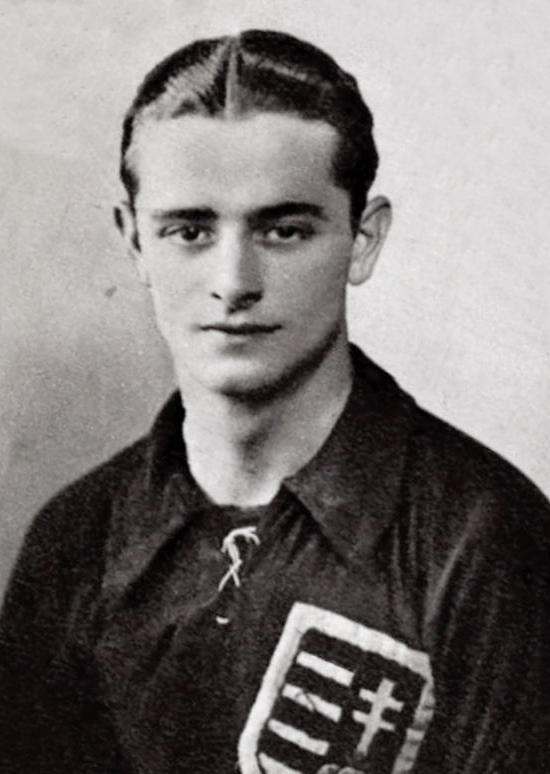

Personal information
- Date of birth: 2 March 1911
- Place of birth: Budapest, Austria-Hungary
- Date of death: 11 January 1994 (aged 82)
- Place of death: Budapest, Hungary
- Position: Goalkeeper

Senior career*
Years	Team	Apps	(Gls)
1930–1939	Ferencvárosi TC	138	(0)

International career
1932–1938	Hungary	16	(0)

Managerial career
- 1957–1959: Sudan
Medal record
Men's football
Representing Hungary(as player)
FIFA World Cup
Runner-up	1938 France
Representing Sudan (as manager)
Africa Cup of Nations
Runner-up	1959 United Arab Republic
Third place	1957 Sudan
- * Club domestic league appearances and goals

József Háda (2 March 1911 - 11 January 1994) was a Hungarian football goalkeeper who played for Hungary in the 1934 and 1938 FIFA World Cups. He also played for Ferencvárosi TC.

== Honours ==
=== Player ===
Hungary

- FIFA World Cup runners-up: 1938

=== Manager ===
Sudan

- African Cup of Nations: runner-up, 1959; 3rd place, 1957
