= Vasilios Manettas =

Greek footballer

Vasilis Manettas
Personal information
- Full name: Vasilios Manettas
- Date of birth: 1 January 1917
- Place of birth: Smyrna, Ottoman Empire
- Date of death: 18 June 2003 (aged 86)
- Place of death: Athens, Greece
- Position: Forward

Senior career*
Years	Team	Apps	(Gls)
1935–1945	AEK Athens	3	(0)
1945–1951	Daphni Athens		

International career
1938	Greece	1	(0)
- * Club domestic league appearances and goals

Vasilios Manettas or Lappas (Greek: Βασίλης Μανέττας ή Λάππας; 1 January 1917 – 18 June 2003) was a Greek footballer who played as a forward.

== Early life ==
Manettas was born in Smyrna on the New Year of 1917. During the Asia Minor Disaster he lost his father, Theodoros Lappas and in September 1922 he came to Greece with his mother Heleni Manetta and his two older brothers.

== Club career ==
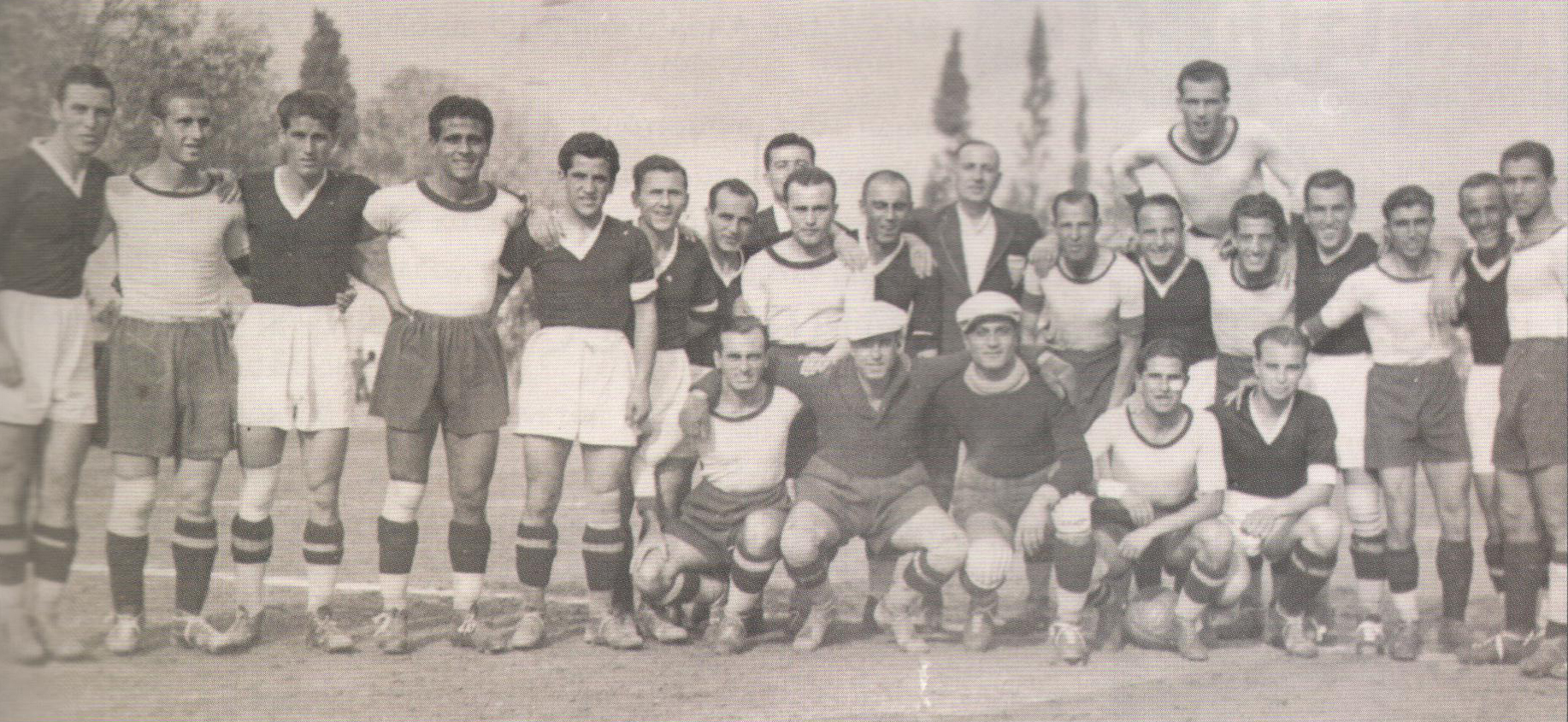
Players of AEK Athens and PAOK before the 1939 Cup final

Manettas started his football career in 1935 at AEK Athens where he stayed for a decade until 1945. He won at AEK 2 consecutive Panhellenic Championships, 2 Greek Cups and 1 Athens FCA League, including the first domestic double by a Greek club in 1939. In 1945 he joined Daphni Athens, where he completed his career in 1951.

== International career ==
Manettas played in one match for Greece on 20 February 1938 against Palestine. for the FIFA World Cup qualifiers.

== Honours ==
AEK Athens

- Panhellenic Championship: 1938–39, 1939–40
- Greek Cup: 1931–32, 1938–39
- Athens FCA League: 1940
