= Spyros Kontoulis =

Greek footballer

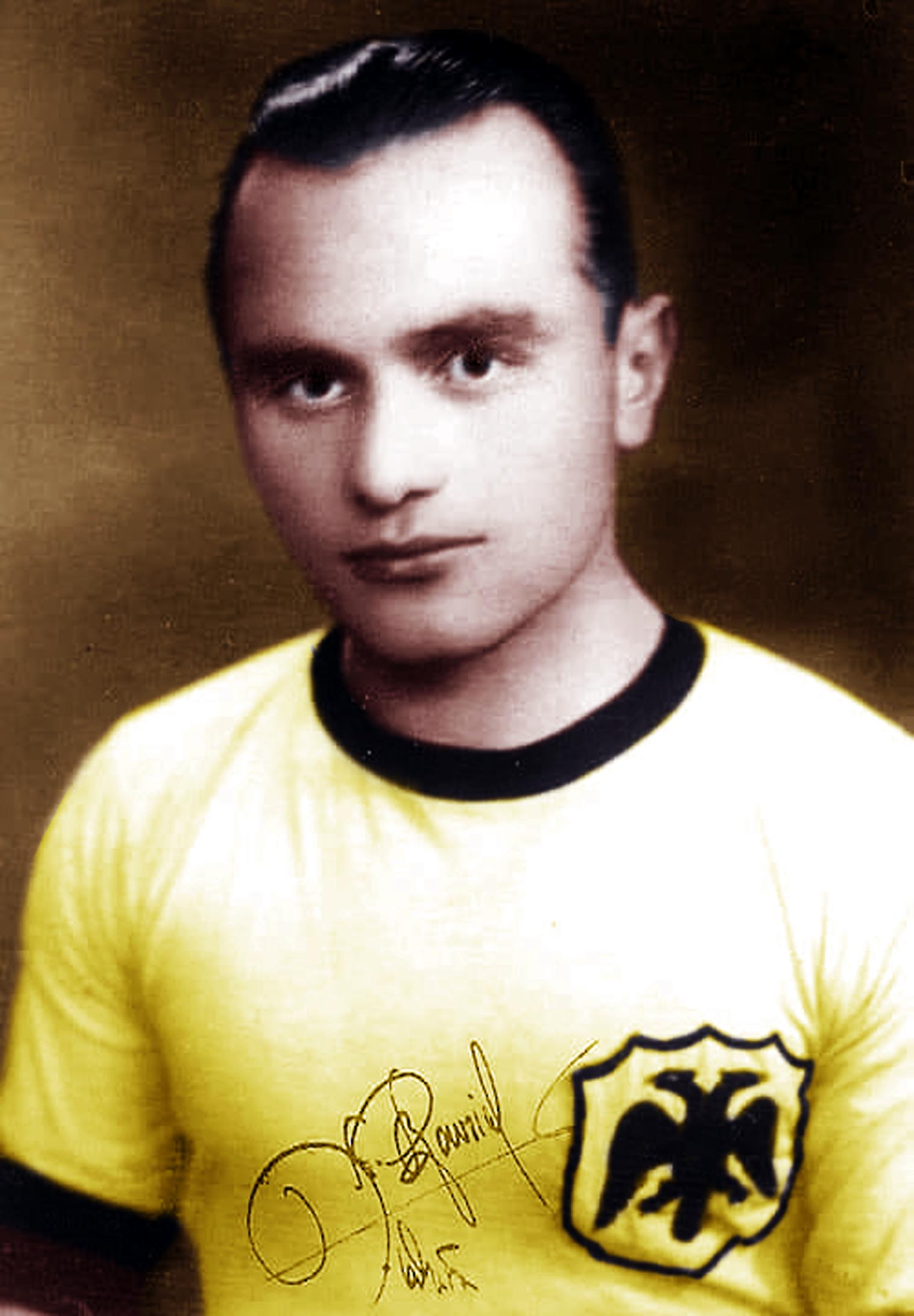
- Spyros Kontoulis in AEK's shirt

Personal information
- Full name: Spyridon Kontoulis
- Date of birth: 1915
- Place of birth: İzmir, Anatolia, Ottoman Empire
- Date of death: June 1944 (aged 28–29)
- Place of death: Athens, Greece
- Position: Midfielder

Senior career*
Years	Team	Apps	(Gls)
1929–1935	Amyna Kokkinia		
1935–1944	AEK Athens	30	(1)

International career
1938	Greece	3	(0)
- * Club domestic league appearances and goals

Spyros Kontoulis (Greek: Σπύρος Κοντούλης; 1915 — June 1944) was a Greek footballer who played as a midfielder.

== Club career ==
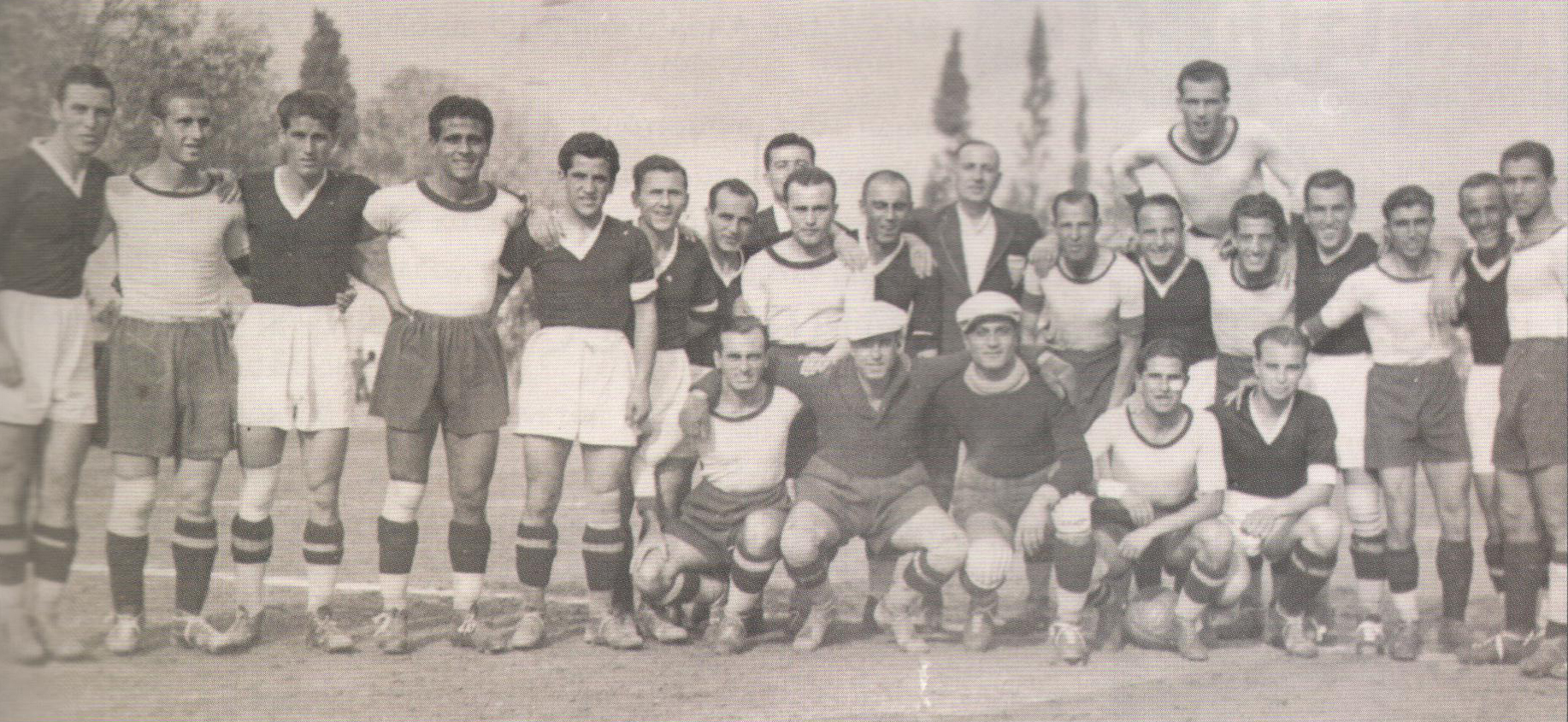
Players of AEK Athens and PAOK before the 1939 Cup final

Kontoulis, being of refugee origin, moved to Kokkina where he grew up. There he took his first football steps at the local club of Amyna Kokkinia, where he played alonside the international forward Theologos Symeonidis.

Ιn 1935 Kontoulis moved to AEK Athens. Until 1940 he managed to make 83 appearances and win two Championships, a Cup and an AFCA league. AEK were in their golden era, winning the last two championships before football activities were inevitably interrupted, due to the invasion of Greece by Italy. Kontoulis interrupted his football career at its peak in order to enlist for the army and leave for the Albanian front. He continued playing for AEK during The Occupation, taking part in unofficial tournaments, until he was arrested and executed by Nazis in 1944.

== International career ==
Kotoulis played in three matches for Greece, competing in the qualification matches for the 1938 FIFA World Cup.

== Death ==
During a battle he was seriously injured in the leg, but managed to survive. He escaped the battlefront, but he did not "escape" the center of Athens during The Occupation. Walking in April 1944 in the Pedion tou Areos to his mother's house to take care of an injury from a football game, Kotoulis was arrested by the occupying forces. He was taken to the Haidari camp, where he met his brother, Vasilis, and his teammate, Kostas Christodoulou (who was tortured, but was eventually able to survive). Because two months after his arrest, in June, Kontoulis was faced with the inevitable. He was being transported with other arrested competitors to Kaisariani to be executed. Attempting to cheat death, he jumped on the move from the truck. Unfortunately, he was too injured to escape. Beaten enough to run away. He was killed by machine gun fire in the middle of the street in Metz. The story is known thanks to the AEK's masseur, Kountouris who was an eyewitness and relayed the tragic news.

== Honours ==
AEK Athens

- Panhellenic Championship: 1938–39, 1939–40
- Greek Cup: 1931–32, 1938–39
- AFCA League: 1939–40
