= Kleanthis Maropoulos =

Greek footballer (1919–1991)

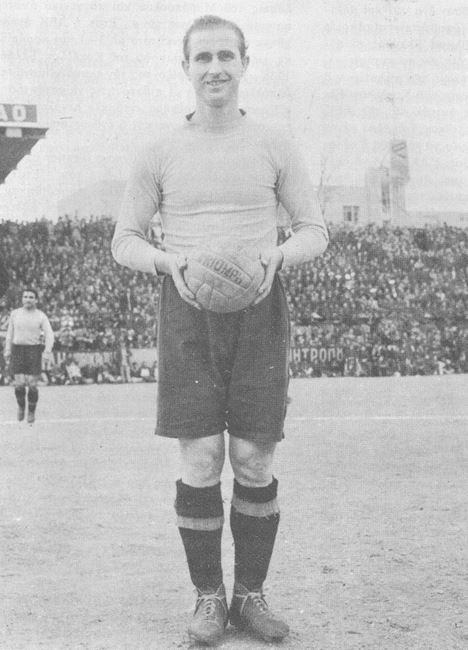
- Kleanthis Maropoulos

Personal information
- Full name: Kleanthis Maropoulos
- Date of birth: 1919
- Place of birth: Constantinople, Ottoman Empire
- Date of death: 3 January 1991 (aged 71–72)
- Place of death: Athens, Greece
- Position: Striker

Youth career
- 1931–1933: Prasina Poulia
- 1933–1935: Ethnikos Kalogreza
- 1935–1936: AEK Athens

Senior career*
Years	Team	Apps	(Gls)
1936–1952	AEK Athens	20	(12)
Total		20	(12)

International career^{‡}
1938–1950	Greece	10	(1)
- * Club domestic league appearances and goals as of 11 October 2023 ‡ National team caps and goals as of 11 October 2023

Kleanthis Maropoulos (Greek: Κλεάνθης Μαρόπουλος; 1919 – 3 January 1991) was a Greek footballer who played as a striker for AEK Athens. He was a star footballer during the 1930s and 1940s and arguably the greatest Greek player of his generation. He was affectionately known as the "Blonde Eagle of AEK" (Greek: "Ξανθός Αετός της ΑΕΚ").

== Club career ==
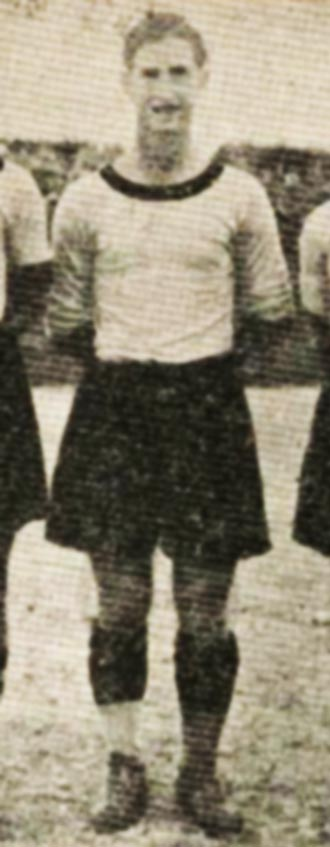
Maropoulos in 1939

=== Early years ===
Born in 1919 to Greek parents in Tuzla, near Constantinople, Maropoulos came to Greece with his family at the age of 3, during the population exchanges, after the Greco-Turkish War in 1922. Having settled in Kalamata, at the age of 12 he joined the local football club Prasina Poulia. When his parents moved to Kalogreza in Athens, he played for Ethnikos Kalogreza. In 1935, he and Tryfon Tzanetis, were spotted by people of AEK Athens, who placed them in their youth team. In 1936, he was promoted to the men's team.

=== AEK Athens ===
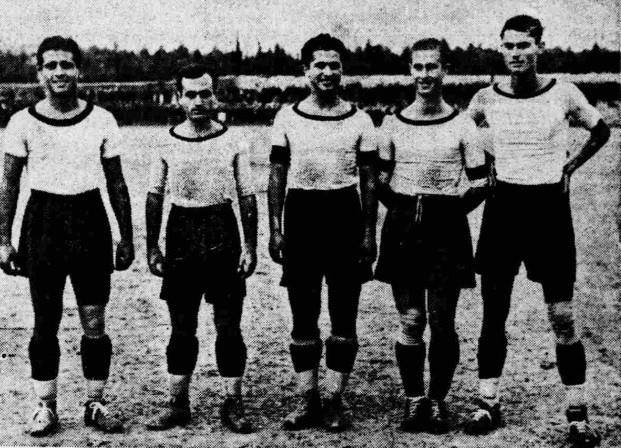
Vasiliou (left) with Chatzistavridis, Tzanetis, Maropoulos and Kitidis in 1940

Maropoulos played in AEK's attack and he was the fear of the opposing goalkeepers with his deadly shot. The slogan "You cannot, Maropoulos!" (Greek: "Δεν μπορείς Μαρόπουλε!") was originally chanted by the opponent fans, but later on came to be a chant of the fans shouted at him to make him bitter or stubborn and make him tear the opponent nets. Led by Maropoulos and under the instructions of the club's former glory, Kostas Negrepontis, AEK won their first two Panhellenic Championships in 1939 and 1940, including the first domestic double ever won by a Greek club.

Unfortunately, the glory years of AEK and Maropoulos were interrupted by the World War II. During The Occupation, he actively participated in the Union of Greek Athletes. The objectives of the UGA were to maintain athletic activity (albeit substandard) and to support athletes in difficulty due to illness or hunger. Maropoulos continued his career after the war, playing until the early 1950s. Maropoulos last played for AEK in 1952, having spent 18 years of active service at the club. He may have continued for a while, but he fell seriously ill and was bedridden for many months. Overall, he played in 144 official matches and scored a total of 89 goals.

== International career ==
Maropoulos was capped 10 times international with Greece, including 6 as captain, from 1938 to 1950, with which he scored 1 goal. He made his debut on 22 January 1938 in a 3–1 victory over Palestine in Tel Aviv in the 1938 World Cup qualifiers. His only goal came in the largest victory of the team with 8–0 over Syria in a friendly match on 25 November 1949. His last international match was on 17 February 1950, in Cairo against Egypt, for the Mediterranean Cup.

== After football ==
After leaving the field, Maropoulos was for many years an agent of AEK and a selector for the Greece national team. He worked for AEK and HFF as a member of administration, all while being one of the pioneers of the movement for professional football in Greece. Maropoulos was also elected municipal councilor of Nea Ionia. He and his teammate, Tryfon Tzanetis had a strong friendship and they collaborated professionally, maintaining a joint sporting goods store in the center of Athens. The "Blonde Eagle" died on 3 January 1991, at the age of 72.

== Honours ==
AEK Athens

- Panhellenic Championship: 1938–39, 1939–40
- Greek Cup: 1938–39, 1948–49, 1949–50
- Athens FCA League: 1940, 1946, 1947, 1950

Individual

- Panhellenic Championship top scorer: 1939–40
- Panhellenic Championship qualifiers top scorer (South Group): 1938–39, 1939–40

== See also ==
- List of one-club men in association football
