= 1938–39 Panhellenic Championship =

10th season of top-tier football league in Greece

Panhellenic Championship
- Season: 1938–39
- Champions: AEK Athens; 1st Greek title
- Relegated: none
- Matches: 2
- Goals: 10 (5 per match)
- Top goalscorer: Kostas Vasiliou (3 goals)
- Biggest home win: AEK Athens 3–1 Iraklis
- Biggest away win: Iraklis 2–4 AEK Athens
- Highest scoring: Iraklis 2–4 AEK Athens
- Longest winning run: AEK Athens (2 matches)
- Longest unbeaten run: AEK Athens (2 matches)
- Longest winless run: Iraklis (2 matches)
- Longest losing run: Iraklis (2 matches)
- Highest attendance: 7,000
- Lowest attendance: 4,000

The 1938–39 Panhellenic Championship was the tenth season of the highest football league of Greece. 14 teams participated, for the first time so many and for the first time from the province. It was held in two groups, South Group with 8 and North Group with 6 teams, which qualified from the championships of the local associations.

The South Group comprised club of Athens' and Piraeus' associations and resulted as follows:

- Athenian Championship: The first 5 teams of the ranking.
- Piraeus' Championship: The first 3 teams of the ranking.

The North Group consisted of clubs from Macedonian and East Macedonian associations and resulted as follows:

- Macedonian Championship: The first 3 teams of the ranking.
- East Macedonian Championship: The first 3 teams of the ranking.

It was the first time that teams outside Central Greece and Thessaloniki participated in the national championship. The champions of the two groups, AEK Athens (due to a better goal ratio than Olympiacos) and Iraklis, competed in a 2-legged final for the title of champion. AEK Athens won the championship, who were qualified for the national championship as the runner-up of Αthenian championship, with their then rising star, Kleanthis Maropoulos.

Since 26 matchdays were required to complete the championship, it was decided that the clubs from the same region that were qualified for the national championship would not face each other again, but the results from their local championships would apply instead. From this period, the HFF established a point system of 3-2-1 in all competitions, so that there was the ability of zeroing any team that refused to take part in a match. That system would eventually be applied until the 1972–73 season.

== Qualification round ==
=== Athens Football Clubs Association ===
Pos	Team	Pld	W	D	L	GF	GA	GD	Pts	Qualification	PAO	AEK	APOL	AST	ATR	DAF
1	Panathinaikos (Q)	10	8	1	1	40	8	+32	27	South Group		0–2	4–1	6–2	7–0	2–1
2	AEK Athens (Q)	10	7	1	2	31	13	+18	25	South Group	2–2		1–2	3–1	8–3	2–0
3	Apollon Athens (Q)	10	6	1	3	28	16	+12	23	South Group	0–3	3–2		0–0	4–0	8–1
4	Asteras Athens (Q)	10	4	2	4	18	18	0	20	South Group	0–1	1–4	3–2		2–0	6–0
5	Atromitos (Q)	10	1	1	8	10	47	−37	13	South Group	0–10	1–6	1–5	1–2		2–1
6	Daphni Metaxourgeio	10	0	2	8	7	32	−25	12		0–5	0–1	1–3	1–1	2–2	

Source: rsssf
(Q) Qualified for the phase indicated

=== Piraeus Football Clubs Association ===
Pos	Team	Pld	W	D	L	GF	GA	GD	Pts	Qualification	ETH	OLY	ARIS	THE
1	Ethnikos Piraeus (Q)	6	5	1	0	22	6	+16	17	South Group		4–2	3–2	6–0
2	Olympiacos (Q)	6	4	1	1	26	9	+17	15	South Group	2–2		5–2	6–0
3	Aris Piraeus (Q)	6	2	0	4	9	17	−8	10	South Group	1–4	0–3		2–1
4	Thiseas Piraeus	6	0	0	6	3	28	−25	6		1–7	0–4	1–2	

Source: rsssf
(Q) Qualified for the phase indicated

=== Macedonia Football Clubs Association ===
Pos	Team	Pld	GF	GA	GD	Pts	Qualification
1	Iraklis (Q)	10	28	10	+18	27	North Group
2	Aris (Q)	10	35	10	+25	26	North Group
3	PAOK (Q)	10	28	13	+15	23	North Group
4	Makedonikos	10	16	18	-2	18	
5	MENT	10	16	28	-12	16	
6	Aetos Papafi	10	8	52	-44	10	

== Semi-final round ==
=== South Group ===
Pos	Team	Pld	W	D	L	GF	GA	GR	Pts	Qualification	AEK	OLY	ETH	PAO	APOL	AST	ARIS	ATR
1	AEK Athens (Q)	14	10	1	3	54	22	2.455	35	Finals		2–1	4–2	2–2 (Note: AFCA match.)	1–2	3–1	6–0	8–3
2	Olympiacos	14	10	1	3	38	17	2.235	35		5–1		2–2 (Note: PFCA match.)	2–1	2–3	1–0	5–2	3–0
3	Ethnikos Piraeus	14	8	2	4	31	23	1.348	32		1–3	4–2		1–0	1–2	3–1	3–2	4–1
4	Panathinaikos	14	8	2	4	40	16	2.500	32		0–2	0–3	2–2		4–1	6–2	2–1	7–0
5	Apollon Athens	14	8	1	5	35	23	1.522	31		3–2	0–3	1–2	0–3		0–0	3–0	4–0
6	Asteras Athens	14	6	1	7	21	26	0.808	27		1–4	1–3	2–0	0–1	3–2		2–1	2–0
7	Aris Piraeus	14	1	0	13	11	54	0.204	16		0–10	1–4	0–3	0–2	1–9	1–4		
8	Atromitos (Note: Atromitos has −2 points.)	14	1	0	13	10	58	0.172	14		1–6	0–2	1–3	0–10	1–5	1–2		

Source: rsssf
(Q) Qualified for the phase indicated

=== North Group ===
Pos	Team	Pld	W	D	L	GF	GA	GD	Pts	Qualification
1	Iraklis (Q)	10	8	1	1	22	7	+15	27	Finals
2	Aris	10	8	0	2	30	10	+20	26	
3	PAOK	10	5	0	5	30	21	+9	20	
4	AEK Kavala	10				11	18	-7	18	
5	Doxa Drama	10				10	26	-16	15	
6	Fillipoi Kavala	10				10	31	-21	14	

Home \ Away	IRA	ARIS	PAOK	AEK	DOX	FIL
Iraklis		3–2	2–0			4–0
Aris	0–1		2–0	2–0	4–2	7–1
PAOK	4–1	1–5		6–0		1–2
AEK Kavala		1–3	0–1			
Doxa Drama	0–2	0–4	2–1			
Fillipoi Kavala		1–2				

Source: rsssf
Legend: Blue = home team win; Yellow = draw; Red = away team win.

== Finals ==
Summary
Team 1	Agg.	Team 2	1st leg	2nd leg
AEK Athens	7–3	Iraklis	3–1	4–2

=== Matches ===
4 June 1939
16:30 EET

AEK Athens	3–1	Iraklis
Tzanetis 1'; Maropoulos 55'; Vasiliou 66'	Report	Frenelis 26'

Leoforos Alexandras Stadium, Ampelokipoi
Attendance: 4,000
Referee: Iliadis (Thessaloniki)
11 June 1939
17:15 EET

Iraklis	2–4	AEK Athens
Kitsos 13' (pen.); Frenelis 89'	Report	Maropoulos 26'; Vasiliou 45', 81'; Christodoulou 54'

Iraklis Stadium, Thessaloniki
Attendance: 7,000
Referee: Ch. Papadopoulos (Thessaloniki)

AEK Athens won 7–3 on aggregate.

== Top scorers ==
Rank	Player	Club	Goals
1	(Cyprus) Kostas Vasiliou	AEK Athens	3
2	(Greece) Kleanthis Maropoulos	AEK Athens	2
2	(Greece) Giannis Frenelis	Iraklis	2
4	(Greece) Tryfon Tzanetis	AEK Athens	1
4	(Greece) Nikos Kitsos	Iraklis	1
4	(Greece) Kostas Christodoulou	AEK Athens	1
