= 1939–40 Panhellenic Championship =

11th season of top-tier football league in Greece

Panhellenic Championship
- Season: 1939–40
- Champions: AEK Athens; 2nd Greek title
- Relegated: none
- Matches: 2
- Goals: 8 (4 per match)
- Top goalscorer: Kleanthis Maropoulos (2 goals)
- Biggest home win: AEK Athens 1–0 PAOK
- Biggest away win: PAOK 3–4 AEK Athens
- Highest scoring: PAOK 3–4 AEK Athens
- Longest winning run: AEK Athens (2 matches)
- Longest unbeaten run: AEK Athens (2 matches)
- Longest winless run: PAOK (2 matches)
- Longest losing run: PAOK (2 matches)
- Highest attendance: 3,000

The 1939–40 Panhellenic Championship was the 11th season of the highest football league of Greece and the last before the WW2 took place. It was carried out with a system similar to that of the previous season in which 14 teams participated again, 8 from the Central and 6 from North Greece, which were divided into groups. As of the previous season, since a total of 30 matchdays were required to complete the championship, the clubs from the same region that were qualified for the national championship did not face against each other again but the results from their local championships applied instead.

The teams of the Central Greece formed the South group and resulted as follows:

- Athenian Championship: The first 5 teams of the ranking.
- Piraeus' Championship: The first 3 teams of the ranking.

The teams of the Νorth Group were initially divided into two subgroups. The teams of the Thessaloniki formed the North subgroup A and resulted as follows:

- Macedonian Championship: The first 3 teams of the ranking.

The teams of Serres, East Macedonia and Thrace formed the North subgroup B and resulted as follows:

- Serres' Championship: The winner.
- Thracian Championship: The winner.
- East Macedonian Championship: The winner.

The two winners competed in double games to become the champion of the Northe group. The champions of South and North, AEK Athens and PAOK, competed in a 2-legged final for the title. AEK were crowned champions for second consecutive season, with Kleanthis Maropoulos being the protagonist as the last year. AEK had a great team then and throughout the year they had only one defeat in the South group against Olympiacos. In both local championship of Athens and the finals, AEK achieved only victories. The point system was: Win: 3 points - Draw: 2 points - Loss: 1 point.

== Qualification round ==
=== Athens Football Clubs Association ===
Pos	Team	Pld	W	D	L	GF	GA	GD	Pts	Qualification	AEK	PAO	APA	ATH	AST	PAG	ATR	DAF
1	AEK Athens (Q)	14	13	1	0	57	10	+47	41	South Group		1–0	3–2	3–0	4–1	4–0	1–1	3–2
2	Panathinaikos (Q)	14	9	2	3	50	15	+35	34	South Group	0–4		4–0	5–1	8–1	2–2	8–0	3–1
3	Apollon Athens (Q)	14	6	4	4	31	25	+6	30	South Group	0–3	2–0		1–1	5–3	2–2	4–1 (Note: Olympiacos Athens competed instead of Atromitos)	3–2
4	Athinaikos (Q)	14	6	3	5	21	25	−4	29	South Group	2–4	1–7	1–1		2–0	1–0	3–0	5–1
5	Asteras Athens (Q)	14	7	1	6	27	34	−7	29	South Group	0–4	1–3	3–1	0–0		2–1	5–2	3–2
6	Enosis Pangrati	14	5	4	5	22	25	−3	28		1–5	1–1	1–1	1–0	1–2		7–3	2–1
7	Atromitos (Note: At the beginning of the championship, Atromitos were deleted from the Athens' Federation and was replaced by the 3rd place holder of second tier, Olympiacos Athens. In fact, they played 3 games which resulted in 3 defeats. Eventually, the Athens' Federation took back the deletion of Atromitos and reinstated him in the championship, so the games of Olympiacos Athens were counted to Atromitos and the club took part in the second tier of the Athenian championship.)	14	1	2	11	13	62	−49	18		0–13	0–5	0–7	2–3	0–2	1–2		1–0
8	Daphni Metaxourgeio	14	0	1	13	14	39	−25	15		1–5	0–4	1–2	0–1	1–4	0–1	2–2	

Source: rsssf
(Q) Qualified for the phase indicated

=== Piraeus Football Clubs Association ===
Pos	Team	Pld	GF	GA	GD	Pts	Qualification
1	Olympiacos (Q)	10	49	10	+39	28	South Group
2	Ethnikos Piraeus (Q)	10	21	8	+13	26	South Group
3	Proodeftiki (Q)	10	23	19	+4	23	South Group
4	Thiseas Piraeus^{[a]}	10	8	18	-10	15	
5	Argonaftis Piraeus^{[b]}	10	12	26	-14	14	
6	Aris Piraeus^{[b]}	10	9	29	-20	13	

a. The ranking and the points are the final but the reported goal difference is of the 7th matchday.
b. The ranking and the points are the final but the reported goal difference is of the penultimate (9th) matchday.

=== Macedonia Football Clubs Association ===
Pos	Team	Pld	W	D	L	GF	GA	GD	Pts	Qualification	IRA	PAOK	ARIS	MENT	MAK	APK
1	Iraklis (Q)	10	7	2	1	28	13	+15	26	North Group		1–1	3–2 (Note: The match was stopped in '86 due to the refusal of a player of Aris to leave the field after being sent off. The result in the rankings remained 3–2, with Aris being punished by a deduction of 1 point.)	3–0	0–2	6–2
2	PAOK (Q)	10	6	2	2	22	12	+10	24	North Group	0–0		2–4	3–1	2–1	3–1
3	Aris (Note: 1 point must have been deducted from Aris' team due to the suspension of the match with Iraklis.) (Q)	10	6	1	3	32	12	+20	22	North Group	1–2	3–1		0–1	2–2	8–1
4	MENT	10	4	0	6	13	26	−13	18		2–6	0–6	0–4		3–0	3–2
5	Makedonikos	10	3	1	6	13	15	−2	17		0–2	1–2	0–1	1–0		4–0
6	Apollon Kalamarias	10	1	0	9	13	43	−30	12		3–5	0–2	0–7	1–3	3–2	

Source: rsssf
(Q) Qualified for the phase indicated

== Semi-final round ==
=== South Group ===
Pos	Team	Pld	W	D	L	GF	GA	GD	Pts	Qualification	AEK	OLY	PAO	ETH	APA	ATH	AST	PRO
1	AEK Athens (Q)	14	13	0	1	48	13	+35	40	Finals		3–2	1–0 (Note: AFCA match.)	2–0	3–2	3–0	4–1	4–0
2	Olympiacos	14	9	2	3	32	19	+13	34		3–2		1–4	0–2 (Note: PFCA match.)	3–0	1–0	4–2	2–1
3	Panathinaikos	14	8	2	4	42	19	+23	32		0–4	1–1		1–1	4–0	5–1	8–1	5–1
4	Ethnikos Piraeus	14	8	2	4	24	16	+8	32		1–4	0–4	2–1		0–1	2–0	3–0	4–1
5	Apollon Athens	14	5	3	6	19	26	−7	27		0–3	1–1	2–0	1–3		1–1	5–3	3–1
6	Athinaikos	14	2	4	8	12	31	−19	22		2–4	0–3	1–7	0–0	1–1		2–0	3–2
7	Asteras Athens	14	3	1	10	17	40	−23	21		0–4	1–3	1–3	0–2	3–1	0–0		3–1
8	Proodeftiki	14	1	0	13	16	46	−30	16		2–7	2–4	2–3	1–4	0–1	2–1	0–2	

Source: rsssf
(Q) Qualified for the phase indicated

=== North Group ===
==== Subgroup A ====
Pos	Team	Pld	W	D	L	GF	GA	GD	Pts	Qualification	PAOK	ARIS	IRA
1	PAOK (A)	4	2	1	1	7	6	+1	9 (Note: Aris had a better goal difference and goal ratio but the 1st place was taken by PAOK, because of the better results in the games between them.)	North Group play-offs		2–1	4–1
2	Aris	4	2	1	1	9	7	+2	9		1–1		3–1
3	Iraklis	4	1	0	3	8	11	−3	6		3–0	3–4	

Source: rsssf
(A) Advance to a further round

==== Subgroup B ====
A group with the winners of the Serres, Eastern Macedonia and Thrace local championships.

Pos	Team	Pld	W	D	L	GF	GA	GD	Pts	Qualification	FIL	IRA	ASP
1	Fillipoi Kavala (A)	4	2	1	1	15	5	+10	9	North Group play-offs		9–0	
2	Iraklis Serres	4	2	0	2	5	14	−9	8		0–2		2–1
3	Aspida Xanthi	4	1	1	2	8	9	−1	7			2–3	

Source: rsssf
(A) Advance to a further round

==== North Group play-offs ====
Team 1	Agg.	Team 2	1st leg	2nd leg
PAOK	6–3	Fillipoi Kavala	5–0	1–3

== Finals ==
Summary
Team 1	Agg.	Team 2	1st leg	2nd leg
AEK Athens	5–3	PAOK	1–0	4–3

=== Matches ===
9 June 1940

AEK Athens	1–0	PAOK
Vasiliou 53' (pen.)	report (d. p. 662)

AEK Stadium, Nea Filadelfeia
Attendance: 3,000
Referee: Pasalaris
16 June 1940

PAOK	3–4	AEK Athens
Kalogiannis 17'; Feroutsos 20'; Ioannidis 70'	report (d. p. 634)	Maropoulos 38', 49'; Chatzistavridis 54'; Gasparis 59'

Syntrivani Stadium, Thessaloniki
Referee: V. Diamantopoulos

AEK Athens won 5–3 on aggregate.

== Top scorers ==
Rank	Player	Club	Goals
1	(Greece) Kleanthis Maropoulos	AEK Athens	2
2	(Cyprus) Kostas Vasiliou	AEK Athens	1
2	(Greece) Alekos Chatzistavridis	AEK Athens	1
2	(Greece) Giorgos Gasparis	AEK Athens	1
2	(Greece) Kostas Kalogiannis	PAOK	1
2	(Greece) Stefanos Feroutsos	PAOK	1
2	(Greece) Aristidis Ioannidis	PAOK	1
