= 1938–39 Greek Football Cup =

1938–39 Greek Cup
Tournament details
- Country: Greece
- Teams: 73

Final positions
- Champions: AEK Athens (2nd title)
- Runners-up: PAOK

Tournament statistics
- Matches played: 75
- Goals scored: 336 (4.48 per match)

The 1938–39 Greek Football Cup was the 3rd edition of the Greek Football Cup. 73 teams contested in 75 matches. Ethnikos Piraeus unsuccessfully defended its 1933 title losing in the Round of 16 to AEK Athens. AEK Athens would continue on its tournament streak until defeated in the finals, 2-1, on 28 May at Leoforos Alexandras Stadium against PAOK.

== Calendar ==
Round	Date(s)	Fixtures	Clubs	New entries
First Round	26 October 1938	27	73 → 47	65
Second Round		19	47 → 29	none
Third Round		9	29 → 20	none
Fourth Round		3	20 → 17	none
Fifth Round		1	17 → 16	none
Round of 16	19 February 1939	8	16 → 8	8
Quarter-finals	30 April 1939	4	8 → 4	none
Semi-finals	14 May 1939	2	4 → 2	none
Final	28 May 1939	1	2 → 1	none

== Qualification round ==
=== First round ===
Team 1	Score/Agg.	Team 2	Match	Replay
Athens Football Clubs Association
Arion Kolonaki	3–4	Apollon Nea Ionia		
Olympiacos Athens	1–2 (a.e.t.)	Attikos		
Athinaikos	5–1	Olympias Athens		
Panerythraikos	0–1	Mikrasiatiki Athens		
Atlas Thymarakia	5–3	AE Ierapoli		
AE Pangrati	6–2	Fostiras		
Dapfni Athens	bye			
Asteras Athens	bye			
Atromitos	bye			
Piraeus Football Clubs Association
Argonaftis Piraeus	4–1	AEK Piraeus		
Aris Piraeus	3–0	Amyna Piraeus		
Keramikos Kaminia	3–0	Atromitos Piraeus		
Panelefsiniakos	4–1	Faliriki Enosis		
Thiseas Piraeus	bye			
Proodeftiki	bye			
E.F. Neapoli	bye			
Macedonia Football Clubs Association
Olympiacos Terpsithea	2–1 (a.e.t.)	Apollon Thessaloniki		
MENT	5–0	Prosfygiki Enosis Thessaloniki		
Ethnikos Kamaras	0–1	Olympiacos Thessaloniki		
Hellas Florina	2–1	AE Kozani		
Thrace Football Clubs Association
AE Xanthi	5–7	AE Komotini	3–3 (a.e.t.)	2–5
Aspida Xanthi	bye			
Central-Eastern Macedonia Football Clubs Association
Apollon Serres	1–5	Orfeas Serres		
Elpis Drama	6–1	Aris Drama		
Iraklis Kavalas	1–0	Iraklis Serres		
Filipi Kavala	bye			
Doxa Drama	bye			
AEK Kavala	bye			
Thessaly Football Clubs Association
PAEK	1–2	Odysseus Volos		
Olympiacos Volos	5–1	Kentavros Volos		
Niki Volos	bye			
Keravnos Volos	bye			
Patras Football Clubs Association
Panachaiki	6–2	Aris Patra		
Panegialios	5–0	Achilleus Patra		
Panetolikos	4–3	Apollon Patras		
Olympiakos Patras	4–0	Ethnikos Patra		
Crete Football Clubs Association
Olympiacos Heraklion	5–1	Ergotelis		
OFI	1–2	Iraklis Heraklion		
EGOH	bye			

=== Second round ===
Team 1	Score/Agg.	Team 2	Match	Replay
Athens Football Clubs Association
Dapfni Athens	?	Atromitos		
Athinaikos	3–1	Apollon Nea Ionia		
Attikos	?	Atlas Thymarakia		
AE Pangrati	6–2	Mikrasiatiki Athens		
Asteras Athens	bye			
Piraeus Football Clubs Association
Thiseas Piraeus	3–6	Proodeftiki		
Panelefsiniakos	2–1	E.F. Neapoli		
Argonaftis Piraeus	2–6	Keramikos Kaminia		
Aris Piraeus	bye			
Macedonia Football Clubs Association
Olympiacos Terpsithea	3–1	Olympiacos Thessaloniki		
Hellas Florina	3–0	MENT		
Thrace Football Clubs Association
AE Komotini	?	Aspida Xanthi		
Central-Eastern Macedonia Football Clubs Association
Orfeas Serres	3–1	Iraklis Kavalas		
Filipi Kavala	7–1	Doxa Drama		
Elpis Drama	3–2	AEK Kavala	2–2 (a.e.t.)	1–0
Thessaly Football Clubs Association
Niki Volos	3–1	Keravnos Volos		
Olympiacos Volos	3–0	Odysseus Volos		
Patras Football Clubs Association
Panetolikos	1–0	Panegialios		
Panachaiki	1–2 (a.e.t.)	Olympiakos Patras		
Crete Football Clubs Association
Iraklis Heraklion	?	?		
?	bye			

=== Third round ===
Team 1	Score/Agg.	Team 2	Match	Replay
Athens Football Clubs Association
Dapfni Athens	1–3	AE Pangrati		
Athinaikos	4–7	Atlas Thymarakia		
Asteras Athens	bye			
Piraeus Football Clubs Association
Aris Piraeus	4–2	Panelefsiniakos	2–2 (a.e.t.)	2–0
Proodeftiki	3–4	Keramikos Kaminia		
Macedonia Football Clubs Association
Hellas Florina	5–3	Olympiacos Terpsithea		
Thrace/Central-Eastern Macedonia Football Clubs Association
Orfeas Serres	0–3	Filipi Kavala		
Aspida Xanthi	bye			
Elpis Drama	bye			
Thessaly Football Clubs Association
Niki Volos	4–1	Olympiacos Volos		
Patras Football Clubs Association
Olympiakos Patras	3–2	Panetolikos		
Crete Football Clubs Association
EGOH	2–1	Olympiacos Heraklion		

=== Fourth round ===
Team 1	Score	Team 2
Athens Football Clubs Association
Asteras Athens	5–1 (a.e.t.)	AE Pangrati
Atlas Thymarakia	bye	
Piraeus Football Clubs Association
Aris Piraeus	1–0	Keramikos Kaminia
Thrace/Central-Eastern Macedonia Football Clubs Association
Filipi Kavala	2–3	Aspida Xanthi
Elpis Drama	bye	

=== Fifth round ===
Team 1	Score	Team 2
Athens Football Clubs Association
Asteras Athens	2–1	Atlas Thymarakia

== Knockout phase ==
In the knockout phase, teams play against each other over a single match. If the match ends up as a draw, extra time will be played and if the match remains a draw a replay match is set at the home of the guest team which the extra time rule stands as well. That procedure will be repeated until a winner occurs.
The mechanism of the draws for each round is as follows:

- In the draw for the round of 16, the eight top teams of each association are seeded and the eight clubs that passed the qualification round are unseeded.
  The seeded teams are drawn against the unseeded teams.
- In the draws for the quarter-finals onwards, there are no seedings, and teams from the same group can be drawn against each other.

== Bracket ==
Round of 16
Olympiacos	13
Ethnikos Heraklion	0
Panathinaikos	4
Elpida Drama	1
Olympiacos Patra	1
Apollon Athens	5
AEK Athens	7
Aris Piraeus	0
Hellas Florina	1
PAOK	6
Aspida Xanthi	1
Iraklis	2
Niki Volos	1
Ethnikos Piraeus (a.e.t.)	2
Aris	8
Asteras Athens	1

Quarter-finals
Olympiacos (a.e.t.)	2
Panathinaikos	0
Apollon Athens	1
AEK Athens	3
PAOK	3
Iraklis	2
Ethnikos Piraeus	2
Aris	0

Semi-finals
Olympiacos	0
AEK Athens (w/o)	2
PAOK	4
Ethnikos Piraeus	0

Final
AEK Athens	2
PAOK	1

== Round of 16 ==
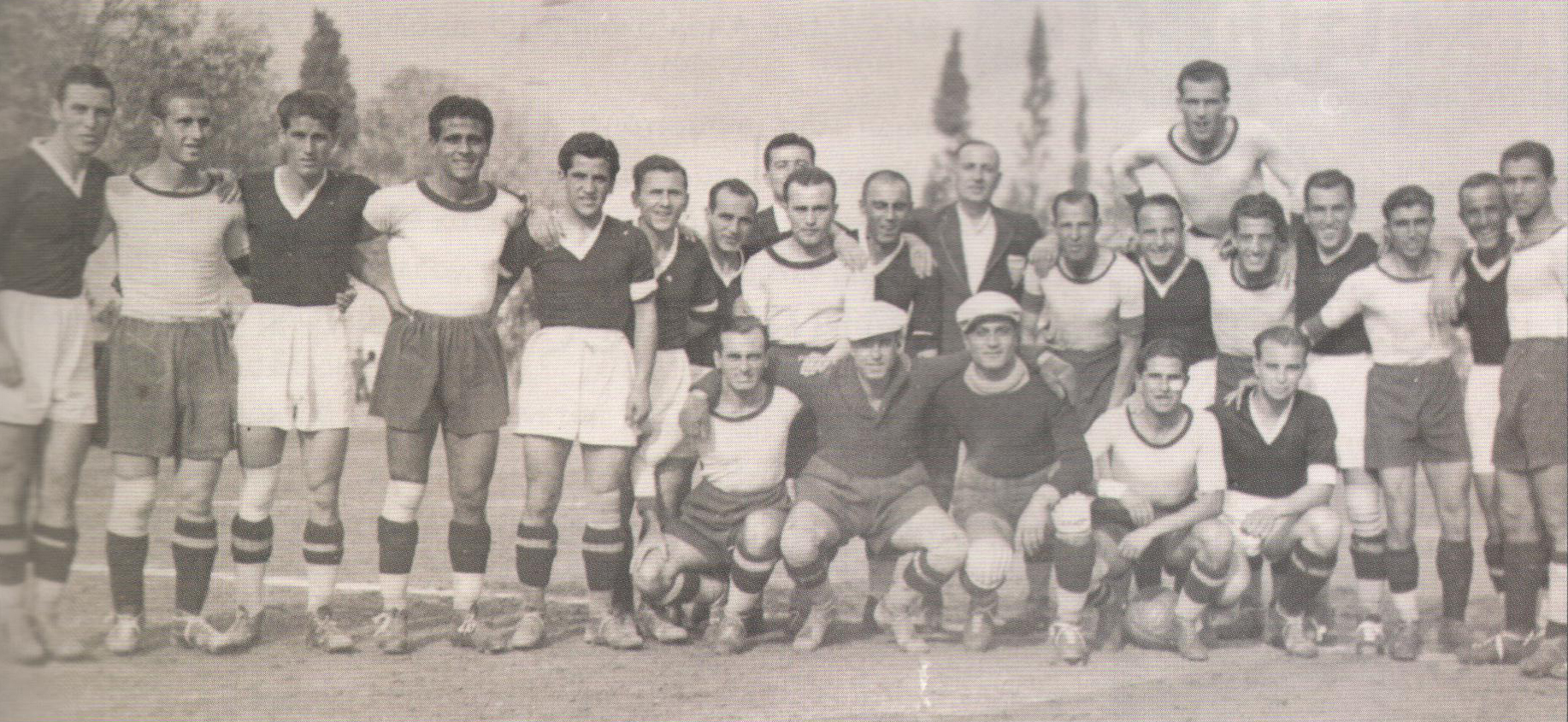
Players of AEK Athens and PAOK before the final

Team 1	Score	Team 2
AEK Athens	7–0	Aris Piraeus
Niki Volos	1–2 (a.e.t.)	Ethnikos Piraeus
Hellas Florina	1–6	PAOK
Olympiacos	13–0	Ethnikos Heraklion
Aris	8–1	Asteras Athens
Aspida Xanthi	1–2	Iraklis
Olympiacos Patra	1–5	Apollon Athens
Panathinaikos	4–1	Elpida Drama

== Quarter-finals ==
Team 1	Score	Team 2
PAOK	3–2	Iraklis
Olympiacos	2–0 (a.e.t.)	Panathinaikos
Ethnikos Piraeus	2–0	Aris
Apollon Athens	1–3	AEK Athens

== Semi-finals ==
Team 1	Score	Team 2
PAOK	4–0	Ethnikos Piraeus
Olympiacos	0–2 (w/o)^{*}	AEK Athens

^{*}Match suspended at 40th minute while the score was 1–2. Awarded 0–2 to AEK Athens.

== Final ==
28 May 1939
17:00 EET

AEK Athens	2–1	PAOK
Chatzistavridis 41'; Manettas 73'	Report	Ioannidis 33'

Leoforos Alexandras Stadium, Athens
Referee: Stavros Chatzopoulos
