= List of AEK Athens F.C. seasons =

Greek association football club

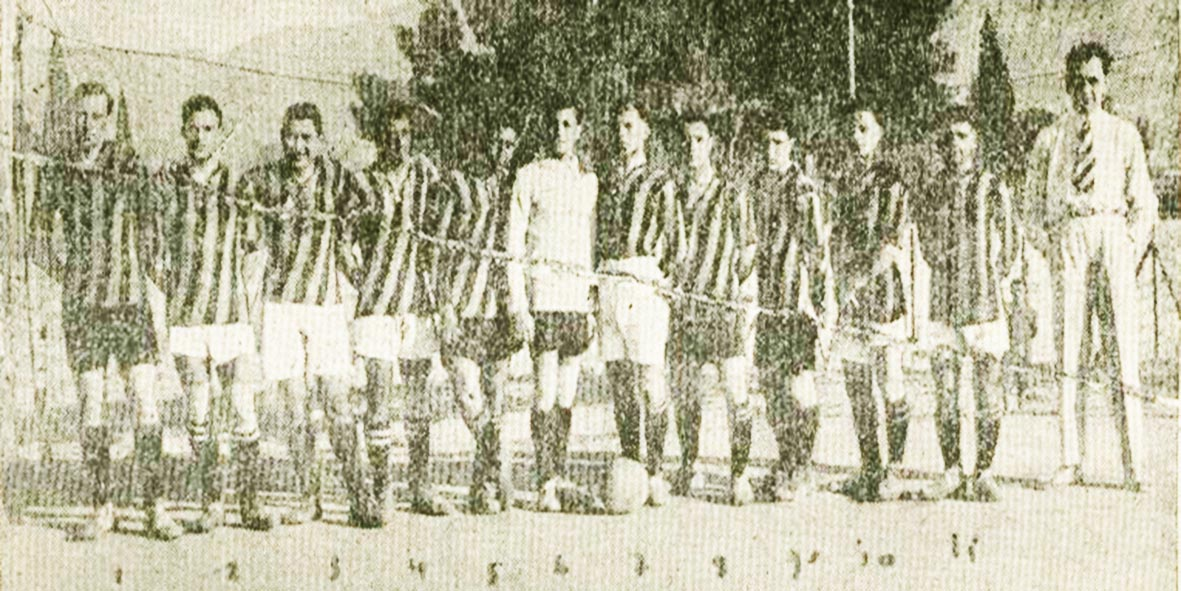
AEK Athens' squad in 1924.

AEK Athens Football Club (Greek: ΠΑΕ ΑΕΚ), also known simply as AEK, AEK Athens (in European competitions), or with their full name Athlitiki Enosis Konstantinoupoleos (Greek: Αθλητική Ένωσις Κωνσταντινουπόλεως, Athletic Union of Constantinople), are a Greek association football club based in Nea Filadelfeia suburb of Athens.

The club has amassed various records since their founding. Regionally, domestically and continentally, the club has set several records in winning various official and unofficial competitions. Established in Athens in 1924 by Greek refugees from Constantinople in the wake of the Greco-Turkish War, A.E.K. are one of the most successful clubs in Greek football, winning 35 national titles (including 14 Championships, 16 Cups, 1 League Cup and 3 Super Cups). The team has appeared several times in European (UEFA Champions League and UEFA Europa League) competitions. AEK are a member of the European Club Association.

The club was relegated from the Greek Super League after the 2012–13 season for the first time in their history. In an effort to discharge the immense debt created by years of mismanagement, their directors chose for the team to compete in the third tier Football League 2 for the 2013–14 season, thus turning the club into an amateur club. After 2 seasons on the lower divisions the club completed their comeback to the first division.

== Key ==
- UCL – UEFA Champions League
- CWC – UEFA Cup Winners' Cup
- ICFC – Inter-Cities Fairs Cup
- UEL – UEFA Europa League
- BC – Balkans Cup
- UECL – UEFA Conference League
- PR – Preliminary round
- QR1 – First qualifying round
- QR2 – Second qualifying round
- QR3 – Third qualifying round
- PO – Play-off round
- R1 – First round
- R2 – Second round
- R3 – Third round
- R4 – Fourth round
- R5 – Fifth round
- R6 – Sixth round
- R7 – Seventh round
- Grp – Group Stage
- LP – League Phase
- R32 – Round of 32
- R16 – Round of 16
- QF – Quarter-finals
- SF – Semi-finals
- RU – Runners-up
- W – Winners

Champions	Runners-up	3rd place	Division winners	Relegated

== Seasons ==
Season	Domestic competitions						International competitions					Top scorer	
Season	League	Play-offs	Cup	Super Cup	League Cup	AFCA	UCL	CWC	ICFC / UEL	UECL	Balkans Cup	Player(s)	Goals
1924–25	Did not exist	Did not exist	Did not exist	Did not exist	Did not exist	RU	Did not exist	Did not exist	Did not exist	Did not exist	Did not exist		
1925–26	Did not exist	Did not exist	Did not exist	Did not exist	Did not exist	3rd	Did not exist	Did not exist	Did not exist	Did not exist	Did not exist		
1926–27	Did not exist	Did not exist	Did not exist	Did not exist	Did not exist	RU	Did not exist	Did not exist	Did not exist	Did not exist	Did not exist	Kostas Negrepontis	10
1927–28	Withdrew	Did not exist	Did not exist	Did not exist	Did not exist	Withdrew	Did not exist	Did not exist	Did not exist	Did not exist	Did not exist	—	
1928–29	Not held	Did not exist	Did not exist	Did not exist	Did not exist	RU	Did not exist	Did not exist	Did not exist	Did not exist	Did not exist	Kostas Negrepontis	6
1929–30	Did not qualify	Did not exist	Did not exist	Did not exist	Did not exist	RU	Did not exist	Did not exist	Did not exist	Did not exist	Did not exist	Dimitris Mougras	10
1930–31	4th	Did not exist	Did not exist	Did not exist	Did not exist	RU	Did not exist	Did not exist	Did not exist	Did not exist	Did not exist	Dimitris Mougras	11+
1931–32	8th	Did not exist	W	Did not exist	Did not exist	Not eligible	Did not exist	Did not exist	Did not exist	Did not exist	Did not exist	Ilias Iliaskos	7
1932–33	3rd	Did not exist	R2	Did not exist	Did not exist	Not eligible	Did not exist	Did not exist	Did not exist	Did not exist	Did not exist	Dimitris Mougras	7
1933–34	6th (Note: South Group)	Did not exist	Not held	Did not exist	Did not exist	3rd	Did not exist	Did not exist	Did not exist	Did not exist	Did not exist	Sotiris Tziralidis	4
1934–35	Not held	Did not exist	Not held	Did not exist	Did not exist	Not finished	Did not exist	Did not exist	Did not exist	Did not exist	Did not exist		
1935–36	5th	Did not exist	Not held	Did not exist	Did not exist	Not eligible	Did not exist	Did not exist	Did not exist	Did not exist	Did not exist		
1936–37	Did not qualify	Did not exist	Not held	Did not exist	Did not exist	RU	Did not exist	Did not exist	Did not exist	Did not exist	Did not exist		
1937–38	Did not qualify	Did not exist	Not held	Did not exist	Did not exist	RU	Did not exist	Did not exist	Did not exist	Did not exist	Did not exist		
1938–39	W	Did not exist	W	Did not exist	Did not exist	RU	Did not exist	Did not exist	Did not exist	Did not exist	Did not exist	Kleanthis Maropoulos	24+
1939–40	W	Did not exist	SF	Did not exist	Did not exist	W	Did not exist	Did not exist	Did not exist	Did not exist	Did not exist	Kleanthis Maropoulos	25
1940–41	Not held	Did not exist	Not finished	Did not exist	Did not exist	Not finished	Did not exist	Did not exist	Did not exist	Did not exist	Did not exist		
1941–42	Not held	Did not exist	Not held	Did not exist	Did not exist	Not held	Did not exist	Did not exist	Did not exist	Did not exist	Did not exist	—	
1942–43	Not finished	Did not exist	Not held	Did not exist	Did not exist	Not held	Did not exist	Did not exist	Did not exist	Did not exist	Did not exist	—	
1943–44	Not held	Did not exist	Not held	Did not exist	Did not exist	Not held	Did not exist	Did not exist	Did not exist	Did not exist	Did not exist	—	
1944–45	Not held	Did not exist	Not held	Did not exist	Did not exist	Not finished	Did not exist	Did not exist	Did not exist	Did not exist	Did not exist	—	
1945–46	RU	Did not exist	Not held	Did not exist	Did not exist	W	Did not exist	Did not exist	Did not exist	Did not exist	Did not exist	Kleanthis Maropoulos; Tryfon Tzanetis	12
1946–47	4th	Did not exist	R16	Did not exist	Did not exist	W	Did not exist	Did not exist	Did not exist	Did not exist	Did not exist	Xenofon Markopoulos; Kleanthis Maropoulos	9
1947–48	Did not qualify	Did not exist	RU	Did not exist	Did not exist	3rd	Did not exist	Did not exist	Did not exist	Did not exist	Did not exist	Kleanthis Maropoulos	11
1948–49	Did not qualify	Did not exist	W	Did not exist	Did not exist	5th	Did not exist	Did not exist	Did not exist	Did not exist	Did not exist	Xenofon Markopoulos	15
1949–50	Not finished	Did not exist	W	Did not exist	Did not exist	W	Did not exist	Did not exist	Did not exist	Did not exist	Did not exist	Manolis Kountouris	14
1950–51	Did not qualify	Did not exist	QF	Did not exist	Did not exist	RU	Did not exist	Did not exist	Did not exist	Did not exist	Did not exist	Manolis Kountouris	5
1951–52	Not held	Did not exist	SF	Did not exist	Did not exist	RU	Did not exist	Did not exist	Did not exist	Did not exist	Did not exist	Ilias Papageorgiou	13
1952–53	Did not qualify	Did not exist	RU	Did not exist	Did not exist	3rd	Did not exist	Did not exist	Did not exist	Did not exist	Did not exist	Lambis Serafidis	8
1953–54	3rd	Did not exist	R16	Did not exist	Did not exist	RU	Did not exist	Did not exist	Did not exist	Did not exist	Did not exist	Panagiotis Patakas; Andreas Stamatiadis	7
1954–55	Did not qualify	Did not exist	R16	Did not exist	Did not exist	3rd	Did not exist	Did not exist	Did not exist	Did not exist	Did not exist	Giannis Kanakis	7
1955–56	Did not qualify	Did not exist	W	Did not exist	Did not exist	5th	Not eligible	Did not exist	Not eligible	Did not exist	Did not exist	Giannis Chaniotis	8
1956–57	Did not qualify	Did not exist	QF	Did not exist	Did not exist	4th	Not eligible	Did not exist	Not eligible	Did not exist	Did not exist	Giannis Kanakis	12
1957–58	RU	Did not exist	QF	Did not exist	Did not exist	RU	Not eligible	Did not exist	Not eligible	Did not exist	Did not exist	Kostas Nestoridis	22
1958–59	RU	Did not exist	QF	Did not exist	Did not exist	3rd	Not eligible	Did not exist	Not eligible	Did not exist	Did not exist	Kostas Nestoridis	26
1959–60	RU	Did not exist	R7	Did not exist	Did not exist	Not eligible	Not eligible	Did not exist	Not eligible	Did not exist	Did not exist	Kostas Nestoridis	42
1960–61	4th	Did not exist	QF	Did not exist	Did not exist	Not eligible	Not eligible	Not eligible	Not eligible	Did not exist	5th	Kostas Nestoridis	44
1961–62	4th	Did not exist	R16	Did not exist	Did not exist	Not eligible	Not eligible	Not eligible	Not eligible	Did not exist	Not eligible	Kostas Nestoridis	29
1962–63	W	Did not exist	QF	Did not exist	Did not exist	Not eligible	Not eligible	Not eligible	Not eligible	Did not exist	Not eligible	Kostas Nestoridis	28
1963–64	3rd	Did not exist	W	Did not exist	Did not exist	Not eligible	PR	Not eligible	Not eligible	Did not exist	Not eligible	Mimis Papaioannou	34
1964–65	RU	Did not exist	QF	Did not exist	Did not exist	Not eligible	Not eligible	R1	Not eligible	Did not exist	Not eligible	Kostas Nestoridis; Kostas Papageorgiou	20
1965–66	3rd	Did not exist	W	Did not exist	Did not exist	Not eligible	Not eligible	Not eligible	Not eligible	Did not exist	Not eligible	Mimis Papaioannou	29
1966–67	RU	Did not exist	QF	Did not exist	Did not exist	Not eligible	Not eligible	R1	Not eligible	Did not exist	RU	Mimis Papaioannou	22
1967–68	W	Did not exist	SF	Did not exist	Did not exist	Not eligible	Not eligible	Not eligible	Not eligible	Did not exist	Grp	Mimis Papaioannou	21
1968–69	6th	Did not exist	R16	Did not exist	Did not exist	Not eligible	QF	Not eligible	Not eligible	Did not exist	Not eligible	Mimis Papaioannou	27
1969–70	RU	Did not exist	R2	Did not exist	Did not exist	Not eligible	Not eligible	Not eligible	Not eligible	Did not exist	Not eligible	Mimis Papaioannou	19
1970–71	W	Did not exist	SF	Did not exist	Did not exist	Not eligible	Not eligible	Not eligible	R1	Did not exist	Not eligible	Mimis Papaioannou	37
1971–72	3rd	Did not exist	R16	Did not exist	Did not exist	Not eligible	R1	Not eligible	Not eligible	Did not exist	Not eligible	Mimis Papaioannou	17
1972–73	5th	Did not exist	R16	Did not exist	Did not exist	Not eligible	Not eligible	Not eligible	R2	Did not exist	Not eligible	Kostas Nikolaidis	13
1973–74	5th	Did not exist	R16	Did not exist	Did not exist	Not eligible	Not eligible	Not eligible	Not eligible	Did not exist	Not eligible	Tasos Konstantinou	14
1974–75	RU	Did not exist	QF	Did not exist	Did not exist	Not eligible	Not eligible	Not eligible	Not eligible	Did not exist	Not eligible	Walter Wagner	20
1975–76	RU	Did not exist	SF	Did not exist	Did not exist	Not eligible	Not eligible	Not eligible	R2	Did not exist	Not eligible	Georgios Dedes	19
1976–77	4th	Did not exist	R16	Did not exist	Did not exist	Not eligible	Not eligible	Not eligible	SF	Did not exist	Not eligible	Thomas Mavros	21
1977–78	W	Did not exist	W	Did not exist	Did not exist	Not eligible	Not eligible	Not eligible	R2	Did not exist	Not eligible	Thomas Mavros	31
1978–79	W	Did not exist	RU	Did not exist	Did not exist	Not eligible	R2	Not eligible	Not eligible	Did not exist	Not held	Thomas Mavros	40
1979–80	4th	Did not exist	R16	Did not exist	Did not exist	Not eligible	R1	Not eligible	Not eligible	Did not exist	Not eligible	Dušan Bajević	27
1980–81	RU	Did not exist	SF	Did not exist	Did not exist	Not eligible	Not eligible	Not eligible	Not eligible	Did not exist	Grp	Dušan Bajević	15
1981–82	4th	Did not exist	R16	Did not exist	Did not exist	Not eligible	Not eligible	Not eligible	Not eligible	Did not exist	Not eligible	Thomas Mavros	19
1982–83	3rd	Did not exist	W	Did not exist	Did not exist	Not eligible	Not eligible	Not eligible	R1	Did not exist	Not eligible	Thomas Mavros	31
1983–84	7th	Did not exist	R16	Did not exist	Did not exist	Not eligible	Not eligible	R1	Not eligible	Did not exist	Not eligible	Thomas Mavros	17
1984–85	3rd	Did not exist	R1	Did not exist	Did not exist	Not eligible	Not eligible	Not eligible	Not eligible	Did not exist	Not eligible	Thomas Mavros	27
1985–86	3rd	Did not exist	SF	Did not exist	Did not exist	Not eligible	Not eligible	Not eligible	R1	Did not exist	Not eligible	Márton Esterházy	17
1986–87	7th	Did not exist	AR	Did not exist	Did not exist	Not eligible	Not eligible	Not eligible	R1	Did not exist	Not eligible	Jim Patikas	5
1987–88	RU	Did not exist	R16	Not eligible	Did not exist	Not eligible	Not eligible	Not eligible	Not eligible	Did not exist	Not eligible	Henrik Nielsen	23
1988–89	W	Did not exist	R32	Not eligible	Did not exist	Not eligible	Not eligible	Not eligible	R1	Did not exist	Not eligible	Mirosław Okoński	11
1989–90	RU	Did not exist	R32	W	W	Not eligible	R2	Not eligible	Not eligible	Did not exist	Not eligible	Daniel Batista	17
1990–91	3rd	Did not exist	R16	Not held	Not held	Not eligible	Not eligible	Not eligible	Not eligible	Did not exist	Not eligible	Daniel Batista	14
1991–92	W	Did not exist	SF	Not held	Not held	Not eligible	Not eligible	Not eligible	R3	Did not exist	Not eligible	Vasilis Dimitriadis	31
1992–93	W	Did not exist	SF	RU	Not held	Not eligible	R2	Not eligible	Not eligible	Did not exist	Not eligible	Vasilis Dimitriadis	44
1993–94	W	Did not exist	RU	RU	Not held	Not eligible	R1	Not eligible	Not eligible	Did not exist	Not eligible	Alexis Alexandris	30
1994–95	5th	Did not exist	RU	RU	Not held	Not eligible	Grp	Not eligible	Not eligible	Did not exist	Not eligible	Dimitris Saravakos	26
1995–96	RU	Did not exist	W	Not held	Not held	Not eligible	Not eligible	R2	Not eligible	Did not exist	Not held	Vasilios Tsiartas	32
1996–97	RU	Did not exist	W	W	Not held	Not eligible	Not eligible	QF	Not eligible	Did not exist	Not held	Christos Kostis	24
1997–98	3rd	Did not exist	R32	Not held	Not held	Not eligible	Not eligible	QF	Not eligible	Did not exist	Not held	Demis Nikolaidis	21
1998–99	RU	Did not exist	R1	Not held	Not held	Not eligible	Not eligible	Not eligible	R1	Did not exist	Not held	Demis Nikolaidis	28
1999–2000	3rd	Did not exist	W	Not held	Not held	Not eligible	QR3	Not held	R3	Did not exist	Not held	Demis Nikolaidis	36
2000–01	3rd	Did not exist	R16	Not held	Not held	Not eligible	Not eligible	Not held	R4	Did not exist	Not held	Demis Nikolaidis	25
2001–02	RU	Did not exist	W	Not held	Not held	Not eligible	Not eligible	Not held	R4	Did not exist	Not held	Demis Nikolaidis	28
2002–03	3rd	Did not exist	SF	Not held	Not held	Not eligible	Grp	Not held	R4	Did not exist	Not held	Demis Nikolaidis	16
2003–04	4th	Did not exist	SF	Not held	Not held	Not eligible	Grp	Not held	Not eligible	Did not exist	Not held	Nikos Liberopoulos	18
2004–05	3rd	Did not exist	SF	Not held	Not held	Not eligible	Not eligible	Not held	Grp	Did not exist	Not held	Alessandro Soares	15
2005–06	RU	Did not exist	RU	Not held	Not held	Not eligible	Not eligible	Not held	R1	Did not exist	Not held	Nikos Liberopoulos	16
2006–07	RU	Did not exist	R32	Not held	Not held	Not eligible	Grp	Not held	R32	Did not exist	Not held	Nikos Liberopoulos	20
2007–08	RU	RU	R16	Not eligible	Not held	Not eligible	QR3	Not held	R32	Did not exist	Not held	Ismael Blanco	21
2008–09	4th	RU	RU	Not held	Not held	Not eligible	Not eligible	Not held	QR2	Did not exist	Not held	Ismael Blanco	24
2009–10	4th	RU	R32	Not held	Not held	Not eligible	Not eligible	Not held	Grp	Did not exist	Not held	Ismael Blanco	13
2010–11	3rd	3rd	W	Not held	Not held	Not eligible	Not eligible	Not held	Grp	Did not exist	Not held	Ismael Blanco	15
2011–12	5th	RU	R16	Not held	Not held	Not eligible	Not eligible	Not held	Grp	Did not exist	Not held	Leonardo	13
2012–13	15th	Not eligible	R32	Not held	Not held	Not eligible	Not eligible	Not held	Not eligible	Did not exist	Not held	Taxiarchis Fountas	4
2013–14	1st (Note: Football League 2 (Group 6).)	Not eligible	QF (Note: Football League 2 Cup.)	Not held	Not held	Not eligible	Not eligible	Not held	Not eligible	Did not exist	Not held	Alexandre D'Acol	21
2014–15	1st (Note: Football League (South Group).)	1st (Note: Football League.)	QF	Not held	Not held	Not eligible	Not eligible	Not held	Not eligible	Did not exist	Not held	Christos Aravidis	20
2015–16	3rd	3rd	W	Not held	Not held	Not eligible	Not eligible	Not held	Not eligible	Did not exist	Not held	Ronald Vargas; Diego Buonanotte; Christos Aravidis	11
2016–17	4th	W	RU	Not held	Not held	Not eligible	Not eligible	Not held	QR3	Did not exist	Not held	Tomas Pekhart	12
2017–18	W	Not held	RU	Not held	Not held	Not eligible	QR3	Not held	R32	Did not exist	Not held	Lazaros Christodoulopoulos	16
2018–19	3rd	Not held	RU	Not held	Not held	Not eligible	Grp	Not held	Not eligible	Did not exist	Not held	Ezequiel Ponce	21
2019–20	3rd	3rd	RU	Not held	Not held	Not eligible	Not eligible	Not held	PO	Did not exist	Not held	Nélson Oliveira	16
2020–21	3rd	4th	SF	Not held	Not held	Not eligible	Not eligible	Not held	Grp	Did not exist	Not held	Karim Ansarifard	14
2021–22	3rd	5th	QF	Not held	Not held	Not eligible	Not eligible	Not held	Not eligible	QR2	Not held	Sergio Araujo	12
2022–23	RU	W	W	Not held	Not held	Not eligible	Not eligible	Not held	Not eligible	Not eligible	Not held	Levi García	18
2023–24	RU	RU	R16	Not held	Not held	Not eligible	PO	Not held	Grp	Not eligible	Not held	Ezequiel Ponce	16
2024–25	RU	4th	SF	Not held	Not held	Not eligible	Not eligible	Not held	Not eligible	QR3	Not held	Levi García	10
2025–26	W	W	QF	Not eligible	Not held	Not eligible	Not eligible	Not held	Not eligible	QF	Not held	Luka Jović	21
2026–27	TBA	TBA	TBA	RU	Not held	Not eligible	LP	Not held	Not eligible	Not eligible	Not held		

== See also ==
- AEK Athens F.C.
- History of AEK Athens F.C.
- AEK Athens F.C. in European football
- List of AEK Athens F.C. records and statistics
