= Athenian derby =

Football rivalry in Greece

- Native name: Αθηναϊκό ντέρμπι (Greek)
- Other names: AEK–Panathinaikos derby
- Location: Athens, Greece
- Teams: AEK Athens; Panathinaikos
- First meeting: 6 January 1925; AFCA League; Panathinaikos 2–0 AEK Athens
- Latest meeting: 1 November 2026; Super League Greece; Panathinaikos 2–0 AEK Athens
- Next meeting: TBA
- Stadiums: Agia Sophia Stadium (AEK Athens); Athens Olympic Stadium (Panathinaikos)

Statistics
- Most wins: Panathinaikos (106)
- Top scorer: Vangelis Panakis (15)
- Largest victory: Panathinaikos 5–0 AEK Athens (29 April 1934)

The Athenian derby (Greek: Αθηναϊκό ντέρμπι) is the football local derby in the Athens urban area, Greece, between AEK Athens, based in Nea Filadelfeia, a suburban town in the urban area and Athens-based Panathinaikos.

== History ==
=== Early years ===
The matches between AEK Athens and Panathinaikos are considered the major derby of Athens and one of the most notable rivalries in Greece. Their rivalry dates back to the establishment of the AFCA League, where both clubs were among its main contenders. From the 1920s to the 1950s, AEK used Leoforos Alexandras Stadium as their home ground as well, hosting Panathinaikos as the home team on 17 occasions.

In the spring of 1942 during the Axis occupation of Greece, a friendly match between the two clubs was arranged at Leoforos Alexandras Stadium. The captains, Anastasios Kritikos and Kleanthis Maropoulos, requested that part of the match proceeds be allocated to footballers suffering from tuberculosis who were being treated at the "Sotiria" hospital. Following the refusal of then Panathinaikos president Apostolos Nikolaidis, and the announcement that a German-appointed Austrian officer would referee the match, the players decided not to take part. Both teams entered the pitch together and informed the spectators of the developments. The crowd, enraged, invaded the pitch, causing severe damages. The incidents escalated into an anti-fascist demonstration that reached Omonia Square, before being dispersed by Nazi forces.

=== Post-war period ===
During the 1960s, encounters between the two sides featured several prominent players of the era, including Kostas Nestoridis, Mimis Papaioannou and Kostas Nikolaidis for the "yellow-blacks" and Mimis Domazos, Vangelis Panakis and Andreas Papaemmanouil for the "greens". On 8 October 1960 at Leoforos Alexandras Stadium, the score was 2–2 shortly before the end. Andreou violently tackled Nestoridis. The referee did not award a foul, and amid protests from AEK players, Panakis scored to give Panathinaikos a 3–2 lead. Incidents followed, during which Mimis Anastasiadis was sent-off but refused to leave the pitch, leading to the referee abandoning the match. Panathinaikos were subsequently awarded a 2–0 victory by default. On 3 April 1966, in a league match at Nea Filadelfeia the match was at 1–1 and while there had been previous violent incidents between the players in the first half, Takis Loukanidis scored at the 88th minute for Panathinaikos from an offside position. The referee awarded the goal and wild incidents occurred with the participation of fans entering the pitch, which resulted in the match permanently stopped at the expense of AEK, who were penalized and the game was awarded to Panathinaikos. On 29 September 1963, one of the greatest games in Greek football took place, where Panathinaikos prevailed over AEK 5–4, even though they found themselves losing 0–2 and 1–3. On 19 December 1965, AEK won for the first time at Leoforos Alexandras Stadium in the Alpha Ethniki. Papaioannou, after the management of AEK refused to sell him to Real Madrid, resulting in his departure to become a singer, returned and scored a goal, while a brace by Nikolaidis shaped the final 2–3 for AEK. That match initiated a 6-year unbeaten streak for AEK at Leoforos Alexandras Stadium, which lasted until 23 June 1971.

Antonis Antoniadis delivered great performances for Panathinaikos by scoring a hat-trick on 17 December 1972 in a 3–1 win and a brace on 15 May 1977, which sealed the league title. Maik Galakos also scored three goals against AEK in September 1981 in his first season with the "greens", in the last match between the two teams before Panathinaikos moved the Olympic Stadium. For AEK Athens, Thomas Mavros scored a hat-trick on 3 April 1983 in a 4–1 at AEK Stadium. Οn 15 April 1984, the goalkeeper of AEK, Christos Arvanitis saved a penalty taken by Charalampidis, keeping the score at 0–0 and postponing league title celebration of Panathinaikos by a week.

=== Modern era ===
From 2001, after the return of Panathinaikos to Leoforos Alexandras Stadium, they achieved a remarkable 12-game unbeaten streak against AEK until 9 May 2021, when AEK won by 0–1 with a goal by Petros Mantalos. In the 2025–26 season Luka Jović made a historical performance becoming the first player of AEK to score a hat-trick at Leoforos Alexandras Stadium in a 2–3 win of the "yellow-blacks", while about fifty days later became the first player to score 4 goals in an Athenian derby, after the 4–0 win at Agia Sophia Stadium.

== Statistics ==
=== Honours ===
AEK Athens	Competition	Panathinaikos
Domestic
14	Super League Greece	20
16	Greek Cup	20
2	Greek Super Cup	3
1	Greek League Cup (defunct)	0
5	Athens FCA League (defunct)	17
European
0	Balkans Cup (defunct)	1
38	Total	61

=== Matches summary ===
Competition	Matches	Wins		Draws	Goals		Home wins		Home draws		Away wins		Other venue wins	
Competition	Matches	AEK	PAO	Draws	AEK	PAO	AEK	PAO	AEK	PAO	AEK	PAO	AEK	PAO
Super League Greece	178	51	71	56	167	205	36	40	22	33	15	29	0	2
Athens FCA League	60	12	24	13	50	73	7	13	6	5	5	11	–	–
Greek Cup	31	10	9	12	45	40	5	4	5	3	4	3	1	2
Greek Super Cup	4	0	2	2	2	6	–	–	–	–	–	–	0	2
Total	273	73	106	83	264	324	48	57	33	41	24	43	1	6

=== Head-to-head ranking in Super League Greece ===
P.	60	61	62	63	64	65	66	67	68	69	70	71	72	73	74	75	76	77	78	79	80	81	82	83	84	85	86	87	88	89	90	91	92	93	94	95	96	97	98	99	00	01	02	03	04	05	06	07	08	09	10	11	12	13	14	15	16	17	18	19	20	21	22	23	24	25	26
1	1	1	1	1	1	1			1	1	1	1	1					1	1	1					1		1			1	1	1	1	1	1	1	1								1						1								1					1			1
2	2			2		2	2	2			2				2	2	2					2	2			2		2	2		2			2	2		2	2	2	2	2	2	2	2		2	2	2	2	2		2	2		2	2		2						2	2	2	
3					3		3	3	3			3	3	3					3		3			3		3	3			3		3	3						3	3	3	3	3	3		3	3	3	3	3	3		3				3	3		3	3						
4		4	4														4	4			4		4																						4							4					4				4	4	4		4	4	4
5														5	5	5				5		5							5							5		5																								5	5				
6										6														6																														6													
7																									7			7																																							
8																																																												8							
9																																																																			
10																																																																			
11																																																											11								
12																																																																			
13																																																																			
14																																																																			
15																																																						15													
16																																																																			
17																																																																			
18																																																																			
Super League 2
1																																																								1											
Gamma Ethniki
1																																																							1												

- Total: Panathinaikos with 39 higher finishes, AEK Athens with 28 higher finishes.

== Matches list ==
=== Athens FCA League ===
Season	AEK Athens – Panathinaikos				Panathinaikos – AEK Athens			
Season	Date	Venue	Atten.	Score	Date	Venue	Atten.	Score
1924–25	06–01–1925	Leoforos Alexandras Stadium	N/A	0–2	08–03–1926	Leoforos Alexandras Stadium	N/A	1–0
1925–26	03–01–1926	Leoforos Alexandras Stadium	N/A	0–0	23–05–1926	Leoforos Alexandras Stadium	N/A	3–1
1926–27	23–01–1927	Leoforos Alexandras Stadium	N/A	2–2	06–03–1927	Leoforos Alexandras Stadium	N/A	1–1
1926–27	05–06–1927	Leoforos Alexandras Stadium	N/A	1–1	19–06–1927	Leoforos Alexandras Stadium	N/A	1–0
1928–29	18–11–1928	Rouf Municipal Stadium	N/A	2–4	Suspended	Leoforos Alexandras Stadium	—	—
1929–30	20–10–1929	Leoforos Alexandras Stadium	N/A	1–1	06–04–1930	Leoforos Alexandras Stadium	N/A	1–1
1930–31	09–11–1930	Leoforos Alexandras Stadium	N/A	1–2	Suspended	Leoforos Alexandras Stadium	—	—
1933–34	19–11–1933	Leoforos Alexandras Stadium	N/A	1–2	30–04–1934	Leoforos Alexandras Stadium	N/A	5–2
1936–37	06–02–1937	Rouf Municipal Stadium	N/A	2–1	10–04–1937	Leoforos Alexandras Stadium	N/A	2–1
1937–38	10–04–1938	Rouf Municipal Stadium	N/A	2–1	21–11–1937	Leoforos Alexandras Stadium	N/A	0–1
1938–39	30–10–1938	Rouf Municipal Stadium	N/A	2–2	04–12–1938	Leoforos Alexandras Stadium	N/A	0–2
1939–40	12–11–1939	Nikos Goumas Stadium	N/A	1–0	28–01–1940	Leoforos Alexandras Stadium	N/A	0–4
1945–46	Suspended	Nikos Goumas Stadium	—	—	17–03–1946	Leoforos Alexandras Stadium	N/A	2–1
1946–47	02–03–1947	Leoforos Alexandras Stadium	N/A	0–2	24–11–1946	Leoforos Alexandras Stadium	13,000	1–0
1947–48	04–04–1948	Nikos Goumas Stadium	N/A	1–2	30–11–1947	Leoforos Alexandras Stadium	N/A	4–0
1948–49	27–02–1949	Nikos Goumas Stadium	10,000	2–4	10–10–1948	Leoforos Alexandras Stadium	N/A	1–2
1949–50	15–01–1950	Leoforos Alexandras Stadium	10,000	2–1	09–07–1950	Leoforos Alexandras Stadium	1,000	1–0
1950–51	05–11–1950	Leoforos Alexandras Stadium	N/A	4–2	21–01–1951	Leoforos Alexandras Stadium	N/A	1–1
1951–52	06–04–1952	Nikos Goumas Stadium	12,000	2–1	11–11–1951	Leoforos Alexandras Stadium	15,000	0–0
1952–53	07–12–1952	Nikos Goumas Stadium	N/A	2–0	22–02–1953	Leoforos Alexandras Stadium	20,000	2–0
1953–54	13–12–1953	Leoforos Alexandras Stadium	12,000	0–0	08–11–1953	Leoforos Alexandras Stadium	10,000	1–0
1954–55	05–12–1954	Nikos Goumas Stadium	N/A	1–3	10–10–1954	Leoforos Alexandras Stadium	20,000	3–0
1955–56	12–01–1956	Leoforos Alexandras Stadium	N/A	1–4	06–11–1955	Leoforos Alexandras Stadium	10,000	2–1
1956–57	09–12–1956	Nikos Goumas Stadium	N/A	1–2	28–10–1956	Leoforos Alexandras Stadium	20,000	1–1
1957–58	08–12–1957	Nikos Goumas Stadium	N/A	0–2	13–10–1957	Leoforos Alexandras Stadium	25,000	0–1
1958–59	07–09–1958	Nikos Goumas Stadium	15,000	1–1	02–11–1958	Leoforos Alexandras Stadium	25,000	1–1

=== Super League Greece ===
Season	AEK Athens – Panathinaikos				Panathinaikos – AEK Athens			
Season	Date	Venue	Atten.	Score	Date	Venue	Atten.	Score
Panhellenic Championship era (1927–1959)
1930–31	14–06–1931	Leoforos Alexandras Stadium	N/A	2–4	23–04–1931	Leoforos Alexandras Stadium	N/A	2–2
1931–32	13–03–1932	Leoforos Alexandras Stadium	N/A	0–1	29–05–1932	Leoforos Alexandras Stadium	N/A	3–1
1932–33	11–12–1932	Leoforos Alexandras Stadium	N/A	3–2	26–02–1933	Leoforos Alexandras Stadium	N/A	4–4
1933–34	25–02–1934	Leoforos Alexandras Stadium	N/A	1–4	29–04–1934	Leoforos Alexandras Stadium	N/A	5–0
1934–35	19–05–1935	Leoforos Alexandras Stadium	N/A	1–1	14–04–1935	Leoforos Alexandras Stadium	N/A	3–0
1935–36	15–03–1936	Rouf Municipal Stadium	N/A	0–3	29–03–1936	Leoforos Alexandras Stadium	N/A	1–1
1938–39	The results of the Athens FCA League applied							
1939–40	The results of the Athens FCA League applied							
1953–54	13–06–1954	Nikos Goumas Stadium	15,000	0–2	30–05–1954	Leoforos Alexandras Stadium	N/A	1–1
1957–58	15–06–1958	Nikos Goumas Stadium	12,000	1–1	12–03–1958	Leoforos Alexandras Stadium	21,530	1–1
1958–59	15–02–1959	Nikos Goumas Stadium	13,811	2–1	17–05–1959	Leoforos Alexandras Stadium	N/A	1–2
Alpha Ethniki era (1959–2006)
1959–60	09–03–1960	Nikos Goumas Stadium	19,090	1–0	08–11–1959	Leoforos Alexandras Stadium	22,956	2–2
1960–61	26–02–1961	Nikos Goumas Stadium	23,887	2–1	09–10–1960	Leoforos Alexandras Stadium	26,800	2–0 (Note: Abandoned at the 88th minute, while the score was 3–2. Awarded a 2–0 by w/o.)
1961–62	28–03–1962	Nikos Goumas Stadium	35,000	2–3	19–11–1961	Leoforos Alexandras Stadium	24,738	4–1
1962–63	12–05–1963	Nikos Goumas Stadium	34,900	0–2	16–12–1962	Leoforos Alexandras Stadium	25,514	1–1
1963–64	15–04–1964	Nikos Goumas Stadium	34,825	0–1	29–09–1963	Leoforos Alexandras Stadium	N/A	5–4
1964–65	03–01–1965	Nikos Goumas Stadium	34,054	2–2	06–06–1965	Leoforos Alexandras Stadium	24,915	1–0
1965–66	03–04–1966	Nikos Goumas Stadium	30,912	0–2 (Note: The match was abandoned at the 88th minute due to fan incidents, while the score was 1–2 for Panathinaikos. Awarded a 0–2 by w/o.)	19–12–1965	Leoforos Alexandras Stadium	24,535	2–3
1966–67	13–11–1966	Nikos Goumas Stadium	30,855	0–0	05–03–1967	Leoforos Alexandras Stadium	24,069	0–0
1967–68	18–02–1968	Nikos Goumas Stadium	30,811	2–1	22–10–1967	Leoforos Alexandras Stadium	22,887	1–1
1968–69	06–04–1969	Nikos Goumas Stadium	28,565	1–2	01–12–1968	Leoforos Alexandras Stadium	22,803	1–2
1969–70	22–10–1969	Nikos Goumas Stadium	30,084	0–2	15–02–1970	Leoforos Alexandras Stadium	22,968	0–1
1970–71	27–12–1970	Nikos Goumas Stadium	29,174	1–1	23–06–1971	Leoforos Alexandras Stadium	25,338	2–1
1971–72	17–10–1971	Nikos Goumas Stadium	29,966	2–1	27–02–1972	Leoforos Alexandras Stadium	24,817	1–2
1972–73	30–04–1973	Nikos Goumas Stadium	25,042	0–2	17–12–1972	Leoforos Alexandras Stadium	24,760	3–1
1973–74	03–03–1974	Nikos Goumas Stadium	29,800	0–2	14–10–1973	Leoforos Alexandras Stadium	24,728	1–0
1974–75	20–04–1975	Nikos Goumas Stadium	28,866	4–3	22–12–1974	Leoforos Alexandras Stadium	24,510	0–0
1975–76	11–04–1976	Nikos Goumas Stadium	29,010	0–1	14–12–1975	Leoforos Alexandras Stadium	24,960	2–2
1976–77	26–12–1976	Nikos Goumas Stadium	29,106	0–2	15–05–1977	Leoforos Alexandras Stadium	24,200	2–0
1977–78	05–03–1978	Nikos Goumas Stadium	29,806	2–0	30–10–1977	Municipal Stadium of Chalkida	14,150	1–1
1978–79	08–04–1979	Nikos Goumas Stadium	28,789	1–0	10–12–1978	Leoforos Alexandras Stadium	23,150	2–2
1979–80	07–10–1979	Nikos Goumas Stadium	36,100	0–1	03–02–1980	Leoforos Alexandras Stadium	23,200	1–0
1980–81	30–11–1980	Nikos Goumas Stadium	36,766	0–0	10–05–1981	Karaiskakis Stadium	25,387	0–0
1981–82	21–02–1982	Nikos Goumas Stadium	34,329	1–0	27–09–1981	Leoforos Alexandras Stadium	23,720	3–0
1982–83	03–04–1983	Nikos Goumas Stadium	34,038	4–1	28–11–1982	Leoforos Alexandras Stadium	24,000	1–2
1983–84	11–12–1983	Nikos Goumas Stadium	26,634	0–2	15–04–1984	Leoforos Alexandras Stadium	24,399	0–0
1984–85	07–04–1985	Nikos Goumas Stadium	32,341	1–1	25–11–1984	Athens Olympic Stadium	72,732	3–2
1985–86	27–04–1986	Athens Olympic Stadium	64,542	0–0	05–01–1986	Athens Olympic Stadium	74,493	2–1
1986–87	03–05–1987	Athens Olympic Stadium	36,456	0–3	22–12–1986	Athens Olympic Stadium	37,452	1–1
1987–88	24–04–1988	Nikos Goumas Stadium	27,708	2–2	03–01–1988	Athens Olympic Stadium	59,481	1–1
1988–89	05–02–1989	Nikos Goumas Stadium	28,399	0–0	25–09–1988	Athens Olympic Stadium	60,145	0–1
1989–90	06–05–1990	Nikos Goumas Stadium	25,470	1–1	17–12–1989	Athens Olympic Stadium	51,797	0–0
1990–91	25–11–1990	Nikos Goumas Stadium	21,716	1–2	31–03–1991	Athens Olympic Stadium	31,642	4–0
1991–92	08–09–1991	Nikos Goumas Stadium	25,639	0–0	09–02–1992	Athens Olympic Stadium	40,882	2–0
1992–93	04–04–1993	Nikos Goumas Stadium	29,945	3–1	22–11–1992	Athens Olympic Stadium	40,217	1–1
1993–94	23–01–1994	Nikos Goumas Stadium	17,445	2–0	11–09–1993	Athens Olympic Stadium	30,257	1–2
1994–95	07–11–1994	Nikos Goumas Stadium	19,506	0–1	25–03–1995	Athens Olympic Stadium	32,336	3–0
1995–96	18–11–1995	Nikos Goumas Stadium	16,985	1–0	10–04–1996	Athens Olympic Stadium	N/A	1–0
1996–97	12–04–1997	Nikos Goumas Stadium	8,892	3–0	15–12–1996	Athens Olympic Stadium	20,313	2–0
1997–98	27–10–1997	Nikos Goumas Stadium	19,516	2–1	01–03–1998	Athens Olympic Stadium	30,093	0–1
1998–99	13–12–1998	Nikos Goumas Stadium	14,127	2–0	12–05–1999	Athens Olympic Stadium	18,347	0–0
1999–2000	26–09–1999	Karaiskakis Stadium	17,619	1–2	13–02–2000	Athens Olympic Stadium	23,880	1–0
2000–01	07–01–2001	Nikos Goumas Stadium	12,301	1–1	07–05–2001	Leoforos Alexandras Stadium	4,109	0–1
2001–02	04–11–2001	Nikos Goumas Stadium	13,169	2–0	03–03–2002	Leoforos Alexandras Stadium	15,166	2–0
2002–03	14–09–2002	Nikos Goumas Stadium	13,801	1–0	09–02–2003	Leoforos Alexandras Stadium	12,439	2–1
2003–04	21–09–2003	Nea Smyrni Stadium	9,472	2–2	01–02–2004	Leoforos Alexandras Stadium	10,645	2–1
2004–05	09–01–2005	Athens Olympic Stadium	44,193	1–0	15–05–2005	Leoforos Alexandras Stadium	Cl. doors	0–0
2005–06	23–10–2005	Athens Olympic Stadium	28,623	3–0	05–03–2006	Athens Olympic Stadium	31,446	1–0
Super League era (2006–present)
2006–07	18–02–2007	Athens Olympic Stadium	19,810	1–4	23–10–2006	Athens Olympic Stadium	33,199	1–2
2007–08	02–03–2008	Athens Olympic Stadium	40,610	1–1	11–11–2007	Leoforos Alexandras Stadium	15,202	2–1
2008–09	31–08–2008	Athens Olympic Stadium	30,140	2–1	04–01–2009	Athens Olympic Stadium	42,018	0–0
2009–10	27–09–2009	Athens Olympic Stadium	22,423	0–1	31–01–2010	Athens Olympic Stadium	47,379	1–1
2010–11	24–10–2010	Athens Olympic Stadium	27,957	1–0	13–02–2011	Athens Olympic Stadium	37,258	3–1
2011–12	11–03–2012	Athens Olympic Stadium	14,270	2–0	06–11–2011	Athens Olympic Stadium	32,929	3–2
2012–13	03–03–2013	Athens Olympic Stadium	16,919	0–2	04–11–2012	Athens Olympic Stadium	12,528	1–0
2015–16	28–02–2016	Athens Olympic Stadium	20,930	1–0	01–11–2015	Leoforos Alexandras Stadium	15,640	0–0
2016–17	02–04–2017	Athens Olympic Stadium	18,526	2–3	15–01–2017	Leoforos Alexandras Stadium	6,955	0–0
2017–18	01–04–2018	Athens Olympic Stadium	27,106	3–0	19–11–2017	Leoforos Alexandras Stadium	8,734	1–1
2018–19	09–03–2019	Athens Olympic Stadium	10,145	0–0	03–11–2018	Athens Olympic Stadium	24,731	0–0
2019–20	09–02–2020	Athens Olympic Stadium	20,374	1–0	10–11–2019	Athens Olympic Stadium	11,056	3–2
2020–21	06–12–2020	Athens Olympic Stadium	Cl. doors	1–2	28–02–2021	Leoforos Alexandras Stadium	Cl. doors	1–1
2021–22	05–12–2021	Athens Olympic Stadium	17,544	1–0	27–02–2022	Leoforos Alexandras Stadium	5,943	3–0
2022–23	08–01–2023	Agia Sophia Stadium	31,100	1–0	11–09–2022	Leoforos Alexandras Stadium	13,943	2–1
2023–24	14–01–2024	Agia Sophia Stadium	Cl. doors	2–2	25–09–2023	Leoforos Alexandras Stadium	16,002	1–2
2024–25	29–09–2024	Agia Sophia Stadium	31,000	2–0	19–01–2025	Athens Olympic Stadium	22,937	1–0
2025–26	19–01-2026	Agia Sophia Stadium	31,000	4–0	30–11–2025	Leoforos Alexandras Stadium	13,565	2–3

==== Play-off match ====
Season	AEK Athens – Panathinaikos				Panathinaikos – AEK Athens			
Season	Date	Venue	Atten.	Score	Date	Venue	Atten.	Score
1959–60					31–07–1960	Karaiskakis Stadium (Note: Neutral ground.)	20,923	2–1
1962–63	23–06–1963	Nikos Goumas Stadium	35,000	3–3 (Note: The game was played at Nikos Goumas Stadium after an agreement by both clubs. Since there were no extra time or penalty shoot-out regulations, AEK Athens won the championship due to better goal ratio.)				
1979–80					24–05–1980	Karaiskakis Stadium (Note: Neutral ground.)	18,350	1–0
2007–08	14–05–2008	Athens Olympic Stadium	5,032	1–1	30–04–2008	Leoforos Alexandras Stadium	8,528	4–1
2008–09	31–05–2009	Athens Olympic Stadium	30,435	0–2	13–05–2009	Athens Olympic Stadium	22,980	1–1
2010–11	25–05–2011	Athens Olympic Stadium	Cl. doors	0–2	12–05–2011	Athens Olympic Stadium	8,831	1–1
2011–12	07–05–2012	Athens Olympic Stadium	6,018	2–0	20–05–2012	Athens Olympic Stadium	11,260	1–0
2015–16	26–05–2016	Athens Olympic Stadium	6,919	3–1	23–05–2016	Leoforos Alexandras Stadium	8,018	3–0
2016–17	21–05–2017	Athens Olympic Stadium	5,318	1–0	24–05–2017	Leoforos Alexandras Stadium	3,857	1–0
2019–20	07–06–2020	Athens Olympic Stadium	Cl. doors	1–1	12–07–2020	Athens Olympic Stadium	Cl. doors	1–3
2020–21	21–04–2021	Athens Olympic Stadium	Cl. doors	1–1	09–05–2021	Leoforos Alexandras Stadium	Cl. doors	0–1
2021–22	08–05–2022	Athens Olympic Stadium	15,519	0–0	13–03–2022	Leoforos Alexandras Stadium	5,497	1–1
2022–23	19–03–2023	Agia Sophia Stadium	30,450	0–0	30–04–2023	Leoforos Alexandras Stadium	13,373	0–0
2023–24	24–04–2024	Agia Sophia Stadium	30,082	3–0	03–04–2024	Leoforos Alexandras Stadium	12,101	2–1
2024–25	04–05–2025	Agia Sophia Stadium	22,172	1–2	06–04–2025	Athens Olympic Stadium	10,272	3–1
2025–26	10–05–2026	Agia Sophia Stadium	31,100	2–1	03–05–2025	Leoforos Alexandras Stadium	8,608	0–0

=== Greek Cup ===
Season	Round	AEK – Panathinaikos				Panathinaikos – AEK				Winner
Season	Round	Date	Venue	Atten.	Score	Date	Venue	Atten.	Score	Winner
1947–48	Final					20–06–1948	Leoforos Alexandras Stadium	12,000	2–1	PAO
1948–49	Final					19–06–1949	Leoforos Alexandras Stadium	15,000	0–0 (a.e.t.) (Note: Abandoned at the 109 minute.)	AEK
1948–49	Final					03–07–1949	Leoforos Alexandras Stadium	15,000	1–2 (a.e.t.) (Note: Replay match)	AEK
1949–50	Semi-finals					30–04–1950	Leoforos Alexandras Stadium	N/A	1–1 (a.e.t.)	AEK
1949–50	Semi-finals					11–05–1950	Leoforos Alexandras Stadium	N/A	1–3 (a.e.t.)	AEK
1951–52	Quarter-finals	10–02–1952	Nikos Goumas Stadium	12,000	1–1 (a.e.t.)	30–03–1952	Leoforos Alexandras Stadium	16,000	0–0 (a.e.t.) (Note: Replay match, AEK won coin toss.)	AEK
1955–56	Semi-finals	13–06–1956	Nikos Goumas Stadium	N/A	2–1					AEK
1958–59	Round of 16	13–05–1959	Karaiskakis Stadium	17,000	1–0 (Note: The original match was played on 26 April 1959 at Nikos Goumas Stadium. It was interrupted in the 54th minute at 0–0.)					AEK
1966–67	Quarter-finals	25–06–1967	Nikos Goumas Stadium	35,000	1–2					PAO
1969–70	Round of 32	22–03–1970	Nikos Goumas Stadium	N/A	1–1 (3–5 p)					PAO
1977–78	Round of 32					01–02–1978	Leoforos Alexandras Stadium	23,050	0–1	AEK
1980–81	Round of 16	04–02–1981	Nikos Goumas Stadium	27,797	1–0 (Note: AEK won on away goals)	07–01–1981	Leoforos Alexandras Stadium	18,094	3–2	AEK
1985–86	Semi-finals	11–05–1986	Athens Olympic Stadium	52,284	2–2	19–05–1986	Athens Olympic Stadium	50,000	2–1	PAO
1993–94	Group Stage	08–09–1993	Nikos Goumas Stadium	6,344	2–2					Both
1993–94	Final					20–04–1994	Athens Olympic Stadium	61,232	3–3 (4–2 p)	PAO
1994–95	Final					19–04–1995	Athens Olympic Stadium	60,777	1–0 (a.e.t.)	PAO
1995–96	Group Stage					08–11–1995	Athens Olympic Stadium	1,662	3–1	Both
1995–96	Quarter-finals	31–01–1996	Nikos Goumas Stadium	14,253	3–1	14–02–1996	Athens Olympic Stadium	29,862	2–2	AEK
1996–97	Final	16–04–1997	Karaiskakis Stadium	21,926	0–0 (5–3 p)					AEK
2000–01	Group Stage	29–11–2000	Nikos Goumas Stadium	1,309	3–1	13–08–2000	Athens Olympic Stadium	6,490	2–1	Both
2003–04	Semi-finals	07–04–2004	Giannis Pathiakakis Stadium	5,000	0–1	27–03–2004	Leoforos Alexandras Stadium	8,657	2–2	PAO
2004–05	Round of 16	27–01–2005	Athens Olympic Stadium	17,280	1–1	03–02–2005	Leoforos Alexandras Stadium	5,153	1–3	AEK
2010–11	Quarter-finals	02–02–2011	Athens Olympic Stadium	23,000	2–3	19–01–2011	Athens Olympic Stadium	37,280	0–2	AEK

• Series won: AEK Athens 11, Panathinaikos 7.

=== Greek Super Cup ===
Season	Date	Venue	Atten.	Score
1989–90	30–08–1989	Athens Olympic Stadium	39,300	1–1 (6–5 p)
1993–94	18–08–1993	Athens Olympic Stadium	35,000	0–1
1994–95	17–08–1994	Athens Olympic Stadium	15,457	0–3
1996–97	11–08–1996	Karaiskakis Stadium	21,926	1–1 (8–9 p)

== Top scorers ==
Rank	Player	Club	League (Note: Includes the goals from Athens FCA League)	Greek Cup	Super Cup	League Cup	Total
1	(Greece) Vangelis Panakis	Panathinaikos	15	0	0	0	15
2	(Greece) Antonis Antoniadis	Panathinaikos	10	1	0	0	11
2	(Greece) Dimitris Saravakos	Both clubs	7	3	1	0	11
4	(Greece) Mimis Papaioannou	AEK Athens	9	1	0	0	10
4	(Poland) Krzysztof Warzycha	Panathinaikos	6	4	0	0	10
6	(Greece) Nikos Liberopoulos	Both clubs	6	3	0	0	9
7	(Greece) Kostas Nestoridis	AEK Athens	8	0	0	0	8
7	(Greece) Kostas Nikolaidis	AEK Athens	8	0	0	0	8
7	(Greece) Panagiotis Sourmelis	Panathinaikos	8	0	0	0	8
7	(Greece) Andreas Papaemmanouil	Both clubs	7	1	0	0	8
7	(Greece) Nikos Simos	Panathinaikos	5	3	0	0	8
12	(Greece) Antonis Tsolinas	Panathinaikos	7	0	0	0	7
12	(Greece) Mimis Domazos	Both clubs	7	0	0	0	7
12	(Serbia) Luka Jović	AEK Athens	7	0	0	0	7
15	(Greece) Alexis Alexandris	AEK Athens	4	2	0	0	6
16	(Greece) Lakis Petropoulos	Panathinaikos	5	0	0	0	5
16	(Greece) Thomas Mavros	AEK Athens	5	0	0	0	5
16	(Greece) Kleanthis Maropoulos	AEK Athens	4	1	0	0	5
16	(Greece) Manolis Kountouris	AEK Athens	4	1	0	0	5
16	(Greece) Giannis Kanakis	AEK Athens	4	1	0	0	5
16	(Greece) Takis Loukanidis	Panathinaikos	4	1	0	0	5
16	(Greece) Kostas Batsinilas	Panathinaikos	3	2	0	0	5
16	(North Macedonia) Toni Savevski	AEK Athens	3	1	1	0	5

== Personnel at both clubs ==
=== Players ===
From Panathinaikos to AEK Athens

- 1924: (Greece) Kostas Dimopoulos
- 1930: (Greece) Antonis Tziralidis
- 1935: (Greece) Spyros Sklavounos
- 1936: (Greece) Dimitris Sofianopoulos
- 1936: (Greece) Kostas Christodoulou
- 1956: (Greece) Sofoklis Arvanitis
- 1957: (Greece) Filippos Asimakopoulos (via Athinaikos)
- 1963: (Greece) Kostas Papageorgiou (via Atromitos)
- 1969: (Greece) Andreas Papaemmanouil
- 1978: (Greece) Dimitris Kotsos (via Kastoria)
- 1978: (Greece) Mimis Domazos (Note: Returned to Panthinaikos in 1980 after joining AEK for 1 1/2 seasons.)
- 1980: (Greece) Kostas Eleftherakis
- 1988: (Greece) Antonis Minou
- 1988: (Greece) Giorgos Famelis
- 1994: (Greece) Dimitris Saravakos (Note: Returned to Panthinaikos in 1997 after joining AEK for 2 seasons.)
- 1995: (Greece) Konstantinos Pavlopoulos (via OFI)
- 1997: (Greece) Giannis Kalitzakis
- 1997: (Greece) Georgios Donis (via Blackburn Rovers)
- 1998: (Greece) Dimitris Markos (via Sheffield United and Kalamata)
- 2001: (Albania) Bledar Kola
- 2003: (Greece) Nikos Liberopoulos
- 2005: (Greece) Georgios Alexopoulos (via Iraklis and Egaleo)
- 2005: (Greece) Miltiadis Sapanis
- 2008: (Greece) Angelos Basinas (via Mallorca)
- 2008: (Greece) Sotirios Kyrgiakos (via Rangers and Eintracht Frankfurt)
- 2011: (Greece) Xenofon Fetsis
- 2013: (Greece) Antonis Petropoulos
- 2016: (Greece) Lazaros Christodoulopoulos (via Bologna and Hellas Verona)
- 2018: (Sweden) Niklas Hult
- 2020: (Argentina) Emanuel Insúa
- 2022: (Serbia) Mijat Gaćinović
- 2024: (Italy) Alberto Brignoli

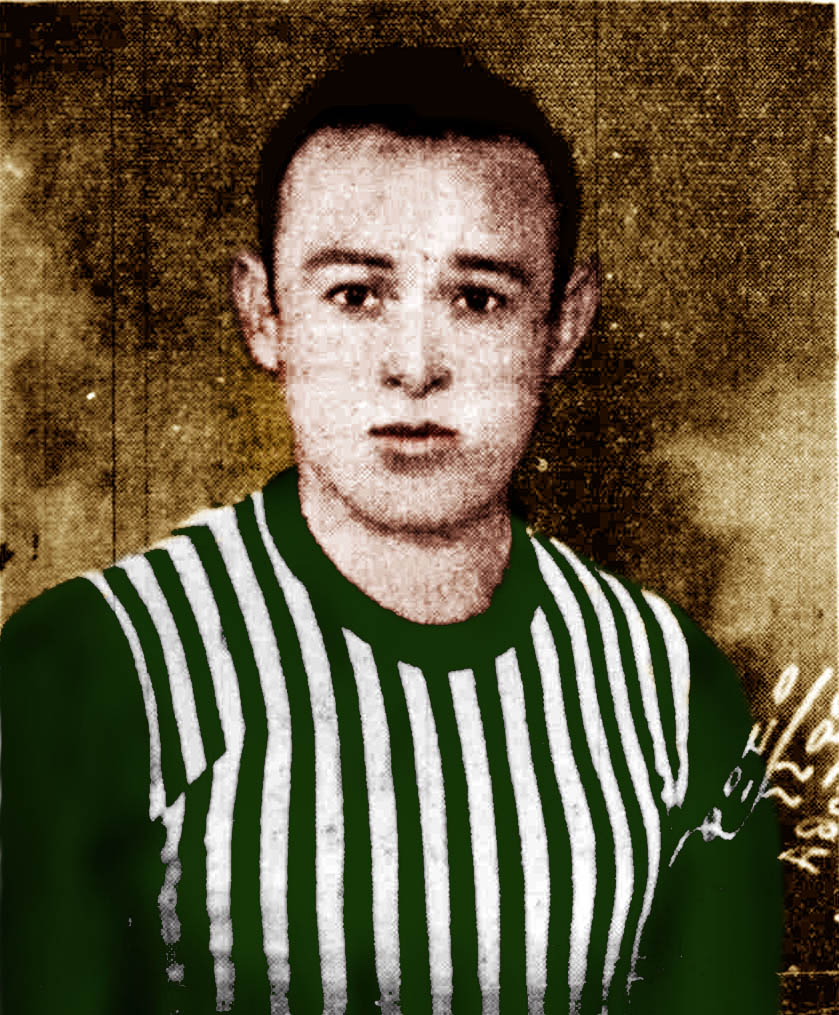
Lysandros Dikaiopoulos played for AEK and Panathinaikos and lost his life in a match between the two teams

From AEK Athens to Panathinaikos

- 1926: (Greece) Nikos Kitsos
- 1933: (Greece) Anastasios Kritikos
- 1937: (Greece) Lysandros Dikaiopoulos
- 1978: (West Germany) Walter Wagner (via Aris)
- 1985: (Greece) Vangelis Vlachos
- 1985: (Greece) Lysandros Georgamlis
- 1987: (Hungary) Márton Esterházy
- 1994: (Greece) Tasos Mitropoulos
- 2002: (Greece) Pantelis Konstantinidis (via Apollon Athens and PAOK)
- 2009: (Greece) Kostas Katsouranis (via Benfica)
- 2013: (Belgium) Victor Klonaridis (via Lille ) (Note: Returned to AEK in 2017 after joining Panthinaikos for 3 1/2 seasons.)
- 2013: (Greece) Georgios Koutroumpis
- 2014: (Greece) Christos Bourbos (via Iraklis and OFI)
- 2017: (Greece) Dimitrios Kolovetsios
- 2024: (Greece) Anastasios Bakasetas (via Alanyaspor and Trabzonspor)
- 2026: (Trinidad and Tobago) Levi García (via Spartak Moscow)

=== Managers ===
- (Greece) Themos Asderis
  - AEK Athens: 1932–1933, 1936–1937
  - Panthinaikos: 1943–1944
- (Hungary) Ferenc Puskás
  - Panthinaikos: 1970–1974
  - AEK Athens: 1978–1979
- (Austria) Helmut Senekowitsch
  - Panthinaikos: 1980–81
  - AEK Athens: 1983, 1983–1984
- (Poland) Jacek Gmoch
  - Panthinaikos: 1983–1985, 2010
  - AEK Athens: 1985–1986
- (Portugal) Fernando Santos
  - AEK Athens: 2001–2002, 2004–2006
  - Panthinaikos: 2002
- (Greece) Georgios Donis
  - AEK Athens: 2008
  - Panthinaikos: 2018–2020
- (Greece) Marinos Ouzounidis
  - Panthinaikos: 2016–2018
  - AEK Athens: 2018–2019
