= Lambis Serafidis =

Greek footballer and manager (1929–2003)

Lambis Serafeidis
Personal information
- Full name: Charalambos Serafidis
- Date of birth: 1929
- Place of birth: Aigaleo, Athens, Greece
- Date of death: 20 August 2003 (aged 73–74)
- Place of death: Athens, Greece
- Position: Forward

Youth career
- –1946: AE Ierapoli

Senior career*
Years	Team	Apps	(Gls)
1946–1948	AEK Athens	0	(0)
1948–1951	Apollon Athens	0	(0)
1951–1954	AEK Athens	0	(0)
1954–1965	Apollon Athens	120	(41)
Total		120	(41)

International career
1952	Greece Military		
1950–1960	Greece	12	(3)
1960	Greece Olympic	2	(2)

Managerial career
- 1976–1978: Egaleo
- 1980: Egaleo
- * Club domestic league appearances and goals

Lambis Serafidis (Greek: Λάμπης Σεραφείδης; 1929 – 20 August 2003) was a Greek professional footballer who played as a forward and a manager.

== Club career ==
Serafidis played mainly as a left winger and started his football career at a club of his neighborhood, AE Ierapoli. At the age of 17, he moved to AEK Athens, where he played for two seasons, however he did not manage to participate in an official match. In 1948 he moved to the neighboring Apollon Athens playing for two years. In 1951 he returned to AEK, where he remained for another three seasons until 1954, having 9 appearances and 6 goals in the Athens championship. In 1954 Serafidis returned to Apollon Athens as well, where he played until 1965, when he retired as a footballer.

== International career ==
He played in twelve matches for the Greece national football team from 1950 to 1960. He was also part of Greece's team for their qualification matches for the 1954 FIFA World Cup. He also played with the military team and won the World Military Cup in 1952.

== Managerial career ==
Serafidis was occasionally involved in coaching, taking charge over Egaleo, the club where he took his first football steps. In the first of his two spells at the Athenian team, remaining in his position for the entire season, he won the second division championship of the Southern Group and the promotion to the first division.

== Other activities ==
Between 1961 and about 1965, still being an active footballer although he was a substitute, Serafidis invested in business and enacted with the former entertainment center of Panos Gavalas in the forest of the Kaisariani Shooting Range. He was the one who reformed the appearance of the place and renamed it "Charama", a name where in the following decades it developed into a popular spot on the Athenian music scene and hosted well-known representatives of Greek music.

== Personal life ==
He was the older brother of Stelios, who was also a footballer that played as a goalkeeper and followed him from Apollon on his return to AEK in 1951, but he remained at the club for over 20 years as a football player and then in various coaching positions until the 2010s. Although the two brothers coexisted in national team assignments, they ultimately did not compete at the same time, as Stelios, Lambis’ junior by six years, was anointed an international only a few months before Lambis retired.

== Career statistics ==
=== Club ===
Appearances and goals by club, season and competition
Club	Season	League			AFCA League		Cup		Total	
Club	Season	Division	Apps	Goals	Apps	Goals	Apps	Goals	Apps	Goals
Apollon Athens	1948–49	Panhellenic Championship	0	0	13	4	1	0	14	4
Apollon Athens	1949–50	Panhellenic Championship	0	0	12	3	1	1	13	4
Apollon Athens	1950–51	Panhellenic Championship	0	0	10	4	3	2	13	6
AEK Athens	1951–52	Panhellenic Championship	0	0	0	0	0	0	0	0
AEK Athens	1952–53	Panhellenic Championship	0	0	9	6	4	2	13	8
AEK Athens	1953–54	Panhellenic Championship	0	0	0	0	0	0	0	0
Apollon Athens	1954–55	Panhellenic Championship	8	4	13	4	4	3	25	11
Apollon Athens	1955–56	Panhellenic Championship	17	7	3	0	3	2	23	9
Apollon Athens	1956–57	Panhellenic Championship	15	5	12	2	2	0	29	7
Apollon Athens	1957–58	Panhellenic Championship	11	5	8	0	1	0	24	5
Apollon Athens	1958–59	Panhellenic Championship	0	0	11	4	5	3	16	7
Apollon Athens	1959–60	Alpha Ethniki	30	8	—		4	3	34	11
Apollon Athens	1960–61	Alpha Ethniki	22	8	—		2	2	24	10
Apollon Athens	1961–62	Alpha Ethniki	6	2	—		3	1	9	3
Apollon Athens	1962–63	Alpha Ethniki	5	2	—		0	0	5	2
Apollon Athens	1963–64	Alpha Ethniki	5	0	—		1	0	6	0
Apollon Athens	1964–65	Alpha Ethniki	1	0	—		0	0	1	0
Career total			120	41	91	27	34	19	245	87

=== International ===
Appearances and goals by national team and year
National team	Year	Apps	Goals
Greece	1950	2	0
Greece	1952	1	0
Greece	1953	4	0
Greece	1954	1	0
Greece	1955	1	0
Greece	1959	1	1
Greece	1960	2	2
Total		12	3

== Honours ==
=== As a player ===
Apollon Athens

- Athens FCA League: 1958

Greece military

- World Military Cup: 1952

=== As a manager ===
Egaleo

- Beta Ethniki: 1976–77 (South group)
