= Kostas Nestoridis =

Greek footballer and manager (1930–2023)

- Signed photograph of Kostas Nestoridis

Personal information
- Full name: Konstantinos Nestoridis
- Date of birth: 15 March 1930
- Place of birth: Drama, Greece
- Date of death: 12 December 2023 (aged 93)
- Place of death: Athens, Greece
- Height: 1.75 m (5 ft 9 in)
- Position: Forward

Youth career
- 1945–1946: Enosi Agios Nikolaos Kallithea
- 1946–1948: Hellas Moschato

Senior career*
Years	Team	Apps	(Gls)
1949–1955	Panionios	3	(0)
1955–1967	AEK Athens	208	(172)
1966	→ South Melbourne Hellas (loan)	20	(21)
1967	Vyzas Megara	2	(0)
1967	South Melbourne Hellas	17	(12)
1968	Aias Salamina	7	(2)
Total		257	(207)

International career
1950–1962	Greece	17	(3)
1951–1956	Greece military	2	(0)
1960	Greece Olympic	3	(0)

Managerial career
- 1966: South Melbourne Hellas
- 1967–1968: South Melbourne Hellas
- 1968: Aias Salamina
- 1968–1969: Kallithea
- 1969–1970: PAO Thriamvos Athens
- 1970–1971: Paniliakos
- 1971–1972: Kallithea
- 1972–1973: Vyzas Megara
- 1973–1974: Aias Salamina
- 1976–1977: AEK Athens U20
- 1978–1979: Kallithea
- 1981: Pandramaikos
- 1981: Kallithea
- 1981–1983: AEK Athens (assistant)
- 1983: AEK Athens (interim)
- 1984: AEK Athens
- 1987: AE Kos
- 1987–1988: Aris Agios Konstantinos
- 1988: Kallithea
- 1989: Aias Salamina
- * Club domestic league appearances and goals

Kostas Nestoridis (Greek: Κώστας Νεστορίδης, 15 March 1930 – 12 December 2023) was a Greek professional footballer who played as a forward and later a manager. He is widely considered as one of the greatest players in the history of AEK Athens and one of the most iconic figures in Greek football. A prolific and technically gifted forward, he emerged as the top scorer of the Greek championship a record five consecutive times and remains among the all-time top scorers of AEK. Apart from his scoring abilities he was renowned for his dribbling, creativity and set-piece ability.

Born in Drama to a refugee family, Nestoridis experienced severe poverty in his early years, which affected both his life and football career. He began his senior career with Panionios, where he won the AFCA league in 1951, before moving to AEK Athens in 1955, though a contractual dispute led to a two-year suspension. After making his official debut in 1957, he became the club’s leading figure, forming a notable attacking partnership with Mimis Papaioannou and playing a key role in the conquest of the Greek Championship in 1963.

Nestoridis later served as a player-manager for South Melbourne Hellas in Australia, where he won a state championship, before ending his playing career in Greece. Internationally, he earned 17 caps for the Greece national football team. Following his retirement, he had a varied managerial career, including spells at AEK Athens in both assistant and interim roles.

== Early life ==
Nestoridis was born on 15 March 1930 in Drama and was the youngest of three children of the Pontian Greek Giorgos and Kyriaki, who arrived in Thrace as refugees after the Asia Minor Catastrophe. He and his siblings, Christos and Nopi, experienced severe financial hardship and the struggles of refugee life during their childhood. The work difficulties that his parents repeatedly faced affected the young Nestoridis and often influenced his decisions throughout his football career. With his family, he traveled from the dirt roads of Drama, to the fields of Kallithea in search of labor and later to the fields of Preveza, where they took refuge during the Occupation. There, his talent in football quickly attracted attention. Even though he loved playing football, it always came second in his priorities, as the need for assistance in the family finances came first, something that forced Nestoridis to work from a young age as a polisher, cigarette seller, shoemaker assistant and shepherd during his days at Preveza. After the end of World War II, his family returned and resettled in Kallithea. There, Nestoridis became involved more actively with football, joining an independent club from his neighborhood called PAO Kallithea. They were not a recognizable club, but they provided their players with a football kit and lemonade at half-time, both of which were almost considered luxuries for the young Nestoridis at the time. In his debut, he scored five goals and his performances quickly began to build a reputation around his name. That reputation spread beyond Kallithea and soon attracted the attention of the manager of AEK Athens, Kostas Negrepontis, who was looking for a partner to Kleanthis Maropoulos in the offense of his team. One Sunday afternoon in Kallithea, Negrepontis was impressed by the dribbling skills and shooting technique of Nestoridis and invited the player to Nea Filadelfeia for a tryout. AEK's officials were impressed by his talent, but did not ask him to sign a sports card, while they responded to his persistent calls for employment with some vague promises of appointing him to the Water Company. After about a month, during which nothing materialized, Nestoridis left AEK and football training, prioritizing finding a solution to his intense livelihood problem.

== Club career ==
=== Early years ===
Nestoridis made his next step in his football career on a night in 1946, when his neighbor and friend, Kostas Sotiriadis, who was playing for Panionios, met him in Kallithea Square and suggested that he visit Nea Smyrni for another tryout. There, the manager Roussopoulos, having received information from Sotiriadis and impressed by his abilities, made him sign a sports card, including him in the roster of Panionios. His urgent need for daily work as a cigarette retailer did not allow him to continue training with Panionios.

He occasionally played football in his neighborhood until Karamalengos, the owner of the factory "Indiana" and a member of Hellas Moschato, heard about him. He offered Nestoridis a steady job in his business and invited him to sign for his team. The young Nestoridis, seeing that his two main ambitions, the steady job and football were being realized at the same time, signed a fake sports card under the name "Brinzos", as was the nickname of his brother, Christos and started playing in Hellas Moschato. The team became champions of their division in Piraeus Football Clubs Association, with Nestoridis scoring 48 goals and becoming their star player. He played for the club from Moschato until 1948. His career there ended abruptly, as before the start of the crucial match for the championship against Palia Kokkinia, a rival fan recognized Nestoridis and started calling out his real name. The officials of Hellas, fearing the revelation of forgery and punishment, did not use him, resulting in the 2–1 defeat and the loss of the championship. Their subsequent efforts to secure a free transfer of Nestoridis from Panionios were also fruitless.

=== Panionios ===
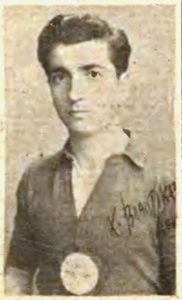
Nestoridis with Panionios

After spending a year out of competitive football, Nestoridis joined Panionios in 1949, encouraged by former Olympiacos footballer Babis Kotridis. There, he eventually got the chance to play under Negrepontis, who was the manager at the time, and the two formed a strong friendship. He wore the blue-red jersey for seven years and in 63 appearances he scored 26 goals, which included 3 appearances in the Panhellenic Championship. During his spell they won their first and only AFCA league title in 1951, where he emerged as the top scorer with seven goals. During that season, he also managed to score in the away 2–1 victory against AEK Athens, and made his debut for the national team. The following season, he reached the final, where they lost to Olympiacos in a replay match as the first match ended in a draw. Nevertheless, Nestoridis did not enjoy his time at the club. The "cliques" of the older players considered him an "outsider" and did not miss the opportunity to antagonize him, while from the side of the management he was treated simply as a product that at some point would fill the club's coffers by transferring to one of the big clubs of POK.

In May 1955, AEK Athens organized a "Solidarity Cup" with the earnings of the tournament going for the completion of the works in their stadium. Panionios participated in the tournament and after its end in June, their administration pressured him to transfer to Olympiacos or Panathinaikos. He refused, remaining loyal to his refugee background and on 8 July following the actions of the vice-president of AEK, Vasilis Sevastakis, he signed for the yellow-blacks, who gave him 15,000 drachmas, but without the consent of Panionios. As a result, he was punished by the HFF with a two-year ban from all competitive activities.

=== AEK Athens ===
==== 1955–1957 ====
Nestoridis was frustrated, as he waited for his punishment to expire, competing only in friendly matches, with his only distractions being his marriage and the birth of his son. The end of his punishment and his debut in the yellow-black jersey came in September 1957. His arrival at AEK also marked a period of renewal for the club. The managerial duo of the former players, Tzanetis and Negrepontis took charge of the club's renewal. The veterans such as Delavinias, Maropoulos and Arvanitis departed, passing the torch to the younger Serafidis, Stamatiadis and Poulis, with Kanakis being the "connecting spot".

==== 1957–1959 ====
During his time at the club, he acquired the nickname "Captain Nestoras". He immediately established himself at the club and it did not take him long to become a star player domestically. With his acquisition, AEK began returned in becoming title challengers the after years and in his debut season, they finished second in the AFCA league, as well as in the Panhellenic Championship, two points behind Olympiacos. Nestoridis finished second in the scorer's standings with 12 goals. In the following season the club repeated its course in the Panhellenic Championship, but this time Nestoridis finished as the league's top scorer with 21 goals.

==== 1959–1962 ====
In the summer of 1959 the Panhellenic Championship was reformed into a single championship of a national division, the Alpha Ethniki. On 6 December 1959, Nestoridis scored the first hat-trick in the history of Alpha Ethniki in an away match against Panegialios. On 9 January 1960, on the eve of the derby against Olympiacos, a photo was published in which Nestoridis pointed to the upper-right corner of the goalposts of Savvas Theodoridis and stated that if AEK took the kick-off of the match, he would send the ball in that corner, from the first minute. The next day, immediately with the kick-off, Nestoridis scored a goal in the corner he had indicated in the photo. AEK finished tied in the first place with Panathinaikos and they lost the title after a 2–1 defeat in the play-off that was set between them. Nestoridis emerged as top scorer for a second season in a row with 33 goals. In 1960, Nice and Essen wanted to sign him, but he refused.

On 7 March 1961, the administration of AEK imposed a one-month ban on him, because in the match against Panionios, he showed unsportsmanlike behavior towards his colleagues and the referee, but after two weeks they spared the rest of his penalty. At the end of the season, AEK finished fourth, but Nestoridis emerged as top scorer for the third time with 27 goals. In the following season, AEK repeated their fourth place finish and Nestoridis again finished as the top scorer with 29 goals.

==== 1962–1965 ====
In 1962, alongside the newcomer, Mimis Papaioannou, he formed one of the club's most prolific attacking partnerships. Nestoridis became the second player to score five goals in a single league match which he achieved on 2 June 1963 against Iraklis. On 23 June, he scored from a direct corner kick in the play-off match against Panathinaikos, which ended 3–3. This resulted in AEK winning their first league title in 23 years, while Nestoridis won the only Greek Championship of his career. At the end of the season, he emerged as the top scorer of the league with 23 goals, the only player to finish as the top scorer of the Greek championship five consecutive times. In the following summer, Austria Wien was interested in signing him, but he stayed at the Greek club. On 18 September 1963, Nestoridis scored AEK's first goal in UEFA competitions, in the heavy 7–2 defeat against Monaco, for the European Cup. At the end of the season, AEK finished third in the league, but won the Greek Cup. In his first eight seasons for AEK, Nestoridis was the club's top scorer except 1964, when Papaioannou emerged as top scorer of the league, surpassing him. In the following season, AEK were in contention for the title, but eventually finished second. In the summer of 1965, he initially took the decision to leave the club, but the possible departure of Papaioannou made him reconsider and eventually stay for one more season, despite his advanced age.

=== South Melbourne Hellas and Vyzas Megara ===
On 12 January 1966, the administration of AEK allowed him to play for a club abroad. Thus, on 15 March, Nestoridis departed for Australia, seeking a better life and greater professional opportunities and signed as a player-manager for the expatriate South Melbourne Hellas. Even though he was 36 years old, Nestoridis finished his first season at the club as the top scorer of the Victorian State League with 21 goals and helped his team to win the title. His presence attracted large crowds, with members of the Greek community joining Australian supporters to watch him play.

After the end of the season, Nestoridis returned to Greece and AEK Athens on 10 December 1966. After about a month of discussions over whether he would be included in the team's roster, the club's administration eventually decided to grant him a free transfer to another club and on 13 January 1967, Nestoridis signed for Vyzas Megara with the condition that he would not play against AEK. On 29 January, he made his debut in a 1–0 home win over Panathinaikos, providing the assist for Sakis Kouvas' goal. However, Panathinaikos filed an objection over Nestoridis's eligibility to play, claiming that he had been registered after the deadline. The HFF initially ruled in favour of Vyzas Megara and Nestoridis subsequently played on 12 February in the 3–0 home defeat to Proodeftiki. The Union of Professional Footballers' Associations did not accept the decision by the HFF and on 15 February the objection of Panathinaikos was upheld and they were awarded the match. The following day, his transfer was also cancelled by the Union of Professional Footballers' Associations. On 26 May, the decision to award the match to Panathinaikos was reversed, but the cancellation of the transfer of Nestoridis remained in effect.

His inability to compete in Greece led him to return to Australia on 19 April and rejoin Hellas Melbourne for another season. In his second spell at the club, Nestoridis scored another 12 goals in the Victorian State League, with Hellas finishing fourth in the standings.

=== Aias Salamina ===
Afterwards, Nestoridis returned to Greece in search of a club and trained successively with Egaleo, Panionios and Ionikos. On 28 February 1968, he signed as a player-manager for Aias Salamina, where he played in the second division. He made his debut on 3 March 1968 in a 2–1 away defeat against PAS Giannina and scored his first goal on 31 March in a home match against AE Chania that ended 2–1. On 19 April, Nestoridis resigned from his position at Aias, subsequently ending his playing career.

== International career ==
In 1950, Nestoridis volunteered for the Air Force to play for the Greek Military team, where he started scoring prolifically and participated in the CISM Football Cup. When his two-year term expired, he declared another four years, remaining in the military for six years in total. However, in a match with the Italian Military team in 1956, a dispute arose over how an ordinary soldier participated in the Military team for so many years without being an officer. He was then offered a job in the Air Force, but he refused and withdrew from the Military team.

Nestoridis played with Greece a total of 17 times: 2 as a player of Panionios and 15 as a player of AEK Athens, scoring 3 goals. He made his debut in the blue and white jersey on 14 October 1951. Nestoridis later attributed his limited number of appearances to his poor relations with the national team's selectors.

== Managerial career ==
After his playing career ended, Nestoridis began his managerial career. In 1968, Kallithea hired Nestoridis alongside Takis Papoulidis as co-managers late in the season. The duo helped the club to its first-ever promotion to the second division, culminating with a 1–0 win in the extra-time over AO Koropi in a play-off match on 21 June 1969. In 1969 he was the manager of PAO Thriamvos Athens for a season. In 1970 he worked at Paniliakos for a season. On 23 July 1971, he signed for Kallithea, where he spent a season. On 9 August 1972, he took charge of Vyzas Megara for a season. On 16 August 1973, Nestoridis returned to Aias Salamina solely as their manager. In 1977 he was the manager of the reserve team of AEK, which won the championship. Later he worked in various clubs such as Kallithea and Pandramaikos.

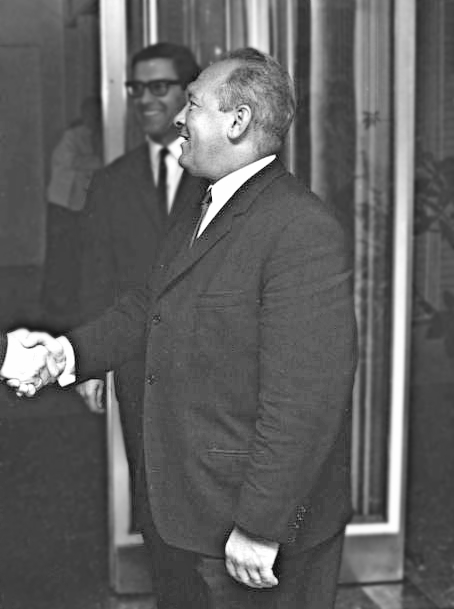
Zlatko (Čik) Čajkovski

In the summer of 1981, AEK Athens were in the midst of radical changes, as the club's owner, Loukas Barlos left and the ownership passed to Andreas Zafiropoulos. At the same time, the manager of the club, Miltos Papapostolou was released and Hans Tilkowski was hired in his place. The German manager's unfamiliarity with Greek football led the club to appoint an assistant with knowledge and experience of Greek football and the club itself, a role given to Nestoridis. The course of the team was disappointing and they were left behind in the standings, which resulted in Tilkowski being sacked and replaced by the winner of the 1978 domestic double, Zlatko Čajkovski. Nestoridis remained as the assistant of the new manager, being the connecting link between the previous and the current technical leadership, while also handling the situation in the team's locker rooms. The Čajkovski-Nestoridis duo improved the situation leading AEK to an eventual 4th-place finish, five points from the top. However, the return of Čajkovski did not resemble his first spell at the club. In the summer of 1982, AEK were preparing for the upcoming season under Čajkovski and Nestoridis, while Michalis Arkadis took over as the club's president. As the season progressed, the relationship between the technical leadership and the management became increasingly strained, with Čajkovski showing that his advanced age made him lose his ambition for the team. In all this confusion, Nestoridis tried to maintain the balances within the team. Eventually, on 9 January 1983, AEK were defeated by 3–2 at home against OFI, while the memory of the 5-goal defeat at the hands of PAOK at Toumba Stadium three matchdays ago was still fresh. Dissatisfaction with Čajkovski was evident, and he was removed from the team's bench, with Nestoridis taking over as head coach. However, his tenure was temporary, as Helmut Senekowitsch was hired about forty days later. Meanwhile Nestoridis had made three wins and two draws in the away matches and delivered the club in the second place with close distance from the top. The hiring of the Austrian manager, made him feel rather sidelined, which made him temporarily resign from the technical staff.

The following summer, a series of reshuffles at the management of AEK took place, Zafiropoulos assigned the management of the club to Lefteris Panagidis. The Cypriot businessman who was a connoisseur and a fan of English football hired the British John Barnwell as manager. Barnwell stayed on the yellow-black bench for just 12 matches and the recently fired Senekowitsch was called as his replacement. The second spell of "Seki" lasted for only eight games, scoring just two wins. After two consecutive home draws, the contract of the Austrian manager was also terminated and on February 1984 Nestoridis was called to take action in the technical leadership of the club. He remained on the team's bench until the summer and achieving five wins, one draw and four defeats, where AEK finished at the 7th place, recording one of their worst performances in the league.

== Personal life and death ==
Nestoridis lived in Kallithea with his wife, Eleni and their sons, Panagiotis, Antonis and Giorgos, who maintained the family's Pro-Po business. In the 1963 Greek legislative election, he ran unsuccessfully for parliament in the Athens B constituency with the Progressive Party of Spyros Markezinis, but he wasn't elect.

In June 2017, Nestoridis opened his football academies, under the name Nestoras FC.

He had health problems and avoided publicity. On 16 March 2022, he tested positive for COVID-19 and was hospitalized at Sotiria General Hospital, from where he attempted to escape, but he recovered and got out five days later.

On 30 September 2022, he attended the inauguration of the Agia Sophia Stadium, where he was honored. His wax figure is displayed in the new Agia Sophia Stadium museum alongside wax figures of other people who have been associated with AEK in various capacities. His name is also honoured on one of the four pillars of the stadium, alongside other important figures of the club's history such as Stelios Serafidis, Mimis Papaioannou and Thomas Mavros.

In November 2023, he was hospitalized after a fall at his home and was hospitalized again on 18 November.

Nestoridis died on the morning of 12 December 2023 at the age of 93 after suffering from health problems in his final years. On 16 December, his remains lay in state at the Church of the Holy Trinity next to Agia Sophia Stadium, before his funeral at Kallithea Cemetery.

== Style of play ==
"All the great players I saw, including Di Stéfano, Puskás and Pelé, did things humanly. What I saw Nestoridis doing is neither taught nor learned."

— Ljubiša Broćić on Nestoridis.

From a young age, Nestoridis, despite being largely self-taught, was noted for his natural technical ability and exceptional ball control. Contemporary accounts describe him as a highly skillful and creative forward, capable of beating defenders with close control, sudden bursts of acceleration and feints. His trademark element was his body flexibility and especially his pronounced waist movement, which allowed him to feint and dribble past opponents effectively. His playing style combined balance, agility and precision, allowing him to execute difficult movements and finishes with consistency. Nestoridis was particularly renowned for his set-piece ability. He was a specialist in free-kicks and corner kicks, having scored 17 goals from direct corner kicks.

He was also known for his confidence and insight, reportedly announcing in advance how he would maneuver, shoot and score, which further contributed to his reputation among his supporters and opponents. His fame inspired the laïko musician, Vangelis Perpiniadis, who despite being a supporter of Olympiacos, to write and perform a popular song of the time dedicated to him.

== Career statistics ==
=== Club ===
Appearances and goals by club, season and competition
Club	Season	League (Note: Also includes play-off matches.)			AFCA League		Cup (Note: Includes Greek Cup, Australia Cup)		Continental (Note: Also includes Balkans Cup.)		Total	
Club	Season	Division	Apps	Goals	Apps	Goals	Apps	Goals	Apps	Goals	Apps	Goals
Panionios	1948–49	Panhellenic Championship	0	0	4	2	0	0	0	0	4	2
Panionios	1949–50	Panhellenic Championship	0	0	14	4	1	1	0	0	15	5
Panionios	1950–51	Panhellenic Championship	3	0	9	7	2	0	0	0	14	7
Panionios	1951–52	Panhellenic Championship	0	0	10	4	7	1	0	0	17	5
Panionios	1952–53	Panhellenic Championship	0	0	8	5	2	0	0	0	10	5
Panionios	1953–54	Panhellenic Championship	0	0	10	3	4	3	0	0	14	6
Panionios	1954–55	Panhellenic Championship	0	0	5	1	3	3	0	0	8	4
AEK Athens	1955–56	Panhellenic Championship	0	0	0	0	0	0	0	0	0	0
AEK Athens	1956–57	Panhellenic Championship	0	0	0	0	0	0	0	0	0	0
AEK Athens	1957–58	Panhellenic Championship	22	11	11	8	4	2	0	0	37	21
AEK Athens	1958–59	Panhellenic Championship	18	21	8	4	5	1	0	0	31	26
AEK Athens	1959–60	Alpha Ethniki	28	32	—		6	10	0	0	34	42
AEK Athens	1960–61	Alpha Ethniki	28	27	—		5	13	4	4	37	44
AEK Athens	1961–62	Alpha Ethniki	29	29	—		1	0	0	0	30	29
AEK Athens	1962–63	Alpha Ethniki	30	24	—		3	4	0	0	33	28
AEK Athens	1963–64	Alpha Ethniki	24	10	—		3	4	2	1	29	15
AEK Athens	1964–65	Alpha Ethniki	26	17	—		2	2	2	1	30	20
AEK Athens	1965–66	Alpha Ethniki	3	1	—		0	0	0	0	3	1
South Melbourne Hellas (loan)	1966	Victorian State League	20	21	—		0	0	—		20	21
Vyzas Megara	1966–67	Alpha Ethniki	2	0	—		0	0	0	0	2	0
South Melbourne Hellas	1967	Victorian State League	17	12	—		0	0	—		17	12
Aias Salamina	1967–68	Beta Ethniki	7	2	—		0	0	0	0	7	2
Career total			257	207	79	38	48	44	8	6	392	295

=== International ===
Appearances and goals by national team and year
National team	Year	Apps	Goals
Greece	1951	1	0
Greece	1955	1	0
Greece	1956	1	0
Greece	1957	6	2
Greece	1958	2	0
Greece	1959	1	0
Greece	1960	3	0
Greece	1962	1	1
Total		17	3

Scores and results list Greece's goal tally first, score column indicates score after each Nestoridis goal.

List of international goals scored by Kostas Nestoridis
No.	Date	Venue	Opponent	Score	Result	Competition
1	5 October 1957	Leoforos Alexandras Stadium, Athens, Greece	France	2–1	2–1	1958 Mediterranean Cup
2	10 November 1957	Partizan Stadium, Belgrade, Yugoslavia	Yugoslavia	1–3	1–4	1958 FIFA World Cup qualification
3	18 October 1962	Leoforos Alexandras Stadium, Athens, Greece	Ethiopia	2–0	3–2	Friendly

== Honours ==
Panionios

- Athens FCA Championship: 1951

AEK Athens

- Greek Cup: 1955–56, 1963–64, 1965–66
- Alpha Ethniki: 1962–63

South Melbourne

- Victorian State League: 1966

Individual

- Athens FCA Championship top scorer: 1951
- Greek Championship top scorer: 1958–59, 1959–60, 1960–61 1961–62, 1962–63
- Greek Cup top scorer: 1959–60, 1960–61
- Victorian State League top scorer: 1966

== Records ==
- Most Greek championship top scorer awards: five (from 1959 to 1963, shared with Antonis Antoniadis)
- Most consecutive Greek championship top scorer awards: five (from 1959 to 1963)
