= Anastasios Kritikos (footballer, born 1914) =

Greek footballer (1914–?)

Tasos Kritikos
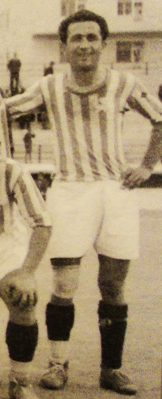
- Kritikos with Panathinaikos

Personal information
- Full name: Anastasios Kritikos
- Date of birth: 1914
- Place of birth: Plaka, Athens, Greece
- Positions: Midfielder; defender

Youth career
- 1925–1926: Esperos Kallitheas
- 1926–1928: Kallithaikos
- 1928–1930: Argonaftes Kallithea
- 1930–1931: Panionios
- 1931–1932: AEK Athens

Senior career*
Years	Team	Apps	(Gls)
1932–1933	AEK Athens	16	(3)
1933–1949	Panathinaikos	41	(22)
Total		57	(25)

International career
1934–1938	Greece	8	(0)
- * Club domestic league appearances and goals

Anastasios Kritikos (Greek: Αναστάσιος Κρητικός; 1914–?) was a Greek footballer who played as a midfielder.

== Club career ==
Kritikos began his football career at Esperos Kallitheas in 1925, where he played for a year before moving to Kallithaikos. In 1928 he signed for Argonaftes Kallithea and in 1930 he moved to the Athens' second division club, Panionios. There, he was spotted by people of AEK Athens which resulted in his transfer to the club in 1931.

Kritikos made his first appearance for the senior team in 1932. In 1933, he signed for Panathinaikos, but without the approval of AEK and thus he was punished with a two-year ban from football, as it was applied at the time. He played for the "greens" until 1949, where in 41 appearances for the Panhellenic Championship he scored 22 goals, while he scored another 24 goals for the Athens FCA Championship and 1 for the Greek Cup. He was one of the team's top players during the years of the Axis occupation of Greece, when the team faced great difficulties. In the spring of 1942, he was the captain of Panathinaikos during the friendly match against AEK, with the incomes would be given to the patients of the Sotiria hospital. After the Germans' refusal to allocate match incomes for this purpose, the captains of the teams, him and Kleanthis Maropoulos, went to the stands, conveying the protests to the fans, who erupted into incidents against the conquerors.

== International career ==
Kritikos made eight appearances for the Greece national team from 1934 to 1938. He was also part of Greece's team for their qualification matches for the 1938 FIFA World Cup.

== Honours ==
Panathinaikos

- Panhellenic Championship: 1948–49
- Greek Cup: 1931–32, 1947–48
- Athens FCA League: 1934, 1937, 1939, 1949
