= 1944–45 Panhellenic Championship =

Abandoned season of top-tier football league in Greece

Panhellenic Championship
- Season: 1944–45
- Champions: none
- Relegated: none

The 1944–45 Panhellenic Championship was intended to be the first top division tournament to take place after WW2, but was not held, due to the big delay and the eventual abandonment of the Athenian championship. Greece was liberated, so the HFF made the decision to start the regional championships again. The Athenian championship started with the participation of 8 teams, but was not completed because of disputes between Panathinaikos and the Athenian Association over the illegal usage of one of the footballers of Panionios, Giannakakos, in April 1945. As a result, Panathinaikos was expelled from the championship and had a 15-day ban from any sports activity, according to the decision made by the Athenian Association and HFF. Panathinaikos was not keen on the decision, so he refused to participate in any official competition of that season. The championship started with a big delay, in October 1945 and ended in mid-December, when it was abandoned.

Despite the non-conduction of the Panhellenic Championship, a tournament called "Freedom Cup" was held in April 1945 with a format of 2 groups of a total of 14 teams from Athens and Piraeus. Eventually, the tournament failed to finish as well in July 1945, because the finals of both groups were not able to be completed for various reasons, so the titles were not awarded, as provided in the announcement of the tournament. The point system was: Win: 3 points - Draw: 2 points - Loss: 1 point.

== Qualification round ==
=== Athens Football Clubs Association ===
Pos	Team	Pld	GF	GA	GD	Pts
1	AEK Athens	6	30	5	+25	17
2	Fostiras	6	13	11	+2	14
3	Enosi Pangrati	6	11	13	-2	12
4	Panionios	6	16	13	+3	11
5	Atlas Thymarakia	6	8	15	-7	10
6	Olympiacos Athens	6	8	31	-23	8

Panathinaikos refused to participate in the championship due to previous disputes with the Athenian Association. 5 other teams joined with them: Apollon Athens, Atromitos, Athinaikos, Asteras Athens and Arion Kolonaki. The Athenian Association replaced those teams in order for the championship to take place. The championship started in October 1945. After the start of the second round, in December, Panathinaikos resolved their differences with the Athenian Association and decided to return to the championship, along with the other 5 clubs. However, the championship was abandoned due to the delay in getting it restarted, as the Athenian Association deemed there was insufficient time for the competition to be completed.

=== Piraeus Football Clubs Association ===
Not played.

=== Macedonia Football Clubs Association ===
Not played.

== Final round ==
Not held.

== See also ==
- 1945 Freedom Cup (In Greek)
