= 1942–43 Panhellenic Championship =

Abandoned season of top-tier football league in Greece

Panhellenic Championship
- Season: 1942–43
- Champions: none
- Relegated: none

The 1942–43 Panhellenic Championship did not occur due to the repetitive disputes in the Greek Football organisation. The Union of Greek Athletes (Greek: Ένωση Ελλήνων Αθλητών) started a League in Athens and Piraeus under the supervision of the German Occupation army. During that period HFF had disbanded, so the Union of Greek Athletes decided to organize the 1942–43 Panhellenic Championship. The championship started in January 1943 and the games were held at Kaisariani. After short time the championship stopped, because of HFF having been re-established and taken over Greek Football organisation. At that point AEK Athens were leading the championship having won three out of their first four games.

The point system was: Win: 3 points - Draw: 2 points - Loss: 1 point.

AEK Athens' matches
Team 1	Score	Team 2
AEK Athens	3–1	Proodeftiki
AEK Athens	2–1	Apollon Athens
AEK Athens	1–2	Olympiacos
AEK Athens	4–1	Panathinaikos

HFF and UoGA disagreed on whether the event held so far should be considered as official or not, so the championship restarted. Known results of AEK Athens:

AEK Athens' matches
Team 1	Score	Team 2
AEK Athens	6–0	Atromitos
AEK Athens	12–1	Arion Kolonaki
AEK Athens	3–1	Ethnikos Piraeus
AEK Athens	4–0	AΟ Pangrati
AEK Athens	1–1	Asteras Athens
AEK Athens	8–2	Thiseus
AEK Athens	9–3	Amyna Ampelokipoi

The championship was abandoned once more, due to disagreement between the HFF and the UoGA. At that time AEK Athens were leading the league with a record of:

Pos	Team	Pld	W	D	L	GF	GA	GD	Pts
1	AEK Athens	7	6	1	0	43	8	+35	20

Source: rsssf
