= 1941–42 Panhellenic Championship =

Abandoned season of top-tier football league in Greece

Panhellenic Championship
- Season: 1941–42
- Champions: none
- Relegated: none

The 1941–42 Panhellenic Championship did not occur due to the events of the WW2 and the Axis occupation of Greece. That season was marked as the one with the least sports activity during the years of The Occupation. The Union of Greek Athletes was substantially re-established in 1942, with track and field athletes on the front line, with fundraising, food, healthcare and monitoring being their main activities, helping the needy, the suffering and the tuberculosis patients, who were hospitalized at "Sotiria". Nevertheless, its role enlarged in the second half of 1942 when football joined in.

Despite the Panhellenic Championship not being held, it's known for sure that 2 friendly games were organized. The first was between Olympiacos and Ethnikos Piraeus, which ended 4–0 and the second that eventually was not held, but was remembered for the events that took place afterwards. In the spring of 1942, the Union of Greek Athletes arranged a friendly match between Panathinaikos and AEK Athens, at the German-controlled Leoforos Alexandras Stadium, which was attended by approximately 15,500 spectators. The players requested from the then president of Panathinaikos, Apostolos Nikolaidis, that part of the income be allocated to the tuberculosis patients of the "Sotiria" hospital. Following his refusal and his announcement that the Germans had appointed an Austrian officer of the German army as referee, the players decided not to play, considering this an act of compliance with the conquerors. The players of both clubs entered the pitch together, greeted the fans and went up to the stands explaining to the crowd the situation. The fans, enraged, invaded the pitch, causing extensive damage. The incidents escalated into an anti-fascist demonstration that reached Omonia Square, before being dispersed by German forces.
