= 1954–55 Panhellenic Championship =

19th season of top-tier football league in Greece

Panhellenic Championship
- Season: 1954–55
- Champions: Olympiacos; 11th Greek title
- Relegated: none
- European Cup: Olympiacos
- Matches played: 30
- Goals scored: 113 (3.77 per match)
- Top goalscorer: Filippos Asimakopoulos (8 goals)
- Biggest home win: Olympiacos 6–0 Panetolikos; Panathinaikos 8–2 Olympiacos Volos; PAOK 7–1 Panetolikos
- Biggest away win: Apollon Athens 0–3 PAOK; Olympiacos Volos 1–4 Panetolikos; Panetolikos 0–3 Apollon Athens
- Highest scoring: Panathinaikos 8–2 Olympiacos Volos
- Longest winning run: Olympiacos
- Longest unbeaten run: Olympiacos (10 Matches)

The 1954–55 Panhellenic Championship was the 19th season of the highest football league of Greece. Olympiacos won their 11th championship (2 consecutive) unbeaten having 19 wins out of 20 total games and only one draw against Panathinaikos.

The 6 clubs that participated in the final stage were as follows:

- Athenian Championship: The first 2 teams of the ranking.
- Piraeus' Championship: The champion.
- Macedonian Championship: The champion.
- Regional Championship: The 2 winners (North and South group).

The qualifying round matches took place from 10 October 1954 to 13 February 1955, while the final phase took place from 20 February to 17 July 1955. The point system was: Win: 3 points - Draw: 2 points - Loss: 1 point.

== Qualification round ==
=== Athens Football Clubs Association ===
Pos	Team	Pld	W	D	L	GF	GA	GD	Pts	Qualification	PAO	APOL	AEK	PGSS	AST	EGA	FOS	ESP
1	Panathinaikos (Q)	14	9	5	0	28	8	+20	37 (Note: 1st place ranking match: Panathinaikos–Apollon Athens 1–0.)	Final round		1–1	3–0	3–2	1–1	2–1	4–1	2–0
2	Apollon Athens (Q)	14	10	3	1	30	10	+20	37	Final round	1–1		2–0	4–1	2–0	2–1	3–0	2–1
3	AEK Athens	14	9	1	4	26	13	+13	33		1–3	1–0		3–0	2–0	2–0	4–0	3–0
4	Panionios	14	5	5	4	19	19	0	29		0–0	2–2	0–2		0–0	1–1	2–1	3–0
5	Asteras Athens	14	2	7	5	8	14	−6	25		0–2	0–1	1–0	0–2		0–0	0–0	3–1
6	Egaleo	14	2	4	8	13	21	−8	22 (Note: 6th place ranking match: Egaleo–Fostiras 3–0.)		1–1	0–1	1–2	0–2	2–2		1–0	4–2
7	Fostiras	14	3	2	9	10	27	−17	22		0–2	0–4	1–4	0–1	0–0	2–1		4–1
8	Esperos Kallitheas	14	1	3	10	14	36	−22	19		1–5	0–3	2–2	2–2	1–1	2–0	0–1	

Source: rsssf
(Q) Qualified for the phase indicated

=== Piraeus Football Clubs Association ===
Pos	Team	Pld	W	D	L	GF	GA	GD	Pts	Qualification	OLY	ETH	ATR	AEN	ARIS	PAN
1	Olympiacos (Q)	10	10	0	0	41	8	+33	30	Final round		4–2	5–1	3–0	6–1	4–0
2	Ethnikos Piraeus	10	6	1	3	25	15	+10	23		1–3		4–1	3–0	5–1	2–1
3	Atromitos Piraeus	10	3	2	5	13	21	−8	18 (Note: 3rd place ranking matches: Atromitos Piraeus–AE Nikaia 2–2, 2–2, 1–0.)		1–3	2–3		2–1	2–0	2–0
4	AE Nikaia	10	3	2	5	10	20	−10	18		1–6	1–4	3–0		1–0	1–1
5	Aris Piraeus	10	2	2	6	9	26	−17	16		1–6	2–1	1–1	1–1		2–1
6	Panelefsiniakos	10	1	3	6	6	14	−8	15		0–1	0–0	1–1	0–1	2–0	

Source: rsssf
(Q) Qualified for the phase indicated

=== Macedonia Football Clubs Association ===
Pos	Team	Pld	W	D	L	GF	GA	GD	Pts	Qualification	PAOK	APOL	ARIS	MAK	IRA	POX
1	PAOK (Q)	10	8	2	0	28	7	+21	28	Final round		4–2	2–1	7–0	2–1	4–1
2	Apollon Kalamarias	10	8	0	2	27	12	+15	26		0–1		4–1	5–0	2–0	4–2
3	Aris	10	3	3	4	21	21	0	19		0–0	1–3		3–1	3–3	4–0
4	Makedonikos	10	1	5	4	12	26	−14	17		1–1	1–3	2–2		1–1	2–2
5	Iraklis	10	2	3	5	19	19	0	17		1–3	0–1	4–1	1–1		5–1
6	P.O. Xirokrini	10	1	1	8	15	37	−22	13		0–4	2–3	2–5	1–3	4–3	

Source: rsssf
(Q) Qualified for the phase indicated

=== Regional Championship ===
==== South Group ====
Pos	Team	Pld	W	D	L	GF	GA	GD	Pts	Qualification	PAN	ACH	PRO
1	Panetolikos (Q)	4	4	0	0	9	2	+7	12	Final round		2–1	3–0
2	Achilleas Korinth	4	2	0	2	6	6	0	8		1–3		2–0
3	Propontida Chalkidas	4	0	0	4	1	8	−7	4		0–1	1–2	

Source: rsssf
(Q) Qualified for the phase indicated

==== North Group ====
Pos	Team	Pld	W	D	L	GF	GA	GD	Pts	Qualification	OLY	DOX
1	Olympiacos Volos (Q)	2	2	0	0	5	3	+2	6	Final round		3–2
2	Doxa Dramas	2	0	0	2	3	5	−2	2		1–2	

Source: rsssf
(Q) Qualified for the phase indicated
- The Thrace champion did not participate due to delay in the completion of the championship.

== Final round ==
=== League table ===
Pos	Team	Pld	W	D	L	GF	GA	GD	Pts	OLY	PAO	APOL	PAOK	OLV	PAN
1	Olympiacos (C)	10	9	1	0	28	9	+19	29		0–0	2–0	1–0	6–1	6–0
2	Panathinaikos	10	7	1	2	29	10	+19	25	1–2		4–1	3–2	8–2	4–0
3	Apollon Athens	10	6	0	4	18	15	+3	22	2–3	2–1		0–3	3–0	6–1
4	PAOK	10	5	0	5	21	13	+8	20	2–3	0–2	1–2		2–0	7–1
5	Olympiacos Volos	10	1	0	9	9	29	−20	12	1–2	1–4	0–1	1–2		2–0
6	Panetolikos	10	1	0	9	6	35	−29	12	2–3	0–2	0–3	0–2	2–1	

Source: rsssf
(C) Champions

== Top scorers ==
Rank	Player	Club	Goals
1	(Greece) Filippos Asimakopoulos	Panathinaikos	8
2	(Greece) Elias Yfantis	Olympiacos	7
2	(Greece) Michalis Sofianos	Panathinaikos	7
2	(Greece) Giorgos Kamaras	Apollon Athens	7
