= 1957–58 Panhellenic Championship =

22nd season of top-tier football league in Greece

Panhellenic Championship
- Season: 1957–58
- Champions: Olympiacos; 14th Greek title
- Relegated: none
- European Cup: Olympiacos
- Matches played: 132
- Goals scored: 373 (2.83 per match)
- Top goalscorer: Kostas Georgopoulos (15 goals)
- Biggest home win: Olympiacos 6–0 OFI
- Biggest away win: Apollon Kalamarias 1–5 Apollon Athens
- Highest scoring: Ethnikos Piraeus 7–2 PAOK; PAOK 6–3 OFI
- Longest winless run: OFI

The 1957–58 Panhellenic Championship was the 22nd season of the highest football league of Greece. Olympiacos won their 14th championship (5 consecutive) after an interesting race with AEK Athens and Panathinaikos.

Compared to the previous season, the teams that participated in the final phase of the championship increased by 2 (12 out of 10) and resulted as follows:

- Athenian Championship: The first 4 teams of the ranking.
- Piraeus' Championship: The first 3 teams of the ranking.
- Macedonian Championship: The first 3 teams of the ranking.
- Regional Championship: The 2 winners (North and South Group).

The qualifying round matches took place from 22 September 1957 to 15 January 1958, while the final phase took place from 19 January to 23 July 1958. The point system was: Win: 3 points - Draw: 2 points - Loss: 1 point.

== Qualification round ==
=== Athens Football Clubs Association ===
Pos	Team	Pld	W	D	L	GF	GA	GD	Pts	Qualification	APOL	AEK	PAO	PGSS	FOS	ATH	AST	EGA
1	Apollon Athens (Q)	14	11	1	2	41	17	+24	37	Final round		1–2	3–1	6–2	3–2	3–0	8–1	2–0
2	AEK Athens (Q)	14	10	2	2	30	14	+16	36	Final round	2–1		0–2	2–1	3–2	4–1	3–2	1–1
3	Panathinaikos (Q)	14	8	2	4	28	17	+11	32	Final round	2–3	0–1		4–1	3–2	2–1	4–0	2–1
4	Panionios (Q)	14	5	4	5	20	26	−6	28	Final round	1–1	0–5	2–0		2–1	1–1	2–1	3–1
5	Fostiras	14	2	7	5	17	22	−5	25		2–5	1–0	2–2	0–0		1–1	0–0	2–1
6	Athinaikos	14	1	8	5	9	19	−10	24		0–1	0–4	0–0	2–2	0–0		1–1	0–0
7	Asteras Athens	14	1	6	7	10	27	−17	22		1–2	1–1	0–2	1–0	1–1	0–0		0–0
8	Egaleo	14	1	4	9	12	25	−13	20		1–2	1–2	1–4	1–3	1–1	0–2	3–1	

Source: rsssf
(Q) Qualified for the phase indicated

=== Piraeus Football Clubs Association ===
Pos	Team	Pld	W	D	L	GF	GA	GD	Pts	Qualification	OLY	PRO	ETH	ATR	PAN	ARIS	AEN	FIL
1	Olympiacos (Q)	14	12	2	0	41	12	+29	40	Final round		3–2	2–1	2–1	2–1	3–2	4–1	3–0
2	Proodeftiki (Q)	14	8	5	1	34	13	+21	35	Final round	1–1		4–1	2–2	1–1	4–0	5–2	4–0
3	Ethnikos Piraeus (Q)	14	8	2	4	34	14	+20	32 (Note: 3rd place ranking match: Ethnikos Piraeus–Atromitos Piraeus 1–1. Ethnikos Piraeus was qualified due to better goal difference.)	Final round	1–3	0–1		2–2	1–1	7–0	3–0	2–1
4	Atromitos Piraeus	14	7	4	3	21	14	+7	32		1–1	0–1	0–1		3–0	1–0	1–0	2–1
5	Panelefsiniakos (Note: Panelefsiniakos has 2 defeats without a match and -2 points.)	14	3	4	7	14	22	−8	22		0–3	1–1	0–2	0–2 (Note: The match did not occur. Awarded 0–2 to Atromitos Piraeus.)		2–0	4–1	2–0
6	Aris Piraeus	14	3	2	9	13	36	−23	22		0–7	1–1	0–4	2–3	2–0 (Note: The match did not occur. Awarded 2–0 to Aris Piraeus.)		0–0	1–0
7	AE Nikaia	14	2	3	9	18	36	−18	21		1–4	0–2	0–5	1–1	4–2	1–3		6–1
8	Filathloi Nikaia	14	1	2	11	9	37	−28	18		0–3	1–5	0–4	1–2	0–0	3–2	1–1	

Source: rsssf
(Q) Qualified for the phase indicated

=== Macedonia Football Clubs Association ===
Pos	Team	Pld	W	D	L	GF	GA	GD	Pts	Qualification	APOL	IRA	PAOK	ARIS	THER	MAK
1	Apollon Kalamarias (Q)	10	6	3	1	18	8	+10	25	Final round		1–0	2–0	1–1	2–1	4–1
2	Iraklis (Q)	10	5	3	2	14	7	+7	23	Final round	0–0		2–1	0–1	1–1	3–0
3	PAOK (Q)	10	5	2	3	16	8	+8	22 (Note: 3rd place ranking match: PAOK–Aris 1–1. PAOK was qualified due to better goal difference.)	Final round	1–0	0–2		1–1	2–0	3–0
4	Aris	10	4	4	2	16	9	+7	22		1–1	1–1	0–2		3–0	6–1
5	Thermaikos	10	1	3	6	10	19	−9	15		1–4	1–2	1–1	0–2		2–2
6	Makedonikos	10	1	1	8	9	32	−23	13		2–3	1–3	0–5	2–0	0–3	

Source: rsssf
(Q) Qualified for the phase indicated

=== Regional Championship ===
==== South Group ====
Pos	Team	Pld	W	D	L	GF	GA	GD	Pts	Qualification	OFI	PAN	PNN	OLY
1	OFI (Q)	6	5	1	0	14	7	+7	17	Final round		3–1	4–3	1–0
2	Panachaiki	6	2	2	2	9	7	+2	12		2–2		3–0	1–1
3	Pannafpliakos	6	2	1	3	7	10	−3	11		1–2	1–0		1–0
4	Olympiacos Chalkidas	6	0	2	4	2	8	−6	8		0–2	0–2	1–1	

Source: rsssf
(Q) Qualified for the phase indicated

==== North Group ====
Pos	Team	Pld	W	D	L	GF	GA	GD	Pts	Qualification	DOX	ASP	NIK
1	Doxa Dramas (Q)	4	3	0	1	10	4	+6	10	Final round		5–1	2–1
2	Aspida Xanthi	4	2	1	1	7	9	−2	9		2–1		3–2
3	Niki Volos	4	0	1	3	4	8	−4	5		0–2	1–1	

Source: rsssf
(Q) Qualified for the phase indicated

== Final round ==
=== League table ===
Pos	Team	Pld	W	D	L	GF	GA	GD	Pts	Qualification
1	Olympiacos (C)	22	14	5	3	40	14	+26	55	Qualified for European Cup preliminary round
2	AEK Athens	22	11	9	2	39	19	+20	53	
3	Panathinaikos	22	12	7	3	35	19	+16	53	
4	Apollon Kalamarias	22	11	2	9	33	27	+6	46	
5	Panionios	22	9	5	8	35	32	+3	45	
6	Proodeftiki	22	9	3	10	32	33	−1	43	
7	Doxa Drama	22	7	6	9	30	32	−2	42	
8	PAOK	22	5	10	7	32	38	−6	42	
9	Apollon Athens	22	7	4	11	30	38	−8	40	
10	Iraklis	22	6	6	10	16	27	−11	40	
11	Ethnikos Piraeus (Note: Ethnikos Piraeus has 1 defeat without a match and -2 points.)	22	6	7	9	31	31	0	39	
12	OFI	22	1	4	17	20	63	−43	28	

Source: rsssf
(C) Champions

=== Results ===
Home \ Away	OLY	AEK	PAO	APK	PGSS	PRO	DOX	PAOK	APA	IRA	ETH	OFI
Olympiacos		0–0	0–1	2–0	2–0	2–0	5–1	0–1	1–0	1–1	4–1	6–0
AEK Athens	0–1		1–1	2–1	2–0	5–1	0–0	6–2	2–1	1–1	1–0	4–1
Panathinaikos	1–1	1–1		3–1	2–1	1–2	3–1	1–1	2–0	3–0	2–0	4–1
Apollon Kalamarias	1–2	0–2	1–1		0–2	1–2	0–1	2–1	1–5	2–1	4–1	4–0
Panionios	1–4	2–1	0–1	2–3		1–2	3–2	2–2	5–2	2–1	1–1	4–0
Proodeftiki	1–2	2–2	1–0	0–2	1–2		3–2	3–1	1–1	0–1	2–0 (Note: Suspended at 76th minute while the score was 2–0 for Proodeftiki. That remained as the final score.)	4–0
Doxa Drama	1–2	1–1	0–1	0–2	1–1	1–0		2–0	1–1	0–1	3–1	5–1
PAOK	1–0	1–1	2–2	0–2	1–1	3–1	1–1		2–3	5–1	0–0	6–3
Apollon Athens	1–2	1–2	2–3	0–2	1–3	2–1	2–0	0–0		2–1	0–1	2–0
Iraklis	0–0	0–1	2–0	0–3	0–1	2–1	0–2	0–0	0–0		1–1	1–0
Ethnikos Piraeus	2–2	1–1	0–0	0–1	2–0	0–2 (Note: Match suspended at 17th minute. Awarded 0–2 to Proodeftiki.)	2–2	7–2	5–0	0–1		3–0
OFI	0–1	1–3	1–2	0–0	1–1	2–2	2–3	0–0	3–4	2–1	2–3	

Source: rsssf
Legend: Blue = home team win; Yellow = draw; Red = away team win.

== Top scorers ==
Rank	Player	Club	Goals
1	(Greece) Kostas Georgopoulos	Panionios	21
2	(Greece) Kostas Nestoridis	AEK Athens	12
3	(Greece) Dimitris Theofanis	Panathinaikos	11
