= 1949–50 Panhellenic Championship =

Abandoned season of top-tier football league in Greece

Panhellenic Championship
- Season: 1949–50
- Champions: none
- Relegated: none

The 1949–50 Panhellenic Championship was not held, due to increased obligations of the Greek national team to qualify and participate in the Mediterranean Cup. Only the Athenian, Piraeus' and Macedonian championships were held, in which AEK Athens, Olympiacos and PAOK, respectively finished first. The point system was: Win: 3 points - Draw: 2 points - Loss: 1 point.

== Qualification round ==
=== Athens Football Clubs Association ===
Pos	Team	Pld	GF	GA	GD	Pts	Qualification
1	AEK Athens (Q)	18	37	16	+21	46	Final round
2	Panionios	18	39	26	+13	44	
3	Asteras Athens	18	34	20	+14	42	
4	Panathinaikos	18	40	20	+20	41	
5	Fostiras	18	30	27	+3	38	
6	Apollon Athens	18	36	27	+9	37	
7	Daphni Athens	18	28	26	+2	36	
8	Esperos Kallitheas	18	14	32	-18	28	
9	Aris Athens	18	14	44	-30	25	
10	Athinaikos	18	12	46	-34	22	

=== Piraeus Football Clubs Association ===
Pos	Team	Pld	GF	GA	GD	Pts	Qualification
1	Olympiacos (Q)	14	39	11	+28	38	Final round
2	Ethnikos Piraeus	14	34	10	+24	36	
3	Panelefsiniakos	14	27	17	+10	33	
4	Atromitos Piraeus	14	26	25	+1	28	
5	Proodeftiki	14	35	34	+1	26	
6	AE Nikaia	14	15	29	-14	24	
7	Argonaftis Piraeus	14	18	40	-22	22	
8	Thiseas Piraeus	14	11	39	-28	17	

=== Macedonia Football Clubs Association ===
Pos	Team	Pld	GF	GA	GD	Pts	Qualification
1	PAOK (Q)	10	25	17	+8	26	Final round
2	Iraklis	10	25	9	+16	24	

== Final round ==
Not played.

== See also ==
- Mediterranean Cup (men's football)
