= 1955–56 Panhellenic Championship =

20th season of top-tier football league in Greece

Panhellenic Championship
- Season: 1955–56
- Champions: Olympiacos; 12th Greek title
- Relegated: none
- Matches: 30
- Goals: 78 (2.6 per match)
- Top goalscorer: Lambis Kouikouridis (7 goals)
- Biggest home win: Olympiacos 3–1 Aris; Ethnikos Piraeus 2–0 Apollon Athens; Panathinaikos 3–1 PAOK; Panathinaikos 2–0 Aris; PAOK 4–2 Aris
- Biggest away win: Aris 0–2 Ethnikos Piraeus
- Highest scoring: Apollon Athens 4–3 Ethnikos Piraeus
- Longest winless run: Aris (10 Matches)

The 1955–56 Panhellenic Championship was the 20th season of the highest football league of Greece and an exceptionally interesting championship, since 5 out of the 6 teams were challenging for the title until the final fixture, while Aris was left behind from the beginning. In the end Olympiacos won their 12th championship (3 consecutive) although he started with 4 consecutive draws.

Before the final stage, in that year, they were two qualification stages. Initially from the groups of the "founding" associations the results were as follows:

- Athenian Championship: The first 3 teams of the ranking.
- Piraeus' Championship: The first 2 teams of the ranking.
- Macedonian Championship: The first 2 teams of the ranking.

Subsequently, 3 new groups were created with geographical criteria where a total of 14 teams participated. The 7 came from the 3 founding associations and the other 7 came from the winners of the regional championships of the same number. Finally, the teams that participated in the final phase of the championship resulted as follows:

- North Group: The first 2 teams of the ranking.
- Central Group: The first 2 teams of the ranking.
- South Group: The first 2 teams of the ranking.

The point system was: Win: 3 points - Draw: 2 points - Loss: 1 point.

== Qualification round ==
=== Athens Football Clubs Association ===
Pos	Team	Pld	W	D	L	GF	GA	GD	Pts	Qualification	PAO	FOS	APOL	PGSS	AEK	ATH	EGA	AST
1	Panathinaikos (Q)	14	13	1	0	37	7	+30	41	Central Group		1–0	1–0	1–0	2–1	4–1	4–0	1–0
2	Fostiras (Q)	14	5	5	4	15	13	+2	29 (Note: 2nd place ranking match:Apollon Athens didn't show up for the match and was awarded 2–0 to Fostiras.)	Central Group	1–1		0–0	3–1	1–0	1–1	3–1	2–0
3	Apollon Athens (Q)	14	5	5	4	17	15	+2	29	Central Group	1–3	1–0		0–3	2–1	5–0	0–0	1–0
4	Panionios	14	5	4	5	23	21	+2	28		0–3	1–2	3–3		1–1	3–2	4–2	3–0
5	AEK Athens	14	4	3	7	15	19	−4	25 (Note: 5–7 place ranking match: AEK Athens–Athinaikos 3–2, AEK Athens–Egaleo 1–0, Athinaikos–Egaleo 3–1.)		1–4	4–1	1–1	1–2		1–0	1–0	1–0
6	Athinaikos	14	4	3	7	14	25	−11	25		2–5	1–0	2–0	0–0	2–0		1–1	1–0
7	Egaleo (Note: Egaleo have -1 point.)	14	4	4	6	12	26	−14	25		0–1	0–0	0–2 (Note: The initial 2–1 was canceled. Awarded 0–2 to Apollon Athens)	2–1	2–2	3–0		4–1
8	Asteras Athens	14	2	3	9	7	24	−17	21		0–6	1–1	1–1	1–1	1–0	2–1	0–1	

Source: rsssf
Legend: Blue = home team win; Yellow = draw; Red = away team win.
(Q) Qualified for the phase indicated

=== Piraeus Football Clubs Association ===
Pos	Team	Pld	W	D	L	GF	GA	GD	Pts	Qualification	OLY	ETH	PRO	ATR	DOX	PAN	ARIS	AEN
1	Olympiacos (Q)	14	11	1	2	51	11	+40	37	South Group		1–1	4–1	7–0	3–0	1–0	6–1	10–1
2	Ethnikos Piraeus (Q)	14	8	4	2	31	16	+15	34	South Group	0–2		3–1	3–1	0–0	3–0	3–0	1–0
3	Proodeftiki	14	8	2	4	30	19	+11	32		2–0 (Note: Match didn't occur. Awarded 2–0 to Proodeftiki.)	2–2		6–1	2–0	3–1	2–1	3–1
4	Atromitos Piraeus	14	6	3	5	23	32	−9	29		2–0 (Note: Match didn't occur. Awarded 2–0 to Atromitos Piraeus.)	5–3	1–0		4–1	0–0	3–2	1–1
5	Doxa Piraeus	14	5	3	6	22	28	−6	27		1–7	2–3	1–4	5–1		2–0	3–2	2–0
6	Panelefsiniakos	14	4	2	8	13	22	−9	24		0–3	1–3	2–0	2–1	0–3		2–1	0–0
7	Aris Piraeus	14	2	4	8	18	30	−12	22		1–2	1–1	2–2	1–1	2–2	2–1		1–0
8	AE Nikaia	14	1	3	10	7	37	−30	19		1–5	0–5	0–2	1–2	0–0	0–4	2–1	

Source: rsssf
Legend: Blue = home team win; Yellow = draw; Red = away team win.
(Q) Qualified for the phase indicated

=== Macedonia Football Clubs Association ===
Pos	Team	Pld	W	D	L	GF	GA	GD	Pts	Qualification	PAOK	ARIS	IRA	APOL	MAK	POX
1	PAOK (Q)	10	9	1	0	31	6	+25	29	North Group		4–1	5–1	1–0	3–0	2–1
2	Aris (Q)	10	7	1	2	28	11	+17	25	North Group	0–1		2–2	3–1	3–1	3–0
3	Iraklis	10	4	2	4	19	17	+2	20		2–2	0–2		3–1	5–0	3–1
4	Apollon Kalamarias	10	4	1	5	16	15	+1	19		1–3	1–2	2–0		2–1	4–0
5	Makedonikos	10	2	2	6	13	20	−7	16		0–1	0–4	1–0	2–2		8–0
6	P.O. Xirokrini	10	0	1	9	4	42	−38	11		0–9	1–8	1–3	0–2	0–0	

Source: rsssf
Legend: Blue = home team win; Yellow = draw; Red = away team win.
(Q) Qualified for the phase indicated

== Semi–final round ==
=== North Group ===
Pos	Team	Pld	W	D	L	GF	GA	GD	Pts	Qualification	ARIS	PAOK	DOX	ORF
1	Aris (Q)	6	5	1	0	14	3	+11	17	Final round		1–0	3–1	4–0
2	PAOK (Q)	6	4	1	1	18	5	+13	15	Final round	1–1		4–0	4–1
3	Doxa Drama	6	1	1	4	8	13	−5	9		1–2	2–3		1–1
4	Orfeas Xanthi	6	0	1	5	2	21	−19	7		0–3	0–6	0–3	

Source: rsssf
Legend: Blue = home team win; Yellow = draw; Red = away team win.
(Q) Qualified for the phase indicated

=== Central Group ===
Pos	Team	Pld	W	D	L	GF	GA	GD	Pts	Qualification	PAO	APOL	NVL	FOS	OLY
1	Panathinaikos (Q)	8	7	1	0	17	3	+14	23	Final round		4–1	0–0	2–0	5–1
2	Apollon Athens (Q)	8	5	1	2	20	11	+9	19	Final round	0–1		1–0	1–0	5–1
3	Niki Volos	8	4	2	2	7	5	+2	18		1–2	1–1		1–0	2–1
4	Fostiras	8	1	0	7	7	16	−9	10		0–1	3–6	0–1		0–1
5	Olympiacos Chalkida	8	1	0	7	8	24	−16	10		0–2	1–5	0–1	3–4	

Source: rsssf
Legend: Blue = home team win; Yellow = draw; Red = away team win.
(Q) Qualified for the phase indicated

=== South Group ===
Pos	Team	Pld	W	D	L	GF	GA	GD	Pts	Qualification	OLY	ETH	PAN	OFI	OLL
1	Olympiacos (Q)	8	8	0	0	26	3	+23	24	Final round		2–0	2–1	6–0	2–0
2	Ethnikos Piraeus (Q)	8	5	1	2	16	9	+7	19	Final round	0–1		2–2	1–0	5–1
3	Panachaiki	8	1	3	4	9	12	−3	13		0–1	0–1		2–2	1–2
4	OFI	8	1	2	5	10	20	−10	12		1–3	1–2	1–1		2–1
5	Olympiacos Loutraki (Note: Olympiacos Loutraki have -1 point.)	8	2	0	6	12	29	−17	11		1–9	2–5	1–2	4–3	

Source: rsssf
Legend: Blue = home team win; Yellow = draw; Red = away team win.
(Q) Qualified for the phase indicated

== Final round ==
=== League table ===
Pos	Team	Pld	W	D	L	GF	GA	GD	Pts	OLY	ETH	PAO	PAOK	APOL	ARIS
1	Olympiacos (C)	10	4	5	1	13	9	+4	23		0–0	2–1	0–0	2–1	3–1
2	Ethnikos Piraeus	10	4	4	2	12	8	+4	22 (Note: 2nd place ranking match: Panathinaikos withdrew. Awarded 2–0 to Ethnikos Piraeus.)	2–1		2–1	1–2	2–0	2–2
3	Panathinaikos	10	5	2	3	15	11	+4	22	0–0	1–1		3–1	1–0	2–0
4	PAOK	10	3	4	3	13	13	0	20 (Note: 4th place ranking match: PAOK–Apollon Athens 1–0.)	1–2	0–0	1–0		1–2	4–2
5	Apollon Athens	10	4	2	4	16	17	−1	20	2–2	4–3	1–2	2–2		2–1
6	Aris	10	0	3	7	9	20	−11	13	1–1	0–2	0–1	1–1	1–2	

Source: rsssf
Legend: Blue = home team win; Yellow = draw; Red = away team win.
(C) Champions

== Top scorers ==
Rank	Player	Club	Goals
1	(Greece) Lambis Kouikouridis	PAOK	7
2	(Greece) Christos Karaoulanis	Ethnikos Piraeus	6
3	(Greece) Vangelis Panakis	Panathinaikos	5
3	(Greece) Giannis Cholevas	Apollon Athens	5
