= 1950–51 Panhellenic Championship =

16th season of top-tier football league in Greece

Panhellenic Championship
- Season: 1950–51
- Champions: Olympiacos; 9th Greek title
- Relegated: none
- Matches: 14
- Goals: 19 (1.36 per match)
- Top goalscorer: Giorgos Darivas; Thanasis Bebis; Stelios Christopoulos (3 goals each)
- Biggest home win: Olympiacos 4–1 Iraklis
- Biggest away win: Iraklis 1–4 Olympiacos
- Highest scoring: Olympiacos 4–1 Iraklis; Iraklis 1–4 Olympiacos
- Longest winning run: Olympiacos (4 matches)
- Longest unbeaten run: Olympiacos (4 matches)

The 1950–51 Panhellenic Championship was the 16th season of the highest football league of Greece. The clubs that participated were the champions from the 3 founding football associations of the HFF: Athens, Piraeus and Macedonia.Olympiacos easily won the championship undefeated, winning all 14 games. The point system was: Win: 3 points - Draw: 2 points - Loss: 1 point.

== Qualification round ==
=== Athens Football Clubs Association ===
Pos	Team	Pld	GF	GA	GD	Pts	Qualification
1	Panionios (Q)	10	20	9	+11	26	Final round
2	AEK Athens	10	12	8	+4	22	
3	Panathinaikos	10	15	10	+5	21	
4	Apollon Athens	10	10	13	-3	18	
5	Asteras Athens	10	7	12	-5	17	
6	Fostiras	10	10	20	-10	16	

=== Piraeus Football Clubs Association ===
Pos	Team	Pld	GF	GA	GD	Pts	Qualification
1	Olympiacos (Q)	10	26	5	+11	27	Final round
2	Ethnikos Piraeus	10	21	7	+14	26	
3	Panelefsiniakos	10	11	16	-5	18	
4	Atromitos Piraeus	10	11	16	-5	18	
5	Prooderftiki	10	15	25	-10	16	
6	AE Nikaia	10	11	29	-18	15	

=== Macedonia Football Clubs Association ===
Pos	Team	Pld	GF	GA	GD	Pts	Qualification
1	Iraklis (Q)	10	21	9	+12	25	Final round
2	Makedonikos	10	28	17	+11	23	
3	PAOK	10	18	14	+4	22	
4	Aris	10	20	15	+5	20	
5	Megas Alexandros	10	10	24	-14	15	
6	P.O. Xirokrini	10	11	29	-18	15	

== Final round ==
=== League table ===
Pos	Team	Pld	W	D	L	GF	GA	GD	Pts	OLY	PGSS	IRA
1	Olympiacos	4	4	0	0	12	3	+9	12		3–1	4–1
2	Panionios	4	1	0	3	3	6	−3	6	0–1		2–0 (Note: Awarded 2–0 (w/o) to Panionios.)
3	Iraklis (Note: Iraklis has a defeat without a match and –1 point.)	4	1	0	3	4	10	−6	5	1–4	2–0	

Source: rsssf

== Top scorers ==
Rank	Player	Club	Goals
1	(Greece) Georgios Darivas	Olympiacos	3
1	(Greece) Thanasis Bebis	Olympiacos	3
1	(Greece) Stelios Christopoulos	Olympiacos	3
