= 1951–52 Panhellenic Championship =

Abandoned season of top-tier football league in Greece

Panhellenic Championship
- Season: 1951–52
- Champions: none
- Relegated: none

The 1951–52 Panhellenic Championship was not held, due to increased obligations of Greece to qualify and participate in the Olympic Games, the Mediterranean Games and for the Mediterranean Cup. Only the championships of Athens, Piraeus and Macedonia were held, in which Panathinaikos, Olympiacos and Iraklis finished first, respectively. The point system was: Win: 3 points - Draw: 2 points - Loss: 1 point.

== Qualification round ==
=== Athens Football Clubs Association ===
Pos	Team	Pld	GF	GA	GD	Pts	Qualification
1	Panathinaikos^{[a]} (Q)	10	17	11	+6	27^{[b]}	Final round
2	AEK Athens^{[a]}	10	23	13	+10	24	
3	Panionios	10	20	15	+5	22	
4	Fostiras	10	12	13	-1	19	
5	Apollon Athens	10	12	18	-6	16	
6	Asteras Athens	10	8	22	-14	15	

a. AEK Athens did not show in the championship play-off match, so Panathinaikos were declared champions.
b. The Athenian Federation added 3 points to Panathinakos for the victory without a match in the championship play-off against AEK Athens.

=== Piraeus Football Clubs Association ===
Pos	Team	Pld	GF	GA	GD	Pts	Qualification
1	Olympiacos (Q)	10	27	9	+18	28	Final round
2	Ethnikos Piraeus	10	20	15	+5	22	
3	AE Nikaia	10	11	19	-8	18^{[b]}	
4	Atromitos Piraeus	10	10	16	-6	18^{[b]}	
5	Proodeftiki	10	14	20	-6	17^{[c]}	
6	Panelefsiniakos	10	12	15	-3	17^{[c]}	

b. 3rd place ranking match: AE Nikaia–Atromitos Piraeus 5–3.
c. 5th place ranking match: Proodeftiki–Panelefsiniakos 2–0.

=== Macedonia Football Clubs Association ===
Pos	Team	Pld	GF	GA	GD	Pts	Qualification
1	Iraklis (Q)	10	—	—	—	26	Final round
2	Aris	10	—	—	—	25	

== Final round ==
Not played.

== See also ==
- Football at the 1951 Mediterranean Games
- Football at the Mediterranean Games
