= Esperos Kallitheas =

Esperos (in Greek: Π.Ο.Κ. Έσπερος) is a sports club in Kallithea (within greater Athens, Greece), founded in 1943 during the Nazi occupation of the country (1941–44).

P.O.K. Esperos logo.

== History ==
Started as a football club and participated during World War II in the games organised by the "Union of Greek Athletes" (founded by Gregoris Lambrakis) seeking finance in order to fund public messes for the starving population.

After the war the Esperos football team played in Division 1 for three periods (1948–49, 1949–50 and 1954–55) and in Division 2 most of the time. In year 1966 Esperos (football) was co-founder of Kallithea FC.

Since 1944, POK Esperos (the official name standing for Panathlitikos Omilos Kallitheas, Allsports Club of Kallithea) has also uninterruptedly participated in all national volleyball (men) and basketball (men) (Esperos Kallitheas B.C.) championships with 7 and 8 Division 1 participations respectively.

POK ESPEROS is a founding member of the Hellenic Basketball Federation (EOK), the Hellenic Volleyball Federation (EOΠE), the Hellenic Table Tennis Federation (EΦOEΠA) and also a member of the Hellenic Handball Federation (OXE).

== See also ==
- Esperos B.C.
