= 1953–54 Panhellenic Championship =

18th season of top-tier football league in Greece

Panhellenic Championship
- Season: 1953–54
- Champions: Olympiacos; 10th Greek title
- Relegated: none
- Matches played: 30
- Goals scored: 89 (2.97 per match)
- Top goalscorer: Christoforos Yientzis (7 goals)
- Biggest home win: Olympiacos 5–0 AEK Athens; Olympiacos 5–0 Niki Volos; PAOK 5–0 Panachaiki
- Biggest away win: Panachaiki 0–8 Olympiacos
- Highest scoring: Panachaiki 0–8 Olympiacos
- Longest winning run: Olympiacos
- Longest unbeaten run: Olympiacos (10 Matches)

The 1953–54 Panhellenic Championship was the 18th season of the highest football league of Greece. There was an important innovation, as in its final phase, teams from the Greek region participated in a single group for the first time, bypassing the "Athens - Piraeus - Thessaloniki" triptych. The opportunity to claim the title of champion of a provincial team, was given for the first time in the period 1938-39, but where the championship was held in 2 groups. Olympiacos won their 10th championship being unbeaten for the 5th time in their history.

The 6 clubs that participated in the final stage were as follows:

- Athenian Championship: The first 2 teams of the ranking.
- Piraeus' Championship: The champion.
- Macedonian Championship: The champion.
- Regional Championship: The 2 winners (North and South group).

The qualifying round matches took place from 10 October 1953 to 31 March 1954, while the final phase took place from 4 April to 21 July 1954. The point system was: Win: 3 points - Draw: 2 points - Loss: 1 point.

== Qualification round ==
=== Athens Football Clubs Association ===
Pos	Team	Pld	W	D	L	GF	GA	GD	Pts	Qualification	PAO	AEK	PGSS	APOL	FOS	AST
1	Panathinaikos (Q)	10	7	2	1	16	2	+14	26	Final round		1–0	2–0	1–0	5–0	2–0
2	AEK Athens (Q)	10	4	4	2	15	8	+7	22	Final round	0–0		2–1	1–2	4–0	3–1
3	Panionios	10	3	5	2	12	11	+1	21 (Note: 3rd place ranking match: Panionios–Apollon Athens 1–0.)		2–1	1–1		2–0	2–2	0–0
4	Apollon Athens	10	4	3	3	10	10	0	21		0–3	1–1	1–1		1–1	1–0
5	Fostiras	10	1	5	4	8	18	−10	17		0–1	1–1	1–1	0–2		2–0
6	Asteras Athens	10	0	3	7	3	15	−12	13		0–0	0–2	1–2	0–2	1–1	

Source: rsssf
(Q) Qualified for the phase indicated

=== Piraeus Football Clubs Association ===
Pos	Team	Pld	W	D	L	GF	GA	GD	Pts	Qualification	OLY	ETH	ATR	PAN	ARIS	AEN
1	Olympiacos (Q)	10	8	1	1	28	8	+20	27	Final round		3–1	3–0	2–0	5–0	5–1
2	Ethnikos Piraeus	10	4	3	3	11	9	+2	21 (Note: 2nd place ranking match: Ethnikos Piraeus–Atromitos Piraeus 3–0.)		1–1		2–0	2–0	2–0	2–1
3	Atromitos Piraeus	10	4	3	3	15	14	+1	21		3–1	1–1		1–0	1–1	2–1
4	Panelefsiniakos	10	4	1	5	13	14	−1	19		0–1	2–0	3–2		2–0	3–2
5	Aris Piraeus	10	2	3	5	9	21	−12	17		0–3	1–0	0–3	2–2		4–2
6	AE Nikaia	10	1	3	6	14	24	−10	15		2–4	0–0	2–2	2–1	1–1	

Source: rsssf
(Q) Qualified for the phase indicated

=== Macedonia Football Clubs Association ===
Pos	Team	Pld	W	D	L	GF	GA	GD	Pts	Qualification	PAOK	ARIS	MAK	POX	IRA	APOL
1	PAOK (Q)	10	9	1	0	30	10	+20	29	Final round		2–0	3–2	4–1	6–2	3–1
2	Aris	10	6	2	2	19	13	+6	24		1–1		2–1	3–0	2–1	3–2
3	Makedonikos	10	6	0	4	20	18	+2	22		1–4	3–1		3–0	2–0	2–0
4	P.O. Xirokrini	10	3	1	6	11	23	−12	17		0–1	2–4	1–4		3–2	2–1
5	Iraklis	10	3	0	7	18	21	−3	16		0–3	0–2	6–0	0–1		3–2
6	Apollon Kalamarias	10	0	2	8	11	24	−13	12		2–3	1–1	1–2	1–1	0–4	

Source: rsssf
(Q) Qualified for the phase indicated

=== Regional Championship ===
==== South Group ====
Pos	Team	Pld	W	D	L	GF	GA	GD	Pts	Qualification	PAN	PAL	ARIS
1	Panachaiki (Q)	4	3	0	1	8	3	+5	10	Final rund		4–1	2–1
2	Pallevadiaki	4	2	1	1	6	6	0	9		1–0		4–2
3	Aris Korinth	4	0	1	3	3	8	−5	5		0–2	0–0	

Source: rsssf
(Q) Qualified for the phase indicated

==== North Group ====
Pos	Team	Pld	W	D	L	GF	GA	GD	Pts	Qualification	NIK	DOX
1	Niki Volos (Q)	2	1	0	1	6	4	+2	4 (Note: Decider match: Niki Volos–Doxa Dramas 3–1.)	Final round		4–0
2	Doxa Dramas	2	1	0	1	4	6	−2	4		4–2	

Source: rsssf
(Q) Qualified for the phase indicated
Notes:
- The Thrace champion did not participate due to delay in the completion of the championship.

== Final round ==
=== League table ===
Pos	Team	Pld	W	D	L	GF	GA	GD	Pts	OLY	PAO	AEK	PAOK	NIK	PAN
1	Olympiacos (C)	10	8	2	0	33	3	+30	28		1–1	5–0	1–0	5–0	3–0
2	Panathinaikos	10	5	5	0	13	5	+8	25	1–1		2–0	1–1	1–0	3–0
3	AEK Athens	10	4	3	3	15	17	−2	21	0–4	1–1		3–1	3–1	3–0
4	PAOK	10	2	3	5	15	14	+1	17	1–2	0–1	2–2		1–2	5–0
5	Niki Volos	10	2	2	6	8	19	−11	16	0–3	0–1	0–0	2–2		2–1
6	Panachaiki	10	1	1	8	5	31	−26	13	0–8	1–1	1–3	0–2	2–1	

Source: rsssf
(C) Champions

== Top scorers ==
Rank	Player	Club	Goals
1	(Greece) Christoforos Yientzis	PAOK	7
2	(Greece) Babis Kotridis	Olympiacos	6
3	(Greece) Themis Moustaklis	Olympiacos	5
