= 1948–49 Panhellenic Championship =

15th season of top-tier football league in Greece

Panhellenic Championship
- Season: 1948–49
- Champions: Panathinaikos; 2nd Greek title
- Relegated: none
- Matches: 6
- Goals: 24 (4 per match)
- Top goalscorer: Vasilios Grigoriadis (4 goals)
- Biggest home win: Olympiacos 4–1 Aris
- Biggest away win: Aris 0–2 Panathinaikos
- Highest scoring: Aris 4–4 Olympiacos
- Longest winless run: Aris (4 matches)

The 1948–49 Panhellenic Championship was the 15th season of the highest football league of Greece. The clubs that participated were the champions from the 3 founding football associations of the HFF: Athens, Piraeus and Macedonia. Panathinaikos won the championship, due to a better goal ratio than Olympiacos. The point system was: Win: 3 points - Draw: 2 points - Loss: 1 point.

== Qualification round ==
=== Athens Football Clubs Association ===
Pos	Team	Pld	GF	GA	GD	Pts	Qualification
1	Panathinaikos (Q)	16	40	16	+24	41	Final round
2	Panionios	16	33	18	+15	39	
3	Fostiras	16	37	27	+10	36	
4	Apollon Athens	16	25	16	+9	36	
5	AEK Athens	16	28	16	+12	35	
6	Asteras Athens	16	16	28	-12	30	
7	Esperos Kallitheas	16	13	27	-14	27	
8	Daphni Athens	16	19	27	-12	26	
9	Athinaikos	16	6	41	-35	16	

=== Piraeus Football Clubs Association ===
Pos	Team	Pld	GF	GA	GD	Pts	Qualification
1	Olympiacos (Q)	14	49	13	+36	41	Final round
2	Ethnikos Piraeus	14	33	20	+13	34	
3	Panelefsiniakos	14	31	20	+11	32	
4	Atromitos Piraeus	14	28	27	+1	27	
5	Argonaftis Piraeus	14	19	20	-1	26	
6	Proodeftiki	14	24	24	0	22	
7	AE Nikaia	14	19	36	-17	22	
8	Aris Piraeus	14	18	61	-43	17	

=== Macedonia Football Clubs Association ===
Pos	Team	Pld	GF	GA	GD	Pts	Qualification
1	Aris (Q)	10	31	11	+20	25^{[a]}	Final round
2	PAOK	10	21	9	+12	25^{[a]}	
3	Iraklis	10	16	14	+2	21	
4	Makedonikos	10	3	15	-12	20	
5	Apollon Kalamarias	10	14	25	-11	16	
6	Megas Alexandros	10	8	29	-21	13	

a. Aris qualifies due to a better goal difference.

== Final round ==
=== League table ===
Pos	Team	Pld	W	D	L	GF	GA	GR	Pts	PAO	OLY	ARIS
1	Panathinaikos (Note: Panathinaikos were deducted 1 point.) (C)	4	3	0	1	7	4	1.750	9		3–2	2–0 (Note: Match suspended at 74th minute. Awarded 2–0 to Panathinaikos.)
2	Olympiacos	4	2	1	1	12	8	1.500	9	2–0 (Note: Match suspended at 80th minute. Awarded 2–0 to Olympiacos.)		4–1
3	Aris (Note: Aris were deducted 1 point.)	4	0	1	3	5	12	0.417	4	0–2	4–4	

Source: rsssf
(C) Champions

== Top scorers ==
Rank	Player	Club	Goals
1	(Greece) Vasilios Grigoriadis	Aris	4
2	(Greece) Stelios Christopoulos	Olympiacos	3
3	(Greece) Giannis Petsanas	Panathinaikos	2
3	(Greece) Alekos Chatzistavridis	Olympiacos	2
3	(Greece) Mimis Apostolopoulos	Olympiacos	2
