= 1987–88 AEK Athens F.C. season =

AEK Athens
1987–88 season
- Chairman: Andreas Zafiropoulos (until 16 May); Kostas Generakis (until 12 June); Stratos Gidopoulos
- Manager: Todor Veselinović
- Stadium: AEK Stadium
- Alpha Ethniki: 2nd
- Greek Cup: Round of 16
- Top goalscorer: League: Henrik Nielsen (21); All: Henrik Nielsen (23)
- Highest home attendance: 31,306 vs Olympiacos (31 January 1988)
- Lowest home attendance: 4,440 vs Kallithea (13 January 1988)
- Average home league attendance: 16,811
- Biggest win: AEK Athens 7–1 Veria
- Biggest defeat: Aris 4–1 AEK Athens; OFI 3–0 AEK Athens
Home colours	Away colours

The 1987–88 season was the 64th season in the existence of AEK Athens F.C. and the 29th consecutive season in the top flight of Greek football. They competed in the Alpha Ethniki and the Greek Cup. The season began on 6 September 1987 and finished on 15 May 1988.

== Kits ==
Supplier: Zita Hellas
Sponsor(s): Ethniki Asfalistiki

Home	Away

== Overview ==
In the summer of 1987, AEK returned to the Nea Filadelfeia Stadium and had to carry on without club legend, Thomas Mavros as well as Håkan Sandberg. On the other hand, some useful players were acquired such as Giorgos Savvidis, Henrik Nielsen and Vasilios Vasilakos. The Yugoslav Todor Veselinović was appointed as the new manager, who was familiar with Greek football with spells at Olympiacos, Apollon Athens and Diagoras.

Under Veselinović, the team performed well and remained in contention for the championship and with both Panathinaikos and Olympiacos out of the title race early on, AEK were the main contenders for the title, alongside the strong at that time AEL. However, the "Tsingov case" played a crucial role in the outcome of the Championship. The footballer of AEL, Georgi Tsingov tested positive in a doping test after the match against Panathinaikos. The court's decision was as the regulation predicted, awarding the match to their opponents, deducting two points from AEL and punishment of the player, which brought AEK at the top of the table. AEL appealed with their supporters protesting by blocking the highway, closing railway lines among other things. Before the appeal was heard the then Minister of Sports, Sifis Valirakis changed the regulation overnight. The new regulation dictated that in cases of doping, only the footballer would be punished and not the club. Thus, the points were returned to AEL who eventually won the championship. Essentially, AEK were entitled to win the championship on courts, but since AEL emerged as champions on the pitch, the principles of the yellow-blacks did not allow them to pursue the matter further in court.

In the Cup, AEK after eliminating Iraklis at the first round and Kallithea at the round of 32, were drawn against Olympiacos for the round of 16. In the first match at Karaiskakis Stadium, AEK got a significant 1–1 draw. On the eve of the rematch, a big scandal broke out as the former footballer of AEK, Dinos Ballis visited the hotel where the team were staying carrying a bouquet intended for the goalkeeper, Theologis Papadopoulos and raising strong suspicions that he was attempting to bribe him. The match took place, with Olympiacos winning 1–3 and the case proceeded to court. The Koskotas brothers were accused of trying to bribe Papadopoulos and Vasilakos through Ballis, while many fans of AEK believe that the management of AEK was involved in the whole case. Eventually, in what many considered a controversial verdict, Ballis was the only person convicted, being found guilty of attempted bribery.

Another scandal of the season was the "Vosdos case". The president of Panachaiki, Aris Loukopoulos, denounced AEK for an attempt to bribe their defender, Leonidas Vosdos, before the match between the two sides in Patras. The footballer himself stated that no one approached him and the judges concluded that the allegations were fabricated by Loukopoulos to create a climate of tension in view of the match. Thus the president of Panachaiki was punished.

The last match of the season at Nea Filadelfeia against Iraklis was marked by terrible incidents. The ultras' stand had grown frustrated with Zafiropoulos, who was considered unable to lift the "weight" of the club's management, but the tension that existed did not justify the following events. Riot police entered the ultras' stand, a decision that was heavily criticized and used force against those in the stand in their way. That resulted in heated encounters with the ultras, with many believing that Zafiropoulos had influenced the police officers to act in this way. The main players of the season for AEK were Manolas, Nielsen, Savvidis, Vasilakos, Janjanin and Patikas. The biggest victory of the season was the 7–1 home win against Veria. Henrik Nielsen finished the league season as top scorer with 21 goals.

== Management team ==
Position	Staff
Manager	(Socialist Federal Republic of Yugoslavia) Todor Veselinović
Assistant manager	(Greece) Giorgos Petridis
Goalkeeping coach	(Greece) Stelios Serafidis
Head of Medical	(Greece) Lakis Nikolaou

== Players ==
=== Squad information ===
NOTE: The players are the ones that have been announced by the AEK Athens' press release. No edits should be made unless a player arrival or exit is announced. Updated 15 May 1988, 23:59 UTC+3.

Player	Nat.	Position(s)	Date of birth (Age)	Signed	Previous club	Transfer fee	Contract until
Goalkeepers
Spyros Ikonomopoulos	(Greece)	GK	25 July 1959 (aged 28)	1979	(Greece) AEK Athens U20	—	1989
Theologis Papadopoulos	(Greece)	GK	12 January 1960 (aged 28)	1984	(Greece) AEL	₯9,000,000	1989
Fanis Kofinas	(Greece)	GK	5 September 1960 (aged 27)	1982	(Greece) Pelopas Kiato	Free	1992
Defenders
Makis Chatzis	(Greece)	RB / LB	30 March 1957 (aged 31)	1984	(Greece) Apollon Athens	₯6,750,000	1989
Takis Karagiozopoulos	(Greece)	CB / DM / ST	4 February 1961 (aged 27)	1981	(Greece) Veria	₯8,000,000	1991
Polyvios Chatzopoulos	(Greece)	CB / DM	17 July 1961 (aged 26)	1985	(Greece) Panionios	₯10,400,000	1990
Stelios Manolas (Captain)	(Greece)	CB / RB	13 July 1961 (aged 26)	1980	(Greece) AEK Athens U20	—	1989
Giorgos Peppes	(Greece)	CB	26 October 1961 (aged 26)	1986	(Greece) Ethnikos Piraeus	₯10,000,000	1991
Sotiris Mavrodimos	(Greece)	CB / DM / RB / LB	18 July 1962 (aged 25)	1986	(Greece) Kozani	₯5,500,000	1991
Christos Vasilopoulos	(Greece)	RB / LB	12 November 1962 (aged 25)	1986	(Greece) Panachaiki	₯8,000,000	1991
Georgios Koutoulas	(Greece)	CB / LB	9 February 1967 (aged 21)	1987	(Greece) AEK Athens U20	—	1990
Dimitris Volonakis	(Greece) (Australia)	LB / CB	27 February 1967 (aged 21)	1987	(Greece) AEK Athens U20	—	1990
Midfielders
Rajko Janjanin	(Socialist Federal Republic of Yugoslavia)	CM / AM / DM	18 January 1957 (aged 31)	1986	(Greece) OFI	Free	1988
Dimitris Pittas	(Greece)	AM / SS / CM	8 April 1958 (aged 30)	1986	(Greece) PAOK	Free	1988
Pavlos Papaioannou (Vice-captain)	(Greece) (Brazil)	DM / RB / LB / RM	19 May 1959 (aged 29)	1983	(Greece) Rodos	₯10,000,000	1988
Nikos Pias	(Greece)	CM / DM	7 April 1960 (aged 28)	1984	(Greece) Rodos	₯1,350,000	1989
Vasilios Vasilakos	(Greece)	AM	7 September 1960 (aged 27)	1987	(Greece) PAOK	₯10,000,000	1990
Giorgos Savvidis	(Cyprus)	RM / AM / RW / SS / ST	8 February 1961 (aged 27)	1987	(Cyprus) Omonia	₯20,940,600	1992
Lampros Georgiadis	(Greece)	LM / AM / LB	11 July 1963 (aged 24)	1986	(Greece) Anagennisi Arta	₯11,000,000	1991
Jim Patikas	(Australia) (Greece)	RM / LM / RW / LW / SS	18 October 1963 (aged 24)	1985	(Australia) Sydney Croatia	₯5,000,000	1988
Forwards
Giannis Dintsikos	(Greece)	ST / SS / RW / LW / AM	25 June 1960 (aged 28)	1981	(Greece) Kastoria	₯20,000,000	1991
Henrik Nielsen	(Denmark)	ST / SS	29 March 1965 (aged 23)	1987	(Denmark) B93	₯7,000,000	1990
Left during Winter Transfer Window
Panagiotis Stylianopoulos	(Greece)	RB / LB / RM / DM	4 September 1957 (aged 30)	1978	(Greece) AEK Athens U20	—	1988
Georgios Christodoulou	(Greece)	ST / SS / LW	20 May 1967 (aged 21)	1985	(Greece) Akratitos	Free	1993

== Transfers ==
=== In ===
==== Summer ====
Pos.	Player	From	Fee	Date	Contract Until	Source
GK	(Greece) Fanis Kofinas	(Greece) Ionikos	Loan return	1 July 1987	30 June 1992	
DF	(Greece) Georgios Koutoulas	(Greece) AEK Athens U20	Promotion	1 July 1987	30 June 1990	
DF	(Greece) Dimitris Volonakis	(Greece) AEK Athens U20	Promotion	1 July 1987	30 June 1990	
MF	(Cyprus) Giorgos Savvidis	(Cyprus) Omonia	₯20,940,600^{[a]}	14 July 1987	30 June 1992	
MF	(Greece) Vasilios Vasilakos	(Greece) PAOK	₯10,000,000	15 July 1987	30 June 1990	
FW	(Denmark) Henrik Nielsen	(Denmark) B93	₯7,000,000	10 July 1987	30 June 1990	
FW	(Greece) Michalis Pytharoulis	(Greece) Fostiras	Loan return	1 July 1987	30 June 1989	

==== Winter ====
Pos.	Player	From	Fee	Date	Contract Until	Source
MF	(Greece) Dimitris Stafylidis	(Greece) Pannafpliakos	Loan return	1 December 1987	30 June 1988	

=== Out ===
==== Summer ====
Pos.	Player	To	Fee	Date	Source
DF	(Greece) Stefanos Porfyris	(Greece) Ionikos	Contract termination	1 August 1987	
DF	(Greece) Ilias Armodoros	(Greece) Levadiakos	Contract termination	8 July 1987	
MF	(Greece) Pavlos Dimitriou	(Greece) Panserraikos	₯3,000,000	15 July 1987	
FW	(Greece) Thomas Mavros	(Greece) Panionios	End of contract	15 July 1987	
FW	(Sweden) Håkan Sandberg	(Greece) Olympiacos	Contract termination	2 July 1987	
FW	(Greece) Andreas Voitsidis	(Greece) PAS Giannina	Free transfer	15 July 1987	

==== Winter ====
Pos.	Player	To	Fee	Date	Source
DF	(Greece) Panagiotis Stylianopoulos	(Greece) Ionikos	Contract termination	17 December 1987	
MF	(Greece) Dimitris Stafylidis	Free agent	Contract termination	16 December 1987	

=== Loan out ===
==== Summer ====
Pos.	Player	To	Fee	Date	Until	Option to buy	Source
FW	(Greece) Michalis Pytharoulis	(Greece) Fostiras	Free	6 July 1987	30 June 1988	✗	

==== Winter ====
Pos.	Player	To	Fee	Date	Until	Option to buy	Source
FW	(Greece) Georgios Christodoulou	(Greece) Acharnaikos	Free	15 December 1987	30 June 1988	✗	

=== Contract renewals ===
Pos.	Player	Date	Former Exp. Date	New Exp. Date	Source
GK	(Greece) Fanis Kofinas	14 July 1987	30 June 1987	30 June 1992	
FW	(Greece) Georgios Christodoulou	29 June 1987	30 June 1988	30 June 1993^{[b]}	

Notes

a. and a friendly game between the two teams.
b. The 5-year duration of the new contract is effective from June 30, when the previous contract ends.

=== Overall transfer activity ===
==== Expenditure ====
Summer: ▼ ₯37,940,600

Winter: ▼ ₯0

Total: ▼ ₯37,940,600

==== Income ====
Summer: ▲ ₯3,000,000

Winter: ▲ ₯0

Total: ▲ ₯3,000,000

==== Net Totals ====
Summer: ▼ ₯34,940,600

Winter: ₯0

Total: ▼ ₯34,940,600

== Pre-season and friendlies ==
23 July 1987 Friendly	Stentun XI	3–3	AEK Athens	Stentun
20:00 EEST (UTC+3)	Jurna 73', 78', 80'	Report	Pias 27'; Volonakis 47'; Mavrodimos 53'

25 July 1987 Friendly	DSC	0–14	AEK Athens	Zaterntant
20:00 EEST (UTC+3)		Report	Nielsen 2', 46', 64'; Manolas 28'; Patikas 31', 38'; Vasilakos 33', 85'; Georgiadis 35'; Savvidis 53', 79'; Janjanin 63', 74' (pen.), 90'

27 July 1987 Friendly	FEVV	0–10	AEK Athens	Gieten
20:00 EEST (UTC+3)		Report	Nielsen 3', 30', 38', 43'; Savvidis 51', 63'; Vasilakos 73'; Papaioannou 75'; Pittas 77'; Dintsikos

28 July 1987 Friendly	Twente	4–2	AEK Athens	Gieten
20:00 EEST (UTC+3)	Winbelin 5', 27'; Lipponen 80'; Keur 82'	Report	Nielsen 62' (pen.); Dintsikos 84'

30 July 1987 Friendly	Assen	0–6	AEK Athens	Gieten
20:00 EEST (UTC+3)		Report	Nielsen 51', 57', 65'; Savvidis 53'; Pias 75', 80'

5 August 1987 Friendly	Panargiakos	0–7	AEK Athens	Argos
18:30 EEST (UTC+3)		Report	Janjanin (penalty missed) 8', 33'; Georgiadis 18'; Pias 47', 67', 84'; Papaioannou 62'; Christodoulou 71'	Stadium: Argos Municipal Stadium; Attendance: 7,000; Referee: Tatsoulis

10 August 1987 Friendly	AEL	2–3	AEK Athens	Larissa
21:15 EEST (UTC+3)	Mitsibonas 23' (pen.); Kanieba 50'	Report	Pias 20'; Georgiadis 44'; Manolas 80'	Stadium: Alcazar Stadium; Attendance: 18,000; Referee: Ilias Karamanis (Boeotia)

17 August 1987 Friendly	AEK Athens	1–1	Dukla Prague	Nea Filadelfeia
21:30 EEST (UTC+3)	Stylianopoulos 70'; Volonakis (yellow card) 77'	Report	Luhový 90+2'	Stadium: AEK Stadium; Attendance: 19,429; Referee: Makis Germanakos (Athens)

19 August 1987 Friendly	AEK Athens	2–1	Iraklis	Marousi
21:00 EEST (UTC+3)	Nielsen 1', 13'	Report	Anastasiadis 78'	Stadium: Olympic Stadium; Attendance: 10,248; Referee: Christos Kolokythas (Athens)

22 August 1987 Friendly	Egaleo	0–1	AEK Athens	Aigaleo
18:30 EEST (UTC+3)		Report	Georgiadis 24'	Stadium: Stavros Mavrothalassitis Stadium; Attendance: 3,000; Referee: Dimitris Giakoumatos (Athens)

24 August 1987 Friendly	Ethnikos Piraeus	1–0	AEK Athens	Piraeus
21:00 EEST (UTC+3)	Batista 65'	Report		Stadium: Karaiskakis Stadium; Attendance: 12,153; Referee: Vangelis Giannakoudakis (Piraeus)

26 August 1987 Friendly	Rodos	2–5	AEK Athens	Rhodes
17:30 EEST (UTC+3)	Vasilarakis (penalty missed) 34'; Rigas 51' (pen.); Dourdounias 90' (pen.)	Report	Vasilakos 3', 8'; Mavrodimos 49'; Nielsen 61', 74' (pen.)	Stadium: Diagoras Stadium; Attendance: 4,000; Referee: Orestis Pavlidis (Dodecanese)

29 August 1987 Friendly	Omonia	2–1	AEK Athens	Nicosia
20:30 EEST (UTC+3)	Dzhevizov 29'; Kantilos 62'	Report	Nielsen 67'	Stadium: Makario Stadium; Attendance: 15,000; Referee: A. Georgiou (Cyprus)
Note: Friendly match as part of the transfer of Giorgos Savvidis.

16 September 1987 Friendly	Acharnaikos	1–4	AEK Athens	Acharnes
16:00 EEST (UTC+3)	Pissas 82'	Report	Christodoulou 26', 39'; Georgiadis 41'; Savvidis 76'	Stadium: Acharnes Stadium; Referee: Kostas Akridas (Athens)

23 September 1987 Friendly	A.O. Kifisia	0–6	AEK Athens	Kifissia
15:00 EEST (UTC+3)		Report	Vasilakos 5', 42'; Mavrodimos 12', (penalty missed) 67'; Savvidis 15'; Pittas 30'; Tzogias 81'	Stadium: Zirineio Stadium

30 September 1987 Friendly	Fostiras	1–1	AEK Athens	Tavros
15:30 EEST (UTC+3)	Papageorgiou 69'	Report	Pittas 32'	Stadium: Tavros Stadium; Referee: G. Pappas (Athens)

7 October 1987 Friendly	Egaleo	1–6	AEK Athens	Aigaleo
15:30 EEST (UTC+3)	Theodoridis 58' (pen.)	Report	Savvidis 4', 53'; Pias 35'; Nielsen 40' (pen.); Patikas 44'; Christodoulou 72'	Stadium: Aigaleo Municipal Stadium; Referee: Ilias Doutsias (Piraeus)

9 December 1987 Friendly	Korinthos	0–0	AEK Athens	Corinth
14:30 EET (UTC+2)		Report		Stadium: Korinthos Stadium; Attendance: 2,000; Referee: Chatzis

== Competitions ==
=== Overall record ===
Competition	First match	Last match	Starting round	Final position	Record							
Competition	First match	Last match	Starting round	Final position	Pld	W	D	L	GF	GA	GD	Win %
Alpha Ethniki	6 September 1987	15 May 1988	Matchday 1	2nd	30	15	10	5	51	31	+20	50.00
Greek Cup	25 October 1987	10 February 1988	First round	Round of 16	5	2	1	2	9	8	+1	40.00
Total					35	17	11	7	60	39	+21	48.57

Last updated: 15 May 1988
Source: Competitions

=== Alpha Ethniki ===
==== League table ====
Pos	Team	Pld	W	D	L	GF	GA	GD	Pts	Qualification or relegation
1	AEL (C)	30	18	7	5	51	22	+29	43	Qualification for European Cup first round
2	AEK Athens	30	15	10	5	51	31	+20	40	Qualification for UEFA Cup first round
3	PAOK	30	17	5	8	60	27	+33	39	Qualification for UEFA Cup first round
4	OFI	30	17	3	10	54	41	+13	37	
5	Panathinaikos	30	15	6	9	47	34	+13	36	Qualification for Cup Winners' Cup first round

Source: RSSSF
Rules for classification: 1st points; 2nd head-to-head points; 3rd head-to-head goal difference; 4th decision match.
(C) Champions

==== Results summary ====
Overall								Home						Away					
Pld	W	D	L	GF	GA	GD	Pts	W	D	L	GF	GA	GD	W	D	L	GF	GA	GD
30	15	10	5	51	31	+20	40	13	2	0	36	10	+26	2	8	5	15	21	−6

Source: Competitive matches

==== Results by Matchday ====
Round	1	2	3	4	5	6	7	8	9	10	11	12	13	14	15	16	17	18	19	20	21	22	23	24	25	26	27	28	29	30
Ground	A	A	H	A	H	A	H	H	A	H	A	H	A	H	A	H	H	A	H	A	H	A	A	H	A	H	A	H	A	H
Result	D	D	W	L	W	L	W	W	D	W	D	W	D	W	D	W	W	L	W	D	W	L	W	D	L	W	D	D	W	W
Position	8	7	6	8	7	9	6	6	6	6	6	3	4	4	4	2	2	3	3	3	2	3	2	3	3	3	3	4	2	2

Source: Competitive matches
A = Away; H = Home; W = Win; D = Draw; L = Loss; P = Postponed

==== Matches ====
6 September 1987 1	PAOK	2–2	AEK Athens	Thessaloniki
17:00 EEST (UTC+3)	Bannon 10'; Karasavvidis 74'		Volonakis (yellow card); Vasilakos 5'; Nielsen 83'	Stadium: Toumba Stadium; Attendance: 33,243; Referee: Giorgos Koukoulakis (Heraklion)

13 September 1987 2	Olympiacos	2–2	AEK Athens	Marousi
17:00 EEST (UTC+3)	Papachristou (yellow card); Alexiou (yellow card); Mitropoulos (yellow card) (yellow-red card) 79'; Zelelidis 2'; Vaitsis 76'		Papadopoulos (yellow card); Mavrodimos (yellow card); Volonakis (yellow card); Manolas 4', 12', (yellow card)	Stadium: Olympic Stadium; Attendance: 72,047; Referee: Nikos Andreou (Athens)

27 September 1987 3	AEK Athens	3–2	Panachaiki	Nea Filadelfeia
15:30 EEST (UTC+3)	Karagiozopoulos 25', (yellow card); Patikas 46', 57'		Zerdevas (yellow card); Papagiannopoulos (yellow card); Vujadinović 3', (yellow card); Giotis 23'	Stadium: AEK Stadium; Attendance: 19,831; Referee: Stavros Zakestidis (Thessaloniki)
Note: First official match at AEK Stadium after 2 years.

4 October 1987 4	Aris	4–1	AEK Athens	Thessaloniki
15:30 EEST (UTC+3)	Moustakidis (yellow card); Gioukoudis 27', 69'; Samolis 32'; Ballis (yellow card) 85' (yellow-red card) 86'; Dimitriadis 90', (yellow card)		Savvidis (yellow card); Georgiadis (yellow card); Mavrodimos (yellow card) (yellow-red card) 86'; Nielsen 51'	Stadium: Aris Stadium; Attendance: 15,335; Referee: Vassilios Nikakis (Aetoloacarnania)

18 October 1987 5	AEK Athens	4–0	Diagoras	Nea Filadelfeia
15:00 EEST (UTC+3)	Nielsen 10', 31' (pen.); Manolas 28'; Savvidis 50'		Kastanos (yellow card); Lukač (yellow card)	Stadium: AEK Stadium; Attendance: 13,509; Referee: Miniatis (Corfu)

1 November 1987 6	OFI	3–0	AEK Athens	Heraklion
15:00 EET (UTC+2)	Andreanidis (yellow card); Papavasileiou 25'; Charalampidis 29'; Samaras 52', (yellow card) 68'		Georgiadis (yellow card)	Stadium: Theodoros Vardinogiannis Stadium; Attendance: 10,978; Referee: Vangelis Giannakoudakis (Piraeus)

8 November 1987 7	AEK Athens	2–1	AEL	Nea Filadelfeia
15:00 EET (UTC+2)	Vasilakos (yellow card) 4'; Manolas (yellow card) 9'; Chatzopoulos (yellow card) 11'; Patikas 48'; Nielsen 82'		Tsiolis (yellow card) 72'; Mitsibonas (yellow card) 77'; Tsingov 88'	Stadium: AEK Stadium; Attendance: 24,149; Referee: Stelios Charlavanis (Euboea)

22 November 1987 8	AEK Athens	2–1	Panserraikos	Nea Filadelfeia
14:45 EET (UTC+2)	Chatzopoulos (yellow card); Georgiadis (yellow card); Nielsen 25'; Vasilakos (yellow card) 80'; Koutoulas 88'		Dimitriou 26'; Galatidis (red card) 80'	Stadium: AEK Stadium; Attendance: 9,280; Referee: Giorgos Koukoulakis (Heraklion)

29 November 1987 9	Panionios	1–1	AEK Athens	Nea Smyrni
14:45 EET (UTC+2)	Lima (yellow card) (yellow-red card) 62'; Papachristopoulos (yellow card); Aposporis (yellow card); Juričić 70'		Karagiozopoulos (penalty missed) 36'; Savvidis 83'	Stadium: Nea Smyrni Stadium; Attendance: 10,703; Referee: Nikos Vournelis (Thessaloniki)

6 December 1987 10	AEK Athens	7–1	Veria	Nea Filadelfeia
14:45 EET (UTC+2)	Nielsen 10', 36' (pen.), 40', 47'; Vasilakos 24', 84'; Peppes 25', (yellow card)		Kaltsas 12'	Stadium: AEK Stadium; Attendance: 7,932; Referee: Dimitris Naoum (Thessaloniki)

20 December 1987 11	Levadiakos	1–1	AEK Athens	Levadia
14:45 EET (UTC+2)	Bletsas 30'		Vasilakos (yellow card); Patikas 1'	Stadium: Levadia Municipal Stadium; Attendance: 7,631; Referee: Dimitris Koutroulis (Pyrgos)

27 December 1987 12	AEK Athens	2–0	Apollon Kalamarias	Nea Filadelfeia
14:45 EET (UTC+2)	Nielsen 7' (pen.); Koutoulas 24'; Karagiozopoulos (yellow card) 72'		Vazakas (yellow card) 30' (yellow-red card) 83'; Simeunović (yellow card) 83'	Stadium: AEK Stadium; Attendance: 17,173; Referee: Giannis Georgiadis (Drama)

3 January 1988 13	Panathinaikos	1–1	AEK Athens	Marousi
14:45 EET (UTC+2)	Dimopoulos 26'; Vamvakoulas (yellow card) 40'		Koutoulas 18'; Peppes (yellow card) 45'; Karagiozopoulos (yellow card) 51'; Vasilakos (yellow card) 61'	Stadium: Olympic Stadium; Attendance: 59,481; Referee: Giorgos Koukoulakis (Heraklion)

10 January 1988 14	AEK Athens	2–0	Ethnikos Piraeus	Nea Filadelfeia
14:45 EET (UTC+2)	Chatzopoulos (yellow card) 17'; Manolas (yellow card) 17'; Koutoulas (yellow card) 23'; Vasilakos 47'; Nielsen 81' (pen.); Peppes (yellow card) 84'		Doxakis (yellow card) 30'; Dimitropoulos (yellow card) 38'; Lyris (yellow card) 88'; Katsikogiannis (yellow card) 88'	Stadium: AEK Stadium; Attendance: 19,895; Referee: Giannis Kosmidis (Alexandroupoli)
Note: At halftime, a strange incident occurred when people began to set up cameras and crews, attendees and footballers with yellow and blue and white shirts entered the pitch. AEK Stadium was chosen for the shooting of the movie "The Striker with Number 9" by Pantelis Voulgaris, with the crowd having no idea of what was happening. However, despite the difficulties of the shooting, Stratos Tzortzoglou stated the experience was shocking and magical having 30,000 people chanting and booing on set.

17 January 1988 15	Iraklis	0–0	AEK Athens	Thessaloniki
14:45 EET (UTC+2)	Manolas (yellow card) 16'; Pittas (yellow card) 53'		Vakalopoulos (yellow card) 11'; D. Papadopoulos (yellow card) 49'; Kofidis (yellow card) 17'	Stadium: Kaftanzoglio Stadium; Attendance: 15,998; Referee: Giorgos Koukoulas (Lesbos)

24 January 1988 16	AEK Athens	1–0	PAOK	Nea Filadelfeia
14:45 EET (UTC+2)	Pittas (yellow card) 23', (goal) 30'		Bannon (yellow card) 44'	Stadium: AEK Stadium; Attendance: 26,217; Referee: Giorgos Koukoulakis (Heraklion)
Note: At the 30th minute, AEK won an indirect foul from quite a long distance and Pittas had not seen the gesture of the referee for an indirect foul, which he executed directly with the ball hitting the goalkeeper's hand and ending up in the net. If the goalkeeper had let the ball go straight to the net, the goal would not count. PAOK objected to the replay of the match but, this objection fell on deaf ears.

31 January 1988 17	AEK Athens	2–0	Olympiacos	Nea Filadelfeia
14:45 EET (UTC+2)	Patikas 1'; Mavrodimos (yellow card) 2'; Nielsen 49' (pen.); Manolas (yellow card) 73' (yellow-red card) 88'		Pachatouridis (yellow card) 40'; Funes (yellow card) 87'	Stadium: AEK Stadium; Attendance: 31,306; Referee: Dimitris Naoum (Thessaloniki)
Note: All-time record income for the AEK Stadium, which was ₯25,648,400.

7 February 1988 18	Panachaiki	2–1	AEK Athens	Patras
15:00 EET (UTC+2)	Vujadinović (yellow card) (yellow-red card) 80'; Spanosotiropoulos (yellow card) 22'; Vaitsis (yellow card) 63'; Panagiotidis 43'; Zikos 59'		Vasilopoulos (yellow card) 3'; Nielsen 65'	Stadium: Panachaiki Stadium; Attendance: 15,003; Referee: Kostas Akridas (Athens)

14 February 1988 19	AEK Athens	2–1	Aris	Nea Filadelfeia
15:00 EET (UTC+2)	Nielsen 9', 43'; Kofinas (yellow card) 84'; Patikas (yellow card) 89'		Bougiouklis (yellow card) 36'; Dimitriadis 74', (yellow card) 83'; Tziolas (yellow card) 87'; Mouratidis (yellow card) 87'	Stadium: AEK Stadium; Attendance: 4,714; Referee: Grigoris Brentas (Thessaloniki)

22 February 1988 20	Diagoras	0–0	AEK Athens	Rhodes
15:00 EET (UTC+2)	Kostikos (yellow card) 4'; Chatzoglou (yellow card) 4'; D. Athanasiou (yellow card) 71'; V. Athanasiou (yellow card) 78'		Nielsen (penalty missed) 41'; Koutoulas (yellow card) 43'; Chatzis (red card) 70'	Stadium: Diagoras Stadium; Attendance: 3,553; Referee: Kostas Akridas (Athens)

28 February 1988 21	AEK Athens	2–1	OFI	Livadeia
15:00 EET (UTC+2)	Pias (yellow card); Chatzopoulos (yellow card); Janjanin (yellow card) , (penalty missed) 81'; Savvidis 49'; Manolas 81'		Michalitsos (yellow card); Samaras 5', (yellow card)	Stadium: Levadia Municipal Stadium; Attendance: 5,177; Referee: Vassilios Nikakis (Aetoloacarnania)
Note: AEK were punished with 3 games away from home, due to the incidents in the away league game against Panachaiki.

6 March 1988 22	AEL	2–0	AEK Athens	Larissa
15:30 EET (UTC+2)	Ziogas 1'; Karapialis 23'; Kolomitrousis (yellow card) 65'		Papaioannou (yellow card) 67'; Mavrodimos (yellow card) 84'	Stadium: Alcazar Stadium; Attendance: 17,810; Referee: Stelios Charlavanis (Euboea)

13 March 1988 23	Panserraikos	0–1	AEK Athens	Serres
15:30 EET (UTC+2)	Savvidis (yellow card) 46', (penalty missed) 57'; Pergaminos (yellow card) 68'; Aivazidis (yellow card) 84'		Volonakis (yellow card) 23'; Pias (yellow card) 35' (yellow-red card) 68'; Pittas 88'	Stadium: Serres Municipal Stadium; Attendance: 9,071; Referee: Dimitris Daoulas (Aetoloacarnania)

20 March 1988 24	AEK Athens	1–1	Panionios	Volos
15:30 EET (UTC+2)	Koutoulas 82'		Kanaras 63'; Marangos (yellow card) 75'; Manikas (yellow card) 82'	Stadium: Volos Municipal Stadium; Attendance: 8,000; Referee: Stavros Zakestidis (Thessaloniki)

27 March 1988 25	Veria	1–0	AEK Athens	Veria
16:00 EEST (UTC+3)	Peppes 1' (o.g.); Mantzoukis (yellow card) 48'; Mantziounis (yellow card) 49'; Karaiskos (yellow card) 88'		Mavrodimos (yellow card) 6'; Peppes (yellow card) 37'; Manolas (yellow card) 38'; Papaioannou (yellow card) 58'	Stadium: Veria Stadium; Attendance: 4,521; Referee: Kostas Adamopoulos (Athens)

3 April 1988 26	AEK Athens	3–0	Levadiakos	Nea Filadelfeia
16:00 EEST (UTC+3)	Georgiadis 13'; Nielsen 63', 80' (pen.)			Stadium: AEK Stadium; Attendance: 16,688; Referee: Grigoris Brentas (Thessaloniki)

17 April 1988 27	Apollon Kalamarias	2–2	AEK Athens	Thessaloniki
17:00 EEST (UTC+3)	Sachinis (yellow card) 4'; Semertzidis 54'; Tsekos 55'; Chatziioannidis (yellow card) 80'		Chatzis (yellow card) 4'; Vasilopoulos (yellow card) 10'; Nielsen 44', 50'	Stadium: Kalamaria Stadium; Attendance: 3,509; Referee: Makis Germanakos (Athens)

24 April 1988 28	AEK Athens	2–2	Panathinaikos	Nea Filadelfeia
17:00 EEST (UTC+3)	Peppes 23'; Vasilopoulos (yellow card) 35'; Koutoulas (yellow card) 45'; Savvidis 60'; Pittas (yellow card) 87'		Batsinilas 41'; L. Christodoulou (yellow card) 45'; Kalitzakis (yellow card) 67'; Chatziathanasiou 84'	Stadium: AEK Stadium; Attendance: 27,708; Referee: Tasos Kantartzis (Thessaloniki)

1 May 1988 29	Ethnikos Piraeus	0–3	AEK Athens	Piraeus
17:00 EEST (UTC+3)	Kampolis (yellow card)		Janjanin 52'; Nielsen 82' (pen.); Savvidis 89'	Stadium: Karaiskakis Stadium; Attendance: 16,361; Referee: Dimitris Daoulas (Aetoloacarnania)

15 May 1988 30	AEK Athens	1–0	Iraklis	Nea Filadelfeia
17:30 EEST (UTC+3)	Chatzopoulos 8'; Vasilopoulos (yellow card) 36'		Georgiev (yellow card) 19'	Stadium: AEK Stadium; Attendance: 20,504; Referee: Alexandros Naziris (Thessaloniki)

=== Greek Cup ===
==== Matches ====
25 October 1987 First round	AEK Athens	3–1	Iraklis	Nea Filadelfeia
14:30 EEST (UTC+3)	Vasilakos (yellow card); Manolas (yellow card); Patikas 26'; Nielsen 61', 72'	Report	Iliadis (yellow card); Zifkas (yellow card); Karaiskos (yellow card); Kofidis 86'	Stadium: AEK Stadium; Attendance: 25,424; Referee: Christos Kolokythas (Athens)

===== Round of 32 =====
30 December 1987 First leg	Kallithea	3–2	AEK Athens	Kallithea
14:45 EET (UTC+2)	Chatziraptis 11'; Tsevretzis 21'; Tzimas 63'	Report	Pittas 4', 56'	Stadium: Grigoris Lambrakis Stadium; Referee: Giorgos Koukoulakis (Heraklion)

13 January 1988 Second leg	AEK Athens	2–0 (4–3 agg.)	Kallithea	Nea Filadelfeia
15:00 EET (UTC+2)	Pittas 1'; Georgiadis 65'	Report	Syrtis (yellow card); Tsouvaltsidis (yellow card)	Stadium: AEK Stadium; Attendance: 4,440; Referee: Giorgos Plevritis (Thessaloniki)

===== Round of 16 =====
27 January 1988 First leg	Olympiacos	1–1	AEK Athens	Piraeus
14:45 EET (UTC+2)	Apostolakis (yellow card); Moustakidis 76'	Report	Georgiadis (yellow card); Pittas (yellow card); Papadopoulos (yellow card); Vasilakos 24'	Stadium: Karaiskakis Stadium; Attendance: 33,373; Referee: Makis Germanakos (Athens)
Note: After the game, serious incidents between the fans took place, which resulted in at least 4 injuries.

10 February 1988 Second leg	AEK Athens	1–3 (2–4 agg.)	Olympiacos	Nea Filadelfeia
14:45 EET (UTC+2)	Manolas (yellow card) 30' (yellow-red card) 84'; Mavrodimos 37'; Peppes (yellow card) 56'	Report	Hantzidis 11'; Baniotis (yellow card) 46'; Nentidis (yellow card) 56'; Mitropoulos 60', (yellow card) 62' (yellow-red card) 84'; Funes 75'	Stadium: AEK Stadium; Attendance: 23,929; Referee: Vasilis Nikakis (Aetoloacarnania)
Note: The match was followed by allegations of bribe and various machinations at AEK's expense, with former Olympiacos footballer, Gounaris and former AEK footballer, Ballis involved as intermediaries. Although nothing was proven, Ballis was punished for active bribery. Neither the receivers of the bribe, nor the one who orchestreatd the whole scheme were ever made public.

== Statistics ==
=== Squad statistics ===
As of 15 May 1988

No.	Pos	Player	Alpha Ethniki		Greek Cup		Total	
No.	Pos	Player	Apps	Goals	Apps	Goals	Apps	Goals
Goalkeepers
—	GK	(Greece) Spyros Ikonomopoulos	4	0	0	0	4	0
—	GK	(Greece) Theologis Papadopoulos	17	0	4	0	21	0
—	GK	(Greece) Fanis Kofinas	11	0	1	0	12	0
Defenders
—	DF	(Greece) Makis Chatzis	16	0	4	0	20	0
—	DF	(Greece) Takis Karagiozopoulos	14	1	2	0	16	1
—	DF	(Greece) Polyvios Chatzopoulos	21	1	3	0	24	1
—	DF	(Greece) Stelios Manolas	21	4	4	0	25	4
—	DF	(Greece) Giorgos Peppes	30	2	3	0	33	2
—	DF	(Greece) Sotiris Mavrodimos	23	0	4	1	27	1
—	DF	(Greece) Christos Vasilopoulos	13	0	4	0	17	0
—	DF	(Greece) Georgios Koutoulas	24	4	3	0	27	4
—	DF	(Greece) Dimitris Volonakis	7	0	1	0	8	0
Midfielders
—	MF	(Socialist Federal Republic of Yugoslavia) Rajko Janjanin	28	1	3	0	31	1
—	MF	(Greece) Dimitris Pittas	14	2	3	3	17	5
—	MF	(Greece) Pavlos Papaioannou	17	0	1	0	18	0
—	MF	(Greece) Nikos Pias	16	0	4	0	20	0
—	MF	(Greece) Vasilios Vasilakos	23	4	4	1	27	5
—	MF	(Cyprus) Giorgos Savvidis	23	5	3	0	26	5
—	MF	(Greece) Lampros Georgiadis	19	1	4	1	23	2
—	MF	(Australia) Jim Patikas	15	5	2	1	17	6
Forwards
—	FW	(Greece) Giannis Dintsikos	2	0	2	0	4	0
—	FW	(Denmark) Henrik Nielsen	27	21	4	2	31	23
Left during Winter Transfer Window
—	DF	(Greece) Panagiotis Stylianopoulos	3	0	0	0	3	0
—	FW	(Greece) Georgios Christodoulou	2	0	0	0	2	0

=== Goalscorers ===
As of 15 May 1988
The list is sorted by competition order when total goals are equal, then by position and then alphabetically by surname.

Rank	Pos.	Player	Alpha Ethniki	Greek Cup	Total
1	FW	(Denmark) Henrik Nielsen	21	2	23
2	MF	(Australia) Jim Patikas	5	1	6
3	MF	(Cyprus) Giorgos Savvidis	5	0	5
3	MF	(Greece) Vasilios Vasilakos	4	1	5
3	MF	(Greece) Dimitris Pittas	2	3	5
6	DF	(Greece) Georgios Koutoulas	4	0	4
6	DF	(Greece) Stelios Manolas	4	0	4
8	DF	(Greece) Giorgos Peppes	2	0	2
8	MF	(Greece) Lampros Georgiadis	1	1	2
10	DF	(Greece) Takis Karagiozopoulos	1	0	1
10	DF	(Greece) Polyvios Chatzopoulos	1	0	1
10	MF	(Socialist Federal Republic of Yugoslavia) Rajko Janjanin	1	0	1
10	DF	(Greece) Sotiris Mavrodimos	0	1	1
Own goals			0	0	0
Totals			51	9	60

=== Hat-tricks ===
Numbers in superscript represent the goals that the player scored.

Player	Against	Result	Date	Competition	Source
(Denmark) Henrik Nielsen^{4}	(Greece) Veria	7–1 (H)	6 December 1987	Alpha Ethniki	

=== Clean sheets ===
As of 15 May 1988
The list is sorted by competition order when total clean sheets are equal and then alphabetically by surname. Clean sheets in games where both goalkeepers participated are awarded to the goalkeeper who started the game. Goalkeepers with no appearances are not included.

Rank	Player	Alpha Ethniki	Greek Cup	Total
1	(Greece) Theologis Papadopoulos	6	1	7
2	(Greece) Spyros Ikonomopoulos	3	0	3
3	(Greece) Fanis Kofinas	2	0	2
Totals		11	1	12

=== Disciplinary record ===
As of 15 May 1988

N	P	Nat.	Name	Alpha Ethniki			Greek Cup			Total			Notes
N	P	Nat.	Name	Yellow card	Second yellow card	Red card	Yellow card	Second yellow card	Red card	Yellow card	Second yellow card	Red card	Notes
Goalkeepers
—	GK	(Greece)	Spyros Ikonomopoulos										
—	GK	(Greece)	Theologis Papadopoulos	1			1			2			
—	GK	(Greece)	Fanis Kofinas	1						1			
Defenders
—	DF	(Greece)	Makis Chatzis	1		1				1		1	
—	DF	(Greece)	Takis Karagiozopoulos	3						3			
—	DF	(Greece)	Polyvios Chatzopoulos	4						4			
—	DF	(Greece)	Stelios Manolas	7	1		3	1		10	2		
—	DF	(Greece)	Giorgos Peppes	4			1			5			
—	DF	(Greece)	Sotiris Mavrodimos	6	1					6	1		
—	DF	(Greece)	Christos Vasilopoulos	4						4			
—	DF	(Greece)	Georgios Koutoulas	3						3			
—	DF	(Greece)	Dimitris Volonakis	3						3			
Midfielders
—	MF	(Socialist Federal Republic of Yugoslavia)	Rajko Janjanin	1						1			
—	MF	(Greece)	Dimitris Pittas	3						3			
—	MF	(Greece)	Pavlos Papaioannou	2						2			
—	MF	(Greece)	Nikos Pias	3	1					3	1		
—	MF	(Greece)	Vasilios Vasilakos	4			1			5			
—	MF	(Cyprus)	Giorgos Savvidis	1						1			
—	MF	(Greece)	Lampros Georgiadis	3			1			4			
—	MF	(Australia)	Jim Patikas	1						1			
Forwards
—	FW	(Greece)	Giannis Dintsikos										
—	FW	(Denmark)	Henrik Nielsen										
Left during Winter Transfer Window
—	DF	(Greece)	Panagiotis Stylianopoulos										
—	FW	(Greece)	Georgios Christodoulou										

=== Starting 11 ===
This section presents the most frequently used formation along with the players with the most starts across all competitions.

N.	Formation	Matchday(s)
35	4–2–3–1	1–30

Nat.	Player	Pos.
(Greece)	Theologis Papadopoulos	GK
(Greece)	Stelios Manolas (C)	RCB
(Greece)	Giorgos Peppes	LCB
(Greece)	Polyvios Chatzopoulos	RB
(Greece)	Georgios Koutoulas	LB
(Greece)	Sotiris Mavrodimos	DM
(Socialist Federal Republic of Yugoslavia)	Rajko Janjanin	CM
(Cyprus)	Giorgos Savvidis	RM
(Australia)	Jim Patikas	LM
(Greece)	Vasilios Vasilakos	AM
(Denmark)	Henrik Nielsen	CF

Last updated: 1988-05-15

== Awards ==
Player	Pos.	Award	Source
(Denmark) Henrik Nielsen	FW	Alpha Ethniki Top Scorer	
