= 1986–87 AEK Athens F.C. season =

AEK Athens
1986–87 season
- Chairman: Andreas Zafiropoulos
- Manager: Ab Fafié (until 29 December); Nikos Alefantos (until 7 May); Nikos Christidis
- Stadium: Athens Olympic Stadium
- Alpha Ethniki: 7th
- Greek Cup: Additional round
- UEFA Cup: First round
- Top goalscorer: League: Jim Patikas (5); All: Jim Patikas (5)
- Highest home attendance: 55,186 vs Internazionale (21 October 1986)
- Lowest home attendance: 6,896 vs Apollon Kalamarias (11 April 1987)
- Average home league attendance: 16,270
- Biggest win: AEK Athens 5–0 Veria
- Biggest defeat: AEK Athens 0–3 Panathinaikos
Home colours	Away colours

The 1986–87 season was the 63rd season in the existence of AEK Athens F.C. and the 28th consecutive season in the top flight of Greek football. They competed in the Alpha Ethniki, the Greek Cup and the UEFA Cup. The season began on 7 September 1986 and finished on 7 June 1987.

== Kits ==
Supplier: Zita Hellas
Sponsor(s): Ethniki Asfalistiki

Home	Away

== Overview ==
In the summer of 1986, AEK Athens continued to be administratively at the hands of Andreas Zafiropoulos. The reactions of the fans towards the administration became even more intense, while the financial problems began to appear in the club. Nevertheless, AEK proceeded with the transfers of Dimitris Pittas from PAOK, Giorgos Peppes from Ethnikos Piraeus and Lampros Georgiadis from Anagennisi Arta. As for the wheel of the team, Zafiropoulos decided to entrust it to a practitioner of the Dutch "school" and brought Ab Fafié to Athens and signed him on July 7. The Dutch manager presented himself as a strict manager and from his first days on the yellow-black bench and punished various players in order to impose himself in the locker rooms. The expectations in his person were high, but his term at AEK was crowned with absolute failure. AEK faced many problems beyond the financial ones. Thomas Mavros was suffering from injuries and Márton Esterházy was in bad condition. In addition, AEK started the championship with 3 points deducted, from a punishment that they "carried" from the previous season, due to the "Chrysovitsianos" case. The club continued to use the Athens Olympic Stadium as their home ground and this would be another burden throughout the season.

AEK started the Championship badly. Even though they prevailed in difficult grounds, such as Aris Stadium and Alkazar Stadium, they won at home only once against PAS Giannina in the 2nd matchday. It was noteworthy that it took five months to win again at home. In the UEFA Cup, AEK were unlucky since they were drawn against Internazionale of Giovanni Trapattoni with players such as Pasarella, Rummenigge and Bergomi. In the first match at San Siro, AEK stood with the demands and surprised by their performance, especially in the first half during which they had the opportunity to score a goal. However, in the second half, they conceded the two goals that shaped the final result, in a match that was attended by about 1,000 Greek fans. In Athens, Inter took the lead very quickly and ended the qualifying case. However, the players of AEK tried their best and had two opportunities in the first half, while in the second there was a significant improvement with the creation of several dangerous chances, but without scoring a goal. At the end of the first half, the Swedish referee, Eriksson did not count AEK's goal, as he whistled for half time in a corner kick while the ball was midair and fractions of a second before the ball reached the net, to everyone's surprise, which fruistrated the supporters.

In the Cup, AEK exceeded the obstacle of Olympiacos Volos in the first round, but were eliminated at the next round by Panionios at the extra time. Fafié was fired in December and would take over the bench of the only team he ever won at home. Furthermore in another game of fate for the AEK, they were defeated by their former manager in the game of the second round at Ioannina.

In one of the worst choices in his presidency, Zafiropoulos entrusted the technical leadership of AEK to Nikos Alefantos. In the winter transfer window they were strengthened with Rajko Janjanin, from OFI. At the same time, however, Esterházy left for Panathinaikos and Ballis returned to Aris. The team continued their instability in their performances until the end of one of the worst seasons in their history. The fans were running out of patience for a long time and found the opportunity to break out on 11 April, in the home game against Apollon Kalamarias. The match was at the 80th minute and AEK were ahead by 2–0, when Alefantos provocatively subbed off Thomas Mavros, who had returned after many months of injury, resulting in the supporters turning against the manager and the president. In the press conference of the match, Alefantos spoke out against Mavros, considering him "finished" as a footballer. All that in combination with the unjustified tolerance of the administration, led to the departure of Mavros from the team as a result of which that would be his final match at AEK. Shortly after, Alefantos was sacked and AEK finished the season with Nikos Christidis as an interim manager. In the last three matchdays of the league, AEK did compete along with 11 other clubs in the strike declared by the Footballers' Union. The result of their participation in the strike was the deduction of 6 points, which in the end did not affect the final standings. Eventually, AEK finished at the 7th place, 30 points behind the champions Olympiacos. Theologis Papadopoulos, Stelios Manolas and Jim Patikas were the players whose performances stood out, in a very bad season for the club.

== Management team ==
Position	Staff
Manager	(Greece) Nikos Christidis
Goalkeeping coach	(Greece) Stelios Serafidis
Academy manager	(Greece) Giorgos Karafeskos
Head of Medical	(Greece) Lakis Nikolaou

== Players ==
=== Squad information ===
NOTE: The players are the ones that have been announced by the AEK Athens' press release. No edits should be made unless a player arrival or exit is announced. Updated 7 June 1987, 23:59 UTC+3.

Player	Nat.	Position(s)	Date of birth (Age)	Signed	Previous club	Transfer fee	Contract until
Goalkeepers
Spyros Ikonomopoulos	(Greece)	GK	25 July 1959 (aged 27)	1979	(Greece) AEK Athens U20	—	1989
Theologis Papadopoulos (Vice-captain)	(Greece)	GK	12 January 1960 (aged 27)	1984	(Greece) AEL	₯9,000,000	1989
Defenders
Makis Chatzis	(Greece)	RB / LB	30 March 1957 (aged 30)	1984	(Greece) Apollon Athens	₯6,750,000	1989
Panagiotis Stylianopoulos	(Greece)	RB / LB / RM / DM	4 September 1957 (aged 29)	1978	(Greece) AEK Athens U20	—	1988
Ilias Armodoros	(Greece)	LB / DM	25 January 1960 (aged 27)	1985	(Greece) Ethnikos Piraeus	Free	1990
Takis Karagiozopoulos	(Greece)	CB / DM / ST	4 February 1961 (aged 26)	1981	(Greece) Veria	₯8,000,000	1991
Polyvios Chatzopoulos	(Greece)	CB / DM	17 July 1961 (aged 25)	1985	(Greece) Panionios	₯10,400,000	1990
Stelios Manolas	(Greece)	CB / RB	13 July 1961 (aged 25)	1980	(Greece) AEK Athens U20	—	1989
Giorgos Peppes	(Greece)	CB	26 October 1961 (aged 25)	1986	(Greece) Ethnikos Piraeus	₯10,000,000	1991
Sotiris Mavrodimos	(Greece)	CB / DM / RB / LB	18 July 1962 (aged 24)	1986	(Greece) Kozani	₯5,500,000	1991
Christos Vasilopoulos	(Greece)	RB / LB	12 November 1962 (aged 24)	1986	(Greece) Panachaiki	₯8,000,000	1991
Stefanos Porfyris	(Greece)	CB	2 September 1965 (aged 21)	1985	(Greece) AEK Athens U20	—	1990
Midfielders
Rajko Janjanin	(Socialist Federal Republic of Yugoslavia)	CM / AM / DM	18 January 1957 (aged 30)	1986	(Greece) OFI	Free	1988
Pavlos Dimitriou	(Greece)	AM / LM / LB	24 March 1957 (aged 30)	1985	(Greece) Panserraikos	₯11,000,000	1989
Dimitris Pittas	(Greece)	AM / SS / CM	8 April 1958 (aged 29)	1986	(Greece) PAOK	Free	1989
Pavlos Papaioannou	(Greece) (Brazil)	DM / RB / LB / RM	19 May 1959 (aged 28)	1983	(Greece) Rodos	₯10,000,000	1988
Nikos Pias	(Greece)	CM / DM	7 April 1960 (aged 27)	1984	(Greece) Rodos	₯1,350,000	1989
Lampros Georgiadis	(Greece)	LM / AM / LB	11 July 1963 (aged 23)	1986	(Greece) Anagennisi Arta	₯11,000,000	1991
Jim Patikas	(Australia) (Greece)	RM / LM / RW / LW / SS	18 October 1963 (aged 23)	1985	(Australia) Sydney Croatia	₯5,000,000	1988
Forwards
Thomas Mavros (Captain)	(Greece)	ST / LW	31 May 1954 (aged 33)	1976	(Greece) Panionios	₯10,000,000	1987
Håkan Sandberg	(Sweden)	ST	27 July 1958 (aged 28)	1984	(Sweden) IFK Göteborg	₯8,000,000	1988
Andreas Voitsidis	(Greece)	ST / RW / LW	28 April 1960 (aged 27)	1984	(Greece) Kastoria	₯2,400,000	1989
Giannis Dintsikos	(Greece)	ST / SS / RW / LW / AM	25 June 1960 (aged 27)	1981	(Greece) Kastoria	₯20,000,000	1991
Georgios Christodoulou	(Greece)	ST / SS / LW	20 May 1967 (aged 20)	1985	(Greece) Akratitos	Free	1988
Left during Winter Transfer Window
Vasilios Georgopoulos	(Greece)	AM / RM / LM / SS / RW / LW	15 March 1956 (aged 31)	1986	(Greece) Panionios	Free	1988
Dinos Ballis	(Greece)	AM / CM / DM / SS / ST / CB	25 May 1957 (aged 30)	1981	(Greece) Aris	₯17,000,000	1991
Babis Akrivopoulos	(Greece)	AM / RM / LM / SS / ST	4 September 1961 (aged 25)	1983	(Greece) Veria	₯8,400,000	1988
Dimitris Stafylidis	(Greece)	CM	1 January 1965 (aged 22)	1985	(Greece) AEK Athens U20	—	1988
Márton Esterházy	(Hungary)	SS / AM / ST / RW / LW / RM / LM	9 April 1956 (aged 31)	1984	(Hungary) Honvéd	₯22,950,000	1986
From Reserve Squad
Panagiotis Savvidis	(Greece)	GK	12 August 1968 (aged 18)	—	(Greece) AEK Athens U20	—	
Antonis Sideris	(Greece)	RB	20 January 1967 (aged 20)	—	(Greece) AEK Athens U20	—	
Dimitris Volonakis	(Greece) (Australia)	LB / CB	27 February 1967 (aged 20)	—	(Greece) Kalymnikos	—	
Giorgos Markou	(Greece)	CB	1 March 1967 (aged 20)	—	(Greece) Atromitos U17	—	
Babis Vafiadis	(Greece)	CB	1967 (aged 19–20)	—	(Greece) AEK Athens U20	—	
Charalampos Zarotiadis	(Greece)	CM / AM / SS	28 April 1968 (aged 19)	—	(Greece) AEK Athens U20	—	
Nikos Kotzabasakis	(Greece)	DM	1967 (aged 19–20)	—	(Greece) AEK Athens U20	—	
Andreas Anagnostopoulos	(Greece)	CM	1967 (aged 19–20)	—	(Greece) AEK Athens U20	—	
Giorgos Dimitriadis	(Greece)	CM	1967 (aged 19–20)	—	(Greece) AEK Athens U20	—	
Dimitris Dimitriadis	(Greece)	CM	21 March 1968 (aged 19)	—	(Greece) AEK Athens U20	—	
Giannis Giannitsis	(Greece)	ST	1967 (aged 19–20)	—	(Greece) AEK Athens U20	—	
Giannis Tzogias	(Greece)	ST	1967 (aged 19–20)	—	(Greece) AEK Athens U20	—	
Babis Marangos	(Greece)	ST	28 August 1968 (aged 18)	—	(Greece) AEK Athens U20	—	

== Transfers ==
=== In ===
==== Summer ====
Pos.	Player	From	Fee	Date	Contract Until	Source
DF	(Greece) Sotiris Mavrodimos	(Greece) Kozani	₯5,500,000^{[a]}	14 July 1986	30 June 1991	
DF	(Greece) Dimos Tsimiliotis	(Greece) Acharnaikos	Loan return	1 July 1986	30 June 1989	
DF	(Greece) Christos Vasilopoulos	(Greece) Panachaiki	₯8,000,000	27 June 1986	30 June 1991	
MF	(Greece) Lampros Georgiadis	(Greece) Anagennisi Arta	₯11,000,000^{[b]}	14 July 1986	30 June 1991	
MF	(Greece) Vasilios Georgopoulos	(Greece) Panionios	Free transfer	15 July 1986	30 June 1988	
FW	(Greece) Michalis Pytharoulis	(Greece) Vyzas Megara	Loan return	1 July 1986	30 June 1989	

==== Winter ====
Pos.	Player	From	Fee	Date	Contract Until	Source
DF	(Greece) Giorgos Peppes	(Greece) Ethnikos Piraeus	₯10,000,000	1 December 1986	30 November 1991	
MF	(Socialist Federal Republic of Yugoslavia) Rajko Janjanin	(Greece) OFI	Free transfer	1 December 1986	30 November 1988	
MF	(Greece) Dimitris Pittas	(Greece) PAOK	Free transfer	12 December 1986	30 November 1988	

=== Out ===
==== Summer ====
Pos.	Player	To	Fee	Date	Source
DF	(Greece) Dimos Tsimiliotis	(Greece) Acharnaikos	Contract termination	1 July 1986	

==== Winter ====
Pos.	Player	To	Fee	Date	Source
MF	(Greece) Dinos Ballis	(Greece) Aris	Contract termination	15 December 1986	
MF	(Greece) Vasilios Georgopoulos	(Greece) Kalamata	Contract termination	19 December 1986	
MF	(Greece) Babis Akrivopoulos	(Greece) Veria	Contract termination	15 December 1986	
FW	(Hungary) Márton Esterházy	(Greece) Panathinaikos	End of contract	3 December 1986	

=== Loan out ===
==== Summer ====
Pos.	Player	To	Fee	Date	Until	Option to buy	Source
FW	(Greece) Michalis Pytharoulis	(Greece) Fostiras	Free	28 July 1986	30 June 1987	✗	

==== Winter ====
Pos.	Player	To	Fee	Date	Until	Option to buy	Source
MF	(Greece) Dimitris Stafylidis	(Greece) Pannafpliakos	Free	28 November 1986	30 November 1987	✗	

Notes

a. 4,000,000 in cash, 1,500,000 in sports material and the incomes from an arranged friendly match between the two clubs.

b. 8,500,000 in cash, 1,500,000 in sports material and 1,000,000 from the incomes from an arranged friendly match between the two clubs.

=== Contract renewals ===
Pos.	Player	Date	Former Exp. Date	New Exp. Date	Source
DF	(Greece) Panagiotis Stylianopoulos	2 July 1986	30 June 1986	30 June 1988	
MF	(Greece) Dinos Ballis	15 July 1986	30 June 1986	30 June 1991	

=== Overall transfer activity ===
==== Expenditure ====
Summer: ▼ ₯34,500,000

Winter: ▼ ₯10,000,000

Total: ▼ ₯44,500,000

==== Income ====
Summer: ▲ ₯0

Winter: ▲ ₯0

Total: ▲ ₯0

==== Net Totals ====
Total: ▼ ₯34,500,000

Winter: ₯10,000,000

Total: ▼ ₯44,500,000

== Pre-season and friendlies ==
30 July 1986 Friendly	TSV Roth	0–7	AEK Athens	Stuttgart
19:00 EEST (UTC+3)		Report	Esterházy 2', 20'; Stylianopoulos 30'; Sandberg 56', 60', 77'; Voitsidis 82'

1 August 1986 Friendly	FSV Lauta	5–5	AEK Athens	Stuttgart
18:00 EEST (UTC+3)	Kermalstel 69', 75', 84'; Vettel 76'; Mayer 87'	Report	Pias 29'; Sandberg 32', 55'; Voitsidis 66'; Patikas 74'

3 August 1986 Friendly	TV Darmsheim	1–7	AEK Athens	Stuttgart
17:00 EEST (UTC+3)	7'	Report	Karagiozopoulos 8', 22' (pen.); Chatzopoulos 39', 51'; Georgiadis 46', 69', 71'	Attendance: 1,000

5 August 1986 Friendly	SV 98 Schwetzingen	2–1	AEK Athens	Stuttgart
19:00 EEST (UTC+3)	Hillerbad 60'; Krupa 77'	Report	Sandberg 46'

8 August 1986 Friendly	FC 07 Furtwangen	0–3	AEK Athens	Stuttgart
19:00 EEST (UTC+3)		Report	Sandberg 50'; Esterházy 56'; Manolas 68'

10 August 1986 Friendly	TuS Blumberg	0–11	AEK Athens	Stuttgart
17:00 EEST (UTC+3)		Report	Esterházy 3', 36', 41', 56'; Manolas 4'; Sandberg 6'; Patikas 10', 22', 43'; Mavrodimos 58'; Georgiadis 65'

16 August 1986 Friendly	Olympiacos Chalkida	1–3	AEK Athens	Chalkida
17:00 EEST (UTC+3)	Karatzas 38'	Report	Georgiadis 3'; Ballis 8'; Papaioannou 87'	Stadium: Municipal Stadium of Chalkida; Attendance: 3,500; Referee: Ilias Thalassis (Euboea)

18 August 1986 Friendly	AEK Athens	3–2	Raba ETO Gyor	Marousi
21:00 EEST (UTC+3)	Ballis 62', (yellow card) 68'; Sandberg 66'; Georgiadis 77'	Report	Szentes 6'; Preszeller 21'	Stadium: Olympic Stadium; Attendance: 12,873; Referee: Makis Germanakos (Athens)

21 August 1986 Friendly	AEK Athens	2–1	Panathinaikos	Marousi
21:30 EEST (UTC+3)	Sandberg 17', 39'; Manolas (yellow card) 74'	Report	Batsinilas 74' (pen.)	Stadium: Olympic Stadium; Attendance: 38,080; Referee: Kostas Adamopoulos (Athens)
Note: Friendly match as part of the transfer of Vangelis Vlachos.

25 August 1986 Friendly	AEK Athens	1–1	Olympiacos	Marousi
21:30 EEST (UTC+3)	Chatzopoulos (yellow card); Sandberg (yellow card) 28', (goal) 31'	Report	Xanthopoulos (yellow card); Mitropoulos 11', (yellow card); Šestić (yellow card) 42'	Stadium: Olympic Stadium; Attendance: 57,334; Referee: Stratos Kannos (Athens)
Note: Friendly match as part of the transfer of Christos Arvanitis.

27 August 1986 Friendly	Kozani	2–3	AEK Athens	Kozani
17:00 EEST (UTC+3)	Alexiadis 21'; Tsakiridis 25'	Report	Manolas 23'; Sandberg (penalty missed) , 40'; G. Dintsikos 53'; Armodoros 75'	Stadium: Kozani Stadium; Referee: Pardalis
Note: Friendly match as part of the transfer of Sotiris Mavrodimos.

31 August 1986 Friendly	Anagennisi Arta	0–2	AEK Athens	Arta
18:00 EEST (UTC+3)	Dovas (penalty missed) , 65'	Report	Voitsidis 18'; Georgiadis 78'	Stadium: Arta Stadium; Referee: Vassilios Nikakis (Aetoloacarnania)
Note: Friendly match as part of the transfer of Lampros Georgiadis.

10 October 1986 Friendly	Acharnaikos	1–3	AEK Athens	Acharnes
15:00 EEST (UTC+3)	Kokkinopoulos 4'	Report	Dimitriou 10'; Mavros 24'; Georgiadis 66'	Stadium: Acharnes Stadium; Referee: Giannis Batras (Karditsa)

14 October 1986 Friendly	A.O. Kifisia	0–3	AEK Athens	Kifissia
15:00 EEST (UTC+3)		Report	Patikas 4'; Mavros 19', 56' (pen.)	Stadium: Zirineio Stadium; Referee: Niarchos

21 October 1986 Friendly	Fostiras	1–2	AEK Athens	Tavros
15:00 EEST (UTC+3)	Mamonas 87' (pen.)	Report	Christodoulou 9'; Vafiadis 63'	Stadium: Tavros Stadium; Referee: Thanasis Mantas (Athens)

11 November 1986 Friendly	Atromitos	1–1	AEK Athens	Peristeri
15:00 EET (UTC+2)	Bolakis 16'	Report	Christodoulou 48'	Stadium: Peristeri Stadium; Referee: Stavros Misailidis
Note: The referee was a footballer of Paniliakos.

15 November 1986 Friendly	Fostiras	0–7	AEK Athens	Tavros
15:00 EET (UTC+2)		Report	Pias 17', 59', 88'; Karagiozopoulos 19' (pen.); Mavrodimos 45'; Georgiadis 46'; Genintogian 82' (o.g.)	Stadium: Tavros Stadium; Attendance: 1,000; Referee: Sevos

2 December 1986 Friendly	Panelefsiniakos	0–4	AEK Athens	Elefsina
15:00 EET (UTC+2)		Report	Pias 28'; Armodoros 33'; Sandberg 38'; Marangos 75'	Stadium: Municipal Stadium of Elefsina; Attendance: 1,000; Referee: Giorgos Roumeliotis
Note: The referee for the match was originally Kostas Dimitriadis, but he couldn't show up and the match was eventually refereed by the former footballer of Panelefsiniakos, Giorgos Roumeliotis.

9 December 1986 Friendly	Kallithea	3–0	AEK Athens	Kallithea
15:00 EET (UTC+2)	Korres 6'; Sfyris 25'; Korobelis 37'	Report		Stadium: Grigoris Lambrakis Stadium; Referee: Christos Kolokythas (Athens)

24 December 1986 Friendly	Atromitos	2–0	AEK Athens	Peristeri
15:00 EET (UTC+2)	Kottis (pen.); Georgoulis	Report		Stadium: Peristeri Stadium

21 January 1987 Friendly	A.O. Kifisia	1–3	AEK Athens	Kifissia
15:00 EET (UTC+2)	Petridis 29'	Report	Pittas 30'; Stylianopoulos 37'; Christodoulou 84'	Stadium: Zirineio Stadium; Referee: Lampros Georgiadis
Note: The referee of the match was originally Kostas Akridas, but he and his staff refused to come out, as the sports cards of the players of AEK were not submitted. Thus, the footballer of AEK, Georgiadis took over as the referee in his place.

28 January 1987 Friendly	AEK Athens	6–1	Asteras Exarchion	Vouliagmeni
16:00 EET (UTC+2)	Mavros 14', 23', 27'; Koutoulas 20'; Karagiozopoulos 57'; Voitsidis 60'	Report	Lepeniotis 25'	Stadium: Vouliagmeni Stadium
Note: AEK finished the match with 10 players due to departure of Armodoros at the 70th minute due to injury.

11 February 1987 Friendly	Acharnaikos	2–1	AEK Athens	Acharnes
15:30 EET (UTC+2)	A. Drosos (penalty missed) 43'; Angelidis 46'; Karapatakis 73'	Report	Papaioannou 19'	Stadium: Acharnes Stadium; Referee: Inglesis
Note: The referee of the match was the assistant coach of Acharnaikos, Inglesis.

28 April 1987 Friendly	AEK Athens	10–0	Neopentelikos	Marousi
	Sandberg 12', 13', 24'; Pittas 29', 23'; Patikas 53', 65'; Mavrodimos 55'; Vafiadis 81'; Stylianopoulos 82'	Report		Stadium: Olympic Stadium

9 May 1987 Friendly	Fostiras	2–7	AEK Athens	Tavros
17:30 EEST (UTC+3)	Pytharoulis 43'; Dimitriadis 80'	Report	Karagiozopoulos 13', 16', 36'; Sandberg 27'; Dintsikos 35'; Christodoulou 52'; Pittas 83'	Stadium: Tavros Stadium; Referee: Nikos Karamanlis
Note: The referee of the match was the manager of Fostiras, Nikos Karmanlis.

2 June 1987 Friendly	Panelefsiniakos	1–5	AEK Athens	Elefsina
17:30 EEST (UTC+3)	Golemis 51'	Report	Mavros 20'; Sandberg 21', 45'; Janjanin 64'; Dintsikos 75'	Stadium: Municipal Stadium of Elefsina; Referee: Spyros Ikonomopoulos
Note: The referee of the match for the first half was the goalkeeper of AEK, Ikonomopoulos and for the second half he was replaced by Michalis Kanavas.

== Competitions ==
=== Overall record ===
Competition	First match	Last match	Starting round	Final position	Record							
Competition	First match	Last match	Starting round	Final position	Pld	W	D	L	GF	GA	GD	Win %
Alpha Ethniki	7 September 1986	7 June 1987	Matchday 1	7th	30	10	8	12	31	26	+5	33.33
Greek Cup	19 November 1986	17 December 1986	First round	Additional round	2	1	0	1	1	1	+0	50.00
UEFA Cup	17 September 1986	2 October 1986	First round	First round	2	0	0	2	0	3	−3	0.00
Total					34	11	8	15	32	30	+2	32.35

Last updated: 7 June 1987
Source: Competitions

=== Alpha Ethniki ===
==== League table ====
Pos	Team	Pld	W	D	L	GF	GA	GD	Pts
5	PAOK	30	13	9	8	39	23	+16	29
6	Iraklis	30	13	5	12	34	32	+2	25
7	AEK Athens	30	10	8	12	31	26	+5	19
8	AEL	30	10	5	15	24	31	−7	19
9	Veria	30	10	5	15	30	43	−13	19

Source: RSSSF
Rules for classification: 1st points; 2nd head-to-head points; 3rd head-to-head goal difference; 4th decision match.
12 clubs went on strike in the last three matchdays. All the clubs exept Olympiacos, Panathinaikos, OFI and Panionios that did not joined the strike were punished, with a deduction of -6 points because they did not show up. AEK Athens had also -3 points because of a case of fixing games in the previous season.

==== Results summary ====
Overall								Home						Away					
Pld	W	D	L	GF	GA	GD	Pts	W	D	L	GF	GA	GD	W	D	L	GF	GA	GD
30	10	8	12	31	26	+5	19	6	3	6	18	13	+5	4	5	6	13	13	0

Source: Competitive matches

==== Results by Matchday ====
Round	1	2	3	4	5	6	7	8	9	10	11	12	13	14	15	16	17	18	19	20	21	22	23	24	25	26	27	28	29	30
Ground	A	H	H	A	H	A	H	A	H	A	A	H	A	H	A	H	A	A	H	A	H	A	H	A	H	H	A	H	A	H
Result	D	W	D	L	D	W	L	W	L	W	D	L	W	W	D	D	L	D	W	D	W	L	W	L	W	L	L	L	L	L
Position	16	15	14	14	15	13	12	11	13	10	11	11	10	7	8	8	8	9	7	7	7	7	7	7	7	7	7	7	7	7

Source: Competitive matches
A = Away; H = Home; W = Win; D = Draw; L = Loss; P = Postponed

==== Matches ====
7 September 1986 1	Panionios	1–1	AEK Athens	Nea Smyrni
	Minasian (yellow card) 32'; Parelis 79'		Dimitriadis (yellow card) 2', (goal) 23'; Tzogias (yellow card) 40' (yellow-red card) 77'; Volonakis (yellow card) 44'	Stadium: Nea Smyrni Stadium; Attendance: 7,000; Referee: Makis Germanakos (Athens)
Note: Due to a strike of professional footballers, both clubs competed with amateur footballers.

14 September 1986 2	AEK Athens	2–1	PAS Giannina	Marousi
17:00 EEST (UTC+3)	Patikas 6'; Mavrodimos 73'		Maipas 42'	Stadium: Olympic Stadium; Attendance: 24,899; Referee: Thanasis Mantas (Athens)

20 September 1986 3	AEK Athens	1–1	Doxa Drama	Marousi
18:30 EEST (UTC+3)	Armodoros (yellow card) 16'; Sandberg 80'		Gampetas (yellow card) 40'; Valchev 76'	Stadium: Olympic Stadium; Attendance: 14,654; Referee: Giorgos Amygdalis (Serres)

28 September 1986 4	Ethnikos Piraeus	1–0	AEK Athens	Piraeus
15:30 EEST (UTC+3)	Papoulias (yellow card) 12'; Batista 46', (yellow card) 70'; Georgaras (yellow card) 86'		Papaioannou (yellow card) 21' (yellow-red card) 33'; Mavrodimos (yellow card) 74'	Stadium: Karaiskakis Stadium; Attendance: 17,600; Referee: Stefanos Tsirikidis (Thessaloniki)

5 October 1986 5	AEK Athens	2–2	Apollon Athens	Marousi
15:30 EEST (UTC+3)	Karagiozopoulos (yellow card); Chatzopoulos (yellow card) 10'; Dimitriou 46'; Pias 49'		Svoronos (yellow card); Mangioros (yellow card); Loukas 15'; Karanikas 21'	Stadium: Olympic Stadium; Attendance: 11,276; Referee: Periklis Vasilakis (Athens)

26 October 1986 6	Aris	1–3	AEK Athens	Thessaloniki
15:00 EET (UTC+2)	Dimitriadis 69'; Chatzinikolaou (yellow card) 89'		Sandberg (yellow card) 19'; Esterházy 33', 84'; Chatzis (yellow card) 34'; Karagiozopoulos (yellow card) 37'; Georgiadis 59'	Stadium: Aris Stadium; Attendance: 9,477; Referee: Theodoros Kefalas (Athens)

2 November 1986 7	AEK Athens	0–1	Olympiacos	Marousi
15:00 EET (UTC+2)	Papaioannou (yellow card)		Xanthopoulos 75'	Stadium: Olympic Stadium; Attendance: 43,506; Referee: Antonis Vassaras (Thessaloniki)

24 November 1986 8	AEL	0–1	AEK Athens	Larissa
14:45 EET (UTC+2)	Tsiolis (yellow card) 70'		Pias (yellow card) 80'; Patikas 88'	Stadium: Alcazar Stadium; Attendance: 8,891; Referee: Stefanos Tsirikidis (Thessaloniki)

6 December 1986 9	AEK Athens	1–2	PAOK	Marousi
16:00 EET (UTC+2)	Patikas 8'; Chatzopoulos (yellow card) 22'		Baniotis (yellow card); Alexandridis 2'; Malioufas 30'	Stadium: Olympic Stadium; Attendance: 18,349; Referee: Makis Germanakos (Athens)

14 December 1986 10	Apollon Kalamarias	0–2	AEK Athens	Thessaloniki
16:00 EET (UTC+2)	Vazakas (yellow card); Konstantinidis (yellow card); Iosifidis (yellow card); Kousoulakis (yellow card)		Voitsidis (yellow card); Karagiozopoulos 28' (pen.), (yellow card); Papaioannou 34'	Stadium: Kalamaria Stadium; Referee: Stelios Charlavanis (Euboea)

21 December 1986 11	Panathinaikos	1–1	AEK Athens	Marousi
14:45 EET (UTC+2)	Georgakopoulos (yellow card); Patsiavouras (yellow card) 75'; Batsinilas 87' (pen.)		Sandberg (yellow card); Chatzopoulos (yellow card); Mavrodimos (yellow card); Georgiadis 56'	Stadium: Olympic Stadium; Attendance: 37,452; Referee: Periklis Vasilakis (Athens)

28 December 1986 12	AEK Athens	0–1	OFI	Marousi
14:45 EET (UTC+2)	Mavrodimos (yellow card) 16'		Charalampidis 50'	Stadium: Olympic Stadium; Attendance: 12,800; Referee: Giorgos Koukoulas (Lesbos)

4 January 1987 13	Iraklis	1–3	AEK Athens	Thessaloniki
14:45 EET (UTC+2)	Karaiskos (yellow card) 23'; Anastasiadis 59' (pen.); Maloumidis (yellow card) 60'; Zifkas (yellow card) 68'		Pias (yellow card) 15', (goal) 89'; Karagiozopoulos (yellow card) 23'; Manolas (yellow card) 25'; Georgiadis 68'; Sandberg 85'	Stadium: Kaftanzoglio Stadium; Attendance: 8,403; Referee: Tasos Kantartzis (Thessaloniki)

18 January 1987 14	AEK Athens	5–0	Veria	Marousi
14:45 EET (UTC+2)	Patikas 8'; Dintsikos 43'; Sandberg (penalty missed) 52', 82'; Papaioannou 52'; Pias 56'		Terzopoulos (yellow card) 19'; Jakubec (yellow card) 51'	Stadium: Olympic Stadium; Attendance: 16,530; Referee: Nikos Kapetanakis (Piraeus)

25 January 1987 15	Diagoras	0–0	AEK Athens	Rhodes
14:45 EET (UTC+2)			Armodoros (yellow card) 76'	Stadium: Diagoras Stadium; Attendance: 6,500; Referee: Giannis Batras (Karditsa)

1 February 1987 16	AEK Athens	1–1	Panionios	Marousi
15:00 EET (UTC+2)	Janjanin (penalty missed) 15'; Papaioannou (yellow card) 46'; Patikas 69'		Pavlopoulos 48'	Stadium: Olympic Stadium; Attendance: 21,212; Referee: Antonis Vassaras (Thessaloniki)

8 February 1987 17	PAS Giannina	2–0	AEK Athens	Ioannina
15:00 EET (UTC+2)	Apostolov 10' (pen.), 45' (pen.); Lampidis (yellow card) 25'; Lappas (yellow card) 26' (yellow-red card) 26'; Pasialis (yellow card) 54'		Papaioannou (yellow card) 26'; Chatzopoulos (yellow card) 55'	Stadium: Zosimades Stadium; Attendance: 9,652; Referee: Stelios Charlavanis (Euboea)

15 February 1987 18	Doxa Drama	1–1	AEK Athens	Drama
15:00 EET (UTC+2)	Vasilakakis (yellow card) 28'; Yfantidis 41'		Dintsikos 27'; Chatzopoulos (yellow card) 61'; Peppes (yellow card) 89'	Stadium: Doxa Drama Stadium; Attendance: 2,569; Referee: Giannis Triantafyllou (Dodecanese)

21 February 1987 19	AEK Athens	2–1	Ethnikos Piraeus	Marousi
16:00 EET (UTC+2)	Stylianopoulos 26'; Janjanin 27' (pen.)		Katsikogiannis (yellow card) 33'; Dimitropoulos 90+1'	Stadium: Olympic Stadium; Attendance: 15,735; Referee: Kyriakos Kontogiannidis (Thrace)

13 March 1988 20	Apollon Athens	1–1	AEK Athens	Rizoupoli
15:30 EET (UTC+2)	Karanikas (yellow card) 14', (goal) 43'; Karavelis (yellow card) 53'; Fabiatos (red card) 79'; Pantelidis (yellow card) 88'		Chatzis (yellow card) 43'; Papadopoulos (yellow card) 43'; Dintsikos 55'	Stadium: Rizoupoli Stadium; Attendance: 7,850; Referee: Dimitris Daoulas (Aetoloacarnania)
Note: At the 76th minute, Mavrodimos and Fabiatos in order to the claim of the ball collided very harsh in the air. Mavrodimos was left unconscious for two minutes and for 30 seconds wasn't showing any vital signs. The match was interrupted for a few minutes in order for Mavrodimos to being given the first aid and to be transferred to the hospital.

8 March 1987 21	AEK Athens	1–0	Aris	Marousi
15:30 EET (UTC+2)	Manolas 48', (yellow card) 85'; Karagiozopoulos (yellow card) 88'		Males (yellow card) 68'	Stadium: Olympic Stadium; Attendance: 10,894; Referee: Kostas Kortsaris (Thessaloniki)

15 March 1987 22	Olympiacos	2–0	AEK Athens	Marousi
15:30 EET (UTC+2)	Zelelidis (yellow card); Vaitsis 76'; Kostikos 90'			Stadium: Olympic Stadium; Attendance: 43,678; Referee: Nikos Andreou (Athens)

28 March 1987 23	AEK Athens	1–0	AEL	Marousi
16:00 EET (UTC+2)	Manolas (yellow card) 54'; Dintsikos (yellow card) 75'; Karagiozopoulos 78' (pen.)		Tsiolis (yellow card) 41'; Kyrilidis (yellow card) 78'	Stadium: Olympic Stadium; Attendance: 10,995; Referee: Stelios Charlavanis (Euboea)

5 April 1987 24	PAOK	1–0	AEK Athens	Thessaloniki
16:30 EEST (UTC+3)	Sandberg (yellow card) 28'; Vasilakos 58'			Stadium: Toumba Stadium; Attendance: 14,167; Referee: Tasos Kantartzis (Thessaloniki)

11 April 1987 25	AEK Athens	2–0	Apollon Kalamarias	Marousi
17:00 EEST (UTC+3)	Janjanin 31'; Patikas (yellow card) 45'; Karagiozopoulos 54' (pen.); Peppes (yellow card) 66'		Konstantinidis (yellow card) 23'	Stadium: Olympic Stadium; Attendance: 6,896; Referee: Stratos Kannos (Athens)
Note: Last game for Thomas Mavros with AEK Athens.

3 May 1987 26	AEK Athens	0–3	Panathinaikos	Marousi
17:00 EEST (UTC+3)	Papaioannou (yellow card) 78'		Saravakos 1'; Karavidas 73'; Batsinilas 77'	Stadium: Olympic Stadium; Attendance: 36,456; Referee: Antonis Vassaras (Thessaloniki)
Note: Due to his two-month ban off the pitch, Alefantos he managed from the stands while his assistant Nikos Christidis sat on the bench.

17 May 1987 27	OFI	1–0	AEK Athens	Heraklion
17:30 EEST (UTC+3)	Mitseas (yellow card) 16'; Charalampidis 65'		Georgiadis (yellow card) 28'; Armodoros (yellow card) 30'; Karagiozopoulos (yellow card) 56'	Stadium: Ergotelis Stadium; Attendance: 9,802; Referee: Periklis Vasilakis (Athens)

24 May 1987 28	AEK Athens	0–0	Iraklis	Marousi
				Stadium: Olympic Stadium
Note: Not played since because both clubs were on strike and were counted as loss counted for each team with the score at 0–0.

31 May 1987 29	Veria	0–0	AEK Athens	Veria
				Stadium: Veria Stadium
Note: Not played since because both clubs were on strike and were counted as loss counted for each team with the score at 0–0.

7 June 1987 30	AEK Athens	0–0	Diagoras	Marousi
				Stadium: Olympic Stadium
Note: Not played since because both clubs were on strike and were counted as loss counted for each team with the score at 0–0.

=== Greek Cup ===
==== Matches ====
19 November 1986 First round	Olympiacos Volos	0–1	AEK Athens	Volos
14:30 EET (UTC+2)	Tsoukalas (yellow card); Dadakos (yellow card) 69'	Report	Georgiadis 78'	Stadium: Volos Municipal Stadium; Attendance: 6,000; Referee: Isaak Bouroutzoglou (Pieria)

17 December 1986 Additional round	Panionios	1–0 (a.e.t.)	AEK Athens	Nea Smyrni
14:45 EET (UTC+2)	Owen (yellow card) 66', (goal) 108'; Papachristopoulos (yellow card) 81'; Manikas (yellow card) 88'	Report	Chatzis (yellow card) 66'; Georgiadis (yellow card) 82'	Stadium: Nea Smyrni Stadium; Attendance: 8,156; Referee: Antonis Vassaras (Thessaloniki)

=== UEFA Cup ===
==== First round ====
17 September 1986 First leg	Internazionale (Italy)	2–0	(Greece) AEK Athens	Milan, Italy
21:30 EEST (UTC+3)	Ferri (yellow card) 28'; Altobelli 58'; Rummenigge 79'	Report	Manolas (yellow card) 7'	Stadium: Stadio Giuseppe Meazza; Attendance: 49,055; Referee: Marcel Van Langenhove (Belgium)

2 October 1986 Second leg	AEK Athens (Greece)	0–1 (0–3 agg.)	(Italy) Internazionale	Athens, Greece
20:00 EEST (UTC+3)	Pias (yellow card) 73'; Chatzopoulos (yellow card) 79'	Report	Passarella 8'	Stadium: Athens Olympic Stadium; Attendance: 55,186; Referee: Ulf Eriksson (Sweden)

== Statistics ==
=== Squad statistics ===
As of 7 June 1987

No.	Pos	Player	Alpha Ethniki		Greek Cup		UEFA Cup		Total	
No.	Pos	Player	Apps	Goals	Apps	Goals	Apps	Goals	Apps	Goals
Goalkeepers
—	GK	(Greece) Spyros Ikonomopoulos	0	0	0	0	0	0	0	0
—	GK	(Greece) Theologis Papadopoulos	26	0	2	0	2	0	30	0
Defenders
—	DF	(Greece) Makis Chatzis	20	0	2	0	2	0	24	0
—	DF	(Greece) Panagiotis Stylianopoulos	13	1	0	0	0	0	13	1
—	DF	(Greece) Ilias Armodoros	18	0	2	0	1	0	21	0
—	DF	(Greece) Takis Karagiozopoulos	19	3	1	0	2	0	22	3
—	DF	(Greece) Polyvios Chatzopoulos	16	0	2	0	2	0	20	0
—	DF	(Greece) Stelios Manolas	20	1	1	0	2	0	23	1
—	DF	(Greece) Giorgos Peppes	15	0	1	0	0	0	16	0
—	DF	(Greece) Sotiris Mavrodimos	12	1	2	0	1	0	15	1
—	DF	(Greece) Christos Vasilopoulos	0	0	0	0	0	0	0	0
—	DF	(Greece) Stefanos Porfyris	0	0	0	0	0	0	0	0
Midfielders
—	MF	(Socialist Federal Republic of Yugoslavia) Rajko Janjanin	16	2	0	0	0	0	16	2
—	MF	(Greece) Pavlos Dimitriou	5	1	2	0	0	0	7	1
—	MF	(Greece) Dimitris Pittas	7	0	0	0	0	0	7	0
—	MF	(Greece) Pavlos Papaioannou	24	2	1	0	2	0	27	2
—	MF	(Greece) Nikos Pias	15	3	2	0	0	0	17	3
—	MF	(Greece) Lampros Georgiadis	24	3	2	1	2	0	28	4
—	MF	(Australia) Jim Patikas	23	5	2	0	2	0	27	5
Forwards
—	FW	(Greece) Thomas Mavros	3	0	0	0	0	0	3	0
—	FW	(Sweden) Håkan Sandberg	23	3	2	0	2	0	27	3
—	FW	(Greece) Andreas Voitsidis	4	0	1	0	0	0	5	0
—	FW	(Greece) Giannis Dintsikos	18	3	0	0	0	0	18	3
—	FW	(Greece) Georgios Christodoulou	0	0	0	0	0	0	0	0
Left during Winter Transfer Window
—	MF	(Greece) Vasilios Georgopoulos	2	0	0	0	0	0	2	0
—	MF	(Greece) Dinos Ballis	3	0	0	0	0	0	3	0
—	MF	(Greece) Babis Akrivopoulos	0	0	0	0	0	0	0	0
—	MF	(Greece) Dimitris Stafylidis	0	0	0	0	0	0	0	0
—	FW	(Hungary) Márton Esterházy	6	2	0	0	2	0	8	2
From Reserve Squad
—	GK	(Greece) Panagiotis Savvidis	1	0	0	0	0	0	1	0
—	DF	(Greece) Antonis Sideris	1	0	0	0	0	0	1	0
—	DF	(Greece) Dimitris Volonakis	1	0	0	0	0	0	1	0
—	DF	(Greece) Giorgos Markou	1	0	0	0	0	0	1	0
—	DF	(Greece) Babis Vafiadis	1	0	0	0	0	0	1	0
—	MF	(Greece) Charalampos Zarotiadis	1	0	0	0	0	0	1	0
—	MF	(Greece) Nikos Kotzabasakis	1	0	0	0	0	0	1	0
—	MF	(Greece) Andreas Anagnostopoulos	1	0	0	0	0	0	1	0
—	MF	(Greece) Giorgos Dimitriadis	1	0	0	0	0	0	1	0
—	MF	(Greece) Dimitris Dimitriadis	1	1	0	0	0	0	1	1
—	FW	(Greece) Giannis Giannitsis	1	0	0	0	0	0	1	0
—	FW	(Greece) Giannis Tzogias	1	0	0	0	0	0	1	0
—	FW	(Greece) Babis Marangos	1	0	0	0	0	0	1	0

=== Goalscorers ===
As of 7 June 1987
The list is sorted by competition order when total goals are equal, then by position and then alphabetically by surname.

Rank	Pos.	Player	Alpha Ethniki	Greek Cup	UEFA Cup	Total
1	MF	(Australia) Jim Patikas	5	0	0	5
2	MF	(Greece) Lampros Georgiadis	3	1	0	4
3	DF	(Greece) Takis Karagiozopoulos	3	0	0	3
3	MF	(Greece) Nikos Pias	3	0	0	3
3	FW	(Greece) Giannis Dintsikos	3	0	0	3
3	FW	(Sweden) Håkan Sandberg	3	0	0	3
7	MF	(Greece) Pavlos Papaioannou	2	0	0	2
7	MF	(Socialist Federal Republic of Yugoslavia) Rajko Janjanin	2	0	0	2
7	FW	(Hungary) Márton Esterházy	2	0	0	2
10	DF	(Greece) Stelios Manolas	1	0	0	1
10	DF	(Greece) Sotiris Mavrodimos	1	0	0	1
10	DF	(Greece) Panagiotis Stylianopoulos	1	0	0	1
10	MF	(Greece) Dimitris Dimitriadis	1	0	0	1
10	MF	(Greece) Pavlos Dimitriou	1	0	0	1
Own goals			0	0	0	0
Totals			31	1	0	32

=== Clean sheets ===
As of 7 June 1987
The list is sorted by competition order when total clean sheets are equal and then alphabetically by surname. Clean sheets in games where both goalkeepers participated are awarded to the goalkeeper who started the game. Goalkeepers with no appearances are not included.

Rank	Player	Alpha Ethniki	Greek Cup	UEFA Cup	Total
1	(Greece) Theologis Papadopoulos	7	1	0	8
2	(Greece) Panagiotis Savvidis	0	0	0	0
Totals		7	1	0	8

=== Disciplinary record ===
As of 7 June 1987

N	P	Nat.	Name	Alpha Ethniki			Greek Cup			UEFA Cup			Total			Notes
N	P	Nat.	Name	Yellow card	Second yellow card	Red card	Yellow card	Second yellow card	Red card	Yellow card	Second yellow card	Red card	Yellow card	Second yellow card	Red card	Notes
Goalkeepers
—	GK	(Greece)	Spyros Ikonomopoulos													
—	GK	(Greece)	Theologis Papadopoulos	1									1			
Defenders
—	DF	(Greece)	Makis Chatzis	2			1						3			
—	DF	(Greece)	Panagiotis Stylianopoulos													
—	DF	(Greece)	Ilias Armodoros	3									3			
—	DF	(Greece)	Takis Karagiozopoulos	6									6			
—	DF	(Greece)	Polyvios Chatzopoulos	5						1			6			
—	DF	(Greece)	Stelios Manolas	3						1			4			
—	DF	(Greece)	Giorgos Peppes	2									2			
—	DF	(Greece)	Sotiris Mavrodimos	3									3			
—	DF	(Greece)	Christos Vasilopoulos													
—	DF	(Greece)	Stefanos Porfyris													
Midfielders
—	MF	(Socialist Federal Republic of Yugoslavia)	Rajko Janjanin													
—	MF	(Greece)	Pavlos Dimitriou													
—	MF	(Greece)	Dimitris Pittas													
—	MF	(Greece)	Pavlos Papaioannou	6	1								6	1		
—	MF	(Greece)	Nikos Pias	2						1			3			
—	MF	(Greece)	Lampros Georgiadis	1									1			
—	MF	(Australia)	Jim Patikas	1			1						2			
Forwards
—	FW	(Greece)	Thomas Mavros													
—	FW	(Sweden)	Håkan Sandberg	3									3			
—	FW	(Greece)	Andreas Voitsidis	1									1			
—	FW	(Greece)	Giannis Dintsikos	1									1			
—	FW	(Greece)	Georgios Christodoulou													
Left during Winter Transfer Window
—	MF	(Greece)	Vasilios Georgopoulos													
—	MF	(Greece)	Dinos Ballis													
—	MF	(Greece)	Babis Akrivopoulos													
—	MF	(Greece)	Dimitris Stafylidis													
—	FW	(Hungary)	Márton Esterházy													
From Reserve Squad
—	GK	(Greece)	Panagiotis Savvidis													
—	DF	(Greece)	Antonis Sideris													
—	DF	(Greece)	Dimitris Volonakis	1									1			
—	DF	(Greece)	Giorgos Markou													
—	DF	(Greece)	Babis Vafiadis													
—	MF	(Greece)	Charalampos Zarotiadis													
—	MF	(Greece)	Nikos Kotzabasakis													
—	MF	(Greece)	Andreas Anagnostopoulos													
—	MF	(Greece)	Giorgos Dimitriadis													
—	MF	(Greece)	Dimitris Dimitriadis	1									1			
—	FW	(Greece)	Giannis Giannitsis													
—	FW	(Greece)	Giannis Tzogias	2	1								2	1		
—	FW	(Greece)	Babis Marangos													

=== Starting 11 ===
This section presents the most frequently used formation along with the players with the most starts across all competitions.

N.	Formation	Matchday(s)
16	4–4–2	1–12
15	4–3–3	12–27

Nat.	Player	Pos.
(Greece)	Theologis Papadopoulos (C)	GK
(Greece)	Stelios Manolas	RCB
(Greece)	Giorgos Peppes	LCB
(Greece)	Makis Chatzis	RB
(Greece)	Ilias Armodoros	LB
(Greece)	Polyvios Chatzopoulos	DM
(Socialist Federal Republic of Yugoslavia)	Rajko Janjanin	CM
(Greece)	Pavlos Papaioannou	RM
(Greece)	Lampros Georgiadis	LM
(Australia)	Jim Patikas	SS
(Sweden)	Håkan Sandberg	CF

Last updated: 1987-06-07
