= Makis Chatzis =

Greek footballer (born 1957)

Personal information
- Full name: Symeon Chatzis
- Date of birth: 30 March 1957 (age 69)
- Place of birth: Athens, Greece
- Height: 1.72 m (5 ft 8 in)
- Position: Full-back

Senior career*
Years	Team	Apps	(Gls)
–1979	APON Smyrnis		
1979–1984	Apollon Athens	36	(0)
1984–1992	AEK Athens	126	(0)
Total		162	(0)
- * Club domestic league appearances and goals

Makis Chatzis (Greek: Μάκης Χατζής; born 30 March 1957) is a Greek former professional footballer who played as full-back.

== Club career ==
Chatzis began his football career at APON Smyrnis, where he played until 1979, when he moved to Apollon Athens and compteted in the first division. On 26 June 1984 he was transferred to AEK Athens for a fee of 6.75 million drachmas.

He immediately became a key player of the club, playing mainly on the right side of the defense, but he was also used as a left-back. He was competed in the club's major European games with opponents such as Real Madrid, Internazionale, Athletic Bilbao, and Marseille. In 1987, with the arrival of Christos Vasilopoulos in the club, Chatzis began losing his place in the starting line-up. However, he was used quite often at both sides of the defense, while in 1989 he won the championship with the "yellow-blacks". After the promotion of Georgios Koutoulas and the signing of Vaios Karagiannis, his appearances were cut even shorter. In his 8-year spell at AEK he did not manage to score a single goal in any official match. With AEK he won 2 Championships, 1 Super Cup and 1 League Cup. In the summer of 1992 he decided to retire from football at the age of 35.

== After football ==
Chatzis has from time to time a strong participation in the association of veteran footballers of AEK.

== Honours ==
AEK Athens

- Alpha Ethniki: 1988–89, 1991–92
- Greek Super Cup: 1989
- Greek League Cup: 1990
