= Greek League Cup =

Defunct men's association football cup in Greece

Κύπελλο ΕΠΑΕ EPAE Cup
- Organiser(s): EPAE
- Founded: 1989; 37 years ago
- Abolished: 1990; 36 years ago
- Region: Greece
- Teams: 18
- Related competitions: Alpha Ethniki
- Last champions: AEK Athens (1st title)
- Most championships: AEK Athens (1 title)

Greek League Cup (Greek: Λίγκ Καπ Ελλάδος), officially known as the EPAE Cup (Greek: Κύπελλο ΕΠΑΕ) was a Greek association football competition, which took place only once, in the 1989–90 season. On 2 June 1990 AEK Athens became the only winner of the competition after beating Olympiacos 3–2 in the final at the Athens Olympic Stadium.

== Tournament ==
In the 1989–90 Greek League Cup, the participants were the 18 clubs of the 1989–90 Alpha Ethniki. All rounds apart from the semi-finals, were played by a single match. If the score was level at the end of normal time, extra time was played, followed by a penalty shoot-out if the score was still level. The semi-finals were played over two legs, with each team playing one leg at home. The team that scored more goals on aggregate over the two legs advanced to the next round. If the aggregate score was level, the away goals rule was applied, i.e. the team that scored more goals away from home over the two legs advanced. If away goals were also equal, then extra time was played. The away goals rule was again applied after extra time, i.e. if there were goals scored during extra time and the aggregate score was still level, the visiting team advanced by virtue of more away goals scored. If no goals were scored during extra time, the winners were decided by a penalty shoot-out. The tournament began on 31 January and ended on 2 June 1990.

=== Calendar ===
Round	Date(s)	Fixtures	Clubs	New entries
First round	31 January 1990	9	18 → 9	none
Additional round	28 March 1990	1	9 → 8	none
Quarter-finals	18 April 1990	8	8 → 4	none
Semi-finals	9, 23 May 1990	4	4 → 2	none
Final	2 June 1990	1	2 → 1	none

=== First round ===
==== Summary ====
Team 1	Score	Team 2
Olympiacos	3–0	Ionikos
Ethnikos Piraeus	2–2 (6–7 p)	Levadiakos
Apollon Athens	1–1 (4–2 p)	Doxa Dramas
Olympiacos Volos	2–0	Panserraikos
OFI	3–0	Apollon Kalamarias
Aris	2–0	AEL
Iraklis	2–1	Xanthi
PAOK	0–2	Panathinaikos
Panionios	3–3 (1–3 p)	AEK Athens

==== Matches ====
31 January 1990
18:30 EET

Olympiacos	3–0	Ionikos
Tsalouchidis 55'; Pachatouridis 80'; Edvaldo 82'	Report

Karaiskakis Stadium, Piraeus
Attendance: 4,124
Referee: Vassilios Nikakis (Aetoloacarnania)

31 January 1990
14:15 EET

Ethnikos Piraeus	2–2 (a.e.t.)	Levadiakos
Mobati 16', 110' (pen.)		Lemonis 79'; Bibisidis 104'
Penalties
Mobati (penalty missed); Tsialafoutas (penalty scored); Chortsas (penalty missed); Pourpoutidis (penalty scored); Mostahinić (penalty scored); Georgaras (penalty scored); Chalkidis (penalty scored); Kamitsis (penalty scored); Kardaris (penalty missed)	6–7	(penalty missed) Ziogas; (penalty missed) Tsanas; (penalty scored) Theocharis; (penalty scored) Kasapis; (penalty scored) Lemonis; (penalty scored) Barrios; (penalty scored) Bibisidis; (penalty scored) Tselebis; (penalty scored) Goulis

Karaiskakis Stadium, Piraeus
Attendance: 299
Referee: Kostas Adamopoulos (Athens)

31 January 1990
14:15 EET

Apollon Athens	1–1 (a.e.t.)	Doxa Dramas
Karasavvidis 68'		Papatheodorou 90'
Penalties
Karasavvidis (penalty scored); Vlachos (penalty scored); Athanasiadis (penalty scored); Jevtović (penalty scored)	4–2	(penalty scored) Charalampidis; (penalty missed) Dafkos; (penalty scored) Kapageridis; (penalty missed) Ouzounidis

Rizoupoli Stadium, Rizoupoli
Attendance: 197
Referee: Nikos Andreou (Athens)

31 January 1990
14:15 EET

Olympiacos Volos	2–0	Panserraikos
Tsapatoris 56'; Pavlović 76'

Volos Municipal Stadium, Volos
Attendance: 999
Referee: Ilias Karamanis (Boeotia)

31 January 1990
14:15 EET

OFI	3–0	Apollon Kalamarias
Patemtzis 3', 10'; Vlastos 51'	Report

Theodoros Vardinogiannis Stadium, Heraklion
Attendance: 1,907
Referee: Giorgos Plevritis (Thessaloniki)

31 January 1990
14:15 EET

Aris	2–0	AEL
Dimitriadis 15', 73'	Report

Aris Stadium, Thessaloniki
Attendance: 1,353
Referee: Vasilis Kougios (Dodecanese)

31 January 1990
14:15 EET

Iraklis	2–1	Xanthi
Toutziaris 56'; G. Papadopoulos 76'		Moustakas 29'

Kaftanzoglio Stadium, Thessaloniki
Referee: Sotiris Vorgias (Athens)

31 January 1990
14:15 EET

PAOK	0–2	Panathinaikos
		Polak 26'; Saravakos 78'

Toumba Stadium, Thessaloniki
Attendance: Behind closed doors
Referee: Christos Kolokythas (Athens)

31 January 1990
14:30 EET

Panionios	3–3 (a.e.t.)	AEK Athens
Karavidas 49'; Mavros 58'; Aposporis 99'	Report	Christodoulou 6'; Famelis 86'; Karagiozopoulos 116' (pen.)
Penalties
Vasilakos (penalty missed); Argyriou (penalty missed); Chatzimoisiadis (penalty scored); Bershemi (penalty missed)	1–3	(penalty scored) Karagiozopoulos; (penalty scored) Batista; (penalty missed) Famelis; (penalty scored) Stamatis

Nea Smyrni Stadium, Nea Smyrni
Referee: Giorgos Giannopoulos (Athens)

=== Additional round ===
==== Summary ====
Team 1	Score	Team 2
Aris	3–1 (a.e.t.)	OFI

==== Matches ====
28 March 1990
16:30 EEST

Aris	3–1 (a.e.t.)	OFI
Gioukoudis 25', 103'; Dimitriadis 120+4'		Kouis 19' (o.g.)

Aris Stadium, Thessaloniki
Referee: Kostas Kortsaris (Thessaloniki)

=== Quarter-finals ===
==== Summary ====
Team 1	Score	Team 2
AEK Athens	5–2	Aris
Olympiacos	1–0	Iraklis
Panathinaikos	5–3	Apollon Athens
Levadiakos	2–1	Olympiacos Volos

==== Matches ====
18 April 1990
16:30 EEST

AEK Athens	5–2	Aris
Patikas 17'; Savevski 37'; Savvidis 67'; Batista 75', 88'	Report	Alexandridis 77', 90'

AEK Stadium, Nea Filadelfeia
Attendance: 12,000
Referee: Dimitris Bentas (Trikala)

18 April 1990
19:30 EEST

Olympiacos	1–0	Iraklis
Détári 77' (pen.)	Report

Karaiskakis Stadium, Piraeus
Attendance: 3,375
Referee: Stratos Kannos (Athens)

18 April 1990
18:30 EEST

Panathinaikos	5–3	Apollon Athens
Kolitsidakis 8' (o.g.); Kolev 34' (pen.), 43'; Dimopoulos 40', 58'	Report	Katzenbach 73'; Karasavvidis 78', 88'

Olympic Stadium, Marousi
Referee: Thanasis Syrmakezis (Larissa)

18 April 1990
16:30 EEST

Levadiakos	2–1	Olympiacos Volos
Ziogas 28', 33'		Skoutas 50'

Levadia Municipal Stadium, Levadia
Referee: Nikos Vournelis (Thessaloniki)

=== Semi-finals ===
==== Summary ====
Team 1	Agg.	Team 2	1st leg	2nd leg
Olympiacos	(a) 2–2	Panathinaikos	1–1	2–2
Levadiakos	0–1	AEK Athens	0–0	0–1

==== Matches ====
9 May 1990
18:00 EEST

Olympiacos	1–1	Panathinaikos
Tsalouchidis 60'	Report	Georgakopoulos 64'

Karaiskakis Stadium, Piraeus
Attendance: 8,965
Referee: Kostas Dimitriadis (Piraeus)
23 May 1990
17:30 EEST

Panathinaikos	2–2	Olympiacos
Christodoulou 7'; Saravakos 42' (pen.)	Report	Tsalouchidis 32'; Alexiou 83'

Olympic Stadium, Marousi
Attendance: 9,371
Referee: Periklis Vasilakis (Athens)

Olympiacos won on away goals.

9 May 1990
17:30 EEST

Levadiakos	0–0	AEK Athens
	Report

Levadia Municipal Stadium, Levadia
Attendance: 857
Referee: Naoum Mintiouris (Serres)
23 May 1990
17:30 EEST

AEK Athens	1–0	Levadiakos
Okoński 8'	Report

AEK Stadium, Nea Filadelfeia
Attendance: 4,000
Referee: Stelios Charlavanis (Euboea)

AEK Athens won 1–0 on aggregate.

== Final ==
2 June 1990
20:30 EEST (UTC+3)

ΑΕΚ Athens	3–2	Olympiacos
G. Savvidis 8', 15'; Savevski 53'	Report	Kalogeropoulos 44'; I. Savvidis 76'

Olympic Stadium, Marousi
Attendance: 22,289
Referee: Makis Germanakos (Athens)

AEK Athens	Olympiacos

GK	1	(Greece) Fanis Kofinas	(yellow card) 36'
RB	6	(Greece) Pavlos Papaioannou (c)
CB	4	(Greece) Stelios Manolas
CB	5	(Greece) Takis Karagiozopoulos
LB	2	(Greece) Christos Vasilopoulos
CM	8	(Socialist Federal Republic of Yugoslavia) Toni Savevski
CM	3	(Cyprus) Giorgos Savvidis
CM	7	(Australia) Jim Patikas
LW	11	(Greece) Georgios Christodoulou		(substituted off) 82'
RW	10	(Poland) Miroslav Okonski
CF	9	(Greece) Daniel Batista		(substituted off) 62'
Substitutes
GK	15	(Greece) Antonis Minou
DF	12	(Greece) Giorgos Peppes
MF	13	(Greece) Giorgos Famelis		(substituted on) 82'
MF	14	(Greece) Lampros Georgiadis		(substituted on) 62'
MF	16	(Greece) Panagiotis Pangratis
Manager
(Socialist Federal Republic of Yugoslavia) Dušan Bajević

GK	1	(Greece) Ilias Talikriadis
RB	2	(Greece) Stratos Apostolakis (c)
CB	3	(Greece) Kyriakos Karataidis
CB	5	(Greece) Alexandros Alexiou
LB	4	(Greece) Theodoros Pachatouridis
CM	6	(Greece) Panagiotis Tsalouchidis
CM	10	(Greece) Sotiris Mavrommatis
RM	8	(Greece) Savvas Kofidis
LM	7	(Greece) Nikos Tsiantakis
CF	9	(Greece) Vangelis Kalogeropoulos	(substituted off) 64'
CF	11	(Greece) Apostolos Drakopoulos
Substitutes
GK	15	(Greece) Alekos Rantos
DF	12	(Greece) Nikos Nentidis
MF	13	(Greece) Minas Hantzidis
MF	14	(Greece) Ilias Savvidis	(substituted on) 64'
MF	16	(Greece) Matthaios Gotzias
Manager
(Greece) Kostas Polychroniou

== Top scorers ==
Rank	Player	Club(s)	Goals
1	(Greece) Vasilis Dimitriadis	Aris	3
1	(Greece) Aris Karasavvidis	Apollon Athens	3
1	(Greece) Panagiotis Tsalouchidis	Olympiacos	3
1	(Cyprus) Giorgos Savvidis	AEK Athens	3
5	(Greece) Manolis Patemtzis	OFI	2
5	(Zaire) Gaston Mobati	Ethnikos Piraeus	2
5	(Greece) Antonis Gioukoudis	Aris	2
5	(Greece) Michalis Ziogas	Levadiakos	2
5	(Bulgaria) Hristo Kolev	Panathinaikos	2
5	(Greece) Christos Dimopoulos	Panathinaikos	2
5	(Greece) Daniel Batista	AEK Athens	2
5	(Greece) Kyriakos Alexandridis	Aris	2
5	(Greece) Dimitris Saravakos	Panathinaikos	2
5	(Socialist Federal Republic of Yugoslavia) Toni Savevski	AEK Athens	2

== See also ==
- Super League Greece
- Greek Football Cup
- Greek Super Cup
