= Manikas =

Manikas (Greek: Μανίκας) is a surname. Notable people with the surname include:

- Antonis Manikas (born 1959), Greek football player and manager
- Ilias Manikas (born 1980), Greek footballer
- Stefanos Manikas (1952–2015), Greek politician
