= Fanis Kofinas =

Greek footballer (born in 1960)

Personal information
- Full name: Theofanis Kofinas
- Date of birth: 5 September 1960 (age 66)
- Place of birth: Lykoporia, Corinth Greece
- Height: 1.81 m (5 ft 11 in)
- Position: Goalkeeper

Youth career
- –1980: AO Lykoporia

Senior career*
Years	Team	Apps	(Gls)
1980–1982	Pelopas Kiato		
1982–1992	AEK Athens	13	(0)
1983–1985	→ Korinthos (loan)		
1985–1987	→ Ionikos (loan)		
1992–1994	Egaleo		
1994–1995	Acharnaikos		

International career
- Greece U21
- * Club domestic league appearances and goals

Fanis Kofinas (Greek: Φάνης Κοφινάς; born 5 September 1960) is a Greek former professional footballer who played as goalkeeper.

== Club career ==
Kofinas started football from the amateur club of his village, AO Lykoporia. In 1980 he was transferred to Pelopas Kiato. At Pelopas, he competed in the second division and the third division of Greece.

On 26 July 1982, Kofinas was transferred to AEK Athens for a fee of 1.5 million drachmas. He spent most of his time at the club as a substitute. On 28 July 1983 he was loaned to the second division side, Korinthos for two seasons. After his loan was expired, on 15 July 1985 he was loaned again for two seasons to Ionikos, who also played in the second division.

He returned to AEK in 1987 and during the season he did most of his appearances for the yellow-blacks since the main goalkeeper, Theologis Papadopoulos was sidelined due to his involvement in a match fixing scandal. However, a goal he conceded in a derby against Panathinaikos from Chatziathanasiou in 1988, affected the rest of his career, since it was a rather weak long shot that passed through his hands and eventually cost AEK the draw. In the following summer the arrival of Antonis Minou made things difficult for Kofinas, as he was a third choice goalkeeper behind Ikonomopoulos and Minou. In 1990 he spent his best days in AEK after having a good performance in the Greek League Cup, where Dušan Bajević used him as a starter and they eventually won the tournament, with Kofinas saving a penalty twice in the final against Olympiacos. Despite these performances, he did not manage to establish himself in the main squad making a total of only 13 league appearances. During his spell at AEK, he won two Championships, a Cup, a Super Cup and the League Cup.

In 1992 Kofinas was released from AEK and on 14 July he signed for Egaleo, where he spent two seasons. Afterwards he moved to Acharnaikos, where he played for a season before ending his professional career.

== After football ==
After the end of his career, Kofinas worked as a maths teacher.

== Honours ==
AEK Athens

- Alpha Ethniki: 1988–89, 1991–92
- Greek Cup: 1982–83
- Greek Super Cup: 1989
- Greek League Cup: 1990
