= Georgi Tsingov =

Bulgarian footballer (born 1956)

Georgi Tsingov (Bulgarian: Георги Цингов; born 21 February 1956) is a Bulgarian former professional footballer who played as a striker.

== Early life ==
Tsingov was born in 1956 in Lyubimets, Bulgaria.

== Career ==
During his playing career, Tsingov was nicknamed "Tsingata" in Bulgaria. In 1987, he signed for Greek side AEL. He helped them win their first league title. In 1988, he signed for Cypriot side Omonia, helping them win the league.

== Style of play ==
Tsingov mainly operated as a striker and was known for his shooting ability with his left foot.

== Personal life ==
During his playing career, besides playing football, Tsingov was known for hunting.
