= Gaston Mobati =

Congolese footballer

Personal information
- Full name: Gaston Mobati-Wa
- Date of birth: 4 September 1961
- Place of birth: Léopoldville, Congo-Léopoldville
- Date of death: 15 May 1995 (aged 33)
- Place of death: Saint-Denis, Réunion
- Height: 1.80 m (5 ft 11 in)
- Position: Striker

Senior career*
Years	Team	Apps	(Gls)
1983–1985	AS Bilima		
1985–1986	FC Montceau	7	(1)
1986–1989	Lille	74	(19)
1989–1990	Ethnikos Piraeus	14	(2)
1990	Guingamp	11	(2)
1991	AS Beauvais	2	(0)

International career
1988	Zaire	1	(0)
- * Club domestic league appearances and goals

Gaston Mobati (4 September 1961 – 15 May 1995), was a Congolese professional footballer who played as a striker.

== Career ==
Mobati was born in Kinshasa. He had a spell with Ethnikos Piraeus in the Super League Greece during the 1989–90 season.
