= Giorgos Peppes =

Greek footballer (born 1961)

Personal information
- Full name: Georgios Peppes
- Date of birth: 26 October 1961 (age 65)
- Place of birth: Eretria, Greece
- Position: Center back

Youth career
- –1979: Apollon Eretria

Senior career*
Years	Team	Apps	(Gls)
1979–1986	Ethnikos Piraeus	100	(7)
1981–1982	→ Rodos (loan)		
1986–1991	AEK Athens	97	(3)
1991–1993	Ethnikos Piraeus	7	(0)

International career
1986	Greece	1	(0)
- * Club domestic league appearances and goals

Giorgos Peppes (Greek: Γιώργος Πεππές; born 26 October 1961) is a Greek former professional footballer who played as center back.

== Club career ==
Peppes started his football career his local Apollon Eretria. On 30 July 1979, he was transferred to Ethnikos Piraeus. In the summer of 1981 he was loaned to Rodos for a season. Afterwards he returned to the club of Piraeus, where he earned a spot in the team's starting eleventh.

On 1 December 1986 Peppes was transferred to AEK Athens for a fee of 10 million drachmas.. On 24 April 1988 he opened the score in a 2–2 draw against Panathinaikos. He also scored the equalizer with a header in the 1–2 home defeat against Olympiacos on 7 January 1989. At his 6-year spell at AEK, he won the 2 Championships, 1 Super Cup and 1 League Cup.

In 16 December 1991 after his contract with AEK was expired, Peppes returned to Ethnikos Piraeus, where he played for one and a half season, before ending his career.

== International career ==
Peppes played for Greece once in a friendly 0–0 draw against Cyprus, on 19 February 1986.

== After football ==
After the end of his career, he created football academies in Marousi, while at the same time obtaining a coaching diploma and was involved in coaching at an amateur level. He also participates from time to time in events of AEK veterans.

== Honours ==
AEK Athens

- Alpha Ethniki: 1988–89, 1991–92
- Greek Super Cup: 1989
- Greek League Cup: 1990
