= Sotiris Mavrodimos =

Greek footballer (born 1962)

Personal information
- Full name: Sotirios Mavrodimos
- Date of birth: 18 July 1962 (age 64)
- Place of birth: Aiani, Kozani, Greece
- Height: 1.86 m (6 ft 1 in)
- Positions: Defender; defensive midfielder

Youth career
- Aiani

Senior career*
Years	Team	Apps	(Gls)
–1986	Kozani		
1986–1988	AEK Athens	40	(1)
1988–1990	Olympiacos Volos	43	(3)
1990	Niki Volos		
Total		83	(4)

Managerial career
- 2004: Kozani
- 2013: Pyrsos Grevena
- * Club domestic league appearances and goals

Sotiris Mavrodimos (Greek: Σωτήρης Μαυροδήμος; born 18 July 1962) is a Greek former professional footballer who played as a defender and a former manager.

== Club career ==
Mavrodimos began his football career at his local club, Aiani, where he signed for Kozani. On 14 July 1986 he was transferred to AEK Athens for a fee of 5.5 million drachmas.

At AEK he was used in all the positions of the defense as well as a defensive midfielder. On 1 March 1987 in a match against Apollon Athens after an unsportsmanlike tackle by Alexis Fabiatos, Mavrodimos lost consciousness for a few minutes. According to the doctors of the match, his vital signs did not work for a few seconds, shocking football fans all over Greece. The efforts of the team's physiotherapist, Nikos Pantazis and his teammate, Stelios Manolas played a decisive role in keeping him alive at that moment. Eventually, he was later transferred to the KAT Hospital and fully recovered, avoiding the fatal accident. Mavrodimos did not accept Fabiatos, who came to visit him at the hospital and apologize to him, since he considered that his tackle was intentional. On 10 February 1988 he scored against Olympiacos equalizing the game in a 1–3 home defeat for the Greek Cup. Mavrodimos played in big European matches of AEK, such as those against Internazionale and Athletic Bilbao

Οn 15 December 1988 he was transferred to Olympiacos Volos for a fee of 5 million drachmas. In 1990 Mavrodimos moved to the local rivals, Niki Volos, where he ended his career.

== After football ==
After the end of his career Mavrodimos was involved in coaching having short spells at Kozani and Pyrsos Grevena.
