= Dinos Ballis =

Greek footballer (born 1957)

Personal information
- Full name: Konstantinos Ballis
- Date of birth: 25 May 1957 (age 69)
- Place of birth: Thessaloniki, Greece
- Height: 1.88 m (6 ft 2 in)
- Position: Midfielder

Youth career
- 1967–1974: Aris

Senior career*
Years	Team	Apps	(Gls)
1974–1981	Aris	226	(43)
1981–1986	AEK Athens	159	(13)
1986–1988	Aris	27	(0)
Total		412	(56)

International career
1978–1981	Greece	6	(0)
- * Club domestic league appearances and goals

Dinos Ballis (Greek: Ντίνος Μπαλλής; born 25 May 1957) is a Greek former professional footballer who played as a midfielder.

== Club career ==
Ballis started his football career at a very young age, as in 1967 he took out a sport's card for Aris. He passed from all the divisions of the infrastructure departments of the club, when in 1974, at the age of 17 he was promoted to the men's team, which was a result of his great and rapid development. He started playing as a striker, then as a central defender, but established himself as an attacking midfielder, where he distinguished himself for his high technique and great creative abilities as well as for the dynamism of his game. On June 3 of 1979, Aris beat Kastoria by 7–2, with Ballis scoring a hat-trick within 8 minutes. In the season 1979–80, he played in all six UEFA Cup matches, where his team reached the Round of 16, eliminating Benfica and Perugia, only to be eliminated from Saint-Étienne He also played in the games against Ipswich the following season, where Aris were beaten 5–1 at Portman Road and won by 3–1 at Kaftanzoglio Stadium. He played seven seasons in the club of Thessaloniki, being one of their best players, while also becoming an international footballer. In the spring of 1981, there was a rift between Ballis and the management of Aris, due to a publication in which the former allegedly criticized the management of the club. The footballer was called to an apology and then punished by exclusion from the team's playing obligations.

On 18 July 1981, Ballis was transferred to AEK Athens for 17 million drachmas. He became a key player in the squad for the following 5 seasons. On 29 June 1983 he participated in his team's 2–0 victory against PAOK for the Cup Final. Ballis played in both matches against Újpest for the UEFA Cup Winners' Cup, in AEK's 5–0 defeat from Real Madrid at Santiago Bernabéu Stadium for the UEFA Cup, as well as in the matches against Internazionale again for the UEFA Cup.

He was released from AEK and on 15 December 1986 he returned to Aris, where he finished his football career in 1988.

== International career ==
Ballis played for Greece in 6 matches, making his debut on 11 January 1978, in a friendly away win against Cyprus. He played against on 21 March 1979, in another friendly against Romania and in 1980 for two more friendlies against Cyprus and Australia. He played for the last time with the national team on April 29, 1981, in Greece's away defeat by Yugoslavia for the 1982 FIFA World Cup qualifiers.

== After football ==
On 9 February 1988, at the eve of the rematch of AEK–Olympiacos for the cup, Ballis visited at the hotel where the AEK squad were located with a bouquet for the goalkeeper, Theologis Papadopoulos and created strong suspicions that he was trying to bribe him on behalf of Olympiacos to have reduced performance. The match took place, with Olympiacos winning 1–3 and the story continued in the courts. The Koskotas brothers were accused of trying to bribe Papadopoulos and Vasilakos through Ballis, while many AEK fans believe that AEK was involved in the whole case. Eventually, in a very strange court decision, the only one who was punished for the whole case was Ballis for attempted bribery.

== Honours ==
AEK Athens

- Greek Cup: 1982–83
