= Pavlos Dimitriou =

Greek footballer

Personal information
- Date of birth: 24 March 1957 (age 69)
- Place of birth: Serres, Greece
- Height: 1.83 m (6 ft 0 in)
- Position: Midfielder

Team information
- Current team: Panserraikos U19

Youth career
- 1969–1974: Panserraikos

Senior career*
Years	Team	Apps	(Gls)
1974–1985	Panserraikos		
1985–1987	AEK Athens	20	(1)
1987–1989	Panserraikos	14	(1)
1989–1990	Nigrita		

Managerial career
- 1997: Panserraikos
- 1999: Panserraikos (caretaker)
- 2000: Panserraikos
- 2000–2001: Panserraikos
- 2004: Panserraikos
- 2011: Panserraikos
- 2011–2012: Panserraikos
- 2015–2016: Panserraikos
- 2016–2020: Apollon Paralimnio
- 2020–: Panserraikos U19
- * Club domestic league appearances and goals

Pavlos Dimitriou (Greek: Παύλος Δημητρίου; born 24 March 1957) is a Greek football manager and former player who played as a midfielder.

== Playing career ==
Dimitriou started at the age of 12 as a left back from the academies of Panserraikos and in 1975 he was promoted to the first team. A year later he became already the captain of the team, while his virtues with the ball at his feet "forced" the managers of the club to place him as a midfielder. Dimitriou presented a stable performance, serving the "Lions" for 16 consecutive seasons.

On 16 December 1985 he made the big step of his career and was transferred to AEK Athens for a fee of 11 million drachmas. Dimitriou, away from his environment, found it difficult to adapt, while AEK were also in a strange situation, a fact that was exacerbated by the Chrysovitsianos case against his former club.

On 15 July 1987 he was transferred back to Panserraikos for a fee of 3 million drachmas. Two years later and due to an injury that left him out of action for 4 months, he moved to Nigrita where he ended his career in 1990.

== Managerial career ==
Almost immediately after retiring as a footballer, Dimitriou became a coach with important terms in Panserraikos both in the infrastructure departments and in the first team.
