= Panagiotis Stylianopoulos =

Greek footballer

Personal information
- Full name: Panagiotis Stylianopoulos
- Date of birth: 4 September 1957 (age 69)
- Place of birth: Nikaia, Greece
- Height: 1.75 m (5 ft 9 in)
- Position: Full-back

Youth career
- –1979: AEK Athens

Senior career*
Years	Team	Apps	(Gls)
1977–1987	AEK Athens	120	(1)
1980–1981	→ Atromitos (loan)		
1987–1988	Ionikos		
1988–1989	Korinthos		
- Thrasyvoulos
- Mandraikos

International career
1978–1979	Greece amateur		

Managerial career
- 1995–1996: Aspropyrgos
- 1995–1996: Mandraikos
- * Club domestic league appearances and goals

Panagiotis Stylianopoulos (Greek: Παναγιώτης Στυλιανόπουλος; born 4 September 1957) is a Greek former professional footballer who played as full-back and a former manager. His nickname was "Stielike" derived from the name of Uli Stielike.

== Club career ==
Stylianopoulos started football at the academies of AEK Athens, where he made his first appearance for the men's team on 26 December 1977, still playing for the youth team, due to a strike of the footballers. The following season he was promoted to the men's team and on 30 July 1980 he was loaned to Atromitos. In the following season he returned to the team where he found a place in their roster. He mainly played as a full-back and despite being a dynamic and combative footballer, he had several competitive shortcomings. In his 10-year spell with the yellow-blacks, he scored a single goal for the league, as he opened the score on 21 February 1987 against Ethnikos Piraeus in a 2–1 home win. At AEK he won the championship in 1979 as well as the Cup in 1983. On 17 December 1987, he left AEK and joined Ionikos.There he played until 1988, when he continued playing in lower division clubs, such as Korinthos, Thrasyvoulos and Mandraikos.

== After football ==
After the end of his career, Stylianopoulos became a manager, worked for a long time in the academies of AEK Athens and worked for many years at Mandraikos. Ηe is also a very active member of the club of veteran football players of AEK.

== Honours ==
AEK Athens

- Alpha Ethniki: 1977–78, 1978–79
- Greek Cup: 1982–83
