= Rajko Janjanin =

Personal information
- Full name: Rajko Janjanin
- Date of birth: 18 January 1957 (age 69)
- Place of birth: Karlovac, PR Croatia, FPR Yugoslavia
- Position: Midfielder

Youth career
- 1969–1975: NK Karlovac

Senior career*
| Years | Team | Apps | (Gls) |
| 1975–1980 | Dinamo Zagreb | 108 | (4) |
| 1980–1984 | Red Star Belgrade | 115 | (22) |
| 1985–1986 | OFI | 43 | (11) |
| 1986–1988 | AEK Athens | 51 | (5) |
| Total | | 317 | (42) |

International career
| 1979–1980 | Yugoslavia | 2 | (0) |

Managerial career
- 1993–1994: Erani Filiatra
- 1995–1996: A.O. Agios Nikolaos
- 1996–2002: P.O. Atsaleniou
- 2001–2002: Panathinaikos U20
- 2002–2003: Almyros Gaziou
- 2015: Episkopi
- 2015–2016: P.A.O. Krousonas
Medal record
Men's Football
Representing Yugoslavia
Mediterranean Games
| Gold medal – first place | 1979 Split | Team |
- * Club domestic league appearances and goals

Rajko Janjanin (Serbian Cyrillic: Pajкo Jaњaнин; born 18 January 1957) is a Yugoslav of Croatian Serb descent former international football player, who played as a midfielder and a manager.

== Club career ==
Janjanin started his professional career in 1975 playing for Dinamo Zagreb, with whom he played for five years, winning the Yugoslav Cup in 1980.

Afterwards, he joined Red Star Belgrade for almost five years. His shining moment took place on 19 September 1984, when he scored a second half hat-trick in the 3–2 win over Benfica for the European Cup after Red Star was down by 0–2. With Red Star he won two Yugoslav First League and a Yugoslav cup in 1982, while he became an international footballer.

In November 1984, Janjanin moved to Greece and joined OFI, where he performed very well and had a decisive contribution to the Cretan team, achieving a second place finish in the following season's championship. In December 1986 his contract was coming to an end and despite the proposal of the management for a renewal, there was a gap between the two sides, since the player was asking for 18 million drachmas for a two-year contract and he was offered much less money. AEK Athens, which were interested in the player, fully met his demands and signed him, despite the opposition from OFI. At AEK he didn't achieve high performances, but occasionally showed samples of his football quality. On 6 July 1988, his contract was terminated and unable to find a club of his interest, Janjanin decided to retire as a footballer.

== International career ==
Janjanin was capped twice for Yugoslavia.

== Managerial career ==
As a coach, Janjanin spent a long time at the P.O. Atsaleniou and then spent many years at the academy of Panathinaikos. In 2006 and in 2012 he served as an assistant of Alberto Malesani and Giannis Vonortas respectively in the men's team. In 2015 he was an assistant of Jasminko Velić at the bench of Episkopi, while he later stayed for a short time as the head coach of the Rethymno team. Then he signed at P.A.O. Krousonas for the 2015–16 season.

== Personal life ==
His brother, Željko was also a footballer.

== Honours ==
Dinamo Zagreb

- Yugoslav Cup: 1980

Red Star

- Yugoslav Championship: 1981, 1984
- Yugoslav Cup: 1982, 1985
