= Ilias Armodoros =

Greek footballer and manager (born 1960)

Personal information
- Date of birth: 25 January 1960 (age 66)
- Place of birth: Piraeus, Greece
- Height: 1.75 m (5 ft 9 in)
- Position: Left back

Youth career
- 1974–1977: Agios Dimitrios

Senior career*
Years	Team	Apps	(Gls)
1977–1985	Ethnikos Piraeus	169	(7)
1985–1987	AEK Athens	42	(0)
1987–1991	Levadiakos	93	(0)
Total		304	(7)

Managerial career
- 1997: Lamia
- 1998–2000: Marko
- 2000–2001: Atromitos
- 2001: Panelefsiniakos
- 2002: Marko
- 2002: Panachaiki
- 2003: Levadiakos
- 2004–2005: Ethnikos Asteras
- * Club domestic league appearances and goals

Ilias Armodoros (Greek: Ηλίας Αρμόδωρος; born on 25 January 1960) is a Greek former professional footballer who played as a left back and manager.

== Club career ==
Armodoros started football at the age of 14 from the amateur club of Agios Dimitrios in Piraeus. In the summer of 1977 he was transferred to Ethnikos Piraeus. He made his debut as an amateur player on 26 December 1977, when there was a strike by professional footballers and from the following year he was permanently in the team as a regular. He remained in the club for eight years. On 5 July 1985 he signed for AEK Athens. He played at the club for two seasons, emerging as their main left back. On 8 July 1987 he was released from AEK and signed for the newly promoted Levadiakos, where he played for four seasons and ended his career in 1991. Armodoros played in total 304 games in the league. He was also an international with all Greece's youth departments.

== Managerial career ==
After the end of his playing career Armodoros worked as a manager for clubs in the top three divisions of Greece.

== After football ==
On 3 January 2020, the Board of Directors of the National OFPF unanimously decided to entrust the responsibility of the men's football department to Armodoros and the partners of his choice.

== Personal life ==
Armodoros comes from a sports family in Piraeus, since his father, Giorgos was a football referee in the first division and his grandmother's brother, Mimis Pasalaris was one of the founders of Ethnikos Piraeus in 1923. In recent years he has been involved in the trade of sporting goods.
