= Polyvios Chatzopoulos =

Greek footballer (born 1961)

Paul Chatzopoulos
Personal information
- Full name: Polyvios Chatzopoulos
- Date of birth: 17 July 1961 (age 65)
- Place of birth: Tripoli, Greece
- Height: 1.80 m (5 ft 11 in)
- Positions: Center back; defensive midfielder

Youth career
- 1976–1980: Panarkadikos

Senior career*
Years	Team	Apps	(Gls)
1980–1985	Panionios	132	(7)
1985–1988	AEK Athens	59	(2)
1988–1989	Diagoras	15	(1)
1989–1991	Xanthi	11	(1)
1991–1994	Panarkadikos		
1994–1995	Sparta		

International career
- Greece U21
1983	Greece Mediterranean	3	(1)
1984	Greece	2	(0)
- * Club domestic league appearances and goals

Polyvios "Paul" Chatzopoulos (Greek: Πολύβιος "Πολ" Χατζόπουλος; born 17 July 1961) is a Greek former professional footballer who played as a center back.

== Club career ==
Chatzopoulos started football at the age of 15 playing for Panarkadikos. In 1980 he was transferred to Panionios, where he played for 5 years having a good presence. He initially started his career as a striker, but later established himself mainly as a center back, occasionally playing as a defensive midfielder.

On 21 June 1985 Chatzopoulos was transferred to AEK Athens for a fee of 10.4 million drachmas. He played as a sweeper, with Stelios Manolas as a stopper and distinguished himself mainly for his composure in his game and his quite good technique for a defensive footballer. In December 1988, he was not part of the plans of the new manager, Dušan Bajević and made 3 league appearances in the first half of that season.

On 5 December Chatzopoulos was transferred to Diagoras for a fee of 4 million drachmas. He played until the end of the season and then he moved to Xanthi, where he played for tow seasons. He continued in smaller divisions, returning to Panarkadikos for two years. Chatzopoulos ended his career in 1995 playing for Sparta.

== International career ==
Chatzopoulos was a played Greece U21 of the early 80s. In 1983 he competed with the national team in the Mediterranean Games. He participated in three matches and scored in the victory against Libya, in the 81st minute. Also, in 1983 he competed in the Olympic team.

He played Greece. His first participation was on 11 April 1984 in a home friendly 1–1 draw against Cyprus. His second and final appearance was on 17 October 1984 in a world cup away match against Poland.

== After football ==
After the end of his career, Chatzopoulos worked as a scout for Asteras Tripolis, while today he is the regional coach-coordinator of Peloponnese at the HFF for the national team in the U15.
