= Stelios Aposporis =

Greek footballer and manager

Personal information
- Full name: Stylianos Aposporis
- Date of birth: 15 November 1964 (age 61)
- Place of birth: Athens, Greece
- Position: Midfielder

Senior career*
Years	Team	Apps	(Gls)
1982–1990	Panionios	192	(13)
1990–1993	OFI	58	(3)
1993–1996	Doxa Vyronas	?	(?)

Managerial career
- 2004–2007: Greece U21
- * Club domestic league appearances and goals

Stelios Aposporis (Greek: Στέλιος Αποσπόρης; born 15 November 1964) is a former Greek footballer who played as a midfielder. He played during the 80's in many famous Greek teams such as Panionios (1982–1990), OFI (1990–1993) and Doxa Virona (1993–1996) and in 1996 decided to retire from professional football. In 2004, he was appointed from Hellenic Football Federation as Greece Under 21 manager. He was replaced in September 2007 by Nikos Nioplias.
