= Georgios Koutoulas =

Greek footballer and a coach

Giorgos Koutoulas
Personal information
- Full name: Georgios Koutoulas
- Date of birth: 9 February 1967 (age 59)
- Place of birth: Skala, Greece
- Positions: Defender; defensive midfielder

Team information
- Current team: Molaikos (manager)

Youth career
- 1976–1985: Aris Skala
- 1985–1987: AEK Athens

Senior career*
Years	Team	Apps	(Gls)
1987–1998	AEK Athens	138	(5)
1998–1999	PAS Giannina	29	(1)
1999–2000	Panetolikos	30	(2)
Total		197	(8)

International career
1988	Greece U21	4	(0)
1988–1990	Greece	11	(0)

Managerial career
- 2017–2018: Karyatides
- 2018–: Molaikos
- * Club domestic league appearances and goals

Georgios Koutoulas (Greek: Γεώργιος Κούτουλας; born 9 February 1967) is a Greek former professional footballer who played as a defender, mostly for AEK Athens and a manager. He is currently the manager of Molaikos.

== Club career ==
Koutoulas started football from his local club, Aris Skala and in the summer of 1985 he moved to the reserve team of AEK Athens. In 1987 he was promoted to the first team under Todor Veselinović. He played in mainly as center back and left back, while sometimes also played as a defensive midfielder.

He had a very good first season and was considered a big talent of the time after his first appearances. The next season under Dušan Bajević, he also did very well and helped AEK with his performances to win the league in 1989. In fact, he was the third AEK player in appearances during that season. Afterwards, he showed himself to be relatively stagnant, while also facing injuries and his participation was clearly smaller. During his last three seasons in the team he was purely a substitute footballer and he rarely played. At AEK he won in total 4 championships, 2 cups, 2 Super Cups and a League Cup in 1990.

On 8 August 1998 he was released from AEK and signed for PAS Giannina, where he played for one season. Afterwards he played another season for Panetolikos, before ending his career in 2000.

== International career ==
Ιn 1988 Koutoulas played with Greece U21 in the European Championship where he reached the final against France, doing exceptionally well in both legs against Eric Cantona. However they lost the title after a 3–0 loss at the second leg in Stade Léo Lagrange.

Koutoulas played with Greece making 11 appearances between 1988 and 1990. He made his debut on 2 November 1988, replacing Tasos Mitropoulos at the 46th minute, in a 3–0 away defeat at the hands of Romania for the qualificating round of the 1990 FIFA World Cup

== Managerial career ==
On 6 July 2017 Koutoulas started working as a coach for the women's club, Karyatides. From 28 June 2018, he is in charge of the youth and men's departments of Molaikos.

== Personal life ==
After the end of his football career Koutoulas returned to is homeland, Skala of Laconia to enact with the cultivation of the land for a while before he got involved with coaching. He is also heavily involved in matches of the Veterans Association of AEK Athens. He was one of the 23 veteran football players of AEK who were honored at the opening of the Agia Sophia Stadium.

== Honours ==
AEK Athens

- Alpha Ethniki: 1988–89, 1991–92, 1992–93, 1993–94
- Greek Cup: 1995–96, 1996–97
- Greek Super Cup: 1989, 1996
- Greek League Cup: 1990
