= Ilias Savvidis =

Greek footballer

Personal information
- Date of birth: 3 November 1967 (age 58)
- Place of birth: Chimarros, Serres, Greece
- Position: Midfielder

Youth career
- 1983–1986: Panserraikos

Senior career*
Years	Team	Apps	(Gls)
1986–1988	Panserraikos	29	(7)
1988–1994	Olympiacos	99	(12)
1994	Aris	6	(1)
1995–1996	Ionikos	43	(8)
1996–1997	Panachaiki	25	(5)
Total		202	(33)

International career
1989	Greece	6	(0)
- * Club domestic league appearances and goals

Ilias Savvidis (Greek: Ηλίας Σαββίδης; born 3 January 1967) is a retired Greek football midfielder.
