= Kostas Batsinilas =

Greek footballer (born 1963)

Personal information
- Full name: Konstantinos Batsinilas
- Date of birth: 12 February 1963 (age 63)
- Place of birth: Piraeus, Greece
- Height: 1.85 m (6 ft 1 in)
- Position: Midfielder

Youth career
- 1980–1981: Ethnikos Piraeus

Senior career*
Years	Team	Apps	(Gls)
1981–1985	Ethnikos Piraeus	97	(32)
1986–1989	Panathinaikos	39	(15)
1989–1990	OFI	38	(8)
1990–1992	Apollon Athens	33	(6)
1992–1993	Korinthos	2	(0)
Total		209	(61)

International career
1983–1988	Greece	22	(2)
- * Club domestic league appearances and goals

Konstantinos "Kostas" Batsinilas (Greek: Κωνσταντίνος "Κώστας" Μπατσινίλας; born 12 February 1963) is a Greek former footballer who played as a midfielder and made 22 appearances for the Greece national team. (Note: Kostas Batsinilas at WorldFootball.net)

== Career ==
Batsinilas made his international debut for Greece on 14 December 1983 in a UEFA Euro 1984 qualifying match against Luxembourg, which finished as a 1–0 win. He went on to make 22 appearances, scoring 2 goals, before making his last appearance on 21 May 1988 in a 1988 Sir Stanley Matthews Cup match against Canada, which finished as a 3–0 win.

== Career statistics ==
Greece
Year	Apps	Goals
1983	1	0
1984	7	0
1985	4	0
1986	3	1
1987	5	1
1988	2	0
Total	22	2

No.	Date	Venue	Opponent	Score	Result	Competition
1	3 December 1986	Makario Stadium, Nicosia, Cyprus	Cyprus	3–2	4–2	UEFA Euro 1988 qualifying
2	7 January 1987	Estádio Municipal, Portalegre, Portugal	Portugal	1–1	1–1	Friendly
