= Lampros Georgiadis =

Greek footballer

Personal information
- Full name: Charalampos Georgiadis
- Date of birth: 11 June 1963 (age 63)
- Place of birth: Nea Sampsounta, Greece
- Height: 1.80 m (5 ft 11 in)
- Positions: Attacking midfielder; left midfielder; left back

Youth career
- 1976–1980: AE Nea Sampsounta

Senior career*
Years	Team	Apps	(Gls)
1980–1984	PAS Preveza		
1984–1986	Anagennisi Arta		
1986–1993	AEK Athens	102	(8)
1994–1998	Kalamata		

International career
1986–1988	Greece U21		
- * Club domestic league appearances and goals

Lampros Georgiadis (Greek: Λάμπρος Γεωργιάδης; born 11 January 1963) is a Greek former professional footballer who played as midfielder. He is one of the youngest players in the history of Greek football to score a hat-trick.

== Club career ==
Georgiadis initially competed in the village team, AE Nea Sampsounta debuting at the age of 13. In 1980, he was signed by PAS Preveza where he played for 4 years at Gamma Ethniki. In 1984 he was transferred to another Gamma Ethniki side, Anagennisi Arta for 5 million drachmas.

On 14 July 1986 Georgiadis made the big step of his career and was transferred to AEK Athens for a fee of 11 million drachmas, while he was serving in the Army. He played as am attacking midfielder and left midfielder, but many times he also played as a left back. A footballer with a long stride and a strong shot, he was an important player of the team for the seven years he wore its jersey, having appearances sometimes as a starter and sometimes as a substitute. He did not impress with his performances, while also having several injuries, but he was a player who won the trust of his coaches. He had a fairly large participation in the championship of 1989, while on the contrary in his last 2 seasons in the team when they won the respective titles, his participation was very little. In addition to these 3 championships, he won the one Super Cup and one League Cup with AEK.

On 15 July 1993 Georgiadis was released from AEK and signed for Kalamata alongside his teammates Pavlos Papaioannou and Christos Vasilopoulos. He stayed at the club until 1998, when he retired as a footballer.

== International career ==
From 1986 to 1988 Georgiadis was a member of Greece U21, winning 2nd place in the 1988 UEFA European Under-21 Championship, under Andreas Stamatiadis.

== After football ==
After the end of his football career, he did not work professionally in the field of football. However, he has a strong participation in events and matches of the association of veteran football players of AEK Athens. In 2018 he was hired as a coach in the football academies of Kostas Nestoridis, Nestoras FC.

== Honours ==
AEK Athens

- Alpha Ethniki: 1988–89, 1991–92, 1992–93
- Greek Super Cup: 1989
- Greek League Cup: 1990
