= Dimitris Volonakis =

Greek footballer and coach

Personal information
- Full name: Dimitrios Volonakis
- Date of birth: 27 February 1967 (age 59)
- Place of birth: Sydney, Australia
- Height: 1.86 m (6 ft 1 in)
- Position: Defender

Team information
- Current team: Kalymnikos

Youth career
- 1979: Kingsford Megisty
- 1979–1984: Kalymnikos
- 1984–1987: AEK Athens

Senior career*
Years	Team	Apps	(Gls)
1986–1990	AEK Athens	9	(0)
1989–1990	→ Diagoras (loan)		
1990–1994	Egaleo		
1994	Olympiacos Volos		
1994–1995	Egaleo		
1995–1996	Atromitos		
1996–1997	Ialysos		
1997–1998	Egaleo		
1998–1999	Leonidio		
1999–2000	Achaiki		
2000–2001	Akarnanikos Fytion		

International career
1984	Greece U19	11	(0)
1986–1988	Greece U21	12	(0)

Managerial career
- 2001–2002: Akarnanikos Fytion
- 2002–2003: Korfos Elounda
- 2003–2005: Almyros
- 2005–2007: PAO Krousonas
- 2007–2009: Mocho
- 2009–2010: PAO Krousonas
- 2010–2011: Almyros
- 2011–2015: OFI U20
- 2016–2017: PAO Krousonas
- 2017–2018: Ermis Zoniana
- 2018–2019: Almyros
- 2019–2020: PAO Krousonas
- 2021–2022: Almyros
- 2022–: Kalymnikos
- * Club domestic league appearances and goals

Dimitris Volonakis (Greek: Δημήτρης Βολονάκης; born 27 February 1967) is a former professional footballer who played as defender and the current manager of Kalymnikos. Born in Australia, he represented Greece internationally.

== Club career ==
Volonakis started sports in the infrastructure sections of the Greek-speaking team Kingsford Megisty and at the age of 12 he immigrated with his parents to Kalymnos. He initially played at Kalymniakos and in 1984 he moved to the reserve team of AEK Athens.

He successfully competed in the youth and youth departments and in 1987 the manager of the men's team, Todor Veselinović gave him the opportunity to play in the first team of AEK. The following season the new manager, Dušan Bajević used in just one time. On 23 July 1989 he was loaned at Diagoras for a season.

In the following season he left AEK on 15 July 1990 and he signed for Egaleo. There, he played for three seasons and won the promotion to the second division in 1991. Afterwards, he played for 6 months at Olympiacos Volos and returned to Egaleo and in the 1995 he moved to Atromitos playing for a season. He continued his career playing for a season at Ialysos, Egaleo, Leonidio, Achaiki and finished his career at Akarnanikos Fytion in 2001.

== International career ==
In 1985 Volonakis was called to Greece U19, where he had a total of 11 appearances. In the same year, he won 1st place in the Balkan Youth Championship, held at Drama and Kavala. From 1986 to 1988 he was a key member of Greece U21, having 12 appearances and winning 2nd place in the 1988 UEFA European Under-21 Championship, under Andreas Stamatiadis.

== Managerial career ==
In the team that ended his football career, Akarnanikos Fytion, Volonakis started his coaching career in the fourth division in 2001. In 2002 he was the coach of Korfos Elounda of Crete, from 2003 to 2005 he was at Almyros, where he won the amateur cup and from 2005 to 2007 he was at PAO Krousonas, where he emerged champion and was a cup finalist. In the period between 2007 and 2009 he was at Mocho where he made it to local cup final and then again at PAO Krousonas for a year where they also made it to the final of the cup, while in 2010 he returned to Almyros becoming once more the cup finalist. In the summer of 2011 he worked in the OFI U20 team until the summer of 2015, then he worked as an assistant coach for a month in the OFI first team and the rest of the season as the technical director of the OFI academies. In the summer 2016 season he took over the fortunes of PAO Krousonas while since December 2017 he worked for Ermis Zoniana in the third division with whom he won the Rethymno FCA Cup. In the summer of 2018, he took over Almyros, where he lost the championship in the last game of the play-offs. He returned to PAO Krousonas again in October 2019 where finished at the 3rd place. In April 2021, he returned for the fourth time to Almyros where he led them to the fourth place for the championship of the C National League, the best place in the history of the club. From July 2022, he is the manager of Kalymniakos.

== Personal life ==
Volonakis is a graduate of the School of Physical Education and Sport Science department of National and Kapodistrian University of Athens and a certified UEFA A' coach. From 2005 to 2009 he was employed as a gymnast-coach at the Athletic High School of Heraklion in Crete, whose team he led to three Panhellenic championships and participation in the 2009 World Schools Championship in Antalya, Turkey, where he won 13th place.

== Honours ==
=== As a player ===
AEK Athens

- Alpha Ethniki: 1988–89

Leonidio

- Arcadia FCA Cup: 1998–99

Greece U19

- Balkan Youth Championship: 1985

=== As a coach ===
Almyros

- Thessaly FCA League: 2003–04, 2010–11

PAO Krousonas

- Heraklion FCA Championship: 2005−06

Ermis Zoniana

- Rethymno FCA Cup: 2017–18
