= Antonis Manikas =

Greek executive, coach and retired association football player (born 1959)

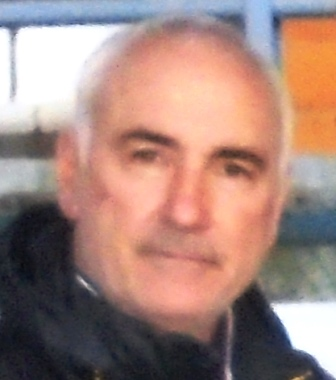

Personal information
- Full name: Antonios Manikas
- Date of birth: 9 February 1959 (age 67)
- Place of birth: Athens, Greece
- Height: 1.83 m (6 ft 0 in)
- Position: Goalkeeper

Youth career
- 1974–1977: Panionios

Senior career*
| Years | Team | Apps | (Gls) |
| 1977–1990 | Panionios | 156 | (0) |
| 1990–1991 | Levadiakos | 25 | (0) |
| 1991–1992 | Ethnikos Piraeus | 0 | (0) |
| 1992–1993 | PAS Giannina | 17 | (0) |
| 1993–1994 | Ethnikos Piraeus | 18 | (0) |
| 1994–1995 | Ethnikos Asteras | 29 | (0) |
| 1995–1998 | Kallithea | 40 | (0) |
| 1998–1999 | Ethnikos Piraeus | 0 | (0) |
| Total | | 285 | (0) |

International career^{‡}
| 1987–1988 | Greece U23 | 5 | (0) |
| 1987–1988 | Greece | 2 | (0) |

Managerial career
- 1997–1998: Kallithea (caretaker)
- 1999–2001: Kallithea
- 2002–2003: Atromitos
- 2003: Ethnikos Asteras
- 2004–2005: Rodos
- 2005: Agios Dimitrios
- 2005–2006: Vyzas Megara
- 2006: Kallithea
- 2006–2007: Ethnikos Asteras
- 2008: Ethnikos Piraeus
- 2008–2010: Ethnikos Asteras
- 2010–2011: Thrasyvoulos
- 2011–2016: Panionios (sporting director)
- 2016–2019: Panionios (scouting director)
- 2019–2023: Apollon Smyrnis (sporting director)
- 2023–2024: Egaleo (sporting director)
- 2025–2026: Iraklis (scouting director)
- * Club domestic league appearances and goals as of June 13, 2026 ‡ National team caps and goals as of February 23, 2025

Antonis Manikas (Greek: Αντώνης Μανίκας, born 9 February 1959) is a Greek retired international professional association football player, who played as goalkeeper, and coach.

== Playing career ==
=== Club ===
Manikas was a goalkeeper. He spent the majority of his career with Panionios, but also played for Levadiakos, PAS Giannina, Ethnikos Piraeus, and Kallithea.

=== International ===
Manikas earned 2 caps for Greece. He made his debut in a friendly against Romania on 11 March 1987.

== Managerial career ==
As a manager, Manikas was announced as the manager of Ethnikos Piraeus on 6 June 2008, but he officially resigned on 10 October 2008, after just four weeks of the Beta Ethniki 2008–09 season.
