= Christos Vasilopoulos (footballer) =

Greek footballer

Personal information
- Full name: Christos Vasilopoulos
- Date of birth: 12 November 1962 (age 63)
- Place of birth: Patras, Greece
- Height: 1.75 m (5 ft 9 in)
- Position: Defender

Senior career*
Years	Team	Apps	(Gls)
1982–1986	Panachaiki		
1986–1993	AEK Athens	134	(2)
1993–1994	Kalamata		
1994–1996	Proodeftiki		
- * Club domestic league appearances and goals

Christos Vasilopoulos (Greek: Χρήστος Βασιλόπουλος; born 12 November 1962) is a former Greek professional footballer who played as a defender.

== Club career ==
Vasilopoulos started his career at Panachaiki, where he distinguished himself in the domestic market. On 27 June 1986 he was transferred to AEK Athens for a fee of 8 million drachmas.

He managed to establish himself at the club mainly as a right back, while he was also used as a left back. Furthermore Dušan Bajević also used him as a sweeper to play one-on-one against an opposition attacker. He was a combative, fast and effective defender, who was turned to be a key player for AEK. With the "yellow-blacks", he won 3 championships, a Greek Super Cup in 1989 and the Greek League Cup in 1990, while he was also the captain of the team for the 1992–93 season. His career at AEK ended relatively ingloriously when on 7 March 1993, a harsh tackle by Stoica in the away match against AEL caused him a fractured shoulder blade. He never managed to return in action despite his repetitive attempts.

In the summer 1993 he left AEK and on 15 July he signed for Kalamata alosngside his teammates Pavlos Papaioannou and Lampros Georgiadis. He spent a year and a half with the club and then moved to Proodeftiki for another a year and a half, where he hung up his football boots in 1996.

== Later career ==
On 22 August 2016, Vasilopoulos returned to AEK Athens, assuming a position in the team's infrastructure departments.

== Honours ==
AEK Athens

- Alpha Ethniki: 1988–89, 1991–92, 1992–93
- Greek Super Cup: 1989
- Greek League Cup: 1990
