= Theologis Papadopoulos =

Greek footballer

Personal information
- Full name: Theologis Papadopoulos
- Date of birth: 12 January 1960 (age 66)
- Place of birth: Thessaloniki, Greece
- Height: 1.82 m (5 ft 11 1/2 in)
- Position: Goalkeeper

Youth career
- 1974–1979: Eleftheriakos Eleftherion

Senior career*
Years	Team	Apps	(Gls)
1979–1984	AEL	54	(0)
1984–1988	AEK Athens	80	(0)
1988–1992	Panionios	103	(0)
1992–1993	Ionikos	10	(0)
Total		237	(0)

International career
1986–1992	Greece	24	(0)
- * Club domestic league appearances and goals

Theologis Papadopoulos (Greek: Θεολόγης Παπαδόπουλος; born 12 January 1960) is a Greek former professional footballer who played as a goalkeeper.

== Club career ==
Papadopoulos started playing football in 1974 from the amateur club Eleftheriakos Eleftherion. In 1979 he joined AEL where he became more widely known competing in the first division.

On 22 June 1984 he was transferred to AEK Athens for a fee of 9 million drachmas. After a few seasons, he was established the main goalkeeper of the club. During his tenure at AEK, he also became an international. On 9 February 1988, even though he was a key player in the team for years, his career at AEK suddenly came to an end. On the eve of the Cup rematch against Olympiacos, the former footballer of AEK, Dinos Ballis visited the team's hotel, offering a bouquet of flowers to Papadopoulos and was eventually suspected of attempted bribery. The match that took place on the following day, Olympiacos won 1–3 and Papadopoulos had a poor performance. The case was transferred to courts, even after Papadopoulos finally reported that there was indeed an attempted bribery. The owners of Olympiacos, the Koskotas brothers and Balis, as an intermediary, were accused of attempting to bribe the players of AEK, Papadopoulos and Vasilakos. Eventually, in an unexpected court decision, everyone was acquitted, except Ballis.

Those incidents resulted in a rupture in the relation of Papadopoulos with the management of AEK, as well as the fans. On 6 July after a court decision, he terminated his contract with the club and a few days later him alongside Vasilakos joined Panionios. He played for the club of Nea Smyrni until 1992 and eventually ended his career in 1993 at Ionikos.

== International career ==
Papadopoulos appeared in 24 matches for the Greece from 1986 to 1992.
