= 1989–90 AEK Athens F.C. season =

AEK Athens
1989–90 season
- Chairman: Stratos Gidopoulos
- Manager: Dušan Bajević
- Stadium: AEK Stadium
- Alpha Ethniki: 3rd
- Greek Cup: Round of 32
- Greek Super Cup: Winners
- Greek League Cup: Winners
- European Cup: Second round
- Top goalscorer: League: Daniel Batista (15); All: Daniel Batista (17)
- Highest home attendance: 33,260 vs Marseille (1 November 1989)
- Lowest home attendance: 3,265 vs Alexandreia (2 September 1989)
- Average home league attendance: 11,897
- Biggest win: AEK Athens 8–0 Xanthi
- Biggest defeat: Iraklis 3–1 AEK Athens; OFI 3–1 AEK Athens; Marseille 2–0 AEK Athens; Ionikos 2–0 AEK Athens
Home colours	Away colours	Third colours

The 1989–90 season was the 66th season in the existence of AEK Athens F.C. and the 31st consecutive season in the top flight of Greek football. They competed in the Alpha Ethniki, the Greek Cup, the Greek Super Cup, the Greek League Cup and the European Cup. The season began on 26 August 1989 and finished on 2 June 1990.

== Kits ==
Supplier: Diadora
Sponsor(s): Ethniki Asfalistiki

Home	Away	Third

== Overview ==
With Stratos Gidopoulos as president and Dušan Bajević as manager for the second consecutive season, AEK entered the season as the reigning Greek champions. The signing of Daniel Batista further strengthened the squad and raised expectations for another successful season.

The season was began on a positive note as AEK won their first Super Cup, defeating Panathinaikos on penalties after a 1–1 draw following extra time. Shortly afterwards, AEK overturned a 1–0 first-leg defeat to Dynamo Dresden in the first round of the European Cup, recording a memorable 5–3 victory at AEK Stadium to progress. In the second round, they were drawn against Marseille of Bernard Tapie. In the first leg in Marseille, the referee disallowed a legitimate goal by Patikas and AEK were defeated 2–0. The rematch at Nea Filadelfeia ended in a 1–1 draw, eliminating AEK from the tournament. In addition to their elimination, the French reported an attack on their bus and UEFA eventually punished the yellow-blacks with one-year ban from all European competitions.

In the Cup, AEK finished top of their group without suffering a defeat, but were unexpectedly eliminated by newly promoted Ionikos in the round of 32 for the second consecutive season.

Domestically, AEK conceded the fewest goals in the league for the second successive season, but finished runners-up to Panathinaikos. Among the highlights of their league campaign were an 8–0 victory over Skonda Xanthi and a 7–1 win against Panionios. Daniel Batista finished as the club's top scorer with 15 goals.

AEK concluded their season by winning the Greek League Cup, defeating Olympiacos in the final on 2 June. It was the only edition of the competition ever held.

Notable performers during the season included Savevski, Okoński, Daniel Batista, Manolas, Savvidis, Patikas and Christodoulou.

== Management team ==
Position	Staff
Manager	(Socialist Federal Republic of Yugoslavia) Dušan Bajević
Assistant manager	(Greece) Petros Ravousis
Goalkeeping coach	(Greece) Stelios Serafidis
Scout	(Greece) Aris Tsachouridis
Head of Medical	(Greece) Lakis Nikolaou

== Players ==
=== Squad information ===
NOTE: The players are the ones that have been announced by the AEK Athens' press release. No edits should be made unless a player arrival or exit is announced. Updated 2 June 1990, 23:59 UTC+3.

Player	Nat.	Position(s)	Date of birth (Age)	Signed	Previous club	Transfer fee	Contract until
Goalkeepers
Antonis Minou (Vice-captain 2)	(Greece)	GK	4 May 1958 (aged 32)	1988	(Greece) Panathinaikos	₯50,000,000	1991
Spyros Ikonomopoulos	(Greece)	GK	25 July 1959 (aged 30)	1979	(Greece) AEK Athens U20	—	1993
Fanis Kofinas	(Greece)	GK	5 September 1960 (aged 29)	1982	(Greece) Pelopas Kiato	Free	1992
Defenders
Makis Chatzis	(Greece)	RB / LB	30 March 1957 (aged 33)	1984	(Greece) Apollon Athens	₯6,750,000	1994
Takis Karagiozopoulos (Vice-captain)	(Greece)	CB / DM / ST	4 February 1961 (aged 29)	1981	(Greece) Veria	₯8,000,000	1991
Stelios Manolas (Vice-captain 3)	(Greece)	CB / RB	13 July 1961 (aged 28)	1980	(Greece) AEK Athens U20	—	1993
Giorgos Peppes	(Greece)	CB	26 October 1961 (aged 28)	1986	(Greece) Ethnikos Piraeus	₯10,000,000	1991
Christos Vasilopoulos	(Greece)	RB / LB	12 November 1962 (aged 27)	1987	(Greece) Panachaiki	Free	1991
Georgios Koutoulas	(Greece)	CB / LB	9 February 1967 (aged 23)	1987	(Greece) AEK Athens U20	—	1993
Midfielders
Mirosław Okoński	(Poland)	AM / ST / SS	8 December 1958 (aged 31)	1988	(West Germany) Hamburger SV	₯100,000,000	1991
Pavlos Papaioannou (Captain)	(Greece) (Brazil)	DM / RB / LB / RM	19 May 1959 (aged 31)	1983	(Greece) Rodos	₯10,000,000	1993
Giorgos Savvidis	(Cyprus)	RM / AM / RW / SS / ST	8 February 1961 (aged 29)	1987	(Cyprus) Omonia	₯20,940,600	1992
Lampros Georgiadis	(Greece)	LM / AM / LB	11 July 1963 (aged 26)	1986	(Greece) Anagennisi Arta	₯11,000,000	1991
Toni Savevski	(Socialist Federal Republic of Yugoslavia)	CM / LM / DM	14 July 1963 (aged 26)	1988	(Socialist Federal Republic of Yugoslavia) Vardar	₯34,000,000	1991
Jim Patikas	(Australia) (Greece)	RM / LM / RW / LW / SS	18 October 1963 (aged 26)	1985	(Australia) Sydney Croatia	₯5,000,000	1991
Stavros Stamatis	(Greece)	DM / CM / CB / RB / LB / AM	31 January 1966 (aged 24)	1988	(Greece) Charavgiakos	₯22,000,000	1993
Giorgos Famelis	(Greece)	CM / DM	19 August 1967 (aged 22)	1988	(Greece) AO Vouliagmeni	₯3,000,000	1991
Panagiotis Pangratis	(Greece)	AM / CM / DM	4 May 1971 (aged 19)	1989	(Greece) Galatsi	₯2,200,000	1991
Giorgos Papakostoulis	(Greece)	CM	2 October 1971 (aged 18)	1988	(Greece) Atromitos Agioi Anargyroi	Free	1991
Forwards
Daniel Batista	(Cape Verde) (Netherlands)	ST / SS / AM	9 September 1964 (aged 25)	1989	(Greece) Ethnikos Piraeus	Free	1992
Frank Klopas	(United States) (Greece)	SS / ST / AM	1 September 1966 (aged 23)	1988	(United States) Chicago Sting	Free	1993
Georgios Christodoulou	(Greece)	ST / SS / LW	20 May 1967 (aged 23)	1985	(Greece) Akratitos	Free	1993
Spyros Goumas	(Greece)	ST	24 February 1970 (aged 20)	1989	(Greece) AEK Athens U20	—	1992
Left during Winter Transfer Window
Dimosthenis Batalis	(Australia) (Greece)	ST	20 June 1964 (aged 26)	1988	(Australia) Sydney Olympic	Free	1991

== Transfers ==
=== In ===
==== Summer ====
Pos.	Player	From	Fee	Date	Contract Until	Source
DF	(Greece) Theodosis Kokotos	(Greece) Kallithea	Loan return	1 July 1989	30 June 1990	
MF	(Greece) Panagiotis Pangratis	(Greece) Galatsi	₯2,200,000	24 July 1989	30 June 1990	
FW	(Greece) Michalis Manginas	(Greece) Kallithea	Loan return	1 July 1989	30 June 1991	
FW	(Cape Verde) Daniel Batista	(Greece) Ethnikos Piraeus	Free transfer	1 July 1989	30 June 1992	
FW	(Greece) Spyros Goumas	(Greece) AEK Athens U20	Promotion	1 July 1989	30 June 1992	

=== Out ===
==== Summer ====
Pos.	Player	To	Fee	Date	Source
DF	(Greece) Michalis Karousis	Free agent	End of contract	1 July 1989	
DF	(Greece) Theodosis Kokotos	Free agent	Contract termination	1 September 1989	
MF	(Greece) Dimitris Pittas	Free agent	Contract termination	16 July 1989	
FW	(Cyprus) Giannakis Ioannou	(Cyprus) Pezoporikos	Free transfer	24 July 1989	

=== Loan out ===
==== Summer ====
Pos.	Player	To	Fee	Date	Until	Option to buy	Source
DF	(Greece) Dimitris Volonakis	(Greece) Diagoras	Free	23 July 1989	30 June 1990	✗	
MF	(Greece) Charalampos Zarotiadis	(Greece) Kallithea	Free	24 July 1989	30 June 1990	✗	
FW	(Greece) Michalis Manginas	(Greece) Kallithea	Free	29 July 1989	30 June 1990	✗	

==== Winter ====
Pos.	Player	To	Fee	Date	Until	Option to buy	Source
FW	(Australia) Dimosthenis Batalis	(Greece) Kallithea	Free	16 December 1989	30 June 1990	✗	

=== Contract renewals ===
Pos.	Player	Date	Former Exp. Date	New Exp. Date	Source
GK	(Greece) Spyros Ikonomopoulos	14 July 1989	30 June 1989	30 June 1993	
DF	(Greece) Makis Chatzis	14 July 1989	30 June 1989	30 June 1994	
MF	(Poland) Mirosław Okoński	18 June 1990	30 June 1990	30 June 1991	
MF	(Greece) Panagiotis Pangratis	18 June 1990	30 June 1990	30 June 1991	

=== Overall transfer activity ===
==== Expenditure ====
Summer: ▼ ₯2,200,000

Winter: ▼ ₯0

Total: ▼ ₯2,200,000

==== Income ====
Summer: ▲ ₯0

Winter: ▲ ₯0

Total: ▲ ₯0

==== Net Totals ====
Summer: ▼ ₯2,200,000

Winter: ₯0

Total: ▼ ₯2,200,000

== Pre-season and friendlies ==
16 July 1989 Friendly	FC Mulhouse	1–2	AEK Athens	Mulhouse
17:30 EEST (UTC+3)	Slišković 30'	Report	Christodoulou 49'; Patikas 71'	Stadium: Stade de l'Ill; Referee: Mayech (France)

21 July 1989 Friendly	Filderstadt mixed	2–4	AEK Athens	Filderstadt
19:00 EEST (UTC+3)	Berger 31', 44' (pen.)	Report	Okoński 15'; Batista 17', 25'; Georgiadis 63'	Stadium: Fleinsbachstadion; Attendance: 1,500

28 July 1989 Friendly	1. FC Pforzheim	0–1	AEK Athens	Pforzheim
18:00 EEST (UTC+3)		Report	Batista 10'	Stadium: Stadion im Brötzinger Tal

31 July 1989 Friendly	FC Emmendingen	2–2	AEK Athens	Emmendingen
18:30 EEST (UTC+3)	Rener 34', 35'	Report	Batista 43'; Manolas 80'	Stadium: Elzstadion

2 August 1989 Friendly	FC Singen 04	0–2	AEK Athens	Singen
19:00 EEST (UTC+3)		Report	Christodoulou 60', 65'	Stadium: Hohentwielstadion

7 August 1989 Friendly	AEK Athens	1–0	Galatasaray	Marousi
21:00 EEST (UTC+3)	Patikas 2'	Report		Stadium: Olympic Stadium; Attendance: 10,515; Referee: Makis Germanakos (Athens)

9 August 1989 Friendly	Panionios	2–2	AEK Athens	Nea Smyrni
21:00 EEST (UTC+3)	Michos 5'; Aposporis 75'	Report	Savvidis 9'; Karagiozopoulos 90'	Stadium: Nea Smyrni Stadium; Attendance: 4,689; Referee: Giorgos Giannopoulos (Athens)

13 August 1989 Friendly	AEK Athens	3–3	Iraklis	Nea Smyrni
20:00 EEST (UTC+3)	Savevski 6' (pen.); Patikas 34', 66'	Report	Papadopoulos (penalty missed) 12'; Th. Dimopoulos 24', 59'; Toutziaris 58'	Stadium: Nea Smyrni Stadium; Attendance: 5,097; Referee: Christos Kolokythas (Athens)

25 August 1989 Friendly	AEK Athens	2–2	Olympiacos	Nea Filadelfeia
21:00 EEST (UTC+3)	Savevski 6' (pen.); Christodoulou 63'	Report	Détári 7'; Tsalouchidis 65'	Stadium: AEK Stadium; Attendance: 40,000; Referee: Christos Kolokythas (Athens)
Note: When Olympiacos made the score 2–2, the match was suspended by the referee, due to incidents between the fans of both clubs. AEK were later punished with two games behind closed doors.

7 September 1989 Friendly	AEK Athens	7–0	Drapetsona	Thrakomakedones
18:00 EEST (UTC+3)	Papaioannou 17', 37'; Manolas 21'; Okoński 33'; Stamatis 34'; Patikas 65', 78'	Report		Stadium: AEK Athens' Training Complex

23 January 1990 Friendly	Galatasaray	3–2	AEK Athens	İzmir
19:00 EET (UTC+2)	Tütüneker 1'; Vezir 5'; Tüfekçi 20'	Report	Batista 55', 57'	Stadium: İzmir Atatürk Stadium; Attendance: 13,000; Referee: Ahmet Amat (Turkey)

6 April 1990 Friendly	AEK Athens	13–0	Pitisia ΧΙ	Thrakomakedones
16:30 EEST (UTC+3)	Batista; Okoński; Savvidis; Famelis; Papakostoulis; Goumas; Katrimoustakis	Report		Stadium: AEK Athens' Training Complex

== Competitions ==
=== Overall record ===
Competition	First match	Last match	Starting round	Final position	Record							
Competition	First match	Last match	Starting round	Final position	Pld	W	D	L	GF	GA	GD	Win %
Alpha Ethniki	17 September 1989	27 May 1990	Matchday 1	2nd	34	20	10	4	64	18	+46	58.82
Greek Cup	20 August 1989	20 December 1989	Group Stage	Round of 32	6	3	2	1	9	4	+5	50.00
Greek Super Cup	30 August 1989		Final	Winners	1	0	1	0	1	1	+0	0.00
Greek League Cup	31 January 1990	2 June 1990	First round	Winners	5	3	2	0	12	7	+5	60.00
European Cup	13 September 1989	1 November 1989	First round	Second round	4	1	1	2	6	7	−1	25.00
Total					50	27	16	7	92	37	+55	54.00

Last updated: 2 June 1990
Source: Competitions

=== Alpha Ethniki ===
==== League table ====
Pos	Team	Pld	W	D	L	GF	GA	GD	Pts	Qualification or relegation
1	Panathinaikos (C)	34	21	11	2	75	35	+40	53	Qualification for European Cup first round
2	AEK Athens	34	20	10	4	64	18	+46	50	One-year ban from European competitions (Note: AEK Athens were punished with a one-year ban from all European competitions by the UEFA disciplinary committee after being charged for the eventful European Cup match against Marseille on 1 November 1989.)
3	PAOK	34	19	8	7	49	26	+23	46	Qualification for UEFA Cup first round
4	Olympiacos	34	18	9	7	60	37	+23	45	Qualification for Cup Winners' Cup first round
5	Iraklis	34	14	11	9	44	36	+8	39	Qualification for UEFA Cup first round

Source: RSSSF
Rules for classification: 1st points; 2nd head-to-head points; 3rd head-to-head goal difference; 4th decision match.
(C) Champions

==== Results summary ====
Overall								Home						Away					
Pld	W	D	L	GF	GA	GD	Pts	W	D	L	GF	GA	GD	W	D	L	GF	GA	GD
34	20	10	4	64	18	+46	50	14	3	0	50	6	+44	6	7	4	14	12	+2

Source: Competitive matches

==== Results by Matchday ====
Round	1	2	3	4	5	6	7	8	9	10	11	12	13	14	15	16	17	18	19	20	21	22	23	24	25	26	27	28	29	30	31	32	33	34
Ground	A	H	A	H	A	H	A	H	A	H	H	A	H	A	H	A	H	H	A	H	A	H	A	H	A	H	A	A	H	A	H	A	H	A
Result	D	W	L	W	W	D	W	D	W	W	W	D	W	D	W	W	D	W	W	W	L	D	L	W	W	L	W	D	W	W	D	W	D	W
Position	5	6	6	8	7	5	2	5	2	3	3	3	3	2	2	2	2	1	1	1	3	2	3	3	3	3	3	4	4	2	2	2	2	2

Source: Competitive matches
A = Away; H = Home; W = Win; D = Draw; L = Loss; P = Postponed

==== Matches ====
17 September 1989 1	PAOK	1–1	AEK Athens	Thessaloniki
17:00 EEST (UTC+3)	Skartados 30' (pen.); Small (yellow card) 35'; Osvold (yellow card) 37'		Vasilopoulos (yellow card) 5'; Koutoulas (yellow card) 35'; Okoński 72'	Stadium: Toumba Stadium; Attendance: 35,346; Referee: Vassilios Nikakis (Aetoloacarnania)

24 September 1989 2	AEK Athens	2–1	Ethnikos Piraeus	Nea Filadelfeia
15:30 EEST (UTC+3)	Patikas 35'; Savevski (penalty missed) 64'; Batista 74'		Gerothodoros (yellow card) 19' (yellow-red card) 44'; N. Manolas (yellow card) 68'; Chojnacki 86'	Stadium: AEK Stadium; Attendance: Behind closed doors Referee: Alexandros Naziris (Thessaloniki)
Note: The match was held behind closed doors, due to punishment for the incidents in the friendly match against Olympiacos.

1 October 1989 3	AEL	1–0	AEK Athens	Larissa
15:30 EEST (UTC+3)	Tsibinis (yellow card); Vasilopoulos 72' (o.g.)			Stadium: Alcazar Stadium; Attendance: 13,925; Referee: Stratos Kannos (Athens)

8 October 1989 4	AEK Athens	4–0	Iraklis	Nea Filadelfeia
15:30 EEST (UTC+3)	Christodoulou 26'; Patikas 28'; Savvidis 60'; Batista 77'			Stadium: AEK Stadium; Attendance: Behind closed doors Referee: Kostas Adamopoulos (Athens)
Note: The match was held behind closed doors, due to punishment for the incidents in the friendly match against Olympiacos.

15 October 1989 5	Aris	1–2	AEK Athens	Thessaloniki
15:00 EEST (UTC+3)	Dimitriadis (yellow card); Tsourelas (yellow card); Kouis 71'		Vasilopoulos (yellow card); Christodoulou (yellow card); Savevski 28'; Batista 79'	Stadium: Aris Stadium; Attendance: 13,804; Referee: Makis Germanakos (Athens)

22 October 1989 6	AEK Athens	0–0	Olympiacos	Nea Filadelfeia
15:00 EEST (UTC+3)				Stadium: AEK Stadium; Attendance: 26,096; Referee: Kostas Dimitriadis (Piraeus)

28 October 1989 7	AEK Athens	7–1	Panionios	Nea Filadelfeia
15:00 EEST (UTC+3)	Batista 20', 36', 55', 75'; Savvidis 34'; Patikas 49', 69'		Mavros 26'; Marangos (yellow card) 55'	Stadium: AEK Stadium; Attendance: 20,557; Referee: Periklis Vasilakis (Athens)
Note: When Thomas Mavros scored against AEK, the whole stadium applauded him.

8 November 1989 8	Doxa Drama	1–1	AEK Athens	Drama
15:00 EET (UTC+2)	Michalitsos (yellow card); Sofronoglou (yellow card); Chionas 29'		Peppes (yellow card); Batista 65', (yellow card)	Stadium: Doxa Drama Stadium; Attendance: 5,361; Referee: Giorgos Giannopoulos (Athens)
Note: The game was scheduled for 5 November, but it was postponed due the parliamentary elections.

12 November 1989 9	AEK Athens	2–0	OFI	Nea Filadelfeia
15:00 EET (UTC+2)	Patikas 32'; Batista 55'; Okoński (penalty missed) 67'; Papaioannou (yellow card) 79'		Tsimpos (yellow card) 67'; Chosadas (yellow card) 81'	Stadium: AEK Stadium; Attendance: 16,267; Referee: Kostas Kortsaris (Thessaloniki)

19 November 1989 10	Panserraikos	0–1	AEK Athens	Serres
14:45 EET (UTC+2)	Konstantinidis (yellow card) 75'; Athanasiadis (yellow card) 80'		Batista 32'; Manolas (yellow card) 77'	Stadium: Serres Municipal Stadium; Attendance: 7,004; Referee: Alexandros Naziris (Thessaloniki)

26 November 1989 11	AEK Athens	2–0	Ionikos	Nea Filadelfeia
14:45 EET (UTC+2)	Christodoulou 29'; Okoński 54'		Belias (yellow card) 56'	Stadium: AEK Stadium; Attendance: 14,110; Referee: Ilias Karamanis (Boeotia)

3 December 1989 12	Olympiacos Volos	1–1	AEK Athens	Volos
14:45 EET (UTC+2)	Tsoukalas (yellow card); Mavrodimos (penalty missed) 43'; Karamichalos 73', (yellow card)		Okoński 65'	Stadium: Volos Municipal Stadium; Attendance: 7,044; Referee: Giorgos Koukoulas (Lesbos)

10 December 1989 13	AEK Athens	8–0	Xanthi	Nea Filadelfeia
14:45 EET (UTC+2)	Christodoulou 28', 52', 64'; Patikas 31', 43'; Okoński 72'; Famelis 77'; Karagiozopoulos 89' (pen.)		Chatziapostolidis (yellow card)	Stadium: AEK Stadium; Attendance: 9,587; Referee: Lefteris Fillipidis (Patra)

17 December 1989 14	Panathinaikos	0–0	AEK Athens	Marousi
14:45 EET (UTC+2)	L. Christodoulou (yellow card); Chatziathanasiou (yellow card); Kalitzakis (yellow card); Georgamlis (yellow card)		Karagiozopoulos (yellow card); Patikas (yellow card); Papaioannou (yellow card); Manolas (yellow card)	Stadium: Olympic Stadium; Attendance: 51,797; Referee: Vassilios Nikakis (Aetoloacarnania)

7 January 1990 15	Levadiakos	0–1	AEK Athens	Levadia
14:45 EET (UTC+2)	Jonuz (yellow card) 14'; Martinaios (yellow card) 37'		Manolas (yellow card) (yellow-red card) 67'; Peppes (yellow card) 10'; Patikas (yellow card) 14'; Savvidis 15'	Stadium: Levadia Municipal Stadium; Attendance: 4,548; Referee: Giorgos Koukoulas (Lesbos)

14 January 1990 16	AEK Athens	2–0	Apollon Athens	Nea Filadelfeia
14:45 EET (UTC+2)	Vasilopoulos 11'; Batista 39'; Famelis (yellow card) 79'		Fabiatos (yellow card) 8'; Emmanouil (yellow card) 25'; Mangioros (yellow card) 56'	Stadium: AEK Stadium; Attendance: 13,712; Referee: Giorgos Bikas (Chalkidiki)

21 January 1990 17	Apollon Kalamarias	0–0	AEK Athens	Thessaloniki
14:45 EET (UTC+2)	Traianopoulos (yellow card); Borbokis (yellow card)		Karagiozopoulos (yellow card)	Stadium: Kalamaria Stadium; Attendance: 5,087; Referee: Naoum Mintiouris (Serres)

28 January 1990 18	AEK Athens	2–1	PAOK	Nea Filadelfeia
14:45 EET (UTC+2)	Batista 2'; Vasilopoulos (yellow card) 80'; Savevski 85'; Manolas (yellow card) 88'; Peppes (red card) 89'		Mitsibonas 11', (yellow card) 87'; Alexoulis (yellow card) 16'; Malioufas (yellow card) 56'; Tolba (yellow card) 58'; Skartados (yellow card) 67'; Leontiadis (yellow card) 70'	Stadium: AEK Stadium; Attendance: 18,255; Referee: Makis Germanakos (Athens)

4 February 1990 19	Ethnikos Piraeus	0–3	AEK Athens	Piraeus
14:45 EET (UTC+2)	Antonopoulos (yellow card) 61'; Kardaris (yellow card) 65' (yellow-red card) 84'; Tsibakis (yellow card) 90'		Patikas 26'; Savevski 42'; Savvidis 88'	Stadium: Karaiskakis Stadium; Attendance: 15,136; Referee: Naoum Mintiouris (Serres)

11 February 1990 20	AEK Athens	3–1	AEL	Nea Filadelfeia
15:00 EET (UTC+2)	Okoński 22', 56'; Vasilopoulos (yellow card) 23'; Patikas 87'		Karapialis 26'; Nasiakos (yellow card) 55'; Keramidas (yellow card) 65'	Stadium: AEK Stadium; Attendance: 12,374; Referee: Giorgos Koukoulakis (Heraklion)

14 March 1990 21	Iraklis	3–1	AEK Athens	Thessaloniki
15:30 EET (UTC+2)	Boere 21', 33'; Kostis 45'; Jovanović (yellow card) 90'		Peppes (yellow card) 25'; Batista 49', (yellow card) 77'	Stadium: Kaftanzoglio Stadium; Attendance: 8,764; Referee: Kostas Dimitriadis (Piraeus)
Note: The game was initially scheduled for 18 February, but was postponed due to a strike by employees of National Athletic Facilities.

25 February 1990 22	AEK Athens	1–1	Aris	Nea Filadelfeia
15:00 EET (UTC+2)	Iosifidis 82' (o.g.)		Moustakidis (yellow card) 39'; Kouis (yellow card) 50'; Dimitriadis (yellow card) 70', (goal) 81'	Stadium: AEK Stadium; Attendance: 13,700; Referee: Giorgos Giannopoulos (Athens)

4 March 1990 23	Olympiacos	1–0	AEK Athens	Piraeus
15:30 EET (UTC+2)	Kalogeropoulos (yellow card); Rantos (yellow card); Karataidis (yellow card); Apostolakis 78'		Vasilopoulos (yellow card)	Stadium: Karaiskakis Stadium; Attendance: 15,634; Referee: Makis Germanakos (Athens)

11 March 1990 24	Panionios	0–1	AEK Athens	Nea Smyrni
15:30 EET (UTC+2)			Christodoulou 40'; Savevski (yellow card) 65'; Stamatis (yellow card) 67'; Savvidis (yellow card) 89'	Stadium: Nea Smyrni Stadium; Attendance: 8,774; Referee: Dimitris Bentas (Trikala)

18 March 1990 25	AEK Athens	1–0	Doxa Drama	Nea Filadelfeia
15:30 EET (UTC+2)	Savvidis 49'		Sofronoglou (yellow card) 43'; Chionas (yellow card) 66'	Stadium: AEK Stadium; Attendance: 7,017; Referee: Christos Kolokythas (Athens)

25 March 1990 26	OFI	3–1	AEK Athens	Heraklion
16:30 EET (UTC+2)	Kavouras 4', (yellow card) 85'; Vlastos 35'; Vavoulas (yellow card) 55'; Goulis 65'; Nioplias (yellow card) 89'		Batista (yellow card) 15'; Patikas 44'; Okoński (yellow card) 69'	Stadium: Theodoros Vardinogiannis Stadium; Attendance: 9,730; Referee: Lefteris Filippidis (Patras)

1 April 1990 27	AEK Athens	4–0	Panserraikos	Nea Filadelfeia
16:30 EEST (UTC+3)	Manolas (yellow card) 7', (goal) 78'; Okoński 33'; Savvidis 35', (yellow card) 64'; Patikas 69'; Vasilopoulos (yellow card) 72'		Konstantinidis (yellow card) 62'	Stadium: AEK Stadium; Attendance: 7,267; Referee: Nikos Vournelis (Thessaloniki)

10 April 1990 28	Ionikos	0–0	AEK Athens	Nikaia
16:30 EEST (UTC+3)	Papadopoulos (yellow card) 48'		Patikas (yellow card) 48'; Papaioannou (yellow card) 76'	Stadium: Neapoli Municipal Stadium; Attendance: 4,783; Referee: Giorgos Koukoulas (Lesbos)

22 April 1990 29	AEK Athens	4–0	Olympiacos Volos	Nea Filadelfeia
17:00 EEST (UTC+3)	Batista 19'; Christodoulou 42'; Manolas 70', 83'; Savevski (yellow card) 77'		Boda (yellow card) 27'	Stadium: AEK Stadium; Attendance: 7,829; Referee: Nikos Vournelis (Thessaloniki)

29 April 1990 30	Xanthi	0–1	AEK Athens	Xanthi
17:30 EEST (UTC+3)	Chalkidis (penalty missed) 30'		Famelis (yellow card); Karagiozopoulos (yellow card); Georgiadis 6'; Minou (yellow card) 29'	Stadium: A.O. Xanthi Stadium; Attendance: 11,205; Referee: Sotiris Vorgias (Athens)

6 May 1990 31	AEK Athens	1–1	Panathinaikos	Nea Filadelfeia
17:30 EEST (UTC+3)	Vasilopoulos (yellow card) 9'; Georgiadis (yellow card) 69'; G. Christodoulou (yellow card) 71'; Savevski 72' (pen.)		Kalitzakis (yellow card) 15'; Kalantzis (yellow card) 30'; Chatziathanasiou (yellow card) 55'; Antoniou 67'; Saravakos (yellow card) 87'	Stadium: AEK Stadium; Attendance: 25,470; Referee: Stavros Zakestidis (Thessaloniki)

13 May 1990 32	AEK Athens	4–0	Levadiakos	Nea Filadelfeia
17:30 EEST (UTC+3)	Vasilopoulos (yellow card) 13'; Georgiadis 45'; Savevski 53'; Batista 55'; Christodoulou 86'		Kasdovasilis (yellow card) 31'	Stadium: AEK Stadium; Attendance: 6,475; Referee: Giorgos Koukoulas (Lesbos)

20 May 1990 33	Apollon Athens	0–0	AEK Athens	Rizoupoli
17:30 EEST (UTC+3)	Pozapalidis (yellow card) 68'; Fabiatos (yellow card) 76'; Kolitsidakis (yellow card) 86'		Vasilopoulos (yellow card) 56'; Georgiadis (yellow card) 76'; Patikas (yellow card) 77'; Minou (yellow card) 81'	Stadium: Rizoupoli Stadium; Attendance: 4,901; Referee: Sotiris Vorgias (Athens)

27 May 1990 34	AEK Athens	3–0	Apollon Kalamarias	Nea Filadelfeia
17:30 EEST (UTC+3)	Manolas (yellow card) 24'; Savvidis 32'; Famelis 59'; Pangratis 88'		Savvakis (yellow card) 35'	Stadium: AEK Stadium; Attendance: 3,611; Referee: Nikos Vournelis (Thessaloniki)

=== Greek Cup ===
==== Group 5 ====
Pos	Team	Pld	W	D	L	GF	GA	GD	Pts	Qualification	AEK	PAR	ALE	ASA	ANA
1	AEK Athens	4	3	1	0	9	2	+7	7	Round of 32		1–0	1–1	—	—
2	Panargiakos	4	2	1	1	4	3	+1	5	Round of 32	—		1–0	—	2–1
3	Alexandreia	4	2	1	1	0	2	−2	5		—	—		2–0	1–0
4	Anagennisi Karditsa	4	0	2	2	2	7	−5	2		0–3	1–1	—		—
5	Anagennisi Arta	4	0	1	3	3	8	−5	1		1–4	—	—	1–1	

Source: epo.gr

==== Matches ====
20 August 1989 1	AEK Athens	1–0	Panargiakos	Marousi
21:00 EEST (UTC+3)	Patikas 53'	Report		Stadium: Olympic Stadium; Attendance: 5,459; Referee: Thanasis Syrmakezis (Larissa)

27 August 1989 2	Anagennisi Karditsa	0–3	AEK Athens	Karditsa
17:30 EEST (UTC+3)			Patikas 58', 62'; Savvidis 90'	Stadium: Municipal Stadium of Karditsa; Attendance: 2,677; Referee: Stavros Zakestidis (Thessaloniki)

2 September 1989 3	AEK Athens	1–1	Alexandreia	Nea Filadelfeia
21:00 EEST (UTC+3)	Okoński 51' (pen.)	Report	Gardis (yellow card); Papadimitriou 84'	Stadium: AEK Stadium; Attendance: 3,265; Referee: Lefteris Filippidis (Patras)

4 October 1989 4	Anagennisi Arta	1–4	AEK Athens	Aneza
15:30 EEST (UTC+3)	Nikou 30'		Peppes 51'; Batalis 60'; Christodoulou 69'; Stamatis 71'	Stadium: Aneza Stadium; Attendance: 1,500; Referee: Lefteris Filippidis (Patras)

===== Round of 32 =====
29 November 1989 First leg	Ionikos	2–0	AEK Athens	Nikaia
15:30 EET (UTC+2)	Gribilas 11'; Tsiolis 60'	Report		Stadium: Neapoli Municipal Stadium; Attendance: 3,044; Referee: Theodoros Kefalas (Athens)

20 December 1989 Second leg	AEK Athens	0–0 (0–2 agg.)	Ionikos	Nea Filadelfeia
15:30 EET (UTC+2)			Kaltaveridis (red card) 57'	Stadium: AEK Stadium; Referee: Ilias Doutsias (Piraeus)

=== Greek Super Cup ===
30 August 1989 Final	AEK Athens	1–1 (6–5 p)	Panathinaikos	Marousi
21:00 EEST (UTC+3)	Christodoulou 78'; Patikas (yellow card) 113'; Stamatis (yellow card) 119'	Report	Vlachos 47'; Georgamlis (yellow card) 57'; Georgakopoulos (yellow card) 87'; Chatziathanasiou (yellow card) 99'	Stadium: Olympic Stadium; Attendance: 39,300; Referee: Makis Germanakos (Athens)
	Penalties
	Savevski (penalty scored); Vasilopoulos (penalty scored); Karagiozopoulos (penalty scored); Stamatis (penalty scored); Okoński (penalty scored); Manolas (penalty scored)		(penalty scored) Vlachos; (penalty scored) Georgamlis; (penalty scored) Georgakopoulos; (penalty scored) Sarganis; (penalty scored) Saravakos; (penalty missed) Kalantzis

=== Greek League Cup ===
==== Matches ====
31 January 1990 First round	Panionios	3–3 (a.e.t.) (1–3 p)	AEK Athens	Nea Smyrni
14:30 EET (UTC+2)	Vasilakos (penalty missed) 49'; Karavidas 49'; Mavros 58'; Aposporis 99'	Report	Christodoulou 6'; Famelis 86'; Karagiozopoulos 116' (pen.)	Stadium: Nea Smyrni Stadium; Referee: Giorgos Giannopoulos (Athens)
	Penalties
	Vasilakos (penalty missed); Argyriou (penalty missed); Chatzimoisiadis (penalty scored); Bershemi (penalty missed)		(penalty scored) Karagiozopoulos; (penalty scored) Batista; (penalty missed) Famelis; (penalty scored) Stamatis

18 April 1990 Quarter-finals	AEK Athens	5–2	Aris	Nea Filadelfeia
16:30 EEST (UTC+3)	Patikas 17'; Savevski 37'; Savvidis 67'; Batista 75', 88'	Report	Alexandridis 77', 90'	Stadium: AEK Stadium; Attendance: 12,000; Referee: Dimitris Bentas (Trikala)

===== Semi-finals =====
9 May 1990 First leg	Levadiakos	0–0	AEK Athens	Levadia
17:30 EEST (UTC+3)	Gonias (penalty missed) 43'	Report		Stadium: Levadia Municipal Stadium; Attendance: 857; Referee: Naoum Mintiouris (Serres)

23 May 1990 Second leg	AEK Athens	1–0 (1–0 agg.)	Levadiakos	Nea Filadelfeia
17:30 EEST (UTC+3)	Okoński 8'	Report	Kasapis (yellow card) 22'	Stadium: AEK Stadium; Attendance: 4,000; Referee: Stelios Charlavanis (Euboea)

===== Final =====
2 June 1990 Final	ΑΕΚ Athens	3–2	Olympiacos	Marousi
20:30 EEST (UTC+3)	G. Savvidis 8', 15'; Kofinas (yellow card) 36'; Savevski 53'	Report	Kofidis (penalty missed) 36'; Kalogeropoulos 44'; I. Savvidis 76'	Stadium: Olympic Stadium; Attendance: 22,289; Referee: Makis Germanakos (Athens)

=== European Cup ===
==== First round ====
13 September 1989 First leg	Dynamo Dresden (East Germany)	1–0	(Greece) AEK Athens	Dresden, East Germany
21:00 EEST (UTC+3)	Diebitz (yellow card) 18'; Schößler (yellow card) 29'; Lieberam 75'	Report	Vasilopoulos (yellow card) 16'; Savevski (yellow card) 18'; Patikas (yellow card) 71'; Savvidis (yellow card) 73'; Stamatis (red card) 76'	Stadium: Dynamo-Stadion; Attendance: 33,014; Referee: Carlos Silva Valente (Portugal)

27 September 1989 Second leg	AEK Athens (Greece)	5–3 (5–4 agg.)	(East Germany) Dynamo Dresden	Athens, Greece
21:00 EEST (UTC+3)	Manolas 27'; Okoński 33' (pen.); Savvidis 37', 60'; Koutoulas (yellow card) 59'; Savevski 82'	Report	Gütschow 10'; Maucksch (yellow card) 32'; Lieberam 63'; Sammer (yellow card) 72'; Minge 85'	Stadium: AEK Stadium; Attendance: 28,151; Referee: Emilio Soriano Aladrén (Spain)

==== Second round ====
18 October 1989 First leg	Marseille (France)	2–0	(Greece) AEK Athens	Marseille, France
21:30 EEST (UTC+3)	Papin 54'; Manolas 79' (o.g.)	Report		Stadium: Stade Vélodrome; Attendance: 24,263; Referee: Georges Sandoz (Switzerland)

1 November 1989 Second leg	AEK Athens (Greece)	1–1 (1–3 agg.)	(France) Marseille	Athens, Greece
21:00 EET (UTC+2)	Savevski 80' (pen.)	Report	Roche (yellow card) 51'; Förster (yellow card) 68'; Papin 85'	Stadium: AEK Stadium; Attendance: 33,260; Referee: Helmut Kohl (Austria)
Note: Due to incidents that took place by AEK ultras on the arrival of Marseille at AEK Stadium and for throwing smokers on the pitch at the entrance of AEK Athens, UEFA punished the club with a one-year ban from all European competitions.

== Statistics ==
=== Squad statistics ===
As of 2 June 1990

No.	Pos	Player	Alpha Ethniki		Greek Cup		Greek Super Cup		Greek League Cup		European Cup		Total	
No.	Pos	Player	Apps	Goals	Apps	Goals	Apps	Goals	Apps	Goals	Apps	Goals	Apps	Goals
Goalkeepers
—	GK	(Greece) Antonis Minou	26	0	4	0	0	0	0	0	0	0	30	0
—	GK	(Greece) Spyros Ikonomopoulos	8	0	1	0	1	0	1	0	4	0	15	0
—	GK	(Greece) Fanis Kofinas	0	0	1	0	0	0	4	0	0	0	5	0
Defenders
—	DF	(Greece) Makis Chatzis	10	0	3	0	0	0	0	0	3	0	16	0
—	DF	(Greece) Takis Karagiozopoulos	21	1	5	0	1	0	5	1	1	0	33	2
—	DF	(Greece) Stelios Manolas	33	3	4	0	1	0	4	0	4	1	46	4
—	DF	(Greece) Giorgos Peppes	21	0	4	1	0	0	2	0	3	0	30	1
—	DF	(Greece) Christos Vasilopoulos	29	1	4	0	1	0	1	0	3	0	38	1
—	DF	(Greece) Georgios Koutoulas	25	0	4	0	1	0	1	0	4	0	35	0
Midfielders
—	MF	(Poland) Mirosław Okoński	29	7	3	1	1	0	5	1	4	1	42	10
—	MF	(Greece) Pavlos Papaioannou	30	0	3	0	1	0	4	0	4	0	42	0
—	MF	(Cyprus) Giorgos Savvidis	34	7	5	1	1	0	4	3	4	2	48	13
—	MF	(Greece) Lampros Georgiadis	11	2	3	0	0	0	4	0	0	0	18	2
—	MF	(Socialist Federal Republic of Yugoslavia) Toni Savevski	34	5	4	0	1	0	3	2	4	2	46	9
—	MF	(Australia) Jim Patikas	29	11	2	3	1	0	3	1	4	0	39	15
—	MF	(Greece) Stavros Stamatis	24	0	6	1	1	0	1	0	1	0	33	1
—	MF	(Greece) Giorgos Famelis	11	2	4	0	0	0	4	1	0	0	19	3
—	MF	(Greece) Panagiotis Pangratis	3	1	3	0	0	0	3	0	0	0	9	1
—	MF	(Greece) Giorgos Papakostoulis	3	0	2	0	0	0	3	0	0	0	8	0
Forwards
—	FW	(Cape Verde) Daniel Batista	29	15	2	0	0	0	5	2	3	0	39	17
—	FW	(United States) Frank Klopas	0	0	3	0	0	0	0	0	0	0	3	0
—	FW	(Greece) Georgios Christodoulou	27	8	4	1	1	1	5	1	4	0	41	11
—	FW	(Greece) Spyros Goumas	0	0	0	0	0	0	1	0	0	0	1	0
Left during Winter Transfer window
—	FW	(Australia) Dimosthenis Batalis	0	0	4	1	0	0	0	0	2	0	6	1

=== Goalscorers ===
As of 2 June 1990
The list is sorted by competition order when total goals are equal, then by position and then alphabetically by surname.

Rank	Pos.	Player	Alpha Ethniki	Greek Cup	Greek Super Cup	Greek League Cup	European Cup	Total
1	FW	(Cape Verde) Daniel Batista	15	0	0	2	0	17
2	MF	(Australia) Jim Patikas	11	3	0	1	0	15
3	MF	(Cyprus) Giorgos Savvidis	7	1	0	3	2	13
4	FW	(Greece) Georgios Christodoulou	8	1	1	1	0	11
5	MF	(Poland) Mirosław Okoński	7	1	0	1	1	10
6	MF	(Socialist Federal Republic of Yugoslavia) Toni Savevski	5	0	0	2	2	9
7	DF	(Greece) Stelios Manolas	3	0	0	0	1	4
8	MF	(Greece) Giorgos Famelis	2	0	0	1	0	3
9	MF	(Greece) Lampros Georgiadis	2	0	0	0	0	2
9	DF	(Greece) Takis Karagiozopoulos	1	0	0	1	0	2
11	DF	(Greece) Christos Vasilopoulos	1	0	0	0	0	1
11	MF	(Greece) Panagiotis Pangratis	1	0	0	0	0	1
11	DF	(Greece) Giorgos Peppes	0	1	0	0	0	1
11	MF	(Greece) Stavros Stamatis	0	1	0	0	0	1
11	FW	(Australia) Dimosthenis Batalis	0	1	0	0	0	1
Own goals			1	0	0	0	0	1
Totals			64	9	1	12	6	92

=== Hat-tricks ===
Numbers in superscript represent the goals that the player scored.

Player	Against	Result	Date	Competition	Source
(Cape Verde) Daniel Batista^{4}	(Greece) Panionios	7–1 (H)	28 October 1989	Alpha Ethniki	
(Greece) Georgios Christodoulou	(Greece) Xanthi	8–0 (H)	10 December 1989	Alpha Ethniki	

=== Clean sheets ===
As of 2 June 1990
The list is sorted by competition order when total clean sheets are equal and then alphabetically by surname. Clean sheets in games where both goalkeepers participated are awarded to the goalkeeper who started the game. Goalkeepers with no appearances are not included.

Rank	Player	Alpha Ethniki	Greek Cup	Greek Super Cup	Greek League Cup	European Cup	Total
1	(Greece) Antonis Minou	18	2	0	0	0	20
2	(Greece) Spyros Ikonomopoulos	2	1	0	0	0	3
3	(Greece) Fanis Kofinas	0	0	0	2	0	2
Totals		20	3	0	2	0	25

=== Disciplinary record ===
As of 2 June 1990

N	P	Nat.	Name	Alpha Ethniki			Greek Cup			Greek Super Cup			Greek League Cup			European Cup			Total			Notes
N	P	Nat.	Name	Yellow card	Second yellow card	Red card	Yellow card	Second yellow card	Red card	Yellow card	Second yellow card	Red card	Yellow card	Second yellow card	Red card	Yellow card	Second yellow card	Red card	Yellow card	Second yellow card	Red card	Notes
Goalkeepers
—	GK	(Greece)	Antonis Minou	2															2			
—	GK	(Greece)	Spyros Ikonomopoulos																			
—	GK	(Greece)	Fanis Kofinas										1						1			
Defenders
—	DF	(Greece)	Makis Chatzis																			
—	DF	(Greece)	Takis Karagiozopoulos	3															3			
—	DF	(Greece)	Stelios Manolas	7	1														7	1		
—	DF	(Greece)	Giorgos Peppes	3		1													3		1	
—	DF	(Greece)	Christos Vasilopoulos	9												1			10			
—	DF	(Greece)	Georgios Koutoulas	1												1			2			
Midfielders
—	MF	(Poland)	Mirosław Okoński	2									1						3			
—	MF	(Greece)	Pavlos Papaioannou	3															3			
—	MF	(Cyprus)	Giorgos Savvidis	1												1			2			
—	MF	(Greece)	Lampros Georgiadis	2															2			
—	MF	(Socialist Federal Republic of Yugoslavia)	Toni Savevski	2												1			3			
—	MF	(Australia)	Jim Patikas	4						1						1			6			
—	MF	(Greece)	Stavros Stamatis	1						1								1	2		1	
—	MF	(Greece)	Giorgos Famelis	2															2			
—	MF	(Greece)	Panagiotis Pangratis																			
—	MF	(Greece)	Giorgos Papakostoulis																			
Forwards
—	FW	(Cape Verde)	Daniel Batista	3															3			
—	FW	(United States)	Frank Klopas																			
—	FW	(Greece)	Georgios Christodoulou	2															2			
—	FW	(Greece)	Spyros Goumas																			
Left during Winter Transfer window
—	FW	(Australia)	Dimosthenis Batalis																			

=== Starting 11 ===
This section presents the most frequently used formation along with the players with the most starts across all competitions.

N.	Formation	Matchday(s)
50	4–4–2	1–34

Nat.	Player	Pos.
(Greece)	Antonis Minou	GK
(Greece)	Stelios Manolas	RCB
(Greece)	Giorgos Peppes	LCB
(Greece)	Christos Vasilopoulos	RB
(Greece)	Georgios Koutoulas	LB
(Greece)	Pavlos Papaioannou (C)	DM
(Socialist Federal Republic of Yugoslavia)	Toni Savevski	CM
(Cyprus)	Giorgos Savvidis	RM
(Australia)	Jim Patikas	LM
(Poland)	Mirosław Okoński	SS
(Cape Verde)	Daniel Batista	CF

Last updated: 1990-06-02
