= Takis Karagiozopoulos =

Greek footballer

Personal information
- Full name: Dimitrios Karagiozopoulos
- Date of birth: 4 February 1961 (age 65)
- Place of birth: Meliki, Imathia, Greece
- Height: 1.83 m (6 ft 0 in)
- Positions: Center back; defensive midfielder; striker

Youth career
- –1978: Filippos Melikis

Senior career*
Years	Team	Apps	(Gls)
1978–1981	Veria		
1981–1993	AEK Athens	231	(19)
1993–1994	Apollon Athens	18	(0)
Total		249	(19)

International career
1978–1979	Greece U19		
1979–1987	Greece Mediterranean		
1983	Greece U21		
1984	Greece Olympic		

Managerial career
- 1998–2000: AEK Athens (assistant)
- 1998: AEK Athens (interim)
- 2000: AEK Athens (interim)
- 2000–2001: Veria
- 2002–2003: P.A.O. Rouf
- * Club domestic league appearances and goals

Dimitris "Takis" Karagiozopoulos (Greek: Τάκης Καραγκιοζόπουλος; born 4 February 1961) is a Greek former professional footballer who played as defender, mostly for AEK Athens. He is famous and beloved to AEK fans for his 12-year presence and for scoring the historic "golden" goal against Olympiacos on 7 May 1989, giving the Championship to AEK after 10 whole years.

== Club career ==
Karagiozopoulos started playing football for Filippos Melikis and in 1978 he was transferred to Veria, where he played in the position of striker. On 31 July 1981 he was transferred to AEK Athens, for a fee of 8 million dracmas.

In his first two seasons at the club he competed in the offense, until the manager, Zlatko Čajkovski converted him into the a defender, after the serious injury Petros Ravousis. Together with Stelios Manolas made an excellent defending duo. On 7 May 1989, AEK played one of the most important games in their history, in an away match against Olympiacos at the Olympic Stadium, for the penultimate game of the 1988–89 season. AEK had the opportunity with a victory or a draw to win the championship after 10 rough years. On the other hand, Olympiacos had a huge budget and although they only wanted a victory, were considered to be the favorite, since they were in excellent condition and played at home. Olympiacos entered the game dynamically, put a lot of pressure on AEK and lost several chances. As time passed, the pressure of the "red and whites" increased, but the goalpost of Ikonomopoulos stayed intact. At the 83rd minute, when AEK counterattacked Karagiozopoulos, who entered the game as a sub, combined 2 times with Okoński, starting from the area of AEK to the area of Olympiacos. Finally, he dribbled Alexiou, shoot with his left foot and sent the ball into the net and the fans of AEK in "heaven". This was one of the most important goals in the history of AEK as the 0–1 remained until the end and found the "yellow-blacks" champions. Never before has an AEK player been so closely associated with achieving a specific goal. Regardless of the rest of his career in the team, Karagiozopoulos is one of the most beloved players of all time to the friends of AEK, only thanks to that "golden" goal. He played with AEK for twelve years, winning three Championships a Cup, a Super Cup and a League Cup. He was a footballer who was distinguished for his intelligence, composure in his game, his very good technique for a defensive player, while he was also a specialist in penalty kicks. He never belonged to the "stars" of AEK, but he was a very useful "tool" for the team for twelve whole years, while he was at times one of its leaders. He had a total 231 appearances in league games with 19 goals, 47 cup games with six goals and 11 appearances in Europe.

On 9 July 1993 after the club did not proceed to renew his contract, he moved to Apollon Athens alongside his teammate Antonis Minou. He finished his career at the end of the season.

== International career ==
Karagiozopoulos played in the Greece's youth team in 1978. He played in the Greek mediterranean team in 1979, at Split and in 1987 in Latakia. In 1983 he played with U21 team against Denmark. He was also a member of the team that played in the 1984 pre-Olympic tournament.

== Managerial career ==
After the end of his career, Karagiozopoulos was initially involved in coaching and was on the bench of the AEK Athens, as an assistant coach for the two years. He even had to serve as the first head coach for some matches. In November 1998 after the dismissal of Dragoslav Stepanović and before the hiring of Oleg Blokhin, he was the coach of the team for three league matches, while he was also on the bench as the first coach in the tragic elimination from Poseidon Michaniona for the cup. In January 2000, he also replaced Ljubiša Tumbaković for a match, before Giannis Pathiakakis was hired.

Later Karagiozopoulos dealt with the science he has studied as a professor of physical education, while he deals with coaching only on an amateur level. The years after the end of his playing career until today, has a very active participation in the association of veteran football players of AEK.

== Stats ==
Season	Club	League		Cup		Europe		Total	
Season	Club	Apps	Goals	Apps	Goals	Apps	Goals	Apps	Goals
1981–82	AEK Athens	17	1	1	0	0	0	18	1
1982–83	AEK Athens	29	1	7	1	2	0	38	2
1983–84	AEK Athens	27	3	6	0	2	0	35	3
1984–85	AEK Athens	25	1	1	0	0	0	26	1
1985–86	AEK Athens	25	1	7	2	2	0	34	3
1986–87	AEK Athens	19	3	1	0	2	0	22	3
1987–88	AEK Athens	14	1	2	0	0	0	16	1
1988–89	AEK Athens	3	1	0	0	0	0	3	1
1989–90	AEK Athens	21	1	11	1	1	0	33	2
1990–91	AEK Athens	29	5	6	2	0	0	35	7
1991–92	AEK Athens	13	1	7	0	2	0	22	1
1992–93	AEK Athens	9	0	4	1	0	0	13	1
Career total		231	19	53	7	11	0	295	26

== Honours ==
AEK Athens

- Alpha Ethniki: 1988–89, 1991–92, 1992–93
- Greek Cup:1982–83
- Greek Super Cup: 1989
- Greek League Cup: 1990
