= Pavlos Papaioannou =

Greek-Brazilian footballer (born 1959)

Personal information
- Full name: Pavlos Papaioannou
- Date of birth: 19 March 1959 (age 67)
- Place of birth: São Paulo, Brazil
- Positions: Defensive midfielder; right back

Senior career*
Years	Team	Apps	(Gls)
1979–1983	Rodos	69	(1)
1983–1993	AEK Athens	255	(4)
1993–1994	Kalamata		
1994–1996	Aris Archangelos (player-manager)		
Total		324	(5)

International career
1985–1992	Greece	10	(0)
- * Club domestic league appearances and goals

Pavlos Papaioannou (Greek: Παύλος Παπαϊωάννου; born 19 March 1959) is a Greek-Brazilian former professional footballer.

== Club career ==
Papaioannou started his football career in 1979 at Rodos, where his performances, attracted the interest of major Greek clubs. On 9 July 1983, he was transferred to AEK Athens for 10 million drachmas.

Papaioannou was quickly established as a key member of the squad. He initially played as a right back, but was later established as a defensive midfielder. He stood out for his good physical condition, his continuous running and his contribution mainly in the blocking part, while also participating in the offensive. On 18 September 1985 he scored an important goal against Real Madrid in the 1–0 win for the UEFA Cup. His best period in the team was his last two years, when he was paired with Refik Šabanadžović in the midfield and was liberated increasing his performance. At AEK he won 3 Championships, 1 Super Cup and 1 League Cup, while he also served as their captain in several occasions.

In the summer of 1993 when the management decided not to renew his contract and on 13 July he signed for Kalamata, alongside his teammates Christos Vasilopoulos and Lampros Georgiadis. On the following season he returned to Rhodes to end his career in 1996, as a player-manager of the amateur club, Aris Archangelos. After the end of his playing career, Papaioannou enacted with coaching.

== International career ==
Papaioannou was eligible to play for Greece through his father and Brazil through his mother and place of birth. He was eventually capped 10 times by Greece. When he made his debut, he officially became the first Greek with a mixture of Brazilian descent to play for the Greece.

== Personal life ==
Papaioannou was born in Brazil, from a Greek father and a Brazilian mother. His daughter, Ramona is a 60m. sprinter, competing for AEK Athens. She is a Cyprus international.

== Career statistics ==
=== Club ===
Appearances and goals by club, season and competition
Club	Season	League			Greek Cup		Europe		Other (Note: Includes Greek Super Cup and Greek League Cup)		Total	
Club	Season	Division	Apps	Goals	Apps	Goals	Apps	Goals	Apps	Goals	Apps	Goals
Rodos	1979–80	Alpha Ethniki	16	0			0	0	0	0	16	0
Rodos	1980–81	Beta Ethniki					0	0	0	0	29	0
Rodos	1981–82	Alpha Ethniki	26	1			0	0	0	0	26	1
Rodos	1982–83	Alpha Ethniki	27	0			0	0	0	0	27	0
AEK Athens	1983–84	Alpha Ethniki	21	0	4	0	2	0	0	0	27	0
AEK Athens	1984–85	Alpha Ethniki	20	0	0	0	0	0	0	0	20	0
AEK Athens	1985–86	Alpha Ethniki	27	0	6	0	2	1	0	0	35	1
AEK Athens	1986–87	Alpha Ethniki	24	2	1	0	2	0	0	0	27	2
AEK Athens	1987–88	Alpha Ethniki	17	0	1	0	0	0	0	0	18	0
AEK Athens	1988–89	Alpha Ethniki	24	0	4	0	1	0	0	0	29	0
AEK Athens	1989–90	Alpha Ethniki	30	0	3	0	4	0	5	0	42	0
AEK Athens	1990–91	Alpha Ethniki	28	0	2	0	0	0	0	0	30	2
AEK Athens	1991–92	Alpha Ethniki	32	0	9	0	6	1	0	0	47	0
AEK Athens	1992–93	Alpha Ethniki	32	2	9	1	4	0	1	0	46	3
Kalamata	1993–94	Beta Ethniki					0	0	0	0	0	0
Career total			324	5	39	1	21	2	6	0	390	8

=== International ===
Appearances and goals by national team and year
National team	Year	Apps	Goals
Greece	1985	2	0
Greece	1986	0	0
Greece	1987	1	0
Greece	1988	0	0
Greece	1989	1	0
Greece	1990	0	0
Greece	1991	5	0
Greece	1992	1	0
Total		10	0

== Honours ==
AEK Athens

- Alpha Ethniki: 1988–89, 1991–92, 1992–93
- Greek Super Cup: 1989
- Greek League Cup: 1990
