= Spyros Dimopoulos =

Greek footballer

Personal information
- Date of birth: 2 March 1969 (age 57)
- Place of birth: Xylokera, Pyrgos, Elis, Greece
- Height: 1.78 m (5 ft 10 in)
- Position: Forward

Youth career
- 1983–1984: Aris Xylokeras
- 1984–1985: Ampelonas

Senior career*
Years	Team	Apps	(Gls)
1985–1987	Aias Gastouni		
1987–1988	Paniliakos		
1988–1989	Olympiacos Volos		
1989–1990	Iraklis		
1990–1991	PAS Korinthos		
1992	Ethnikos Piraeus		
1992–1994	PAS Korinthos		
1994–1995	Panargiakos		
1995–1996	Panegialios		
1996–1997	AO Pyrgos		
1997–1999	Thesprotos		
- * Club domestic league appearances and goals

Spyros Dimopoulos (Greek: Σπύρος Δημόπουλος, born 2 March 1969) is a retired Greek footballer who played as a forward. Spyros, alongside his brothers Thanasis Dimopoulos and Christos, holds the world record for the largest number of siblings scoring on the same day, on 2 February 1992 in the Greek first division. He is also one of the youngest player to score a hat-trick in Greek football. His nickname was "Foukos".

== Career ==
=== Early years ===
He started his career from local sixth-division club Aris Xylokeras at the age of 14, where his father Nikos was the chairman. He immediately impressed with his skills scoring 12 goals, becoming one of the youngest players in Greece to play first-team football. In the summer of 1984 he was signed by Ampelonas, another local club whose president was Thanasis Karagounis, father of Greece's legendary captain, Giorgos Karagounis. Dimopoulos scored 27 goals helping his team win promotion to the fifth tier. He was transferred to ambitious club Aias Gastouni in 1985, winning the Ileia county championship two years later and also promotion to Delta Ethniki.
In 1987 he signed for third-division club Paniliakos under coach Giannis Koronellos and also assistant Kostas Davourlis, Panachaiki's greatest ever player.

=== Later years ===
After a fruitful season and 14 goals with Paniliakos he was recommended to Greek powerhouse Panathinaikos where his brother Christos and Argentine midfielder Juan Ramón Rocha were playing. Panathinaikos did not sign the player but instead Rocha recommended him to his fellow countryman Gomez de Faria, Olympiakos Volos' coach at the time. Dimopoulos was not a regular for Olympiakos Volos, but he helped them win promotion to Alpha Ethniki in 1989. He was subsequently transferred to Iraklis Thessaloniki in the 1989-90 season, and he became teammate Vasilis Hatzipanagis, Greece's Golden player. His limited playing team with Iraklis prompted him to ask for a transfer. Dimopoulos returned to Beta Ethniki and signed for P.A.S. Korinthos in the summer of 1990, coached again by Gomez de Faria. He later played for first-division club Ethnikos Piraeus and also Panargiakos (coached by late Giannis Kyrastas, Panegialios, AO Pyrgos and Thesprotos. During his last year with Thesprotos he scored 30 goals and the team was promoted to Gamma Ethniki. Greece's coach Antonis Georgiadis had expressed his interest to call him up in 1989, but Dimopoulos eventually did not appear for the national team.
