= Giorgos Savvidis =

Cypriot footballer

Personal information
- Full name: Georgios Savvidis
- Date of birth: 8 February 1961 (age 65)
- Place of birth: Nicosia, Cyprus
- Positions: Right midfielder; attacking midfielder; forward

Youth career
- 1973–1979: Olympiakos Nicosia

Senior career*
Years	Team	Apps	(Gls)
1979–1981	Olympiakos Nicosia		
1981–1987	Omonia	190	(101)
1987–1992	AEK Athens	135	(33)
1992–1996	Omonia	93	(19)

International career
1982–1995	Cyprus	46	(2)

Managerial career
- 1999–2001: Digenis Akritas Morphou
- 2007–2008: Omonia
- * Club domestic league appearances and goals

Giorgos Savvidis (Greek: Γιώργος Σαββίδης; born 8 February 1961) is a former international Cypriot footballer who played as a right midfielder and a former football manager. During his playing days, he was regarded one of the best players in the country and was voted in the best 11 Cypriot national players of the past century.

== Club career ==
Savvidis took his first football steps in Olympiakos Nicosia. In 1981 he moved to Omonia, where he had a long career, winning 6 Championships, 2 Cups and 2 FA Shields.

On 14 July 1987 he made the big step of his career and moved to Greece to transfer to AEK Athens for a fee of approximately 20 million drachmas. There he was quickly established as a main player in the squad and on the following season he was appointed as the captain of the team. With AEK he won 2 Championships, a Greek Super Cup in 1989 and the Greek League Cup in 1990.

In the summer of 1992 after his contract was expired, Savvidis returned to Cyprus and Omonia, helping them win another Championship and another Cup title. After four seasons at the club he retired at the age of 35.

== Managerial career ==
He began his training career at Digenis Akritas Morphou winning the B league of Cyprus and achieved promotion for the club after almost 30 years. He left after a while to pursue a career along long-time friend Toni Savevski as his assistant manager. In the season 2001–02 he was the assistant coach for Apollon Limassol and between 2002 and 2004 assistant coach of Omonia Nicosia. In 2003, he won the Cypriot championship and the Cyprus Super Cup with Omonia. After the end of the 2004 season Savevski was sacked, causing Savvidis to leave as well. Savvidis agreed to return to Omonia after Dragan Okuka was sacked after failing to improve Omonia's performance. Omonia's fans were keen to see what effect this change was going to bring in the club's bewildering fortunes and had hoped that one of the club's long-time servants had what it takes to lift them to the top once again. However, Savvidis failed to change the club's performances and after only four months on the job quit, citing pressure from the Omonia fans.

== Honours ==
=== Player ===
Omonia

- Cypriot First Division: 1980–81, 1981–82, 1982–83, 1983–84, 1984–85, 1986–87, 1992–93
- Cypriot Cup: 1981–82, 1982–83, 1993–94
- Cyprus FA Shield: 1982, 1983

AEK Athens

- Alpha Ethniki: 1988–89, 1991–92
- Greek Super Cup: 1989
- Greek League Cup: 1990

=== Manager ===
Digenis Akritas Morphou

- Cypriot Second Division: 1999–2000

=== Individual ===
- Cypriot Championship top scorer: 1985
