= Stelios Manolas =

Greek footballer and manager (born 1961)

Personal information
- Full name: Stylianos Manolas
- Date of birth: 13 July 1961 (age 65)
- Place of birth: Naxos, Greece
- Height: 1.90 m (6 ft 3 in)
- Position: Center back

Youth career
- 1976: Aetos Galatsi
- 1976–1980: AEK Athens

Senior career*
Years	Team	Apps	(Gls)
1980–1998	AEK Athens	447	(35)
Total		447	(35)

International career
–1981	Greece U19		
1982–1995	Greece	71	(6)

Managerial career
- 2002–2004: Greece U21
- 2012–2013: Niki Volos
- 2014–2016: AEK Athens U20
- 2015: AEK Athens (interim)
- 2016: AEK Athens (interim)
- * Club domestic league appearances and goals

Stelios Manolas (Greek: Στέλιος Μανωλάς, born 13 July 1961) is a Greek former professional footballer who played as a centre-back for AEK Athens and a current manager. Widely regarded as the best Greek defender of his era, he is one of the few Greek footballers to have played his entire professional career for a single club. In 2021, the IFFHS chose him in Greece's best XI of all time.

== Club career ==
Manolas started football from a young age, playing on the streets and vacant lots in and around the suburb of Galatsi, where he lived during his childhood. In his early teens he played for a local amateur club, Aetos Galatsi alongside his friend, Kostas Antoniou. During that period he was discovered by scouts and was brought to the attention of AEK Athens. In 1976 he joined the academies of the club. Over time, he was distinguished for his technical skill, intelligence and tactical mind. On 2 January 1980, he signed his first professional contract and was promoted to the men's team. He made his debut shortly after on 3 February 1980 in a 1–1 draw against Kastoria and from the next season onwards, he became a regular in the team's defense.

As a youngster, he presented solid technical training, dynamism, perception and a fighting spirit. He was a mastermind of the defense, influenced his teammates and boosted their confidence. Even though he was started his career as a right back, he was converted into a centre-back by Hans Tilkowski, a position where he was established for the rest of his career. On 29 June 1983 he played in the final of the Greek Cup, where they won 2–0 against PAOK and lifted the trophy. He didn't take him long to become amongst the best players of the team and one their natural leaders. In the summer of 1988 despite his desire to depart from AEK, the new president, Stratos Gidopoulos alongside the new manager Dušan Bajević persuaded him to stay and renew his contract, which he did on 8 July. On 7 May 1989 in the crucial game against Olympiacos at the Olympic Stadium, he made a save with his head on the goal line after a shot by Lajos Détári, that brought AEK their first Championship after 10 years. In the following season AEK went to win the Super Cup and the League Cup.

Under Bajević, AEK Athens went into a title-winning era. Manolas alongside Toni Savevski, became the main players that the team was based during the 90's, while he also served as their captain. On 19 November 1993 he renewed his contract for another 1,5 years. Manolas was targeted by Porto and Monaco, but as he stated, he didn't intend in leaving the club, as his desire was to retire there. In the summer of 1994, after the conquest of three consecutive Championships, he led the club in reaching the group stage of the UEFA Champions League, becoming the first Greek club to qualify in the new format. On 6 July 1995 he renewed his contract for another year. AEK went to win the Cup at the end of the season, while they lost the league to a margin by Panathinaikos. Despite the departure of Bajević in the following summer, Manolas stayed at the club and renewed his contract for another year on 18 July 1996. Under the new manager and his former teammate, Petros Ravousis, they won the Super Cup and another Cup at the end of the season.

In the summer of 1997 Manolas, dissatisfied with the owner Michalis Trochanas, withdrew from the club's activities, until ENIC became the major shareholder of the club. The former player Lakis Nikolaou was appointed as the club's president and persuaded Manolas to return and end his career at the end of the season. His last match was against Skoda Xanthi which earned him his 700th appearance. Manolas ended his career after 19 seasons, being second in league appearances behind Mimis Papaioannou and 12th in the history of the tournaments. With AEK, he won in total 4 Championships, 3 Cups, 2 Super Cups and the League Cup in 1990.

== International career ==
Manolas played for Greece in 71 matches from 1982 to 1994 and scored 6 goals. He was a member of the squad that played in the 1994 FIFA World Cup, in the USA.

== Managerial career ==
After his retirement, Manolas became a certified manager in 2002 and worked at the bench of Greece U21 until 2004. In 2008 he held the post of technical director in AEK, where he resigned in 2009. In November 2012 he became the manager of Niki Volos where he stayed for three months. In the summer of 2014 he returned to AEK, as the manager of AEK Athens U20. In 2015, he was called from AEK as an interim manager to replace Traianos Dellas in the senior team and was then called again at the same position to replace Gus Poyet. During his second managerial period, he won the Cup in 2016. He returned in his position as the manager of the youth team until 13 October 2016, when he quit.

== Personal life ==
Manolas is the uncle of former AEK Athens and Olympiacos international defender, Kostas. His son, Konstantinos, was also a footballer who played for AEK.

== Career statistics ==
=== Club ===
Appearances and goals by club, season and competition
Club	Season	League			Greek Cup		Europe		Balkans Cup		Other (Note: Includes Greek Super Cup and Greek League Cup)		Total	
Club	Season	Division	Apps	Goals	Apps	Goals	Apps	Goals	Apps	Goals	Apps	Goals	Apps	Goals
AEK Athens	1979–80	Alpha Ethniki	3	0	0	0	0	0	0	0	0	0	3	0
AEK Athens	1980–81	Alpha Ethniki	23	1	5	0	0	0	4	0	0	0	32	1
AEK Athens	1981–82	Alpha Ethniki	32	0	2	0	0	0	0	0	0	0	34	0
AEK Athens	1982–83	Alpha Ethniki	29	1	8	0	1	0	0	0	0	0	38	1
AEK Athens	1983–84	Alpha Ethniki	27	1	5	0	2	0	0	0	0	0	34	1
AEK Athens	1984–85	Alpha Ethniki	25	0	1	0	0	0	0	0	0	0	26	0
AEK Athens	1985–86	Alpha Ethniki	20	3	7	1	2	0	0	0	0	0	29	4
AEK Athens	1986–87	Alpha Ethniki	20	1	1	0	2	0	0	0	0	0	23	1
AEK Athens	1987–88	Alpha Ethniki	21	4	4	0	0	0	0	0	0	0	25	4
AEK Athens	1988–89	Alpha Ethniki	24	4	4	1	2	0	0	0	0	0	30	5
AEK Athens	1989–90	Alpha Ethniki	33	3	4	0	4	1	0	0	5	0	46	4
AEK Athens	1990–91	Alpha Ethniki	24	4	3	1	0	0	0	0	0	0	27	5
AEK Athens	1991–92	Alpha Ethniki	31	4	12	3	4	0	0	0	0	0	47	7
AEK Athens	1992–93	Alpha Ethniki	30	1	7	0	3	0	0	0	1	0	41	1
AEK Athens	1993–94	Alpha Ethniki	24	2	8	1	1	0	0	0	1	0	34	3
AEK Athens	1994–95	Alpha Ethniki	23	1	10	2	6	0	0	0	0	0	39	3
AEK Athens	1995–96	Alpha Ethniki	22	3	9	0	3	0	0	0	0	0	34	3
AEK Athens	1996–97	Alpha Ethniki	23	2	6	2	6	0	0	0	1	0	36	4
AEK Athens	1997–98	Alpha Ethniki	13	0	0	0	2	0	0	0	0	0	15	0
Career total			447	35	96	11	38	1	4	0	8	0	593	47

=== International ===
Appearances and goals by national team and year
National team	Year	Apps	Goals
Greece	1982	1	0
Greece	1983	1	0
Greece	1984	7	1
Greece	1985	5	0
Greece	1986	8	0
Greece	1987	7	0
Greece	1988	6	2
Greece	1989	7	0
Greece	1990	8	2
Greece	1991	4	1
Greece	1992	5	0
Greece	1993	6	0
Greece	1994	6	0
Total		71	6

Last updated: 2022-07-15
Source: Stelios Manolas at National-Football-Teams.com

Scores and results list Greece's goal tally first, score column indicates score after each Manolas goal.

List of international goals scored by Stelios Manolas
No.	Date	Venue	Opponent	Score	Result	Competition
1	9 October 1984	Athens Olympic Stadium, Athens, Greece	Israel	2–2	2–2	Friendly
2	17 February 1988	Athens Olympic Stadium, Athens, Greece	Northern Ireland	1–1	3–2	Friendly
3	17 February 1988	Athens Olympic Stadium, Athens, Greece	Northern Ireland	2–2	3–2	Friendly
4	28 March 1990	Athens Olympic Stadium, Athens, Greece	Israel	1–0	2–1	Friendly
5	28 March 1990	Athens Olympic Stadium, Athens, Greece	Israel	2–1	2–1	Friendly
6	23 January 1991	Athens Olympic Stadium, Athens, Greece	Portugal	2–2	3–2	UEFA Euro 1992 qualifying

== Managerial statistics ==
As of match played 17 May 2016

Managerial record by team and tenure
Team	From	To	Record								PPM	Ref.
Team	From	To	G	W	D	L	GF	GA	GD	Win %	PPM	Ref.
Greece U21	1 July 2002	30 June 2004	17	5	6	6	20	18	+2	29.41	1.24	
(Greece) Niki Volos	6 November 2012	17 February 2013	16	6	7	3	16	9	+7	37.50	1.56	
(Greece) AEK Athens U20	1 July 2014	13 October 2016	34	18	4	12	58	38	+20	52.94	1.71	
(Greece) AEK Athens (interim)	20 October 2015	30 October 2015	2	2	0	0	6	1	+5	100.00	3.00	
(Greece) AEK Athens (interim)	20 April 2016	19 May 2016	4	2	1	1	5	4	+1	50.00	1.75	
Total			73	33	18	22	105	70	+35	45.21		

== Honours ==
=== As a player ===
AEK Athens

- Alpha Ethniki: 1988–89, 1991–92, 1992–93, 1993–94
- Greek Cup: 1982–83, 1995–96, 1996–97
- Greek Super Cup: 1989, 1996
- Greek League Cup: 1990

=== As a manager ===
AEK Athens

- Greek Cup: 2015–16

== See also ==
- List of one-club men in association football
