= Antonis Minou =

Greek footballer (born 1958)

Personal information
- Full name: Antonios Minou
- Date of birth: 4 May 1958 (age 68)
- Place of birth: Aridaia, Greece
- Height: 1.92 m (6 ft 4 in)
- Position: Goalkeeper

Youth career
- 1979–1980: Almopos Aridea

Senior career*
Years	Team	Apps	(Gls)
1980–1982	Kastoria	51	(0)
1982–1988	Panathinaikos	73	(0)
1988–1993	AEK Athens	125	(0)
1993–1996	Apollon Athens	79	(0)
Total		328	(0)

International career
1984	Greece Olympic	1	(0)
1986–1994	Greece	16	(0)

Managerial career
- 1998: AEK Athens (interim)
- * Club domestic league appearances and goals

Antonis Minou (Greek: Αντώνης Μήνου; born 4 May 1958) is a Greek former professional footballer who played as a goalkeeper.

== Club career ==
Minou began his career with Almopos Aridea, signing for Kastoria in 1980, and two years later, he moved to Panathinaikos, where he became known to the general public and was called to the national team. At Panathinaikos, he won two Championships and three Cups. However, the difficult competition for a first-team place with Nikos Sarganis forced him to look for another club.

On 13 July 1988 Minou was transferred to AEK Athens for a fee of 50 million drachmas. In his first season with AEK, he was a second choice behind Spyros Ikonomopoulos, but from the following season he became a regular and never lost his place, until the end of his spell at AEK. The decision by the club's management to release him in the summer of 1993 was said to be surprising, since he was the first-choice goalkeeper in his last two seasons in which the team won the league, while also playing in the national team. With AEK he won three Championships, one Greek Super Cup and one Greek League Cup.

In the summer of 1993 his contract with AEK expired and on 9 July Minou joined Apollon Athens alongside his teammate, Takis Karagiozopoulos. There he played for three seasons before ending his career at a footballer at the age of 38.

== International career ==
Minou played in a total of 16 matches with Greece. He played for the first time on 8 October 1986, in an away friendly match against Italy, when under the instructions of Miltos Papapostolou, he replaced Theologis Papadopoulos in the second half. He was part of the squad that traveled to the USA for the 1994 FIFA World Cup, where he played in the opening match against Argentina. He also competed with the Olympic team in 1983.

== Managerial career ==
After the end of his career he became involved in coaching, in the period 1997–98, he was initially the assistant manager of Dumitru Dumitriu at AEK Athens and after the later was sacked, he his replacement until the end of the season. Later he became assistant of Fernando Santos at AEK and later in Greece.

== Honours ==
Panathinaikos

- Alpha Ethniki: 1983–84, 1985–86
- Greek Cup: 1983–84, 1985–86, 1987–88

AEK Athens

- Alpha Ethniki: 1988–89, 1991–92, 1992–93
- Greek Super Cup: 1989
- Greek League Cup: 1990
