= Spyros Ikonomopoulos =

Greek footballer

Personal information
- Full name: Spyridon Ikonomopoulos
- Date of birth: 26 October 1959 (age 67)
- Place of birth: Akrata, Achaea, Greece
- Height: 1.87 m (6 ft 2 in)
- Position: Goalkeeper

Youth career
- –1977: AO Akratas
- 1977–1979: AEK Athens

Senior career*
Years	Team	Apps	(Gls)
1977–1996	AEK Athens	95	(0)
Total		95	(0)

International career
1984–1989	Greece	12	(0)
- * Club domestic league appearances and goals

Spyros Ikonomopoulos (Greek: Σπύρος Οικονομόπουλος; born 26 October 1959) is a Greek former professional Goalkeeper footballer who played as a goalkeeper for AEK Athens. He was voted Best Greek Player of the Season in 1989.

== Club career ==
Ikonomopoulos started his football career from the amateur club of his hometown, AO Akratas. On 29 July 1977, the 18-year-old, goalkeaper was signed by the youth team of AEK Athens. He made his debut with the senior team on 26 December 1977, against Ethnikos Piraeus at home, in a match where the professional footballers went on a strike which resulted in the clubs fielding with amateur footballers.

In 1979 Ikonomopoulos was eventually promoted to the senior team. During his first seasons at the club, he had the "misfortune" to coexist with great goalkeepers, such as Nikos Christidis, Lakis Stergioudas, Christos Arvanitis and Theologis Papadopoulos, so the competition for the spot was particularly tough. Thus, he spent his first years mainly as a back up choice. However, in 1988, under Dušan Bajević, Ikonomopoulos became the main goalkeeper and played in all of the matches of the season. During that season, he saved three penalties and effectively gave AEK their first league title in 10 years. At that time he was gived the nickname "Mr. Championship 1989" by the club's supporters. On 30 August 1989, he played at the 1989 Greek Super Cup, where AEK won against Panathinaikos by 6–5 on penalty shoot-out. However, in the start of the following season, he made some unfortunate performances that led to his gradual decommissioning, which resulted in him losing his position under the posts by Antonis Minou. In the summer of 1992, with the arrival of Ilias Atmatsidis, his career at AEK was essentially over. He made his last appearance with the yellow-blacks on 29 December 1993 in a Cup match against Asteras Ambelokipoi. He remained part as a part of the squad without making a single appearance, winning three consecutive championships and the Cup in 1996. In the summer of 1996 he officially retired, at the age of 37.

== International career ==
Ikonomopoulos played a total of 12 times with Greece, between 1984 and 1989. His debut took place on 12 September 1984 in an away friendly against East Germany, when under Miltos Papapostolou, the manager who had also established him at AEK, replaced Georgios Plitsis at half-time.

== After football ==
After the end of his football career, he returned to Akrata, where he developed a business activity. At some point, the administration of AEK announced their decision to hold a friendly match in his honor, but it was never materialized.

== Career statistics ==
=== Club ===
Appearances and goals by club, season and competition
Club	Season	League			Greek Cup		Europe		Balkans Cup		Other (Note: Includes Greek Super Cup and Greek League Cup)		Total	
Club	Season	Division	Apps	Goals	Apps	Goals	Apps	Goals	Apps	Goals	Apps	Goals	Apps	Goals
AEK Athens	1977–78	Alpha Ethniki	1	0	0	0	0	0	0	0	0	0	1	0
AEK Athens	1978–79	Alpha Ethniki	0	0	0	0	0	0	0	0	0	0	0	0
AEK Athens	1979–80	Alpha Ethniki	8	0	0	0	0	0	0	0	0	0	8	0
AEK Athens	1980–81	Alpha Ethniki	26	0	6	0	0	0	1	0	0	0	33	0
AEK Athens	1981–82	Alpha Ethniki	12	0	1	0	0	0	0	0	0	0	13	0
AEK Athens	1982–83	Alpha Ethniki	1	0	0	0	0	0	0	0	0	0	1	0
AEK Athens	1983–84	Alpha Ethniki	0	0	0	0	0	0	0	0	0	0	0	0
AEK Athens	1984–85	Alpha Ethniki	2	0	0	0	0	0	0	0	0	0	2	0
AEK Athens	1985–86	Alpha Ethniki	1	0	2	0	0	0	0	0	0	0	3	0
AEK Athens	1986–87	Alpha Ethniki	0	0	0	0	0	0	0	0	0	0	0	0
AEK Athens	1987–88	Alpha Ethniki	4	0	0	0	0	0	0	0	0	0	4	0
AEK Athens	1988–89	Alpha Ethniki	30	0	4	0	2	0	0	0	0	0	36	0
AEK Athens	1989–90	Alpha Ethniki	8	0	1	0	4	0	0	0	2	0	15	0
AEK Athens	1990–91	Alpha Ethniki	2	0	1	0	0	0	0	0	0	0	3	0
AEK Athens	1991–92	Alpha Ethniki	0	0	0	0	0	0	0	0	0	0	0	0
AEK Athens	1992–93	Alpha Ethniki	0	0	0	0	0	0	0	0	0	0	0	0
AEK Athens	1993–94	Alpha Ethniki	0	0	2	0	0	0	0	0	0	0	2	0
AEK Athens	1994–95	Alpha Ethniki	0	0	0	0	0	0	0	0	0	0	0	0
AEK Athens	1995–96	Alpha Ethniki	0	0	0	0	0	0	0	0	0	0	0	0
Career total			95	0	17	0	6	0	1	0	2	0	121	0

=== International ===
Appearances and goals by national team and year
National team	Year	Apps	Goals
Greece	1984	1	0
Greece	1985	0	0
Greece	1986	0	0
Greece	1987	0	0
Greece	1988	1	0
Greece	1989	10	0
Total		12	0

== Honours ==
AEK Athens

- Alpha Ethniki: 1977–78, 1978–79, 1988–89, 1991–92, 1992–93, 1993–94
- Greek Cup: 1982–83, 1995–96
- Greek Super Cup: 1989
- Greek League Cup: 1990

Individual

- Best Greek Player of the Season: 1988–89

== See also ==
- List of one-club men in association football
