= Stavros Stamatis =

Greek footballer (born 1966)

Personal information
- Full name: Stavros Stamatis
- Date of birth: 13 January 1966 (age 60)
- Place of birth: Athens, Greece
- Positions: Midfielder; defender

Youth career
- 1980–1984: Ilioupoli

Senior career*
Years	Team	Apps	(Gls)
1984–1986	Ilioupoli		
1986–1988	Charavgiakos		
1988–1995	AEK Athens	122	(8)
1995–1998	Ionikos		
1998–1999	Panelefsiniakos		
1999–2000	Atromitos		

International career
1989–1990	Greece	5	(0)
- * Club domestic league appearances and goals

Stavros Stamatis (Greek: Σταύρος Σταματής; born 13 January 1966) is a Greek former professional footballer who played as midfielder.

== Club career ==
Stamatis started his football career in 1980 at Ilioupoli. In 1986 he signed for the second division side, Charavgiakos. His performances earned him a transfer to AEK Athens on 14 December 1988 for a fee of 22 million drachmas.

Stamatis played mainly as an attacking midfielder when signed for AEK, but he eventually became a versatile footballer who played in all positions of the midfield and the defense, but established himself mainly as a defensive midfielder. A player with good technique and passing, with the ability to "stick" the ball in his feet and carry it over long distances on the pitch, but not without his defensive capabilities. A useful tool under Dušan Bajević, often contributed as the "12th player" of the team. His lack of speed was his main playing disadvantage.

On 7 May 1989, he had a good performance in the historic 0–1 away win against Olympiacos, which gave AEK the title. His greatest appearance was at 21 October 1992, in the victory against Eindhoven with 1–0 for the European Cup, where he was very effective as a sweeper. On 1 April 1995, he scored his last goal for AEK in the derby against Olympiacos to form the final 2–2 at home. Stamatis played at AEK for 7 years, where he won 4 league titles, 1 Greek Super Cup and 1 Greek League Cup.

In December 1995 he left and moved to Ionikos, where he played for 3 seasons. Afterwards, he signed for Panelefsiniakos and Atromitos for one season each, before retiring in 2000.

== International career ==
Stamatis made 5 appearances with Greece between 1989 and 1990.

== After football ==
After the end of his career, Stamatis maintains his own cafeteria business in Athens.

== Personal life ==
His son, Andreas also played for AEK Athens for the 2012–13 season. In fact the two of them are the only father-son "duo" who have both scored for AEK.

== Honours ==
AEK Athens

- Alpha Ethniki: 1988–89, 1991–92, 1992–93, 1993–94
- Greek Super Cup: 1989
- Greek League Cup: 1990
