= Georgios Christodoulou (footballer, born 1967) =

Greek footballer (born 1967)

Giorgos Christodoulou
Personal information
- Full name: Georgios Christodoulou
- Date of birth: 20 May 1967 (age 59)
- Place of birth: Athens, Greece
- Height: 1.79 m (5 ft 10 in)
- Position: Forward

Youth career
- –1985: Akratitos

Senior career*
Years	Team	Apps	(Gls)
1985–1993	AEK Athens	72	(11)
1987–1988	→ Acharnaikos (loan)		
1991–1993	→ Pezoporikos (loan)		
1994	Proodeftiki		
- * Club domestic league appearances and goals

Georgios Christodoulou (Greek: Γεώργιος Χριστοδούλου; born 20 May 1967) is a Greek former professional footballer who played as forward.

== Club career ==
Christodoulou started his football career at Akratitos. On 11 July 1985 Christodoulou was transferred to AEK Athens.

The manager, Jacek Gmoch included him in the team's preparation in Sweden, where he used him in 6 games. In the following season, he wasn't in the plans of the manager, Todor Veselinović, and played in 2 league matches. On 15 December 1987 he was loaned to Acharnaikos. Upon his return to AEK in the summer of 1988, the team's manager, Dušan Bajević to put faith in him and gave him plenty of chances throughout the season. The young striker took advantage of those chances and helped the team either as a starter or as a substitute, in winning the Championship after 10 years. In fact, his goal at Toumba Stadium against PAOK was one of the most decisive of the season. The following year he also had a very good presence and despite the transfer of Daniel Batista to the club, Bajević distributed playing time to all the strikers he used. On 30 August 1989, he equalized the score in the Super Cup against Panathinaikos, where the match was sent to penalties, which led in AEK winning the title. In the home match against Marseille for the European Cup, Christodoulou won the penalty with which Toni Savevski converted into a goal. In the 8–0 triumph at home over Xanthi, he scored a hat-trick, including a goal with a heel. Afterwards the problems began. He was gradually losing his place in the team, while it was rumored that he had serious problems with his off-field life. During his spell at AEK he won the Championship in 1989, the Greek Super Cup in 1989 and the Greek League Cup in 1990.

On 23 August 1991 he was loaned to Pezoporikos. He continued his career Proodeftiki, not being able to return in his previous form.

== After football ==
After the end of his career, Christodoulou stayed away from football. He occupied a portion of the media over some issues he had with justice, but he returned to his normal living with his family in Ano Liosia.

== Honours ==
AEK Athens

- Alpha Ethniki: 1988–89
- Greek Super Cup: 1989
- Greek League Cup: 1990
