= Giorgos Papakostoulis =

Greek footballer

Personal information
- Full name: Georgios Papakostoulis
- Date of birth: 2 October 1971 (age 55)
- Place of birth: Larissa, Greece
- Height: 1.80 m (5 ft 11 in)
- Position: Midfielder

Team information
- Current team: A.E. Kifisia (women) (manager)

Youth career
- –1988: Atromitos Agioi Anargyroi

Senior career*
Years	Team	Apps	(Gls)
1988–1991	AEK Athens	10	(0)
1991–1994	Atromitos		
1994–1996	Acharnaikos		
1996–1998	Aris Petroupolis		
1999	Ethnikos Piraeus		
2000–2005	Aspropyrgos		
2005–2007	Kipoupoli		

International career
1990	Greece U19		

Managerial career
- 2009–2011: Kentavros Vrilissia
- 2011–2013: AEK Athens U15
- 2013–2014: Triglia Rafinas
- 2014–2018: Olympiacos U15
- 2018–2020: A.O.T. Alimos
- 2022–2023: Saronikos Anavyssos
- 2023: Acharnaikos
- 2023–2024: Aris Voula
- 2024–2025: Triglia Rafinas
- 2025: Acharnaikos (women)
- 2026–: A.E. Kifisia (women)
- * Club domestic league appearances and goals

Giorgos Papakostoulis (Greek: Γιώργος Παπακωστούλης; born 2 October 1971) is a Greek former professional footballer who played as midfielder.

== Club career ==
Papakostoulis started playing football at Atromitos Agioi Anargyroi. In the summer of 1988 he was transferred to AEK Athens. There, he did not manage to make many appearances, since while he was playing football he also studied at the School of Physical Education and Sport Science of National and Kapodistrian University of Athens and was released in 1991. During his spell at AEK he won the Championship in 1989, the Greek Super Cup in 1989 and the Greek League Cup in 1990.

After he left the yellow-blacks, he joined the second division side, Atromitos, where he played until 1994. His next team was the third division side, Acharnaikos, where he spent 2 seasons. In the summer of 1996 he joined Aris Petroupolis for another 2 seasons, playing in the fourth division. In 1999 he had a brief stint at Ethnikos Piraeus. In 2000 he was transferred to Aspropyrgos, that competed in the amateur championship of Piraeus, where he remained until 2005. Afterwards, he competed in Kipoupoli where he stopped playing football in 2007.

== International career ==
Papakostoulis was a member of the squad of Greece U19 that played in the qualifiers of the 1990 UEFA European Under-18 Championship.

== Managerial career ==
After the end of his football career, Papakostoulis worked at Kentavros Vrilissia for four years, being in charge of the football academy, but for two years he also took over the technical leadership of the first team. He then coached AEK Athens U15 until 2013, where he was released and took over Triglia Rafinas in the third division with which he achieved fourth place. In 2014 he joined Olympiacos U15 from where he left in 2018. Afterwards, he took over as the manager of A.O.T. Alimos until 2020. In 2022 he was hired by Saronikos Anavyssos, where he stayed for a season. In the summer 2023 he took over Acharnaikos and resigned two months later and was hired by Aris Voula, where he stayed for a year, before returning to Triglia Rafinas. There he stayed until 2025 and from that point on he became the manager of the women department of Acharnaikos.

== Honours ==
AEK Athens

- Alpha Ethniki: 1988–89
- Greek Super Cup: 1989
- Greek League Cup: 1990
