= Jim Patikas =

Australian footballer and manager

Personal information
- Full name: Dimitrios Patikas
- Date of birth: 18 October 1963 (age 63)
- Place of birth: Sydney, Australia
- Height: 1.76 m (5 ft 9 in)
- Positions: Wide midfielder; forward

Senior career*
Years	Team	Apps	(Gls)
1979–1983	Sydney City	59	(10)
1981	Aberdeen		
1983–1984	Sydney Olympic	57	(13)
1985	Sydney Croatia	25	(17)
1985–1992	AEK Athens	142	(27)
1992–1993	Athinaikos	10	(1)
1993	A.P.I.A. Leichhardt Tigers	1	(0)
1993–1994	Athinaikos	35	(2)
1994–1995	Kastoria		
1996	Sydney United	17	(1)
1996–1997	Sydney Olympic	1	(0)
Total		329	(71)

International career
1981–1983	Australia U20	30	(4)
1981–1988	Australia	10	(2)
1984–1985	Australia B	9	(0)

Managerial career
- 2024–2025: Inner West Hawks
- 2026–: Marrickville FC
- * Club domestic league appearances and goals

Jim Patikas (Greek: Τζίμης Πατίκας; born 18 October 1963) is an Australian former international football player and the manager of Marrickville FC. Renowned for his exceptional speed and for being the first established Australian player to be signed by a professional overseas football club. He represented Australia 27 times, and played as a forward and midfielder for Sydney City, Sydney Olympic, Sydney Croatia, AEK Athens, Athinaikos and Kastoria. Since retiring as a player, Patikas has coached at all levels across outdoor & futsal in both male & female football.

He is currently head coach of Marrickville FC. He previously had been the manager of Inner West Hawks.

== Club career ==
Patikas began playing professional football with NSL Champions Sydney City, debuting as a 15-year-old in the 1979 season.

In 1983, after five seasons and three NSL Championships with Sydney City, Patikas was signed by Tommy Docherty at Sydney Olympic. In his first season at Olympic, he won the NSL Cup and was the top scorer of the cup competition. The performances of Patikas, particularly in international youth tournaments, attracted the attention of many scouts. One including the newly appointed manager of Barcelona, Cesar Luis Menotti. According to media reports, Patikas was offered a contract by Menotti, but an injury forced him to return to Australia.

In 1985, Patikas joined Olympics' rivals Sydney Croatia and scored two goals against his former club on his way to the Player of the Year and top goal scorer titles. He made 13 representative appearances for Australia during this season; whilst also leading NSW to a 3-1 win over Queensland in the interstate soccer fixture. Patikas starred by scoring two goals, with John Kosmina adding the other for NSW, and Dave Wheeler scoring for Queensland.

On 12 December 1985 Patikas was transferred to the Greek club, AEK Athens for a fee of 5 milion drachmas. In his fourth season at the yellow-blacks, under Dušan Bajević he won the league title ending the club's ten-year championship drought. He went on to make 254 appearances for AEK in all competitions (including European Cup / UEFA Champions League and UEFA Cup) scoring 71 goals. During his seven seasons at AEK Athens, Patikas won 3 Greek Championships, 1 Greek League Cup, 1 Greek Super Cup.

On 11 December 1992 he was released from the club and signed for Athinaikos. On 21 February 1993 Patikas scored in an away 2–2 draw against Olympiacos which helped AEK win a second league title in a row. On 3 October 1993 he played against his former club at Nikos Goumas Stadium and scored the last goal that shaped the final 3–2 defeat for Athinaikos.

In 1995, Patikas signed for Northern Greek outfit Kastoria in third division. The club was promoted into second division where he finished as joint top scorer with 9 goals in 15 games. Kastoria went on to win promotion to the first division for the first time since 1983. Following a successful period at Kastoria, Patikas returned to his homeland to play for Sydney United and Sydney Olympic in the NSL.

== International career ==
Patikas represented Australia U20 in both the 1981 FIFA World Youth Championship in Sydney and 1983 FIFA World Youth Championship in Mexico, being one of the youngest players in the 1981 FIFA World Youth Championship. He was a key part of the Australian squad that reached the quarter-finals in 1981, losing 1–0 only to eventual winners, Germany. He held the record for most Australia international youth appearances after playing in his second FIFA World Youth Championship in Mexico. Against European Youth Champions Scotland, Patikas scored a goal with 3 minutes remaining to give Australia a 2-1 victory elevating them to the top of Group A. In the final round, a 2–1 defeat to Korea Republic resulted in the elimination of Australia from the tournament with only one defeat.

His performances for the youth team and Sydney City earned Patikas his first senior international appearance with Australia aged only 17 against Indonesia in the qualifying round of the 1982 FIFA World Cup and a contract with Sir Alex Ferguson coached Aberdeen. He was also a key member of Australia that played in the 1986 FIFA World Cup Qualifying matches against Scotland of Gordon Strachan, Alex McLeish and Graeme Souness. Patikas who had experience in Scotland during his time at Aberdeen was one of the stand-out performers for Australia in a 2–0 aggregate loss. In March 1988, Patikas represented Australia in the Summer Olympics qualifiers becoming the first player to turn out for Australia, while based at a non-Australian club. In his first game back he scored the winner for Australia against Chinese Taipei. The next match against New Zealand saw Patikas become the first Australian goal scorer at the Sydney Football Stadium when opening the scoring in a 3–1 win.

== Honours ==
=== Player ===
Sydney City

- NSL Championship: 1980, 1981, 1982

Sydney Olympic

- NSL Cup: 1983

New South Wales

- Interstate winner: 1985

AEK Athens

- Alpha Ethniki: 1988–89, 1991–92, 1992–93
- Greek Super Cup: 1989
- Greek League Cup: 1990

=== Individual ===
- Australian Player of the Year: 1985 (Sydney Croatia)
- Top goal scorer: 1985 (Sydney Croatia)
- NSW Player of the Year: 1985 (Sydney Croatia)
- Greek League MVP Team: 1986–87, 1989–90 (AEK Athens)
- First player to represent Australia while based at a non-Australian club
- First Australia goal scorer at the Sydney Football Stadium
- Fifth Youngest Australia debutant (Sydney City)
- Fourth Youngest NSL debutant (Sydney City)
