= Giorgos Famelis =

Greek footballer

Personal information
- Full name: Georgios Famelis
- Date of birth: 19 August 1967 (age 59)
- Place of birth: Athens, Greece
- Height: 1.85 m (6 ft 1 in)
- Position: Midfielder

Youth career
- 1980–1983: Aris Voula
- 1983–1985: Panathinaikos

Senior career*
Years	Team	Apps	(Gls)
1985–1992	Panathinaikos	0	(0)
1983–1991	→ AO Vouliagmeni (loan)		
1988–1991	→ AEK Athens (loan)	51	(5)
1991–1992	→ Apollon Athens (loan)	7	(0)
1992–1995	Panionios		
1995–1996	Panetolikos		
1996–1997	Marko		
- * Club domestic league appearances and goals

Giorgos Famelis (Greek: Γιώργος Φαμέλης; born 19 August 1967) is a Greek former professional footballer who played as midfielder.

== Club career ==
Famelis started playing football in 1980 at Aris Voulas. He was transferred to Panathinaikos in 1983 and he was immediately loaned to AO Vouliagmenis. There, he was scouted by officials of AEK Athens in a match that they had gone to watch his teammate, Kostas Frantzeskos. In the summer of 1988, AEK were interested in signing him and despite an agreement between the presidents of the clubs, the transfer stuck due to the exorbitant clause of 30 million drachmas that Panathinaikos had set for the transfer. The solution was found through a three-year loan for 3 million drachmas with a purchase option. He helped the team to a large extent, being a useful tool in the hands of Dušan Bajević, as he was often the "twelfth player" of the team. In his first season with AEK, Famelis won the Championship in 1989. On 5 May 1991 he scored a brace in an away 2–5 win over Apollon Athens. During his spell at AEK he won a championship, a Greek Super Cup and a Greek League Cup.

Ιn July 1991 after his loan was expired, AEK did not enable his purchase option and Famelis was reloaned to Apollon Athens for a season. Afterwards he was released from Panathinaikos and signed for Panionios, playing in the second division for a season, where they won the promotion. In 1995, he moved to the third division side, Panetolikos, where he contributed in winning the league of their group and getting their promotion to the second division, in the end of the season. In 1996 he signed for Marko, where he ended his career at the end of the season.

== After football ==
After the end of his career as a footballer, Famelis worked as a scout in Panionios, worked in the small national teams, was a partner of Fernando Santos in Greece. In 2013 he became the General Manager of Asteras Varis. From January 2015, he took over as a scout for the academies of Panathinaikos. In July 2019, he resigned and was added to the scouting team of the academies of Olympiacos. In 2023 he became the technical director of Keravnos Keratea.

== Honours ==
AEK Athens

- Alpha Ethniki: 1988–89
- Greek Super Cup: 1989
- Greek League Cup: 1990

Panetolikos

- Gamma Ethniki: 1995–96 (South Group)
