= Toni Savevski =

Macedonian footballer and manager (born 1963)

Personal information
- Full name: Stanislav Savevski
- Date of birth: 14 June 1963 (age 63)
- Place of birth: Bitola, SR Macedonia, SFR Yugoslavia
- Height: 1.72 m (5 ft 8 in)
- Position: Midfielder

Youth career
- 1980: Pelister

Senior career*
| Years | Team | Apps | (Gls) |
| 1980–1988 | Vardar | 181 | (10) |
| 1988–2001 | AEK Athens | 357 | (52) |
| Total | | 538 | (62) |

International career
| 1988–1989 | Yugoslavia | 2 | (0) |
| 1994–2000 | Macedonia | 9 | (1) |

Managerial career
- 2001: AEK Athens
- 2001–2002: Apollon Limassol
- 2002–2004: Omonia
- 2012–2013: Omonia
- * Club domestic league appearances and goals

Toni Savevski (Macedonian: Тони Савевски; born 14 June 1963) is a Macedonian former professional footballer who played as a midfielder. After retiring as a footballer in 2001, he became a manager and managed several clubs in Cyprus, most notably Omonia.

== Club career ==
Savevski started his career at Pelister and in 1980 he moved to Vardar. In 1987 he initially won the Yugoslav First League, but after a point deduction imposed on Partizan was overturned, the title was ultimately awarded to the latter.

On 22 November 1988 he was transferred to the Greek side, AEK Athens at the request of their manager, Dušan Bajević for a fee of 34 million drachmas. He was immediately established as a regular in the midfield and had a major contribution in the conquest of the Championship at the end of the season, which was their first after 10 years.

Savevski emerged as one of the team's best players and alongside Stelios Manolas became the captains of the team during the 1990s. On the pitch he was known for his technique, stamina, work rate and teamwork. Moreover, he was able to contribute with his left foot providing passes, crosses, shots and set pieces, as well as his tactical awareness, defensive contribution and overall "cerebral" style of play. He was also distinguished for his low-key character and his off-field behavior that earned the appreciation of the supporters. On 24 August 1994 he scored the winner in the second leg against Rangers that sealed the team's qualification to the group stage of the UEFA Champions League. AEK became the first Greek club to qualify under the new format. There, he also scored crucial goals, such as the openers against Ajax at home on 28 September and against Milan away from home on 2 November.

He served AEK Athens for 13 years winning four Championships, three Cups, two Super Cups and the League Cup in 1990. He is the third foreigner in appearances in the history of the league, behind Krzysztof Warzycha and Predrag Đorđević. On 21 January 2001 Savevski played in a home match against Skoda Xanthi, that would ultimately be his last before retiring as a footballer.

== International career ==
Savevski made his senior debut for Yugoslavia on August 1988 in a friendly match against Switzerland away from home. He earned a total of 2 caps without scoring a goal.

Savevski also earned a total of nine caps for Macedonia. On October 1994 he made his debut in a European Championship qualification match against Spain. His final international was a September 2000 FIFA World Cup qualification match against Slovakia.

== Managerial career ==
On 26 January 2001, after the manager of AEK Athens, Giannis Pathiakakis resigned, Savevski retired as a footballer overnight and took over in his place with Eugène Gerards as technical advisor. In the summer of 2001, the administrative instability of the club resulted in Savevski and Gerards leaving the club.

He subsequently moved to Cyprus and became the manager of Apollon Limassol for a season. In the summer of 2002 he moved to Omonia, where in 2003 he won the Cypriot First Division and the Cypriot Super Cup, before leaving in 2004. In the summer of the same year, he assumed the position of technical director of the academies of AEK Athens. During his tenure, the youth system of the club was reorganized and developed. Players such as Sokratis Papastathopoulos, Kostas Manolas, Viktor Klonaridis, Panagiotis Tachtsidis and Vasilios Pliatsikas emerged through the academy. In the summer of 2010, Savevski was promoted to the position of head scouting of the team. On 26 September 2012, he returned to Omonia as their manager, a position he held until 19 December 2013.

On 2016 he also served AEK Athens in the scouting staff until May 2017.

== Personal life ==
Savevski had a humble upbringing and grew up in Bitola. After the birth of his first son, Victor, he moved to Greece where he settled in Athens. His second son was born in Athens.

== Honours ==
=== Player ===
AEK Athens

- Alpha Ethniki: 1988–89, 1991–92, 1992–93, 1993–94
- Greek Cup: 1995–96, 1996–97, 1999–2000
- Greek Super Cup: 1989, 1996
- Greek League Cup: 1990

=== Manager ===
Omonia

- Cypriot First Division: 2002–03
- Cypriot Super Cup: 2003
