= 1989 Greek Super Cup =

AEK Athens	Panathinaikos
1	1
- After extra time AEK Athens won 6–5 on penalties
- Date: 30 August 1989
- Venue: Olympic Stadium, Marousi, Athens
- Referee: Makis Germanakos (Athens)
- Attendance: 39,300

The 1989 Greek Super Cup was the 4th edition of the Greek Super Cup, an association football match contested by the winners of the previous season's Alpha Ethniki and Greek Cup competitions. The match took place on 30 August 1989 at the Athens Olympic Stadium. The contesting teams were the 1988–89 Alpha Ethniki champions, AEK Athens and the 1988–89 Greek Cup winners, Panathinaikos. AEK Athens won 6–5 on a penalty shoot-out after a 1–1 draw at the end of extra time.

== Venue ==
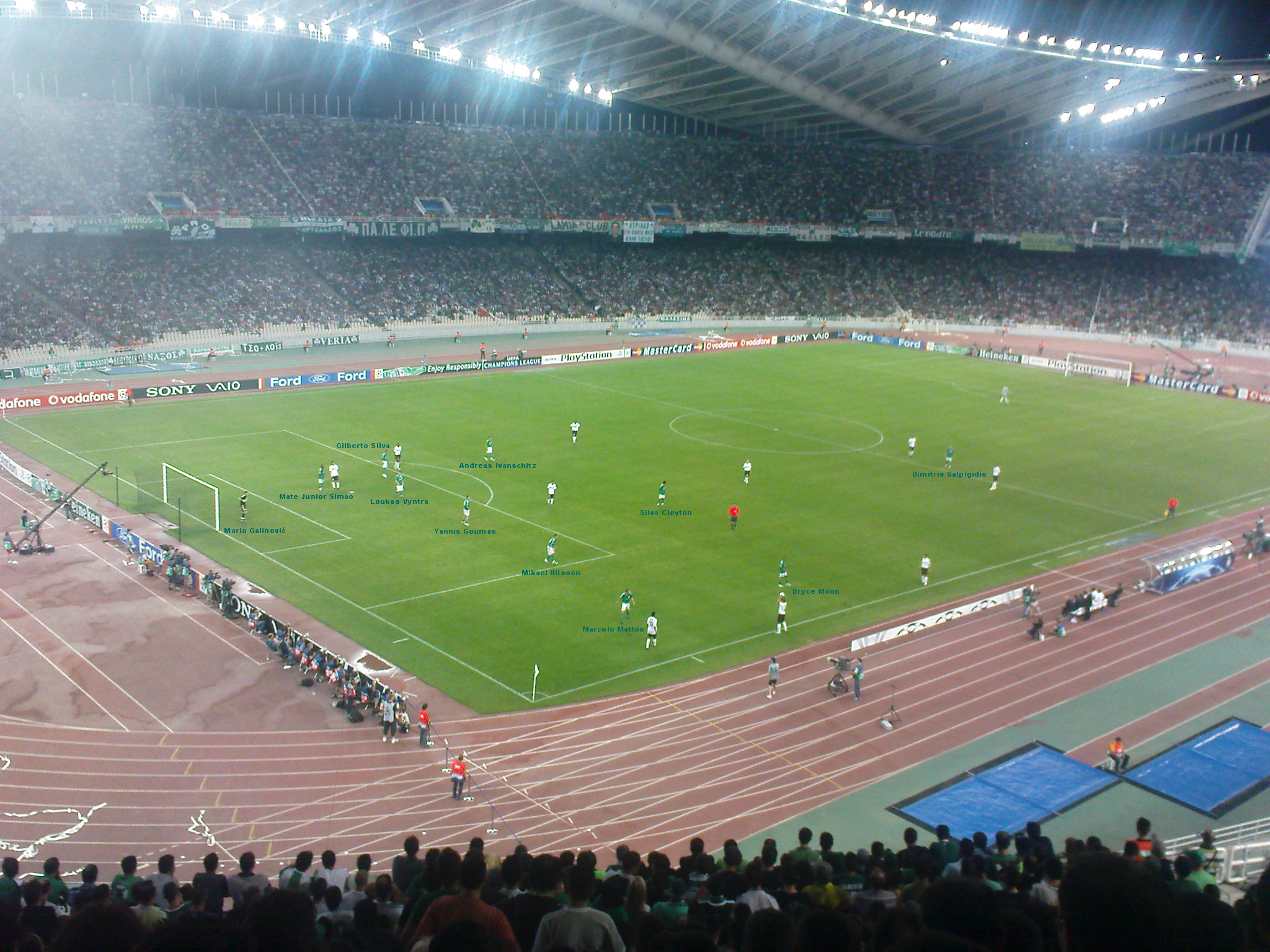
Athens Olympic Stadium.

This was the third Greek Super Cup held at the Athens Olympic Stadium, after 1987 and 1988.

The Athens Olympic Stadium was built in 1982. The stadium is used as a venue for Panathinaikos, Olympiacos and Greece and was used for AEK Athens in various occasions. Its current capacity is 80,000 and hosted a European Cup final in 1983 and a European Cup Winners' Cup final in 1987.

== Background ==
AEK Athens had never competed in the Greek Super Cup.

Panathinaikos participated in the Greek Super Cup one time in 1988, where they had won AEL by 3–1.

The two teams had never met each other in the Super Cup.

== Match ==
=== Details ===
30 August 1989
21:00 EEST (UTC+3)

AEK Athens	1–1 (a.e.t.)	Panathinaikos
Christodoulou 78'	Report	Vlachos 47'
Penalties
Savevski (penalty scored); Vasilopoulos (penalty scored); Karagiozopoulos (penalty scored); Stamatis (penalty scored); Okoński (penalty scored); Manolas (penalty scored)	6–5	(penalty scored) Vlachos; (penalty scored) Georgamlis; (penalty scored) Georgakopoulos; (penalty scored) Sarganis; (penalty scored) Saravakos; (penalty missed) Kalantzis

Olympic Stadium, Marousi
Attendance: 39,300
Referee: Makis Germanakos (Athens)

AEK Athens	Panathinaikos

GK	1	(Greece) Spyros Ikonomopoulos
RB	6	(Greece) Pavlos Papaioannou (c)
CB	4	(Greece) Stelios Manolas
CB	5	(Greece) Georgios Koutoulas
LB	2	(Greece) Christos Vasilopoulos
DM	3	(Greece) Stavros Stamatis	(yellow card) 119'
CM	7	(Australia) Jim Patikas	(yellow card) 113'
CM	8	(North Macedonia) Toni Savevski
RW	9	(Cyprus) Giorgos Savvidis		(substituted off) 82'
LW	11	(Greece) Georgios Christodoulou
CF	10	(Poland) Mirosław Okoński
Substitutes:
GK	15	(Greece) Antonis Minou
DF	12	(Greece) Takis Karagiozopoulos		(substituted on) 82'
DF		(Greece) Makis Chatzis
DF		(Greece) Giorgos Peppes
MF		(Greece) Giorgos Famelis
Manager:
(Socialist Federal Republic of Yugoslavia) Dušan Bajević

GK	1	(Greece) Giorgos Abadiotakis		(substituted off) 27'
RB	2	(Greece) Iakovos Chatziathanasiou	(yellow card) 99'
CB	6	(Greece) Kostas Mavridis (c)
CB	5	(Greece) Giannis Kalitzakis
LB	4	(Greece) Chris Kalantzis
DM	11	(Greece) Lysandros Georgamlis	(yellow card) 57'
CM	10	(Greece) Vangelis Vlachos
RM	8	(Greece) Kostas Antoniou
LM	9	(Australia) Jason Polak		(substituted off) 70'
SS	7	(Greece) Dimitris Saravakos
CF	3	(Greece) Giannis Samaras
Substitutes:
GK	15	(Greece) Nikos Sarganis		(substituted on) 27'
DF		(Greece) Nikos Kourbanas
MF		(Australia) Louis Christodoulou
MF	14	(Greece) Paris Georgakopoulos	(yellow card) 87'	(substituted on) 70'
MF		(Hungary) József Fitos
Manager:
(Sweden) Gunder Bengtsson

Match rules

- 90 minutes
- 30 minutes of extra time if necessary
- Penalty shootout if scores still level
- Five named substitutes
- Maximum of two substitutions
