= Mirosław Okoński =

Polish footballer

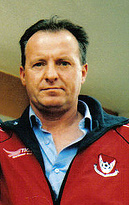

Personal information
- Full name: Mirosław Marian Okoński
- Date of birth: 8 December 1958 (age 67)
- Place of birth: Koszalin, Poland
- Height: 1.71 m (5 ft 7 in)
- Positions: Attacking midfielder; striker

Youth career
- 1969–1977: Gwardia Koszalin

Senior career*
Years	Team	Apps	(Gls)
1977–1979	Lech Poznań	68	(16)
1980–1981	Legia Warsaw	52	(15)
1982–1986	Lech Poznań	129	(53)
1986–1988	Hamburger SV	62	(15)
1988–1991	AEK Athens	77	(22)
1991–1992	Korinthos	18	(4)
1992	Lech Poznań	3	(0)
1993	Olimpia Poznań	9	(0)
1993	SC Concordia von 1907		
1994	FTSV Raspo Elmshorn		
1994–1995	Astra Krotoszyn		
1995–1996	Lipno Stęszew		
1996–1997	Gwardia Koszalin		
Total		418	(125)

International career
1977–1987	Poland	29	(2)
- * Club domestic league appearances and goals

Mirosław Okoński (born 8 December 1958 in Koszalin) is a Polish former professional footballer who played as an attacking midfielder.

== Club career ==
Okoński started his football career in 1969, in the second division of the Polish league with the team of his hometown, Gwardia Koszalin, which he played to until 1977. He then moved to the first division and Lech Poznań. In 1980 he was transferred to Legia Warsaw with which he won the Polish Cup in 1980 and 1981, while from 1982 to 1986 he returned to Lech Poznań. During his career in Poland he was the top scorer once, in 1983, and twice the runner-up in the league. In 1983 and 1984 he won back-to-back championships with Lech Poznan. In 1982 and 1984 he also won the Polish Cup. In 1986, he was transferred for around DM 700,000 to German side, Hamburger SV. He played there for the next two years and won the DFB-Pokal in 1987 and in the same year they finished second in the league. They played in the 1987 DFB-Supercup losing 2–1 from Bayern Munich with Okoński scoring the only goal for his club. During his stay there, he was named Best Foreign Player in Bundesliga.

On 4 July 1988, Okoński moved to Greece to transfer to AEK Athens for a fee of 100 million drachmas. Anderlecht, Paris Saint-Germain, Monaco and Olympiacos were also very interested in the footballer, with the latter ending up with Lajos Détári instead. In his first season at the club, he won the league being the team's top scorer and essentially their leader. He scored with a direct free kick against Panathinaikos and gave his team the victory in the away derby. On 7 May 1989 in an away match against Olympiacos at the Olympic Stadium, he combined 2 times with Karagiozopoulos, assisting him in one of the goal that gave AEK their first championship in 10 years. The following season was also very good winning the Greek Super Cup on penalties against Panathinaikos. On the contrary in his last season at AEK, affected both by the bad state of the club and by the rupture of his relations with the then coach Dušan Bajević, he did not performed as expected and left before the end of the season.

In the summer of 1991 Okoński was released from AEK and on 11 June he signed for the newly-promoted Korinthos, He played the club of Corinth for six months, before he left Greece in 1992 and returned to his homeland.

There he played a few games initially with Lech Poznan, later champions, ending the season with Olimpia Poznań. The following year he returned to Germany and played with SC Concordia von 1907, while in 1994 with FTSV Raspo Elmshorn in the 5th division of the German Championship. After a spell at Astra Krotoszyn he returned to Polland in 1995 and joined Lipno Stęszew and a year later his first team Gwardia Koszalin. In the last years of his career and post-retirement he has faced problems related to alcohol and gambling abuse.

== International career ==
From 1977 to 1987, Okoński played 29 times and scored 2 goals for the Poland national team, without participating in any major international tournament.

== After football ==
He currently lives in Poland and has occasionally worked as a player manager and as a newspaper columnist.

== Honours ==
Legia Warsaw

- Polish Cup: 1979–80, 1980–81

Lech Poznań

- Ekstraklasa: 1982–83, 1983–84, 1992–93
- Polish Cup: 1981–82, 1983–84
- Polish Super Cup: 1992

Hamburger SV

- DFB-Pokal: 1986–87

AEK Athens

- Alpha Ethniki: 1988–89
- Greek Super Cup: 1989
- Greek League Cup: 1990

Individual

- kicker Bundesliga Team of the Season: 1986–87
- Ekstraklasa top scorer: 1982–83
- Ekstraklasa Hall of Fame: 2022
- Lech Poznań All-time XI
