= Imre Boda =

Hungarian footballer

Personal information
- Full name: Imre Boda
- Date of birth: 10 October 1961 (age 65)
- Place of birth: Szolnok, Hungary
- Height: 1.85 m (6 ft 1 in)
- Position: Forward

Youth career
- MTK Budapest

Senior career*
Years	Team	Apps	(Gls)
1980–1987	MTK Budapest	190	(58)
1988	Vasas	14	(2)
1988–1990	Olympiacos Volos	43	(30)
1990–1991	OFI	24	(5)
1992–1993	Olympiacos Volos		
1993	BVSC Budapest	7	(0)

International career
1986–1989	Hungary	8	(3)
- * Club domestic league appearances and goals

Imre Boda (born 10 October 1961) is a retired Hungarian international footballer, who played as a forward.

== Club career ==
Boda began playing youth football with MTK Budapest FC. He would join the senior team in 1980, and make 190 league appearances for the club. A short spell with Vasas SC followed.

Boda moved to Greece in July 1988, initially joining Greek first division side Olympiacos Volos for two seasons. He would lead the Greek league in goal-scoring, notching 20 goals during the 1988–89 season. Olympiakos Volos were relegated after the 1989–90 season, and Boda moved to OFI for two seasons. However, he left the club in December 1991, and would return to Olympiakos Volos, now playing in the Greek second division.

After five seasons in Greek football, Boda returned to Hungary and joined BVSC Budapest for one season, playing his last match in October 1993.

== International career ==
Boda made eight appearances for the Hungary national football team, including two 1990 FIFA World Cup qualifying matches.
