= Thanasis Dimopoulos =

Greek footballer

Personal information
- Full name: Athanasios Dimopoulos
- Date of birth: 21 April 1963 (age 63)
- Place of birth: Xylokera, Pyrgos, Elis, Greece
- Position: Forward

Youth career
- 1977-1978: Ifaistos Vounargou

Senior career*
| Years | Team | Apps | (Gls) |
| 1978–1981 | Ifaistos Vounargou | | |
| 1981–1982 | Aias Gastouni | | |
| 1982–1987 | Panathinaikos | 99 | (29) |
| 1987–1992 | Iraklis | 134 | (50) |
| 1992–1993 | PAOK | 17 | (4) |
| 1993–1994 | Korinthos | | |
| 1994 | Ethnikos Piraeus | 7 | (0) |
| 1994–95 | AO Pyrgos | | |
| 1995 | AO Chania | 2 | (1) |
| 1996 | Aiolikos | 12 | (0) |
| 1997 | Orestis Orestiada | | |

International career
| 1981–1984 | Greece U21 | | |
| 1985–1989 | Greece | 4 | (0) |

Managerial career
- 2014: Anagennisi Giannitsa
- 2015–2017: Panelefsiniakos
- 2017: Panelefsiniakos (techn. director)
- * Club domestic league appearances and goals

Thanasis Dimopoulos (Greek: Θανάσης Δημόπουλος; born 21 April 1963) is a Greek former professional footballer who played as a forward. Alongside his brothers Christos Dimopoulos and Spyros he holds the world record for the highest number of siblings scoring on the same day, on 2 February 1992 in the Greek first division. His son Nikos plays for PAOK Academy.

== Club career ==
Dimopoulos started his career from Ifaistos Vounargou, a fifth-division club scoring 34 goals in the 1980–81 season. His performances impressed the league's champions Aias Gastouni who signed Dimopoulos for 1 million drachmas, a record for the division at the time. During his first season in the fourth division scored 25 goals helping his team finish 5th in the third group.
Despite PAOK's interest where his brother Christos was playing, Panathinaikos signed him in the summer of 1982. He impressed coach Ștefan Kovács in his first season with the Greens scoring 17 goals, most of them after coming off the bench. Panathinikos' squad had then many experienced players such as Mike Galakos, Kostas Mavridis, Juan Ramón Rocha, Giannis Kyrastas, and Tschen La Ling, even reaching the European Cup's semifinals in 1984–85 losing out to champions Liverpool.
Five years later he signed mid-season for Iraklis in a sqiad with players like Vasilis Hatzipanagis and Savvas Kofidis and helping his team qualify for the 1990-91 UEFA Cup. He moved to PAOK in 1992, while the 1994-95 season was his last in Alpha Ethniki with Ethnikos Piraeus.

== International career ==
Dimopoulos was called up by coach Stefanos Petritsis to the U-21 national team when he was still a fourth-division player. In 1985 he was called to the senior national team and played 4 matches in total.

== Honours ==
Panathinaikos

- Alpha Ethniki:1983–84, 1985–86
- Greek Cup:1983–84, 1985–86

Individual

- Greek Cup top scorer: 1983–84
