= 1989–90 Alpha Ethniki =

54th season of top-tier football league in Greece

Alpha Ethniki
- Season: 1989–90
- Champions: Panathinaikos; 15th Greek title
- Relegated: Apollon Kalamarias; Olympiacos Volos; Ethnikos Piraeus
- European Cup: Panathinaikos
- UEFA Cup: AEK Athens; Iraklis
- Cup Winners' Cup: Olympiacos
- Matches: 306
- Goals: 738 (2.41 per match)
- Top goalscorer: Thomas Mavros (22 goals)

The 1989–90 Alpha Ethniki was the 54th season of the highest football league of Greece. The season began on 17 September 1989 and ended on 27 May 1990. Panathinaikos won their 15th Greek title and their first one in four years.

The point system was: Win: 2 points - Draw: 1 point.

== Teams ==
Promoted from 1988–89 Beta Ethniki	Relegated from 1988–89 Alpha Ethniki
Xanthi; Panserraikos; Ionikos	Ethnikos Piraeus; Diagoras; Apollon Kalamarias

Location of teams in 1989–90 Alpha Ethniki

== League table ==
Pos	Team	Pld	W	D	L	GF	GA	GD	Pts	Qualification or relegation
1	Panathinaikos (C)	34	21	11	2	75	35	+40	53	Qualification for European Cup first round
2	AEK Athens	34	20	10	4	64	18	+46	50	One-year ban from European competitions (Note: AEK Athens were punished with a one-year ban from all European competitions by the UEFA disciplinary committee after being charged for the eventful European Cup match against Marseille on 1 November 1989.)
3	PAOK	34	19	8	7	49	26	+23	46	Qualification for UEFA Cup first round
4	Olympiacos	34	18	9	7	60	37	+23	45	Qualification for Cup Winners' Cup first round
5	Iraklis	34	14	11	9	44	36	+8	39	Qualification for UEFA Cup first round
6	OFI	34	16	4	14	52	41	+11	36	
7	Aris	34	11	13	10	37	40	−3	35	
8	AEL	34	12	10	12	35	38	−3	34	
9	Panionios	34	8	14	12	43	52	−9	30	
10	Doxa Drama	34	9	11	14	36	39	−3	29	
11	Xanthi	34	12	5	17	33	51	−18	29	
12	Panserraikos	34	9	11	14	32	42	−10	29	
13	Levadiakos (Note: Levadiakos were deducted 4 points because of attempting to fix a game in the previous season.)	34	12	8	14	34	45	−11	28	
14	Ionikos	34	8	12	14	27	48	−21	28	
15	Apollon Athens	34	8	12	14	33	35	−2	28	
16	Apollon Kalamarias (R)	34	7	13	14	30	38	−8	27	Relegation to Beta Ethniki
17	Olympiacos Volos (R)	34	10	2	22	32	63	−31	22	Relegation to Beta Ethniki
18	Ethnikos Piraeus (R)	34	7	6	21	20	52	−32	20	Relegation to Beta Ethniki

Source: RSSSF
Rules for classification: 1st points; 2nd head-to-head points; 3rd head-to-head goal difference; 4th decision match.
(C) Champions; (R) Relegated

== Results ==
Home \ Away	AEK	AEL	APA	APK	ARIS	DOX	ETH	ION	IRA	LEV	OFI	OLY	OLV	PAO	PGSS	PNS	PAOK	XAN
AEK Athens		3–1	2–0	3–0	1–1	1–0	2–1	2–0	4–0	4–0	2–0	0–0	4–0	1–1	7–1	4–0	2–1	8–0
AEL	1–0		2–3	3–0	1–1	1–0	2–0	0–1	0–0	2–1	1–0	1–1	2–0	1–4	3–1	1–0	0–1	3–1
Apollon Athens	0–0	0–0		1–1	1–1	1–0	3–0	0–0	0–2	0–0	4–0	0–1	2–2	0–1	3–2	0–0	2–0	3–0
Apollon Kalamarias	0–0	1–1	0–0		0–1	1–1	2–0	2–0	2–1	4–0	2–0	0–2	2–1	1–1	3–3	0–0	0–3	0–0
Aris	1–2	1–0	0–1	1–1		2–0	0–0	1–1	3–1	0–1	2–0	2–1	1–0	1–4	2–1	1–1	1–0	2–2
Doxa Drama	1–1	0–0	2–1	1–0	1–1		0–0	2–0	3–1	2–0	1–1	3–3	3–0	0–1	0–0	2–0	0–2	4–1
Ethnikos Piraeus	0–3	2–3	2–0	2–0	1–1	2–1		0–2	0–1	0–3	1–0	0–1	2–0	0–0	1–3	0–0	0–1	1–0
Ionikos	0–0	0–0	2–2	0–0	0–2	1–0	2–1		0–0	2–1	1–2	0–3	2–0	1–1	1–5	2–0	0–2	0–0
Iraklis	3–1	1–0	3–2	1–1	1–1	2–0	3–0	1–1		1–0	1–0	0–0	2–0	2–2	1–0	2–0	0–0	3–1
Levadiakos	0–1	0–0	1–0	1–0	2–1	2–2	0–0	4–1	1–0		1–0	1–0	2–1	1–3	1–1	3–0	1–1	1–0
OFI	3–1	4–1	2–1	1–0	4–0	3–1	2–0	1–2	2–3	2–0		1–1	2–1	0–2	4–0	4–1	0–0	3–0
Olympiacos	1–0	2–1	1–0	1–0	2–0	3–1	4–1	3–0	2–2	1–0	4–5		4–0	3–4	2–0	2–1	4–0	3–0
Olympiacos Volos	1–1	1–2	1–0	0–3	2–0	0–2	2–1	2–1	4–3	3–0	1–3	3–0		1–2	0–2	1–0	2–0	1–0
Panathinaikos	0–0	3–2	2–1	2–1	3–1	1–0	4–1	4–1	1–1	6–2	3–1	2–2	5–1		4–1	3–1	2–2	3–1
Panionios	0–1	0–0	1–1	1–1	0–0	0–0	2–0	1–1	1–1	3–3	1–0	0–0	4–1	0–0		3–0	1–3	2–5
Panserraikos	0–1	3–0	2–0	3–1	0–0	2–2	2–0	5–2	1–0	0–0	0–0	1–1	1–0	2–0	2–2		0–0	3–0
PAOK	1–1	3–0	1–1	2–1	2–0	3–1	0–1	0–0	2–1	2–1	2–0	4–1	3–0	2–1	1–0	3–1		0–1
Xanthi	0–1	0–0	1–0	1–0	2–4	2–0	3–0	1–0	1–0	2–0	0–2	4–1	2–0	0–0	0–1	2–0	0–2	

Source: RSSSF
Legend: Blue = home team win; Yellow = draw; Red = away team win.

== Top scorers ==
Rank	Player	Club	Goals
1	(Greece) Thomas Mavros	Panionios	22
2	(Hungary) Lajos Détári	Olympiacos	20
3	(Greece) Michalis Ziogas	AEL	18
4	(Cape Verde) Daniel Batista	AEK Athens	15
4	(Greece) Georgios Skartados	PAOK	15
6	(Poland) Krzysztof Warzycha	Panathinaikos	14
7	(Greece) Kostas Antoniou	Panathinaikos	13
8	(Greece) Dinos Kouis	Aris	12
9	(Greece) Georgios Vlastos	OFI	11
9	(Greece) Thanasis Dimopoulos	Iraklis	11
9	(Brazil) Marcelo Veridiano	Xanthi	11
9	(Australia) Jim Patikas	AEK Athens	11

== Attendances ==
Panathinaikos drew the highest average home attendance in the 1989–90 Alpha Ethniki.

#	Team	Average attendance
1	Panathinaikos	19,554
2	Olympiacos	14,439
3	AEK Athens	11,897
4	PAOK	10,276
5	Xanthi	6,904
6	AEL	6,045
7	OFI	5,822
8	Aris	5,793
9	Iraklis	5,558
10	Ethnikos Piraeus	5,060
11	Olympiacos Volos	4,342
12	Panserraikos	4,303
13	Ionikos	3,966
14	Panionios	3,578
15	Doxa Drama	3,075
16	Apollon Athens	2,772
17	Levadiakos	2,435
18	Apollon Kalamarias	2,314
