= 1988–89 Alpha Ethniki =

53rd season of top-tier football league in Greece

Alpha Ethniki
- Season: 1988–89
- Champions: AEK Athens; 8th Greek title
- Relegated: Diagoras
- European Cup: AEK Athens
- UEFA Cup: Olympiacos; Iraklis
- Cup Winners' Cup: Panathinaikos
- Matches: 240
- Goals: 566 (2.36 per match)
- Top goalscorer: Imre Boda (20 goals)

The 1988–89 Alpha Ethniki was the 53rd season of the highest football league of Greece. The season began on 11 September 1988 and ended on 21 May 1989. AEK Athens won their eighth Greek title and their first one in ten years. The championship was decided on the penultimate matchday in an informal final when AEK defeated the host Olympiakos at the Olympic Stadium by 1–0 with a goal by Takis Karagiozopoulos. This match, which essentially decided the title, was met by the very serious incidents between police forces and fans, with dozens injured, more than 7,000 seats broken and damages of 30 million drachmas.

The point system was: Win: 2 points - Draw: 1 point.

== Teams ==
| Promoted from 1987–88 Beta Ethniki | Relegated from 1987–88 Alpha Ethniki |
|---|---|
| Doxa Drama; Olympiacos Volos; Apollon Athens | Veria; Panserraikos; Panachaiki |

Location of teams in 1988–89 Alpha Ethniki

== League table ==
| Pos | Team | Pld | W | D | L | GF | GA | GD | Pts | Qualification or relegation |
|---|---|---|---|---|---|---|---|---|---|---|
| 1 | AEK Athens (C) | 30 | 19 | 6 | 5 | 45 | 20 | +25 | 44 | Qualification for European Cup first round |
| 2 | Olympiacos | 30 | 16 | 9 | 5 | 54 | 25 | +29 | 41 | Qualification for UEFA Cup first round |
| 3 | Panathinaikos | 30 | 14 | 9 | 7 | 45 | 25 | +20 | 37 | Qualification for Cup Winners' Cup first round |
| 4 | Iraklis | 30 | 13 | 10 | 7 | 43 | 27 | +16 | 36 | Qualification for UEFA Cup first round |
| 5 | OFI | 30 | 13 | 8 | 9 | 45 | 36 | +9 | 34 | |
| 6 | AEL | 30 | 10 | 14 | 6 | 37 | 34 | +3 | 34 | |
| 7 | Aris | 30 | 11 | 11 | 8 | 31 | 26 | +5 | 33 | |
| 8 | PAOK | 30 | 11 | 10 | 9 | 34 | 30 | +4 | 32 | |
| 9 | Doxa Drama | 30 | 10 | 8 | 12 | 26 | 28 | −2 | 28 | |
| 10 | Panionios | 30 | 10 | 7 | 13 | 32 | 36 | −4 | 27 | |
| 11 | Olympiacos Volos | 30 | 6 | 14 | 10 | 36 | 45 | −9 | 26 | |
| 12 | Levadiakos | 30 | 9 | 7 | 14 | 33 | 47 | −14 | 25 | |
| 13 | Apollon Athens | 30 | 7 | 9 | 14 | 29 | 38 | −9 | 23 | |
| 14 | Ethnikos Piraeus (O) | 30 | 6 | 11 | 13 | 31 | 49 | −18 | 23 | Qualification for relegation play-off |
| 15 | Diagoras (R) | 30 | 4 | 12 | 14 | 21 | 43 | −22 | 20 | Qualification for relegation play-off |
| 16 | Apollon Kalamarias (O) | 30 | 4 | 9 | 17 | 24 | 57 | −33 | 17 | Qualification for relegation play-off |

Source: RSSSF
Rules for classification: 1st points; 2nd head-to-head points; 3rd head-to-head goal difference; 4th decision match.
(C) Champions; (O) Play-off winners; (R) Relegated

== Results ==
| Home \ Away | AEK | AEL | APA | APK | ARIS | DIA | DOX | ETH | IRA | LEV | OFI | OLY | OLV | PAO | PGSS | PAOK |
|---|---|---|---|---|---|---|---|---|---|---|---|---|---|---|---|---|
| AEK Athens | | 3–3 | 4–2 | 3–1 | 0–1 | 2–1 | 2–0 | 2–0 | 1–0 | 5–1 | 3–0 | 1–2 | 3–2 | 0–0 | 2–0 | 0–0 |
| AEL | 0–1 | | 1–0 | 1–0 | 2–0 | 1–0 | 3–3 | 1–1 | 3–1 | 1–0 | 1–1 | 1–1 | 1–1 | 2–1 | 4–0 | 2–1 |
| Apollon Athens | 2–1 | 0–0 | | 0–0 | 0–0 | 1–2 | 0–1 | 4–0 | 2–1 | 2–0 | 0–0 | 0–2 | 0–0 | 2–1 | 1–1 | 2–0 |
| Apollon Kalamarias | 0–1 | 1–1 | 2–0 | | 1–2 | 0–3 | 1–1 | 0–0 | 1–1 | 1–0 | 0–3 | 1–2 | 2–2 | 0–3 | 3–2 | 1–4 |
| Aris | 1–0 | 0–0 | 3–1 | 3–0 | | 2–0 | 1–0 | 2–0 | 0–1 | 2–1 | 4–3 | 0–0 | 1–1 | 1–3 | 1–1 | 0–0 |
| Diagoras | 0–2 | 0–0 | 1–1 | 1–4 | 0–2 | | 0–2 | 2–0 | 2–1 | 1–1 | 1–1 | 0–2 | 0–0 | 0–2 | 1–1 | 1–1 |
| Doxa Drama | 1–2 | 2–0 | 1–0 | 1–0 | 0–0 | 1–1 | | 1–1 | 0–2 | 3–0 | 2–0 | 0–0 | 2–1 | 1–2 | 1–0 | 1–0 |
| Ethnikos Piraeus | 1–2 | 0–1 | 1–1 | 4–1 | 1–0 | 1–0 | 2–1 | | 1–1 | 1–2 | 2–4 | 0–3 | 4–0 | 0–0 | 1–1 | 2–1 |
| Iraklis | 0–0 | 4–1 | 3–1 | 2–1 | 1–0 | 3–0 | 1–0 | 3–0 | | 2–0 | 2–0 | 2–2 | 2–0 | 2–2 | 2–1 | 0–0 |
| Levadiakos | 0–0 | 1–1 | 1–0 | 2–1 | 1–1 | 1–1 | 1–1 | 2–2 | 3–2 | | 2–1 | 3–4 | 2–1 | 2–1 | 2–1 | 2–1 |
| OFI | 0–1 | 1–1 | 3–1 | 4–0 | 1–0 | 0–0 | 2–0 | 3–1 | 3–3 | 2–1 | | 2–1 | 2–1 | 2–1 | 1–2 | 3–1 |
| Olympiacos | 0–1 | 3–1 | 2–0 | 5–0 | 3–1 | 2–0 | 1–1 | 2–2 | 0–0 | 3–1 | 2–0 | | 7–2 | 1–1 | 1–0 | 0–1 |
| Olympiacos Volos | 1–1 | 2–2 | 2–1 | 1–1 | 1–1 | 1–1 | 2–0 | 1–1 | 0–0 | 2–1 | 0–1 | 1–1 | | 2–1 | 2–0 | 4–1 |
| Panathinaikos | 0–1 | 4–1 | 2–2 | 3–0 | 1–1 | 3–0 | 1–0 | 0–0 | 0–0 | 2–0 | 1–1 | 2–1 | 2–0 | | 3–2 | 1–0 |
| Panionios | 1–0 | 0–0 | 0–1 | 1–1 | 2–0 | 3–0 | 2–0 | 3–1 | 1–0 | 1–0 | 2–1 | 0–1 | 3–2 | 0–2 | | 0–0 |
| PAOK | 0–1 | 2–1 | 3–2 | 1–1 | 1–1 | 1–1 | 1–0 | 5–1 | 2–1 | 2–0 | 0–0 | 1–0 | 1–1 | 1–0 | 2–1 | |

Source: RSSSF
Legend: Blue = home team win; Yellow = draw; Red = away team win.

=== Play-off ===
5th place Play-Off
| Team 1 | Score | Team 2 |
|---|---|---|
| OFI | 3–1 | AEL |

- Relegation:

| Pos | Team | Pld | W | D | L | GF | GA | GD | Pts | Qualification or relegation |
|---|---|---|---|---|---|---|---|---|---|---|
| 1 | Ethnikos Piraeus | 5 | 5 | 0 | 0 | 9 | 2 | +7 | 10 | Qualified to Alpha Ethniki |
| 2 | Apollon Kalamarias | 5 | 3 | 1 | 1 | 5 | 2 | +3 | 7 | Qualified to Alpha Ethniki |
| 3 | PAS Giannina | 5 | 2 | 0 | 3 | 5 | 6 | −1 | 4 | Qualified to Beta Ethniki |
| 4 | Korinthos | 5 | 1 | 1 | 3 | 7 | 9 | −2 | 3 | Qualified to Beta Ethniki |
| 5 | Diagoras (R) | 5 | 1 | 1 | 3 | 5 | 9 | −4 | 3 | Qualified to Beta Ethniki |
| 6 | Veria | 5 | 1 | 1 | 3 | 5 | 8 | −3 | 3 | Qualified to Beta Ethniki |

Source: RSSSF
(R) Relegated

== Top scorers ==
| Rank | Player | Club | Goals |
|---|---|---|---|
| 1 | (Hungary) Imre Boda | Olympiacos Volos | 20 |
| 2 | (Hungary) Lajos Détári | Olympiacos | 15 |
| 3 | (Greece) Thanasis Dimopoulos | Iraklis | 13 |
| 4 | (Greece) Dimos Kavouras | Levadiakos | 12 |
| 4 | (Greece) Thomas Mavros | Panionios | 12 |
| 6 | (Poland) Mirosław Okoński | AEK Athens | 11 |
| 7 | (Chile) Jaime Vera | OFI | 10 |
| 7 | (Greece) Vasilis Dimitriadis | Aris | 10 |
| 7 | (Greece) Giannis Samaras | OFI / Panathinaikos | 10 |

== Attendances ==
Olympiacos drew the highest average home attendance in the 1988–89 Alpha Ethniki.

| # | Team | Average attendance |
|---|---|---|
| 1 | Olympiacos | 35,460 |
| 2 | Panathinaikos | 19,325 |
| 3 | AEK Athens | 15,464 |
| 4 | PAOK | 14,688 |
| 5 | Iraklis | 8,889 |
| 6 | Panionios | 7,746 |
| 7 | AEL | 7,514 |
| 8 | OFI | 7,426 |
| 9 | Aris | 6,696 |
| 10 | Ethnikos Piraeus | 6,251 |
| 11 | Olympiacos Volos | 5,730 |
| 12 | Apollon Athens | 4,199 |
| 13 | Doxa Drama | 4,020 |
| 14 | Levadiakos | 2,859 |
| 15 | Apollon Kalamarias | 2,617 |
| 16 | Diagoras | 2,503 |
