= 1991–92 Alpha Ethniki =

56th season of top-tier football league in Greece

Alpha Ethniki
- Season: 1991–92
- Champions: AEK Athens; 9th Greek title
- Relegated: Panionios; Panserraikos; Ethnikos Piraeus
- Champions League: AEK Athens
- Cup Winners' Cup: Olympiacos
- UEFA Cup: Panathinaikos; PAOK
- Matches: 306
- Goals: 735 (2.4 per match)
- Top goalscorer: Vasilis Dimitriadis (28 goals)

The 1991–92 Alpha Ethniki was the 56th season of the highest football league of Greece. The season began on 1 September 1991 and ended on 7 June 1992. AEK Athens won their ninth Greek title and their first one in three years.

The point system was: Win: 2 points - Draw: 1 point.

== Teams ==
Promoted from 1990–91 Beta Ethniki	Relegated from 1990–91 Alpha Ethniki
Ethnikos Piraeus; Korinthos; Pierikos	Ionikos; Levadiakos; PAS Giannina

=== Stadiums and personnel ===
Location of teams in 1991–92 Alpha Ethniki

Team	Manager^{1}	Location	Stadium
AEK Athens	(Socialist Federal Republic of Yugoslavia) Dušan Bajević	Athens (Nea Filadelfeia)	Nikos Goumas Stadium
AEL	(Bulgaria) Hristo Bonev	Larissa	Alcazar Stadium
Apollon Athens	(Greece) Christos Archontidis	Athens (Rizoupoli)	Rizoupoli Stadium
Aris	(Greece) Georgios Firos	Thessaloniki (Charilaou)	Kleanthis Vikelidis Stadium
Athinaikos	(Greece) Miltos Papapostolou	Athens (Vyronas)	Vyronas National Stadium
Doxa Drama	(Germany) Gerhard Prokop	Drama	Doxa Drama Stadium
Ethnikos Piraeus	(Greece) Lakis Petropoulos	Piraeus (Neo Faliro)	Karaiskakis Stadium
Iraklis	(Netherlands) Thijs Libregts	Thessaloniki (Triandria)	Kaftanzoglio Stadium
Korinthos	(Greece) Spyros Livathinos	Corinth	Korinthos Stadium
OFI	(Netherlands) Eugène Gerards	Heraklion	Theodoros Vardinogiannis Stadium
Olympiacos	(Ukraine) Oleh Blokhin	Piraeus (Neo Faliro)	Karaiskakis Stadium
Panachaiki	(Greece) Andreas Michalopoulos	Patras	Kostas Davourlis Stadium
Panathinaikos	(Greece) Vasilios Daniil	Athens (Marousi)	Athens Olympic Stadium
Panionios	(Socialist Federal Republic of Yugoslavia) Momčilo Vukotić	Athens (Nea Smyrni)	Nea Smyrni Stadium
Panserraikos	(Socialist Federal Republic of Yugoslavia) Todor Veselinović	Serres	Serres Municipal Stadium
PAOK	(Greece) Giannis Gounaris	Thessaloniki (Toumba)	Toumba Stadium
Pierikos	(Greece) Giannis Matzourakis	Katerini	Katerini Stadium
Skoda Xanthi	(Czechoslovakia) Vladimír Táborský	Xanthi	Xanthi Ground

- ^{1} On final match day of the season, played on 7 June 1992.

== League table ==
Pos	Team	Pld	W	D	L	GF	GA	GD	Pts	Qualification or relegation
1	AEK Athens (C)	34	23	8	3	72	25	+47	54	Qualification for Champions League first round
2	Olympiacos	34	20	11	3	74	30	+44	51	Qualification for Cup Winners' Cup first round
3	Panathinaikos	34	21	6	7	66	21	+45	48	Qualification for UEFA Cup first round
4	PAOK	34	13	13	8	44	44	0	39	Qualification for UEFA Cup first round
5	Apollon Athens	34	14	7	13	35	34	+1	35	
6	OFI	34	11	12	11	34	30	+4	34	
7	Aris	34	12	7	15	26	40	−14	31	
8	AEL	34	11	9	14	40	46	−6	31	
9	Iraklis	34	10	11	13	41	41	0	31	
10	Korinthos	34	12	7	15	38	47	−9	31	
11	Pierikos	34	11	8	15	41	56	−15	30	
12	Athinaikos	34	10	10	14	36	41	−5	30	
13	Doxa Drama	34	9	11	14	39	38	+1	29	
14	Skoda Xanthi	34	13	3	18	36	48	−12	29	
15	Panachaiki	34	12	5	17	42	56	−14	29	
16	Panionios (R)	34	9	11	14	32	51	−19	29	Relegation to Beta Ethniki
17	Panserraikos (R)	34	9	8	17	29	59	−30	26	Relegation to Beta Ethniki
18	Ethnikos Piraeus (R)	34	7	11	16	30	48	−18	25	Relegation to Beta Ethniki

Source: RSSSF
Rules for classification: 1st points; 2nd head-to-head points; 3rd head-to-head goal difference; 4th decision match.
(C) Champions; (R) Relegated

== Results ==
Home \ Away	AEK	AEL	APA	ARIS	ATH	DOX	ETH	IRA	KOR	OFI	OLY	PNA	PAO	PGSS	PNS	PAOK	PIE	XAN
AEK Athens		3–0	2–0	3–1	0–0	1–1	3–0	2–0	2–1	3–0	1–1	5–1	0–0	6–0	2–1	3–1	2–0	4–1
AEL	0–2		0–0	1–0	1–1	1–1	2–0	1–1	2–0	1–0	0–0	3–0	0–3	4–0	3–1	0–0	3–1	2–0
Apollon Athens	0–2	1–0		2–0	0–0	2–0	3–0	1–0	1–0	0–0	2–2	3–1	0–3	1–0	3–1	2–0	2–1	2–0
Aris	0–0	3–0	1–0		1–0	0–3	2–0	0–0	1–0	0–0	1–0	2–1	0–1	0–0	0–2	1–1	1–0	2–0
Athinaikos	2–3	3–3	1–1	2–1		2–1	2–1	1–0	2–0	0–0	0–3	1–0	3–1	4–1	2–0	1–1	0–0	1–2
Doxa Drama	1–5	3–1	0–0	0–1	0–0		1–1	3–0	0–0	2–0	0–0	3–0	0–1	0–0	3–0	0–0	1–2	3–0
Ethnikos Piraeus	1–1	2–0	2–1	2–1	1–2	1–2		2–0	1–3	1–0	1–1	1–1	0–0	0–0	2–2	1–1	2–2	3–2
Iraklis	0–3	0–0	0–2	1–1	1–0	1–1	3–1		5–1	1–0	0–0	4–0	1–0	2–1	5–0	2–2	1–1	2–0
Korinthos	1–2	0–0	2–0	0–1	2–0	4–2	2–0	3–1		2–1	1–1	1–0	0–2	1–2	1–0	1–1	2–2	3–1
OFI	2–1	5–1	0–0	4–0	1–0	1–0	1–0	1–0	0–0		2–2	1–1	0–2	1–1	3–1	1–1	1–1	1–0
Olympiacos	4–2	3–1	3–0	4–0	1–0	2–1	2–0	2–0	0–0	0–0		5–2	1–1	3–1	7–0	3–2	5–0	2–0
Panachaiki	2–3	3–2	1–0	2–1	3–1	1–0	1–0	4–2	2–0	0–3	0–2		0–1	2–1	5–0	3–3	2–0	2–0
Panathinaikos	2–0	1–3	1–2	3–0	3–1	2–1	2–1	3–1	7–0	1–1	3–0	3–1		5–0	0–1	5–1	4–0	3–0
Panionios	0–1	1–0	2–0	4–1	1–0	1–3	0–0	2–2	1–0	3–1	1–4	0–0	0–0		2–1	1–1	4–2	0–0
Panserraikos	0–2	2–1	2–1	1–0	3–1	1–1	2–2	0–0	1–2	1–0	0–2	1–0	0–0	1–1		0–0	1–1	2–0
PAOK	2–2	2–1	2–1	1–1	2–1	3–2	0–1	0–3	2–1	1–0	1–2	1–0	1–0	1–0	3–0		2–1	2–1
Pierikos	0–1	1–2	3–1	0–2	2–1	1–0	2–0	2–2	2–1	2–1	2–5	1–1	1–3	2–0	3–1	1–2		1–0
Skoda Xanthi	0–0	3–1	2–1	2–0	1–1	3–0	1–0	1–0	2–3	1–2	5–2	2–0	1–0	2–1	1–0	2–1	0–1	

Source: RSSSF
Legend: Blue = home team win; Yellow = draw; Red = away team win.

== Top scorers ==
Rank	Player	Club	Goals
1	(Greece) Vasilis Dimitriadis	AEK Athens	28
2	(Greece) Dimitris Saravakos	Panathinaikos	24
3	(Greece) Panagiotis Tsalouchidis	Olympiacos	15
3	(Serbia and Montenegro) Bogoljub Ranđelović	Pierikos	15
3	(Ukraine) Oleh Protasov	Olympiacos	15
6	(Greece) Thanasis Dimopoulos	Iraklis	12
6	(Greece) Christos Dimopoulos	Athinaikos	12
6	(Poland) Krzysztof Warzycha	Panathinaikos	12
9	(Greece) Alekos Alexandris	AEK Athens	11
9	(Nigeria) Amaechi Ottiji	Panachaiki	11

== Attendances ==
Olympiacos drew the highest average home attendance in the 1991–92 Alpha Ethniki.

#	Team	Average attendance
1	Olympiacos	18,388
2	Panathinaikos	15,417
3	AEK Athens	13,422
4	PAOK	7,716
5	Aris	5,820
6	AEL	5,512
7	Skoda Xanthi	4,229
8	Ethnikos Piraeus	4,092
9	Korinthos	3,754
10	OFI	3,676
11	Panachaiki	3,548
12	Panserraikos	3,420
13	Panionios	3,326
14	Iraklis	3,036
15	Pierikos	2,936
16	Athinaikos	2,541
17	Apollon Athens	2,513
18	Doxa Drama	2,388
