= 1992–93 AEK Athens F.C. season =

AEK Athens
1992–93 season
- Chairman: Dimitris Melissanidis (until 15 June); Giannis Karras
- Manager: Dušan Bajević
- Stadium: Nikos Goumas Stadium
- Alpha Ethniki: 1st
- Greek Cup: Semi-finals
- Greek Super Cup: Runners-up
- UEFA Champions League: Second round
- Top goalscorer: League: Vasilis Dimitriadis (33); All: Vasilis Dimitriadis (44)
- Highest home attendance: 31,050 (vs PSV Eindhoven) (21 October 1992)
- Lowest home attendance: 2,539 (vs Poseidon Michaniona) (23 August 1992)
- Average home league attendance: 14,955
- Biggest win: AEK Athens 7–0 Korinthos
- Biggest defeat: PSV Eindhoven 3–0 AEK Athens
Home colours	Away colours	Third colours

The 1992–93 season was the 69th season in the existence of AEK Athens F.C. and the 34th consecutive season in the top flight of Greek football. They competed in the Alpha Ethniki, the Greek Cup, the Greek Super Cup and the UEFA Champions League. The season began on 16 August 1992 and finished on 6 June 1993.

== Kits ==
Supplier: Diadora
Sponsor(s): Phoenix Asfaleies

Home	Away	Third

== Overview ==
The summer of 1992 was historic, since the club changed hands after 11 whole years. Andreas Zafiropoulos transferred the majority of the shares to the duo of Melissanidis and Ioannis Karras. The new owners of the club, without being famous for their huge "wealth" at the time, but with their experience from managing smaller clubs, their passion for football and their indisputable abilities, proved to be decisive factors during their administrative tenure. The first thing they did was to back up Dušan Bajević. However, their term at the club began with great difficulties since two very important players from the previous season left before the 2 businessmen took over the team. Specifically, Daniel Batista chose to move to Olympiacos, while Giorgos Savvidis decided to return to Cyprus. On the other hand, they made some not so impressive, but useful transfers with the signings of Slišković, Agorogiannis, Mitropoulos, Papadopoulos and Atmatsidis. Furthermore, in December Tsiartas and Kopitsis were transferred to the club.

Bajević again displayed a well-worked team, which passionately claimed the championship since the beginning of the season, while also presenting quite a spectacle. Eventually, AEK won the championship for the second consecutive season, this time with a one-point difference from the second Panathinaikos. The biggest victory of the season was an impressive 7–0 over Korinthos. The victory during the last game against the indifferent Olympiacos at Nea Filadelfeia, sealed the title over Panathinaikos. AEK had the total of 17 wins out of 17 games at their home ground and were first in the standings for 32 of the 34 matchdays of the championship.

In the first round of UEFA Champions League, AEK faced APOEL in a seemingly easy draw for the Greek champions. Fast enough, their excitement proved reckless in the first leg, which ended at 1–1. Thus, the Cypriots gained a qualification advantage and AEK's trip to Nicosia was predicted to be much more difficult than expected. In the second leg, AEK led relatively early with 2–0, however, towards the end of the match and after defensive mistakes, they were equalized, with the result that until the end of the match was in danger of being disqualified. The Cypriots pressed hard, the moments in defense were nightmarish, however, after hard work and suffering, the team secured qualification to the second round of the competition. AEK's next opponent was the mighty PSV Eindhoven, who lined up with all their stars except Romário, who Westerhof kept in the bench. Very quickly, however, due to Vanenburg's injury, the great Brazilian striker entered the game and forced AEK to back down in the second half, despite their offensive approach until that time. During the second half, AEK took the lead with a goal of incredible beauty by Dimitriadis. From that point on, the Dutch began to press hard and show their footballing qualities with AEK resisting with great success and eventually securing the victory. The rematch in the Netherlands did not start with the best of signs, as already at the end of the game in the match at Nikos Goumas Stadium, Romário boldly declared that PSV would not face a problem in the rematch, as he himself would score 3 goals. In a nightmarish night for Christos Vasilopoulos, Romário's "prophecy" came true and PSV scattered AEK with a score of 3–0, with a hat-trick by the Brazilian superstar. At no point in the game the team of Bajević was able to react and fatefully the fair elimination came to be.

In the first round of the Cup, AEK easily finished first in a group with Apollon Athens, Panargiakos, Poseidon Michaniona. Afterwards they easily eliminated Ionikos with 2 victories and with much more difficulty, Atromitos. In the quarter-finals, they lost 1–0 to AEL at the Alcazar Stadium and won 1–0 at home. The match went to extra time, at the beginning of which AEL scored, but in the end with 2 goals the yellow-blacks got a great qualification-thriller, with a final score of 3–1. In the semi-finals of the tournament, AEK were drawn against Olympiacos, from whom they lost in the first match 1–0, away from home. In the rematch, AEK equalized the score of the first match and the match went to extra time for the 3rd consecutive round. The red and whites scored with a questionable penalty and then made it 1–2, while AEK again scoring 2 goals in the last quarter of overtime, simply got an honorable victory by 3–2 and the elimination from the tournament.

The main players of AEK for this season were Vasilis Dimitriadis, Toni Savevski, Stelios Manolas, Alexis Alexandris, Refik Šabanadžović and Antonis Minou. Dimitriadis was the top scorer of AEK and of the league with 33 goals in 34 matches and even emerged as the 2nd scorer in Europe, winning the European Silver Shoe.

== Management team ==
Position	Staff
Manager	(Bosnia and Herzegovina) Dušan Bajević
Assistant manager	(Greece) Petros Ravousis
Goalkeeping coach	(Greece) Stelios Serafidis
Fitness coach	(Greece) Dimitris Bouroutzikas
Academy director	(Greece) Andreas Stamatiadis
Scout	(Greece) Aris Tsachouridis
Head of Medical	(Greece) Lakis Nikolaou

== Players ==
=== Squad information ===
NOTE: The players are the ones that have been announced by the AEK Athens' press release. No edits should be made unless a player arrival or exit is announced. Updated 6 June 1993, 23:59 UTC+3.

Player	Nat.	Position(s)	Date of birth (Age)	Signed	Previous club	Transfer fee	Contract until
Goalkeepers
Antonis Minou (Vice-captain 2)	(Greece)	GK	4 May 1958 (aged 35)	1988	(Greece) Panathinaikos	₯50,000,000	1993
Spyros Ikonomopoulos	(Greece)	GK	25 July 1959 (aged 33)	1979	(Greece) AEK Athens U20	—	1995
Ilias Atmatsidis	(Greece)	GK	24 April 1969 (aged 24)	1992	(Greece) Pontioi Veria	₯40,000,000	1996
Defenders
Takis Karagiozopoulos	(Greece)	CB / DM / ST	4 February 1961 (aged 32)	1981	(Greece) Veria	₯8,000,000	1993
Stelios Manolas	(Greece)	CB / RB	13 July 1961 (aged 31)	1980	(Greece) AEK Athens U20	—	1993
Christos Vasilopoulos (Captain)	(Greece)	RB / LB	12 November 1962 (aged 30)	1986	(Greece) Panachaiki	₯8,000,000	1993
Georgios Agorogiannis	(Greece)	RB / RM / RW	3 May 1966 (aged 27)	1992	(Greece) AEL	₯35,000,000	1996
Georgios Koutoulas (Vice-captain)	(Greece)	CB / LB	9 February 1967 (aged 26)	1987	(Greece) AEK Athens U20	—	1996
Manolis Papadopoulos	(Greece)	CB	22 April 1968 (aged 25)	1992	(Greece) Olympiacos	Free	1995
Vaios Karagiannis	(Greece)	LB / CB	25 June 1968 (aged 25)	1990	(Greece) A.O. Karditsa	₯11,000,000	1996
Charis Kopitsis	(Greece)	RB / RM / LB / LM	5 March 1969 (aged 24)	1992	(Greece) Panionios	Free	1997
Midfielders
Tasos Mitropoulos	(Greece)	AM / SS / ST	23 August 1957 (aged 35)	1992	(Greece) Olympiacos	Free	1994
Pavlos Papaioannou	(Greece) (Brazil)	DM / RB / LB / RM	19 May 1959 (aged 34)	1983	(Greece) Rodos	₯10,000,000	1993
Lampros Georgiadis	(Greece)	LM / AM / LB	11 July 1963 (aged 29)	1986	(Greece) Anagennisi Arta	₯11,000,000	1994
Toni Savevski	(North Macedonia)	CM / LM / DM	14 July 1963 (aged 29)	1988	(North Macedonia) Vardar	₯34,000,000	1993
Refik Šabanadžović	(Bosnia and Herzegovina) (Federal Republic of Yugoslavia)	DM / CM / CB / RB	2 August 1965 (aged 27)	1991	(Federal Republic of Yugoslavia) Red Star Belgrade	₯18,700,000	1994
Stavros Stamatis	(Greece)	DM / CM / CB / RB / LB / AM	31 January 1966 (aged 27)	1988	(Greece) Charavgiakos	₯22,000,000	1993
Vasilios Tsiartas	(Greece)	AM / RM / LM / SS	12 November 1972 (aged 20)	1992	(Greece) Naoussa	₯70,000,000	1997
Forwards
Vasilis Dimitriadis	(Greece)	ST	1 February 1966 (aged 27)	1991	(Greece) Aris	₯95,000,000	1996
Zoran Slišković	(Croatia)	ST / SS	1 March 1966 (aged 27)	1992	(Croatia) HAŠK Građanski	Free	1995
Frank Klopas	(United States) (Greece)	SS / ST / AM	1 September 1966 (aged 26)	1988	(United States) Chicago Sting	Free	1993
Alexis Alexandris	(Greece)	ST / RW	21 October 1968 (aged 24)	1991	(Greece) Veria	₯45,000,000	1994
Samouil Drakopulos	(Switzerland) (Greece)	ST / RW	31 July 1974 (aged 18)	1992	(Switzerland) Grasshopper	₯55,000,000	1995
Left during Winter Transfer window
Georgios Theodoridis	(Greece)	CB	8 July 1973 (aged 19)	1991	(Greece) Doxa Markochori	₯5,700,000	1995
Jim Patikas	(Australia) (Greece)	RM / LM / RW / LW / SS	18 October 1963 (aged 29)	1985	(Australia) Sydney Croatia	Free	1993
Nikos Ladogiannis	(Greece)	CM	12 June 1972 (aged 21)	1991	(Greece) AEK Athens U20	—	1996
Giorgos Kakousios	(Greece)	ST	16 January 1972 (aged 21)	1991	(Germany) 1. FC Nürnberg II	Free	1994

== Transfers ==
=== In ===
==== Summer ====
Pos.	Player	From	Fee	Date	Contract Until	Source
GK	(Greece) Ilias Atmatsidis	(Greece) Pontioi Veria	₯40,000,000	24 June 1992	30 June 1996	
DF	(Greece) Manolis Papadopoulos	(Greece) Olympiacos	Free transfer	14 July 1992	30 June 1995	
DF	(Greece) Georgios Agorogiannis	(Greece) AEL	₯35,000,000	1 July 1992	30 June 1996	
MF	(Greece) Tasos Mitropoulos	(Greece) Olympiacos	Free transfer	15 July 1992	30 June 1993	
FW	(Croatia) Zoran Slišković	(Croatia) HAŠK Građanski	₯60,000,000	14 July 1992	30 June 1995	

==== Winter ====
Pos.	Player	From	Fee	Date	Contract Until	Source
DF	(Greece) Charis Kopitsis	(Greece) Panionios	Free transfer	2 December 1992	31 December 1997	
MF	(Greece) Vasilios Tsiartas	(Greece) Naoussa	₯70,000,000^{[a]}	30 November 1992	31 December 1997	
FW	(Switzerland) Samouil Drakopulos	(Switzerland) Grasshopper	₯55,000,000	13 December 1992	31 December 1996	

Notes

a. plus the incomes from their two scheduled friendly games.

=== Out ===
==== Summer ====
Pos.	Player	To	Fee	Date	Source
GK	(Greece) Fanis Kofinas	(Greece) Egaleo	Contract termination	13 July 1992	
DF	(Greece) Makis Chatzis	Retired		1 July 1992	
MF	(Cyprus) Giorgos Savvidis	(Cyprus) Omonia	End of contract	1 July 1992	
FW	(Cape Verde) Daniel Batista	(Greece) Olympiacos	End of contract	1 July 1992	

==== Winter ====
Pos.	Player	To	Fee	Date	Source
MF	(Australia) Jim Patikas	(Greece) Athinaikos	Contract termination	11 December 1992	

=== Loan out ===
==== Winter ====
Pos.	Player	To	Fee	Date	Until	Option to buy	Source
DF	(Greece) Georgios Theodoridis	(Greece) Pierikos	Free	27 November 1992	30 November 1993	✗	
MF	(Greece) Nikos Ladogiannis	(Greece) Charavgiakos	Free	14 December 1992	30 June 1993	✗	
FW	(Greece) Giorgos Kakousios	(Greece) Diagoras	Free	18 December 1992	30 June 1993	✗	

=== Contract renewals ===
Pos.	Player	Date	Former Exp. Date	New Exp. Date	Source
GK	(Greece) Spyros Ikonomopoulos	11 June 1993	30 June 1993	30 June 1995	
DF	(Greece) Georgios Koutoulas	14 June 1993	30 June 1993	30 June 1996	
MF	(Greece) Tasos Mitropoulos	11 June 1993	30 June 1993	30 June 1994	
FW	(Greece) Vasilis Dimitriadis	14 June 1993	30 June 1993	30 June 1996	

=== Overall transfer activity ===
==== Expenditure ====
Summer: ▼ ₯135,000,000

Winter: ▼ ₯125,000,000

Total: ▼ ₯260,000,000

==== Income ====
Summer: ▲ ₯0

Winter: ▲ ₯0

Total: ▲ ₯0

==== Net Totals ====
Summer: ▼ ₯135,000,000

Winter: ▼ ₯125,000,000

Total: ▼ ₯260,000,000

== Pre-season and friendlies ==
19 July 1992 Friendly	Malaysia Olympic	0–4	AEK Athens	Wil
17:30 EEST (UTC+3)		Report	Alexandris 47'; Patikas 58', 65'; Dimitriadis 80'	Stadium: Wil Training Center

26 July 1992 Friendly	Hellas Schierstein	2–25	AEK Athens	Wil
18:30 EEST (UTC+3)	Koustidakos 87'; Tsachpinis 89'	Report	Dimitriadis 10', 22', 24', 36', 40', 42', 45'; Alexandris 26', 33'; Patikas 34', 38'; Paço 48', 52', 67'; Mitropoulos 55', 86'; Kakiousos 57', 58'; Koutoulas 59', 70', 80'; Georgiadis 71'; Ladogiannis 79'; Loukinas 84'; Karagiozopoulos 90'	Stadium: Wil Training Center; Attendance: 2,000

28 July 1992 Friendly	FC Wil	0–3	AEK Athens	Wil
18:30 EEST (UTC+3)		Report	Paço 35'; Mitropoulos 50'; Karagiozopoulos 88'	Stadium: Wil Training Center

29 July 1992 Friendly	Rot-Weiß Lüdenscheid	0–2	AEK Athens	Wil
20:30 EEST (UTC+3)		Report	Patikas 17'; Dimitriadis 55'	Stadium: Wil Training Center

3 August 1992 Friendly	AEK Athens	0–0	Iraklis	Nea Filadelfeia
21:00 EEST (UTC+3)	Karagiozopoulos (red card) 88'	Report	Mallios (yellow card) 62'; Anatolakis (yellow card) 79'	Stadium: Nikos Goumas Stadium; Attendance: 7,085; Referee: Giorgos Giannopoulos (Athens)

5 August 1992 Friendly	AEK Athens	4–0	Sheffield Wednesday	Nea Filadelfeia
21:00 EEST (UTC+3)	Dimitriadis 22' (pen.), 44'; Paço 67'; Anderson 85' (o.g.)	Report	Nilsson (yellow card) 21'	Stadium: Nikos Goumas Stadium; Attendance: 4,944; Referee: Vassilios Nikakis (Aetoloacarnania)

10 August 1992 Friendly	AEK Athens	4–1	PAOK	Nea Filadelfeia
21:00 EEST (UTC+3)	Slišković 11'; Šabanadžović 60'; Stamatis 63'; Dimitriadis 85'	Report	Borbokis 87'	Stadium: Nikos Goumas Stadium; Referee: Sotiris Vorgias (Athens)

12 August 1992 Friendly	AEK Athens	5–0	Proodeftiki	Nea Filadelfeia
21:00 EEST (UTC+3)	Georgiadis 40', 79' (pen.); Šabanadžović 44'; Slišković 56'; Giannios 73' (o.g.)	Report		Stadium: Nikos Goumas Stadium; Attendance: 1,700; Referee: Kostas Dimitriadis (Piraeus)

22 May 1993 Friendly	Acharnaikos	1–3	AEK Athens	Acharnes
16:00 EEST (UTC+3)	Koutras 22'	Report	Slišković 31'; Drakopulos 36'; Karagiozopoulos 61'	Stadium: Acharnes Stadium; Attendance: 2,000

== Competitions ==
=== Overall record ===
Competition	First match	Last match	Starting round	Final position	Record							
Competition	First match	Last match	Starting round	Final position	Pld	W	D	L	GF	GA	GD	Win %
Alpha Ethniki	6 September 1992	6 June 1993	Matchday 1	Winners	34	24	6	4	78	27	+51	70.59
Greek Cup	16 August 1992	14 April 1993	Group Stage	Semi-finals	11	7	2	2	23	10	+13	63.64
Greek Super Cup	29 August 1992		Final	Runners-up	1	0	0	1	1	3	−2	0.00
UEFA Champions League	16 September 1992	4 November 1992	First round	Second round	4	1	2	1	4	6	−2	25.00
Total					50	32	10	8	106	46	+60	64.00

Last updated: 6 June 1993
Source: Competitions

=== Alpha Ethniki ===
==== League table ====
Pos	Team	Pld	W	D	L	GF	GA	GD	Pts	Qualification or relegation
1	AEK Athens (C)	34	24	6	4	78	27	+51	78	Qualification for Champions League first round
2	Panathinaikos	34	24	5	5	85	21	+64	77	Qualification for Cup Winners' Cup first round
3	Olympiacos	34	20	8	6	68	31	+37	68	Qualification for UEFA Cup first round
4	OFI	34	19	9	6	64	32	+32	66	Qualification for UEFA Cup first round
5	PAOK	34	17	6	11	52	38	+14	57	

Source: RSSSF
Rules for classification: 1st points; 2nd head-to-head points; 3rd head-to-head goal difference; 4th decision match.
(C) Champions

==== Results summary ====
Overall								Home						Away					
Pld	W	D	L	GF	GA	GD	Pts	W	D	L	GF	GA	GD	W	D	L	GF	GA	GD
34	24	6	4	78	27	+51	78	17	0	0	53	10	+43	7	6	4	25	17	+8

Source: Competitive matches

==== Results by Matchday ====
Round	1	2	3	4	5	6	7	8	9	10	11	12	13	14	15	16	17	18	19	20	21	22	23	24	25	26	27	28	29	30	31	32	33	34
Ground	H	H	A	H	A	A	H	A	H	A	H	A	H	H	A	H	A	A	A	H	A	H	H	A	H	A	H	A	H	A	A	H	A	H
Result	W	W	W	W	D	W	W	W	W	D	W	W	W	W	D	W	L	D	D	W	D	W	W	W	W	L	W	L	W	W	L	W	W	W
Position	4	1	1	2	2	2	1	1	1	1	1	1	1	1	1	1	1	1	1	1	1	1	1	1	1	2	1	2	1	1	1	1	1	1

Source: Competitive matches
A = Away; H = Home; W = Win; D = Draw; L = Loss; P = Postponed

==== Matches ====
6 September 1992 1	AEK Athens	1–0	Aris	Nea Filadelfeia
17:30 EEST (UTC+3)	Papaioannou (yellow card) 2'; Alexandris 50'		Dalkidis (yellow card) 26'; Lončar (yellow card) 27'; Tsimpos (yellow card) 55'	Stadium: Nikos Goumas Stadium; Attendance: 16,309; Referee: Markos Zabetakis (Thessaloniki)

13 September 1992 2	AEK Athens	5–1	Athinaikos	Nea Filadelfeia
17:00 EEST (UTC+3)	Karagiannis (yellow card); Dimitriadis 12', 57', 78' (pen.), 89', (yellow card); Slišković (yellow card) 50', (goal) 85'		Anastasiou (yellow card); Chatziangelis (yellow card); Gavasiadis (yellow card); Alvertis 62'	Stadium: Nikos Goumas Stadium; Attendance: 15,627; Referee: Giorgos Borovilos (Arcadia)

20 September 1992 3	Doxa Drama	1–3	AEK Athens	Drama
17:15 EEST (UTC+3)	Aleksić (yellow card); G. Georgiadis 25', (yellow card)		Šabanadžović (yellow card); Vasilopoulos (yellow card) 11'; Dimitriadis 44' (pen.); Papaioannou 62'; Manolas 64', (yellow card) 69'	Stadium: Doxa Drama Stadium; Attendance: 4,780; Referee: Kostas Adamopoulos (Athens)

26 September 1992 4	AEK Athens	2–1	Panachaiki	Nea Filadelfeia
16:00 EEST (UTC+3)	Ottiji 65' (o.g.); Stamatis 90+1'		Drakopoulos (yellow card); Genas (yellow card); Masouras (yellow card); Iliadis (yellow card); Ottiji 18'	Stadium: Nikos Goumas Stadium; Attendance: 7,644; Referee: Giannis Papageorgiou (Athens)

11 October 1992 5	OFI	1–1	AEK Athens	Heraklion
	Pavlopoulos (yellow card); Machlas 90'		Karagiannis (yellow card); Dimitriadis (yellow card); Vasilopoulos (yellow card); Manolas (yellow card); Alexandris 63'	Stadium: Theodoros Vardinogiannis Stadium; Attendance: 11,588; Referee: Giannis Dermetzoglou (Alexandroupoli)

17 October 1992 6	Pierikos	0–1	AEK Athens	Katerini
15:15 EEST (UTC+3)	Bekas (yellow card) 22'; Isiotis (yellow card) 60'		Agorogiannis (yellow card) 14'; Alexandris 47'; Manolas (yellow card) 78'; Slišković (yellow card) 80'; Patikas (yellow card) 83'	Stadium: Katerini Municipal Stadium; Attendance: 1,911; Referee: Alekos Arnakis (Thessaloniki)

25 October 1992 7	AEK Athens	2–1	AEL	Nea Filadelfeia
15:30 EET (UTC+2)	Šabanadžović (yellow card); Dimitriadis 70' (pen.); Alexandris 78', (yellow card)		Alexoulis (yellow card); Stoica (yellow card); Galitsios (yellow card); Issa 5'	Stadium: Nikos Goumas Stadium; Attendance: 13,305; Referee: Dimitris Bentas (Trikala)

31 October 1992 8	Skoda Xanthi	3–4	AEK Athens	Xanthi
15:15 EET (UTC+2)	Karametaxas (yellow card); Marcelo 12', 16'; Athanasiadis 50'		Karagiannis (yellow card); Manolas (yellow card); Agorogiannis (yellow card); Dimitriadis 6', 57'; Slišković 77', 89', (yellow card)	Stadium: A.O. Xanthi Stadium; Attendance: 6,417; Referee: Ilias Doutsias (Piraeus)

15 November 1992 9	AEK Athens	3–0	Ionikos	Nea Filadelfeia
15:00 EET (UTC+2)	Mitropoulos (yellow card); Dimitriadis 55'; Alexandris 72'; Savevski 78'		Daraklitsas (yellow card); Michos (yellow card); Vrachamis (yellow card)	Stadium: Nikos Goumas Stadium; Attendance: 11,549; Referee: Giannis Dermetzoglou (Alexandroupoli)

22 November 1992 10	Panathinaikos	1–1	AEK Athens	Marousi
15:00 EET (UTC+2)	Kalitzakis (yellow card); Frantzeskos (yellow card); Mavridis 34'		Karagiannis (yellow card); Savevski (yellow card); Alexandris 83'	Stadium: Olympic Stadium; Attendance: 40,217; Referee: Gerasimos Mazarakis (Kefalonia)

29 November 1992 11	AEK Athens	3–1	PAOK	Nea Filadelfeia
15:00 EET (UTC+2)	Karagiannis (yellow card) (yellow-red card) 68'; Dimitriadis 1' (pen.), 25', 41', (yellow card)		Alexiou (yellow card); Dermitzakis 63'; Plitsis (red card) 78'	Stadium: Nikos Goumas Stadium; Attendance: 19,220; Referee: Giorgos Plevritis (Thessaloniki)

6 December 1992 12	Apollon Athens	0–3	AEK Athens	Rizoupoli
15:00 EET (UTC+2)	Kefalas (yellow card); Velentzas (yellow card) 4'; Karasavvidis (yellow card) 35'		Šabanadžović (yellow card) 8'; Savevski (yellow card) 43', (goal) 83'; Dimitriadis 10', 48' (pen.), (yellow card) 76'	Stadium: Rizoupoli Stadium; Attendance: 8,513; Referee: Vasilis Krastanas (Thessaloniki)

12 December 1992 13	AEK Athens	7–0	Korinthos	Nea Filadelfeia
16:30 EET (UTC+2)	Dimitriadis 6', 75'; Slišković 12', 80'; Mitropoulos 15'; Tsiartas 47', 52'			Stadium: Nikos Goumas Stadium; Attendance: 6,939; Referee: Vassilios Nikakis (Aetoloacarnania)

19 December 1992 14	AEK Athens	2–0	Apollon Kalamarias	Nea Filadelfeia
15:00 EET (UTC+2)	Slišković (yellow card); Vasilopoulos (yellow card); Mitropoulos (yellow card); Dimitriadis 27'; Tsiartas 86'		Amanatidis (yellow card)	Stadium: Nikos Goumas Stadium; Attendance: 9,152; Referee: Naoum Mintiouris (Serres)

23 December 1992 15	Iraklis	1–1	AEK Athens	Thessaloniki
15:00 EET (UTC+2)	Skartados (yellow card) 16'; Sakellaridis (yellow card) 45'; Jovanović 50'		Šabanadžović (yellow card) 16'; Mitropoulos 24', (yellow card) 54'; Slišković (yellow card) 30'; Papadopoulos (yellow card) 59'	Stadium: Kaftanzoglio Stadium; Attendance: 4,171; Referee: Christos Zarzavatsakis (Athens)

3 January 1993 16	AEK Athens	1–0	Edessaikos	Nea Filadelfeia
15:00 EET (UTC+2)	Slišković 42'		Passalis (yellow card)	Stadium: Nikos Goumas Stadium; Attendance: 12,009; Referee: Alekos Arnakis (Thessaloniki)

10 January 1993 17	Olympiacos	1–0	AEK Athens	Piraeus
15:00 EET (UTC+2)	Lytovchenko (yellow card) 16'; Tsalouchidis (yellow card) 29'; Pachatouridis (yellow card) 37' (red card) 55'; Kalantzis 81'; Protasov (yellow card) 85'		Manolas (yellow card) 16'; Slišković (red card) 55'; Šabanadžović (yellow card) 59'	Stadium: Karaiskakis Stadium; Attendance: 29,979; Referee: Vasilis Kougios (Dodecanese)

17 January 1993 18	Aris	1–1	AEK Athens	Thessaloniki
15:00 EET (UTC+2)	Ivan (yellow card) 32'; Mitsopoulos (yellow card) 16'; Kolomitrousis 45' (pen.); Tsimpos (yellow card) 56'		Alexandris (yellow card) 16'; Dimitriadis 17' (pen.)	Stadium: Aris Stadium; Attendance: 7,938; Referee: Giorgos Xythalis (Arta)

23 January 1993 19	Athinaikos	0–0	AEK Athens	Vyronas
15:00 EET (UTC+2)	Anastasiou (yellow card); Chatziangelis (yellow card)		Šabanadžović (yellow card) 41'	Stadium: Vyronas National Stadium; Attendance: 3,516; Referee: Kostas Adamopoulos (Athens)

31 January 1993 20	AEK Athens	5–0	Doxa Drama	Nea Filadelfeia
15:00 EET (UTC+2)	Dimitriadis 19'; Slišković 45'; Alexandris 62'; Šabanadžović 74'; Koutoulas 82'		Kojičić (yellow card) 20'	Stadium: Nikos Goumas Stadium; Attendance: 10,203; Referee: Vasilis Krastanas (Thessaloniki)

6 February 1993 21	Panachaiki	0–0	AEK Athens	Patras
13:45 EET (UTC+2)	Savevski (yellow card); Karagiannis (yellow card); Minou (yellow card)		Mikes (yellow card); Zerdevas (yellow card)	Stadium: Kostas Davourlis Stadium; Attendance: 6,992; Referee: Stelios Charlavanis (Euboea)

20 February 1993 22	AEK Athens	3–2	OFI	Nea Filadelfeia
15:45 EET (UTC+2)	Mitropoulos 14', 39'; Koutoulas (yellow card) 45+1'; Dimitriadis 71' (pen.)		Nioplias 11' (pen.), 64' (pen.), (yellow card) 86'; Tsifoutis (yellow card) 17'; Goulis (yellow card) 45+1'; Marinakis (yellow card) 69'	Stadium: Nikos Goumas Stadium; Attendance: 9,940; Referee: Sotiris Vorgias (Athens)

28 February 1993 23	AEK Athens	3–1	Pierikos	Nea Filadelfeia
15:45 EET (UTC+2)	Dimitriadis 7'; Alexandris 21'; Slišković 42'		Ranđelović 16'	Stadium: Nikos Goumas Stadium; Attendance: 7,594; Referee: Thanasis Zachariadis (Thessaloniki)

7 March 1993 24	AEL	0–1	AEK Athens	Larissa
15:45 EET (UTC+2)	Alexoulis (yellow card) 11'; Providas (yellow card) 63'		Karagiannis (yellow card) (yellow-red card) 47'; Mitropoulos 64'; Agorogiannis (yellow card) 67'; Šabanadžović (yellow card) 67'	Stadium: Alcazar Stadium; Attendance: 9,844; Referee: Vassilios Nikakis (Aetoloacarnania)

14 March 1993 25	AEK Athens	3–1	Skoda Xanthi	Nea Filadelfeia
15:45 EET (UTC+2)	Stamatis 9'; Mitropoulos (yellow card) 42', (goal) 84'; Savevski 70'		Athanasiadis 11'; Konstantinidis (yellow card) 42'; Karageorgiou (yellow card) 63'	Stadium: Nikos Goumas Stadium; Attendance: 17,563; Referee: Giorgos Borovilos (Arcadia)

21 March 1993 26	Ionikos	4–3	AEK Athens	Nikaia
16:30 EET (UTC+2)	Filis (yellow card); Kourkounas (yellow card); Leontiadis (yellow card); Daraklitsas (yellow card); Mosimane (yellow card); Gribilas 6', (yellow card); Christodoulou 10'; Oistabasidis 18'; Mosimane 52'		Šabanadžović (yellow card); Savevski 34'; Alexandris 40'; Dimitriadis 68'	Stadium: Neapoli Municipal Stadium; Attendance: 5,666; Referee: Serafeim Skandalos (Athens)

4 April 1993 27	AEK Athens	3–1	Panathinaikos	Nea Filadelfeia
16:30 EEST (UTC+3)	Dimitriadis 1'; Kopitsis (yellow card) 4' (red card) 86', (goal) 86'; Tsiartas (yellow card) 6'; Manolas (yellow card) 14'; Alexandris 54'		Antoniou (yellow card) 28'; Frantzeskos (yellow card) 37'; G. Georgiadis (yellow card) 76'; Warzycha 78' (pen.); Kapouranis (yellow card) 83'	Stadium: Nikos Goumas Stadium; Attendance: 29,945; Referee: Spyros Kanoulis (Thessaly)

10 April 1993 28	PAOK	2–1	AEK Athens	Thessaloniki
16:30 EEST (UTC+3)	Lagonidis 54', 77'		Alexandris 52'; Papaioannou (yellow card) 58'	Stadium: Toumba Stadium; Attendance: 9,267; Referee: Christos Savvas (Kozani)

25 April 1993 29	AEK Athens	3–0	Apollon Athens	Nea Filadelfeia
17:00 EEST (UTC+3)	Karagiozopoulos (yellow card); Tsiartas (yellow card); Dimitriadis 50', 52', 90+1'		Katzenbach (yellow card); Apostolou (yellow card); Kondylis (yellow card)	Stadium: Nikos Goumas Stadium; Attendance: 14,564; Referee: Christos Zarzavatsakis (Athens)

2 May 1993 30	Korinthos	1–4	AEK Athens	Corinth
17:00 EEST (UTC+3)	Dimopoulos (yellow card) 44', (goal) 62'; Tzanavaras (yellow card) 51'; Inneh (yellow card) 76'		Alexandris 52', 56'; Slišković (yellow card) 74'; Dimitriadis 80', 87'; Papadopoulos (yellow card) 85'	Stadium: Korinthos Stadium; Attendance: 9,221; Referee: Savvas Chatzistavridis (Drama)

9 May 1993 31	Apollon Kalamarias	1–0	AEK Athens	Thessaloniki
17:00 EEST (UTC+3)	Samaras (yellow card) 44'; Tošić 55'; Semertzidis (yellow card) 61'; Tsouloukidis (yellow card) 66'		Karagiannis (yellow card) 8'	Stadium: Kalamaria Stadium; Attendance: 5,688; Referee: Giorgos Spaneas (Athens)

16 May 1993 32	AEK Athens	4–0	Iraklis	Nea Filadelfeia
17:00 EEST (UTC+3)	Alexandris 18'; Dimitriadis 36' (pen.), 86' (pen.); Papaioannou 42'; Mitropoulos (yellow card) 69' (yellow-red card) 83'		D. Papadopoulos (yellow card) 7'; Xenitopoulos (yellow card) 26'; C. Kostis (yellow card) 75'	Stadium: Nikos Goumas Stadium; Attendance: 25,189; Referee: Christos Zarzavatsakis (Athens)

30 May 1993 33	Edessaikos	0–1	AEK Athens	Edessa
17:30 EEST (UTC+3)	Kotsyfas (yellow card); Kolev (penalty missed) 13'		Agorogiannis (yellow card); Slišković (yellow card); Dimitriadis 62'	Stadium: Municipal Stadium of Edessa; Attendance: 6,753; Referee: Giannis Dermetzoglou (Alexandroupoli)

6 June 1993 34	AEK Athens	3–1	Olympiacos	Nea Filadelfeia
17:15 EEST (UTC+3)	Karagiannis (yellow card); Slišković 1'; Dimitriadis 4' (pen.), 74' (pen.)		Tsalouchidis 34'	Stadium: Nikos Goumas Stadium; Attendance: 27,459; Referee: Giannis Papageorgiou (Athens)

=== Greek Cup ===
==== Group 15 ====
Pos	Team	Pld	W	D	L	GF	GA	GD	Pts	Qualification	AEK	APA	PNA	POS
1	AEK Athens	3	2	1	0	10	3	+7	7	Round of 32		2–1	—	6–0
2	Apollon Athens	3	1	1	1	3	2	+1	4	Round of 32	—		0–0	2–0
3	Panargiakos	3	0	3	0	3	3	0	3		2–2	—		—
4	Poseidon Michaniona	3	0	1	2	1	9	−8	1		—	—	1–1	

Source: epo.gr

==== Matches ====
16 August 1992 1	Panargiakos	2–2	AEK Athens	Argos
17:30 EEST (UTC+3)	Karagiannis (yellow card); Agorogiannis 24'; Dimitriadis 44'; Stamatis (red card) 56'	Report	Liosis 1', (yellow card); Garagounis (yellow card); Douvikas 77'	Stadium: Argos Municipal Stadium; Attendance: 3,500; Referee: Giannis Latsios (Larissa)

19 August 1992 2	AEK Athens	2–1	Apollon Athens	Nea Filadelfeia
21:00 EEST (UTC+3)	Agorogiannis (yellow card); Papadopoulos (yellow card); Dimitriadis 56' (pen.); Alexandris 57', (yellow card)	Report	Kovačević 74'	Stadium: Nikos Goumas Stadium; Attendance: 4,029; Referee: Sotiris Vorgias (Athens)

23 August 1992 3	AEK Athens	6–0	Poseidon Michaniona	Nea Filadelfeia
17:30 EEST (UTC+3)	Dimitriadis 7', 46', 84'; Alexandris 19'; Papaioannou 22'; Šabanadžović (yellow card) 63', (goal) 73'	Report	Akladis (yellow card); Karavasilis (red card) 30'	Stadium: Nikos Goumas Stadium; Attendance: 2,539; Referee: Vasilis Krastanas (Thessaloniki)

===== Round of 32 =====
2 December 1992 First leg	AEK Athens	1–0	Ionikos	Nea Filadelfeia
14:45 EET (UTC+2)	Vasilopoulos (yellow card); Karagiozopoulos 63' (pen.)	Report	Bechlivanidis (yellow card); Chatzinikolaou (yellow card)	Stadium: Nikos Goumas Stadium; Attendance: 2,804; Referee: Vasilis Krastanas (Thessaloniki)

16 December 1992 Second leg	Ionikos	0–3 (0–4 agg.)	AEK Athens	Nikaia
14:00 EET (UTC+2)	Vamvakoulas (yellow card); Bechlivanidis (yellow card) (yellow-red card) 86'; Leontiadis (yellow card) 85'	Report	Šabanadžović (yellow card); Alexandris (yellow card); Dimitriadis 27'; Vasilopoulos 58'; Slišković 88'	Stadium: Neapoli Municipal Stadium; Attendance: 3,321; Referee: Giorgos Bikas (Chalkidiki)

===== Round of 16 =====
13 January 1993 First leg	Atromitos	1–1	AEK Athens	Peristeri
16:45 EET (UTC+2)	Macheras (yellow card); Papakostoulis (yellow card); Jevtović 39'	Report	Vasilopoulos (yellow card); Papadopoulos (yellow card); Alexandris 22'	Stadium: Peristeri Stadium; Referee: Naoum Mintiouris (Serres)

27 January 1993 Second leg	AEK Athens	2–1 (a.e.t.) (3–2 agg.)	Atromitos	Nea Filadelfeia
14:30 EET (UTC+2)	Slišković 71', 95'	Report	Juričić 59' (pen.); Desillas (red card) 61'	Stadium: Nikos Goumas Stadium; Attendance: 2,791; Referee: Alekos Arnakis (Thessaloniki)

===== Quarter-finals =====
10 February 1993 First leg	AEL	1–0	AEK Athens	Larissa
15:30 EET (UTC+2)	Galitsios (penalty missed) 6'; Stoica 89'	Report	Manolas (yellow card); Papadopoulos (yellow card); Slišković (yellow card)	Stadium: Alcazar Stadium; Attendance: 8,126; Referee: Dimitris Bentas (Trikala)

24 February 1993 Second leg	AEK Athens	3–1 (a.e.t.) (3–2 agg.)	AEL	Nea Filadelfeia
15:00 EET (UTC+2)	Dimitriadis 40', 117'; Papaioannou (yellow card) 42'; Mitropoulos 115'	Report	Tsoukalis (yellow card) 42', (goal) 91'; Galitsios (yellow card) 42'; Stoica (yellow card) 43' (yellow-red card) 45'	Stadium: Nikos Goumas Stadium; Referee: Naoum Mintiouris (Serres)

===== Semi-finals =====
24 March 1993 First leg	Olympiacos	1–0	AEK Athens	Piraeus
20:15 EET (UTC+2)	Vaitsis 74'	Report	Karagiozopoulos (yellow card) 58'; Karagiannis (yellow card) 59'; Manolas (yellow card) 68'; Mitropoulos (yellow card) 70'	Stadium: Karaiskakis Stadium; Attendance: 17,203; Referee: Sotiris Vorgias (Athens)

14 April 1993 Second leg	AEK Athens	3–2 (a.e.t.) (3–3(a) agg.)	Olympiacos	Nea Filadelfeia
21:00 EEST (UTC+3)	Dimitriadis 3', 111'; Alexandris (yellow card) 12', (goal) 114'; Manolas (yellow card) 25'; Karagiannis (yellow card) 86'	Report	Karataidis (yellow card) 10'; Batista (yellow card) 16', (goal) 108'; Tsalouchidis (yellow card) 19'; Mitsibonas 96' (pen.)	Stadium: Nikos Goumas Stadium; Attendance: 16,504; Referee: Giorgos Bikas (Chalkidiki)

=== Greek Super Cup ===
29 August 1992 Final	AEK Athens	1–3	Olympiacos	Marousi
21:00 EEST (UTC+3)	Alexandris 31'; Manolas (yellow card) 33'	Report	Pachatouridis (yellow card) 21'; Batista 34'; Karapialis (yellow card) 44', (goal) 60'; Tsalouchidis 54'	Stadium: Olympic Stadium; Attendance: 29,371; Referee: Vassilios Nikakis (Aetoloacarnania)

=== UEFA Champions League ===
==== First round ====
The draw for the first round was held on 15 July 1992.

16 September 1992 First leg	AEK Athens (Greece)	1–1	(Cyprus) APOEL	Athens, Greece
19:00 EEST (UTC+3)	Alexandris 42'; Manolas (yellow card) 45+2'; Karagiannis (yellow card) 60'	Report	Šapurić (yellow card) 1'; Sotiriou (yellow card) 28'; Ioannou (yellow card) 52'; Hadjiloukas 75'	Stadium: Nikos Goumas Stadium; Attendance: 14,794; Referee: Arie Frost (Israel)

30 September 1992 Second leg	APOEL (Cyprus)	2–2 (3–3(a) agg.)	(Greece) AEK Athens	Nicosia, Cyprus
19:30 EEST (UTC+3)	Hadjiloukas (yellow card) 14'; Gogić 77'; Fasouliotis 85'	Report	Šabanadžović (yellow card) 18', (goal) 30'; Dimitriadis (yellow card) 59'; Manolas (yellow card) 63'; Alexandris 70'	Stadium: Makario Stadium; Attendance: 18,000; Referee: Charles Agius (Malta)
Note: The official report states that the second goal of AEK at the 70th minute was scored by Dimitriadis, but in the highlights of the game it appears clearly that the scorer is Alexandris.

==== Second round ====
The draw for the first round was held on 2 October 1992.

21 October 1992 First leg	AEK Athens (Greece)	1–0	(Netherlands) PSV Eindhoven	Athens, Greece
18:00 EEST (UTC+3)	Šabanadžović (yellow card) 31'; Vasilopoulos (yellow card) 35'; Dimitriadis 53'; Agorogiannis (yellow card) 83'; Mitropoulos (yellow card) 90'; Savevski (yellow card) 90+2'	Report	Van Aerle (yellow card) 31'; Faber (yellow card) 57'	Stadium: Nikos Goumas Stadium; Attendance: 31,050; Referee: Hubert Forstinger (Austria)

4 November 1992 Second leg	PSV Eindhoven (Netherlands)	3–0 (3–1 agg.)	(Greece) AEK Athens	Eindhoven, Netherlands
21:15 EET (UTC+2)	Romário 5', 51', 84'; Faber (yellow card) 57'; Hoekstra (yellow card) 85'	Report	Vasilopoulos (yellow card) 17'; Papaioannou (yellow card) 77'; Manolas (yellow card) 85'	Stadium: Philips Stadion; Attendance: 26,500; Referee: Fabio Baldas (Italy)

== Statistics ==
=== Squad statistics ===
As of 6 June 1993

No.	Pos	Player	Alpha Ethniki		Greek Cup		Greek Super Cup		Champions League		Total	
No.	Pos	Player	Apps	Goals	Apps	Goals	Apps	Goals	Apps	Goals	Apps	Goals
Goalkeepers
—	GK	(Greece) Antonis Minou	34	0	8	0	0	0	4	0	46	0
—	GK	(Greece) Spyros Ikonomopoulos	0	0	0	0	0	0	0	0	0	0
—	GK	(Greece) Ilias Atmatsidis	0	0	3	0	1	0	0	0	4	0
Defenders
—	DF	(Greece) Takis Karagiozopoulos	9	0	4	1	0	0	0	0	13	1
—	DF	(Greece) Stelios Manolas	30	1	7	0	1	0	3	0	41	1
—	DF	(Greece) Christos Vasilopoulos	14	0	8	1	1	0	4	0	27	1
—	DF	(Greece) Georgios Agorogiannis	24	0	9	1	0	0	4	0	37	1
—	DF	(Greece) Georgios Koutoulas	9	1	7	0	0	0	1	0	17	1
—	DF	(Greece) Manolis Papadopoulos	21	0	10	0	0	0	1	0	32	0
—	DF	(Greece) Vaios Karagiannis	26	0	7	0	1	0	4	0	38	0
—	DF	(Greece) Charis Kopitsis	11	1	4	0	0	0	0	0	15	1
Midfielders
—	MF	(Greece) Tasos Mitropoulos	26	6	9	1	1	0	3	0	39	7
—	MF	(Greece) Pavlos Papaioannou	32	2	9	1	1	0	4	0	46	3
—	MF	(Greece) Lampros Georgiadis	1	0	3	0	0	0	0	0	4	0
—	MF	(North Macedonia) Toni Savevski	32	4	10	0	1	0	4	0	47	4
—	MF	(Republic of Bosnia and Herzegovina) Refik Šabanadžović	31	1	7	1	1	0	3	1	42	3
—	MF	(Greece) Stavros Stamatis	17	2	4	0	0	0	3	0	24	2
—	MF	(Greece) Vasilios Tsiartas	14	3	4	0	0	0	0	0	18	3
Forwards
—	FW	(Greece) Vasilis Dimitriadis	33	33	10	10	1	0	4	1	48	44
—	FW	(Croatia) Zoran Slišković	26	9	4	3	1	0	4	0	35	12
—	FW	(United States) Frank Klopas	8	0	1	0	0	0	0	0	9	0
—	FW	(Greece) Alexis Alexandris	31	14	10	4	1	1	4	2	46	21
—	FW	(Switzerland) Samouil Drakopulos	0	0	1	0	0	0	0	0	1	0
Left during Winter Transfer window
—	DF	(Greece) Georgios Theodoridis	1	0	2	0	0	0	0	0	3	0
—	MF	(Australia) Jim Patikas	6	0	0	0	1	0	1	0	8	0
—	MF	(Greece) Nikos Ladogiannis	0	0	0	0	0	0	0	0	0	0
—	FW	(Greece) Giorgos Kakousios	1	0	1	0	0	0	0	0	2	0

=== Goalscorers ===
As of 6 June 1993
The list is sorted by competition order when total goals are equal, then by position and then alphabetically by surname.

Rank	Pos.	Player	Alpha Ethniki	Greek Cup	Greek Super Cup	Champions League	Total
1	FW	(Greece) Vasilis Dimitriadis	33	10	0	1	44
2	FW	(Greece) Alexis Alexandris	14	4	1	2	21
3	FW	(Croatia) Zoran Slišković	9	3	0	0	12
4	MF	(Greece) Tasos Mitropoulos	6	1	0	0	7
5	MF	(North Macedonia) Toni Savevski	4	0	0	0	4
6	MF	(Greece) Vasilios Tsiartas	3	0	0	0	3
6	MF	(Greece) Pavlos Papaioannou	2	1	0	0	3
6	MF	(Bosnia and Herzegovina) Refik Šabanadžović	1	1	0	1	3
9	MF	(Greece) Stavros Stamatis	2	0	0	0	2
10	DF	(Greece) Stelios Manolas	1	0	0	0	1
10	DF	(Greece) Georgios Koutoulas	1	0	0	0	1
10	DF	(Greece) Takis Karagiozopoulos	0	1	0	0	1
10	DF	(Greece) Charis Kopitsis	1	0	0	0	1
10	DF	(Greece) Georgios Agorogiannis	0	1	0	0	1
10	DF	(Greece) Christos Vasilopoulos	0	1	0	0	1
Own goals			1	0	0	0	1
Totals			78	23	1	4	106

=== Hat-tricks ===
Numbers in superscript represent the goals that the player scored.

Player	Against	Result	Date	Competition	Source
(Greece) Vasilis Dimitriadis	(Greece) Poseidon Michaniona	6–0 (H)	23 August 1992	Greek Cup	
(Greece) Vasilis Dimitriadis	(Greece) Athinaikos	5–1 (H)	13 September 1992	Alpha Ethniki	
(Greece) Vasilis Dimitriadis	(Greece) PAOK	3–1 (H)	29 November 1992	Alpha Ethniki	
(Greece) Vasilis Dimitriadis	(Greece) Apollon Athens	3–0 (Η)	25 April 1993	Alpha Ethniki	

=== Assists ===
As of 6 June 1993
The list is sorted by competition order when total assists are equal, then by position and then alphabetically by surname.

Rank	Pos.	Player	Alpha Ethniki	Greek Cup	Greek Super Cup	Champions League	Total
1	MF	(North Macedonia) Toni Savevski	23	7	0	1	31
2	FW	(Greece) Alexis Alexandris	7	1	0	0	8
3	MF	(Greece) Tasos Mitropoulos	5	1	0	0	6
4	MF	(Greece) Vasilios Tsiartas	3	2	0	0	5
4	FW	(Greece) Vasilis Dimitriadis	2	2	0	1	5
6	MF	(Bosnia and Herzegovina) Refik Šabanadžović	3	1	0	0	4
7	MF	(Greece) Pavlos Papaioannou	3	0	0	0	3
7	DF	(Greece) Georgios Agorogiannis	2	1	0	0	3
9	DF	(Greece) Stelios Manolas	1	1	0	0	2
9	FW	(Croatia) Zoran Slišković	1	1	0	0	2
9	DF	(Greece) Christos Vasilopoulos	0	2	0	0	2
13	DF	(Greece) Georgios Koutoulas	1	0	0	0	1
13	DF	(Greece) Manolis Papadopoulos	1	0	0	0	1
13	DF	(Greece) Charis Kopitsis	1	0	0	0	1
13	DF	(Greece) Vaios Karagiannis	1	0	0	0	1
13	MF	(Australia) Jim Patikas	1	0	0	0	1
13	FW	(United States) Frank Klopas	1	0	0	0	1
13	MF	(Greece) Lampros Georgiadis	0	1	0	0	1
Totals			56	20	0	2	78

=== Clean sheets ===
As of 6 June 1993
The list is sorted by competition order when total clean sheets are equal and then alphabetically by surname. Clean sheets in games where both goalkeepers participated are awarded to the goalkeeper who started the game. Goalkeepers with no appearances are not included.

Rank	Player	Alpha Ethniki	Greek Cup	Greek Super Cup	Champions League	Total
1	(Greece) Antonis Minou	14	3	0	1	18
2	(Greece) Ilias Atmatsidis	0	0	0	0	0
Totals		14	3	0	1	18

=== Disciplinary record ===
As of 6 June 1993

N	P	Nat.	Name	Alpha Ethniki			Greek Cup			Greek Super Cup			Champions League			Total			Notes
N	P	Nat.	Name	Yellow card	Second yellow card	Red card	Yellow card	Second yellow card	Red card	Yellow card	Second yellow card	Red card	Yellow card	Second yellow card	Red card	Yellow card	Second yellow card	Red card	Notes
Goalkeepers
—	GK	(Greece)	Antonis Minou	1												1			
—	GK	(Greece)	Spyros Ikonomopoulos																
—	GK	(Greece)	Ilias Atmatsidis																
Defenders
—	DF	(Greece)	Takis Karagiozopoulos	1			1									2			
—	DF	(Greece)	Stelios Manolas	6			3			1			3			13			
—	DF	(Greece)	Christos Vasilopoulos	3			2						2			7			
—	DF	(Greece)	Georgios Agorogiannis	4			1						1			6			
—	DF	(Greece)	Georgios Koutoulas	1												1			
—	DF	(Greece)	Manolis Papadopoulos	2			3									5			
—	DF	(Greece)	Vaios Karagiannis	9	2		3						1			13	2		
—	DF	(Greece)	Charis Kopitsis	1												1			
Midfielders
—	MF	(Greece)	Tasos Mitropoulos	5	1		1						1			7	1		
—	MF	(Greece)	Pavlos Papaioannou	2			1						1			4			
—	MF	(Greece)	Lampros Georgiadis																
—	MF	(North Macedonia)	Toni Savevski	3									1			4			
—	MF	(Republic of Bosnia and Herzegovina)	Refik Šabanadžović	8			2						2			12			
—	MF	(Greece)	Stavros Stamatis						1									1	
—	MF	(Greece)	Vasilios Tsiartas	2												2			
Forwards
—	FW	(Greece)	Vasilis Dimitriadis	4									1			5			
—	FW	(Croatia)	Zoran Slišković	7		1	1									8		1	
—	FW	(United States)	Frank Klopas																
—	FW	(Greece)	Alexis Alexandris	2			3									5			
—	FW	(Switzerland)	Samouil Drakopulos																
Left during Winter Transfer window
—	DF	(Greece)	Georgios Theodoridis																
—	MF	(Australia)	Jim Patikas	1												1			
—	MF	(Greece)	Nikos Ladogiannis																
—	FW	(Greece)	Giorgos Kakousios																

=== Starting 11 ===
This section presents the most frequently used formation along with the players with the most starts across all competitions.

N.	Formation	Matchday(s)
50	4–2–1–3	1–34

Nat.	Player	Pos.
(Greece)	Antonis Minou	GK
(Greece)	Stelios Manolas	RCB
(Greece)	Manolis Papadopoulos	LCB
(Greece)	Pavlos Papaioannou (C)	RB
(Greece)	Vaios Karagiannis	LB
(Bosnia and Herzegovina)	Refik Šabanadžović	DM
(North Macedonia)	Toni Savevski	CM
(Greece)	Tasos Mitropoulos	AM
(Greece)	Alexis Alexandris	RW
(Croatia)	Zoran Slišković	LW
(Greece)	Vasilis Dimitriadis	CF

Last updated: 1993-06-06

== Awards ==
Player	Pos.	Award	Source
(Greece) Vasilis Dimitriadis	FW	Alpha Ethniki Top Scorer	
(Greece) Vasilis Dimitriadis	FW	Greek Cup Top Scorer	
(Greece) Stelios Manolas	DF	Greek Player of the Season	
(Bosnia and Herzegovina) Dušan Bajević	—	Foreign Manager of the Season	
