= A.E.K.–Olympiacos rivalry =

Football rivalry in Greece

AEK–Olympiacos rivalry
- Native name: Ντέρμπι AEK - Ολυμπιακού (Greek)
- Location: Nea Filadelfeia / Piraeus, Greece
- Teams: AEK Athens; Olympiacos
- First meeting: 22 February 1925; Friendly; Olympiacos 2–3 AEK Athens
- Latest meeting: 17 May 2026; Super League; AEK Athens 1–1 Olympiacos
- Next meeting: TBA
- Stadiums: Agia Sophia Stadium (AEK Athens); Karaiskakis Stadium (Olympiacos)

Statistics
- Most wins: Olympiacos (104)
- Top scorer: Thomas Mavros (16)
- Largest victory: Olympiacos 6–0 AEK Athens; 8 February 1981, 20 March 2011, 26 February 2025

The AEK–Olympiacos rivalry is a football local derby played between AEK Athens and Olympiacos. Both clubs are based in the Athens metropolitan area. AEK Athens comes from Nea Filadelfeia, a suburban town, while Olympiacos is based in the coastal city of Piraeus. The matches between the two teams are renowned for their strong on-pitch rivalry, they usually have high attendances, and most of them are very entertaining and very competitive with many goals scored by both sides.

== Statistics ==
=== Honours ===
AEK Athens	Competition	Olympiacos
Domestic
14	Super League Greece	48
16	Greek Cup	29
2	Greek Super Cup	5
1	Greek League Cup (defunct)	0
5	Athens FCA League (defunct)	—
—	Piraeus FCA League (defunct)	25
European
0	UEFA Conference League	1
0	Balkans Cup (defunct)	1
38	Total	109

=== Matches summary ===
Competition	Matches	Wins		Draws	Goals		Home wins		Home draws		Away wins		Other venue wins	
Competition	Matches	AEK	OSFP	Draws	AEK	OSFP	AEK	OSFP	AEK	OSFP	AEK	OSFP	AEK	OSFP
Super League Greece	175	47	83	45	162	278	27	51	28	17	19	32	1	0
Greek Cup	48	20	20	8	37	43	11	9	2	5	5	8	4	3
Greek Super Cup	1	0	1	0	1	3	–	–	–	–	–	–	0	1
Greek League Cup	1	1	0	0	3	2	–	–	–	–	–	–	1	0
Total	225	68	104	53	203	326	38	60	30	22	24	40	6	4

== Head-to-head ranking in Super League Greece ==
P.	60	61	62	63	64	65	66	67	68	69	70	71	72	73	74	75	76	77	78	79	80	81	82	83	84	85	86	87	88	89	90	91	92	93	94	95	96	97	98	99	00	01	02	03	04	05	06	07	08	09	10	11	12	13	14	15	16	17	18	19	20	21	22	23	24	25	26
1				1			1	1	1			1		1	1	1			1	1	1	1	1	1				1		1			1	1	1			1	1	1	1	1	1	1		1	1	1	1	1		1	1	1	1	1	1	1	1		1	1	1	1		1	1
2	2	2	2		2	2		2	2	2	2		2			2	2	2		2		2			2				2	2	2	2	2			2	2	2		2			2		2		2	2										2		2					2		2
3	3			3	3	3	3				3		3				3							3		3	3					3		3	3		3		3		3	3		3		3			3	3	3		3						3	3	3			3	3		
4		4	4															4	4		4		4			4					4														4							4					4					4				4	
5														5	5												5									5															5												5				
6										6																																																									
7												7													7			7																																							
8																													8																																						
9																																																																			
10																																																																			
11																																																																			
12																																																																			
13																																																																			
14																																																																			
15																																																						15													
16																																																																			
17																																																																			
18																																																																			
Super League 2
1																																																								1											
Gamma Ethniki
1																																																							1												

- Total: Olympiacos with 44 higher finishes, AEK Athens with 23 higher finishes.

== Matches list ==
=== Super League Greece ===
Season	AEK Athens – Olympiacos				Olympiacos – AEK Athens			
Season	Date	Venue	Atten.	Score	Date	Venue	Atten.	Score
Panhellenic Championship era (1927–1959)
1930–31	07–06–1931	Leoforos Alexandras Stadium	N/A	0–2	01–03–1931	Karaiskakis Stadium	N/A	3–1
1931–32	17–04–1932	Leoforos Alexandras Stadium	N/A	0–4	10–07–1932	Karaiskakis Stadium	N/A	4–0
1932–33	20–11–1932	Leoforos Alexandras Stadium	N/A	3–0	30–04–1933	Karaiskakis Stadium	N/A	3–0
1932–33	18–06–1933	Leoforos Alexandras Stadium	N/A	1–3	02–07–1933	Karaiskakis Stadium	N/A	2–0 (w/o)
1933–34	13–05–1934	Leoforos Alexandras Stadium	N/A	0–3	18–03–1934	Karaiskakis Stadium	N/A	4–0
1934–35	21–04–1935	Leoforos Alexandras Stadium	N/A	0–4	26–05–1935	Karaiskakis Stadium	N/A	2–2
1935–36	07–06–1936	Rouf Stadium	N/A	0–0	06–12–1935	Karaiskakis Stadium	N/A	2–0
1938–39	05–02–1939	Nikos Goumas Stadium	N/A	2–1	1939	Karaiskakis Stadium	N/A	5–1
1939–40	10–03–1940	Nikos Goumas Stadium	N/A	3–0	12–05–1940	Karaiskakis Stadium	N/A	3–2
1945–46	06–06–1946	Leoforos Alexandras Stadium	N/A	1–0	30–06–1946	Karaiskakis Stadium	N/A	0–0
1946–47	06–07–1947	Leoforos Alexandras Stadium	6,000	0–2	11–05–1947	Karaiskakis Stadium	10,000	2–3
1953–54	18–07–1954	Nikos Goumas Stadium	N/A	0–4	11–07–1954	Leoforos Alexandras Stadium	N/A	5–0
1958–59	01–06–1958	Nikos Goumas Stadium	20,000	0–1	23–02–1958	Karaiskakis Stadium	N/A	0–0
1958–59	15–03–1959	Nikos Goumas Stadium	15,692	1–2	21–06–1959	Karaiskakis Stadium	25,000	2–2
Alpha Ethniki era (1959–2006)
1959–60	10–01–1960	Nikos Goumas Stadium	20,000	1–0	06–12–1959	Karaiskakis Stadium	20,876	0–1
1960–61	04–06–1961	Nikos Goumas Stadium	28,268	4–1	18–12–1960	Karaiskakis Stadium	20,061	3–1
1961–62	01–10–1961	Nikos Goumas Stadium	26,000	0–0	25–02–1962	Karaiskakis Stadium	20,795	0–0
1962–63	26–05–1963	Nikos Goumas Stadium	29,344	2–2	23–12–1962	Karaiskakis Stadium	26,503	1–3
1963–64	22–09–1963	Nikos Goumas Stadium	35,000	0–2	01–04–1964	Nikos Goumas Stadium	34,912	3–0
1964–65	27–06–1965	Nikos Goumas Stadium	14,200	3–3	07–04–1965	Karaiskakis Stadium	42,415	1–2
1965–66	12–12–1965	Nikos Goumas Stadium	30,000	0–2	27–03–1966	Karaiskakis Stadium	40,600	4–0
1966–67	29–01–1967	Nikos Goumas Stadium	31,920	1–0	10–06–1967	Karaiskakis Stadium	33,445	1–1
1967–68	31–03–1968	Nikos Goumas Stadium	32,382	2–1	03–12–1967	Karaiskakis Stadium	33,000	1–4
1968–69	02–03–1969	Nikos Goumas Stadium	29,708	0–1	27–10–1968	Karaiskakis Stadium	36,589	2–3
1969–70	08–02–1970	Nikos Goumas Stadium	29,672	1–0	28–09–1969	Karaiskakis Stadium	36,300	2–1
1970–71	06–12–1970	Nikos Goumas Stadium	25,604	2–0	25–04–1971	Karaiskakis Stadium	37,000	2–0
1971–72	31–10–1971	Nikos Goumas Stadium	30,267	1–1	19–03–1972	Karaiskakis Stadium	38,376	1–1
1972–73	26–11–1972	Nikos Goumas Stadium	29,812	1–5	08–04–1973	Karaiskakis Stadium	41,049	2–0
1973–74	09–12–1973	Nikos Goumas Stadium	30,000	0–0	14–04–1974	Karaiskakis Stadium	25,548	4–0
1974–75	29–12–1974	Nikos Goumas Stadium	28,518	0–0	27–04–1975	Karaiskakis Stadium	39,173	3–0
1975–76	07–03–1976	Nikos Goumas Stadium	29,126	1–1	09–11–1975	Karaiskakis Stadium	38,778	0–2
1976–77	13–03–1977	Nikos Goumas Stadium	29,003	1–0	14–11–1976	Karaiskakis Stadium	39,138	2–0
1977–78	29–01–1978	Nikos Goumas Stadium	26,607	2–0	18–09–1977	Karaiskakis Stadium	37,868	1–0
1978–79	18–02–1979	Nikos Goumas Stadium	29,807	0–0	24–09–1978	Karaiskakis Stadium	38,934	0–1
1979–80	23–12–1979	Nikos Goumas Stadium	32,888	0–1	13–04–1980	Chalcis Municipal Stadium	14,500	0–0
1980–81	21–09–1980	Nikos Goumas Stadium	36,191	2–1	08–02–1981	Karaiskakis Stadium	35,450	6–0
1981–82	22–11–1981	Nikos Goumas Stadium	33,201	2–2	28–03–1982	Karaiskakis Stadium	35,450	2–2
1982–83	13–03–1983	Nikos Goumas Stadium	35,572	1–1	07–11–1982	Karaiskakis Stadium	28,362	1–1
1983–84	26–02–1984	Nikos Goumas Stadium	28,564	2–1	16–10–1983	Karaiskakis Stadium	34,023	1–0
1984–85	12–05–1985	Nikos Goumas Stadium	32,485	1–1	30–12–1984	Athens Olympic Stadium	72,153	0–1
1985–86	09–02–1986	Athens Olympic Stadium	74,465	0–0	29–09–1985	Athens Olympic Stadium	74,419	2–2
1986–87	02–11–1986	Athens Olympic Stadium	43,505	0–1	15–03–1987	Athens Olympic Stadium	43,678	2–0
1987–88	31–01–1988	Nikos Goumas Stadium	31,306	2–0	13–09–1987	Athens Olympic Stadium	72,047	2–2
1988–89	07–01–1989	Diagoras Stadium	4,503	1–2	07–05–1989	Athens Olympic Stadium	57,131	0–1
1989–90	22–10–1989	Nikos Goumas Stadium	26,096	0–0	04–03–1990	Karaiskakis Stadium	15,034	1–0
1990–91	06–02–1991	Diagoras Stadium	4,220	1–0 (Note: The original match was played on 13–01–1991 at Nikos Goumas Stadium. It was interrupted in the 84th minute due to tear gas use, while Olympiacos were leading by 1–2. A replay was decided.)	19–05–1991	Karaiskakis Stadium	23,226	3–1
1991–92	02–02–1992	Nikos Goumas Stadium	20,145	1–1	01–09–1991	Karaiskakis Stadium	30,248	4–2
1992–93	06–06–1993	Nikos Goumas Stadium	27,459	3–1	10–01–1993	Karaiskakis Stadium	29,979	1–0
1993–94	01–12–1993	Nikos Goumas Stadium	10,449	1–2 (Note: The original match was played on 24–10–1993. It was interrupted in the 85th minute due to a power cut at Nikos Goumas Stadium, while the score was 1–1. A replay was decided.)	26–02–1994	Karaiskakis Stadium	24,575	3–0
1994–95	01–04–1995	Nikos Goumas Stadium	12,317	2–2	19–11–1994	Karaiskakis Stadium	16,354	0–1
1995–96	28–10–1995	Nikos Goumas Stadium	14,943	1–1	17–03–1996	Karaiskakis Stadium	16,246	1–1
1996–97	13–01–1997	Nikos Goumas Stadium	23,248	2–0	11–05–1997	Karaiskakis Stadium	23,032	2–0
1997–98	02–02–1998	Nikos Goumas Stadium	22,378	1–0	22–09–1997	Athens Olympic Stadium	31,470	0–1
1998–99	31–01–1999	Nikos Goumas Stadium	19,026	2–0	30–05–1999	Athens Olympic Stadium	20,333	0–0
1999–2000	15–11–1999	Nikos Goumas Stadium	Cl. doors	0–2	12–03–2000	Athens Olympic Stadium	14,121	3–0
2000–01	26–02–2001	Theodoros Vardinogiannis Stadium	4,836	1–2	04–11–2000	Athens Olympic Stadium	26,138	4–1
2001–02	20–01–2002	Nikos Goumas Stadium	18,151	2–3	20–04–2002	Athens Olympic Stadium	60,292	4–3
2002–03	09–11–2002	Nikos Goumas Stadium	9,039	1–1	09–03–2003	Georgios Kamaras Stadium	9,563	1–2
2003–04	26–10–2003	Nea Smyrni Stadium	8,310	0–1	14–03–2004	Georgios Kamaras Stadium	11,311	0–1
2004–05	07–11–2004	Athens Olympic Stadium	63,129	0–0	13–03–2005	Karaiskakis Stadium	Cl. doors	1–1
2005–06	02–10–2005	Athens Olympic Stadium	34,842	1–3	19–02–2006	Karaiskakis Stadium	31,115	3–0
Super League era (2006–present)
2006–07	04–02–2007	Athens Olympic Stadium	36,122	3–3	23–09–2006	Karaiskakis Stadium	29,101	1–0
2007–08	30–03–2008	Athens Olympic Stadium	40,955	4–0	16–12–2007	Karaiskakis Stadium	30,229	1–0
2008–09	01–02–2009	Athens Olympic Stadium	44,104	0–1	05–10–2008	Karaiskakis Stadium	30,074	2–0
2009–10	23–09–2009	Athens Olympic Stadium	34,553	1–2	06–01–2010	Karaiskakis Stadium	27,789	1–2
2010–11	27–11–2010	Athens Olympic Stadium	24,980	1–0	20–03–2011	Karaiskakis Stadium	27,880	6–0
2011–12	15–10–2011	Athens Olympic Stadium	18,611	1–1	10–02–2012	Karaiskakis Stadium	28,057	2–0
2012–13	11–11–2012	Athens Olympic Stadium	15,272	0–4	10–03–2013	Karaiskakis Stadium	30,293	3–0
2015–16	14–02–2016	Athens Olympic Stadium	31,121	1–0	17–10–2015	Karaiskakis Stadium	30,056	4–0
2016–17	19–02-2017	Athens Olympic Stadium	28,046	1–0	02–10–2016	Karaiskakis Stadium	24,175	3–0
2017–18	24–09-2017	Athens Olympic Stadium	25,156	3–2	04–02–2018	Karaiskakis Stadium	31,231	1–2
2018–19	07–10–2018	Athens Olympic Stadium	27,419	1–1	17–02–2019	Karaiskakis Stadium	29,010	4–1
2019–20	26–01–2020	Athens Olympic Stadium	23,741	0–0	27–10–2019	Karaiskakis Stadium	31,157	2–0
2020–21	16–12–2020	Athens Olympic Stadium	Cl. doors	1–1	03–01–2021	Karaiskakis Stadium	Cl. doors	3–0
2021–22	21–11–2021	Athens Olympic Stadium	28,883	2–3	13–02–2022	Karaiskakis Stadium	Cl. doors	1–0
2022–23	12–03–2023	Agia Sophia Stadium	31,100	1–3	13–11–2022	Karaiskakis Stadium	31,717	0–0
2023–24	17–09–2023	Agia Sophia Stadium	29,421	1–1	07–01–2024	Karaiskakis Stadium	Cl. doors	1–2
2024–25	02–03–2025	Agia Sophia Stadium	30,663	0–1	24–11–2024	Karaiskakis Stadium	32,353	4–1
2025–26	01–02–2026	Agia Sophia Stadium	31,100	1–1	26–10–2025	Karaiskakis Stadium	32,930	2–0

=== Play-off match ===
Season	AEK Athens – Olympiacos				Olympiacos – AEK Athens			
Season	Date	Venue	Atten.	Score	Date	Venue	Atten.	Score
1978–79	16–06–1979	Leoforos Alexandras Stadium	5,000	2–0 (w/o) (Note: Olympiacos didn't show up in the match, so AEK was declared winner and were awarded the Championship by the HFF.)				
2009–10	19–05–2010	Athens Olympic Stadium	14,738	2–1	02–05–2010	Karaiskakis Stadium	18,697	2–1
2019–20	28–06–2020	Athens Olympic Stadium	Cl. doors	1–2	19–07–2020	Karaiskakis Stadium	Cl. doors	3–0
2020–21	04–04–2021	Athens Olympic Stadium	Cl. doors	1–5	25–04–2021	Karaiskakis Stadium	Cl. doors	2–0
2021–22	17–05–2022	Athens Olympic Stadium	Cl. doors	2–3	03–04–2022	Karaiskakis Stadium	Cl. doors	1–1
2022–23	03–05–2023	Agia Sophia Stadium	31,100	0–0	23–04–2023	Karaiskakis Stadium	25,015	1–3
2023–24	31–03–2024	Agia Sophia Stadium	31,100	1–0	15–05–2024	Karaiskakis Stadium	30,020	2–0
2024–25	27–04–2025	Agia Sophia Stadium	22,152	0–2	13–04–2025	Karaiskakis Stadium	32,600	1–0
2025–26	17–05–2026	Agia Sophia Stadium	31,100	1–1	05–04–2026	Karaiskakis Stadium	32,850	0–1

=== Greek Cup ===
Season	Round	AEK Athens – Olympiacos				Olympiacos – AEK Athens				Winner
Season	Round	Date	Venue	Atten.	Score	Date	Venue	Atten.	Score	Winner
1938–39	Semi-finals					14–05–1939	Karaiskakis Stadium	N/A	0–2 (w/o) (Note: Match suspended at 40th minute, while the score was 1–2. AEK were awarded a 0–2 win.)	AEK
1947–48	Semi-finals	30–05–1948	Leoforos Alexandras Stadium	10,000	1–0					AEK
1948–49	Semi-finals	10–04–1949	Leoforos Alexandras Stadium	16,000	2–1					AEK
1949–50	Round of 16	08–03–1950	Nikos Goumas Stadium	N/A	2–0 (Note: Replay match)	29–01–1950	Karaiskakis Stadium	12,000	0–0 (a.e.t.)	AEK
1951–52	Semi-finals	27–04–1952	Nikos Goumas Stadium	N/A	0–2					OSFP
1952–53	Final					17–05–1953	Leoforos Alexandras Stadium	25,000	3–2	OSFP
1955–56	Final	24–06–1956	Leoforos Alexandras Stadium	25,000	2–1					AEK
1956–57	Quarter-finals	25–08–1957	Nikos Goumas Stadium	N/A	0–1					OSFP
1957–58	Quarter-finals					13–07–1958	Karaiskakis Stadium	15,000	2–1	OSFP
1958–59	Quarter-finals	24–05–1959	Nikos Goumas Stadium	18,000	2–2 (a.e.t.)	27–05–1959	Karaiskakis Stadium	20,000	3–1 (Note: Replay match)	OSFP
1964–65	Quarter-finals					02–07–1965	Karaiskakis Stadium	45,000	3–1	OSFP
1965–66	Final					10–07–1966	Karaiskakis Stadium	—	0–2 (w/o) (Note: Olympiacos didn't show up in the final, so AEK was declared the winner and was awarded the cup by the HFF.)	AEK
1967–68	Semi-finals					14–07–1968	Karaiskakis Stadium	30,000	2–1	OSFP
1975–76	Semi-finals	12–05–1976	Nikos Goumas Stadium	30,000	2–3					OSFP
1977–78	Semi-finals	17–05–1978	Nikos Goumas Stadium	30,000	6–1					AEK
1982–83	Quarter-finals	18–05–1983	Nikos Goumas Stadium	28,000	2–1	01–06–1983	Karaiskakis Stadium	35,313	0–1	AEK
1987–88	Round of 16	10–02–1988	Nikos Goumas Stadium	23,929	1–3	27–01–1988	Karaiskakis Stadium	33,373	1–1	OSFP
1992–93	Semi-finals	14–04–1993	Nikos Goumas Stadium	16,504	3–2 (a.e.t.)	24–03–1993	Karaiskakis Stadium	17,203	1–0	OSFP
1995–96	Round of 16	17–01–1996	Nikos Goumas Stadium	7,234	1–1	03–01–1996	Athens Olympic Stadium	24,585	1–3	AEK
1996–97	Semi-finals	12–02–1997	Nikos Goumas Stadium	14,806	2–1	26–02–1997	Karaiskakis Stadium	25,955	0–1	AEK
1999–2000	Quarter-finals	08–03–2000	Nikos Goumas Stadium	14,400	3–0	16–02–2000	Athens Olympic Stadium	23,632	1–1	AEK
2000–01	Round of 16	10–01–2001	Nikos Goumas Stadium	14,062	0–2 (w/o) (Note: Match suspended at 69th minute, while the score was 1–1. Olympiacos were awarded a 0–2 win.)	24–01–2001	Athens Olympic Stadium	11,925	6–1	OSFP
2001–02	Final					27–04–2002	Athens Olympic Stadium	45,218	1–2	AEK
2004–05	Semi-finals	20–04–2005	Athens Olympic Stadium	29,851	0–1	27–04–2005	Karaiskakis Stadium	27,441	2–1 (a.e.t.)	OSFP
2005–06	Final					10–05–2006	Pankritio Stadium	22,079	3–0	OSFP
2008–09	Final	02–05–2009	Athens Olympic Stadium	48,594	4–4 (14–15 p)					OSFP
2014–15	Quarter-finals	11–03–2015	Athens Olympic Stadium	64,256	0–3 (w/o) (Note: Match suspended at 90th minute (score: 0–1). Olympiacos were awarded a 0–3 win.)	11–02–2015	Karaiskakis Stadium	30,000	1–1	OSFP
2015–16	Final					17–05–2016	Athens Olympic Stadium	Cl. doors	1–2	AEK
2016–17	Semi-finals	26–04–2017	Athens Olympic Stadium	33,512	0–1	13–04–2017	Karaiskakis Stadium	Cl. doors	1–2	AEK
2017–18	Quarter-finals	07–02–2018	Athens Olympic Stadium	22,052	2–1	24–01–2018	Karaiskakis Stadium	30,000	0–0	AEK
2019–20	Final	12–09–2020	Panthessaliko Stadium	Cl. doors	0–1					OSFP
2022–23	Semi-finals	09–02–2023	Agia Sophia Stadium	31,100	3–0	12–04–2023	Karaiskakis Stadium	Cl. doors	2–1	AEK
2024–25	Semi-finals	02–04–2025	Agia Sophia Stadium		2–0	26–02–2025	Karaiskakis Stadium	N/A	6–0	OSFP

=== Greek League Cup ===
Season	Round	Date	Venue	Atten.	Score	Winner
1989–90	Final	02–06–1990	Athens Olympic Stadium	22,289	3–2	AEK

=== Greek Super Cup ===
Season	Date	Venue	Atten.	Score
1992–93	29–08–1992	Athens Olympic Stadium	29,371	1–3

=== Friendly matches ===
Date	Venue	Match	Score
22–02–1925	Velodrome	Olympiacos - AEK Athens	2–3
09–05–1926	Goudi Stadium	AEK Athens - Olympiacos	0–0
13–06–1926	Leoforos Alexandras Stadium	Olympiacos - AEK Athens	5–2
03–07–1927	Panellinios Stadium	Olympiacos - AEK Athens	6–2
01–04–1928	Leoforos Alexandras Stadium	Olympiacos - AEK Athens	3–1
15–04–1928	Leoforos Alexandras Stadium	Olympiacos - AEK Athens	4–1
30–12–1928	Leoforos Alexandras Stadium	Olympiacos - AEK Athens	4–3
07–05–1929	Leoforos Alexandras Stadium	Olympiacos - AEK Athens	3–2
06–01–1930	Leoforos Alexandras Stadium	Olympiacos - AEK Athens	6–3
11–05–1930	Velodrome	Olympiacos - AEK Athens	1–0
02–11–1930	Nikos Goumas Stadium	AEK Athens - Olympiacos	2–2
01–11–1931	Velodrome	Olympiacos - AEK Athens	2–1
24–01–1932	Leoforos Alexandras Stadium	Olympiacos - AEK Athens	3–1
14–09–1932	Velodrome	Olympiacos - AEK Athens	6–0
23–10–1932	Leoforos Alexandras Stadium	Olympiacos - AEK Athens	0–0
10–04–1934	Velodrome	Olympiacos - AEK Athens	2–1
16–06–1935	Velodrome	Olympiacos - AEK Athens	5–2
01–03–1936	Velodrome	Olympiacos - AEK Athens	3–2
11–10–1936	Velodrome	Olympiacos - AEK Athens	2–1
01–11–1936	Velodrome	Olympiacos - AEK Athens	1–0
06–01–1937	Leoforos Alexandras Stadium	Olympiacos - AEK Athens	2–2
16–05–1937	Velodrome	Olympiacos - AEK Athens	2–2
26–10–1937	Velodrome	Olympiacos - AEK Athens	0–2
26–04–1938	Velodrome	Olympiacos - AEK Athens	0–1
22–05–1938	Leoforos Alexandras Stadium	Olympiacos - AEK Athens	0–1
30–07–1939	Leoforos Alexandras Stadium	Olympiacos - AEK Athens	0–2
28–04–1940	Karaiskakis Stadium	Olympiacos - AEK Athens	5–2
29–09–1940	Nikos Goumas Stadium	AEK Athens - Olympiacos	7–3
14–02–1943	Kaisariani Stadium	Olympiacos - AEK Athens	0–2
08–05–1943	Leoforos Alexandras Stadium	Olympiacos - AEK Athens	2–1
19–06–1943	Karaiskakis Stadium	Olympiacos - AEK Athens	2–1
09–01–1944	Leoforos Alexandras Stadium	AEK Athens - Olympiacos	1–0
13–04–1944	Leoforos Alexandras Stadium	Olympiacos - AEK Athens	2–0
04–05–1944	Leoforos Alexandras Stadium	Olympiacos - AEK Athens	2–4
26–06–1944	Leoforos Alexandras Stadium	Olympiacos - AEK Athens	3–3
15–03–1945	Leoforos Alexandras Stadium	Olympiacos - AEK Athens	6–1
07–05–1945	Leoforos Alexandras Stadium	Olympiacos - AEK Athens	3–1
21–06–1945	Leoforos Alexandras Stadium	Olympiacos - AEK Athens	1–1
04–07–1945	Leoforos Alexandras Stadium	Olympiacos - AEK Athens	3–3

Date	Venue	Match	Score
30–12–1945	Karaiskakis Stadium	Olympiacos - AEK Athens	1–3
28–04–1946	Leoforos Alexandras Stadium	Olympiacos - AEK Athens	1–0
25–12–1946	Leoforos Alexandras Stadium	AEK Athens - Olympiacos	3–0
01–01–1947	Karaiskakis Stadium	Olympiacos - AEK Athens	1–1
22–03–1947	Leoforos Alexandras Stadium	Olympiacos - AEK Athens	3–2
14–04–1947	Leoforos Alexandras Stadium	Olympiacos - AEK Athens	2–2
26–12–1947	Leoforos Alexandras Stadium	Olympiacos - AEK Athens	4–1
04–01–1948	Leoforos Alexandras Stadium	AEK Athens - Olympiacos	1–2
07–11–1948	Leoforos Alexandras Stadium	Olympiacos - AEK Athens	4–0
26–12–1948	Leoforos Alexandras Stadium	Olympiacos - AEK Athens	1–1
25–04–1949	Leoforos Alexandras Stadium	Olympiacos - AEK Athens	3–0
27–12–1949	Leoforos Alexandras Stadium	Olympiacos - AEK Athens	1–0
08–01–1950	Leoforos Alexandras Stadium	Olympiacos - AEK Athens	2–2
24–09–1950	Leoforos Alexandras Stadium	Olympiacos - AEK Athens	2–1
26–12–1950	Leoforos Alexandras Stadium	Olympiacos - AEK Athens	1–3
30–04–1951	Karaiskakis Stadium	Olympiacos - AEK Athens	3–1
01–08–1951	Leoforos Alexandras Stadium	Olympiacos - AEK Athens	4–2
30–12–1951	Leoforos Alexandras Stadium	Olympiacos - AEK Athens	2–0
21–04–1952	Leoforos Alexandras Stadium	Olympiacos - AEK Athens	1–3
17–09–1952	Leoforos Alexandras Stadium	Olympiacos - AEK Athens	2–3
29–12–1952	Leoforos Alexandras Stadium	Olympiacos - AEK Athens	4–3
12–04–1953	Leoforos Alexandras Stadium	Olympiacos - AEK Athens	3–1
27–09–1953	Leoforos Alexandras Stadium	Olympiacos - AEK Athens	0–1
27–12–1953	Leoforos Alexandras Stadium	Olympiacos - AEK Athens	3–1
27–04–1954	Leoforos Alexandras Stadium	Olympiacos - AEK Athens	1–1
26–09–1954	Leoforos Alexandras Stadium	Olympiacos - AEK Athens	2–0
07–01–1955	Leoforos Alexandras Stadium	Olympiacos - AEK Athens	2–1
18–04–1955	Leoforos Alexandras Stadium	Olympiacos - AEK Athens	0–1
08–06–1955	Nikos Goumas Stadium	AEK Athens - Olympiacos	1–2
31–08–1955	Leoforos Alexandras Stadium	Olympiacos - AEK Athens	1–2
25–12–1955	Leoforos Alexandras Stadium	Olympiacos - AEK Athens	2–0
02–05–1956	Leoforos Alexandras Stadium	Olympiacos - AEK Athens	1–1
02–09–1956	Leoforos Alexandras Stadium	Olympiacos - AEK Athens	2–1
25–12–1956	Karaiskakis Stadium	Olympiacos - AEK Athens	1–1
18–04–1957	Leoforos Alexandras Stadium	Olympiacos - AEK Athens	4–4
25–12–1957	Leoforos Alexandras Stadium	Olympiacos - AEK Athens	1–1
20–04–1958	Leoforos Alexandras Stadium	Olympiacos - AEK Athens	1–1
25–12–1958	Leoforos Alexandras Stadium	Olympiacos - AEK Athens	4–2
10–05–1959	Nikos Goumas Stadium	AEK Athens - Olympiacos	2–3

Date	Venue	Match	Score
07–10–1959	Karaiskakis Stadium	Olympiacos - AEK Athens	1–0
03–01–1960	Karaiskakis Stadium	Olympiacos - AEK Athens	2–2
01–01–1961	Nikos Goumas Stadium	AEK Athens - Olympiacos	3–5
25–03–1962	Nikos Goumas Stadium	Olympiacos - AEK Athens	2–1
14–04–1963	Karaiskakis Stadium	Olympiacos - AEK Athens	7–1
08–09–1963	Nikos Goumas Stadium	AEK Athens - Olympiacos	3–2
06–11–1963	Nikos Goumas Stadium	AEK Athens - Olympiacos	1–0
06–01–1964	Nikos Goumas Stadium	AEK Athens - Olympiacos	6–1
05–05–1964	Karaiskakis Stadium	Olympiacos - AEK Athens	2–2
13–10–1968	Karaiskakis Stadium	Olympiacos - AEK Athens	3–0
30–06–1971	Karaiskakis Stadium	Olympiacos - AEK Athens	2–2
09–08–1971	Nikos Goumas Stadium	AEK Athens - Olympiacos	1–1
04–09–1971	Nikos Goumas Stadium	AEK Athens - Olympiacos	1–1
07–05–1972	Karaiskakis Stadium	Olympiacos - AEK Athens	3–1
26–08–1972	Karaiskakis Stadium	Olympiacos - AEK Athens	2–0
06–09–1974	Nikos Goumas Stadium	AEK Athens - Olympiacos	0–1
22–09–1974	Nikos Goumas Stadium	AEK Athens - Olympiacos	0–1
31–08–1975	Karaiskakis Stadium	Olympiacos - AEK Athens	0–0
08–09–1976	Nikos Goumas Stadium	AEK Athens - Olympiacos	1–2
21–08–1977	Karaiskakis Stadium	Olympiacos - AEK Athens	1–2
28–12–1977	Nikos Goumas Stadium	AEK Athens - Olympiacos	2–1
23–08–1981	Nikos Goumas Stadium	AEK Athens - Olympiacos	2–2
23–08–1982	Nikos Goumas Stadium	AEK Athens - Olympiacos	2–2
03–09–1984	Athens Olympic Stadium	Olympiacos - AEK Athens	1–2
21–08–1985	Athens Olympic Stadium	AEK Athens - Olympiacos	1–1
25–08–1986	Athens Olympic Stadium	AEK Athens - Olympiacos	1–1
23–08–1989	Nikos Goumas Stadium	AEK Athens - Olympiacos	2–2
20–08–1990	Nikos Goumas Stadium	AEK Athens - Olympiacos	1–1
09–08–1993	Karaiskakis Stadium	Olympiacos - AEK Athens	1–1

== Top scorers ==
Rank	Player	Club	League	Greek Cup	Super Cup	League Cup	Total
1	(Greece) Thomas Mavros	AEK Athens	10	6	0	0	16
2	(Greece) Mimis Papaioannou	AEK Athens	14	0	0	0	14
3	(Serbia) Predrag Đorđević	Olympiacos	11	1	0	0	12
4	(Greece) Giannis Vazos	Olympiacos	11	0	0	0	11
4	(Greece) Giorgos Sideris	Olympiacos	8	3	0	0	11
4	(Greece) Daniel Batista	Both clubs	5	5	1	0	11
7	(Greece) Demis Nikolaidis	AEK Athens	7	3	0	0	10
8	(Morocco) Youssef El-Arabi	Olympiacos	9	0	0	0	9
8	(Greece) Alexis Alexandris	Both clubs	4	4	1	0	9
10	(Greece) Kostas Nestoridis	AEK Athens	6	2	0	0	8
11	(Morocco) Ayoub El Kaabi	Olympiacos	6	1	0	0	7
11	(Greece) Kleanthis Maropoulos	AEK Athens	4	3	0	0	7
11	(Greece) Elias Yfantis	Olympiacos	3	4	0	0	7
14	(Greece) Kostas Fortounis	Olympiacos	6	0	0	0	6
14	(Greece) Vasilios Tsiartas	AEK Athens	5	1	0	0	6
14	(Greece) Vasilis Dimitriadis	AEK Athens	4	2	0	0	6
14	(Greece) Maik Galakos	Olympiacos	4	2	0	0	6
14	(Brazil) Giovanni	Olympiacos	3	3	0	0	6
19	(France) Yves Triantafyllos	Olympiacos	5	0	0	0	5
19	(Ukraine) Oleh Protasov	Olympiacos	5	0	0	0	5
19	(Guinea) Mady Camara	Olympiacos	5	0	0	0	5
19	(Greece) Nikos Anastopoulos	Olympiacos	4	1	0	0	5
19	(Argentina) Ismael Blanco	AEK Athens	3	2	0	0	5
19	(Argentina) Sergio Araujo	AEK Athens	3	2	0	0	5
19	(Trinidad and Tobago) Levi García	AEK Athens	3	2	0	0	5

== Personnel at both clubs ==
=== Players ===
From Olympiacos to AEK Athens

- 1948: (Greece) Napoleon Tavlas
- 1977: (Uruguay) Milton Viera
- 1980: (Greece) Petros Karavitis
- 1982: (Greece) Christos Arvanitis (Note: Returned to Olympiacos in 1985 after joining AEK for 3 seasons.)
- 1992: (Greece) Tasos Mitropoulos
- 1992: (Greece) Manolis Papadopoulos (via Ionikos)
- 1993: (Greece) Michalis Vlachos
- 2002: (Greece) Grigoris Georgatos (via Internazionale) (Note: Returned to Olympiacos in 2003 after joining AEK for 1 and a half seasons.)
- 2002: (Serbia) Ilija Ivić (via Torino and Aris)
- 2003: (Ghana) Kofi Amponsah (via PAOK)
- 2004: (Greece) Stavros Tziortziopoulos (via Akratitos and Panionios)
- 2004: (Greece) Christos Kontis (via Panionios)
- 2007: (Greece) Charilaos Pappas
- 2007: (Brazil) Rivaldo
- 2007: (Greece) Pantelis Kafes
- 2010: (Greece) Christos Patsatzoglou (via Omonia)
- 2012: (Greece) Konstantinos Kotsaridis
- 2013: (Brazil) Alexandre D'Acol (via Panionios, Kallithea and Thrasyvoulos)
- 2014: (Greece) Vasilios Lampropoulos (via Asteras Tripolis, Ethnikos Asteras and Panionios)
- 2014: (Greece) Aristidis Soiledis (via Doxa Drama and Niki Volos)
- 2018: (Greece) Giannis Gianniotas
- 2020: (Iran) Karim Ansarifard (via Nottingham Forest and Al-Sailiya)
- 2021: (Iran) Ehsan Hajsafi (via Tractor and Sepahan)
- 2026: (Greece) Charalampos Lykogiannis (via Sturm Graz, Cagliari and Bologna)

AEK Athens to Olympiacos

- 1941: (Greece) Aristidis Louvaris (via Thiseas Piraeus)
- 1944: (Greece) Alekos Chatzistavridis
- 1978: (Greece) Stefanos Theodoridis
- 1979: (Greece) Takis Nikoloudis (Note: Returned to AEK in 1982 after joining Olympiacos for 3 and a half seasons.)
- 1980: (Greece) Aris Damianidis
- 1987: (Sweden) Håkan Sandberg
- 1992: (Greece) (Cape Verde) Daniel Batista (Note: Returned to AEK in 1995 after joining Olympiacos for 3 seasons.)
- 1994: (Greece) Alexis Alexandris
- 1996: (Bosnia and Herzegovina) Refik Šabanadžović
- 2004: (Cyprus) Ioannis Okkas
- 2004: (United States) Peter Philipakos
- 2005: (Greece) Michalis Kapsis (via Bordeaux)
- 2010: (Hungary) Krisztián Németh
- 2011: (Algeria) Rafik Djebbour (Note: Returned to AEK in 2015 after joining Olympiacos for 2 seasons.)
- 2012: (Greece) Kostas Manolas
- 2013: (Greece) Konstantinos Vlachos
- 2017: (Greece) Panagiotis Tachtsidis (via Genoa, Roma, Catania and Torino)
- 2018: (Greece) Lazaros Christodoulopoulos
- 2020: (Greece) Alexandros Nikolias (via Glyfada, Olympiacos Volos and PAS Giannina)
- 2021: (Greece) Sokratis Papastathopoulos (via Genoa, AC Milan, Werder Bremen, Borussia Dortmund and Arsenal)

=== Managers ===
- (Greece) Themos Asderis
  - AEK Athens: 1932–1933, 1936–1937
  - Olympiacos: 1945–1947
- (Greece) Kostas Negrepontis
  - AEK Athens: 1933–1936, 1937–1948, 1955–1957, 1958–1959
  - Olympiacos: 1953–1954
- (Socialist Federal Republic of Yugoslavia) Todor Veselinović
  - Olympiacos: 1977–1980
  - AEK Athens: 1987–1988
- (Austria) Helmut Senekowitsch
  - Olympiacos: 1981
  - AEK Athens: 1983, 1983–1984
- (Greece) Miltos Papapostolou
  - AEK Athens: 1980–1981
  - Olympiacos: 1989
- (Greece) Nikos Alefantos
  - Olympiacos: 1983–1984, 1994–1995, 2004
  - AEK Athens: 1986–1987
- (Greece) Antonis Georgiadis
  - AEK Athens: 1984–1985
  - Olympiacos: 1985–1986
- (Poland) Jacek Gmoch
  - AEK Athens: 1985–1986
  - Olympiacos: 1988–1989
- (Bosnia and Herzegovina) Dušan Bajević
  - AEK Athens: 1988–1996, 2002–2004, 2008–2010
  - Olympiacos: 1996–1999, 2004–2005
- (Ukraine) Oleg Blokhin
  - Olympiacos: 1990–1993
  - AEK Athens: 1998–1999
- (Germany) Ewald Lienen
  - Olympiacos: 2010
  - AEK Athens: 2012–2013
- (Georgia (country)) Temur Ketsbaia
  - Olympiacos: 2009
  - AEK Athens: 2016
