= 1934–35 Panhellenic Championship =

Abandoned season of top-tier football league in Greece

Panhellenic Championship
- Season: 1934–35
- Champions: none
- Relegated: none

The 1934–35 Panhellenic Championship was not held due to increased obligations of the Greece national team to fully prepare for the 5th Balkan Cup. Ten teams from the 3 founding associations of HFF participated in the Panhellenic Championship 1934–35, divided into 2 groups, South and North. They were represented by the same number of clubs as the previous championship and specifically by them, since the local championships were stopped to save time.

The South Group was formed by 6 teams which resulted as follows:

- Athenian Championship: The first 4 teams of the ranking.
- Piraeus' Championship: The first 2 teams of the ranking.

The North Group was formed by 4 teams which resulted as follows:

- Macedonian Championship: The first 4 teams of the ranking.

The fixtures of the 2 groups ended with Ethnikos Piraeus and Aris emerging first, respectively. However, the final phase of the championship did not take place and consequently there was no champion. According to the announcement of the event, in the final phase, the first two of each group qualified, namely Ethnikos, Panathinaikos, Aris and Iraklis. There was a delay due to a request from Olympiacos, which had tied with the first two in the South group and asked, as the holder of the previous 1933–34 championship, to participate as well. Finally, the request was rejected and in mid-June the Championship Committee of the HFF announced the program of the final phase starting on 16/06 and ending on 21/07/1935. However, its holding was postponed and then canceled. The point system was: Win: 2 points – Draw: 1 point – Loss: 0 points.

== Qualification round ==
=== Athens Football Clubs Association ===
The Athenian championship started in 21 October 1934 and it was suspended in November 18, with the completion of only 6 games. The suspension of the regional championships of Athens, Piraeus and Thessaloniki was decided for the national team to participate in the Balkan Cup, which was organized by the HFF and was held at Leoforos Alexandras Stadium. So this season no one was declared Athenian champion.

Pos	Team	Pld	W	D	L	GF	GA	GD	Pts	Qualification
1	AEK Athens (Q)	2	2	0	0	4	0	+4	4	South Group
2	Panathinaikos (Q)	2	2	0	0	13	4	+9	4	South Group
3	Apollon Athens (Q)	3	2	0	1	11	6	+5	4	South Group
4	Goudi Athens (Q)	2	0	0	2	1	6	−5	0	South Group
5	Attikos	1	0	0	1	1	8	−7	0	Athens-Piraeus' championship*
6	Atromitos	2	0	0	2	0	6	−6	0	Athens-Piraeus' championship*

Source: rsssf
(Q) Qualified for the phase indicated

==== Top scorers ====
Rank	Player	Club	Goals
1	(Greece) Dimitris Sofianopoulos	Panathinaikos	7
2	(Greece) Ilias Kritikos	AEK Athens	3
2	(Greece) Prokopiou	Apollon Athens	3
4	(Greece) Dimou	Apollon Athens	2
4	(Greece) Pananos	Apollon Athens	2
4	(Greece) Chatzisavvas	Apollon Athens	2
4	(Greece) Antonis Migiakis	Panathinaikos	2
4	(Greece) Dimitris Baltasis	Panathinaikos	2
9	(Greece) Anastasios Kritikos	Panathinaikos	1
9	(Greece) Takis Triantafyllis	Panathinaikos	1
9	(Greece) Kostas Negris	Goudi Athens	1
9	(Greece) Palios	Apollon Athens	1
9	(Greece) M. Statos	Apollon Athens	1
9	(Greece) Sarigiannis	Attikos	1
9	(Greece) Alekos Chatzistavridis	AEK Athens	1

=== Piraeus Football Clubs Association ===
Pos	Team	Pld	W	D	L	GF	GA	GD	Pts	Qualification
1	Ethnikos Piraeus (Q)	1	1	0	0	2	0	+2	2	South Group
2	Olympiacos (Q)	0	0	0	0	0	0	0	0	South Group
3	Argonaftis Piraeus	0	0	0	0	0	0	0	0	Athens-Piraeus' championship*
4	Thiseas Piraeus	1	0	0	1	0	2	−2	0	Athens-Piraeus' championship*
5	Amyna Kokkinia	0	0	0	0	0	0	0	0	Athens-Piraeus' championship*

Source: rsssf
(Q) Qualified for the phase indicated

The Piraeus' championship was planned with 5 clubs but was suspended after holding only one match, on 21/10/1934, in which Ethnikos prevailed over Theseas 2–0. No other matches took place, because Olympiacos and Amyna Kokkinias were absent, due to a dispute with the Piraeus' Association. The Association punished the 2 clubs by excluding them from the championship. Filathloi, Faliriki and Moschato sided with Olympiacos and Amyna. These 5 clubs asked to be removed from the registers of the Piraeus' Association. The HFF solved the issue by its decision, which asked the 3 Associations to stop their championships and to appoint their representatives for the Panellenic championship. Thus, Piraeus' Association, like the Athenian Association, canceled its top tier championship and declared Olympiacos and Ethnikos for the Panellenic championship, without any matches. At the end of March 1935, the expelled clubs returned to the Piraeus' Association.

*The clubs of Athenian and Piraeus' Association that did not participate in the Panellenic championship, which were Atromitos, Attikos, Amyna Kokkinias, Argonaftis Piraeus and Theseas Piraeus, participated in a joint of Athens-Piraeus' championship that started on May 19 and it was programmed to end on 7 July. The informal title was won by Attikos.

=== Macedonia Football Clubs Association ===
The Macedonia Football Clubs Association appointed Aris, PAOK, Iraklis and Megas Alexandros to play directly in the North group of the Panellenic championship and the Thessaloniki championship was held without them.

== Semi-final round ==
=== South Group ===
Pos	Team	Pld	W	D	L	GF	GA	GR	Pts	Qualification	ETH	PAO	OLY	APOL	AEK	GDI
1	Ethnikos Piraeus (Q)	10	6	1	3	35	15	2.333	13	Final Round; 1935–36 Panhellenic Championship		2–1	1–2	2–1	2–1	9–1
2	Panathinaikos (Q)	10	6	1	3	24	11	2.182	13	Final Round; 1935–36 Panhellenic Championship	1–0		1–0	0–5	3–0	10–1
3	Olympiacos	10	5	3	2	23	13	1.769	13	1935–36 Panhellenic Championship	5–2	2–0		1–1	4–0	1–1
4	Apollon Athens (Note: Apollon Athens has −1 point.)	10	3	3	4	25	16	1.563	8	1935–36 Panhellenic Championship	1–1	0–2 (Note: The initial 2–4 was canceled and Apollon was punished by deducting a point. Awarded 0–2 to Panathinaikos.)	4–3		2–2	8–0
5	AEK Athens	10	2	3	5	14	23	0.609	7	1935–36 Panhellenic Championship	1–5	1–1	2–2	2–1		4–0
6	Goudi Athens	10	2	1	7	11	54	0.204	5		1–11	0–5	1–3	3–2	3–1	

Source: rsssf
(Q) Qualified for the phase indicated

=== North Group ===
Pos	Team	Pld	W	D	L	GF	GA	GR	Pts	Qualification	ARIS	IRA	PAOK	MEG
1	Aris (Q)	6	3	2	1	21	9	2.333	8	Final Round; 1935–36 Panhellenic Championship		4–0	1–0	4–4
2	Iraklis (Note: Iraklis has −1 point.) (Q)	6	4	0	2	16	7	2.286	7	Final Round; 1935–36 Panhellenic Championship	4–3		3–1	7–0
3	PAOK	6	3	1	2	10	8	1.250	7	1935–36 Panhellenic Championship	1–1	2–0 (Note: The initial 1–0 was canceled and Iraklis was punished by deducting a point. Awarded 2–0 to PAOK.)		2–0 (Note: Megas Alexandros did not show up for the match. Awarded 2–0 to PAOK.)
4	Megas Alexandros	6	0	1	5	4	27	0.148	1		0–8	0–2	0–4	

Source: rsssf
(Q) Qualified for the phase indicated

== Final round ==
Not played.

== See also ==
- 1935 Balkan Cup
- Balkan Cup
