= Georgios Daraklitsas =

Greek footballer

Personal information
- Full name: Georgios Daraklitsas
- Date of birth: 1 August 1968 (age 58)
- Place of birth: Karditsa, Greece
- Height: 1.72 m (5 ft 8 in)
- Position: Midfielder

Senior career*
Years	Team	Apps	(Gls)
1987–1988	Anagennisi Karditsa		
1988–1989	Aris	23	(3)
1989–2003	Ionikos	281	(14)
2003–2004	Ethnikos Piraeus		
2004–2006	Agia Paraskevi		
2006–2007	Proteas Palea Fokea		
- * Club domestic league appearances and goals

Georgios Daraklitsas (Greek: Γεώργιος Νταρακλίτσας; born 1 August 1968) is a Greek retired football midfielder.
