= Aristidis Louvaris =

Greek footballer

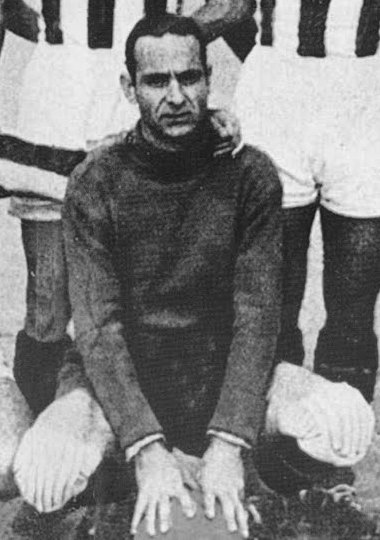
- Aristidis Louvaris with Olympiacos

Personal information
- Full name: Aristidis Louvaris
- Date of birth: 1913
- Place of birth: Piraeus, Greece
- Date of death: 13 January 2009 (aged 95–96)
- Place of death: Marousi, Athens, Greece
- Position: Goalkeeper

Senior career*
Years	Team	Apps	(Gls)
1931−1935	AEK Athens		
1935−1941	Thiseas Piraeus		
1941−1949	Olympiacos		
- * Club domestic league appearances and goals

Aristidis Louvaris (Greek: Αριστείδης Λούβαρης; 1913–9 January 2009) was a Greek footballer who played as a goalkeeper.

== Club career ==
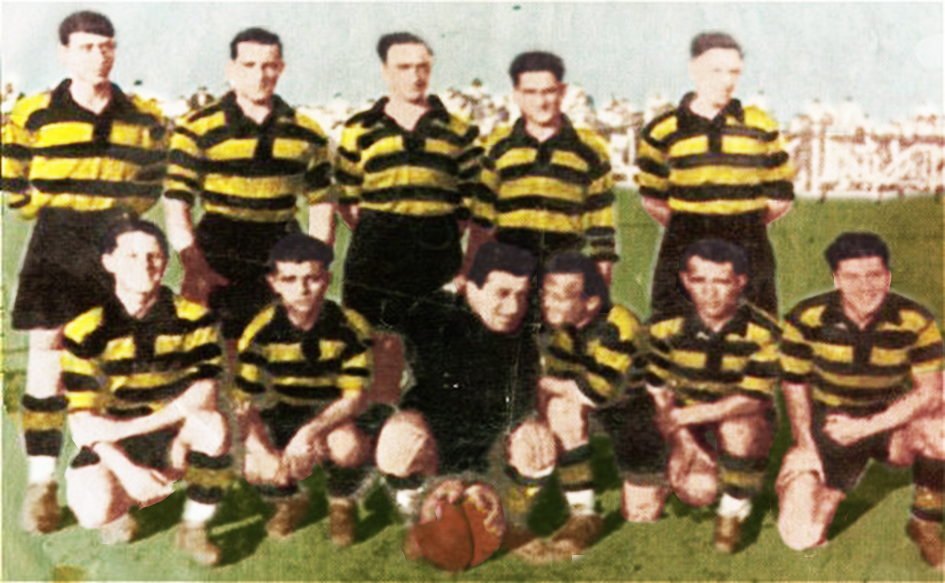
AEK at 1932 Cup.

Louvaris started football when he joined AEK Athens at the age of 18. He played at the club for four years, until 1935. There he won the first Greek Cup in 1932. However, he was in the shadow of the legendary goalkeeper, Giorgos Giamalis and thus he was transferred to Theseus Piraeus. He played there from 1936 until the start of the World War II, in 1941.

Afterwards, he joined Olympiacos, thereby making the big dream of his life come true. He took over from the then great international goalkeeper, Achilleas Grammatikopoulos. But since the events of the War and the Occupation occurred, Louvaris spent the greatest and most fruitful period of his career being inactive, as all of the Greek football at the time. Despite all this, he trained with his teammates at the risk of his life, on the courts of Kaisariani, Piraeus and Kokkinia. His passion for football that held inside him for five years, broke out at the end of 1944, after the liberation of Greece. When football started to restore, Louvaris played as the permanent goalkeeper, not only for Olympiacos, but also for the Greek national and military team. After making his best appearances in 1946, the Romanian champion, Venus requested his transfer, but the company of petroleum in which Louvaris was working did not allow him to leave Greece. With Olympiacos won 2 consecutive Panhellenic Championships, 1 Cup and 4 consecutive Piraeus FCA Championships, including a domestic double in 1947. until his retirement in 1949.

== International career ==
Louvaris appeared 5 times with Greece and the military team, playing in the first post-war matches.

== Personal life ==
Louvaris lived in Marousi until he died on 13 January 2009. His son, Giorgos was the A' vice-president at Olympiacos for years.

== Honours ==
AEK Athens

- Greek Cup: 1931–32

Olympiacos

- Panhellenic Championship: 1946–47, 1947–48
- Greek Cup: 1938–39, 1946–47
- Piraeus FCA League: 1946, 1947, 1948, 1949
