= Milenko Kovačević =

Serbian footballer (1963–2022)

Personal information
- Date of birth: 6 November 1963
- Place of birth: Šabac, SR Serbia, SFR Yugoslavia
- Date of death: 23 April 2022 (aged 58)
- Position: Midfielder

Senior career*
Years	Team	Apps	(Gls)
- Železničar Šabac
1988–1990	Mačva Šabac	71	(12)
1990–1992	Rad	63	(10)
1992–1995	Apollon Athens	93	(13)
1995–1997	AEK Larnaca	51	(14)
1997–1998	Nea Salamis Famagusta	23	(8)
Total		301	(57)
- * Club domestic league appearances and goals

Milenko Kovačević (Serbian Cyrillic: Миленко Ковачевић; 6 November 1963 – 23 April 2022) was a professional footballer who played as a midfielder for clubs in Yugoslavia, Greece and Cyprus.

== Club career ==
Kovačević began playing top-tier football with FK Rad in the then Yugoslav First League. He also played for hometown club Železničar Šabac and Mačva Šabac.

Kovačević moved to Greece in July 1992, where he played for Greek first division side Apollon Athens, making 93 appearances during his three seasons in the Greek top flight.

Kovačević finished his playing career in Cyprus with AEK Larnaca and Nea Salamis Famagusta.
