= 1992–93 Alpha Ethniki =

57th season of top-tier football league in Greece

Alpha Ethniki
- Season: 1992–93
- Champions: AEK Athens; 10th Greek title
- Relegated: Pierikos; Ionikos; Korinthos
- Champions League: AEK Athens
- Cup Winners' Cup: Panathinaikos
- UEFA Cup: Olympiacos; OFI
- Matches: 306
- Goals: 821 (2.68 per match)
- Top goalscorer: Vasilis Dimitriadis (33 goals)

The 1992–93 Alpha Ethniki was the 57th season of the highest football league of Greece. The season began on 5 September 1992 and ended on 6 June 1993. AEK Athens won their second consecutive and tenth Greek title. This was the first season in which the new points system was introduced (Win: 3 points - Draw: 1 point - Loss: 0 points), replacing the corresponding 2–1–0 and remained as it is since then.

== Teams ==
Promoted from 1991–92 Beta Ethniki	Relegated from 1991–92 Alpha Ethniki
Apollon Kalamarias; Ionikos; Edessaikos	Panionios; Panserraikos; Ethnikos Piraeus

=== Stadiums and personnel ===
Location of teams in 1992–93 Alpha Ethniki

Team	Manager^{1}	Location	Stadium
AEK Athens	(Bosnia and Herzegovina) Dušan Bajević	Athens (Nea Filadelfeia)	Nikos Goumas Stadium
AEL	(Bulgaria) Hristo Bonev	Larissa	Alcazar Stadium
Apollon Athens	(Greece) Christos Archontidis	Athens (Rizoupoli)	Rizoupoli Stadium
Apollon Kalamarias	(Germany) Gerhard Prokop	Thessaloniki (Kalamaria)	Kalamaria Stadium
Aris	(Greece) Georgios Firos	Thessaloniki (Charilaou)	Kleanthis Vikelidis Stadium
Athinaikos	(Greece) Stathis Stathopoulos	Athens (Vyronas)	Vyronas National Stadium
Doxa Drama	(Greece) Michalis Filippou	Drama	Doxa Drama Stadium
Edessaikos	(Greece) Makis Katsavakis	Edessa	Municipal Stadium of Edessa
Ionikos	(Greece) Sokratis Gemelos	Piraeus (Nikaia)	Neapoli Stadium
Iraklis	(Netherlands) Thijs Libregts	Thessaloniki (Triandria)	Kaftanzoglio Stadium
Korinthos	(Greece) Giannis Stefas	Corinth	Korinthos Stadium
OFI	(Netherlands) Eugène Gerards	Heraklion	Theodoros Vardinogiannis Stadium
Olympiacos	(Federal Republic of Yugoslavia) Ljupko Petrović	Piraeus (Neo Faliro)	Karaiskakis Stadium
Panachaiki	(Greece) Andreas Michalopoulos	Patras	Kostas Davourlis Stadium
Panathinaikos	(Bosnia and Herzegovina) Ivica Osim	Athens (Marousi)	Athens Olympic Stadium
PAOK	(Ukraine) Oleg Blokhin	Thessaloniki (Toumba)	Toumba Stadium
Pierikos	(Federal Republic of Yugoslavia) Jovan Kovrlija	Katerini	Katerini Municipal Stadium
Skoda Xanthi	(Greece) Vasilios Daniil	Xanthi	Xanthi Ground

- ^{1} On final match day of the season, played on 6 June 1993.

== League table ==
Pos	Team	Pld	W	D	L	GF	GA	GD	Pts	Qualification or relegation
1	AEK Athens (C)	34	24	6	4	78	27	+51	78	Qualification for Champions League first round
2	Panathinaikos	34	24	5	5	85	21	+64	77	Qualification for Cup Winners' Cup first round
3	Olympiacos	34	20	8	6	68	31	+37	68	Qualification for UEFA Cup first round
4	OFI	34	19	9	6	64	32	+32	66	Qualification for UEFA Cup first round
5	PAOK	34	17	6	11	52	38	+14	57	
6	Iraklis	34	16	8	10	51	41	+10	56	
7	AEL	34	11	10	13	36	42	−6	43	
8	Skoda Xanthi	34	11	9	14	56	66	−10	42	
9	Aris	34	12	6	16	40	50	−10	42	
10	Athinaikos	34	9	12	13	27	37	−10	39	
11	Panachaiki	34	10	9	15	41	50	−9	39	
12	Apollon Athens	34	10	7	17	27	49	−22	37	
13	Doxa Drama	34	9	9	16	34	57	−23	36	
14	Edessaikos	34	9	8	17	38	60	−22	35	
15	Apollon Kalamarias	34	7	14	13	28	44	−16	35	
16	Pierikos (R)	34	9	7	18	35	62	−27	34	Relegation to Beta Ethniki
17	Ionikos (R)	34	9	6	19	33	49	−16	33	Relegation to Beta Ethniki
18	Korinthos (R)	34	6	9	19	28	65	−37	27	Relegation to Beta Ethniki

Source: RSSSF
Rules for classification: 1st points; 2nd head-to-head points; 3rd head-to-head goal difference; 4th decision match.
(C) Champions; (R) Relegated

== Results ==
Home \ Away	AEK	AEL	APA	APK	ARIS	ATH	DOX	EDE	ION	IRA	KOR	OFI	OLY	PNA	PAO	PAOK	PIE	XAN
AEK Athens		2–1	3–0	2–0	1–0	5–1	5–0	1–0	3–0	4–0	7–0	3–2	3–1	2–1	3–1	3–1	3–1	3–1
AEL	0–1		1–2	1–1	2–1	1–0	1–1	3–0	1–0	1–0	0–0	1–1	0–0	5–2	0–3	4–3	2–1	2–0
Apollon Athens	0–3	2–0		2–0	1–0	2–0	1–0	3–0	2–0	1–1	1–1	0–2	1–3	0–0	0–2	2–1	2–1	0–0
Apollon Kalamarias	1–0	1–1	1–0		0–1	0–0	1–1	2–2	1–0	1–0	1–0	1–1	0–3	1–0	2–2	0–0	3–1	2–2
Aris	1–1	1–2	1–1	0–0		1–1	1–0	2–1	2–1	1–0	1–1	1–2	2–1	4–1	0–1	1–2	2–1	4–2
Athinaikos	0–0	0–0	1–0	1–0	3–1		0–0	0–0	0–1	1–2	0–0	1–2	1–1	2–1	0–2	1–0	0–0	3–0
Doxa Drama	1–3	2–0	2–0	1–0	0–2	0–1		1–1	1–0	1–1	1–0	0–2	1–1	2–1	0–3	1–1	1–0	2–2
Edessaikos	0–1	2–0	2–0	3–2	2–1	4–2	1–1		3–0	2–3	1–4	1–1	1–4	1–4	0–0	3–1	1–1	3–1
Ionikos	4–3	0–1	2–0	1–1	0–1	2–0	1–2	1–0		4–1	1–1	0–1	1–2	2–1	1–2	0–1	2–2	2–1
Iraklis	1–1	2–2	2–0	1–1	1–1	3–0	3–2	1–2	1–0		6–0	1–0	2–1	1–0	3–2	1–0	2–1	4–1
Korinthos	1–4	2–1	0–0	1–1	3–2	0–0	3–5	1–0	0–1	1–1		0–1	1–3	3–1	0–3	1–2	2–1	1–2
OFI	1–1	4–1	3–0	1–1	3–1	2–0	4–1	2–0	3–2	2–2	3–0		2–1	1–1	0–1	4–0	3–0	5–0
Olympiacos	1–0	2–1	5–2	5–1	2–0	2–2	2–0	1–1	2–0	1–0	3–0	3–0		0–2	1–0	2–0	4–0	5–1
Panachaiki	0–0	1–0	3–1	3–1	1–3	0–1	2–1	1–0	2–2	3–1	2–0	0–0	1–1		1–3	0–0	1–0	2–2
Panathinaikos	1–1	3–0	4–0	3–0	5–0	2–0	5–1	9–1	3–0	2–0	4–0	3–1	2–3	2–0		5–0	4–0	2–0
PAOK	2–1	1–1	2–0	2–0	2–0	1–0	5–0	3–0	4–1	0–1	3–1	1–2	0–0	3–0	1–1		3–0	4–1
Pierikos	0–1	1–0	0–0	1–0	3–0	0–3	1–0	1–0	0–0	1–3	1–0	3–2	2–1	3–3	0–0	1–2		3–2
Skoda Xanthi	3–4	0–0	3–1	2–1	3–1	2–2	3–2	2–0	1–1	1–0	2–0	1–1	1–1	2–0	2–0	2–3	8–2	

Source: RSSSF
Legend: Blue = home team win; Yellow = draw; Red = away team win.

== Top scorers ==
Rank	Player	Club	Goals
1	(Greece) Vasilis Dimitriadis	AEK Athens	33
2	(Poland) Krzysztof Warzycha	Panathinaikos	32
3	(Brazil) Marcelo Veridiano	Skoda Xanthi	21
4	(Nigeria) Amaechi Ottiji	Panachaiki	17
5	(Greece) Georgios Athanasiadis	Skoda Xanthi	15
6	(Greece) Alexis Alexandris	AEK Athens	14
7	(Ukraine) Oleh Protasov	Olympiacos	13
7	(Serbia and Montenegro) Dragan Đukanović	OFI	13
9	(Greece) Christos Kostis	Iraklis	12
9	(Serbia and Montenegro) Zoran Lončar	Aris	12
9	(Greece) Kostas Frantzeskos	Panathinaikos	12

== Awards ==
=== Annual awards ===
Award	Winner	Club
Greek Player of the Season	(Greece) Stelios Manolas (Greece) Nikos Nioplias	AEK Athens; Panathinaikos
Foreign Player of the Season	(Poland) Krzysztof Warzycha	Panathinaikos
Young Player of the Season	(Greece) Nikos Machlas	OFI
Golden Boot	(Greece) Vasilis Dimitriadis	AEK Athens
Greek Manager of the Season	(Greece) Makis Katsavakis	Edessaikos
Foreign Manager of the Season	(Bosnia and Herzegovina) Dušan Bajević	AEK Athens

== Attendances ==
Panathinaikos drew the highest average home attendance in the 1992–93 Alpha Ethniki.

#	Team	Average attendance
1	Panathinaikos	16,215
2	AEK Athens	14,955
3	Olympiacos	13,061
4	OFI	5,044
5	AEL	4,827
6	Aris	4,097
7	PAOK	3,728
8	Skoda Xanthi	3,472
9	Edessaikos	3,348
10	Iraklis	3,276
11	Panachaiki	3,156
12	Ionikos	2,769
13	Korinthos	2,133
14	Apollon Kalamarias	1,934
15	Apollon Athens	1,888
16	Pierikos	1,878
17	Doxa Drama	1,474
18	Athinaikos	1,320
