= 1992–93 Greek Football Cup =

1992–93 Greek Cup
Tournament details
- Country: Greece
- Teams: 72

Final positions
- Champions: Panathinaikos (13th title)
- Runners-up: Olympiacos

Tournament statistics
- Matches played: 117
- Top goal scorer(s): Vasilis Dimitriadis (10 goals)

The 1992–93 Greek Football Cup was the 51st edition of the Greek Football Cup.

== Tournament details ==
Totally 72 teams participated, 18 from Alpha Ethniki, 18 from Beta, and 36 from Gamma. It was held in 6 rounds, included final.

Without particular surprises, minus the elimination of Aris in the group stage by Ethnikos Piraeus and Paniliakos, teams of lower divisions, the three big teams of Attica qualified easily or with difficulty to semi-finals. In that round, Olympiacos eliminated AEK Athens, the season's champions, after two very interesting matches, with qualification to be judged in extra time. Panathinaikos had easier task against Apollon Athens.

In the final, that was held at the Olympic Stadium, Panathinaikos managed to win their "eternal" opponent by 1–0, opening the path for a line of three cup conquest in a row. Vasilis Dimitriadis emerged as the top scorer, scoring 10 goals.

== Calendar ==
Round	Date(s)	Fixtures	Clubs	New entries
Group stage	16, 19, 23 August 1992	56	72 → 32	72
Round of 32	2, 16 December 1992	32	32 → 16	none
Round of 16	13, 27 January 1993	16	16 → 8	none
Quarter-finals	10, 24 February 1993	8	8 → 4	none
Semi-finals	24 March, 14 April 1993	4	4 → 2	none
Final	12 May 1993	1	2 → 1	none

== Group stage ==
The phase was played in a single round-robin format. Each win would gain 2 points, each draw 1 and each loss would not gain any point.

=== Group 1 ===
Pos	Team	Pts
1	Ethnikos Piraeus	6
2	Paniliakos	5
3	Aris	5
4	PAS Giannina	4
5	Charavgiakos	0

=== Group 2 ===
Pos	Team	Pts
1	Panachaiki	7
2	Olympiacos Volos	7
3	EAR	3
4	Chalkida	2
5	Pontioi Kozani	1

=== Group 3 ===
Pos	Team	Pts
1	Olympiacos	8
2	Atromitos	6
3	Anagennisi Chalkidona	4
4	Aiolikos	1
5	Anagennisi Arta	1

=== Group 4 ===
Pos	Team	Pts
1	AEL	7
2	Anagennisi Karditsa	6
3	Diagoras	3
4	Doxa Vyronas	3
5	Kallithea	2

=== Group 5 ===
Pos	Team	Pts
1	OFI	8
2	Pontioi Veria	6
3	Levadiakos	2
4	Egaleo	2
5	Kerkyra	2

=== Group 6 ===
Pos	Team	Pts
1	Edessaikos	6
2	Irodotos	4
3	Anagennisi Giannitsa	4
4	Pannafpliakos	4
5	Anagennisi Kolindros	2

=== Group 7 ===
Pos	Team	Pts
1	Panathinaikos	6
2	Kalamata	5
3	Trikala	4
4	Panelefsiniakos	3
5	Kastoria	2

=== Group 8 ===
Pos	Team	Pts
1	Asteras Ambelokipoi	6
2	Iraklis	5
3	Kavala	5
4	Panetolikos	2
5	Rodos	2

=== Group 9 ===
Pos	Team	Pts
1	Doxa Drama	5
2	Apollon Kalamarias	4
3	Ethnikos Asteras	2
4	Poseidon Heraklion	1

=== Group 10 ===
Pos	Team	Pts
1	PAOK	5
2	Proodeftiki	5
3	Eordaikos	2
4	Pandramaikos	0

=== Group 11 ===
Pos	Team	Pts
1	Naoussa	5
2	Korinthos	3
3	Apollon Larissa	2
4	Veria	2

=== Group 12 ===
Pos	Team	Pts
1	Ionikos	5
2	Panserraikos	3
3	Kilkisiakos	2
4	Fokikos	2

=== Group 13 ===
Pos	Team	Pts
1	Makedonikos	6
2	Skoda Xanthi	4
3	Odysseas Kordelio	2
4	Chaidari	0

=== Group 14 ===
Pos	Team	Pts
1	Pierikos	6
2	Panionios	4
3	Nigrita	2
4	Panarkadikos	0

=== Group 15 ===
Pos	Team	Pts
1	AEK Athens	5
2	Apollon Athens	3
3	Panargiakos	3
4	Poseidon Michaniona	1

=== Group 16 ===
Pos	Team	Pts
1	Athinaikos	4
2	Ilisiakos	3
3	Sparta	3
4	Ethnikos Alexandroupoli	2

== Knockout phase ==
Each tie in the knockout phase, apart from the final, was played over two legs, with each team playing one leg at home. The team that scored more goals on aggregate over the two legs advanced to the next round. If the aggregate score was level, the away goals rule was applied, i.e. the team that scored more goals away from home over the two legs advanced. If away goals were also equal, then extra time was played. The away goals rule was again applied after extra time, i.e. if there were goals scored during extra time and the aggregate score was still level, the visiting team advanced by virtue of more away goals scored. If no goals were scored during extra time, the winners were decided by a penalty shoot-out. In the final, which were played as a single match, if the score was level at the end of normal time, extra time was played, followed by a penalty shoot-out if the score was still level.
The mechanism of the draws for each round is as follows:

- There are no seedings, and teams from the same group can be drawn against each other.

== Bracket ==
Round of 32
Pierikos	2	0	2
Olympiacos	2	3	5
Ilisiakos	2	0	2
Olympiacos Volos	3	3	6
PAOK	3	1	4
Doxa Drama (a)	3	1	4
Edessaikos	1	0	2
Kalamata	1	1	1
AEL	2	0	2
Skoda Xanthi	0	0	0
Irodotos	0	0	0
Panionios	0	2	2
Anagennisi Karditsa	2	0	2
Atromitos (a.e.t.)	0	4	4
AEK Athens	1	3	4
Ionikos	0	0	0
Panachaiki	1	1	2
Pontioi Veria	0	1	1
Ethnikos Piraeus	2	1	3
Naoussa	1	0	1
Korinthos	0	0	0
Apollon Athens	3	0	3
Athinaikos (a)	1	1	2
Proodeftiki	0	2	2
Iraklis	2	1	3
Makedonikos	0	0	0
Paniliakos	1	1	2
Panathinaikos	2	6	8
Panserraikos	1	1	2
Apollon Kalamarias	0	4	4
Asteras Ambelokipoi	0	0	0
OFI	3	2	5

Round of 16
Olympiacos	1	2	3
Olympiacos Volos	0	1	1
Doxa Drama (a.e.t.)	2	2	4
Kalamata	1	2	3
AEL (p)	2	0	2(6)
Panionios	0	2	2(5)
Atromitos	1	1	2
AEK Athens (a.e.t.)	1	2	3
Panachaiki	3	0	3
Ethnikos Piraeus	1	0	1
Apollon Athens	2	0	2
Athinaikos	0	1	1
Iraklis	0	0	0
Panathinaikos	2	1	3
Apollon Kalamarias	1	0	1
OFI	1	3	4

Quarter-finals
Olympiacos	3	0	3
Doxa Drama	0	0	0
AEL	1	1	2
AEK Athens (a.e.t.)	0	3	3
Panachaiki	2	1	4
Apollon Athens	0	4	4
Panathinaikos	5	2	7
OFI	2	1	3

Semi-finals
Olympiacos (a.e.t.)	1	2	3
AEK Athens	0	3	3
Apollon Athens	1	1	2
Panathinaikos	4	1	5

Final
Olympiacos	0
Panathinaikos	1

== Round of 32 ==
Team 1	Agg.	Team 2	1st leg	2nd leg
Iraklis	3–0	Makedonikos	2–0	1–0
Pierikos	2–5	Olympiacos	2–2	0–3
Paniliakos	2–8	Panathinaikos	1–2	1–6
Korinthos	0–3	Apollon Athens	0–3	0–0
Anagennisi Karditsa	2–4	Atromitos	2–0	0–4 (a.e.t.)
AEK Athens	4–0	Ionikos	1–0	3–0
Irodotos	0–2	Panionios	0–0	0–2
Ethnikos Piraeus	3–1	Naoussa	2–1	1–0
Panachaiki	2–1	Pontioi Veria	1–0	1–1
Edessaikos	2–1	Kalamata	1–1	0–1
Panserraikos	2–4	Apollon Kalamarias	1–0	1–4
Athinaikos	(a) 2–2	Proodeftiki	1–0	1–2
Ilisiakos	2–6	Olympiacos Volos	2–3	0–3
AEL	2–0	Skoda Xanthi	2–0	0–0
Asteras Ambelokipoi	0–5	OFI	0–3	0–2
PAOK	4–4 (a)	Doxa Drama	3–3	1–1

== Round of 16 ==
Team 1	Agg.	Team 2	1st leg	2nd leg
Panachaiki	3–1	Ethnikos Piraeus	3–1	0–0
Doxa Drama	4–3	Kalamata	2–1	2–2 (a.e.t.)
Olympiacos	3–1	Olympiacos Volos	1–0	2–1
Iraklis	0–3	Panathinaikos	0–2	0–1
Atromitos	2–3	AEK Athens	1–1	1–2 (a.e.t.)
Apollon Athens	2–1	Athinaikos	2–0	0–1
AEL	2–2 (6–5 p)	Panionios	2–0	0–2
Apollon Kalamarias	1–4	OFI	1–1	0–3

== Quarter-finals ==
Team 1	Agg.	Team 2	1st leg	2nd leg
Panathinaikos	7–3	OFI	5–2	2–1
AEL	2–3	AEK Athens	1–0	1–3 (a.e.t.)
Panachaiki	3–4	Apollon Athens	2–0	1–4
Olympiacos	3–0	Doxa Drama	3–0	0–0

== Semi-finals ==
Team 1	Agg.	Team 2	1st leg	2nd leg
Olympiacos	(a) 3–3	AEK Athens	1–0	2–3 (a.e.t.)
Apollon Athens	2–5	Panathinaikos	1–4	1–1

== Final ==
12 May 1993
21:00 EEST

Olympiacos	0–1	Panathinaikos
	Report (page 3)	Warzycha 13'

Olympic Stadium, Marousi
Attendance: 64,532
Referee: Giorgos Bikas (Chalkidiki)
