= 1935–36 Panhellenic Championship =

7th season of top-tier football league in Greece

Panhellenic Championship
- Season: 1935–36
- Champions: Olympiacos; 4th Greek title
- Relegated: none
- Matches: 49
- Goals: 189 (3.86 per match)
- Top goalscorer: Kostas Choumis; Giannis Vazos; Tasos Kritikos; Kostas Kalogiannis (12 goals each)
- Biggest home win: Ethnikos Piraeus 6–0 Iraklis
- Biggest away win: Ethnikos Piraeus 1–4 Apollon Athens
- Highest scoring: Panathinaikos 6–2 Apollon Athens

The 1935–36 Panhellenic Championship was the seventh season of the highest football league of Greece.

It was held as a national category, in which 8 (out of 10) teams from the 3 founding Associations of the HFF, that had participated in the 2 groups of the previous season's semi-final round and resulted as follows:

- Athenian Championship: The first 3 Athenian teams of the ranking in the 1934–35 South Group.
- Piraeus' Championship: The 2 Piraeus' teams of the 1934–35 South Group.
- Macedonian Championship: The first 3 Macedonian teams of the ranking in the 1934–35 North Group.

Those teams did not participate in their regional leagues in that season. The event started on October 26, 1935 and ended on June 14, 1936. Olympiacos emerged champion, having only a 4-1 defeat by Panathinaikos. The point system was: Win: 2 points - Draw: 1 point - Loss: 0 points.

== League table ==
Pos	Team	Pld	W	D	L	GF	GA	GD	Pts
1	Olympiacos (C)	14	10	3	1	31	15	+16	23
2	Panathinaikos	14	9	1	4	37	19	+18	19
3	Apollon Athens	14	7	3	4	30	23	+7	17
4	Aris	14	4	5	5	21	24	−3	13
5	AEK Athens	14	4	5	5	17	22	−5	13
6	Ethnikos Piraeus	14	4	3	7	21	25	−4	11
7	PAOK	14	4	3	7	23	32	−9	11
8	Iraklis	14	1	3	10	16	36	−20	5

Source: rsssf
(C) Champions

== Results ==
Home \ Away	OLY	PAO	APOL	ARIS	AEK	ETH	PAOK	IRA
Olympiacos		6–1	3–0	2–0	2–0	2–1	4–3	2–0
Panathinaikos	4–1		6–2	2–0	3–0	6–1	1–0	1–2
Apollon Athens	2–3	3–1		5–2	1–1	4–1	2–1	3–0
Aris	0–0	1–0	0–0		2–2	2–3	3–0	3–3
AEK Athens	0–0	1–1	1–0	2–4		1–1	2–0	3–2
Ethnikos Piraeus	1–2	0–1	0–3	0–1	1–0		5–2	0–0
PAOK	2–2	1–6	3–3	2–0	4–1	1–1		1–0
Iraklis	1–2	1–4	1–2	3–3	1–3	0–6	2–3	

Source: rsssf
Legend: Blue = home team win; Yellow = draw; Red = away team win.

Ο Βάζος δυο και δυο ο Αναματερός
και ένα ο Δεπούντης και ένα ο Μαλεύρης
μας κάνουν όλα έξι
η τρύπα σας να φέξει.

"Οι Κόκκινοι Βαρκάρηδες", Θανάσης Σκρουμπέλος, Εκδόσεις Τόπος, Αθήνα 2011, ISBN 960-6863-66-2, σελ. 8

English:
Vazos two and Amateros two
and Depountis one and Malevris one
all of them make six
your hole shall shine.

== Top scorers ==
Rank	Player	Club	Goals
1	(Greece) Kostas Choumis	Ethnikos Piraeus	12
1	(Greece) Giannis Vazos	Olympiacos	12
1	(Greece) Anastasios Kritikos	Panathinaikos	12
1	(Greece) Kostas Kalogiannis	PAOK	12
