= Vasilis Dimitriadis =

Greek footballer (born 1966)

Personal information
- Full name: Vasilios Dimitriadis
- Date of birth: 1 February 1966 (age 60)
- Place of birth: Thessaloniki, Greece
- Height: 1.82 m (5 ft 11 1/2 in)
- Position: Striker

Senior career*
Years	Team	Apps	(Gls)
1986–1991	Aris	123	(38)
1991–1997	AEK Athens	154	(81)
1997	Aris	15	(8)
1997–1998	AEL Limassol		
1998–1999	Lykoi		
Total		292	(127)

International career
1988–1994	Greece	28	(2)
- * Club domestic league appearances and goals

Vasilis Dimitriadis (Greek: Βασίλης Δημητριάδης; born 1 February 1966) is a Greek former professional footballer who played as a striker.

== Club career ==
=== Aris ===
Dimitriadis started his professional career in 1986 at Aris. On 28 August 1988 he made his first hat-trick in a 4–0 victory at home over Anagennisi Arta for the Greek Cup. On 8 July 1991, Dimitriadis changed the yellow shirt of Aris for the yellow-black of AEK Athens by signing a 2-year contract, in a transfer that cost over 100 million drachmas. The club from Thessaloniki got about 95 million and the incomes of two friendly matches between the two sides, in one which Dimitriadis scored. PAOK were also interested in Dimitriadis with their president, Thomas Voulinos, offering 105 million drachmas plus the goalkeeper Gitsioudis, but the bad relations between the two clubs of Thessaloniki and the quick moves of the then president of AEK, Kostas Generakis did not allow that move to happen.

=== AEK Athens ===
On 6 November 1991 Dimitriadis scored the decider goal in the home match against Spartak Moscow, which gave AEK the 2–1 win and the qualification to the third round of the UEFA Cup. On 12 April 1992 he scored a hat-trick against Panachaiki in a 5–1 home win in the league. 2 matchdays later he scored another hat-trick, this time in the 6–0 victory at home against Panionios. In his first season with the yellow-blacks Dimitriadis helped his team win the league scoring 28 goals, finishing the season as the top scorer.

On 13 September 1992 Dimitriadis scored 4 goals in the 5–1 win against Athinaikos. On 21 October 1992 he scored the winner with a beautiful header in the home win against PSV Eindhoven for the second round of the UEFA Champions League. On 29 November 1992 he scored all three goals of his team against PAOK in a 3–1 home win. He scored another hat-trick on 25 April 1993 against Apollon Athens in a 3–0 victory at home. Dimitriadis got to repeat the success of his first season by winning another league title and emerging as the top scorer, this time with 33 goals, winning the European Silver shoe, with one goal less of the first Ally McCoist of Rangers.

In the summer of 1993 his contract expired when his career was at its peak but the proposals did not manage to come after Dimitriadis agreed with Dimitris Melissanidis within 5 minutes to renew his contract. However, from this point on his career at AEK was starting to decline. In the following season he scored only 11 goals, nevertheless he won the third league title in a row. On 20 April 1994, he entered the Cup final against Panathinaikos in the 60th minute and scored 17 minutes later, in a match that ended 3–3 after extra time and went to penalty shoot-out and with Dimitriadis missing his penalty, AEK lost the title and together the chance to win the domestic double.

In the summer of 1994, the additions of Saravakos, Ketsbaia and Kostis in the team's offense made the competition difficult for Dimitriadis who managed to score 8 goals in the league. The following season, all his appearances were as a substitution, usually entering the pitch in last minutes of the match scoring just one league goal. He added two more trophies in his collection winning the Cup and the Super Cup. Dimitriadis played a total of 5.5 years with AEK, winning 3 championships in a row, 1 Cup and 1 Super Cup. In the summer of 1996, AEK acquired Demis Nikolaidis from Apollon Athens in which Dimitriadis was rummored to be one the exchanges for the transfer. Confused, he requested to leave the club, but owner and president of AEK, Trochanas stated that the whole case was a misunderstanding.

=== Later career ===
Dimitriadis terminated his contract AEK and on 31 January 1997 he returned to Aris. Οn 27 March 1997 he returned at Nea Filadelfeia, as an opponent of AEK and in the 28th minute he scored against his former club, with the fans of AEK reacting by chanting his name, showing their appreciation for their former player. Even though he scored 8 goals, his team was relegated and he eventually left the club.

In the summer of 1997 he moved to Cyprus and joined AEL Limassol for a season. Afterwards, he returned to Greece the following season in order to play for the second division side, Lykoi. He scored against Achaiki for the first round of the Cup, in the club's greatest season, where they reached quarter-finals of the institution. At the end of the season in 1999, Dimitriadis retired as a footballer.

== International career ==
Dimitriadis played 28 times for Greece scoring 2 goals. He was part of the squad that reached the group stage of the 1994 FIFA World Cup, in which he played twice.

== After football ==
In 1998 Dimitriadis became the general leader and the head of the football department of AEK for one season, later returning to the same role from September 2009 until the summer of 2012. In the summer of 2013 he again returned to the same role, staying until March 2022.

== Honours ==
AEK Athens

- Alpha Ethniki: 1991–92, 1992–93, 1993–94
- Greek Cup: 1995–96, 1996–97
- Greek Super Cup: 1996

Individual

- Alpha Ethniki top scorer: 1991–92, 1992–93
- Greek Cup top scorer: 1992–93
- European Silver Shoe: 1992–93
