= Amaechi Ottiji =

Nigerian footballer

Personal information
- Full name: Amaechi Titus Ottiji
- Date of birth: 28 December 1969
- Place of birth: Enugu, Nigeria
- Date of death: 25 December 2004 (aged 34)
- Height: 1.95 m (6 ft 5 in)
- Position: Centre forward

Youth career
- Calabar Rovers

Senior career*
Years	Team	Apps	(Gls)
1987	Enugu Rangers		
1988–1990	BCC Lions		
1990–1994	Panachaiki	110	(50)
1994–1997	Ionikos	62	(14)
1997–1998	Darmstadt 98	23	(13)
1998–1999	SC Weismain	8	(4)
1999	Darmstadt 98		
1999–2000	FC Gütersloh	18	(12)
2000–2001	Sportfreunde Siegen	16	(9)
2001	VfB Oldenburg	14	(7)
2001–2003	SV Elversberg	22	(3)

International career
1998	Nigeria	1	(0)
- * Club domestic league appearances and goals

Amaechi Ottiji (28 December 1969 – 25 December 2004) was a Nigerian footballer who played as a forward for clubs in Nigeria, Greece and Germany.

== Club career ==
Born in Enugu, Ottiji began playing football for Calabar Rovers. He played for Enugu Rangers and BCC Lions, winning the 1989 Nigerian FA Cup with BCC.

In 1990, Ottiji joined Super League Greece side Panachaiki for 5.5 seasons appearing in 110 league matches and scoring 50 goals for the club. He transferred to Ionikos F.C. in December 1994, and played 2.5 seasons for the club in the Super League.

He moved to German Regionalliga side SV Darmstadt 98 in 1998, but could not prevent the club from being relegated despite scoring 12 league goals. He spent the remainder of his career in the lower levels of German football, playing in the Regionalliga for Sportfreunde Siegen and SV Elversberg.

== International career ==
Ottiji made one appearance for the Nigeria national team, in a friendly against Iran in 1998.

== Death ==
He died in Colombia in 2004, during a shooting between rival gangs.
