= List of AEK Athens F.C. records and statistics =

AEK Athens statistics at large

AEK Athens Football Club (Greek: ΠΑΕ ΑΕΚ), also known simply as AEK, AEK Athens (in European competitions), or with their full name Athlitiki Enosis Konstantinoupoleos (Greek: Αθλητική Ένωσις Κωνσταντινουπόλεως, Athletic Union of Constantinople), are a Greek association football club based in Nea Filadelfeia suburb of Athens.

The club has amassed various records since their founding. Regionally, domestically and continentally, the club has set several records in winning various official and unofficial competitions. Established in Athens in 1924 by Greek refugees from Constantinople in the wake of the Greco-Turkish War, A.E.K. are one of the most successful clubs in Greek football, winning 33 national titles (including 14 Championships, 16 Cups, 1 League Cup and 2 Super Cups). The team has appeared several times in European (UEFA Champions League and UEFA Europa League) competitions. AEK are a member of the European Club Association.

The club was relegated from the Greek Super League after the 2012–13 season for the first time in its history. In an effort to discharge the immense debt created by years of mismanagement, its directors chose for the team to compete in the third tier Football League 2 for the 2013–14 season, thus turning the club into an amateur club. After 2 seasons on the lower tiers the club completed its comeback to the first division.

== Honours ==
=== Domestic competitions ===
Leagues:

- Super League Greece
  - Winners (14): 1938–39, 1939–40, 1962–63, 1967–68, 1970–71, 1977–78, 1978–79, 1988–89, 1991–92, 1992–93, 1993–94, 2017–18, 2022–23, 2025–26
  - Runners-up (20): 1945–46, 1957–58, 1958–59, 1959–60, 1964–65, 1966–67, 1969–70, 1974–75, 1975–76, 1980–81, 1987–88, 1987–88, 1995–96, 1996–97, 1998–99, 2001–02, 2005–06, 2006–07, 2016–17, 2023–24
- Super League Greece 2 (Second Division)
  - Winners (1): 2014–15
- Gamma Ethniki (Third Division)
  - Winners (1): 2013–14 (Group 6)

Cups:

- Greek Cup
  - Winners (16): 1931–32, 1938–39, 1948–49, 1949–50, 1955–56, 1963–64, 1965–66, 1977–78, 1982–83, 1995–96, 1996–97, 1999–2000, 2001–02, 2010–11, 2015–16, 2022–23
  - Runners-up (11): 1947–48, 1952–53, 1978–79, 1993–94, 1994–95, 2005–06, 2001–02, 2015–16, 2017–18, 2018–19, 2019–20
- Greek Super Cup
  - Winners (2): 1989, 1996
- Greek League Cup
  - Winners (1) (record): 1990
- Doubles
  - Winners (3): 1938–39, 1977–78, 2022–23

=== European competitions ===
- UEFA Cup
  - Semi-finals (1): 1976–77
- European Cup
  - Quarter-finals (1): 1968–69
- UEFA Conference League
  - Quarter-finals (1): 2025–26
- UEFA Cup Winners' Cup
  - Quarter-finals (2): 1996–97, 1997–98
- Balkans Cup
  - Runners-up (1): 1966–67

=== Regional ===
- Athens FCA Championship
  - Winners (5): 1939–40, 1942–43, 1945–46, 1946–47, 1949–50

Source: aekfc.gr

== Player records ==
Players in bold are currently playing for AEK Athens. Players in italics are still active not playing for AEK Athens.

=== Most appearances ===
==== All competitions ====
#	Name	Years	League	AFCA	Cup	Super Cup	League Cup	Europe	Balkans Cup	Total
1	(Greece) Stelios Manolas	1980–1998	447	0	**96**	4	4	38	4	593
2	(Greece) Mimis Papaioannou	1962–1979	**481**	0	54	0	0	35	13	583
3	(North Macedonia) Toni Savevski	1988–2001	357	0	82	**5**	3	48	0	495
4	(Greece) Andreas Stamatiadis	1951–1969	316	88	63	0	0	9	**16**	492
5	(Greece) **Petros Mantalos**	2014–	321	0	61	1	0	60	0	443
6	(Greece) Michalis Kasapis	1993–2004	254	0	67	3	0	**67**	0	391
7	(Greece) Ilias Atmatsidis	1992–2002	251	0	70	1	0	51	0	373
8	(Greece) Stelios Skevofilakas	1961–1972	308	0	31	0	0	14	13	366
9	(Greece) Lakis Nikolaou	1971–1982	295	0	36	0	0	30	0	361
10	(Greece) Thomas Mavros	1976–1987	278	0	41	0	0	26	1	345
11	(Greece) Stelios Serafidis	1953–1972	244	40	38	0	0	4	**16**	342
12	(Greece) Nikos Kostenoglou	1994–2005	222	0	62	0	0	49	0	334
13	(Greece) Petros Ravousis	1972–1984	264	0	33	0	0	24	1	322
14	(Greece) Pavlos Papaioannou	1984–1993	255	0	39	2	4	21	0	321
15	(Greece) Christos Ardizoglou	1974–1985	261	0	41	0	0	13	0	315
16	(Greece) Nikolaos Georgeas	2000–2012; 2013–2015	225	0	48	0	0	35	0	308
17	(Greece) Vasilios Tsiartas	1993–1996; 2000–2004	195	0	55	2	0	49	0	301
18	(Greece) Christos Maladenis	1995–2004	198	0	53	1	0	48	0	300
19	(Greece) Takis Karagiozopoulos	1981–1993	231	0	46	1	**5**	11	0	295
20	(Greece) Vaios Karagiannis	1990–2002	193	0	73	2	0	22	0	290

Last updated: 2026-11-08
Source: football.aek.com

==== Youngest players ====
This is a list of the youngest players that have debuted for AEK Athens in official competitions.

#	Name	Date	Opponent	Competition	Age at the time
1	(Greece) Taxiarchis Fountas	17/03/2012	Asteras Tripolis	Super League Greece	16 years, 6 months and 13 days
2	(Greece) Andreas Stamatiadis	30/03/1952	Panathinaikos	Greek Cup	16 years, 7 months and 14 days
3	(Greece) Ilias Tselios	21/05/2014	Pannaxiakos	Football League 2	16 years, 7 months and 15 days
4	(Greece) Panagiotis Tachtsidis	01/11/2007	Fostiras	Greek Cup	16 years, 8 months and 17 days
5	(Greece) Andreas Vlachomitros	21/05/2014	Pannaxiakos	Football League 2	16 years, 10 months and 18 days
6	(Greece) Giannis Vidalis	21/05/2014	Pannaxiakos	Football League 2	16 years, 11 months and 20 days
7	(Greece) Spyros Pomonis	12/03/1961	Aris	Alpha Ethniki	17 years and 26 days
8	(Albania) Mario Mitaj	18/10/2020	PAOK	Super League Greece	17 years, 2 months and 12 days
9	(Greece) Georgios Paligeorgos	13/05/2007	Panionios	Super League Greece	17 years, 3 months and 4 days
10	(Cyprus) Dimitris Froxylias	04/11/2010	Anderlecht	UEFA Europa League	17 years, 4 months and 7 days

==== Oldest players ====
This is a list of the oldest players that have played for AEK Athens in official competitions.

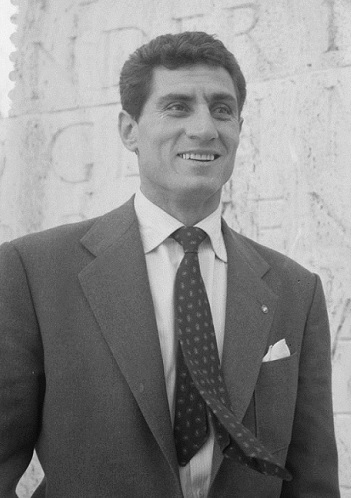
Küçükandonyadis is the oldest player to ever play and score for AEK Athens.

#	Name	Date	Opponent	Competition	Age at the time
1	(Turkey) Lefter Küçükandonyadis	11/10/1964	Iraklis	Alpha Ethniki	38 years, 10 months and 10 days
2	(Greece) Nikolaos Georgeas	07/06/2015	AEL	Football League	38 years, 5 months and 11 days
3	(Greece) Mimis Domazos	21/11/1979	Panachaiki	Greek Cup	37 years, 9 months and 30 days
4	(North Macedonia) Toni Savevski	21/01/2001	Skoda Xanthi	Alpha Ethniki	37 years, 7 months and 7 days
5	(Morocco) Nordin Amrabat	03/11/2024	Atromitos	Super League Greece	37 years, 7 months and 3 days
6	(Italy) Bruno Cirillo	21/05/2014	Pannaxiakos	Football League 2	37 years and 2 months
7	(Greece) Stelios Serafidis	11/06/1972	Panionios	Alpha Ethniki	36 years, 10 months and 5 days
8	(Greece) Stelios Manolas	17/05/1998	Skoda Xanthi	Alpha Ethniki	36 years, 10 months and 4 days
9	(Greece) Nikos Liberopoulos	20/05/2012	Panathinaikos	Super League Greece	36 years, 9 months and 16 days
10	(Greece) Tasos Mitropoulos	23/04/1994	OFI	Alpha Ethniki	36 years and 8 months

=== Top scorers ===
==== All competitions ====
#	Name	Years	League	AFCA	Cup	Super Cup	League Cup	Europe	Balkans Cup	Total
1	(Greece) Mimis Papaioannou	1962–1979	**236**	0	**45**	0	0	11	**9**	301
2	(Greece) Kostas Nestoridis	1955–1965	172	13	36	0	0	2	4	227
3	(Greece) Thomas Mavros	1976–1987	174	0	41	0	0	6	3	224
4	(Greece) Demis Nikolaidis	1996–2003	125	0	25	0	0	**26**	0	176
5	(Greece) Andreas Stamatiadis	1951–1969	78	27	33	0	0	1	1	140
6	(Greece) Kostas Nikolaidis	1965–1974	94	0	23	0	0	3	1	121
7	(Greece) Vasilios Tsiartas	1993–1996; 2000–2004	80	0	26	0	0	10	0	116
8	(Greece) Vasilis Dimitriadis	1991–1996	81	0	26	0	0	4	0	111
9	(Greece) Nikos Liberopoulos	2003–2008; 2010-2012	84	0	11	0	0	7	0	102
10	(Greece) Daniel Batista	1989–1992; 1995–1999	67	0	16	0	2	8	0	93
11	(Bosnia and Herzegovina) Dušan Bajević	1977–1981	65	0	23	0	0	3	0	91
12	(Greece) Kleanthis Maropoulos	1934–1952	9	**54**	26	0	0	0	0	89
13	(Greece) Christos Kostis	1994–1998; 2000–2005	56	0	13	0	0	3	0	72
13	(Argentina) Ismael Blanco	2007–2011	55	0	9	0	0	8	0	72
15	(Greece) **Petros Mantalos**	2014–	44	0	19	0	0	7	0	70
16	(Greece) Giannis Kanakis	1949–1960	16	40	13	0	0	0	0	69
17	(North Macedonia) Toni Savevski	1988–2001	52	0	10	0	0	6	0	68
17	(Greece) Alexis Alexandris	1991–1994	49	0	16	**1**	0	2	0	68
19	(Greece) Kostas Papageorgiou	1964–1969	53	0	11	0	0	1	1	66
20	(Cyprus) Tasos Konstantinou	1972–1980	52	0	7	0	0	6	0	65
20	(Greece) Vasilios Lakis	1998–2004; 2005–2007	42	0	14	0	0	8	0	65

Last updated: 2026-11-08
Source: football.aek.com

==== League top scorers ====
#	Name	Times	Season(s)
1	(Greece) Kostas Nestoridis	5	1958–59, 1959–60, 1960–61, 1961–62, 1962–63
2	(Greece) Thomas Mavros	3	1977–78, 1978–79, 1984–85
3	(Greece) Mimis Papaioannou	2	1963–64, 1965–66
4	(Greece) Vasilis Dimitriadis	2	1991–92, 1992–93
5	(Argentina) Ismael Blanco	2	2007–08, 2008–09
6	(Cyprus) Kostas Vasiliou	1	1938–39
7	(Greece) Kleanthis Maropoulos	1	1939–40
8	(Greece) Georgios Dedes	1	1975–76
9	(Bosnia and Herzegovina) Dušan Bajević	1	1979–80
10	(Denmark) Henrik Nielsen	1	1987–88
11	(Greece) Alexis Alexandris	1	1993–94
12	(Greece) Vasilios Tsiartas	1	1995–96
13	(Greece) Demis Nikolaidis	1	1998–99
14	(Greece) Nikos Liberopoulos	1	2006–07

==== Youngest goalscorers ====
This list includes the youngest players that have scored for AEK Athens in official competitions.

#	Name	Date	Opponent	Competition	Age at the time
1	(Greece) Andreas Stamatiadis	08/06/1952	Apollon Athens	AFCA League	16 years, 9 months and 23 days
2	(Greece) Andreas Vlachomitros	21/05/2014	Pannaxiakos	Football League 2	16 years, 10 months and 18 days
3	(Greece) Taxiarchis Fountas	28/10/2012	Platanias	Super League Greece	17 years, 1 month and 24 days
4	(Greece) Sokratis Papastathopoulos	26/10/2005	PAS Giannina	Greek Cup	17 years, 4 months and 17 days
5	(Greece) Giannis Fivos Botos	31/10/2018	Apollon Larissa	Greek Cup	17 years, 10 months and 11 days
6	(Greece) Vangelis Vlachos	26/12/1979	Kavala	Alpha Ethniki	17 years, 11 months and 20 days
7	(Greece) Giannis Sardelis	31/10/2018	Apollon Larissa	Greek Cup	17 years, 11 months and 28 days
8	(Greece) Panagiotis Tachtsidis	14/02/2009	Thrasyvoulos	Super League Greece	17 years, 11 months and 30 days
9	(Greece) Michalis Pavlis	12/01/2008	Veria	Super League Greece	18 years, 3 months and 21 days
10	(Greece) Dimitris Dimitriadis	07/09/1986	Panionios	Alpha Ethniki	18 years, 5 months and 17 days

==== Oldest goalscorers ====
This list includes the oldest players that have scored for AEK Athens in official competitions.

#	Name	Date	Opponent	Competition	Age at the time
1	(Turkey) Lefter Küçükandonyadis	11/10/1964	Apollon Smyrnis	Alpha Ethniki	38 years, 9 months and 19 days
2	(Morocco) Nordin Amrabat	29/09/2024	Panathinaikos	Super League Greece	37 years, 5 months and 29 days
3	(Greece) Mimis Domazos	03/06/1979	PAS Giannina	Alpha Ethniki	37 years, 4 months and 12 days
4	(North Macedonia) Toni Savevski	21/05/2000	Trikala	Alpha Ethniki	36 years, 11 months and 7 days
5	(Greece) Nikos Liberopoulos	16/05/2012	PAOK	Super League Greece	36 years, 9 months and 12 days
6	(Greece) Mimis Papaioannou	25/04/1979	Rodos	Alpha Ethniki	36 years, 5 months and 8 days
7	(Greece) Tasos Mitropoulos	10/11/1993	Paniliakos	Greek Cup	36 years, 2 months and 18 days
8	(Brazil) Rivaldo	11/05/2008	Panionios	Super League Greece	36 years and 22 days
9	(Greece) Stelios Manolas	21/04/1997	Veria	Alpha Ethniki	35 years, 9 months and 8 days
10	(Greece) Kostas Nestoridis	04/12/1965	Proodeftiki	Alpha Ethniki	35 years, 8 months and 19 days

== Awards ==
=== Player Awards ===
==== Super League ====
- Greek Player of the Season
  - (Greece) Spyros Ikonomopoulos: (1) 1988–89
  - (Greece) Stelios Manolas: (1) 1992–93
  - (Greece) Alexis Alexandris: (1) 1993–94
  - (Greece) Michalis Kasapis: (1) 1994–95
  - (Greece) Vasilios Tsiartas: (1) 1995–96
  - (Greece) Christos Kostis: (1) 1996–97
  - (Greece) Demis Nikolaidis: (3) 1996–97, 1997–98, 2001–02
  - (Greece) Kostas Katsouranis: (1) 2004–05
  - (Greece) Nikos Liberopoulos: (2) 2005–06, 2006–07
  - (Greece) Petros Mantalos: (1) 2016–17
  - (Greece) Lazaros Christodoulopoulos: (1) 2017–18
- Foreign Player of the Season
  - (North Macedonia) Toni Savevski: (1) 1991–92
  - (Georgia (country)) Temur Ketsbaia: (1) 1995–96
  - (Argentina) Ismael Blanco: (1) 2007–08
  - (Mexico) Orbelín Pineda: (2) 2022–23, 2025–26
- Young Player of the Season
  - (Greece) Michalis Kasapis: (1) 1993–94
  - (Greece) Sokratis Papastathopoulos: (1) 2007–08
- Goalkeeper of the Season
  - (Greece) Ilias Atmatsidis: (2) 1997–98, 1998–99
  - (Albania) Thomas Strakosha: (1) 2025–26
- Team of the Season
  - (Brazil) Rodrigo Galo: (1) 2015–16
  - (Greece) Petros Mantalos: (1) 2016–17
  - (Ukraine) Dmytro Chyhrynskyi: (1) 2017–18
  - (Portugal) André Simões: (1) 2017–18
  - (Greece) Lazaros Christodoulopoulos: (1) 2017–18
  - (Croatia) Marko Livaja: (2) 2017–18, 2019–20
  - (Trinidad and Tobago) Levi García: (2) 2021–22, 2022–23
  - (Argentina) Sergio Araujo: (1) 2021–22
  - (Cameroon) Harold Moukoudi: (1) 2022–23
  - (Iran) Ehsan Hajsafi: (1) 2022–23
  - (Serbia) Mijat Gaćinović: (1) 2022–23
  - (Mexico) Orbelín Pineda: (3) 2022–23, 2023–24, 2025–26
  - (Croatia) Domagoj Vida: (1) 2023–24
  - (Sweden) Niclas Eliasson: (1) 2023–24
  - (Albania) Thomas Strakosha: (1) 2025–26
  - (Portugal) Filipe Relvas: (1) 2025–26
  - (Greece) Lazaros Rota: (1) 2025–26
  - (Romania) Răzvan Marin: (1) 2025–26
  - (Serbia) Luka Jović: (1) 2025–26

==== Football league ====
- Greek Player of the Season
  - (Greece) Christos Aravidis: (1) 2014–15
- Foreign Player of the Season
  - (Sweden) Jakob Johansson: (1) 2014–15
- Young Player of the Season
  - (Greece) Adam Tzanetopoulos: (1) 2014–15

=== Manager Awards ===
==== Super League ====
- Manager of the Season
  - (Bosnia and Herzegovina) Dušan Bajević: (5) 1991–92, 1992–93, 1993–94, 1995–96, 2002–03
  - (Portugal) Fernando Santos: (2) 2001–02, 2004–05
  - (Spain) Manolo Jiménez: (1) 2017–18
  - (Argentina) Matías Almeyda: (1) 2022–23
  - (Serbia) Marko Nikolić: (1) 2025–26

==== Football League ====
- Manager of the Season
  - (Greece) Traianos Dellas: (1) 2014–15

=== Other Awards ===
- Fair Play Prize
  - (Greece) Michalis Kasapis: (1) 2001–02
  - (Argentina) Sergio Araujo: (1) 2021–22

== Team records ==
=== Greece ===
- Most goals scored in a season:
  - 123 goals scored in the 1978–79 season: 90 for the League, 24 for the Cup and 9 for the European Cup.
- Most goals scored by a footballer in a single league match: 5
  - (Greece) Kostas Nestoridis, against Iraklis on 3 June 1963 (5–0).
  - (Greece) Thomas Mavros, against Egaleo on 27 January 1985 (5–2).
  - (Greece) Demis Nikolaidis, against Kalamata on 23 February 1997 (6–1).
- Most goals scored by a footballer in a single AFCA championship match: 6
  - (Greece) Kleanthis Maropoulos, against Olympiacos Athens on 22 October 1939 (0–13).
- Most goals scored by a footballer in a single Cup match: 7
  - (Greece) Andreas Papaemmanouil, against Kipoupoli on 13 September 1970 (20–0).
- Longest consecutive unbeaten matches in Super League Greece:
  - 25 games (23 October 2017 to 23 September 2018)
- Longest consecutive unbeaten matches in all competitions:
  - 26 games (23 October 2017 to 1 March 2018)
- Least league goals concieded in a season:
  - 12 goals, in 2017–18 season (30 games) (domestic record)
- Consecutive league titles:
  - Won 3 championship titles: 1991–92, 1992–93, 1993–94 seasons.
- Consecutive knock-out qualifications in Greek Cup:
  - 15 qualifications: 2015–16, 2016–17, 2017–18, 2018–19, 2019–20 seasons. (5 consecutive presences in the Cup Final) (domestic record)

=== Europe ===
- Consecutive draws in the group stage of the UEFA Champions League:
  - 6 draws in the 2002–03 season. (european record)
- Participation in the quarter-final round European competitions at least once.
  - 3 European competitions' quarter finals: (domestic record)
    - European Cup in the 1968–69 season.
    - UEFA Cup in the 1976–77 season.
    - UEFA Cup Winners' Cup in the 1996–97 and 1997–98 season.
- Best European Cup/UEFA Champions League season:
  - Quarter-finals in the 1968–69 season.
- Best UEFA Cup/UEFA Europa League season:
  - Semi-finals in the 1976–77 season. (domestic record)
- Best UEFA Conference League season:
  - Quarter-finals in the 2025–26 season.
- Best UEFA Cup Winners' Cup season:
  - Quarter-finals in the 1996–97 and 1997–98 season.
- Best Balkans Cup season:
  - Runners-up in the 1966–67 season.
- Longest consecutive unbeaten matches in the group stage of the UEFA Champions League:
  - 6 games in the 2002–03 season. (domestic record)
- Longest consecutive unbeaten matches in the group stage of the UEFA Europa League:
  - 6 games in the 2017–18 season.
- Consecutive participations in the quarter-final of European competitions:
  - 2 consecutive quarter−finals: UEFA Cup Winners' Cup in the 1996–97 and the 1997–98 season. (domestic record)
- Consecutive participations in the round of 16 of European competitions:
  - 4 consecutive seasons: (domestic record)
    - 1994–95 season in the UEFA Champions League.
    - 1995–96, 1996–97 and 1997–98 season in the UEFA Cup Winners' Cup.
- Consecutive participations in the round of 16 of the UEFA Cup Winners' Cup:
  - 3 consecutive seasons: 1995–96, 1996–97 and 1997–98 season. (domestic record)
- Consecutive participations in the round of 16 of the UEFA Cup:
  - 3 consecutive seasons: 2000–01, 2001–02 and 2002–03 season. (domestic record)
- European unbeaten seasons in the group stage:
  - 2 seasons:
    - UEFA Champions League in the 2002–03 season.
    - UEFA Europa League in the 2017–18 season.
- First Greek club to participate in the UEFA Champions League.
  - AEK Athens participated in the UEFA Champions League in the 1992–93 season.
- First Greek club to participate in the group stage of the UEFA Champions League.
  - AEK Athens participated in the group stage of the UEFA Champions League in the 1994–95 season.
- First Greek club that reached the quarter-finals of the European Cup.
  - AEK Athens reached the quarter-finals of the European Cup in the 1968–69 season.
- The only Greek club that reached the quarter-finals of the every UEFA competition.
  - AEK Athens reached the quarter-finals of the European Cup in the 1968–69 season.
  - AEK Athens reached the quarter-finals of the UEFA Cup in the 1976–77 season.
  - AEK Athens reached the quarter-finals of the UEFA Cup Winners' Cup in the 1996–97 season.
  - AEK Athens reached the quarter-finals of the Conference League in the 2025–26 season.

==== European competition runs ====
- Consecutive European games won:
  - 4 games in the knock-out stages of the Cup Winners' Cup in the 1996–97 season.
- Consecutive European games drawn:
  - 8 games: From the group stage and in the round of 32 of the UEFA Europa League in the 2017–18 season to the 3rd qualifying round of the UEFA Champions League in the 2018–19 season. (domestic record)
- Consecutive European games lost:
  - 6 games in the group stage of the UEFA Champions League in 2018–19 season. (domestic record)
- Consecutive European games without a win:
  - 7 games: From the group stage of the UEFA Champions League in the 2003–04 season to the first round of the UEFA Cup in 2004–05 season. (3 draws and 4 defeats from 17 September 2003 to 30 September 2004)
- Consecutive European games without a draw:
  - 20 games: From the second round of the UEFA Cup in the 1977–78 season to the second round of the European Cup in the 1989–90 season. (6 wins and 14 losses from 2 November 1977 to 1 November 1989.)
- Consecutive European games without a loss:
  - 14 games: From the UEFA Europa League in the 2017–18 season to the qualification rounds for the UEFA Champions League in the 2018–19 season. (4 wins and 10 draws from 17 August 2017 to 19 September 2018) (domestic record)
- Consecutive European home games won:
  - 6 games from the first round of the UEFA Cup in the 1975–76 season to the quarter–finals of the UEFA Cup in the 1976–77 season.
- Consecutive European home games drawn:
  - 4 games in the UEFA Europa League in the 2017–18 season.
- Consecutive European home games lost:
  - 5 games: From the group stage of the UEFA Europa League in the 2011–12 season to the third qualifying round for the UEFA Champions League in the 2017–18 season.
- Consecutive European home games without a win:
  - 6 games in the UEFA Champions League in the 2018–19 season.
- Consecutive European home games without a draw:
  - 13 games: From the first round of the Inter-Cities Fairs Cup in the 1970–71 season to the first round of the UEFA Cup in the 1977–78 season. (10 wins and 3 losses from 2 September 1970 to 19 October 1977.)
- Consecutive European home games without a loss:
  - 12 games: From the first round of the UEFA Cup Winners' Cup in the 1997–98 season to the third round of the UEFA Cup in the 2000–01 season. (8 wins and 4 draws from 18 September 1997 to 15 February 2001.)
- Consecutive European away games won:
  - 2 games in the UEFA Cup Winners' Cup in the 1996–97 season and in the qualification rounds of the UEFA Europa League in the 2019–20 season.
- Consecutive European away games drawn:
  - 3 games in the UEFA Champions League in the 2002–03 season and in the UEFA Europa League in the 2017–18 season.
- Consecutive European away games lost:
  - 15 games: From the third round of the UEFA Cup in the 1976–77 season to the second round of the European Cup in the 1989–90 season. (from 2 November 1977 to 18 September 1991.)
- Consecutive European away games without a win:
  - 15 games: From the third round of the UEFA Cup in the 1976–77 season to the second round of the European Cup in the 1989–90 season. (from 2 November 1977 to 18 September 1991.)
- Consecutive European away games without a draw:
  - 19 games: From the second round of the UEFA Cup in the 1975–76 season to the first round of the UEFA Cup in the 1990–91 season. (2 wins and 17 losses from 22 October 1975 to 23 October 1991.)
- Consecutive European away games without a loss:
  - 7 games: From the play-off round of the UEFA Europa League in the 2017–18 season to the play-off round for the UEFA Champions League in the 2018–19 season. (4 wins and 3 draws from 17 August 2017 to 19 September 2018)
- Consecutive European games in which AEK scored:
  - 12 games
- Consecutive European games in which AEK conceded:
  - 8 games
- Consecutive European games without scoring:
  - 5 games: From the 3rd qualifying round of the UEFA Europa League in the 2016–17 season to the play-off round for the UEFA Europa League in the 2017–18 season. (28 July 2016 – 24 August 2017)
- Consecutive European games without conceding:
  - 3 games

=== Record wins ===
==== League ====
22 October 1939 Matchday 4 (Note: AFCA league.)	Olympiacos Athens	0–13	AEK Athens
		Report	Maropoulos; Koutsoulieris

3 November 1929 Matchday 4	Athinaikos	0–12	AEK Athens	Rouf
		Report	Iliaskos; Mougras; Negrepontis; Pantermalis	Stadium: Rouf Municipal Stadium

21 May 1930 Matchday 10	Palaio Faliro	0–8	AEK Athens	Piraeus
		Report	Goal	Stadium: Velodrome

9 September 1961 Matchday 1	Egaleo	0–8	AEK Athens	Rizoupoli
16:30 EET		Report	Gouvas 31', 89'; Nestoridis 40', 43', 88'; Petridis 75'; Stamatiadis 80', 85'	Stadium: Georgios Kamaras Stadium; Attendance: 8,575; Referee: Manolis Panakis (Athens)
Note: Record away win in the history of Greek Championship.

15 November 1936 Matchday 1	AEK Athens	8–0	Goudi	Nea Filadelfeia
	Maropoulos; Christodoulou; Manettas; Tzanetis; Sofianopoulos	Report		Stadium: Nikos Goumas Stadium

13 January 1946 Matchday 1	AEK Athens	8–0	Arion Kolonaki	Nea Filadelfeia
	Tzanetis 15', 25'; Magiras 35' (pen.); Maropoulos 60', 70', 87'; Saratsoglou 75'; Markopoulos 90'	Report		Stadium: Nikos Goumas Stadium

10 December 1989 Matchday 13	AEK Athens	8–0	Xanthi	Nea Filadelfeia
14:45 EET	Christodoulou 28', 52', 64'; Patikas 31', 43'; Okonski 72'; Famelis 77'; Karagiozopoulos 89' (pen.)	Report		Stadium: Nikos Goumas Stadium; Attendance: 9,587; Referee: Lefteris Fillipidis (Patra)

1 February 2014 Matchday 16 (Note: Third division.)	AEK Athens	8–0	Mandraikos	Marousi
15:00 EET	Brecevic 15', 29', 39'; Anakoglou 46', 55'; Platellas 64'; Petavrakis 70'; Christoulakis 89' (o.g.)	Report		Stadium: Olympic Stadium; Attendance: Behind closed doors Referee: Panagiotis Kekelios (Aetoloacarnania)

16 February 2014 Matchday 18	AEK Athens	8–1	Peristeri	Marousi
15:00 EET	Brečević 7', 11'; Platellas 26', 54', 75'; D'Acol 38', 73'; Popovic 51'	Report	Belis 58'	Stadium: Olympic Stadium; Attendance: Behind closed doors Referee: Kostas Topros (Kerkyra)

4 November 1996 Matchday 7	Athinaikos	0–7	AEK Athens	Vyronas
15:00 EET		Report	Ketsbaia 33'; Nikolaidis 44', 90+1'; Savevski 50' (pen.); Kostis 56', 65'; Kopitsis 87'	Stadium: Vyronas National Stadium; Attendance: 2,254; Referee: Thanasis Zachariadis (Thessaloniki)

22 January 1961 Matchday 14	AEK Athens	7–0	Atromitos Piraeus	Nea Filadelfeia
15:00 EET	Ampos 28'; Nestoridis 40', 51', 80'; Petridis 53'; Demiris 70'; Stamatiadis 74'	Report		Stadium: Nikos Goumas Stadium; Referee: Spanos (Patra)

27 May 1979 Matchday 33	AEK Athens	7–0	Kavala	Nea Filadelfeia
17:00 EEST	Bajević 7', 23'; Mavros 15', 21', 42' (pen.); Konstantinou 58'; Nikoloudis 80'	Report		Stadium: Nikos Goumas Stadium; Attendance: 10,306; Referee: Grippas (Patra)

12 December 1992 Matchday 13	AEK Athens	7–0	Korinthos	Nea Filadelfeia
16:30 EET	Dimitriadis 6', 75'; Slišković 12', 80'; Mitropoulos 15'; Tsiartas 47', 52'	Report		Stadium: Nikos Goumas Stadium; Attendance: 6,939; Referee: Vassilios Nikakis (Aetoloacarnania)

7 December 2014 Matchday 7 (Note: Second division.)	AEK Athens	7–0	Episkopi	Marousi
18:00 EET	Brečević 22', 75'; Mantalos 12', 39', 81' (pen.); Barbosa 24'; Platellas 57'	Report		Stadium: Olympic Stadium; Attendance: 7,951; Referee: Nikos Roussos-Bekertzis (Preveza)

==== Cup ====
13 September 1970 First round	AEK Athens	20–0	Kipoupoli	Nea Ionia
15:30 EET	Skevofilakas 5', 19', 41'; Papaemmanouil 6', 9', 14' (pen.), 61', 72', 77', 89'; Papaioannou 42'; Lavaridis 50', 54', 62'; Palasidis 53'; Ventouris 57' (pen.); Theodoridis 64'; Pomonis 70', 87', 90'	Report		Stadium: Municipal Stadium of Nea Ionia; Referee: Spiliotopoulos

9 October 1949 Qualification round	AEK Athens	12–0	Niki Ampelokipon	Nea Filadelfeia
15:30 EET	Chrorozoglou 5' (o.g.); Lazaridis 17', 65'; Kountouris 26', 38', 56'; Maropoulos 31', 80', 86'; Chatzivardeas 36', 71'; Emmanouilidis 79'	Report		Stadium: Nikos Goumas Stadium; Attendance: 3,000; Referee: Samartzis

30 September 1970 Second round	AEK Athens	10–0	Agia Eleousa	Rizoupoli
15:30 EET	Nikolaidis 10', 60'; Lavaridis 40', 88'; Papaioannou 47', 70', 75', 85'; Papaemmanouil 52'; Ventouris 63'	Report		Stadium: Rizoupoli Stadium; Referee: Karpodinis (Piraeus)

6 November 1985 First round	AEK Athens	10–0	Ilioupoli	Marousi
15:00 EET	Esterházy 15', 27', 38'; Ballis 18', 63'; Dintsikos 41', 86'; Karagiozopoulos 45'; Sandberg 53' (pen.), 61'	Report		Stadium: Olympic Stadium; Attendance: 1,653; Referee: Nikos Kapetanakis (Piraeus)

11 December 1960 First round	AEK Athens	9–0	AE Kesarianis	Nea Filadelfeia
	Emmanouilidis; Stamatiadis; Tsachouridis; Demiris; Ampos	Report		Stadium: Nikos Goumas Stadium

3 January 1973 Round of 32	AEK Athens	9–0	Ethnikos Asteras	Nea Filadelfeia
14:30 EET	Pomonis 6'; Karafeskos 18'; Papaioannou 38', 75'; Nikolaidis 44', 52', 55', 86'; Karypidis 67'	Report		Stadium: Nikos Goumas Stadium; Attendance: 2,292; Referee: Kostas Dikopoulos (Larissa)

30 January 1949 Round of 16	Ergotelis	1–9	AEK Athens	Heraklion
15:00 EET	Liberis 12'	Report	Markopoulos 22', 31', 50', 63'; Maropoulos 30', 65', 68', 70'; Emmanouilidis 62'	Stadium: Nikos Kazantzakis Stadium; Referee: Dimopoulos

9 November 1949 Qualification round	AEK Athens	9–1	Sparta Pertalonon	Nea Filadelfeia
15:00 EET	Chatzivardeas 7'; Poulis 11'; Emmanouilidis 23', 80'; Lazaridis 25', 48'; Maropoulos 35', 50', 66'	Report	Kois 77'	Stadium: Nikos Goumas Stadium; Referee: Papalexopoulos

6 September 2000 Group Stage	AEK Athens	9–1	Olympiacos Volos	Nea Filadelfeia
18:30 EET	Maladenis 5', 37'; Lakis 36', 52', 73'; Tsiartas 40', 80'; Konstantinidis 47', 57'	Report	Manta 75'	Stadium: Nikos Goumas Stadium; Attendance: 1,016; Referee: Manolis Giannadakis (Lasithi)

20 February 1957 Qualification round	AEK Athens	8–0	Aris Pangrati	Nea Filadelfeia
15:15 EET	Stamatiadis 17', 77'; Melissis 18'; Ampos 32'; Emmanouilidis 40', 62', 85'; Chaniotis 88'	Report		Stadium: Nikos Goumas Stadium

17 August 2000 Group Stage	AEK Athens	8–0	Ethnikos Piraeus	Nea Filadelfeia
11:00 EET	Navas 28', 41'; Nikolaidis 34' (pen.), 62', 65', 76'; Konstantinidis 86', 89'	Report (page 32)		Stadium: Nikos Goumas Stadium; Attendance: 1,063; Referee: Giorgos Tsangarakis (Chania)

15 March 1961 Fifth round	AEK Athens	8–1	Niki Plaka	Nea Filadelfeia
15:00 EET	Zagotsis 13', 46', 65'; Demiris 42', 78'; Stamatiadis 51', 60', 70'	Report	Sofianidis 63' (o.g.)	Stadium: Nikos Goumas Stadium; Referee: Alexandros Monastiriotis (Piraeus)

17 September 2026 League Phase	AEK Athens	8–1	Panserraikos	Nea Filadelfeia
17:45 EEST (UTC+3)	Alexiou 9', 84'; Varga 33', 38'; João Mário 35'; Vitális 44'; Mantalos 45+1'; Zubkov 72'	Report	Iliadis 90+1'	Stadium: Agia Sophia Stadium; Referee: Spyros Zabalas (Epirus)

19 February 1939 Round of 16	AEK Athens	7–0	Aris Piraeus	Nea Filadelfeia
15:30 EET	Manettas; Chatzistavridis; Maropoulos; Tzanetis	Report		Stadium: Nikos Goumas Stadium; Referee: Sotiris Aprogerakas (Athens)

13 January 1960 Fourth round	AEK Athens	7–0	PAO Kalogreza	Nea Filadelfeia
EET	Emmanouilidis; Nestoridis; Stamatiadis; Marditsis	Report		Stadium: Nikos Goumas Stadium; Referee: Vasilis Dimopoulos (Athens)

26 April 1964 Round of 32	Anagennisi Arta	0–7	AEK Athens	Arta
16:00 EET		Report	Papageorgiou 18', 67'; Papaioannou 30', 49', 78'; Petridis 40'; Stamatiadis 87'	Stadium: Arta Stadium; Attendance: 5,000; Referee: Alexandros Monastiriotis (Piraeus)

2 November 1975 First round	AEK Athens	7–0	Agios Dimitrios	Nea Filadelfeia
14:30 EET	Wagner 7', 75'; Dedes 10'; Tsamis 32'; Papaioannou 40', 50', 71'	Report		Stadium: Nikos Goumas Stadium; Referee: Giorgos Moschopoulos (Thessaloniki)

25 August 1993 Group Stage	Keratsini	0–7	AEK Athens	Piraeus
16:00 EET		Report	Stamatis 17', 87'; Alexandris 30', 46', 53' (pen.); Slišković 80'; Konstantinidis 48'	Stadium: Georgios Karaiskakis Stadium; Referee: Babis Rigas (Athens)

26 October 2017 Group Stage	Apollon Larissa	0–7	AEK Athens	Larissa
19:30 EET		Report	Tzanetopoulos 19'; Christodoulopoulos 22', 42'; Ajdarević 36'; Bakasetas 40'; Araujo 51'; Traustason 79'	Stadium: Alcazar Stadium; Referee: Vasilis Fotias (Pella)

5 February 1956 Round of 32	Achilleas Korinthos	2–8	AEK Athens	Corinth
16:00 EET	Vasilopoulos 4'; Mantas 82'	Report	Adamantidis 10', 19', 30'; Kanakis 14'; Melissis 43', 77'; Poulis 65'; Chaniotis (?)	Stadium: Korinthos Stadium

14 October 1959 Qualification round	AEK Athens	7–1	Victoria	Nea Filadelfeia
EET	Nestoridis 1', 10', 67', 75'; Kanakis 30'; Stamatiadis 53'; Petridis 85'	Report	Goal	Stadium: Nikos Goumas Stadium; Attendance: 2,000; Referee: Alexandros Monastiriotis (Piraeus)

19 May 1963 Round of 32	AEK Athens	7–1	Olympiacos Kalamata	Nea Filadelfeia
17:00 EET	Zagylos 3'; Nestoridis 14', 30', 74'; Ibrahim 56', 90'; Stamatiadis 77'	Report	Korogonas 49' (pen.)	Stadium: Nikos Goumas Stadium; Referee: Vangelis Vernardakis (Piraeus)

29 December 1993 Third round	Asteras Ambelokipoi	1–7	AEK Athens	Thessaloniki
14:15 EET	Nasiopoulos 89'	Report	Dimitriadis 23' (pen.); Slišković 30', 33', 65', 73'; Tsartas 55', 60'; Kostis 89'	Stadium: Ampelokipoi-Menemeni Stadium; Attendance: 2,000; Referee: Konstantinos Karapatas (Corinthia)

15 May 1996 Final	Apollon Athens	1–7	AEK Athens	Marousi
17:30 EET	Barnjak 78'	Report (page 5)	Batista 11', 34'; Tsartas 22', 48' (pen.), 76'; Ketsbaia 60'; Kostis 89'	Stadium: Olympic Stadium; Attendance: 31,563; Referee: Christos Sotiropoulos (Piraeus)
Note: Record win in the history of the Greek Cup finals.

==== Unofficial ====
26 July 1992 Friendly	Hellas Schierstein	2–25	AEK Athens	Wil
18:30 EEST (UTC+3)	Koustidakos 87'; Tsachpinis 89'	Report	Dimitriadis 10', 22', 24', 36', 40', 42', 45'; Alexandris 26', 33'; Patikas 34', 38'; Paço 48', 52', 67'; Mitropoulos 55', 86'; Kakiousos 57', 58'; Koutoulas 59', 70', 80'; Georgiadis 71'; Ladogiannis 79'; Loukinas 84'; Karagiozopoulos 90'	Stadium: Wil Training Center; Attendance: 2,000

1 September 1979 Friendly	AEK Athens	21–0	Palia Kokkinia	Nea Filadelfeia
17:00 EEST (UTC+3)	Chatziioannidis; Thodis; Kaselakis; Vlachos; Thanopoulos; Konstantinou; Stylianopoulos; Zografos; Papachatzakis	Report		Stadium: AEK Stadium

20 July 1994 Friendly	Pontos München	0–17	AEK Athens	Munich
20:30 EEST (UTC+3)		Report	Dimitriadis; Tsiartas; Borbokis; Agorogiannis; Šabanadžović; Mirtsekis; Kostis; Saravakos; Koutoulas

20 July 1991 Friendly	Kirchen-Hausen	1–16	AEK Athens
18:00 EEST (UTC+3)	Fritsch 6'	Report	Dimitriadis 11', 20', 30', 41'; Patikas 16'; Alexandris 28', 43'; Manolas 35'; Savvidis 38', 44'; Klopas 50', 77'; Stamatis 55', 86'; Chatzis 57'; Georgiadis 82'
Note: With the team of Kirchen-Hausen also used players from Disiegen and Buchhausen.

10 August 1983 Friendly	FC Esslingen	0–15	AEK Athens	Stuttgart
19:30 EEST (UTC+3)		Report	Langley 9', 37', 39'; Mavros 11', 13', 71'; Weiss 21' (o.g.); Vlachos 25', 57', 65', 68'; Ross 52'; Paraprastanitis 69'; Dintsikos 71'; Kottis 81'	Attendance: 1,000; Referee: Sweikart (West Germany)

25 July 1987 Friendly	DSC	0–14	AEK Athens	Zaterntant
20:00 EEST (UTC+3)		Report	Nielsen 2', 46', 64'; Manolas 28'; Patikas 31', 38'; Vasilakos 33', 85'; Georgiadis 35'; Savvidis 53', 79'; Janjanin 63', 74' (pen.), 90'

10 February 1966 Friendly	AEK Athens	14–0	Panionikos	Nea Filadelfeia
15:30 EET (UTC+2)	Papageorgiou; Stamatiadis; Karafeskos; Papaioannou; Simigdalas; Skevofilakas; Nikolaidis; Pomonis	Report		Stadium: AEK Stadium
Note: Petrakis compteted with both clubs throughout the second half.

1 November 1979 Friendly	AEK Athens	14–1	AO Moschato	Nea Filadelfeia
15:00 EET (UTC+2)	Hatziloizou 7', 14', 72'; Kaselakis 17', 20', 81'; Chatziioannidis 24', 30'; Ardizoglou 32', 34', 36', 66'; Nikoloudis 67'; Nikolaou 73' (pen.)	Report	Valvis 49'	Stadium: AEK Stadium; Attendance: 1,000

4 August 1999 Friendly	AEK Athens	13–0	Ilisiakos	Thrakomakedones
18:30 EEST (UTC+3)	Bjeković 16'; Milovanović 33'; Dellas 51'; Konstantinidis 54', 77', 80'; Sebwe 55', 58', 65'; Grétarsson 63', 66', 83'; Kavazis 68'	Report		Stadium: AEK Athens' Training Complex; Referee: Tasos Dimou
Note: The fitness coach of AEK, Tasos Dimou who was the referee of the match ended the match at the 84th minute.

26 July 1982 Friendly	Obergrombach	0–12	AEK Athens	Freiburg
19:00 EEST (UTC+3)		Report	Vlachos 15', 23', 50', 62', 86'; Ballis 22', 26', 77'; Angelidis 55'; Karavitis 66'; Manolas 75'; Paraprastanitis 82'	Attendance: 2,000; Referee: Schwabeland (West Germany)

16 December 1965 Friendly	AEK Athens	12–0	Eleftheroupoli	Nea Filadelfeia
	Papageorgiou; Nikolaidis; Skevofilakas; Stamatiadis; Pomonis	Report		Stadium: AEK Stadium

24 February 1966 Friendly	AEK Athens	12–0	Spyros Louis	Nea Filadelfeia
	Papageorgiou; Papaioannou; Karafeskos; Pomonis; Simigdalas; Nikolaidis; Stamatiadis	Report		Stadium: Nikos Goumas Stadium; Referee: Georgios Magiras

24 April 1966 Friendly	AEK Athens	12–0	Levadiakos	Nea Filadelfeia
16:30 EET (UTC+2)	Simigdalas 9'; Stamatiadis 19'; Papaioannou 22', 57', 59', 77'; Nikolaidis 43', 82', 84'; Tasinos 76'; Karafeskos 80', 88'	Report		Stadium: AEK Stadium

=== Attendance records ===
Date	Stadium	Competition	Opponent	Attendance	Ref
09/02/1986	Athens Olympic Stadium	Alpha Ethniki	(Greece) Olympiacos	74,465	
27/04/1986	Athens Olympic Stadium	Alpha Ethniki	(Greece) Panathinaikos	64,542	
11/03/2015	Athens Olympic Stadium	Greek Cup	(Greece) Olympiacos	64,256	
07/11/2004	Athens Olympic Stadium	Alpha Ethniki	(Greece) Olympiacos	63,129	
23/10/2018	Athens Olympic Stadium	UEFA Champions League	(Germany) Bayern Munich	56,865	
21/11/2006	Athens Olympic Stadium	UEFA Champions League	(Italy) AC Milan	56,203	
02/10/1986	Athens Olympic Stadium	UEFA Cup	(Italy) Internazionale	55,186	
14/09/1985	Athens Olympic Stadium	Alpha Ethniki	(Greece) PAOK	54,800	
11/05/1986	Athens Olympic Stadium	Greek Cup	(Greece) Panathinaikos	52,284	
22/04/2018	Athens Olympic Stadium	Super League Greece	(Greece) Levadiakos	50,141	

- The attendance record in the old homeground of AEK Athens, Nikos Goumas Stadium was 36,766 spectators, which occurred on 30/11/1980 in a league match against Panathinaikos.
- The attendance record in the original homeground of AEK Athens, Agia Sophia Stadium is 31,100 spectators, which occurred on:
  - 13/10/2022, in a league match against Ionikos.
  - 30/10/2022, in a league match against PAOK.
  - 08/01/2023, in a league match against Panathinaikos.
  - 12/03/2023, in a league match against Olympiacos.
  - 03/05/2023, in a league match against Olympiacos.
  - 14/05/2023, in a league match against Volos.
  - 31/03/2024, in a league match against Olympiacos.
  - 24/04/2024, in a league match against Panathinaikos.
  - 19/05/2024, in a league match against Lamia.
  - 01/02/2026, in a league match against Olympiacos.
  - 16/04/2026, in a UEFA Conference League match against Rayo Vallecano.
  - 19/04/2026, in a league match against PAOK.
  - 10/05/2026, in a league match against Panathinaikos.
  - 17/05/2026, in a league match against Olympiacos.

== Transfer records ==
Players in bold are currently playing for AEK Athens. Players in italics are still active not playing for AEK Athens.

=== Transfer fee paid ===
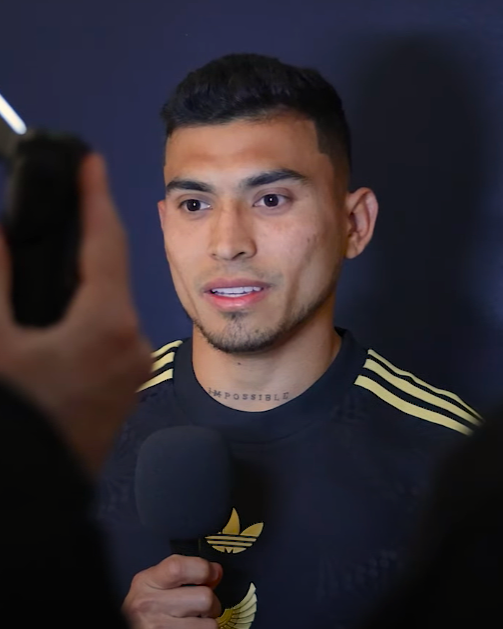
Orbelín Pineda is the club's record arrival.

R.	Name	Season	From	Fee	Source
1	(Mexico) Orbelín Pineda	2023–24	(Spain) Celta Vigo	€6,500,000	
2	(Croatia) **Lovro Majer**	2026–27	(Germany) VfL Wolfsburg	€6,000,000	
3	(Hungary) **Barnabás Varga**	2025–26	(Hungary) Ferencváros	€4,500,000	
4	(Croatia) **Robert Ljubičić**	2023–24	(Croatia) Dinamo Zagreb	€4,000,000 (Note: plus resale fee.)	
4	(Mauritania) **Aboubakary Koïta**	2024–25	(Belgium) Sint-Truiden	€4,000,000 (Note: Sint-Truidense keeps the 10% of the player's rights.)	
4	(Ukraine) **Oleksandr Zubkov**	2026–27	(Turkey) Trabzonspor	€4,000,000 (Note: plus €500,000 bonuses and Trabzonspor keeps the 10% of the player's rights.)	
4	(Finland) **Kaan Kairinen**	2026–27	(Czech Republic) Sparta Prague	€4,000,000	
8	(Greece) Vasilios Tsiartas	2000–01	(Spain) Sevilla	€3,500,000	
8	(Argentina) Ezequiel Ponce	2023–24	(Spain) Elche	€3,500,000	
8	(Portugal) **Filipe Relvas**	2025–26	(Portugal) Vitória Guimarães	€3,500,000	

=== Transfer fee received ===
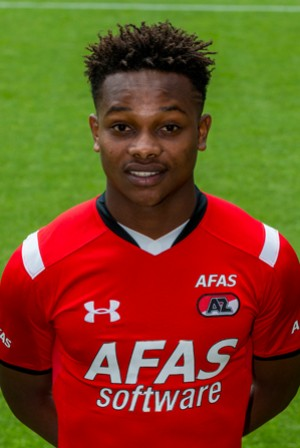
Levi García is the most high-paid transfer of the club.

R.	Name	Season	To	Fee	Source
1	(Trinidad and Tobago) Levi García	2024–25	(Russia) Spartak Moscow	€18,700,000 (Note: AEK paid €2,500,000 to buy another 20% of the player's rights (80% in total) and thus received the amount of €14,000,000 in total.)	
2	(Argentina) Ezequiel Ponce	2024–25	(United States) Houston Dynamo	€9,000,000	
3	(Mexico) Orbelín Pineda	2026–27	(Mexico) Monterrey	€8,000,000	
4	(Greece) Vasilis Barkas	2020–21	(Scotland) Celtic	€5,000,000 (Note: plus €1,000,000 bonuses.)	
5	(Greece) Sokratis Papastathopoulos	2008–09	(Italy) Genoa	€3,800,000 (Note: plus 15% (€675,000 from his transfer to Milan) of resale fee.)	
6	(Bosnia and Herzegovina) Ognjen Vranješ	2018–19	(Belgium) Anderlecht	€3,200,000 (Note: plus €300,000 with bonuses.)	
7	(Greece) Sotirios Kyrgiakos	2009–10	(England) Liverpool	€3,000,000 (Note: plus Krisztián Németh on one-year free loan.)	
7	(Albania) Mario Mitaj	2022–23	(Russia) Lokomotiv Moscow	€3,000,000	
9	(Argentina) Ignacio Scocco	2011–12	(United Arab Emirates) Al Ain	€2,800,000	
10	(Greece) Kostas Katsouranis	2006–07	(Portugal) Benfica	€2,300,000 (Note: plus 25% (€900,000 from transfer to Panathinaikos) of resale fee and the incomes (€294,390) from their scheduled friendly game.)	

== See also ==
- AEK Athens F.C.
- History of AEK Athens F.C.
- AEK Athens F.C. in European football
- List of AEK Athens F.C. managers
- List of AEK Athens F.C. seasons
