= 1976–77 AEK Athens F.C. season =

AEK Athens
1976–77 season
- Chairman: Loukas Barlos
- Manager: František Fadrhonc
- Stadium: AEK Stadium
- Alpha Ethniki: 4th
- Greek Cup: Round of 16
- UEFA Cup: Semi-finals
- Top goalscorer: League: Thomas Mavros (18); All: Thomas Mavros (21)
- Highest home attendance: 35,000 vs QPR (16 March 1977)
- Lowest home attendance: 5,440 vs Panachaiki (19 June 1977)
- Average home league attendance: 17,074
- Biggest win: AEK Athens 5–1 PAS Giannina; AEK Athens 4–0 Panetolikos
- Biggest defeat: Juventus 4–1 AEK Athens
Home colours

The 1976–77 season was the 53rd season in the existence of AEK Athens F.C. and the 18th consecutive season in the top flight of Greek football. They competed in the Alpha Ethniki, the Greek Cup and the UEFA Cup. The season began on 15 September 1976 and finished on 26 June 1977.

== Overview ==
The vision that Loukas Barlos had entrusted to František Fadrhonc was beginning to take shape. In the summer of 1976, Barlos, loyal to his transfer approach, continued to strengthen the squad with prominent signings. The experienced goalkeeper of Aris, Nikos Christidis, the diligent shooter and free-kick specialist of Iraklis, Takis Nikoloudis and the dynamic defender of Panionios, Babis Intzoglou were integrated in the team of Fadrhonc. At the same time, Thomas Mavros eventually became eligible to crown their offense, after the end of the legal dispute with Panionios that kept him out of football activity throughout the previous season. Fadrhonc, considering the playing intelligence and technical qualities of Mimis Papaioannou, decided to relocate him as a "classic number 10", in order to fit all the great attackers that the club had to offer.

The negative results that were occurred in matches that coincided near European games, costed AEK points that prevented them from winning the title. As a result, AEK finished 4th place with 51 points, but at a distance of only 3 points from the top, as the first 4 teams finished with 54, 52, 52 and 51 points, respectively. Thomas Mavros showed from the beginning a sample of his skills, by scoring with 18 goals in the league.

In the Cup, AEK eliminated away from home both Proodeftiki and Iraklis in the first and second round, respectively. In the round of 16, AEK, again away from home, faced PAOK and were eliminated by a 2–1 defeat.

=== The campaign in the UEFA Cup ===
The season was overshadowed by the European course of AEK to the semi-finals of the UEFA Cup, which was the biggest international distinction of the club and second greatest in Greek football at a club level at the time, after the campaign of Panathinaikos to the 1971 European Cup Final.

The draw for the first round of the UEFA Cup, brought AEK facing the Soviet club, Dynamo Moscow. The opponent was considered anything but easy, as the Dynamo players were the backbone of the Soviet national team. At Nea Filadelfeia, Dynamo started offensively, but AEK balanced the game and in the 34th minute won a foul outside the area. Nikoloudis introduced to the fans of AEK his power free-kicks and opened the score. AEK continued in pressuring their opponents and took the victory by 2–0. The yellow-blacks entered the Central Dynamo Stadium in icy Moscow and at the end of the first half were back at the score by 1–0, while at the beginning of the second half Dynamo managed to equalize the score of the first match. The match was led to extra time, where at the 119th minute in AEK's last offensive effort, Wagner attempted a shot from the right which was blocked by Dolmatov's hand who, fortunately for AEK, was not the goalkeeper. The referee gave the undisputed penalty and Konstantinou, showing unparalleled composure, sent the ball to the right, the goalkeeper at the opposite direction and AEK Athens to the next round.

AEK entered the draw of the next round, where they were found themselves against Derby County. The opponent's size was huge considering that the creation of Brian Clough were English champion in 1972 and 1975, FA Community Shield winner of 1975 and semi-finalists at the 1972–73 European Cup. In the first match at Athens, AEK had a great performance and won 2–0. At the second leg AEK were lucky to have Lakis Stergioudas in perhaps the greatest night of his career, keeping the 0–0 at the half time. At the second half Derby opened the score, bringing AEK in distress. However, AEK increased their tempo and at the 64th minute they managed to equalize by a free-kick by Nikoloudis. AEK did not stop there, as at the 77th minute took the lead and 8 minutes later they doubled their advantage. The final 2–3 found AEK qualifying to the next round and were the first club in European tournaments' history to achieve a victory in English ground.

AEK were drawn for the third round, against Red Star Belgrade. At AEK Stadium, AEK were superior taking the lead early on and after an imposing performance won with the poor 2–0. At the rematch in Belgrade, the apparent superiority of AEK in the first match was not confirmed at the beginning of the match, as the Yugoslavs were ahead from the 20th minute. AEK, managed to equalize 5 minutes later only to find themselves back in the score by 2 goals at the end of the half time. Red Star needed just one more goal to qualify, which never came, thus AEK were among the 8 best teams of the tournament.

The draw sent yet again, AEK against another English club, Queens Park Rangers. In Loftus Road, the match quickly turned into a real nightmare for AEK, as the English entered aggressively and scored 2 goals from the penalty spot, while by the end of half time, made the final 3–0. The English considered that they had a secure score for the rematch and AEK was looking for a miracle. In Greece at a hot atmosphere made by the fans, AEK entered the game doing what they knew how to do best, to attack. The efforts bear fruit after a great offensive team performance managed to equalize the score of the first leg, which sent the match to extra time. At the end of the extra time, Fadrhonc, to everyone's surprise, subbed his goalkeeper, putting the "cold-blooded" and more experienced Christidis in the match knowing that he was a cerebral player who psychologized the opponent, while in training he had about 70% success rate in penalty saves. AEK won 7–6 in the penalty shoot-out with a block from Christidis at the final penalty that justified Fandronk and AEK were qualified to the semi-finals.

The draw put the Italian giants, Juventus on the path of AEK to the final of the UEFA Cup. The team of Giovanni Trapattoni had great players in their roster, such as Dino Zoff at the goalpost, Gaetano Scirea in defence, Marco Tardelli in midfield and Roberto Bettega in offense. In Turin AEK, without having anything to lose, played with confidence and despite the fact that were losing 1–0 in the 18th minute, stood against their opponent at even, managing to equalize at the 31st minute. In the second half, AEK were inattentive and the unforgiving Italians punished them with 3 goals that made the final 4–1. At the rematch, AEK played their attractive football, but did not succeed in a yet another miracle, as they lost by 0–1, ending their long European journey.

== Management team ==
Position	Staff
Manager	(Czechoslovakia) František Fadrhonc
Assistant manager	(Greece) Andreas Stamatiadis
Goalkeeping coach	(Greece) Stelios Serafidis
Academy manager	(Greece) Kostas Nestoridis
Head of Medical	(Greece) Apostolidis

== Players ==
=== Squad information ===
NOTE: The players are the ones that have been announced by the AEK Athens' press release. No edits should be made unless a player arrival or exit is announced. Updated 26 June 1977, 23:59 UTC+3.

Player	Nat.	Position(s)	Date of birth (Age)	Signed	Previous club	Transfer fee	Contract until
Goalkeepers
Nikos Christidis	(Greece)	GK	2 August 1944 (aged 32)	1976	(Greece) Aris	₯1,500,000	1984
Giorgos Sidiropoulos	(Greece)	GK	25 June 1949 (aged 28)	1973	(Greece) Trikala	₯1,800,000	1981
Lakis Stergioudas	(Greece)	GK	11 December 1952 (aged 24)	1972	(Greece) Niki Polygyros	₯36,000	1981
Defenders
Giorgos Skrekis	(Greece)	RB / CB	2 February 1945 (aged 32)	1974	(Greece) Panionios	₯500,000	1982
Apostolos Toskas	(Greece)	CB	28 December 1947 (aged 29)	1969	(Greece) Trikala	₯1,500,000	1977
Lakis Nikolaou	(Greece)	CB / RB / ST / RW	17 July 1949 (aged 27)	1971	(Greece) Atromitos	₯600,000	1979
Babis Intzoglou	(Greece)	RB / LB / CB	1 April 1949 (aged 28)	1976	(Greece) Panionios	₯3,000,000	1984
Sakis Zarzopoulos	(Greece)	CB / DM / RB / LB	15 December 1949 (aged 27)	1973	(Greece) Panserraikos	₯2,500,000	1981
Stefanos Theodoridis	(Greece)	RB / LB / CB / RM / LM	19 June 1950 (aged 27)	1969	(Greece) AEK Athens U20	—	1977
Petros Ravousis	(Greece)	CB / RB	1 October 1954 (aged 22)	1972	(Greece) Aetos Skydra	Free	1981
Midfielders
Lazaros Papadopoulos	(Greece)	RM / RB / LM / LB / RW / LW	3 January 1950 (aged 27)	1973	(Greece) Veria	₯1,300,000	1981
Takis Nikoloudis	(Greece)	CM / AM / RM / LM	26 August 1951 (aged 25)	1976	(Greece) Iraklis	Free	1984
Dionysis Tsamis	(Greece)	CM / DM / AM	17 October 1951 (aged 25)	1972	(Greece) Panetolikos	₯2,350,000	1981
Christos Ardizoglou	(Greece) (Israel)	RM / LM / RW / LW / AM / RB / LB	25 March 1953 (aged 24)	1974	(Greece) Apollon Athens	₯12,000,000	1982
Giorgos Vlantis	(Greece)	CM / AM	30 January 1958 (aged 19)	1976	(Greece) AEK Athens U20	—	1984
Forwards
Mimis Papaioannou (Captain)	(Greece)	SS / ST / AM / RW	17 November 1942 (aged 34)	1962	(Greece) Veria	₯175,000	1980
Georgios Dedes	(Greece)	ST / SS / RW / LW / RM / LM	25 February 1943 (aged 34)	1974	(Greece) Panionios	₯1,000,000	1982
Walter Wagner	(West Germany)	ST / SS / RW / LW / RM	26 July 1949 (aged 27)	1974	Austria Wien	Free	1977
Tasos Konstantinou	(Cyprus)	RW / SS / ST / RM / AM	11 March 1951 (aged 26)	1972	(Cyprus) EPA Larnaca	₯600,000	1980
Alekos Papadopoulos	(Greece) (Soviet Union)	ST / SS	5 June 1951 (aged 26)	1976	(Soviet Union) Pakhtakor Tashkent	Free	1984
Thomas Mavros	(Greece)	ST / LW	31 May 1954 (aged 23)	1976	(Greece) Panionios	₯10,000,000	1983
Left during season
Timo Zahnleiter	(West Germany)	CM / DM / LB	16 December 1948 (aged 28)	1974	(West Germany) 1860 München	₯1,200,000	1978
From Reserve Squad
Andreas Xenos	(Greece)	RB	1954 (aged 22–23)	1969	(Greece) AEK Athens U20	—	
Fotis Outsikas	(Greece)	LM / LB / LW	26 May 1957 (aged 20)	1973	(Greece) Pamisos Messini	—	
Michalis Michalas	(Greece)	RW / RM	1955 (aged 21–22)	1974	(Greece) AEK Athens U20	—	

== Transfers ==
=== In ===
Pos.	Player	From	Fee	Date	Contract Until	Source
GK	(Greece) Nikos Christidis	(Greece) Aris	₯1,500,000	12 July 1976	30 June 1984	
DF	(Greece) Babis Intzoglou	(Greece) Panionios	₯3,000,000	21 July 1976	30 June 1984	
DF	(Greece) Victoras Theofilopoulos	(Greece) Kastoria	Loan return	1 July 1976	30 June 1982	
MF	(Greece) Takis Nikoloudis	(Greece) Iraklis	₯3,500,000	31 July 1976	30 June 1984	
MF	(Greece) Giorgos Vlantis	(Greece) AEK Athens U20	Promotion	13 December 1976	30 November 1984	
FW	(Greece) Thomas Mavros	(Greece) Panionios	₯10,000,000^{[a]}	2 July 1976	30 June 1983	
FW	(Greece) Alekos Papadopoulos	(Soviet Union) Pakhtakor Tashkent	Free transfer	5 November 1976	30 June 1984	

Notes

a. AEK paid Panionios the amount of ₯10,000,000 in an out-of-court settlement between the two clubs. Τhe amount of ₯1,500,000 were paid in cash and the remaining ₯8,500,000 in two-year bills. Since the deal of Mavros with AEK was originally signed in July 1975, the decision stated that his contract was effective from 1 September 1975, even though he wasn't officially a player of the club during that period.

=== Out ===
Pos.	Player	To	Fee	Date	Source
DF	(Greece) Spyros Stefanidis	(Greece) Atromitos	Contract termination	3 August 1976	
DF	(Greece) Victoras Theofilopoulos	(Greece) Apollon Athens	Contract termination	1 August 1976	
DF	(Greece) Nikos Karoulias	(Greece) Apollon Athens	Contract termination	23 July 1976	
MF	(Greece) Giorgos Lavaridis	(Greece) Panserraikos	End of contract	7 August 1976	
MF	(West Germany) Timo Zahnleiter	Free agent	Contract termination	3 February 1977	
MF	(Cyprus) Takis Timotheou	(Greece) Apollon Athens	Contract termination	24 July 1976	

=== Contract renewals ===
Pos.	Player	Date	Former Exp. Date	New Exp. Date	Source
MF	(West Germany) Timo Zahnleiter	3 September 1976	30 June 1976	30 June 1977	
FW	(Greece) Mimis Papaioannou	1 July 1976	30 June 1976	30 June 1980	
FW	(West Germany) Walter Wagner	12 August 1976	30 June 1976	30 June 1977	

=== Overall transfer activity ===
Expenditure: ▼ ₯18,000,000

Income: ▲ ₯0

Net Total: ▼ ₯18,000,000

== Pre-season and friendlies ==
9 August 1976 Friendly	AEK Athens	2–2	Slavia Prague	Nea Filadelfeia
21:00 EEST (UTC+3)	Papaioannou 44'; Wagner 69'	Report	Svoboda 16'; Theodoridis 71' (o.g.)	Stadium: AEK Stadium; Attendance: 21,776; Referee: Stelios Marinelis (Athens)

11 August 1976 Friendly	Heraklion XI	0–3	AEK Athens	Heraklion
17:30 EEST (UTC+3)		Report	Dedes 47'; Wagner 62'; Mavros 80'	Stadium: Municipal Nea Alikarnassos Stadium; Attendance: 5,000; Referee: Giannis Petrakis (Heraklion)

16 August 1976 Friendly	AEK Athens	0–1	Twente	Nea Filadelfeia
21:00 EEST (UTC+3)		Report	Gritter 35'	Stadium: AEK Stadium; Attendance: 18,082; Referee: Nikos Makris (Athens)

22 August 1976 Friendly	AEK Athens	7–2	Rodos	Nea Filadelfeia
21:00 EEST (UTC+3)	Intzoglou 48'; Nikoloudis 54'; Wagner 64', 83'; Mavros 67'; Konstantinou 71' (pen.); Dedes 79'	Report	Kottis 38', 51'	Stadium: AEK Stadium; Attendance: 5,579; Referee: Ι. Marinos (Athens)
Note: Replacement of the canceled friendly match against Panathinaikos.

25 August 1976 Friendly	AEK Athens	3–3	Romania	Nea Filadelfeia
21:00 EEST (UTC+3)	Mavros 6', 24', 65'	Report	Dumitru 36'; Bölöni 48'; Mulțescu 67'	Stadium: AEK Stadium; Attendance: 18,543; Referee: Giorgos Ballis (Athens)

29 August 1976 Friendly	Iraklis	0–2	AEK Athens	Thessaloniki
21:00 EEST (UTC+3)	Gesios (penalty missed) 89'	Report	Papaioannou 16'; Ravousis (yellow card) 35'; Orfanidis 49' (o.g.)	Stadium: Kaftanzoglio Stadium; Attendance: 12,426; Referee: Abatzis (Thessaloniki)
Note: Friendly match as part of the transfer of Takis Nikoloudis.

1 September 1976 Friendly	AEK Athens	1–1	Panionios	Nea Filadelfeia
21:00 EEST (UTC+3)	L. Papadopoulos 80'	Report	Lima 11'	Stadium: AEK Stadium; Attendance: 6,398; Referee: Panagiotis Pagonis (Athens)
Note: Friendly match as part of the transfer of Thomas Mavros.

4 September 1976 Friendly	AEK Athens	2–1	PAOK	Nea Filadelfeia
21:00 EEST (UTC+3)	Wagner (yellow card) 43'; Mavros 57'; Apostolidis 85' (o.g.)	Report	Koudas 6'; Terzanidis (yellow card) 19'	Stadium: AEK Stadium; Attendance: 16,301; Referee: Takis Moumtzis (Athens)

8 September 1976 Friendly	AEK Athens	1–2	Olympiacos	Nea Filadelfeia
21:00 EEST (UTC+3)	Konstantinou 15' (pen.); Nikoloudis (yellow card) 23'	Report	Galakos (yellow card) 24', (goal) 80'; Vasilopoulos 65'	Stadium: AEK Stadium; Attendance: 26,027; Referee: Giorgos Ballis (Athens)

11 September 1976 Friendly	Aris	1–0	AEK Athens	Thessaloniki
21:00 EEST (UTC+3)	Venos 32'	Report		Stadium: Kaftanzoglio Stadium; Attendance: 11,706; Referee: Dotsis

19 September 1976 Friendly	AEK Athens	2–0	PAS Giannina	Nea Filadelfeia
20:30 EEST (UTC+3)	Wagner 65'; Dedes 71'	Report		Stadium: AEK Stadium; Attendance: 4,859; Referee: Konstantinos Sfyrlas (Athens)

25 September 1976 Friendly	AEK Athens	4–0	Egaleo	Nea Filadelfeia
15:00 EEST (UTC+3)	Nikoloudis 17'; Wagner 53'; Mavros 70', 76'	Report		Stadium: AEK Stadium; Referee: Giaglis (Athens)

13 October 1976 Friendly	AEK Athens	4–4	MTK Budapest	Nea Filadelfeia
19:00 EEST (UTC+3)	Csorna 16' (o.g.); Konstantinou 27' (pen.); Wagner 34', 79'	Report	Siklosi 41'; Borsó 55'; Takacs 57', 76'	Stadium: Nikos Goumas Stadium; Attendance: 3,006; Referee: Nikos Lagogiannis (Piraeus)

10 November 1976 Friendly	AEK Athens	7–2	Egaleo	Nea Filadelfeia
15:00 EEST (UTC+3)	A. Papadopoulos 11', 34', 59', 62'; L. Papadopoulos 33'; Kalaitzidis 75', 84'	Report	Anastasiadis 42', 77'	Stadium: AEK Stadium; Attendance: 3,000; Referee: Andreas Stamatiadis

19 January 1977 Friendly	Kallithea	2–2	AEK Athens	Kallithea
15:00 EET (UTC+2)	Michelis 10'; Valakas 29'	Report	Dedes 47', 90'	Stadium: Grigoris Lamprakis Stadium; Referee: Mandalis

26 January 1977 Friendly	AEK Athens	1–0	Slavia Prague	Nea Filadelfeia
15:00 EET (UTC+2)	Nikoloudis 48'	Report	Segmüller (yellow card) 50'; Frydrych (yellow card) 55'	Stadium: AEK Stadium; Attendance: 5,000; Referee: Mandalis

2 February 1977 Friendly	AEK Athens	5–2	Atromitos Piraeus	Nea Filadelfeia
15:00 EET (UTC+2)	Dedes 11'; A. Papadopoulos 24'; Michalas 34'; Stafylas 72'; Kallinteroglou 82'	Report	Chatziskoulidis 52', 74'	Stadium: AEK Stadium; Attendance: 1,500; Referee: Mitsiakos

3 March 1977 Friendly	AEK London	4–4	AEK Athens	London
17:00 EET (UTC+2)	Done; Deroy 89'	Report	Kalaitzidis 14'; Konstantinou 17', 38' (pen.); Stafylas 62'	Stadium: Finchley Stadium; Attendance: 500

27 April 1977 Friendly	Chalkida	0–2	AEK Athens	Chalcis
17:00 EEST (UTC+3)		Report	Papaioannou 35', 70'	Stadium: Municipal Stadium of Chalkida; Attendance: 5,000; Referee: Vlachos

8 May 1977 Friendly	AEK Athens	1–2	Panionios	Nea Filadelfeia
17:30 EEST (UTC+3)	A. Papadopoulos 56' (pen.)	Report	Mavrikis 30'; T. Theodoridis 53'	Stadium: AEK Stadium; Attendance: 1,501; Referee: Tavoularis

26 May 1977 Friendly	AEL	1–2	AEK Athens	Larissa
21:00 EEST (UTC+3)	Mousouris (penalty missed) 78', Mandravelis 78'	Report	A. Papadopoulos 20'; Mavros 73'	Stadium: Alcazar Stadium; Attendance: 8,000; Referee: Kakardakis
Note: The first match at Alcazar Stadium under floodlights. The penalty that AEL won was taken twice. It was taken by Mousouris who hit the post, but the referee order its replay, where he also hit the post.

15 June 1977 Friendly	Veria	1–2	AEK Athens	Veria
18:00 EEST (UTC+3)	Sioutis 82'	Report	Nikoloudis 54'; Konstantinou 58'	Stadium: Veria Stadium; Attendance: 5,000; Referee: Kosmas Loukidis (Imathia)
Note: Lakis Stergioudas competed as a midfielder in the second half, replacing Takis Nikoloudis who was injured.

== Competitions ==
=== Overall record ===
Competition	First match	Last match	Starting round	Final position	Record							
Competition	First match	Last match	Starting round	Final position	Pld	W	D	L	GF	GA	GD	Win %
Alpha Ethniki	3 October 1976	26 June 1977	Matchday 1	4th	34	24	3	7	63	29	+34	70.59
Greek Cup	1 December 1976	9 February 1977	First round	Round of 16	3	2	0	1	6	4	+2	66.67
UEFA Cup	15 September 1976	20 April 1977	First round	Semi-finals	10	5	0	5	15	15	+0	50.00
Total					47	31	3	13	84	48	+36	65.96

Last updated: 26 June 1977
Source: Competitions

=== Alpha Ethniki ===
==== League table ====
Pos	Team	Pld	W	D	L	GF	GA	GD	Pts	Qualification or relegation
2	Olympiacos	34	23	6	5	70	27	+43	52	Qualification for UEFA Cup first round
3	PAOK	34	21	10	3	63	27	+36	52	Qualification for Cup Winners' Cup first round (Note: Since Panathinaikos, winners of 1976–77 Greek Cup, were qualified for the 1977–78 European Cup, runners-up PAOK earned a spot in the first round of the 1977–78 European Cup Winners' Cup.)
4	AEK Athens	34	24	3	7	63	29	+34	51	Qualification for UEFA Cup first round
5	Aris	34	17	8	9	58	34	+24	42	
6	OFI	34	14	5	15	57	51	+6	33	

Source: RSSSF
Rules for classification: 1st points; 2nd total goal ratio; 3rd decision match.

==== Results summary ====
Overall								Home						Away					
Pld	W	D	L	GF	GA	GD	Pts	W	D	L	GF	GA	GD	W	D	L	GF	GA	GD
34	24	3	7	63	29	+34	51	15	1	1	42	13	+29	9	2	6	21	16	+5

Source: Competitive matches

==== Results by Matchday ====
Round	1	2	3	4	5	6	7	8	9	10	11	12	13	14	15	16	17	18	19	20	21	22	23	24	25	26	27	28	29	30	31	32	33	34
Ground	H	A	H	A	H	A	H	H	A	H	A	H	A	H	A	A	H	A	H	A	H	A	H	A	A	H	A	H	A	H	A	H	H	A
Result	W	W	W	L	W	L	W	W	W	W	D	L	W	W	W	W	W	L	W	W	D	D	W	L	W	W	L	W	L	W	W	W	W	W
Position	1	1	1	4	4	5	4	4	4	3	4	4	4	4	4	4	4	4	4	4	4	4	3	4	4	4	4	4	4	4	4	4	4	4

Source: Competitive matches
A = Away; H = Home; W = Win; D = Draw; L = Loss; P = Postponed

==== Matches ====
3 October 1976 1	AEK Athens	2–0	Panionios	Nea Filadelfeia
16:30 EEST (UTC+3)	Ravousis (yellow card) 62'; Wagner (yellow card) 64'; Konstantinou 70' (pen.); Mavros 86'		Sebekos (yellow card) 62'	Stadium: AEK Stadium; Attendance: 20,593; Referee: Panagiotis Tsolakidis (Thessaloniki)

17 October 1976 2	Kastoria	0–3	AEK Athens	Kastoria
15:30 EEST (UTC+3)			Ardizoglou 63'; Mavros 71', 88'	Stadium: Municipal Stadium of Kastoria; Attendance: 3,257; Referee: Giorgos Petropoulos (Athens)

24 October 1976 3	AEK Athens	2–0	Aris	Nea Filadelfeia
	Nikoloudis 32'; Konstantinou 40'			Stadium: AEK Stadium; Attendance: 21,317; Referee: Kostas Xanthos (Dodecanese)

31 October 1976 4	Pierikos	3–1	AEK Athens	Katerini
14:30 EET (UTC+2)	Panteliadis 10'; Giannoulis 56'; L. Papaioannou 64'		Mavros 3'	Stadium: Katerini Stadium; Attendance: 8,356; Referee: Timoleon Latsios (Larissa)

7 November 1976 5	AEK Athens	4–1	Panserraikos	Nea Filadelfeia
14:30 EET (UTC+2)	Mavros 61', 84'; Papaioannou 67', 75'		Lygasis (yellow card); Tsirikas (yellow card); Sofias 8'	Stadium: AEK Stadium; Attendance: 18,871; Referee: Giorgos Petropoulos (Athens)

14 November 1976 6	Olympiacos	2–0	AEK Athens	Piraeus
14:30 EET (UTC+2)	Karavitis 68' (pen.); Galakos 90+4'		Intzoglou (yellow card) 9' (yellow-red card) 84'; Nikolaou (yellow card) 20'; Mavros (red card) 80'	Stadium: Karaiskakis Stadium; Attendance: 39,138; Referee: Giorgos Armodoros (Piraeus)

21 November 1976 7	AEK Athens	1–0	Iraklis	Nea Filadelfeia
14:30 EET (UTC+2)	Konstantinou 71'			Stadium: AEK Stadium; Attendance: 18,624; Referee: Vasilis Patarakis (Piraeus)

28 November 1976 8	AEK Athens	4–0	Panetolikos	Nea Filadelfeia
14:30 EET (UTC+2)	Papaioannou (yellow card) 55'; Nikoloudis 61', 74'; L. Papadopoulos 79'; Ardizoglou 89'			Stadium: AEK Stadium; Attendance: 11,113; Referee: Egoustos Sapatakidis (Thessaloniki)

15 December 1976 9	PAS Giannina	0–1	AEK Athens	Ioannina
14:30 EET (UTC+2)	Espinosa (yellow card) (red card) 81'; Grammeniatis (yellow card) 43'; Glasmanis (yellow card) 43'		Theodoridis (yellow card) 20'; Ardizoglou (yellow card) 38'; Nikoloudis 64'	Stadium: Zosimades Stadium; Attendance: 7,287; Referee: Theodoros Tsanaklidis (Kavala)
Note: The match originally took place at 5 December, but it was suspended due to rainfall.

12 December 1976 10	AEK Athens	4–1	Ethnikos Piraeus	Nea Filadelfeia
14:30 EET (UTC+2)	Tsamis 19'; Wagner 25', 43', 89'		Kremmydas (yellow card) 28'; T. Intzoglou 59'	Stadium: AEK Stadium; Attendance: 9,134; Referee: Nikos Fakis (Athens)

19 December 1976 11	PAOK	0–0	AEK Athens	Thessaloniki
14:30 EET (UTC+2)			Nikoloudis (yellow card) 72'	Stadium: Toumba Stadium; Attendance: 45,252; Referee: Kostas Levogiannis (Athens)

26 December 1976 12	AEK Athens	0–2	Panathinaikos	Nea Filadelfeia
14:30 EET (UTC+2)			Álvarez (yellow card); Kapsis (yellow card); Theodoridis 7' (o.g.); Antoniadis 23'	Stadium: AEK Stadium; Attendance: 29,106; Referee: Stefanos Rammos (Thessaloniki)

2 January 1977 13	Apollon Athens	0–2	AEK Athens	Rizoupoli
14:30 EET (UTC+2)	Karypidis (yellow card)		Papaioannou 43'; Wagner 63'	Stadium: Rizoupoli Stadium; Attendance: 11,320; Referee: Giorgos Parasidis (Thessaloniki)
Note: Mimis Papaioannou became all time top scorer in the Greek Championship, surpassing Giorgos Sideris.

9 January 1977 14	AEK Athens	4–1	OFI	Nea Filadelfeia
14:30 EET (UTC+2)	Ardizoglou 13'; Mavros 46', 87'; Wagner 65'		D. Papadopoulos 70'	Stadium: AEK Stadium; Attendance: 16,696; Referee: Timoleon Latsios (Larissa)

16 January 1977 15	Kavala	0–1	AEK Athens	Kavala
14:30 EET (UTC+2)			Konstantinou 45' (pen.)	Stadium: Kavala National Stadium; Attendance: 12,536; Referee: Pan Marinos (Piraeus)

23 January 1977 16	Panachaiki	0–2	AEK Athens	Patras
14:30 EET (UTC+2)			Mavros 87'; Wagner 90'	Stadium: Panachaiki Stadium; Attendance: 16,081; Referee: Giannis Petrakis (Heraklion)

30 January 1977 17	AEK Athens	1–0	Atromitos	Nea Filadelfeia
15:00 EET (UTC+2)	Konstantinou 49'		Konstantinidis (yellow card)	Stadium: AEK Stadium; Attendance: 17,789; Referee: Stefanos Rammos (Thessaloniki)
Note: Before the beginning of the match, Loukas Barlos awarded Mimis Papaioannou the "Golden Double-Headed Eagle".

6 February 1977 18	Panionios	3–0	AEK Athens	Nea Smyrni
15:00 EET (UTC+2)	Anastopoulos 10', 75'; Moraitelis 61'		Nikoloudis (penalty missed) 88'	Stadium: Nea Smyrni Stadium; Attendance: 18,470; Referee: Dimitris Pantzalis (Piraeus)

13 February 1977 19	AEK Athens	2–1	Kastoria	Nea Filadelfeia
15:00 EET (UTC+2)	Mavros 61'; Wagner 82' (pen.)		Kopanos 48'	Stadium: AEK Stadium; Attendance: 11,574; Referee: Vasilis Patarakis (Piraeus)

20 February 1977 20	Aris	0–1	AEK Athens	Thessaloniki
15:00 EET (UTC+2)			Wagner 64'	Stadium: Aris Stadium; Attendance: 20,462; Referee: Dimitris Pantzalis (Piraeus)

27 February 1977 21	AEK Athens	2–2	Pierikos	Nea Filadelfeia
15:00 EET (UTC+2)	Ardizoglou (red card) 76'; Konstantinou 80' (pen.), (red card) 84'; Tsamis 88' (pen.)		Adamopoulos 43'; Koktsidis (red card) 84'; L. Papaioannou 90+3'	Stadium: AEK Stadium; Attendance: 18,349; Referee: Antonis Vassaras (Thessaloniki)
Note: At the 76th minute, after a penalty not being awarded to A.E.K., their players gathered around the referee to protest. After intense protests, Ardizoglou escaped from the hands of his teammates and attacked the referee. This resulted in his expulsion with a straight red and his punishment with 10 matches.

6 March 1977 22	Panserraikos	1–1	AEK Athens	Serres
15:00 EET (UTC+2)	Sofias 52'; Tsirikas (yellow card) 60'		Mavros 55'	Stadium: Serres Municipal Stadium; Attendance: 4,980; Referee: Thomaidis (Piraeus)

13 March 1977 23	AEK Athens	1–0	Olympiacos	Nea Filadelfeia
15:30 EET (UTC+2)	Zarzopoulos (yellow card); Nikolaou (yellow card); Nikoloudis (yellow card); Wagner 16'		Davourlis (yellow card); Karavitis (yellow card) 18'	Stadium: AEK Stadium; Attendance: 29,003; Referee: Kostas Krikonis (Epirus)

20 March 1977 24	Iraklis	1–0	AEK Athens	Thessaloniki
15:30 EET (UTC+2)	Christoforidis 78'			Stadium: Kaftanzoglio Stadium; Attendance: 30,408; Referee: Michalis Ornerakis (Chania)

27 March 1977 25	Panetolikos	1–3	AEK Athens	Agrinio
15:30 EEST (UTC+3)	K. Papaioannou 37' (pen.)		Nikoloudis 2'; Konstantinou 6', 75'	Stadium: Panetolikos Stadium; Attendance: 9,811; Referee: Thomaidis (Piraeus)

3 April 1977 26	AEK Athens	5–1	PAS Giannina	Nea Filadelfeia
16:30 EEST (UTC+3)	Wagner 22', 75'; L. Papadopoulos 25'; Konstantinou 34'; Ravousis 41'		Glasmanis 44'	Stadium: AEK Stadium; Attendance: 18,746; Referee: Chiotakis (Thessaloniki)

11 April 1977 27	Ethnikos Piraeus	1–0	AEK Athens	Piraeus
16:30 EEST (UTC+3)	T. Intzoglou 36'		Konstantinou (penalty missed) 80'; Nikolaou (yellow card) 80' (yellow-red card) 82'	Stadium: Karaiskakis Stadium; Attendance: 20,446; Referee: Theodoros Tsanaklidis (Kavala)

1 May 1977 28	AEK Athens	1–0	PAOK	Nea Filadelfeia
16:30 EEST (UTC+3)	Papadopoulos (yellow card); Nikoloudis 12'		Damanakis (yellow card) 15' (yellow-red card) 43'; Fountoukidis (yellow card) 17'	Stadium: AEK Stadium; Attendance: 22,161; Referee: Tsoukaladelis (Lamia)

15 May 1977 29	Panathinaikos	2–0	AEK Athens	Ampelokipoi
17:00 EEST (UTC+3)	Antoniadis 22', 80'			Stadium: Leoforos Alexandras Stadium; Attendance: 24,200; Referee: Vasilis Patarakis (Piraeus)

22 May 1977 30	AEK Athens	2–1	Apollon Athens	Nea Filadelfeia
17:00 EEST (UTC+3)	Nikoloudis 61', 66'		Pathiakakis 90'	Stadium: AEK Stadium; Attendance: 5,926; Referee: Chiotakis (Thessaloniki)

5 June 1977 31	OFI	1–4	AEK Athens	Heraklion
17:00 EEST (UTC+3)	P. Papadopoulos 35'		Mavros 21', 28'; Vlantis 80'; L. Papadopoulos 84'	Stadium: Theodoros Vardinogiannis Stadium; Attendance: 8,027; Referee: Nikos Zlatanos (Thessaloniki)

12 June 1977 32	AEK Athens	3–1	Kavala	Nea Filadelfeia
17:30 EEST (UTC+3)	Mavros 34' (pen.), 79' (pen.); Nikoloudis 74'		Macheridis 14'; Effraimidis (penalty missed) 88'	Stadium: AEK Stadium; Attendance: 10,325; Referee: Giannis Petrakis (Heraklion)

19 June 1977 33	AEK Athens	4–2	Panachaiki	Nea Filadelfeia
17:30 EEST (UTC+3)	Mavros (penalty missed) 15', 49'; Wagner 27'; Nikoloudis 53', 57'		Stravopodis 73', 88' (pen.)	Stadium: AEK Stadium; Attendance: 5,440; Referee: Thomaidis (Piraeus)

26 June 1977 34	Atromitos	1–2	AEK Athens	Peristeri
18:15 EEST (UTC+3)	Pantelidis 51'		Mavros 15', 61' (pen.)	Stadium: Peristeri Stadium; Attendance: 2,604; Referee: Dimitris Pantzalis (Piraeus)

=== Greek Cup ===
==== Matches ====
1 December 1976 First round	Proodeftiki	1–3	AEK Athens	Nikaia
14:00 EET (UTC+2)	Xanthopoulos 18', (yellow card) 36'		Wagner 25'; Ardizoglou 66'; Dedes 80'	Stadium: Nikaia Municipal Stadium; Referee: Margaritis Doumousiadiss (Magnesia)

5 January 1977 Second round	Iraklis	1–2 (a.e.t.)	AEK Athens	Thessaloniki
14:00 EET (UTC+2)	Xanthopoulos (yellow card) 10'; Kousoulakis (yellow card) 24'; Antonijević 40'		Papaioannou 70'; Konstantinou 102' (pen.)	Stadium: Kaftanzoglio Stadium; Attendance: 21,759; Referee: Takis Moumtzis (Athens)
Note: In the extra time, when the referee awarded the penalty in favor of AEK, there were intense reactions from the players and the fans of Iraklis. This resulted in the captain of Iraklis, Fanaras pulling and tearting the collar of the referee. Immediately after AEK scored, the fans of Iraklis entered the pitch and even after the interruption that occurred, a fan continued to pursue the referee during the match! Afterwards and while the match was in progress, the fans of Iraklis were entering the pitch, while at the same time objects were being thrown. This caused the assistant referee, Kattis leaving midway through the second half of extra time. The situation escalated when a barrel fell from the stands, causing damage to the bench of AEK, which then caught fire from the throwing of burning newspapers, forcing those who were sitting there to take refuge in the hatch. In the midst of all this situation, the referee ended the match at the 117th minute and wild incidents followed from the fans of Iraklis with the squad of AEK and the referees' team running to the locker rooms. The result of the incidents was the lynching and the beating of the referee Moumtzis and the assistant referee Pagonis, while 4 arrests were made by the gendarmerie.

9 February 1977 Round of 16	PAOK	2–1	AEK Athens	Thessaloniki
14:30 EET (UTC+2)	Guerino 21'; Apostolidis 50'		Papaioannou 44'; Intzoglou (penalty missed) 57'	Stadium: Toumba Stadium; Attendance: 44,045; Referee: Kostas Levogiannis (Athens)

=== UEFA Cup ===
==== First round ====
15 September 1976 First leg	AEK Athens (Greece)	2–0	(Soviet Union) Dynamo Moscow	Athens, Greece
21:00 EEST (UTC+3)	Nikoloudis 32'; Ravousis (yellow card) 42'; Papaioannou 51'	Report		Stadium: AEK Stadium; Attendance: 26,151; Referee: Marijan Raus (Yugoslavia)

29 September 1976 Second leg	Dynamo Moscow (Soviet Union)	2–1 (a.e.t.) (2–3 agg.)	(Greece) AEK Athens	Moscow, Soviet Union
19:30 EEST (UTC+3)	Bubnov 43'; Yakubik 52' (pen.); Nikulin (yellow card) 55'; Makhovikov (yellow card) 81'	Report	Intzoglou (yellow card) 44'; Konstantinou 120' (pen.)	Stadium: Central Dynamo Stadium; Attendance: 30,000; Referee: Hugh Alexander (Scotland)

==== Second round ====
20 October 1976 First leg	AEK Athens (Greece)	2–0	(England) Derby County	Athens, Greece
19:00 EEST (UTC+3)	Wagner 65'; Thomas 69' (o.g.)	Report	Todd (yellow card) 49'	Stadium: AEK Stadium; Attendance: 32,000; Referee: Francis Rion (Belgium)

3 November 1976 Second leg	Derby County (England)	2–3 (2–5 agg.)	(Greece) AEK Athens	Derby, England
18:30 EET (UTC+2)	George 53'; Rioch 88'	Report	Nikoloudis (yellow card) 44', (goal) 64'; Wagner (yellow card) 69', (goal) 85'; Konstantinou 79'	Stadium: Baseball Ground; Attendance: 28,000; Referee: Heinz Einbeck (East Germany)

==== Third round ====
24 November 1976 First leg	AEK Athens (Greece)	2–0	(Socialist Federal Republic of Yugoslavia) Red Star Belgrade	Athens, Greece
18:30 EET (UTC+3)	Papaioannou 19'; Mavros 28'	Report		Stadium: AEK Stadium; Attendance: 25,000; Referee: Viktor Zharkov (Soviet Union)

8 December 1976 Second leg	Red Star Belgrade (Socialist Federal Republic of Yugoslavia)	3–1 (3–3(a) agg.)	(Greece) AEK Athens	Belgrade, Yugoslavia
	Savić (yellow card) 10', (goal) 33'; Baralić 21', (yellow card) 25'; Filipović 30'	Report	Wagner 25'; Intzoglou (yellow card) 81'	Stadium: Red Star Stadium; Attendance: 70,000; Referee: Alberto Michelotti (Italy)

==== Quarter-finals ====
3 March 1977 First leg	QPR (England)	3–0	(Greece) AEK Athens	London, England
	Francis 7' (pen.), 11' (pen.); Bowles 43'; Kelly (yellow card) 68'	Report		Stadium: Loftus Road; Attendance: 23,039; Referee: Ole Amundsen (Denmark)

16 March 1977 Second leg	AEK Athens (Greece)	3–0 (3–3 agg.) (7–6 p)	(England) QPR	Athens, Greece
19:30 EET (UTC+2)	Mavros 8', 65'; Papaioannou 82'; Intzoglou (yellow card) 93'	Report	Webb (yellow card) 8'	Stadium: AEK Stadium; Attendance: 35,000; Referee: Ferdinand Biwersi (West Germany)
	Penalties
	Konstantinou (penalty scored); Theodoridis (penalty scored); Ravousis (penalty scored); Nikoloudis (penalty missed); Wagner (penalty scored); Intzoglou (penalty scored); Zarzopoulos (penalty scored); Papaioannou (penalty scored)		(penalty scored) McLintock; (penalty scored) Masson; (penalty scored) Hollins; (penalty missed) Eastoe; (penalty scored) Bowles; (penalty scored) Givens; (penalty scored) Shanks; (penalty missed) Webb

==== Semi-finals ====
6 April 1977 First leg	Juventus (Italy)	4–1	(Greece) AEK Athens	Turin, Italy
22:30 EEST (UTC+3)	Cuccureddu 18'; Bettega 59', 83'; Causio 67'	Report	L. Papadopoulos 31'; Nikoloudis (yellow card) 72'	Stadium: Stadio Comunale; Attendance: 60,922; Referee: Viktor Zharkov (Soviet Union)

20 April 1977 Second leg	AEK Athens (Greece)	0–1 (1–5 agg.)	(Italy) Juventus	Athens, Greece
21:00 EEST (UTC+3)	Theodoridis (yellow card) 18'	Report	Bettega 84'	Stadium: AEK Stadium; Attendance: 32,000; Referee: Károly Palotai (Hungary)

== Statistics ==
=== Squad statistics ===
As of 26 June 1977

No.	Pos	Player	Alpha Ethniki		Greek Cup		UEFA Cup		Total	
No.	Pos	Player	Apps	Goals	Apps	Goals	Apps	Goals	Apps	Goals
Goalkeepers
—	GK	(Kingdom of Greece) Nikos Christidis	6	0	0	0	2	0	8	0
—	GK	(Kingdom of Greece) Giorgos Sidiropoulos	0	0	0	0	0	0	0	0
—	GK	(Kingdom of Greece) Lakis Stergioudas	28	0	3	0	9	0	40	0
Defenders
—	DF	(Kingdom of Greece) Giorgos Skrekis	5	0	2	0	2	0	9	0
—	DF	(Kingdom of Greece) Apostolos Toskas	9	0	0	0	1	0	10	0
—	DF	(Kingdom of Greece) Lakis Nikolaou	27	0	3	0	10	0	40	0
—	DF	(Kingdom of Greece) Babis Intzoglou	31	0	3	0	7	0	41	0
—	DF	(Kingdom of Greece) Sakis Zarzopoulos	7	0	0	0	2	0	9	0
—	DF	(Kingdom of Greece) Stefanos Theodoridis	23	0	3	0	10	0	36	0
—	DF	(Kingdom of Greece) Petros Ravousis	34	1	3	0	10	0	47	1
Midfielders
—	MF	(Kingdom of Greece) Lazaros Papadopoulos	24	3	3	0	6	1	33	4
—	MF	(Kingdom of Greece) Takis Nikoloudis	32	11	3	0	9	2	44	13
—	MF	(Kingdom of Greece) Dionysis Tsamis	32	2	1	0	10	0	43	2
—	MF	(Kingdom of Greece) Christos Ardizoglou	24	3	3	1	0	0	27	4
—	MF	(Kingdom of Greece) Giorgos Vlantis	7	1	0	0	0	0	7	1
Forwards
—	FW	(Kingdom of Greece) Mimis Papaioannou	30	3	2	2	10	3	42	8
—	FW	(Kingdom of Greece) Georgios Dedes	4	0	2	1	2	0	8	1
—	FW	(West Germany) Walter Wagner	31	12	2	1	10	3	43	16
—	FW	(Cyprus) Tasos Konstantinou	26	9	3	1	10	2	39	12
—	FW	(Kingdom of Greece) Alekos Papadopoulos	6	0	0	0	0	0	6	0
—	FW	(Kingdom of Greece) Thomas Mavros	30	18	2	0	10	3	42	21
Left during season
—	MF	(West Germany) Timo Zahnleiter	0	0	0	0	2	0	2	0
From Reserve Squad
—	DF	(Kingdom of Greece) Andreas Xenos	1	0	0	0	0	0	1	0
—	MF	(Kingdom of Greece) Fotis Outsikas	5	0	0	0	0	0	5	0
—	FW	(Kingdom of Greece) Michalis Michalas	1	0	0	0	0	0	1	0

=== Goalscorers ===
As of 26 June 1977
The list is sorted by competition order when total goals are equal, then by position and then alphabetically by surname.

Rank	Pos.	Player	Alpha Ethniki	Greek Cup	UEFA Cup	Total
1	FW	(Greece) Thomas Mavros	18	0	3	21
2	FW	(West Germany) Walter Wagner	12	1	3	16
3	MF	(Greece) Takis Nikoloudis	11	0	2	13
4	FW	(Cyprus) Tasos Konstantinou	9	1	2	12
5	FW	(Greece) Mimis Papaioannou	3	2	3	8
6	MF	(Greece) Christos Ardizoglou	3	1	0	4
6	MF	(Greece) Lazaros Papadopoulos	3	0	1	4
8	MF	(Greece) Dionysis Tsamis	2	0	0	2
9	DF	(Greece) Petros Ravousis	1	0	0	1
9	MF	(Greece) Giorgos Vlantis	1	0	0	1
9	FW	(Greece) Georgios Dedes	0	1	0	1
Own goals			1	0	0	1
Totals			64	6	14	84

=== Hat-tricks ===
Numbers in superscript represent the goals that the player scored.

Player	Against	Result	Date	Competition	Source
(West Germany) Walter Wagner	(Greece) Ethnikos Piraeus	4–1 (H)	12 December 1976	Alpha Ethniki	

=== Clean sheets ===
As of 26 June 1977
The list is sorted by competition order when total clean sheets are equal and then alphabetically by surname. Clean sheets in games where both goalkeepers participated are awarded to the goalkeeper who started the game. Goalkeepers with no appearances are not included.

Rank	Player	Alpha Ethniki	Greek Cup	UEFA Cup	Total
1	(Greece) Lakis Stergioudas	14	0	4	18
2	(Greece) Nikos Christidis	0	0	0	0
Totals		14	0	4	18

=== Disciplinary record ===
As of 26 June 1977

N	P	Nat.	Name	Alpha Ethniki			Greek Cup			UEFA Cup			Total			Notes
N	P	Nat.	Name	Yellow card	Second yellow card	Red card	Yellow card	Second yellow card	Red card	Yellow card	Second yellow card	Red card	Yellow card	Second yellow card	Red card	Notes
Goalkeepers
—	GK	(Kingdom of Greece)	Nikos Christidis													
—	GK	(Kingdom of Greece)	Giorgos Sidiropoulos													
—	GK	(Kingdom of Greece)	Lakis Stergioudas													
Defenders
—	DF	(Kingdom of Greece)	Giorgos Skrekis													
—	DF	(Kingdom of Greece)	Apostolos Toskas													
—	DF	(Kingdom of Greece)	Lakis Nikolaou	4	1								4	1		
—	DF	(Kingdom of Greece)	Babis Intzoglou	2	1					4			6	1		
—	DF	(Kingdom of Greece)	Sakis Zarzopoulos	1									1			
—	DF	(Kingdom of Greece)	Stefanos Theodoridis	1						1			2			
—	DF	(Kingdom of Greece)	Petros Ravousis	1						1			2			
Midfielders
—	MF	(Kingdom of Greece)	Lazaros Papadopoulos	1									1			
—	MF	(Kingdom of Greece)	Takis Nikoloudis	2						2			4			
—	MF	(Kingdom of Greece)	Dionysis Tsamis													
—	MF	(Kingdom of Greece)	Christos Ardizoglou	1		1							1		1	
—	MF	(Kingdom of Greece)	Giorgos Vlantis													
Forwards
—	FW	(Kingdom of Greece)	Mimis Papaioannou	1									1			
—	FW	(Kingdom of Greece)	Georgios Dedes													
—	FW	(West Germany)	Walter Wagner	1						1			2			
—	FW	(Cyprus)	Tasos Konstantinou			1									1	
—	FW	(Kingdom of Greece)	Alekos Papadopoulos													
—	FW	(Kingdom of Greece)	Thomas Mavros			1									1	
Left during season
—	MF	(West Germany)	Timo Zahnleiter													
From Reserve Squad
—	DF	(Kingdom of Greece)	Andreas Xenos													
—	MF	(Kingdom of Greece)	Fotis Outsikas													
—	FW	(Kingdom of Greece)	Michalis Michalas													

=== Starting 11 ===
This section presents the most frequently used formation along with the players with the most starts across all competitions.

N.	Formation	Matchday(s)
47	4–4–2 (D)	1–34

Nat.	Player	Pos.
(Greece)	Lakis Stergioudas	GK
(Greece)	Petros Ravousis	RCB
(Greece)	Lakis Nikolaou	LCB
(Greece)	Stefanos Theodoridis	RB
(Greece)	Babis Intzoglou	LB
(Greece)	Dionysis Tsamis	DM
(Cyprus)	Tasos Konstantinou	RCM
(Greece)	Takis Nikoloudis	LCM
(Greece)	Mimis Papaioannou (C)	AM
(West Germany)	Walter Wagner	CF
(Greece)	Thomas Mavros	CF

Last updated: 1977-06-26
