= Alekos Papadopoulos (footballer) =

Greek footballer and coach (1951–2007)

Personal information
- Full name: Alexandros Papadopoulos
- Date of birth: 5 June 1951
- Place of birth: Tashkent, Uzbek SSR, Soviet Union
- Date of death: 6 February 2007 (aged 55)
- Place of death: Veria, Greece
- Position: Forward

Senior career*
Years	Team	Apps	(Gls)
–1976	Pakhtakor		
1976–1977	AEK Athens	6	(0)
1977–1978	OFI	24	(2)
1978–1983	Naoussa		
1983–1984	Veria		

Managerial career
- 1988–1993: Naoussa
- 1994: Anagennisi Giannitsa
- 1994–1995: Niki Volos
- Olympiacos Volos
- 1997–1998: Kozani
- Almopos Aridea
- Argos Orestiko
- Odysseas Kordelio
- 2001–2002: Naoussa
- * Club domestic league appearances and goals

Alekos Papadopoulos (Greek: Αλέκος Παπαδόπουλος; 5 June 1951 – 6 February 2007) was a Greek footballer who played as a forward and a later manager.

== Club career ==
Papadopoulos played for Pakhtakor Tashkent Pakhtakor where he played alongside Vasilis Hatzipanagis. That caused the interest of the owner of AEK Athens, Loukas Barlos, who signed him in November 1976. Despite his initial impressive performances in the training sessions and friendlies he didn't manage to establish himself at the team, since they had many stars to compete with. In that season AEK reached the semi-finals of the UEFA Cup, but he did not make any appearance. After the end of the season, he was released from AEK and on 29 July 1977 he moved to OFI. The following season he went to Naoussa, where he played until 1983. He then signed for Veria, where he finished his career in 1984.

== Managerial career ==
Papadopoulos began his coaching career as an assistant coach at Naoussa alongside managers such as Stefanos Gaitanos and Giannis Mantzourakis. In 1988, he took over as head coach at Naoussa. He initiated a renewal of the team by promoting young footballers who later went on to have great careers, such as Vasilios Tsiartas, Dimitris Markos, Vasilios Lakis, Nikos Kyzeridis, Kostas Pavlopoulos, Ilias Sapanis, Miltiadis Sapanis and Grigoris Troupkos. In 1992 he managed to get the promotion to Alpha Ethniki.

He later coached Anagennisi Giannitsa, Niki Volos, Olympiacos Volos, Kozani, Almopos Aridea, Argos Orestiko, Odysseas Kordelio. In 2001 he returned to Naoussa, which they played in the amateur championship and got them the promotion to Delta Ethniki. In the following years he was involved in the training of young footballers at the football academy of A.O. Leontes.

== Personal life ==
Papadopoulos was married to Lyudmila and had three children, Anastasios, Vladimiros and Marios. On 6 February 2007, he died of a heart attack while on his way to training at A.O. Leontes. He was 56 years old.
